= Donghu station (Guangzhou Metro) =

Guangzhou Metro interchange station

Donghu 东湖
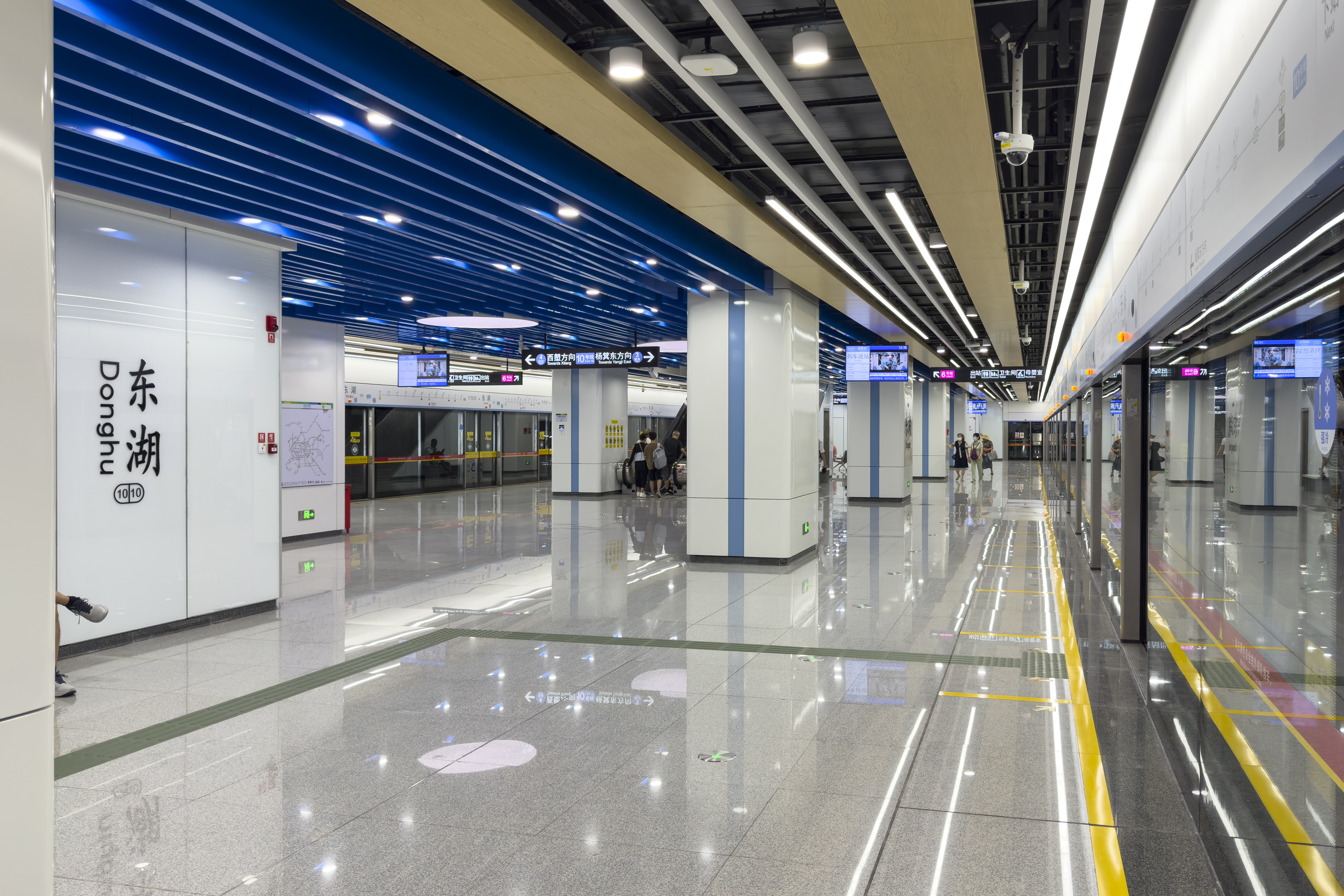
- Platform 3 of Line 10 (towards Yangji East)

Chinese name
- Simplified Chinese: 东湖站
- Traditional Chinese: 東湖站
- Literal meaning: East Lake station
Transcriptions
Standard Mandarin
- Hanyu Pinyin: Dōnghú Zhàn
Yue: Cantonese
- Yale Romanization: Dūngwù Jaahm
- Jyutping: Dung^{1}wu^{4} Zaam^{6}
- Hong Kong Romanization: Tung Wu station

General information
- Location: East of Donghu Road, within Dongshan Lake Park; Boundary of Baiyun Subdistrict and Dongshan Subdistrict, Yuexiu District, Guangzhou, Guangdong; China
- Coordinates: 23°06′54″N 113°17′19″E
- Operator: Guangzhou Metro Co. Ltd.
- Lines: Line 6; Line 10; Line 12 (2026)
- Platforms: 2 (1 island platform)

Construction
- Structure type: Underground
- Accessible: Yes

Other information
- Station code: 613 1010

History
- Opened: Line 6: 28 December 2013 (12 years ago); Line 10: 29 June 2025 (13 months ago)
- Opening: Line 12: December 2026 (4 months' time)

Services
Preceding station	Guangzhou Metro	Following station
Tuanyida Square towards Xunfenggang	Line 6	Dongshankou towards Xiangxue
Binjiang East Road towards Xilang	Line 10	Wuyangcun towards Yangji East
Future services
Martyrs' Park towards Xunfenggang	Line 12	Ersha Island towards Higher Education Mega Center South
Location

Donghu Station (simplified Chinese: 东湖站; traditional Chinese: 東湖站; Jyutping: dung^{1} wu^{4} zaam^{6}; Cantonese Yale: Dūngwù Jaahm; lit. 'East Lake station') is an interchange station between Line 6 and Line 10 of the Guangzhou Metro. It is located underground within Dongshan Lake Park in Guangzhou's Yuexiu District. The Line 6 station started operations on 28 December 2013. The Line 10 station started operations on 29 June 2025, thus becoming an interchange station.

== Station layout ==
Donghu Station is divided into two sections: Line 6 and Line 10/12. The station is surrounded by Donghu Road, Haiyin Bridge Approach Bridge, Dongshan Lake Park and other nearby buildings.

=== Line 6 ===
The Line 6 station is a four-storey underground station. The ground level is the exit, the first floor is the mezzanine level for Exit B, the second floor is the concourse, the third floor is the equipment level, and the fourth floor is the platform for Line 6.

G	-	Exits A, B1, B2, B3, C
L1	Exit B mezzanine level	Non-paid area transfer towards Line 10 upper concourse
L1		Reserved zone
L2; Concourse	6 Lobby	Ticket Machines, Customer Service, Shops, Police Station, Security Facilities; Paid area transfer towards Line 10 upper concourse
L3	Mezzanine	Stairs connecting concourse and platforms, transfer passage towards Line 10 lower concourse Station Equipment
L4; Platforms	Platform 2	6 towards Xunfenggang (Tuanyida Square)
L4; Platforms	Island platform, doors will open on the left
L4; Platforms	Platform 1	6 towards Xiangxue (Dongshankou)

=== Line 10/12 ===
The Line 10 and Line 12 station is a five-storey underground station. The ground level is the exit, the first floor is the upper concourse for Line 10 (Line 12 concourse), the second floor is the platform for Line 12 under construction, the third floor is the lower concourse for Line 10, the fourth floor is the equipment level, and the fifth floor is the platform for Line 10.

The station is a themed station on Line 10, with the theme of "Leisure Life". The upper and lower concourses of the station are mainly white with sky blue lines, and the Line 12 platform is decorated with the uniform white of the standard Line 12 station with blue-green glass curtain wall.

G	-	Exits A, B1, B2, B3, C
L1; Concourse	10 Upper Lobby	Ticket Machines, Customer Service, Security Facilities; Paid area transfer towards Line 6 concourse, Exit B mezzanine level (non-paid area)
L2; 12 Platforms (Unopened)	Platform 6	12 towards Xunfenggang (Martyrs' Park)
L2; 12 Platforms (Unopened)	Island platform, doors will open on the left
L2; 12 Platforms (Unopened)	Platform 5	12 towards Higher Education Mega Center South (Ersha Island)
	Transfer Level	Connects Line 6 mezzanine and Line 10 lower concourse
L3; Concourse	10 Lower Lobby	Ticket Machines, Customer Service, Shops, Police Station, Security Facilities, Toilets, Nursery
L4	Mezzanine	Station Equipment
L5; 10 Platforms	Platform 4	10 towards Xilang (Binjiang East Road)
L5; 10 Platforms	Island platform, doors will open on the left
L5; 10 Platforms	Platform 3	10 towards Yangji East (Wuyangcun)

=== Concourse ===
The concourse is divided into three parts, which are divided into the concourse located on the first floor of the Line 6 station, and the upper concourse on the first floor and the lower concourse on the third floor of the Line 10/12 station. Among them, the upper and lower concourses of Line 10/12 are hollow designed, with an atrium height of 20 meters, which is the highest concourse in Guangzhou's subway network under construction and in operation.

The non-paid areas of the two station sections were dismantled and reconstructed from the original Exit B1 structure of the Line 6 station, with escalators and stairs to the lower concourse to connect to the upper concourse of Line 10, and the additional Exit B3 next to it.

In order to facilitate pedestrian access and transfer, most of the area on the east side of the Line 6 concourse, the east side of the upper concourse of Line 10, and the lower concourse of Line 10 are divided into paid areas except for the southwest corner. There are elevators, escalators and stairs in the paid area connecting to the Line 6 platform. The two-storey paid area of the Line 10/12 concourse is connected by multiple escalators, the upper floor of the Line 12 concourse and the lower floor of the Line 10 concourse have stairs to the corresponding platforms, and there is also a dedicated elevator directly to each floor. As the middle section of Line 12 has not yet been opened, the stairs and escalators leading from the upper and lower concourses of the current Line 10/12 station to the Line 12 platforms are closed.

There are automatic ticket machines and AI customer service centers located on the Line 6 concourse and the upper and lower concourses of Line 10. In addition, toilets and a nursery room are located on the south side of the Line 10 lower concourse.

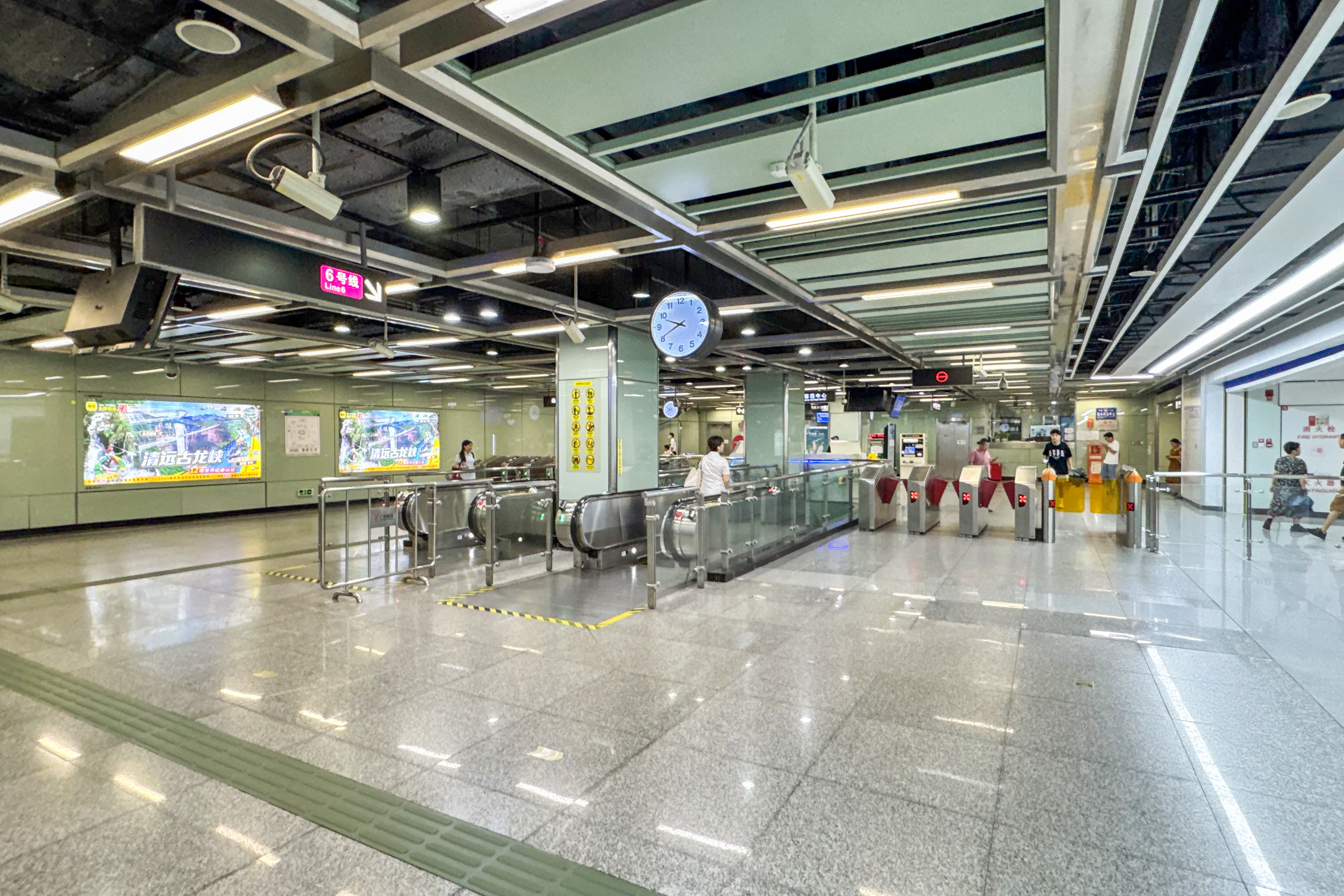
Line 6 concourse

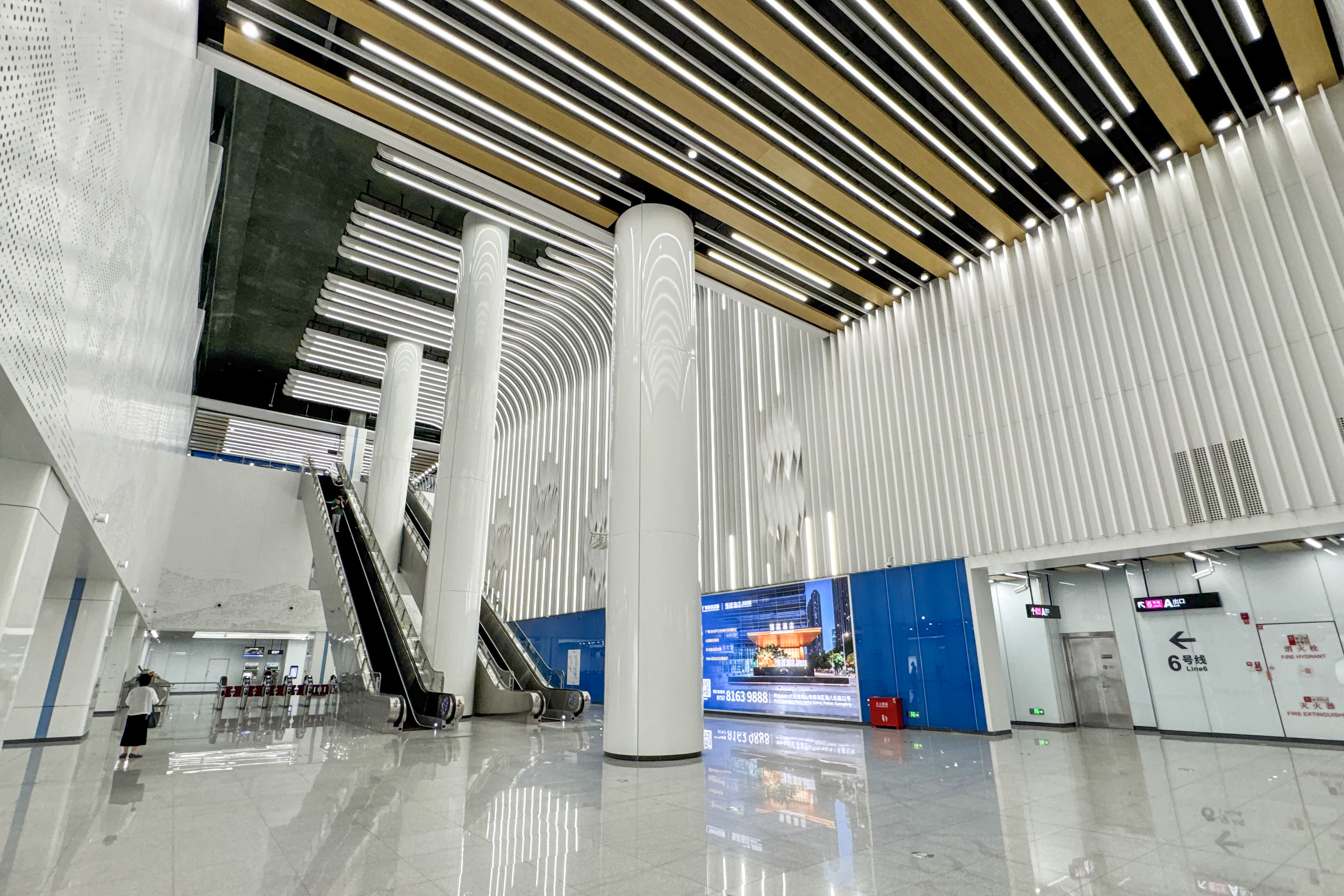
Line 10/12 concourse attrium

=== Transfer method ===
The paid area between the Line 6 station and the Line 10/12 station is connected by two passages: from the Line 6 concourse to the Line 10 upper concourse, and from the Line 10 lower concourse to the Line 6 mezzanine level. Due to having a two-floor transfer design, the two connecting passages are connected by the escalators and stairs of the Line 10/12 station, and the upper floor is connected by a special elevator.

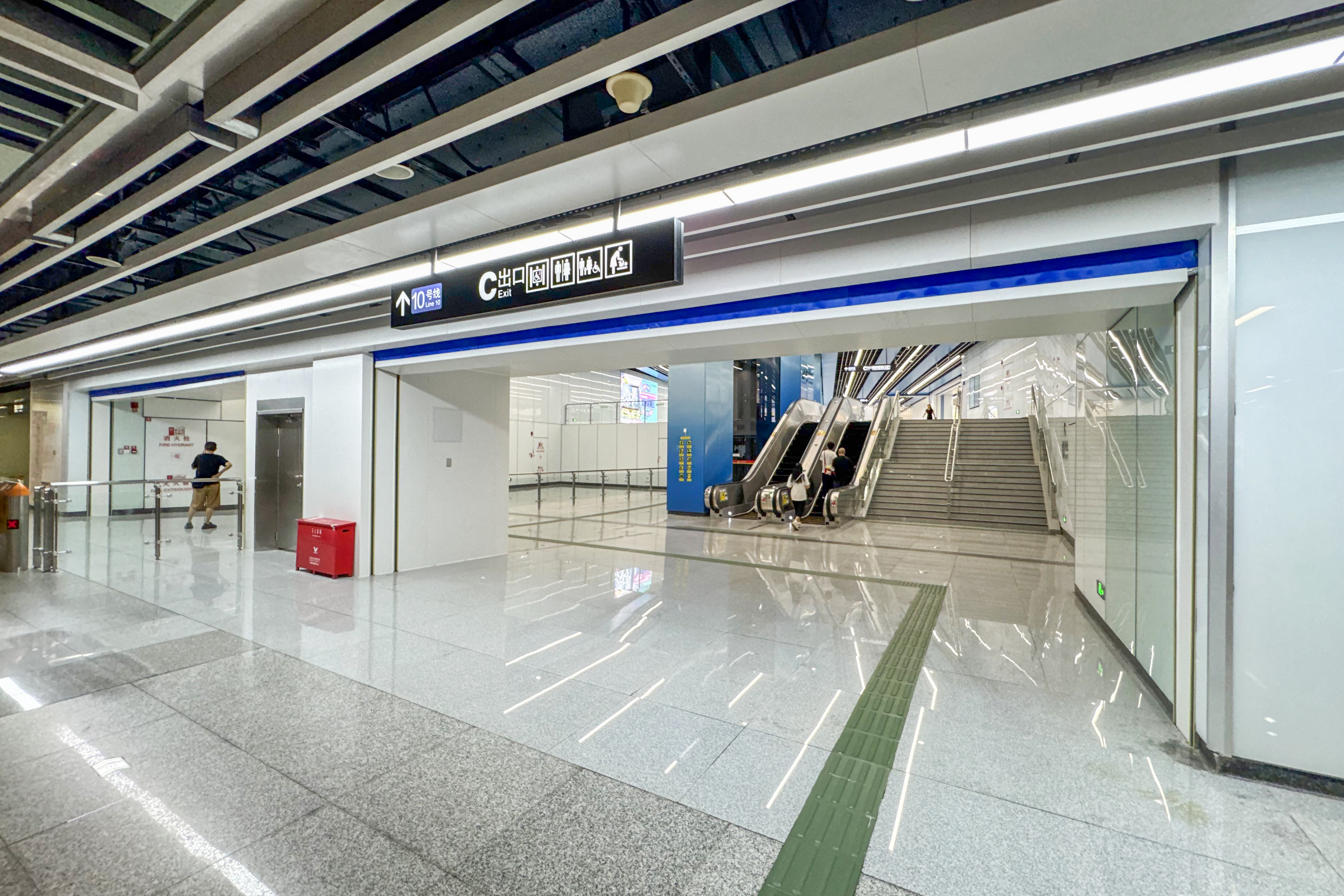
The transfer interface between the station hall of Line 6 and the station body of Line 10/12 is connected by escalators, stairs and lifts in the distance

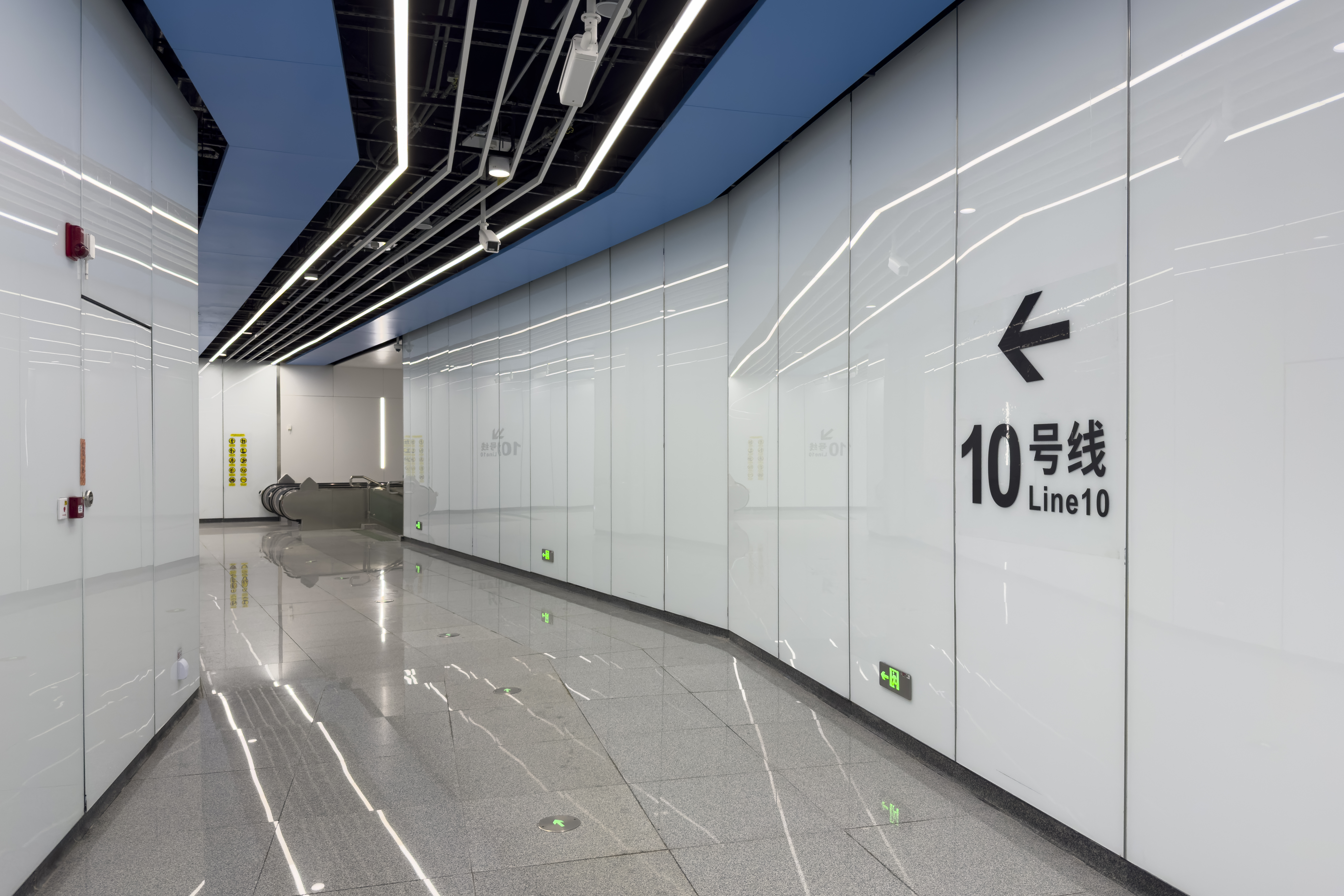
The interchange between Line 6 and Line 10 is located on the lower level

=== Platforms ===
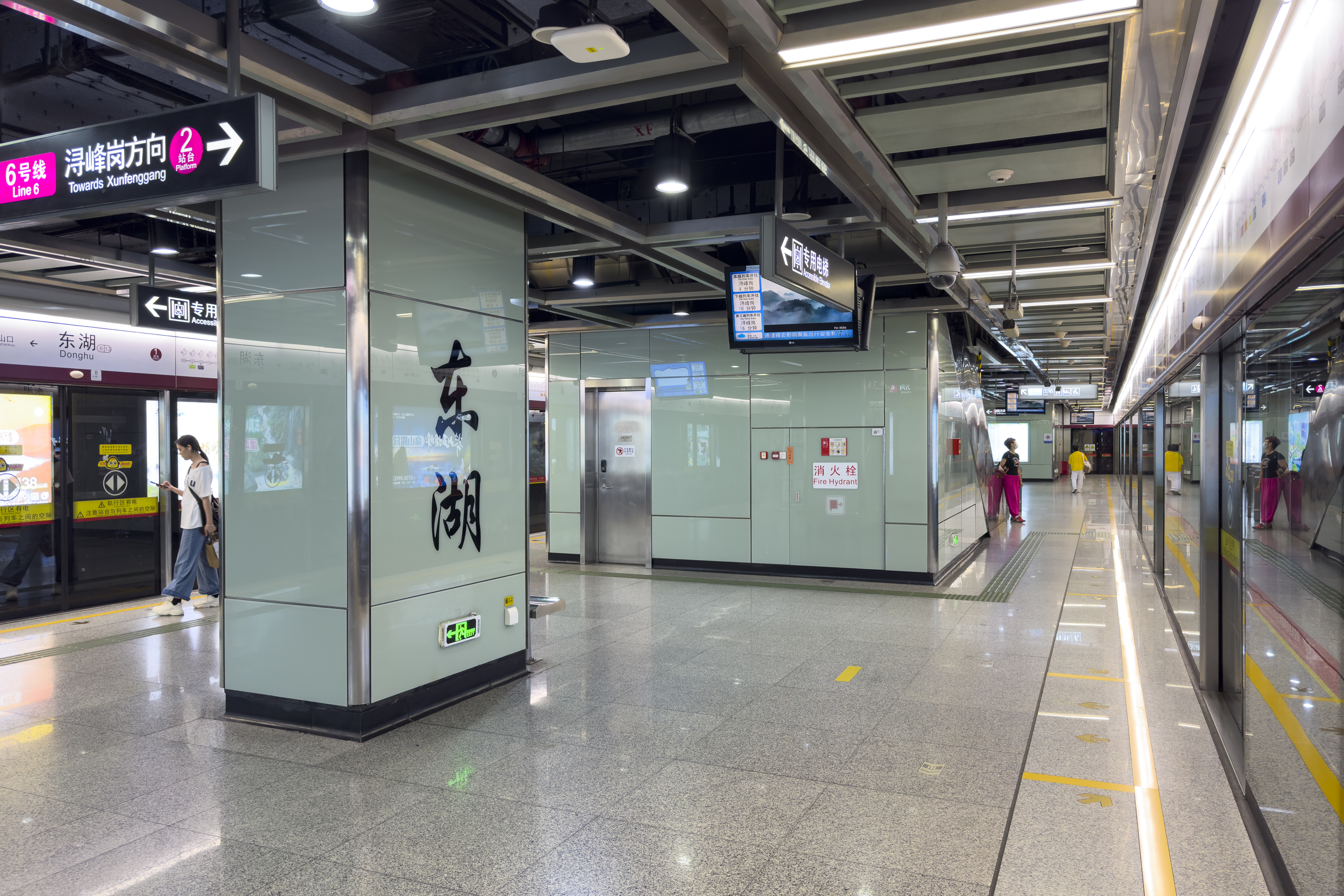
Line 6 platform

Line 6, Line 10 and Line 12 under construction all have island platforms, all located under Dongshan Lake Park. Among them, Line 6 adopts open and closed excavation, and Line 10 and the platform of Line 12 under construction have a stacked platform configuration, with Line 12 on the top and Line 10 on the bottom, and Line 6 in between.

==== Line arrangements ====
There is a storage line at the west end of the platform of Line 6. When there is a fault in the middle section of Line 6, trains heading towards Xunfenggang will turn back through this storage line, with this station serving as the terminal station, and the existing storage line will be used for trains to park overnight at night. At the same time, there is also a single maneuvering line (located below Dongshan Lake Park) at the northern end of Line 10, which is 15.7 meters long.

In addition, the platform part of Line 12 has been completed when the Line 10/12 station structure was opened, but the operation plan of the eastern section of Line 12 can only meet the needs of train turnback at Ersha Island station. The metro had previously considered connecting to Donghu Station through the "bi-directional line" method, but it would affect the departure interval of the eastern section and could not meet the demand for peak passenger flow, so the scheme was abandoned in order to improve the service level.

=== Entrances/exits ===
The station has 5 points of entry/exit. On 1 June 2024, in order to cooperate with the construction of the new line, the original Exit B1 was closed, and a new entrance/exit B1 was built on the south side. When Line 10 became operational and the Line 10/12 station structure opened, new Exits B3 and C were added to the station.

- A: Donghu Road
- B1: Donghu Road
- B2: Donghu Road
- B3: Donghu Road, Dongshan Lake Park
- C: Donghu Road, Dongshan Lake Park, Site of the Third CPC National Congress

Exit B1 is equipped with a stairlift, and Exit C is equipped with an elevator.

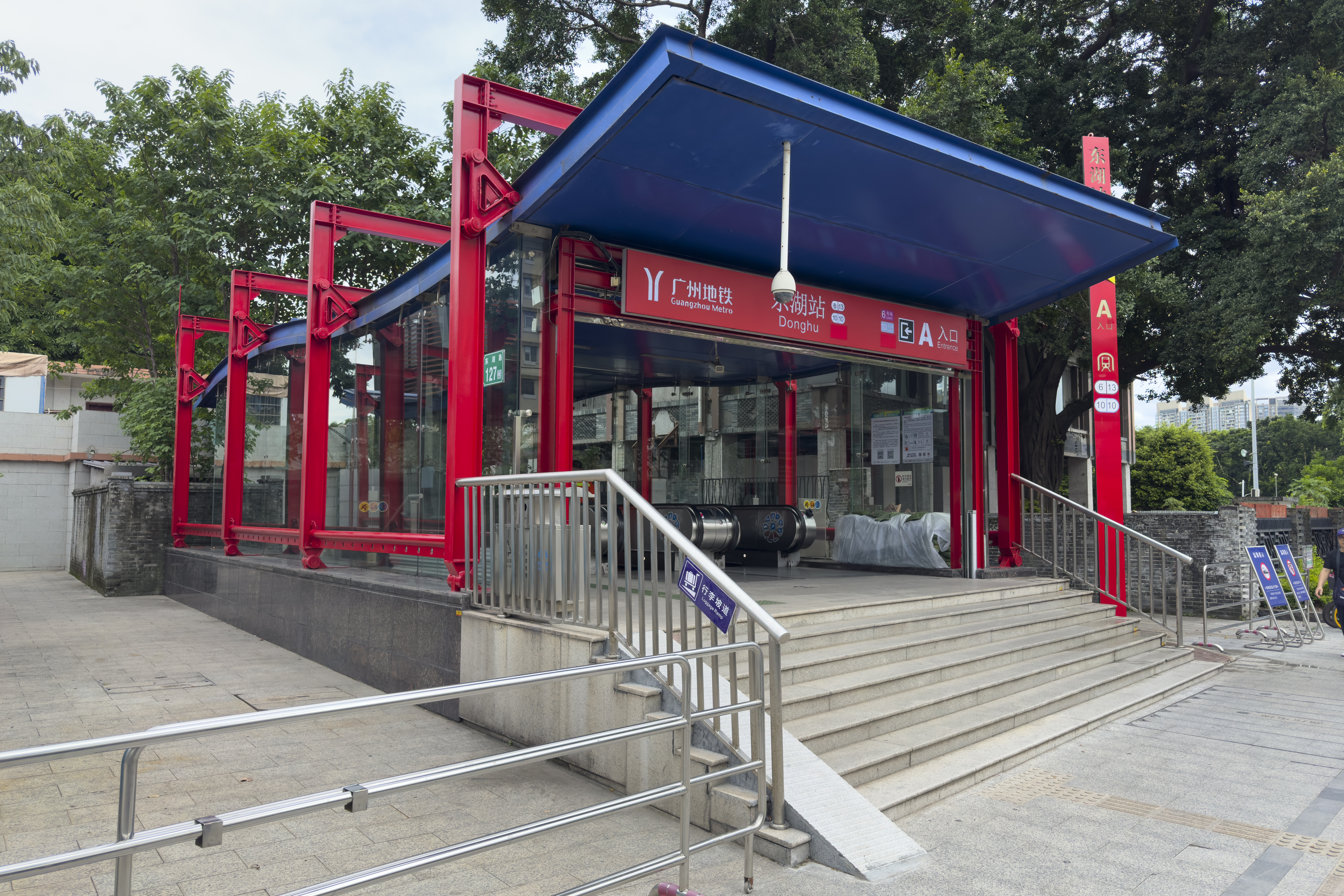
Entrance A

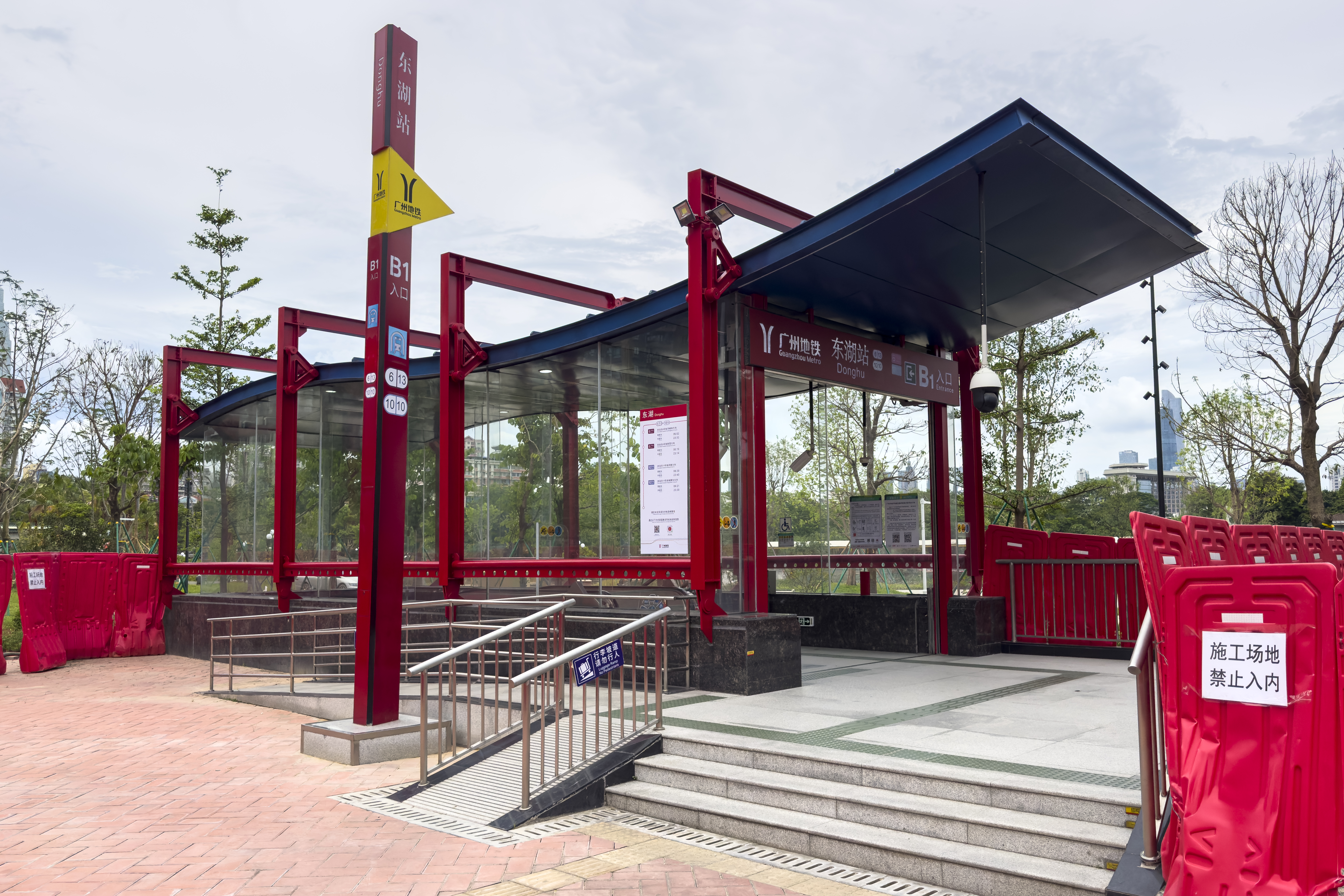
Entrance B1

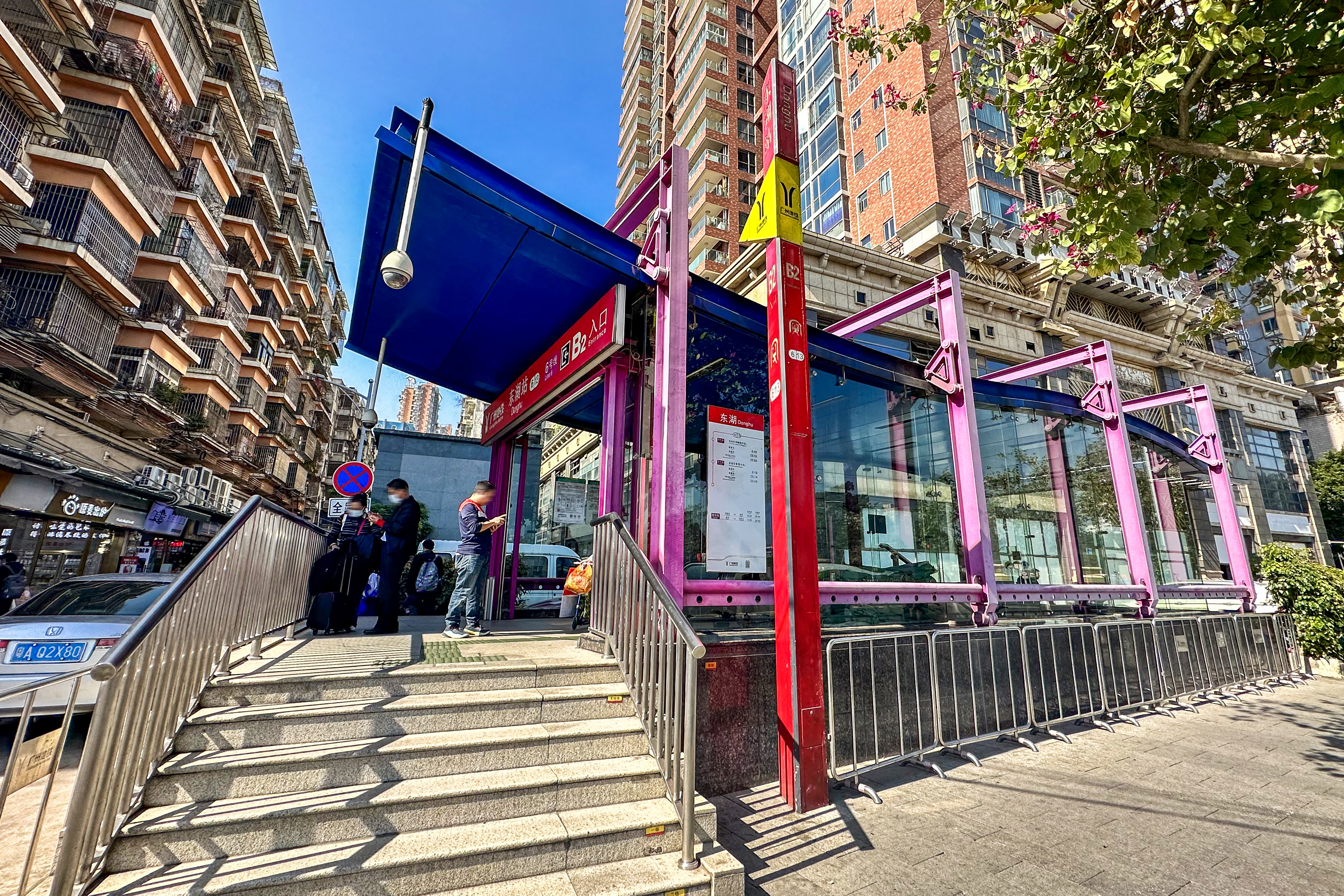
Entrance B2

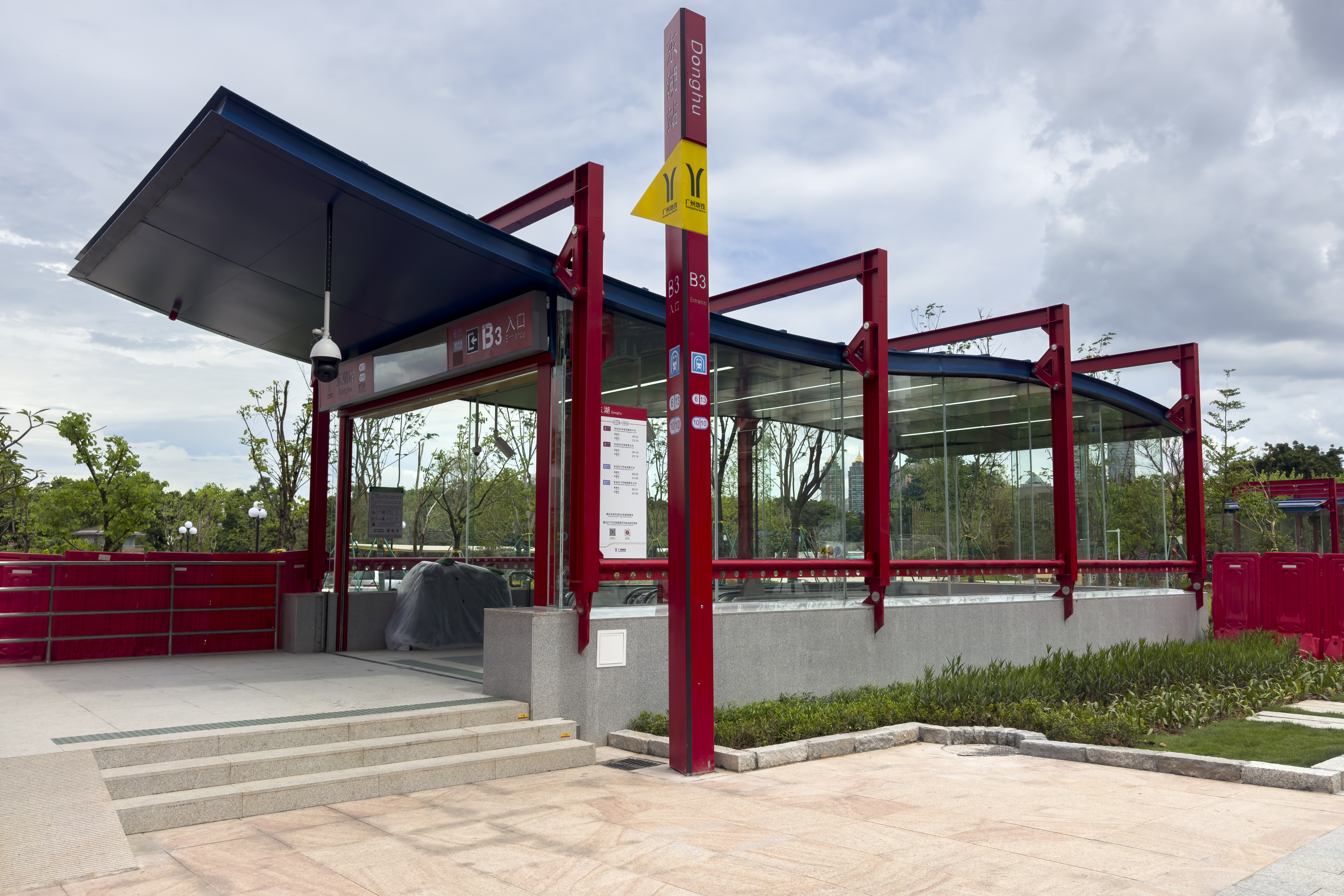
Entrance B3

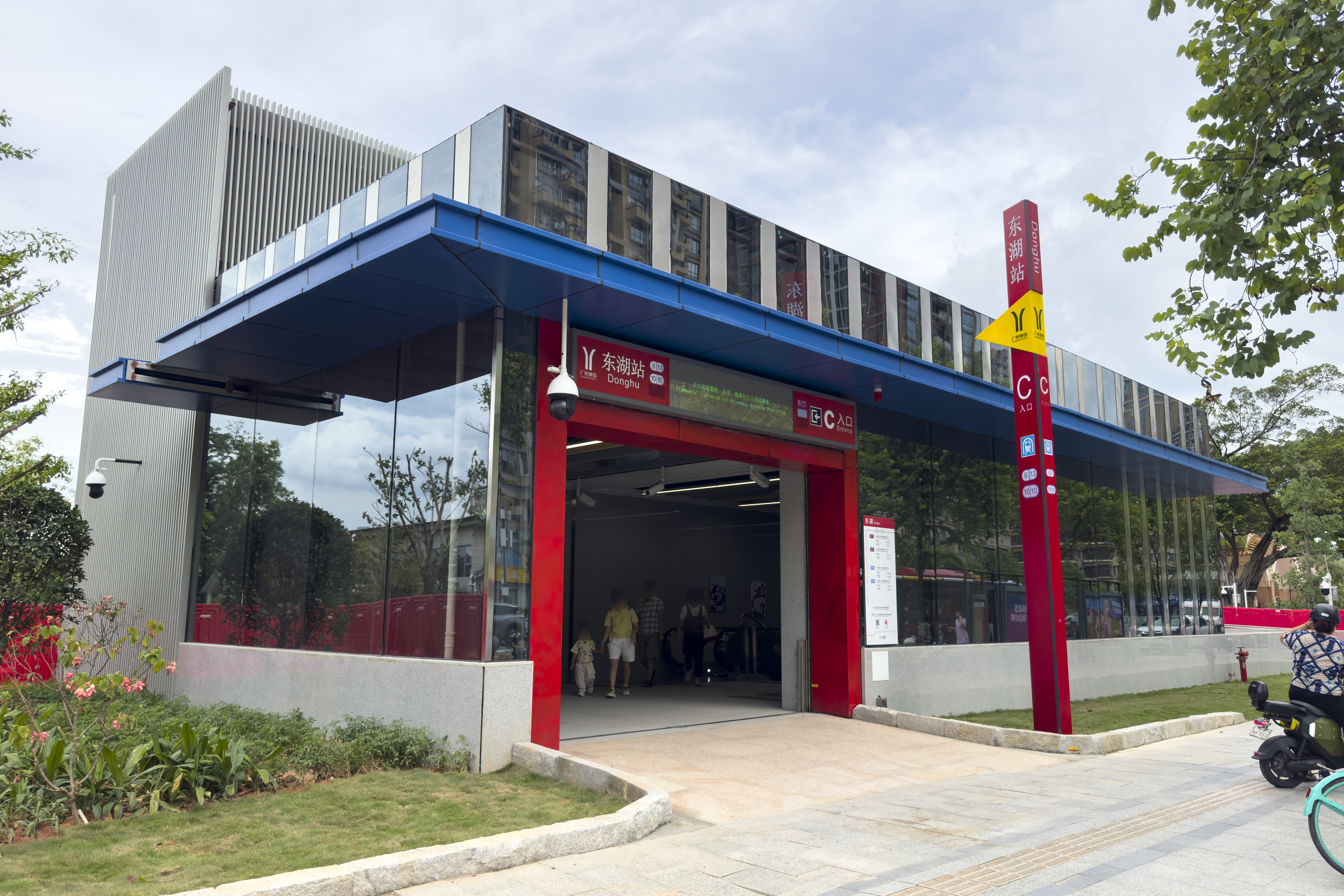
Entrance C

== History ==
The station first appeared in the Guangzhou Rail Traffic Planning Plan in 2003 and is one of the stations on Line 6.

On 26 June 2008, the roof slab of the Line 6 station structure was sealed, making it the first topped out station of Line 6. On 10 August 2013, most of the stations on Line 6 were transferred to the General Headquarters of Operations for management. On 28 December the same year, the station opened with the official opening of the initial phase of Line 6.

=== Line 10/12 ===
The construction of the Line 10/12 station began in late April 2019, the roof slab was sealed in early November 2021, and the station completed the "three rights" transfer on 21 April 2025. On 29 June 2025, the station structure (apart from the Line 12 platforms) was opened, and the station became an interchange station.

=== Construction incident ===
On the evening of 15 April 2008, during the routine opening and inspection of the tunnel boring machine in the section from this station to Huanghuagang station, it encountered an explosion caused by an unknown gas leakage, resulting in 2 deaths and 5 injuries to the construction personnel. Experts preliminarily judged that the serious exceedance of harmful gases such as methane and carbon monoxide at the accident site was the cause of the deflagration during the opening of the tunnel boring machine.

In October 2010, the construction site of the station was criticized by the authorities for violating the Asian Games stoppage order.

== Future development ==
Line 25 is planned to have a station here, but it is a long-term line, and no specific information is known.
