= Wuyangcun station =

Guangzhou Metro interchange station

Wuyangcun 五羊邨
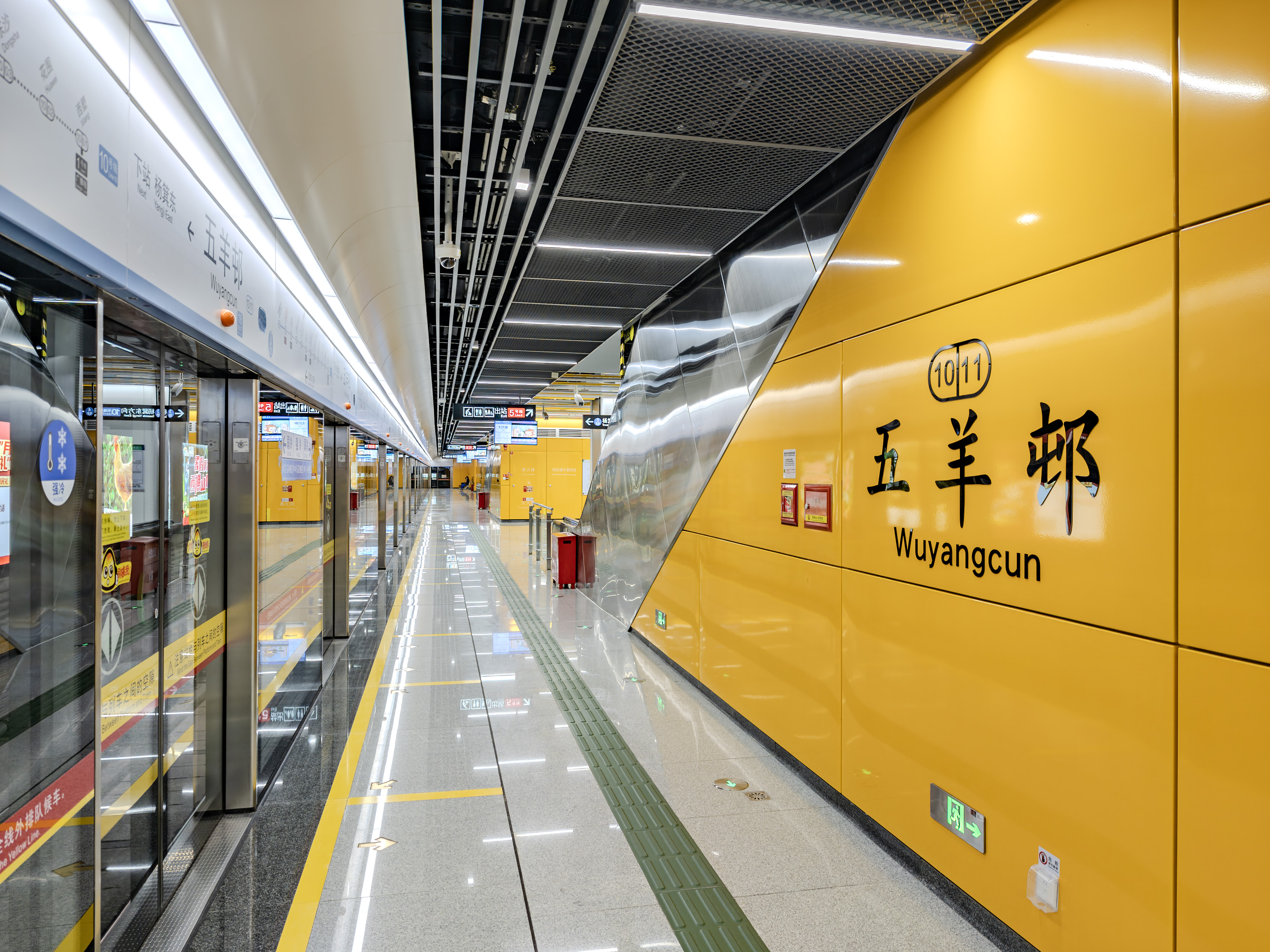
- Platform 3 of Line 10 (towards Yangji East)

Chinese name
- Chinese: 五羊邨站
- Literal meaning: Wuyang (Five Rams) Estate station
Transcriptions
Standard Mandarin
- Hanyu Pinyin: Wǔyángcūn Zhàn
Yue: Cantonese
- Yale Romanization: Ńghyèuhngchyūn Jaahm
- Jyutping: Ng^{5}joeng^{4}cyun^{1} Zaam^{6}
- Hong Kong Romanization: Ng Yeung Chuen station

General information
- Location: West side of the intersection of Siyou New Road (寺右新马路) and Guangzhou Avenue (广州大道); Dongshan Subdistrict, Yuexiu District, Guangzhou, Guangdong; China
- Coordinates: 23°07′11″N 113°18′53″E
- Operator: Guangzhou Metro Co. Ltd.
- Lines: Line 5; Line 10
- Platforms: 4 (2 island platforms)
- Tracks: 4

Construction
- Structure type: Underground
- Accessible: Yes

Other information
- Station code: 512 1011

History
- Opened: Line 5: 28 December 2009 (16 years ago); Line 10: 29 June 2025 (13 months ago)

Services
Preceding station	Guangzhou Metro	Following station
Yangji towards Jiaokou	Line 5	Zhujiang New Town towards Huangpu New Port
Donghu towards Xilang	Line 10	Yangji East Terminus
Future Line 3 branch dismantling section
Donghu towards Xilang	Line 10	Yangji East towards Tianhe Coach Terminal
Location

Wuyangcun station (Chinese: 五羊邨站; Jyutping: ng^{5} joeng^{4} cyun^{1} zaam^{6}; Cantonese Yale: Ńghyèuhngchyūn Jaahm), formerly Wuyang New Town station (五羊新城站; ng^{5} joeng^{4} san^{1} sing^{4} zaam^{6}) during planning, is an interchange station between Line 5 and Line 10 of the Guangzhou Metro. It is located under the junction of Siyou New Road (寺右新马路) and Guangzhou Avenue (广州大道), in Wuyang New Town, Yuexiu District. It opened on 28 December 2009. On 29 June 2025, Line 10 started operations, and the station became an interchange station.

== Station layout ==
The station is divided into two sections, Line 5 and Line 10, both under Siyou New Road, with Line 5 on the east side and Line 10 on the west side. It is surrounded by Guangzhou Avenue Middle, Siyou New Road, Siyou 2nd Road, Wuyang New Town and other nearby buildings.

=== Line 5 ===
The Line 5 station is a three-storey underground station. The ground level is the exit, the first floor is the concourse, the second floor is the equipment level, and the third floor is the platform for Line 5.

G	-	Exits A-D
L1; Concourse	Lobby	Ticket Machines, Customer Service, Shops, Police Station, Security Facilities, Toilets, Nursery; Transfer passage towards Line 10 (U/C)
L2; Equipment Area	-	Station Equipment
L3; Platforms	Platform 2	5 towards Jiaokou (Yangji)
L3; Platforms	Island platform, doors will open on the left
L3; Platforms	Platform 1	5 towards Huangpu New Port (Zhujiang New Town)

=== Line 10 ===
The Line 10 station is a five-storey underground station. The ground level is the exit, the first floor is the transfer level between the exits and concourse, the second floor is the transfer passage to Line 5, the third floor is the concourse, the fourth floor is the equipment level, and the fifth floor is the platform for Line 10.

G	-	Exits E and F
L1	Transfer level	Towards concourse and exits Station Equipment
L2	Transfer passage	Towards Line 5 (U/C)
L3; Concourse	Lobby	Ticket Machines, Customer Service, Shops, Police Station, Security Facilities, Toilets, Nursery
L4; Equipment Area	-	Station Equipment
L5; Platforms	Platform 4	10 towards Xilang (Donghu)
L5; Platforms	Island platform, doors will open on the left
L5; Platforms	Platform 3	10 towards Yangji East (terminus)

=== Concourse ===
The concourse is divided into two parts, Line 5 and Line 10, which are connected by a paid area transfer passage under construction. There are automatic ticket machines and AI intelligent customer service centers in both concourses. The Line 5 concourse also has convenience stores, lottery shops, other shops as well as self-service facilities such as automatic vending machines, shared charging stations and card vending machines.

There are elevators, escalators, and stairs in the fare-paid areas of the Line 5 and Line 10 concourses for passengers to reach the platforms.

Toilets and a nursery room are located in both the Line 5 and Line 10 concourses. The Line 5 concourse toilets are located near Exit A, and the nursery room is located near Exit D within the unpaid area. The Line 10 concourse toilets and a nursery room are located next to the elevator in the paid area. There are also automated external defibrillators near Exit A for the Line 5 concourse and next to the station control center for the Line 10 concourse. It is worth mentioning that this station on Line 5 was the first underground station in Guangzhou to be equipped with toilets when it was first opened.

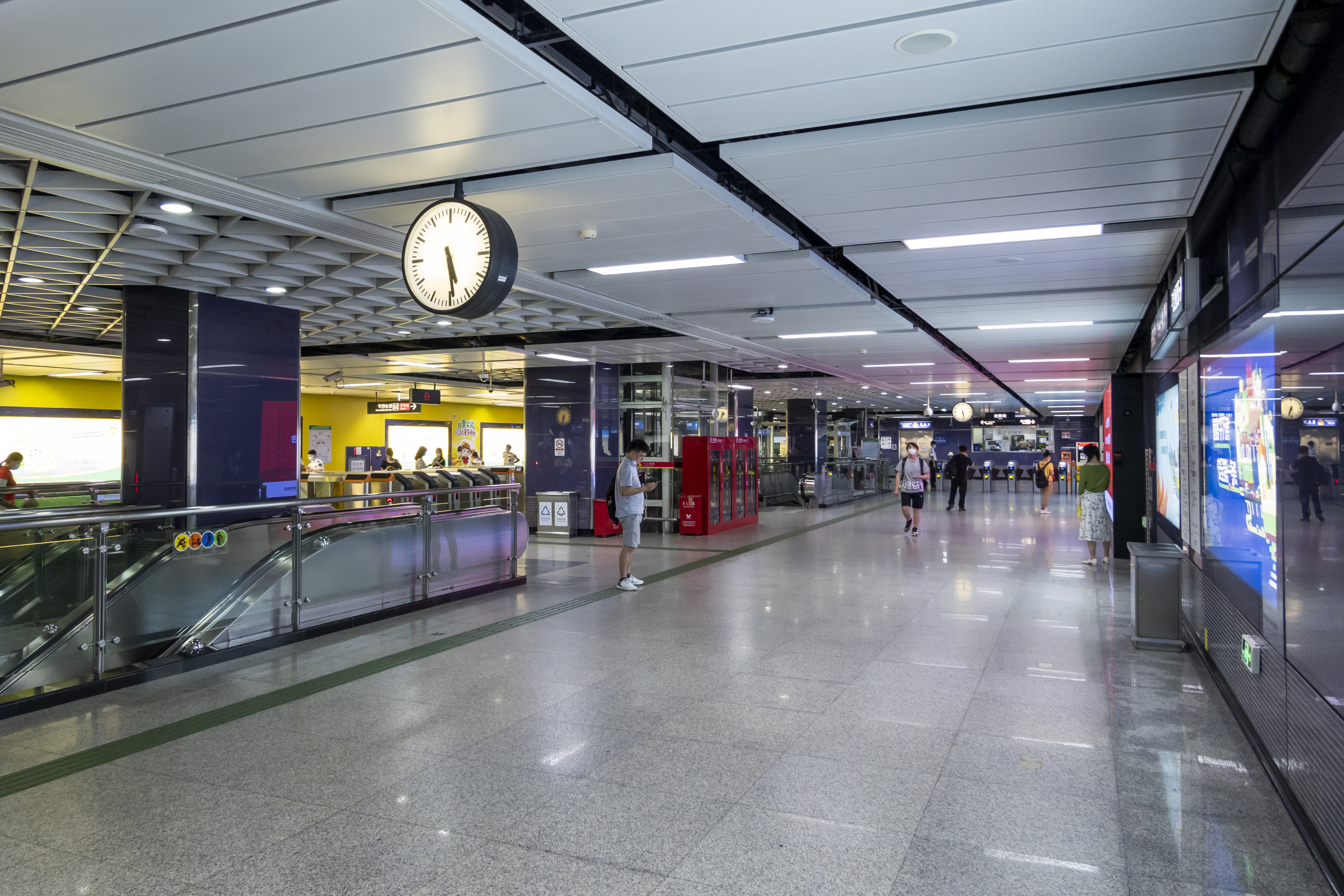
Line 5 concourse

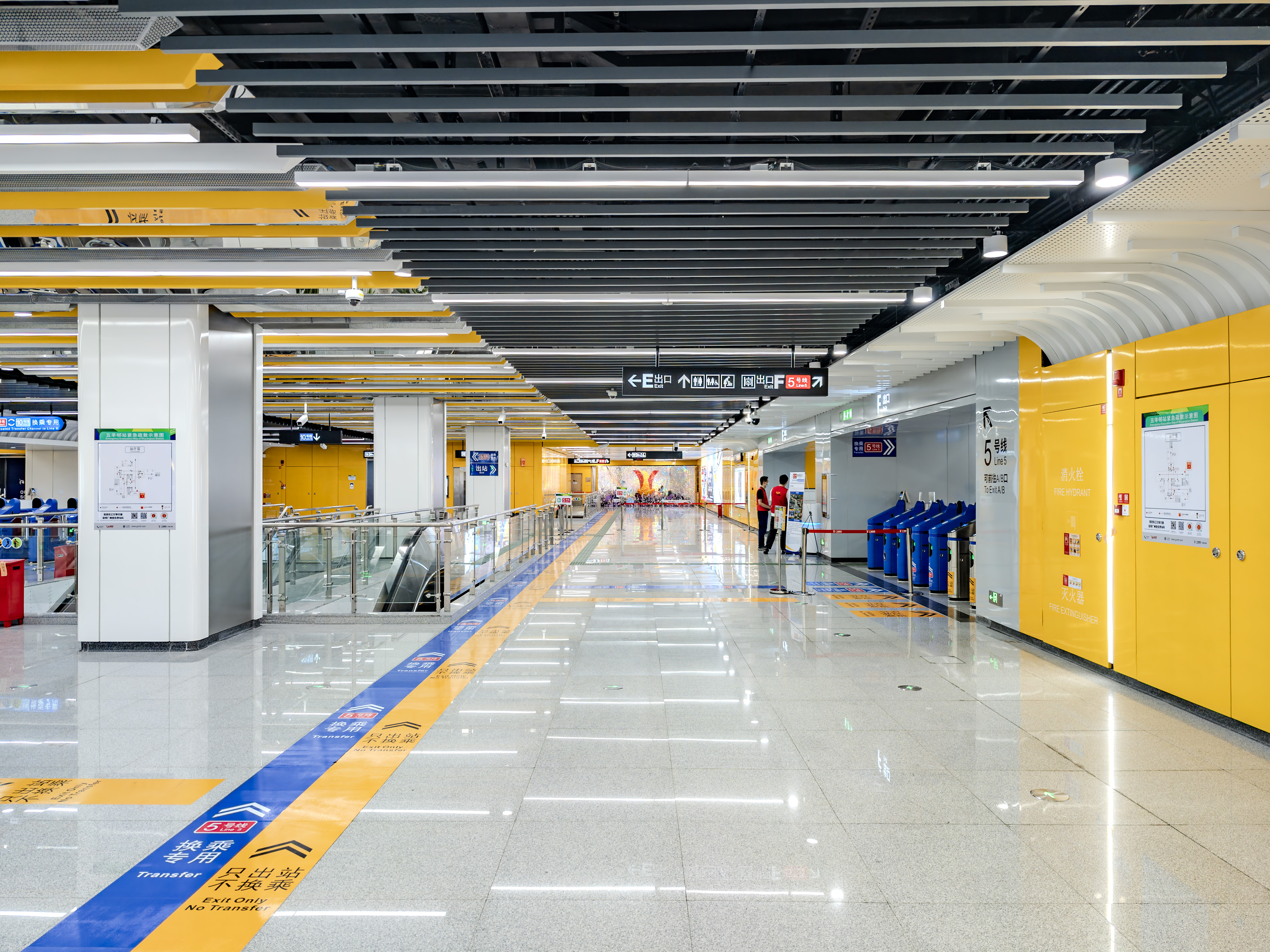
Line 10 concourse

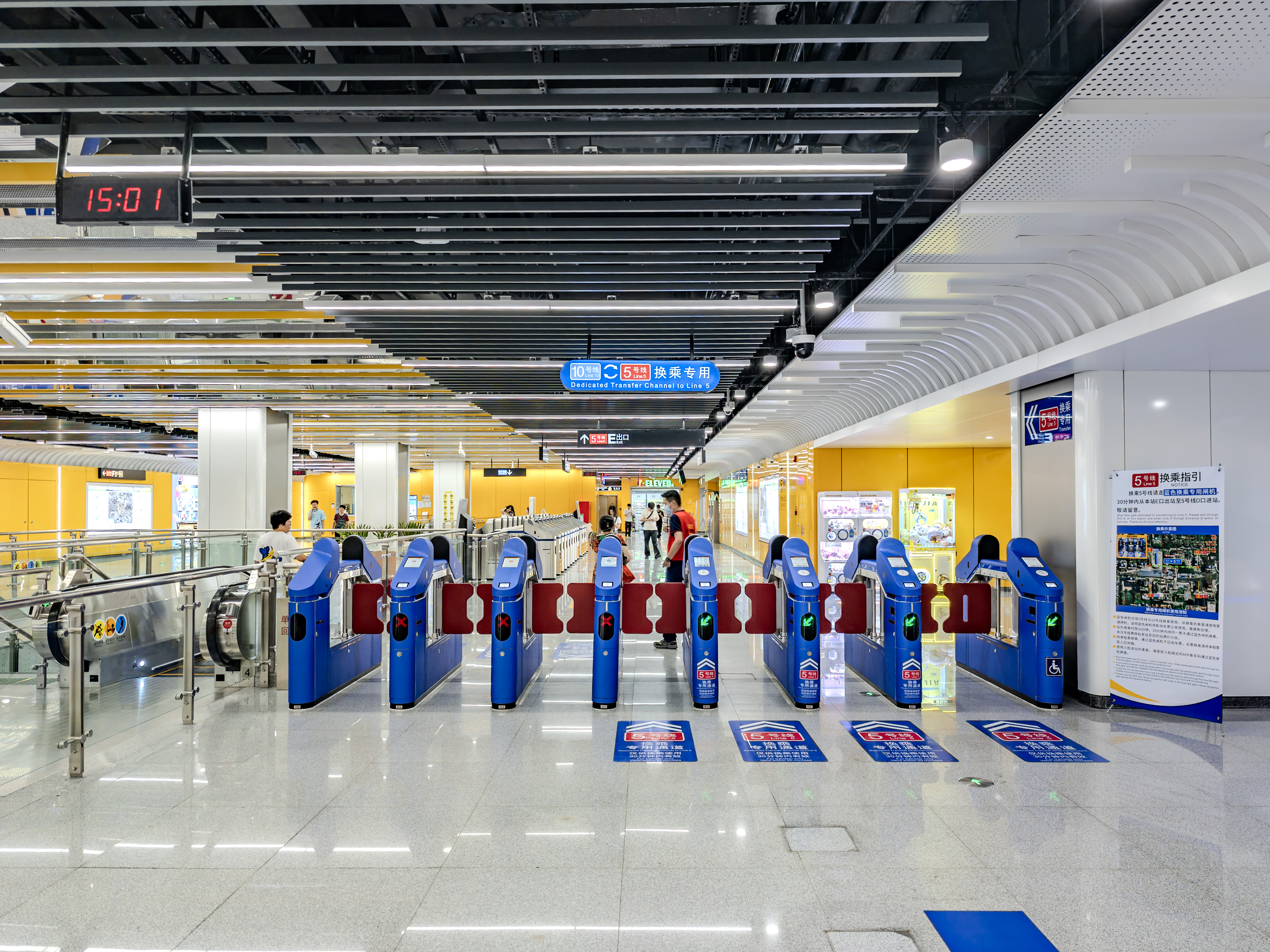
Line 10 blue transfer faregates

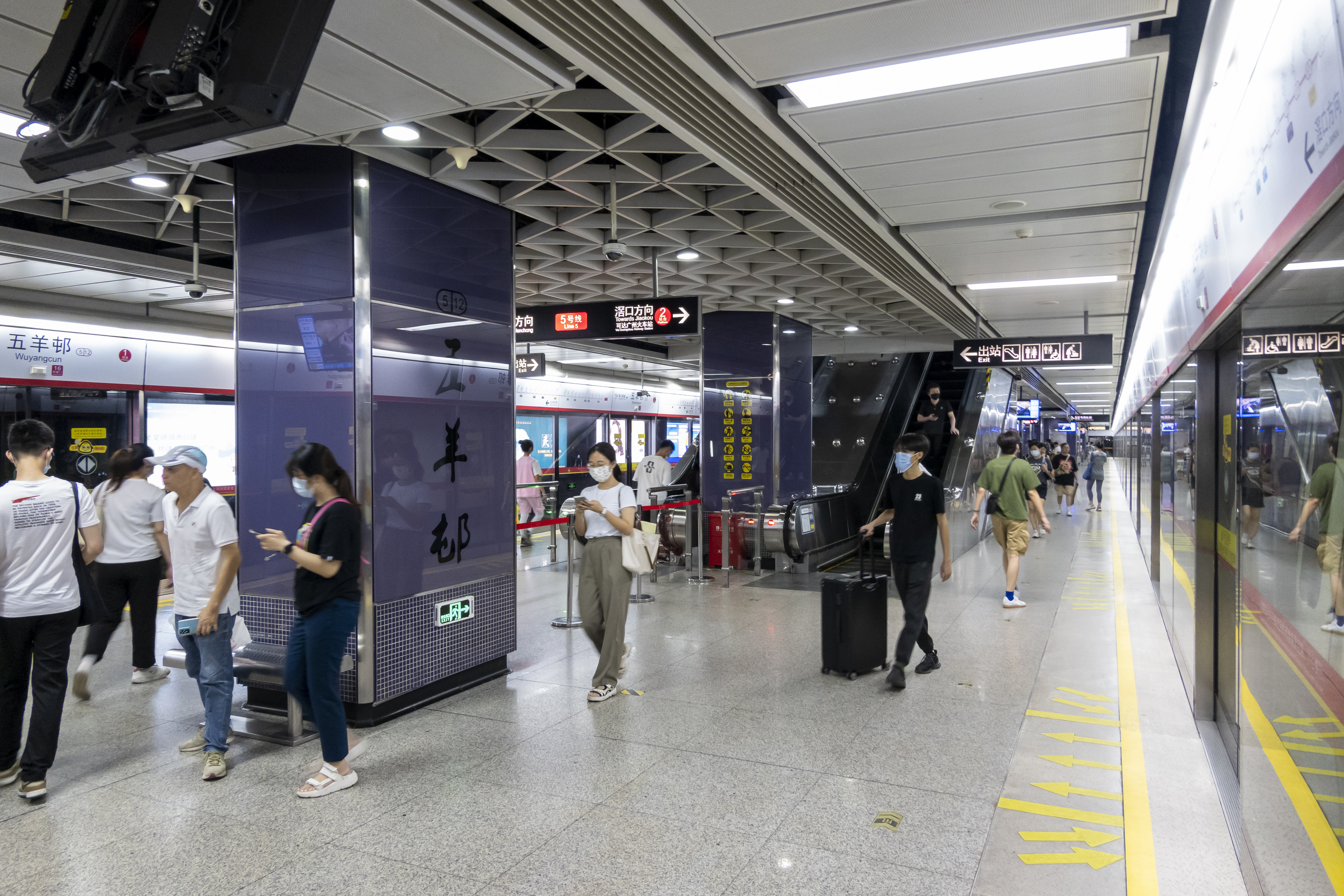
Line 5 platform

=== Transfer method ===
The station is designed with transfers in mind during the design Line 10, and a transfer passage will be constructed between the Line 10 concourse and the west side of the Line 5 concourse near Exit A. Due to the slow progress of the construction of the transfer passage, it could not be opened in the initial stage of the opening of Line 10, and the station needs to implement a virtual transfer via an out-of-station interchange (OSI). Similar to Pazhou station, which implemented the virtual transfer method earlier, passengers can be regarded as transferring at the same station within 30 minutes after exiting the station through the blue turnstile dedicated to transfer and will not affect the calculation of fares. Holders of single-journey tickets and other types of tickets can also use virtual transfers, and one-way tickets will not be collected when exiting the dedicated turnstile. However, security checks are still required when you re-enter the station. The walking distance between Exit A of Line 5 and Exit F of Line 10 is around 6 minutes.

=== Platforms ===
The station has island platforms for both Line 5 and Line 10, in which both are located under Siyou New Road. Line 5 is located on the upper floor on the east side, and Line 10 is located on the lower floor on the west side.

=== Entrances/exits ===
Wuyangcun has 6 points of entry/exit. Line 5 has four (A-D) and Line 10 has two (E-F). Exits A and F are equipped with elevators.

- A: Siyou New Road
- B: Guangzhou Avenue Middle, Guangzhou CPPCC Culture and History Exhibition Center
- C: Guangzhou Avenue Middle, Nanfang Daily Newspaper Group
- D: Siyou New Road, Guangzhou Tieyi High School
- E: Siyou New Road, Guangzhou Tieyi High School
- F: Siyou New Road
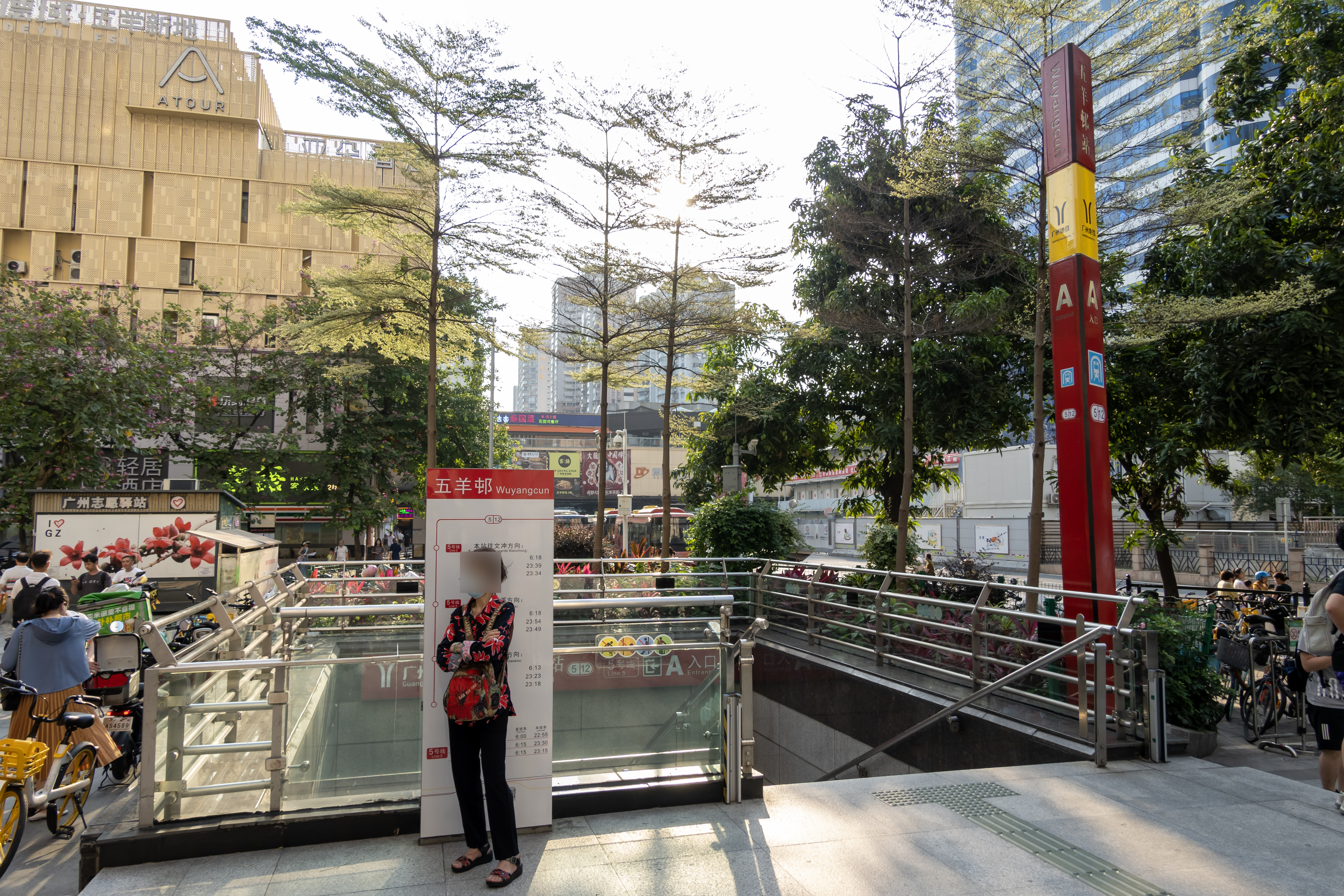
Entrance A

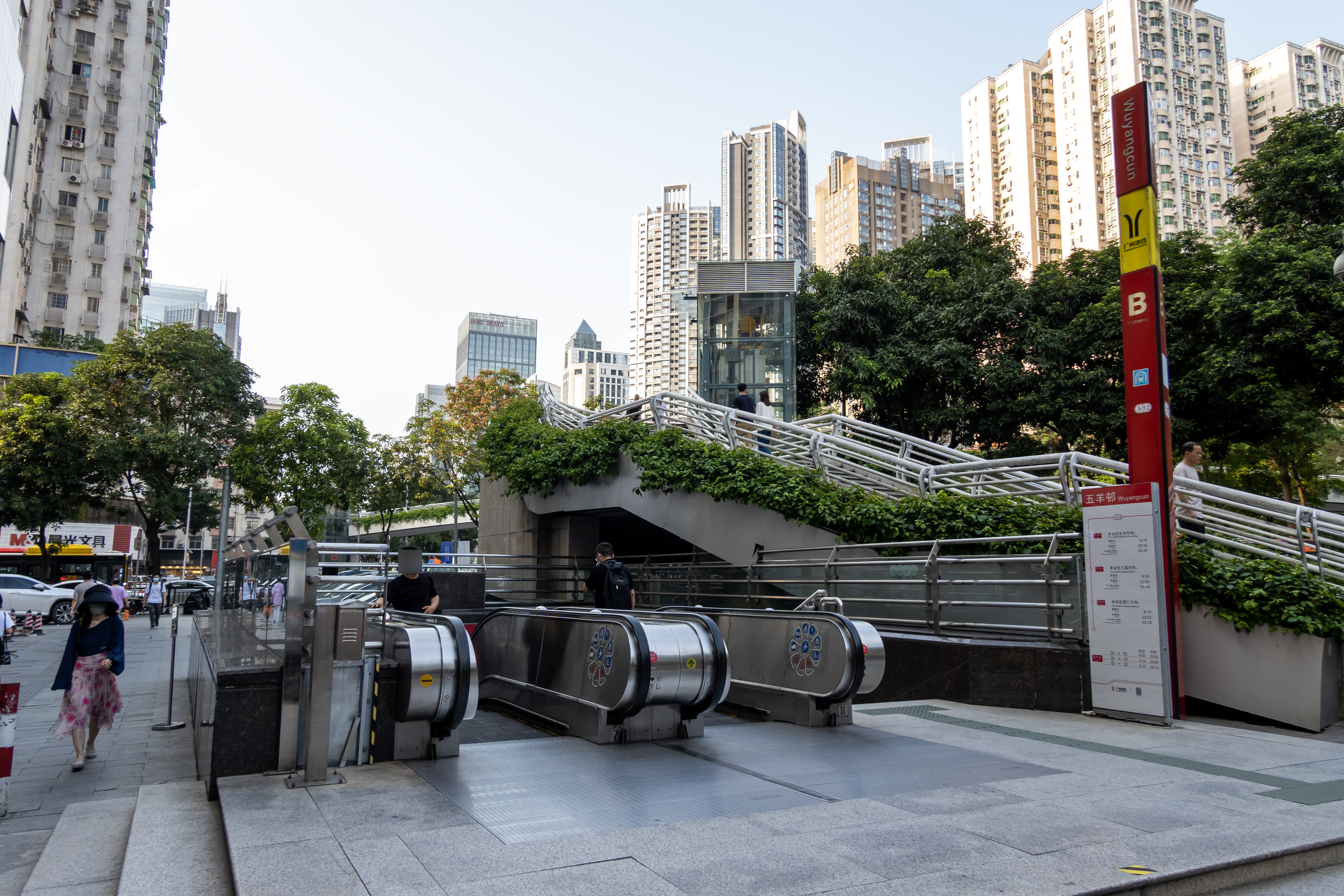
Entrance B

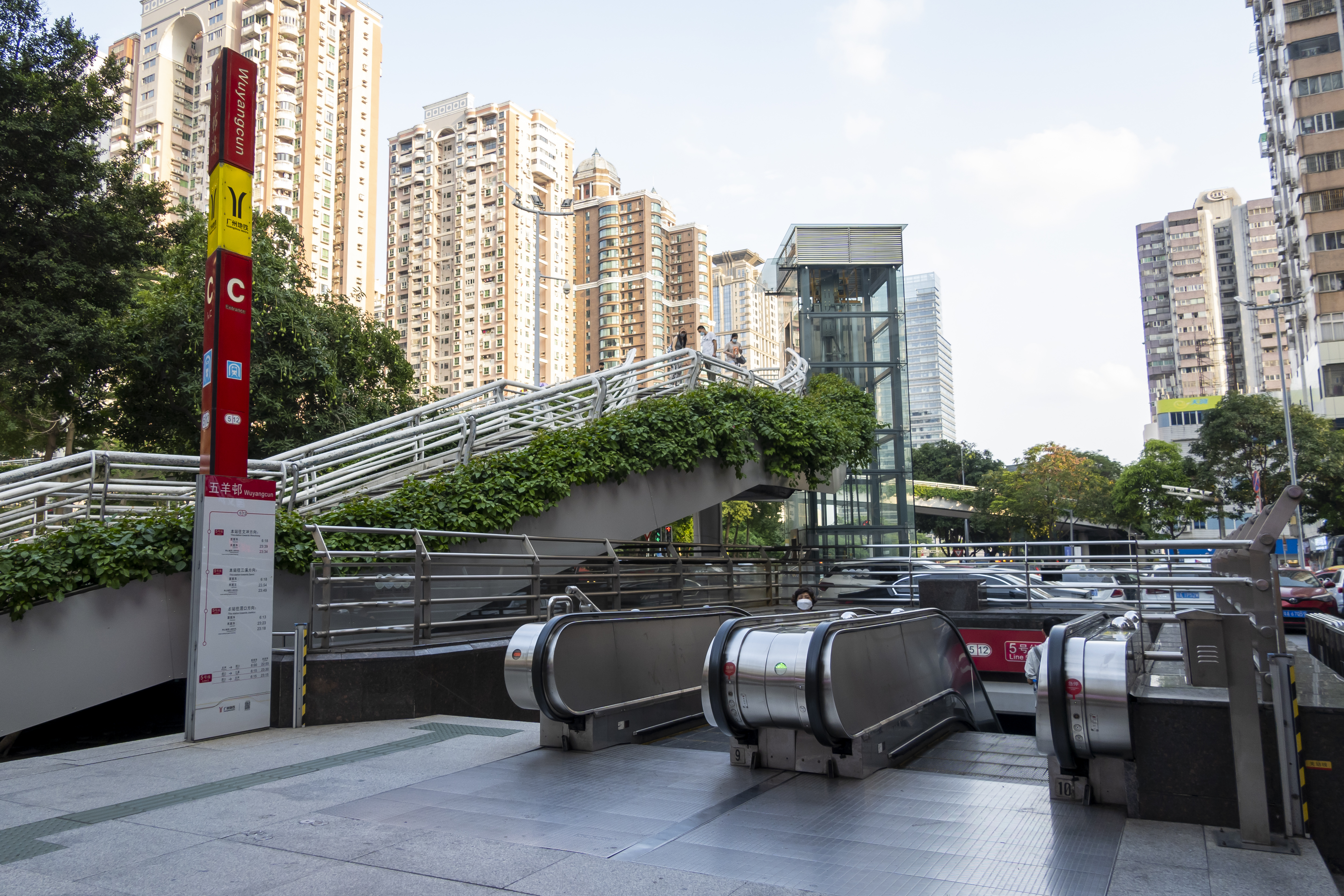
Entrance C

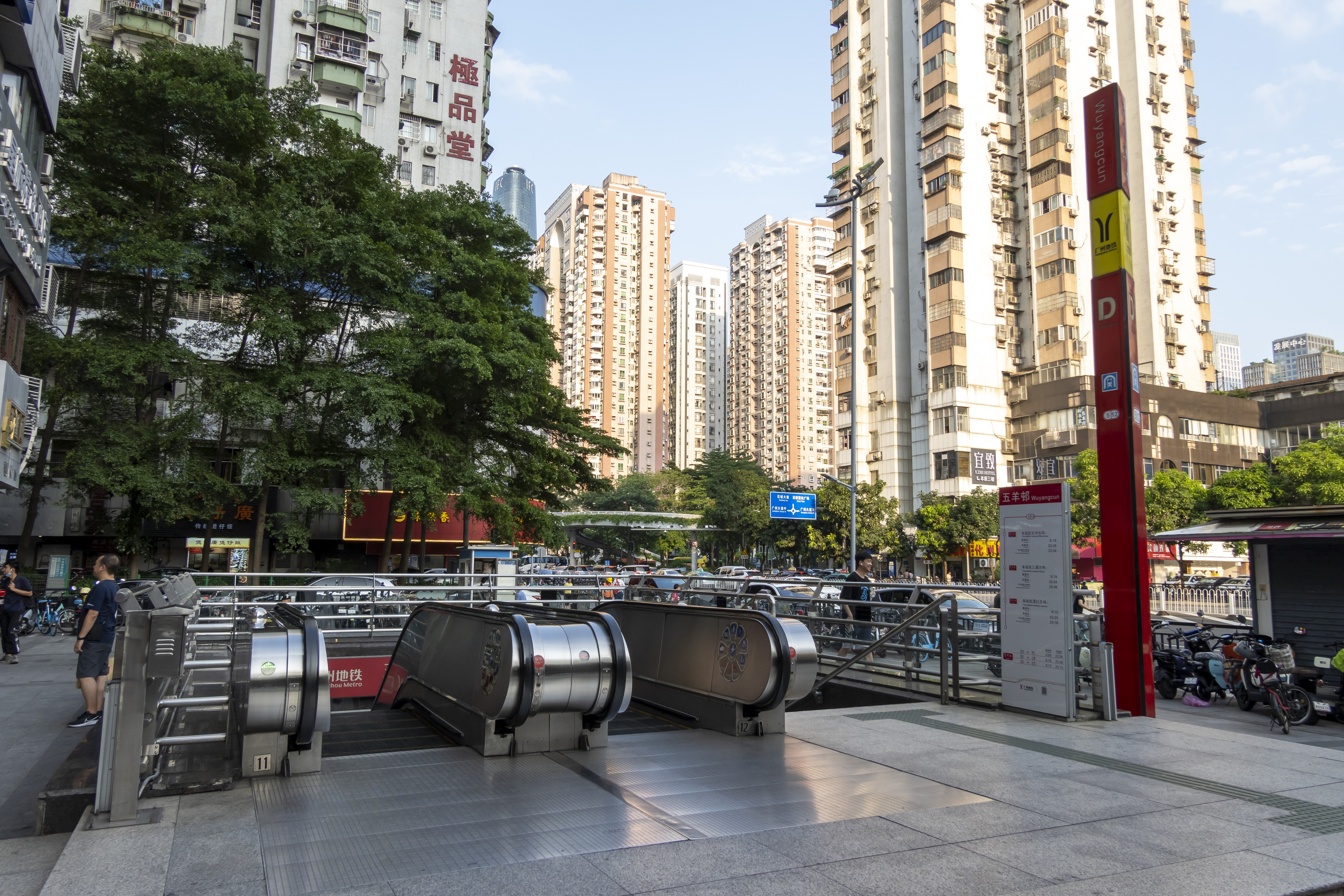
Entrance D

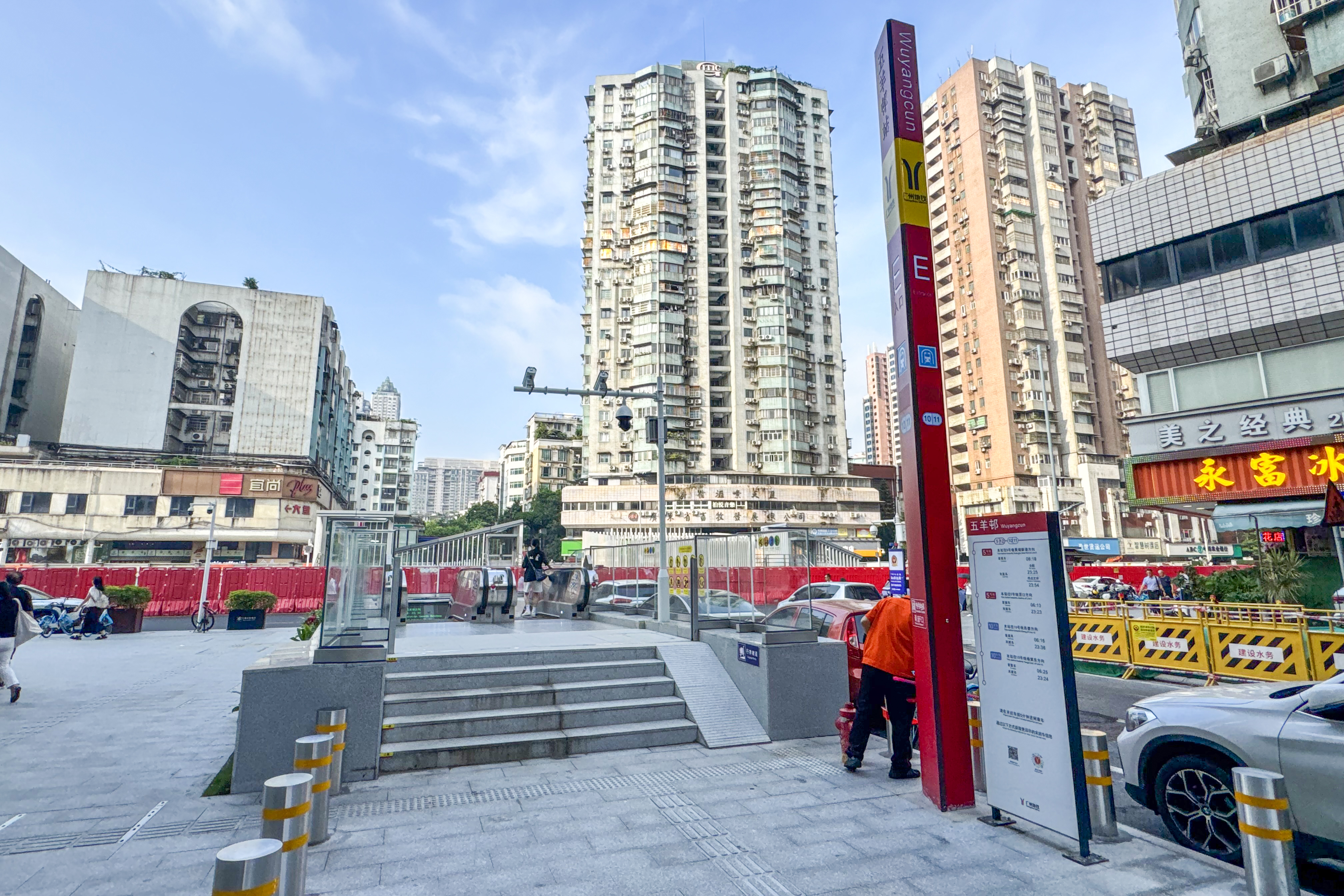
Entrance E

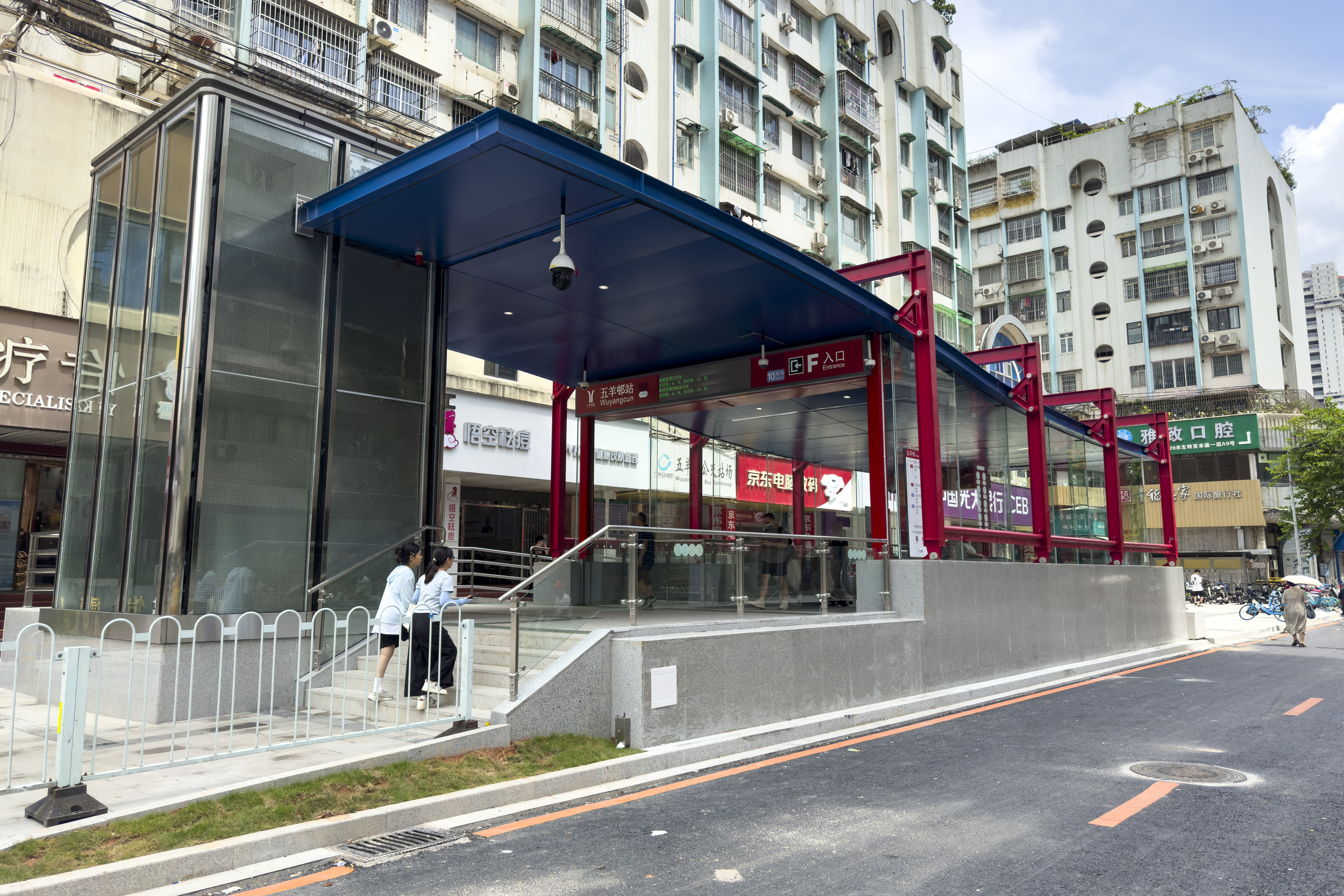
Entrance F

== History ==
=== Line 5 ===
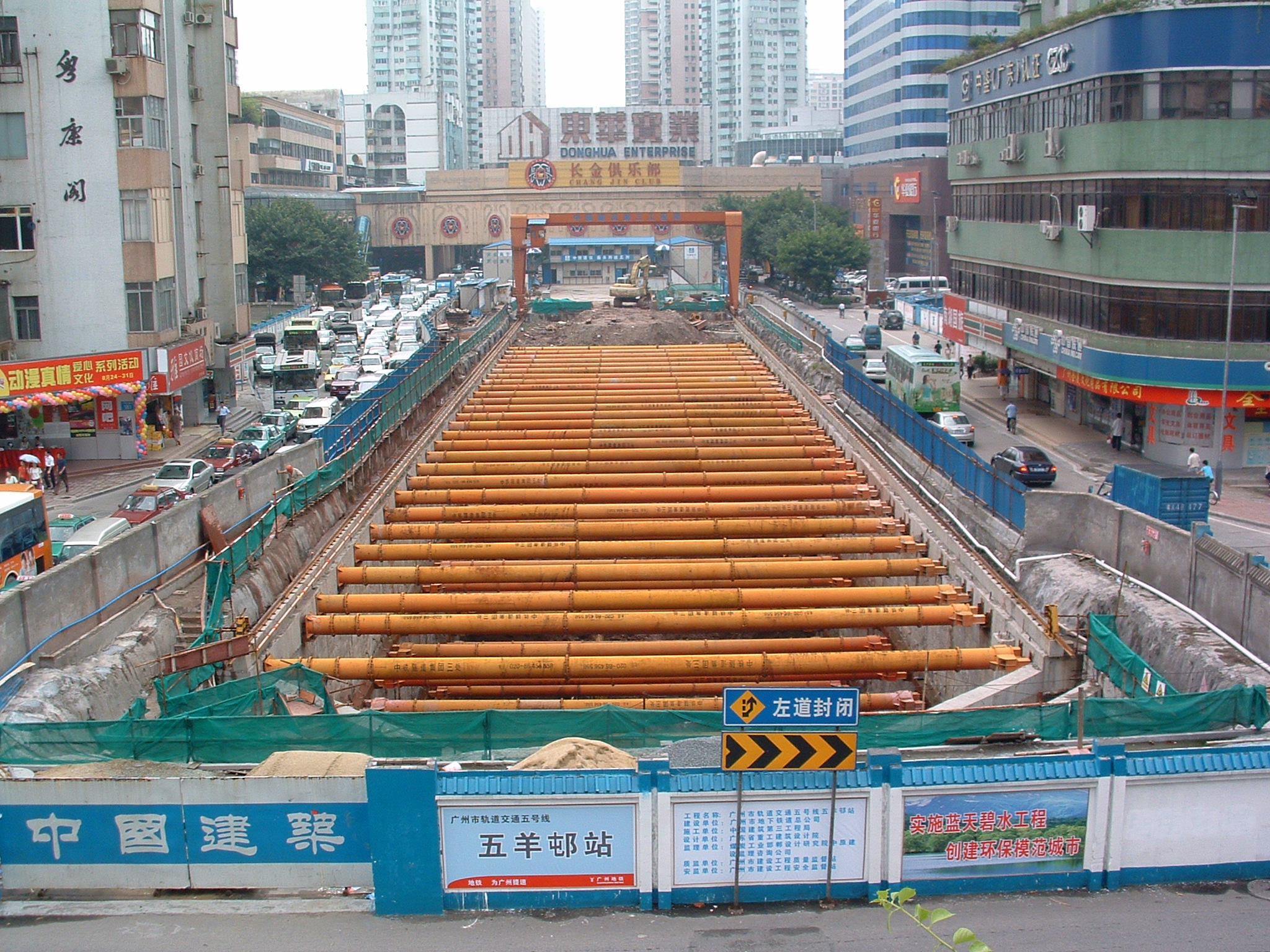
Wuyangcun Station under construction

In the 1997 "Guangzhou City Urban Rapid Rail Traffic Network Planning Research (Final Report)", the then Line 3 passed through Xicun and continued along West Huanshi Road to reach the area of Zhujiang New Town, and this station was set up on the way, which appeared as Wuyang New Town station at that time. Later, in the 2003 proposal, Line 3 was renumbered Line 5, and the station was confirmed to be one of the stations of the current Line 5, and construction was implemented.

On 26 June 2006, construction of the station officially began with the full Line 5. On the eve of its opening, the station was named Wuyangcun station. On 28 December 2009, the station opened with the start of trial operation of Line 5.

=== Line 10 ===
In the early days of planning, Line 10 had a Siyou Xinmalu station on the west side of Yangji Estate. Due to the distance from Wuyangcun Station of Line 5, it was not designed as an interchange station. Later, the station was moved eastward to the east side of Yangji East, but because the demolition volume and construction restrictions of the scheme were large, the station continued to move eastward to its current location. Later, at the preliminary design review of Line 10, experts commented that the two stations should be considered for an interchange. Subsequently, it was stated in the tender documents of the Line 10 EPC project that the Siyou Xinmalu station was located close to Wuyangcun Station of Line 5, and it was confirmed that there would be a transfer passage to connect the two stations.

Line 10 station began to be enclosed in June 2019. Construction of the first bored pile began in March 2020, and construction of the enclosure structure began on 21 January 2021. The station completed the "three rights" transfer on 21 April 2025.

On 8 April 2025, the initial name of the stations on Line 10 was announced, and the station was regarded as an interchange station with the existing Wuyangcun Station of Line 5, therefore the name of Wuyangcun station was used. However, due to the slow progress of the construction of the transfer passage, it is unable to be opened with the initial opening of Line 10, and the station needs to implement a virtual transfer via an out-of-station interchange (OSI). On 21 May, part of the Line 5 concourse began to be enclosed to cooperate with the renovation works required for the implementation of the virtual transfer at the station. In the future, when the transfer passage is constructed, it is necessary to renovate Exit A, its attached toilets and re-configure the scope of the paid area of the Line 5 concourse.

On 29 June 2025, the Line 10 station was opened.
