= Wuyang New Town =

Central business district in Guangzhou, China

Coordinates: 23°07′11″N 113°18′28″E

Wuyang New Town (Chinese: 五羊新城) is a place in Guangzhou, Guangdong, China. It is located at the west of Zhujiang New Town (Chinese: 珠江新城) and the north of Ersha Island (Chinese: 二沙岛) in Yuexiu District. It acts as central business district (CBD) among North Tianhe District, Zhujiang New Town and Pazhou (the place where Canton Fair is held).

There is a Guangzhou Metro station in the area called Wuyangcun Station.

== See also ==
- Wuyangcun Station
