= Yangji East station =

Guangzhou Metro Line 10 station

Yangji East 杨箕东
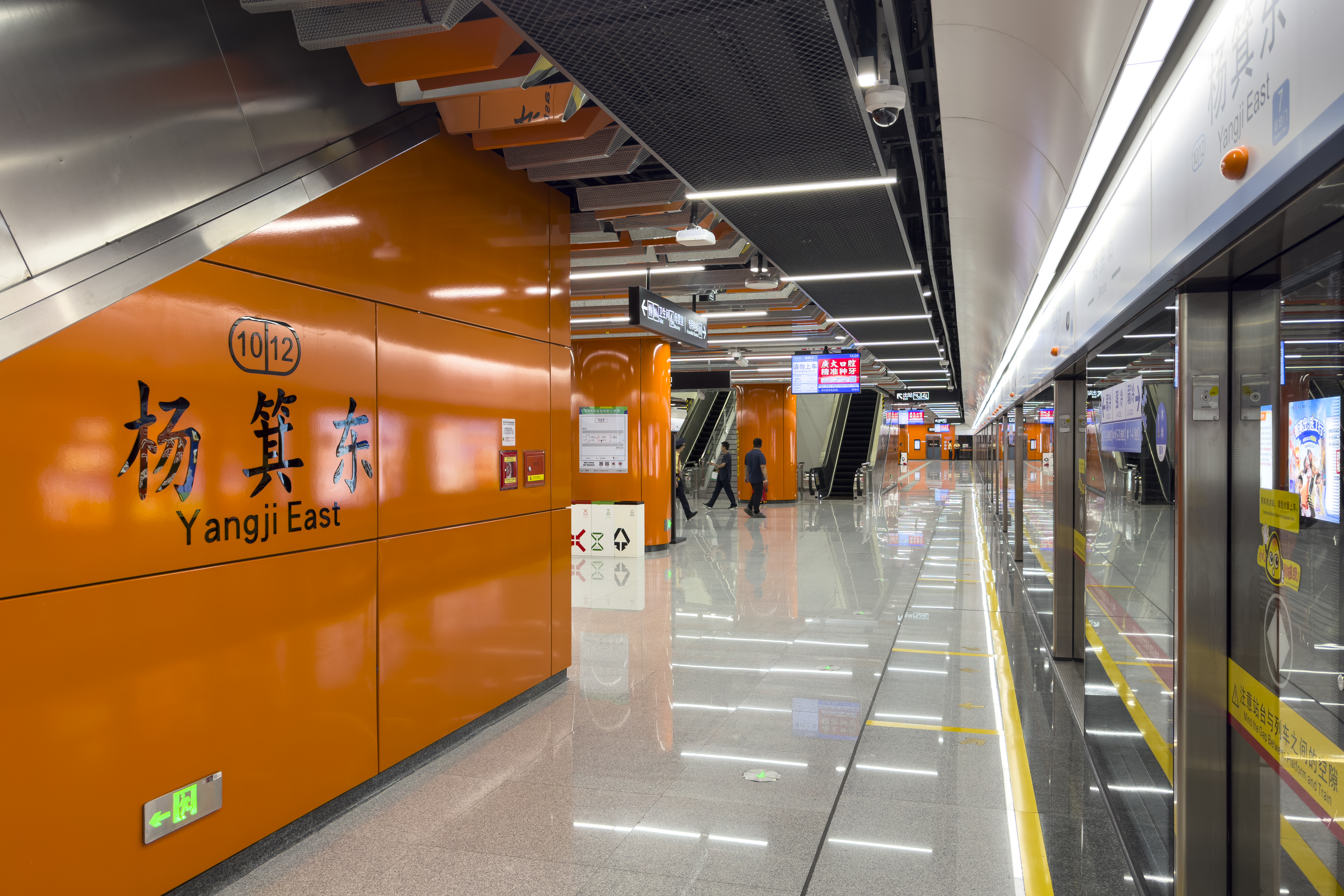
- Platform 1 (termination platform)

Chinese name
- Simplified Chinese: 杨箕东站
- Traditional Chinese: 楊箕東站
Transcriptions
Standard Mandarin
- Hanyu Pinyin: Yángjì Dōng Zhàn
Yue: Cantonese
- Yale Romanization: Yèuhnggēi Dūng Jaahm
- Jyutping: Joeng^{4}gei^{1} Dung^{1} Zaam^{6}
- Hong Kong Romanization: Yeung Kei East station

General information
- Location: Intersection of Guangzhou Avenue (广州大道) and Jinsui Road (金穗路); Xiancun Subdistrict, Tianhe District, Guangzhou, Guangdong; China
- Coordinates: 23°7′37″N 113°18′37″E
- Operator: Guangzhou Metro Co. Ltd.
- Line: Line 10
- Platforms: 2 (1 island platform)
- Tracks: 2

Construction
- Structure type: Underground
- Accessible: Yes

Other information
- Station code: 1012

History
- Opened: 29 June 2025 (13 months ago)
- Former names: Guangzhou Avenue Middle (广州大道中)

Services
Preceding station	Guangzhou Metro	Following station
Wuyangcun towards Xilang	Line 10	Terminus
Future services (Line 3 dismantling section)
Wuyangcun towards Xilang	Line 10	Tianhe Road towards Tianhe Coach Terminal
Location

Yangji East Station (simplified Chinese: 杨箕东站; traditional Chinese: 楊箕東站; Jyutping: joeng^{4} gei^{1} dung^{1} zaam^{6}; Cantonese Yale: Yèuhnggēi Dūng Jaahm) is a station on Line 10 of the Guangzhou Metro, and is also the current northern terminus of the line. It is located at the intersection of Guangzhou Avenue Middle and Jinsui Road in Tianhe District, Guangzhou. The station opened on 29 June 2025.

== Station layout ==
The station has three floors. The ground floor is the exit, and is surrounded by Guangzhou Avenue Middle, Jinsui Road, the headquarters of Southern Daily Newspaper Group and nearby buildings. The first floor is the concourse, the second floor is the station equipment floor, and the third floor are the Line 10 platforms.

The entire station was constructed from north to south using underground excavation, cut-and-cover excavation and semi-covered excavation methods.

G	-	Exits A, B, C1, C2, C3
L1; Concourse	Lobby	Ticket machines, Customer Service, Shops, Police Station, Security Facilities
L2	Mezzanine	Station Equipment
L3; Platforms	Platform 2	10 towards Xilang (Wuyangcun)
L3; Platforms	Island platform, doors will open on the left (Toilets, Nursery)
L3; Platforms	Platform 1	10 termination platform

=== Concourse ===
There are electronic ticket vending machines and an AI customer service center at the concourse. To facilitate access, the west side of the station concourse is divided into a fare-paid area, where elevators, escalators, and stairs are installed to allow passengers to access the platform.

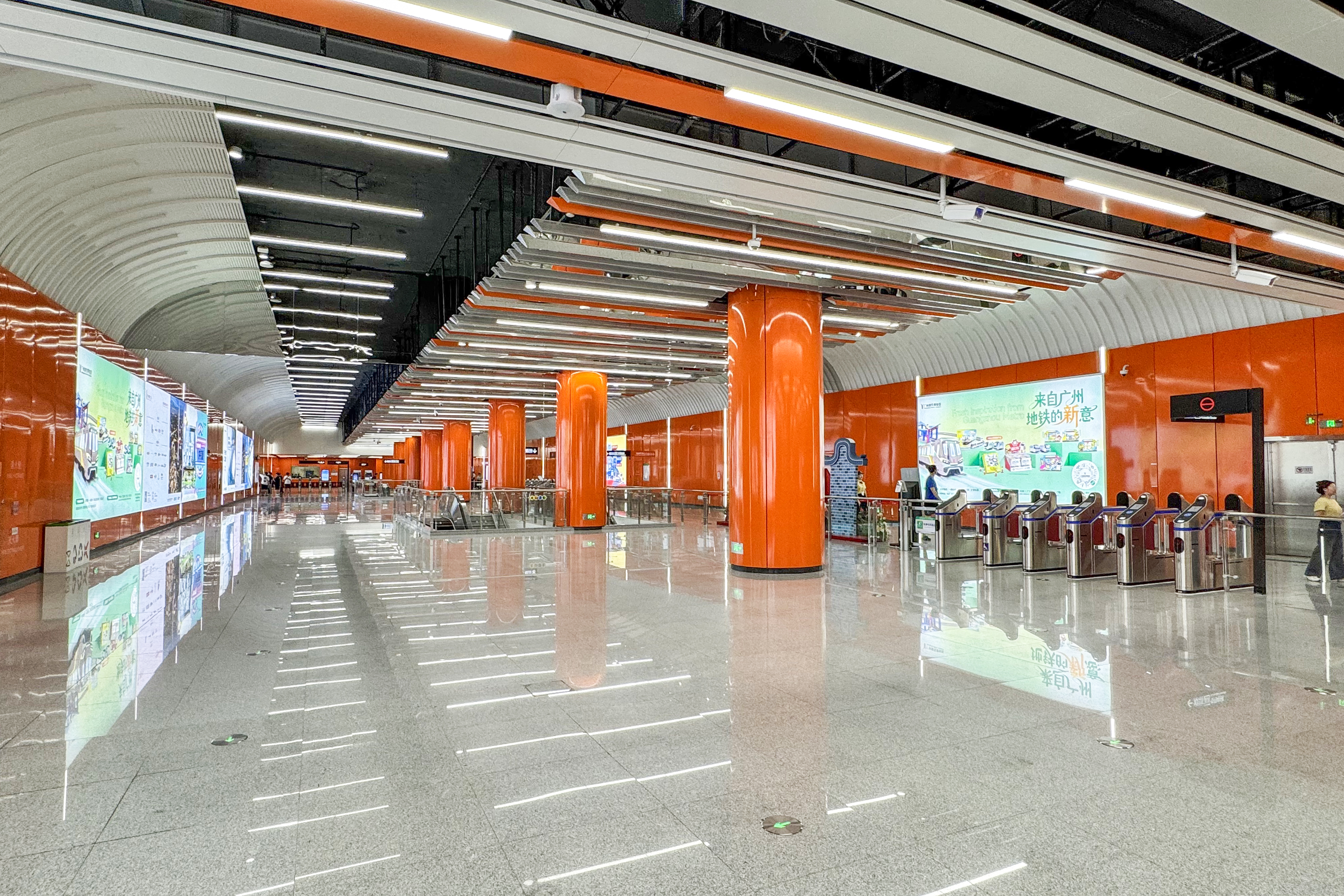
Concourse

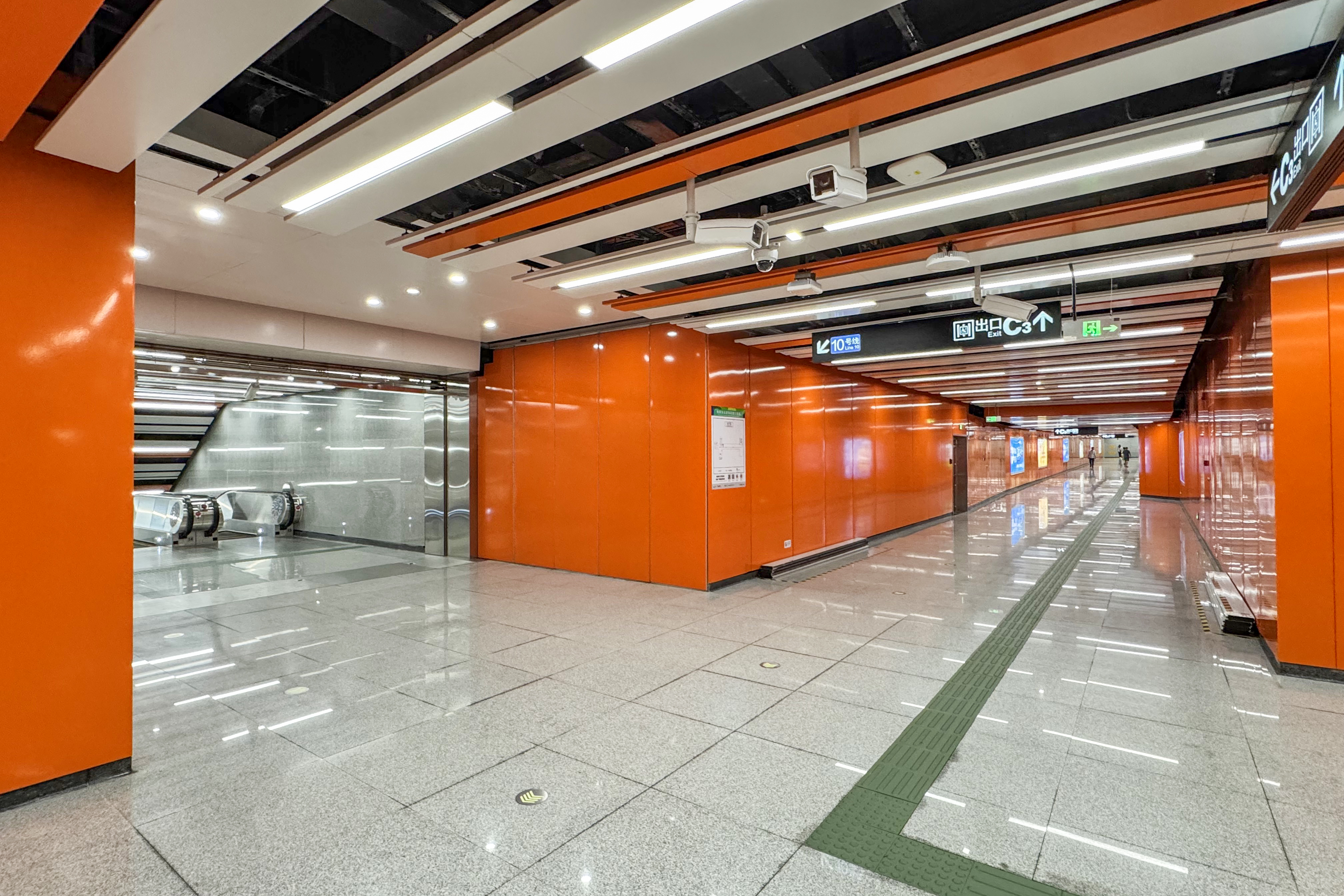
Exit C mezzanine on first basement level

=== Platforms ===
The station has an island platform located underground on the east side of Guangzhou Avenue Middle. Toilets and a nursery room are located at the end of the platform towards Wuyangcun.

In addition, there are three tracks at the north end of the platform for train storage. In addition to a set of double stabling tracks, one of the tracks extends several hundred meters to form a double-length stabling siding. Since this station served as the northern terminus when Line 10 opens, trains on Line 10 use this set of stabling tracks to turn-back beyond the station.

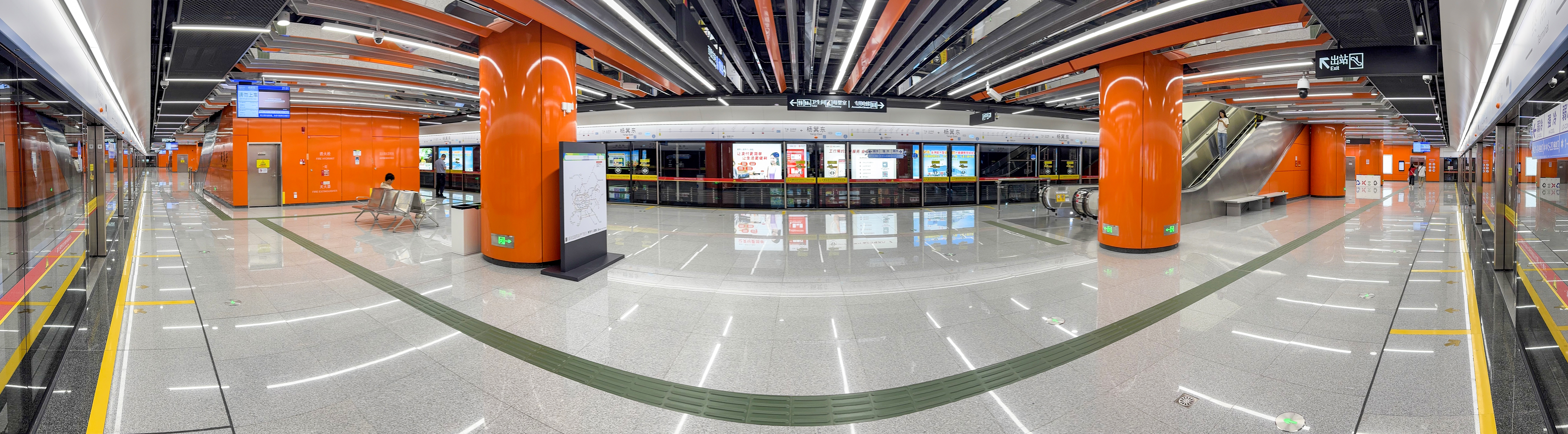
Platform panorama

=== Entrances/exits ===
The station has 5 points of entry/exit. Exits C2 and C3 are equipped with elevators.

- A: Guangzhou Avenue Middle, Guangdong Provincial People's Procuratorate
- B: Guangzhou Avenue Middle, Guangzhou Tianhe Middle School
- C1: Jinsui Road, Women and Children's Medical Center Affiliated to Guangzhou Medical University, Zhongshan Ophthalmic Center of Sun Yat-sen University
- C2: Guangzhou Avenue Middle
- C3: Guangzhou Avenue Middle, Nanfang Media Group (Nanfang Daily)
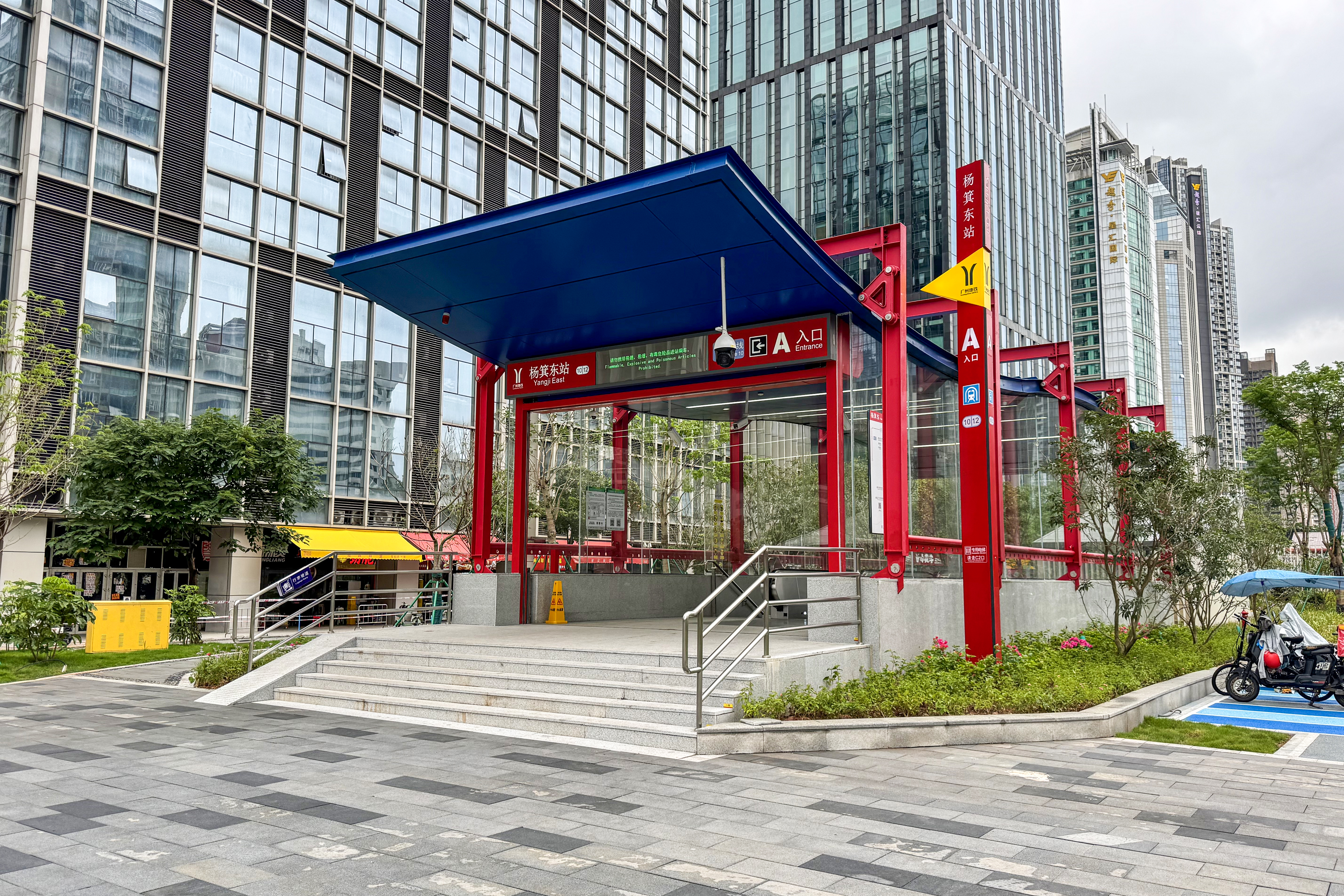
Entrance A

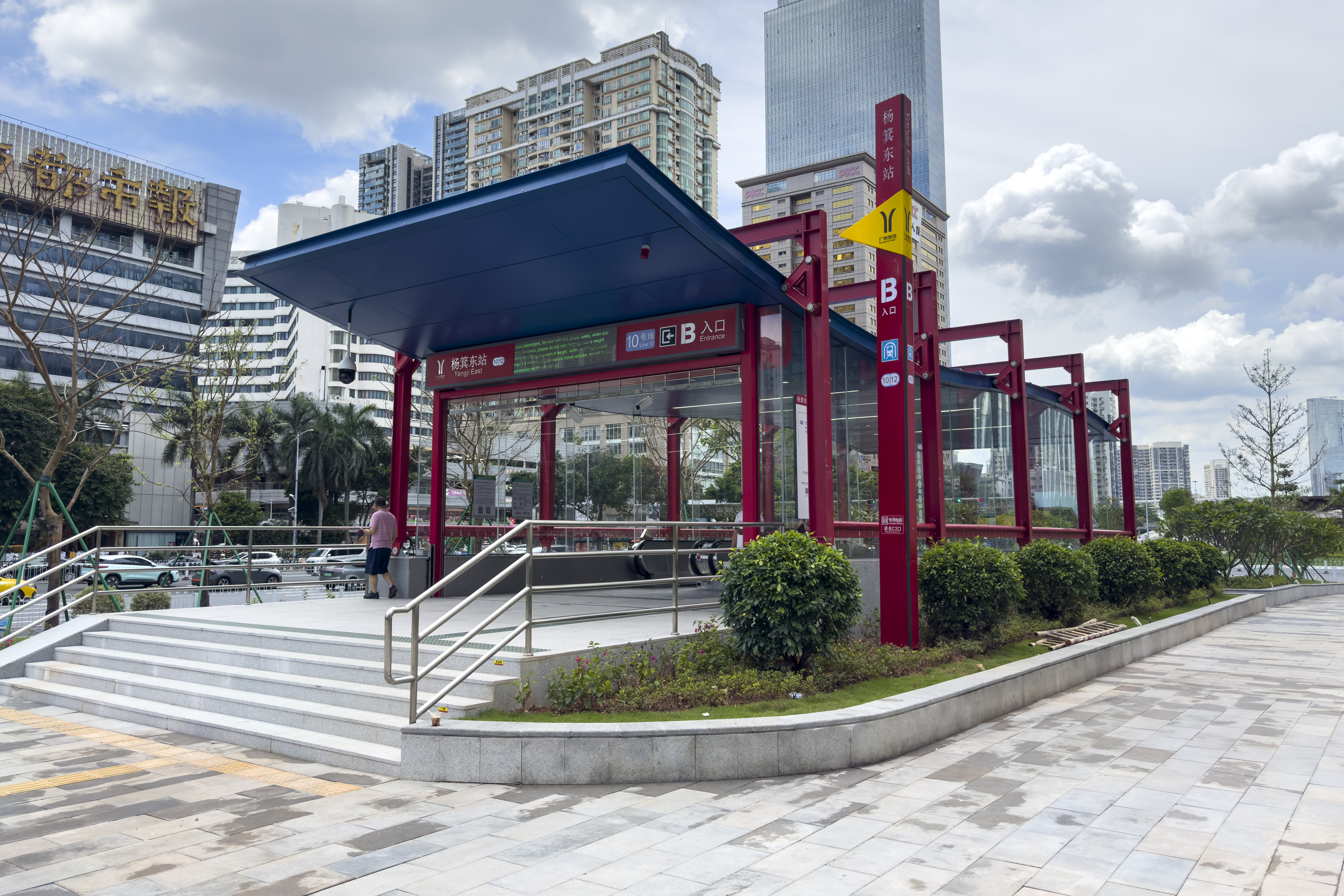
Entrance B

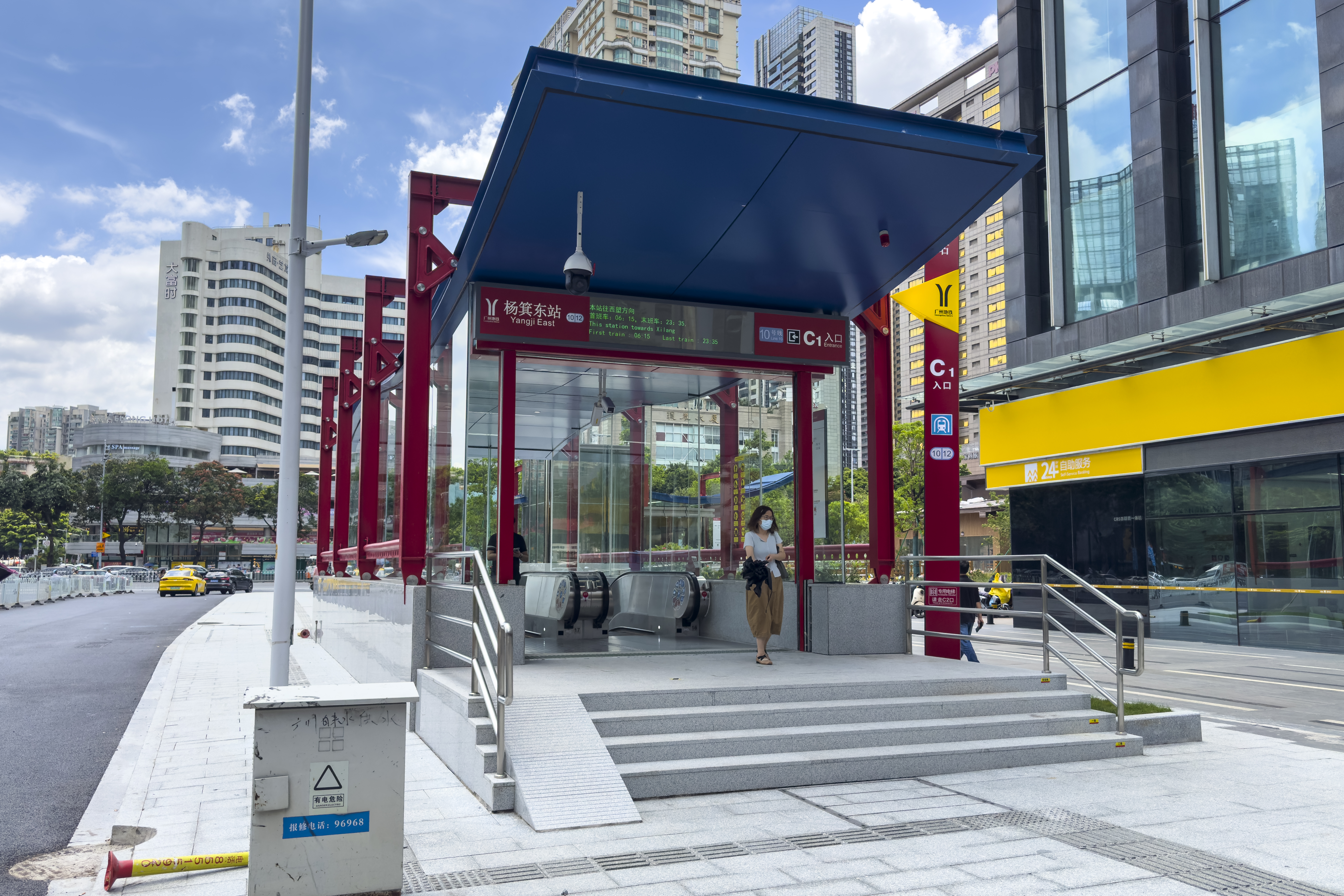
Entrance C1

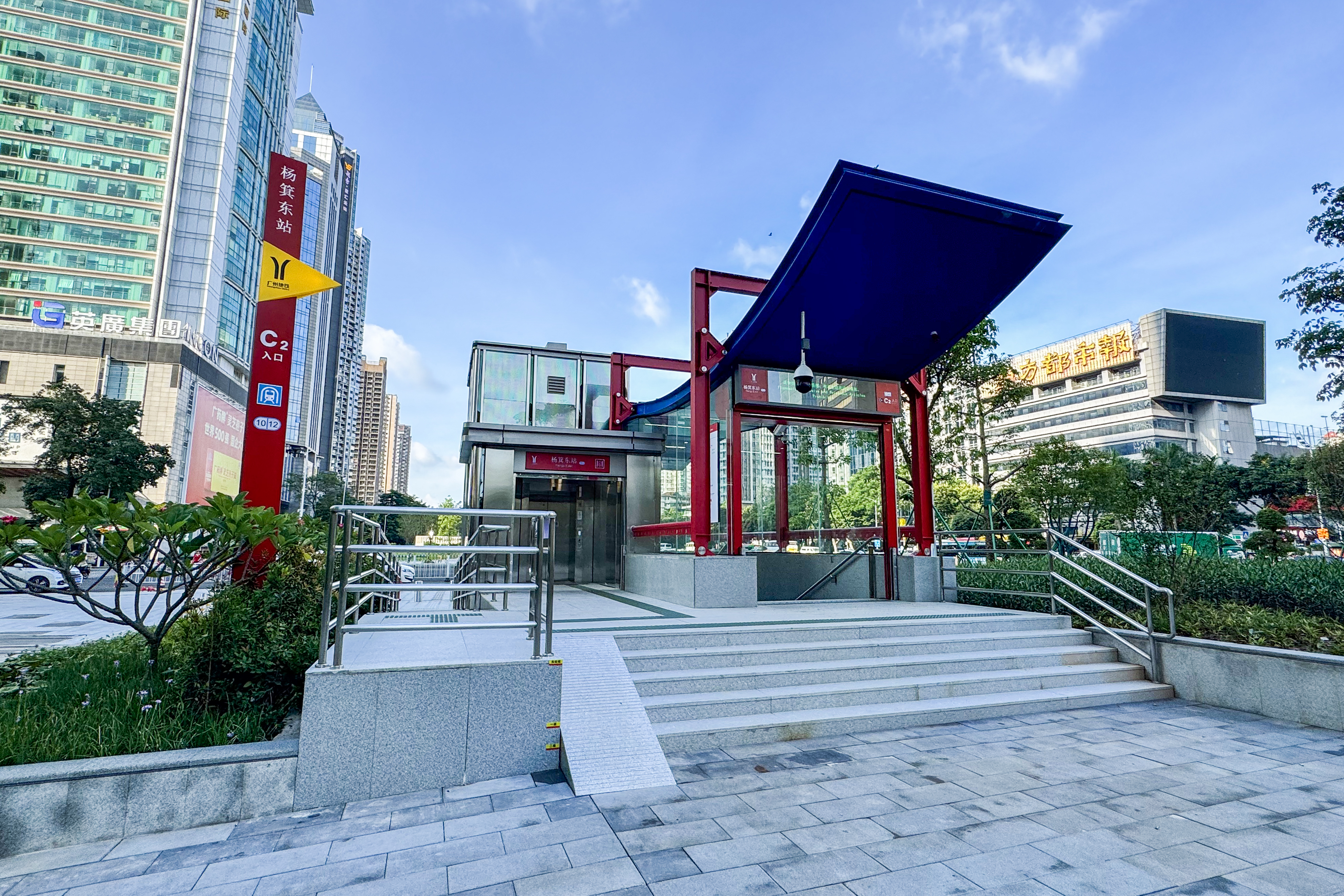
Entrance C2

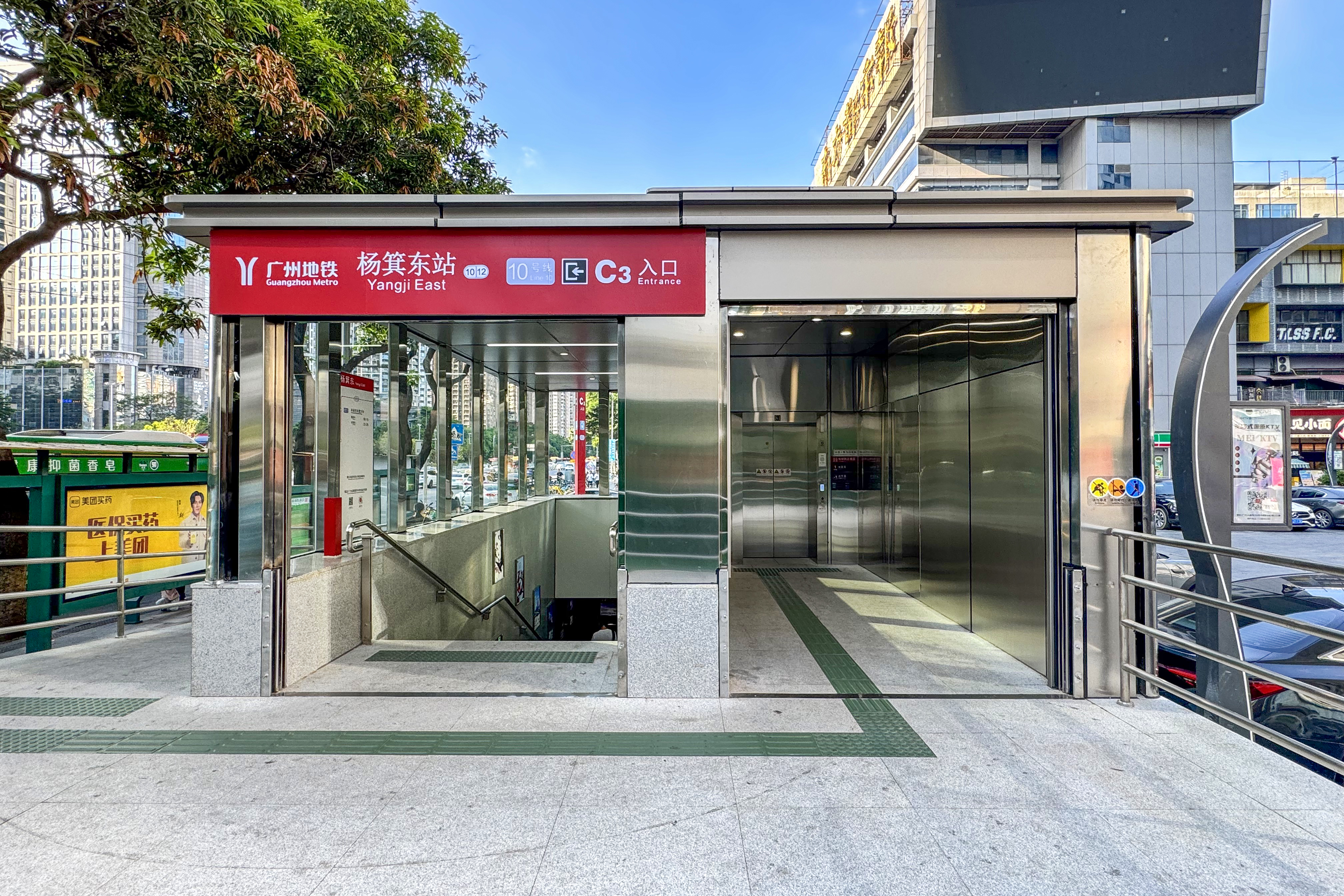
Entrance C3

== History ==
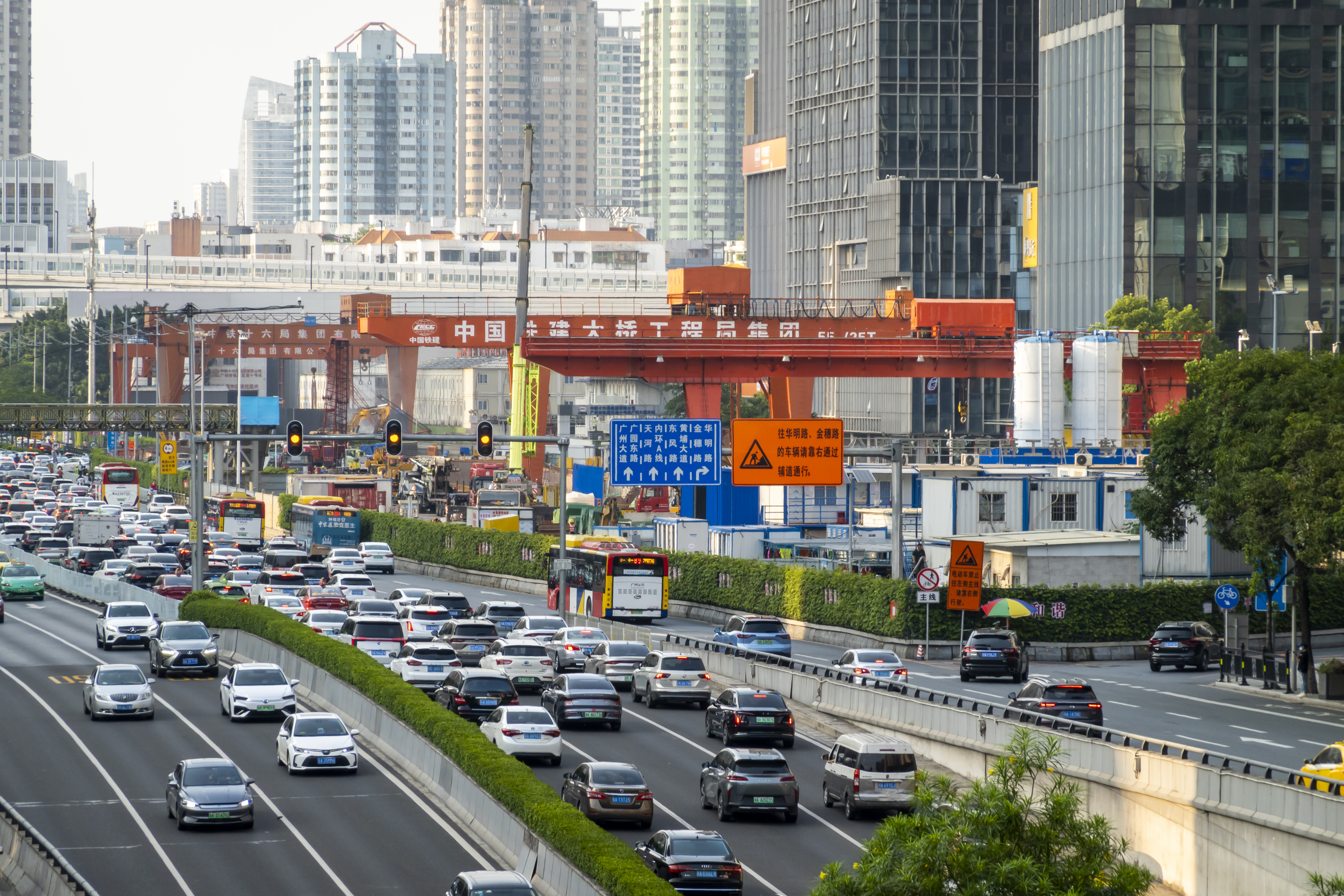
Construction site (May 2023)

During planning and construction, this station was called Guangzhou Avenue Middle station. In April 2025, the Guangzhou Municipal Transportation Bureau announced the preliminary station names for Line 10. This station is planned to continue to use the name, Guangzhou Avenue Middle. Since Guangzhou Avenue Middle is about 5.6 kilometres (3.5 mi) long and the existing Guangzhou Avenue Middle bus station is more than 3 kilometres (1.9 mi) away from the metro station, this name has sparked discussions. Finally, in the following month, the authorities named this station Yangji East station, since it is located in the Yangji East Community of Xiancun Subdistrict and to the east of the Yangji Community of Meihuacun Subdistrict.

The underground excavation of the station was completed on 22 April 2021. The main structure of the station finished construction on 20 December 2023, and the station completed the "three rights" transfer on 13 March 2025. On 29 June 2025, the station opened.

== Future development ==
In the future, this station will become an interchange station with Line 26, which will be placed in parallel with Line 10. The concourse of Line 10 has reserved a transfer tunnel with Line 26.
