= Gongye Avenue South station =

Guangzhou Metro Line 10 station

Gongye Avenue South 工业大道南
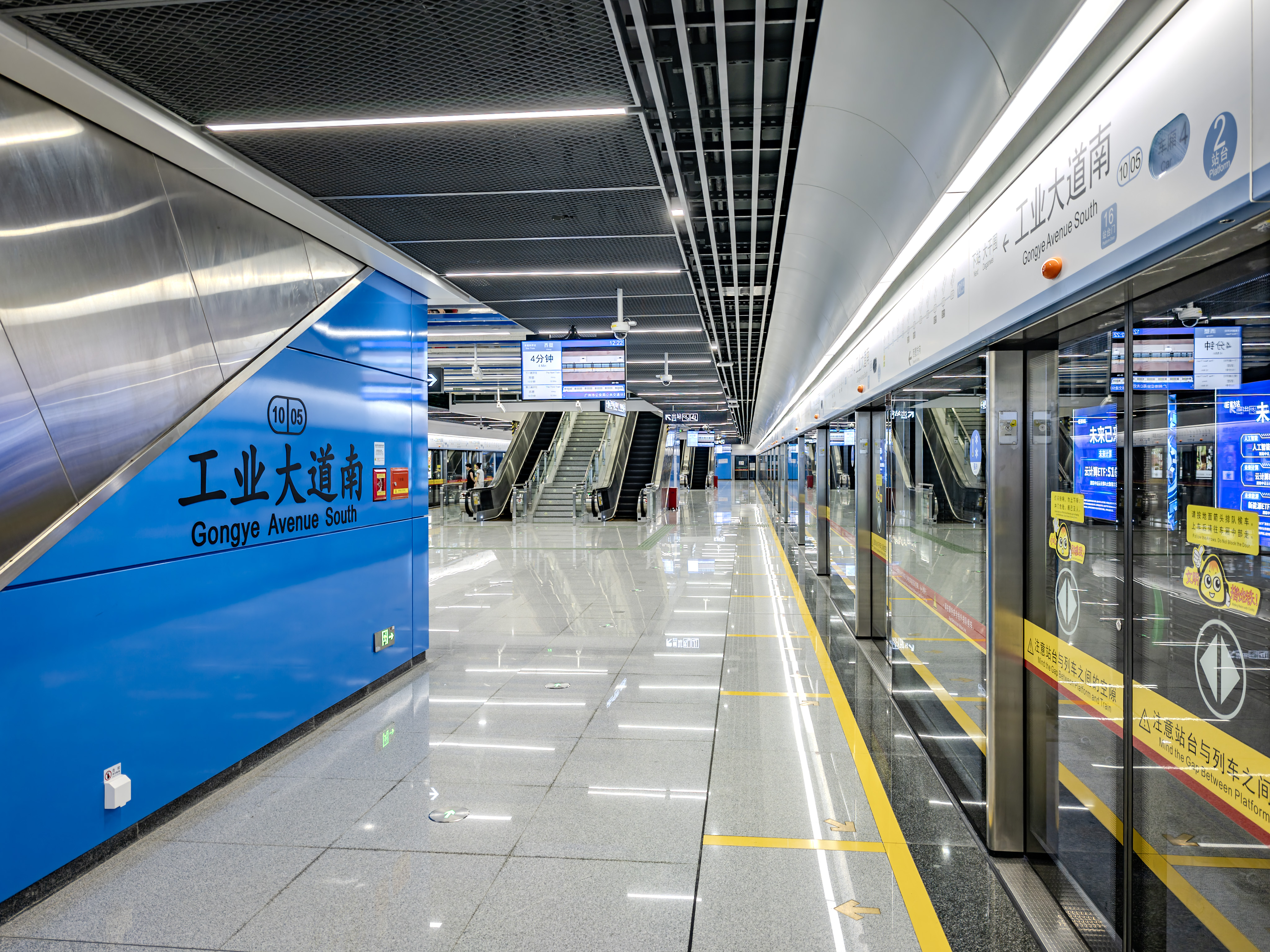
- Platform

Chinese name
- Simplified Chinese: 工业大道南站
- Traditional Chinese: 工業大道南站
Transcriptions
Standard Mandarin
- Hanyu Pinyin: Gōngyè Dàdào Nán Zhàn
Yue: Cantonese
- Yale Romanization: Gūngyihp Daaihdouh Nàahm Jaahm
- Jyutping: Gung^{1}jip^{6} Daai^{6}dou^{6} Naam^{4} Zaam^{6}
- Hong Kong Romanization: Industrial Avenue South station

General information
- Location: North of the intersection of Gongye Avenue and Jinpeng Road (金鹏路); Ruibao Subdistrict, Haizhu District, Guangzhou, Guangdong; China
- Coordinates: 23°4′12.49″N 113°16′58.55″E
- Operator: Guangzhou Metro Co. Ltd.
- Line: Line 10
- Platforms: 2 (1 island platform)
- Tracks: 2

Construction
- Structure type: Underground
- Accessible: Yes

Other information
- Station code: 1005

History
- Opened: 29 June 2025 (13 months ago)

Services
Preceding station	Guangzhou Metro	Following station
Daganwei towards Xilang	Line 10	Dongxiao South towards Yangji East
Location

Gongye Avenue South station (simplified Chinese: 工业大道南站; traditional Chinese: 工業大道南站; Jyutping: gung^{1} jip^{6} daai^{6} dou^{6} naam^{4} zaam^{6}; Cantonese Yale: Gūngyihp Daaihdouh Nàahm Jaahm) is a station on Line 10 of the Guangzhou Metro. It is located underground north of the intersection of Gongye Avenue and Jinpeng Road, southeast of Jinbi Garden (金碧花园) in Guangzhou's Haizhu District. It opened on 29 June 2025.

The station is located about 200 meters away from Shixi station on the Guangfo line, but the two stations are not official interchange stations. Interchange between these stations will be treated as two separate journeys requiring two fares.

== Station layout ==
This station is a four-storey underground station. The ground level is the exit, and it is surrounded by Gongye Avenue South, Jinpeng Road, Jinbi Garden and other nearby buildings. The first floor is the concourse, the second and third floors are the station equipment levels, and the fourth floor is the platform for Line 10.

G	-	Exits A, B, C
L1; Concourse	Lobby	Ticket Machines, Customer Service, Shops, Police Station, Security Facilities; Reserved area for future transfer passage towards Guangfo line Shixi station
L2	Mezzanine	Station Equipment
L3	Mezzanine	Station Equipment
L4; Platforms	Platform 2	10 towards Xilang (Daganwei)
L4; Platforms	Island platform, doors will open on the left (Toilets, Nursery)
L4; Platforms	Platform 1	10 towards Yangji East (Dongxiao South)

=== Concourse ===
There are automatic ticket machines and an AI customer service center at the concourse. There are elevators, escalators, and stairs in the fare-paid area for passengers to reach the platform.

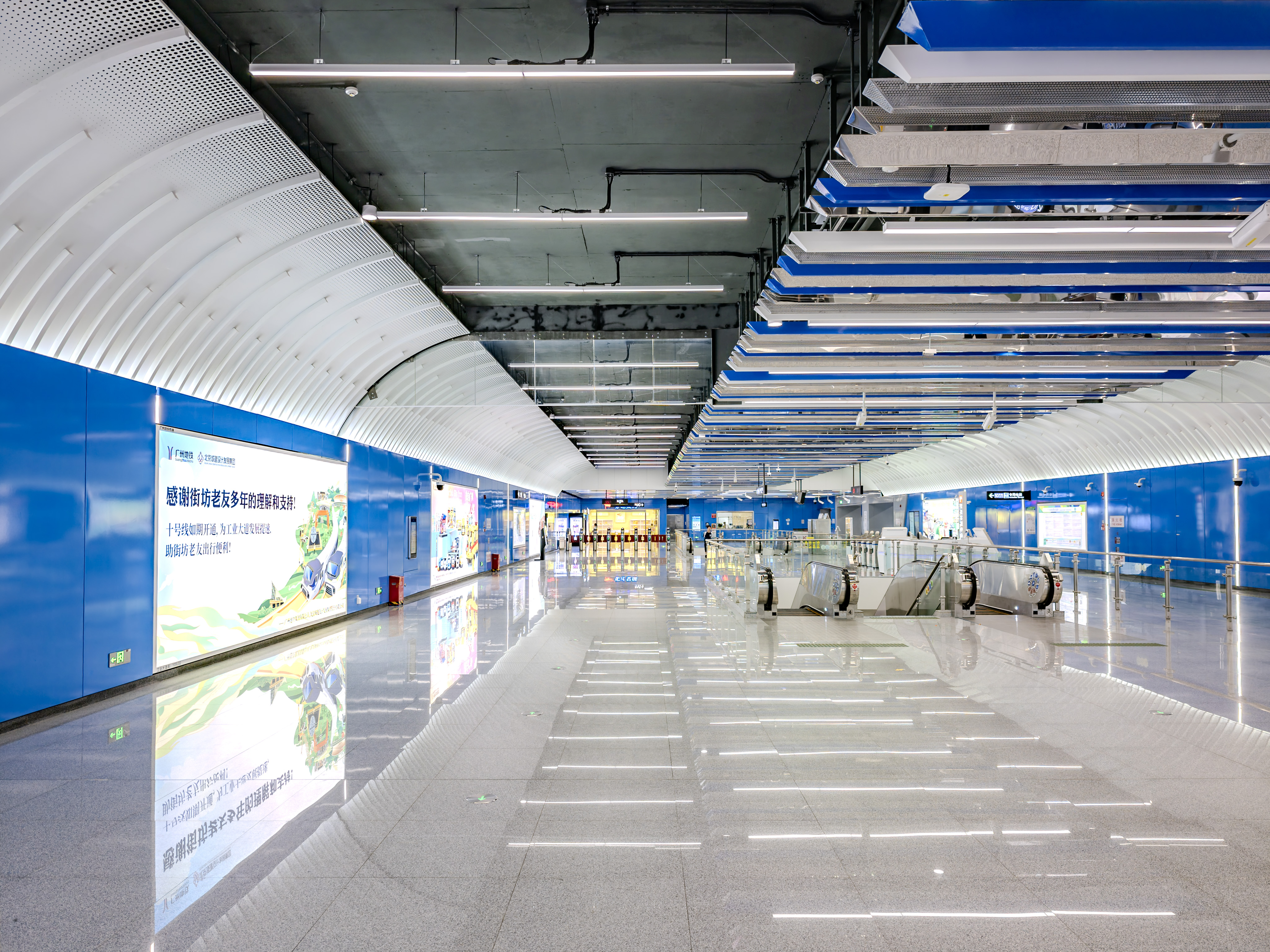
Concourse

=== Platform ===
The station has an island platform located under Jinpeng Road. Toilets and a nursery room are located at the end of the platform towards Dongxiao South station.

=== Entrances/exits ===
The station has 3 points of entry/exit. Exits A and C opened with the station's initial opening. Exit B opened on 29 December 2025.

- A: Gongye Avenue South
- B: Gongye Avenue South
- C: Gongye Avenue South

Exit A is equipped with an elevator.

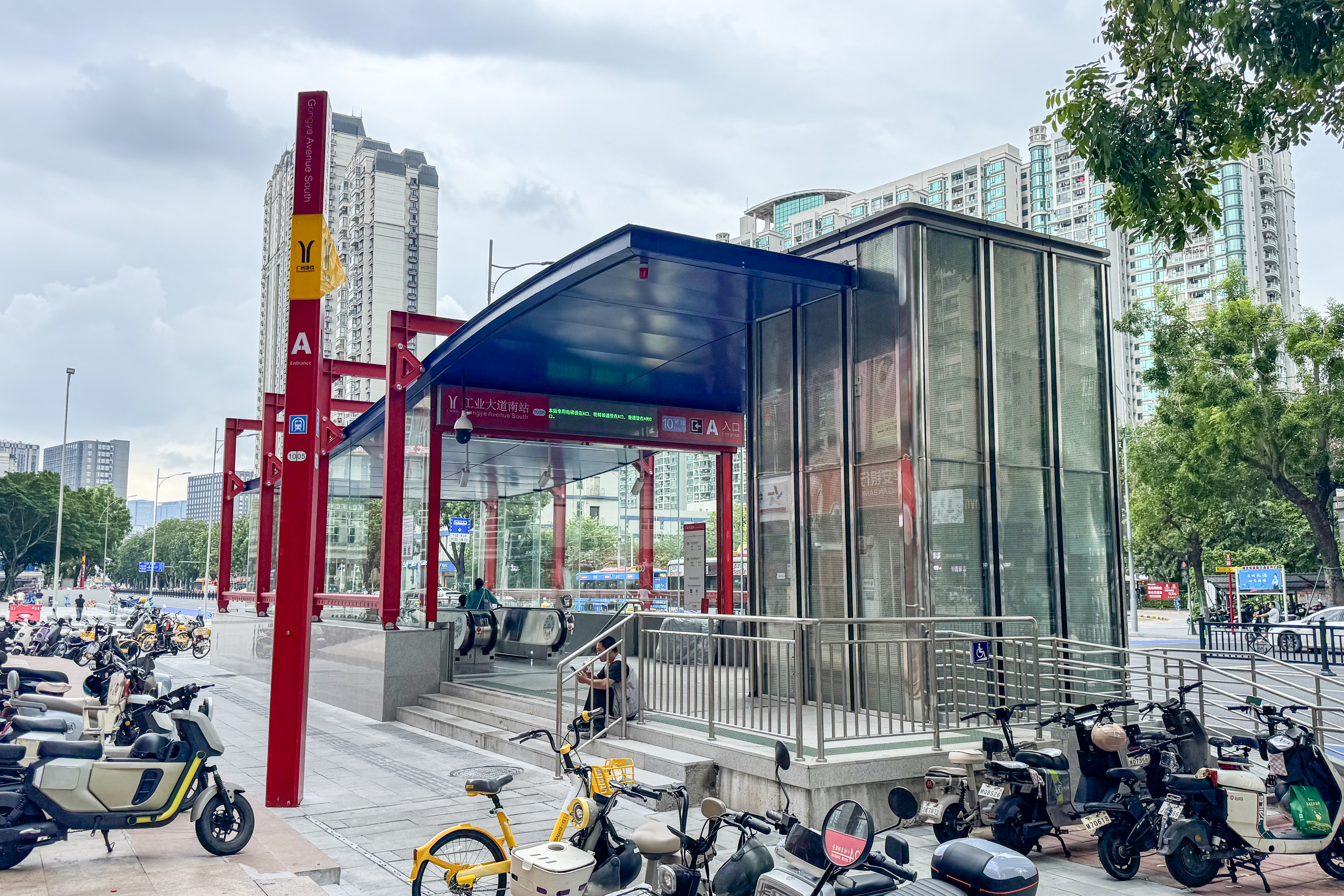
Entrance A

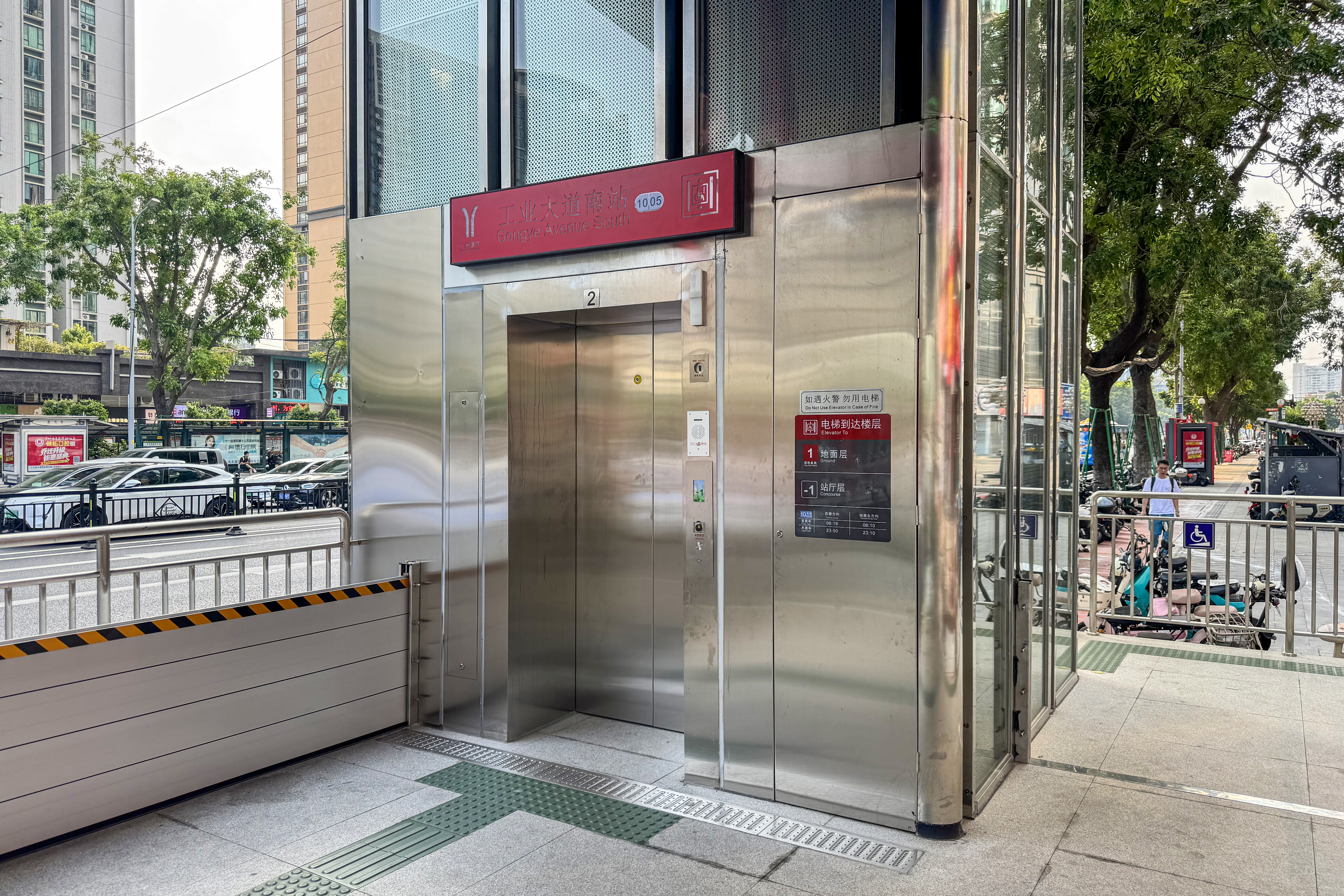
Elevator of Entrance A

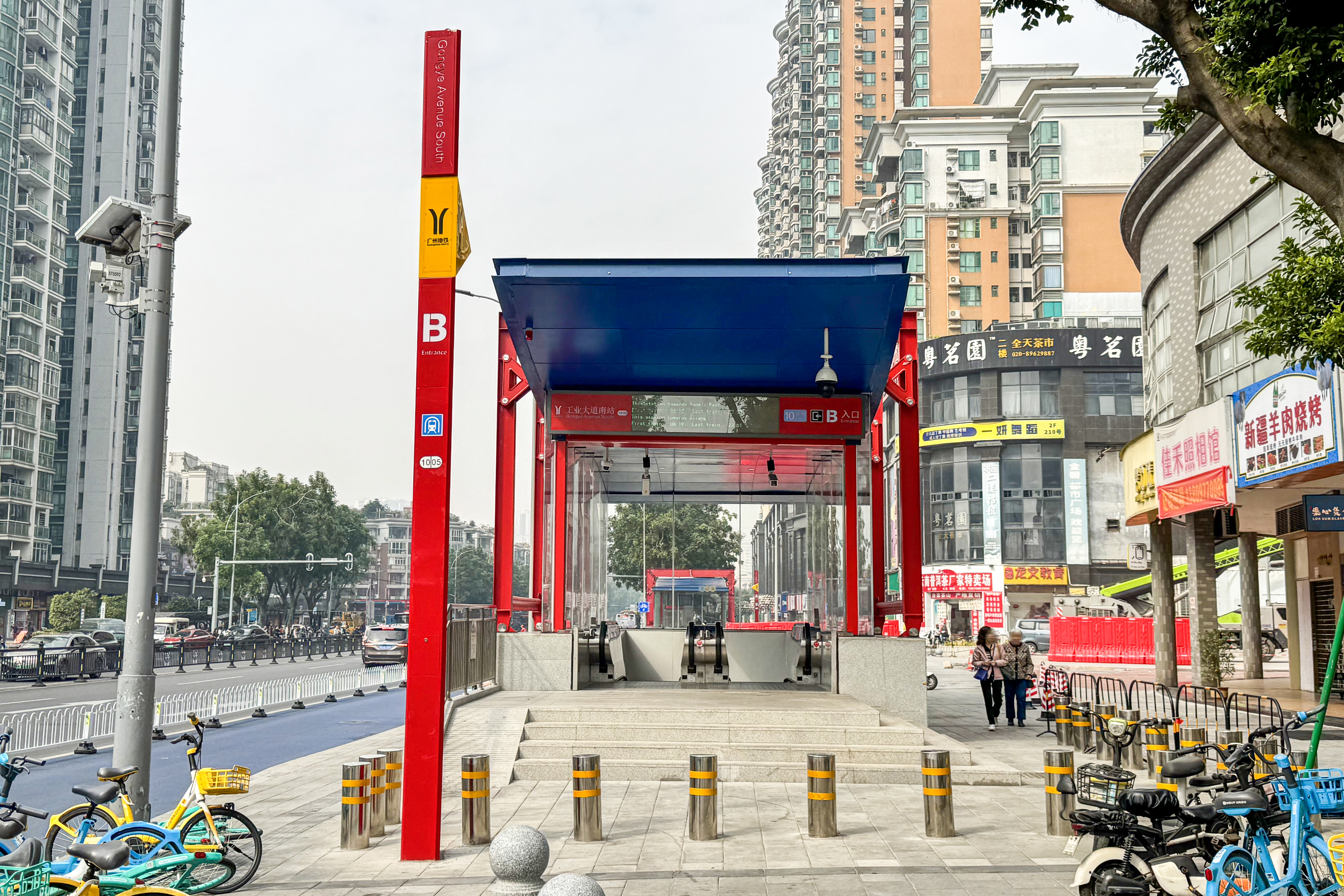
Entrance B

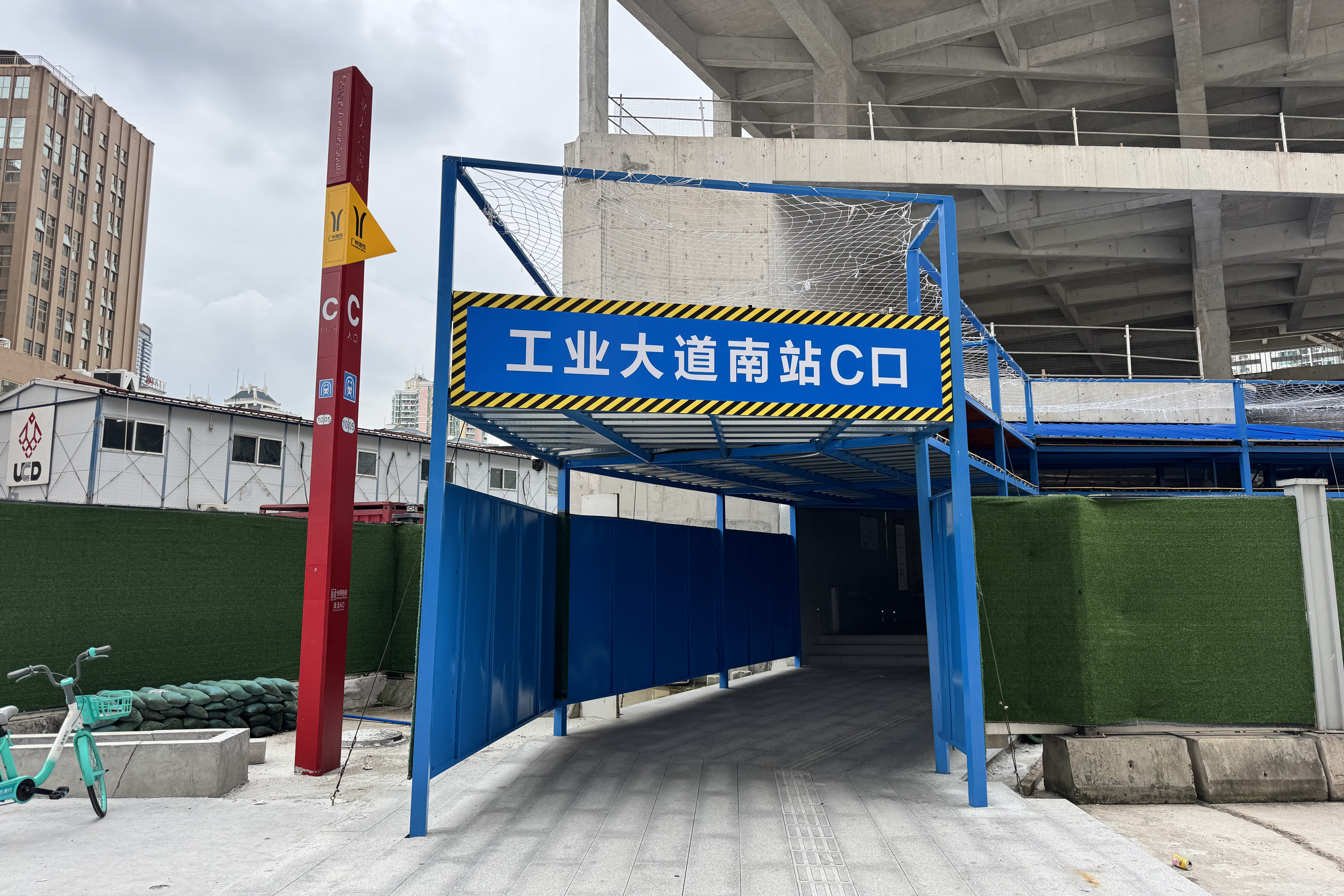
Temporary Entrance C

== History ==
When the feasibility study of Line 10 was carried out, it was planned to have a transfer with Shixi station on the Guangfo line, so the name of the project followed the use of Shixi station. Here, the station of Line 10 extends a transfer passage about 200m long on the southwest side, connecting with the planned Exit C on the northeast side of the Guangfo line station. In 2018, during the preliminary design stage of the station, the layout of the entrances/exits was adjusted, and the transfer passage was changed to a long passage for the entrance, which was not connected to the nearby Guangfo line station. According to the station designer, the distance between the two lines is relatively long, there are many surrounding constraints, and it is expected that the passenger flow of the two lines will be small, so the transfer passage will be cancelled. A non-paid transfer would be realized via surface level in the near term, and the conditions for future access to the Guangfo line station will be reserved. Subsequently, the name of the station project was changed to Gongye Avenue station. In addition, Line 24 was planned to stop here, which would have made this station into a three-line interchange station. However, the planning of the Haizhu section of the line was changed in the later stage and no longer passes through this station.

Construction of the station began in May 2020, the station site was enclosed in January 2021, and the station roof slab was sealed in April 2022. On 31 March 2025, the station completed the "three rights" transfer.

On 8 April 2025, the Guangzhou Municipal Transportation Bureau announced the preliminary station names for Line 10, and the station is planned to be named Gongye Avenue South station, without using the name of the existing Shixi station on Guangfo line and thus was not identified as an interchange station. Due to the wide area that Gongye Avenue South covers, many people think that the station name is not good. Finally, in the following month, the authorities did not accept the proposal to change the name on the grounds that the naming instructions were unclear, and the station name was kept as Gongye Avenue South station.

The station opened on 29 June 2025.
