= Dongxiao South station =

Guangzhou Metro Line 2 and Line 10 station

Dongxiao South 东晓南
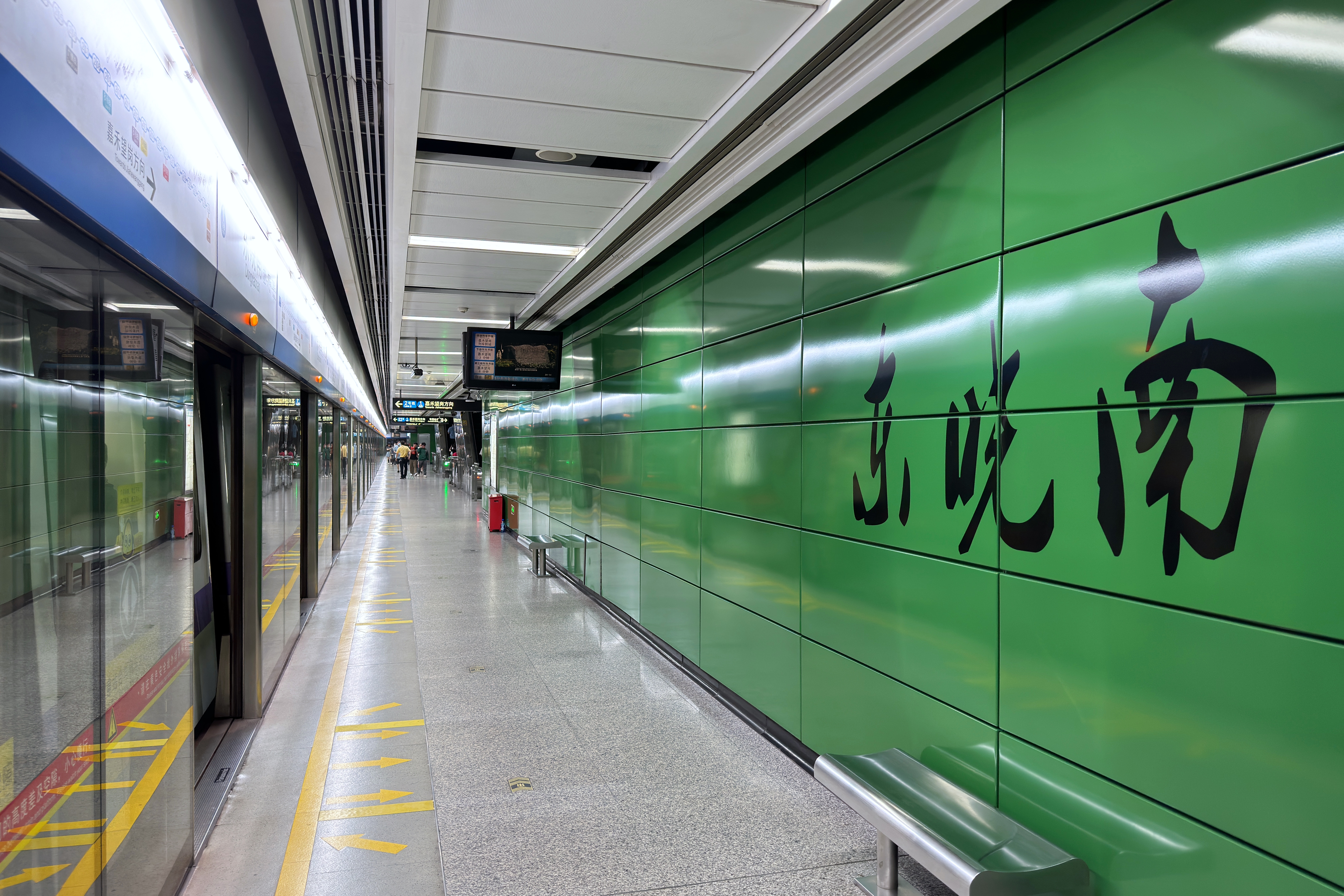
- Line 2 platform

Chinese name
- Simplified Chinese: 东晓南站
- Traditional Chinese: 東曉南站
Transcriptions
Standard Mandarin
- Hanyu Pinyin: Dōngxiǎonán Zhàn
Yue: Cantonese
- Yale Romanization: Dūnghíu Nàahm Jaahm
- Jyutping: Dung^{1}hiu^{2} Naam^{4} Zaam^{6}
- Hong Kong Romanization: Tung Hiu South station

General information
- Location: Intersection of Dongxiao Road South (东晓南路), Nanzhou Road North (南洲北路) and Qiaogang Road (侨港路); Ruibao Subdistrict, Haizhu District, Guangzhou, Guangdong; China
- Coordinates: 23°04′16″N 113°17′40″E
- Operator: Guangzhou Metro Co. Ltd.
- Lines: Line 2; Line 10
- Platforms: 4 (2 side platforms and 1 island platform)
- Tracks: 4

Construction
- Structure type: Underground
- Accessible: Yes

Other information
- Station code: 207 1006

History
- Opened: Line 2: 25 September 2010 (15 years ago); Line 10: 29 June 2025 (13 months ago)
- Former names: Dongxiaonan (previous name until 29 June 2025)

Services
Preceding station	Guangzhou Metro	Following station
Nanzhou towards Guangzhou South Railway Station	Line 2	Jiangtai Road towards Jiahewanggang
Gongye Avenue South towards Xilang	Line 10	Wufeng towards Yangji East
Location

Dongxiao South Station (simplified Chinese: 东晓南站; traditional Chinese: 東曉南站; Jyutping: dung^{1} hiu^{2} naam^{4} zaam^{6}; Cantonese Yale: Dūnghíu Nàahm Jaahm), formerly Dongxiao Nanlu Station (东晓南路站; 東曉南路站; dung1 hiu2 naam4 lou6 zaam6; 'Dongxiao Road South Station') while in planning, is an interchange station between Line 2 and Line 10 of the Guangzhou Metro. The underground station is located at the junction of Dongxiao Road South (东晓南路) and Qiaogang Road (侨港路) in Guangzhou's Haizhu District.

== Station layout ==
The station is divided into two sections: Line 2 under the east side of Dongxiao Road South, and Line 10 under Qiaogang Road. The station is surrounded by Dongxiao Road South Road, Nanzhou Road North, Qiaogang Road, Neihuan Road Viaduct and other nearby buildings.

=== Line 2 ===
The Line 2 station is a two-storey underground station. The ground level is the exit, the first floor is the concourse, and the second floor is the platform for Line 2.

G	-	Exits A and B
L1; Concourse	Lobby	Ticket Machines, Customer Service, Shops, Police Station, Security Facilities; Transfer passage towards Line 10
L2; Platforms	Side platform, doors will open on the right
L2; Platforms	Platform 2	2 towards Guangzhou South Railway Station (Nanzhou)
L2; Platforms	Side platform, doors will open on the left
L2; Platforms	Platform 1	2 towards Jiahewanggang (Jiangtai Road)

=== Line 10 ===
The Line 10 station is a three-storey underground station. The ground level is the exit, the first floor is the concourse, the second floor is the equipment level, and the third floor is the platform for Line 10.

G	-	Exits D, E1, E2
L1; Concourse	Lobby	Ticket Machines, Customer Service, Shops, Police Station, Security Facilities; Transfer passage towards Line 2
L2	Mezzanine	Station Equipment
L3; Platforms	Platform 4	10 towards Xilang (Gongye Avenue South)
L3; Platforms	Island platform, doors will open on the left (Toilets, Nursery)
L3; Platforms	Platform 3	10 towards Yangji East (Wufeng)

=== Concourse ===
The concourse is divided into two parts, Line 2 and Line 10, both of which are located on the first floor. At present, the two concourses are used as an interchange passage in the paid area between the two lines through the passage of the original Exit C of Line 2, and there is a new paid area transfer passage to the south of the current passage, but that passage is still under construction, so the two concourses are not connected to each other in the non-paid area. Due to the height difference between the two lines, the existing interchange passage is connected by stairs and chair lifts for people with disabilities.

There are elevators, escalators, and stairs in the respective fare-paid areas within both lines for passengers to reach the platforms.

There are automatic ticket machines and AI customer service centers at the concourses of both lines. The Line 2 station has a 7-Eleven convenience store, Zhou Heiya and other shops, and there are also self-service card vending/recharge machines and other facilities in the station. There is an automated external defibrillator next to the control center of each concourse.

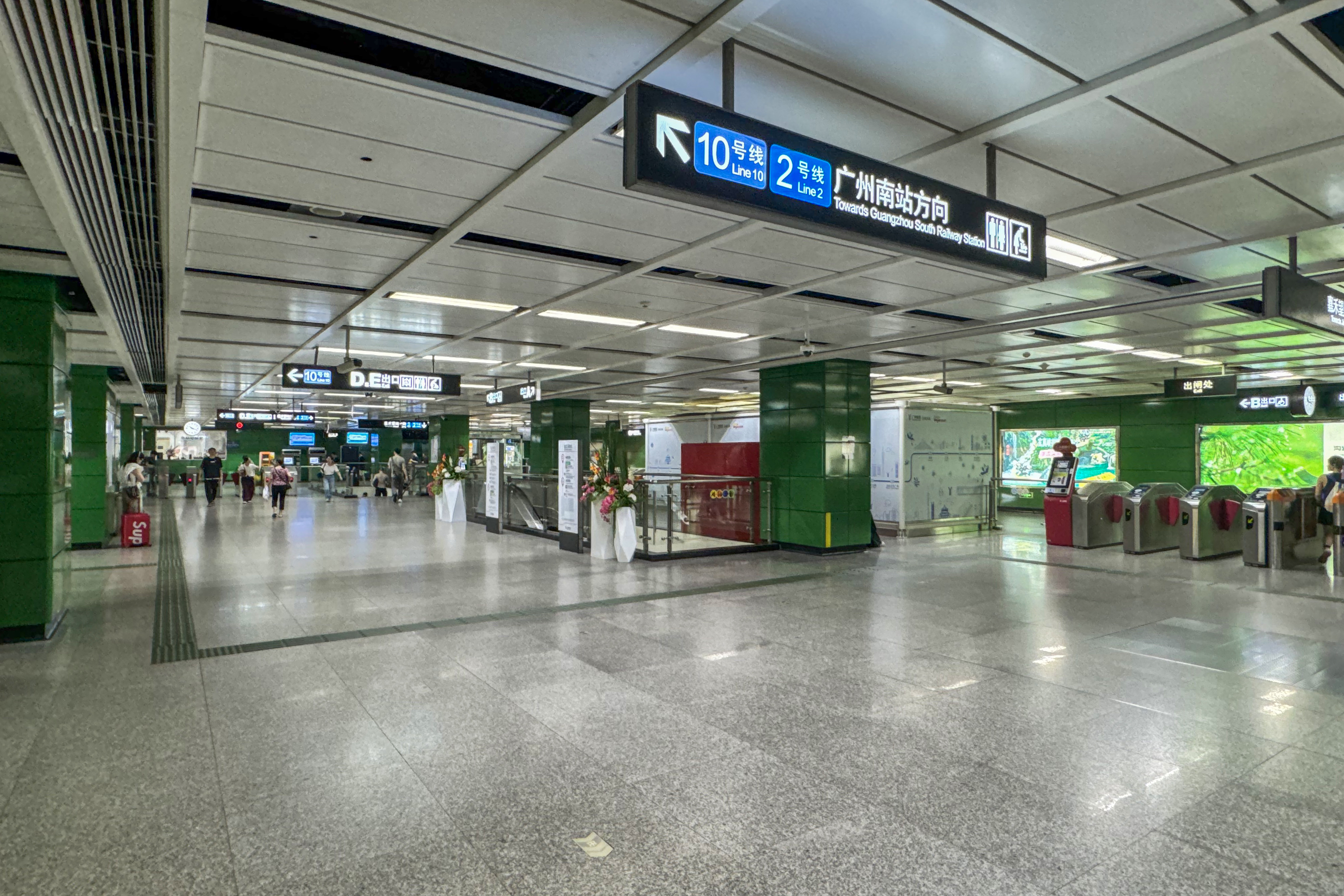
Line 2 concourse

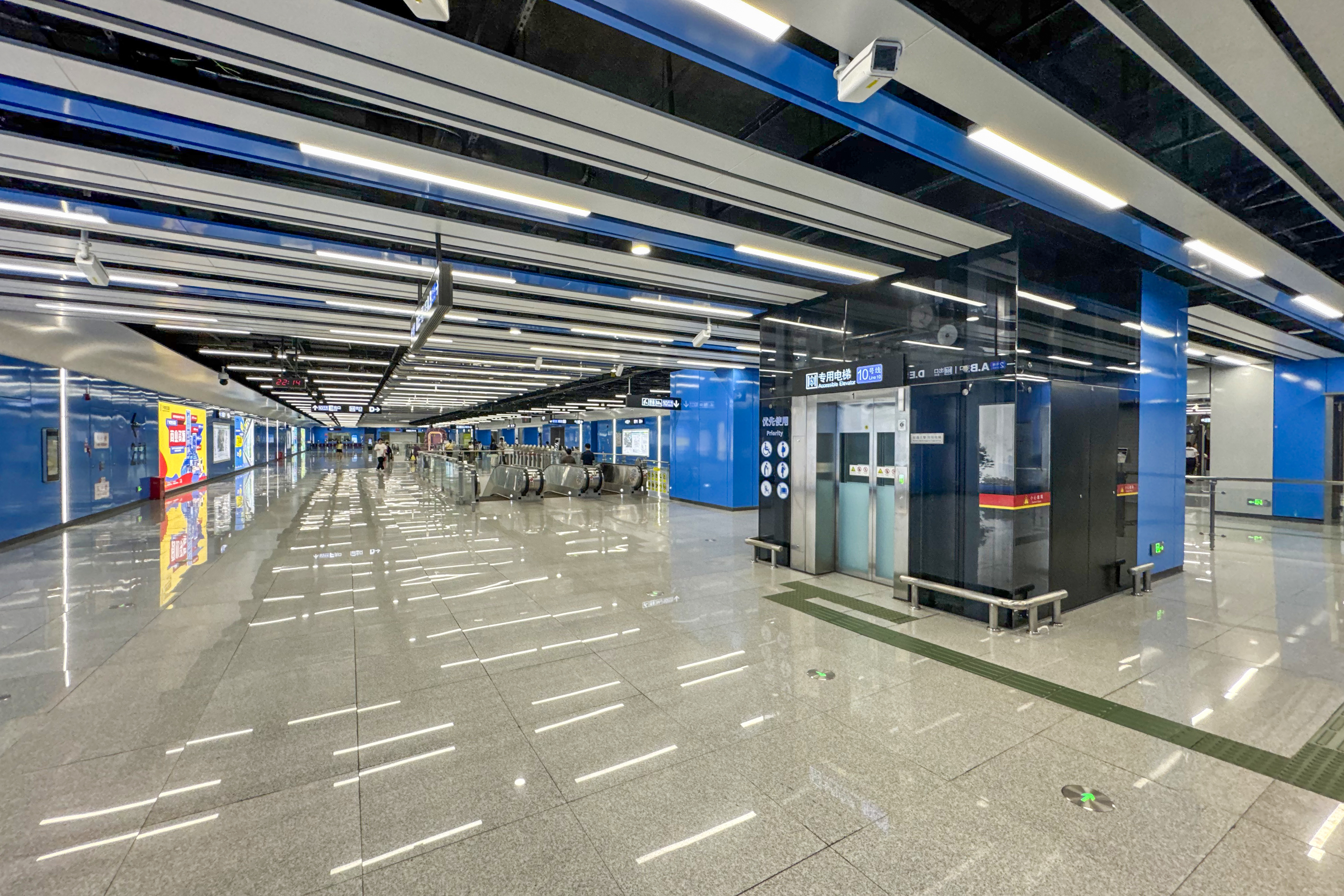
Line 10 concourse

=== Platforms ===
The Line 2 station has two side platforms, both located on the east side of the track and on the same floor, which is located under the east side of Dongxiao Road South. Line 10 has an island platform located under Qiaogang Road. Line 2 is on the upper level and Line 10 is on the lower level.

Due to the constraints of the inner ring viaduct piers and the foundations of the surrounding residences, Line 2 was forced to be placed under Dongxiao Road South on the east side of the viaduct and could not be equipped with separate island-style platforms on both sides of the viaduct like Fenghuang Xincun station and other stations located under similar bridges. At the same time, due to the limitation of the distance between the lines, it is not possible to install island platforms with a width of at least 8 meters that meet the national standard, so the design of spaced side platforms is adopted.

In addition, toilets and a nursery room are located at the end of the Line 10 platform towards Wufeng.

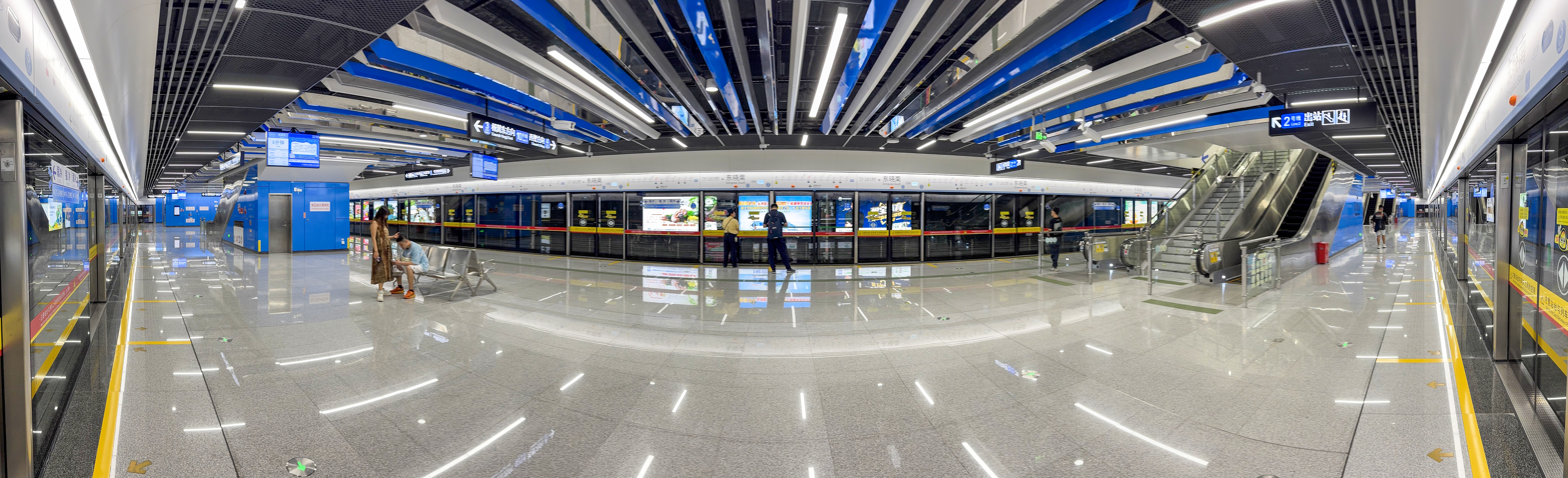
Line 10 platform panorama

=== Entrances/exits ===
The station has 5 points of entry/exit. When the station was first opened, there were two entrances/exits, C1 and C2, but they were closed and dismantled in 2020 to accommodate the construction of the Line 10 station. After the opening of the Line 10 station, three entrances/exits, lettered D, E1 and E2, were added at the northwest corner of the intersection of Qiaogang Road and Dongxiao Road South, of which Exit D was built from the original Exit C1. In addition, the additional Exit C of Line 10 is located at the original Exit C2, which is still under construction. Exit E2 is located next to Exit E1 and opened on 6 November 2025.

- A: Dongxiao South Road, The Canton Hospital South Campus
- B: Dongxiao South Road
- D: Dongxiao South Road
- E1: Qiaogang Road
- E2: Qiaogang Road

Exit B is equipped with a stairlift, and Exit D is equipped with an elevator.

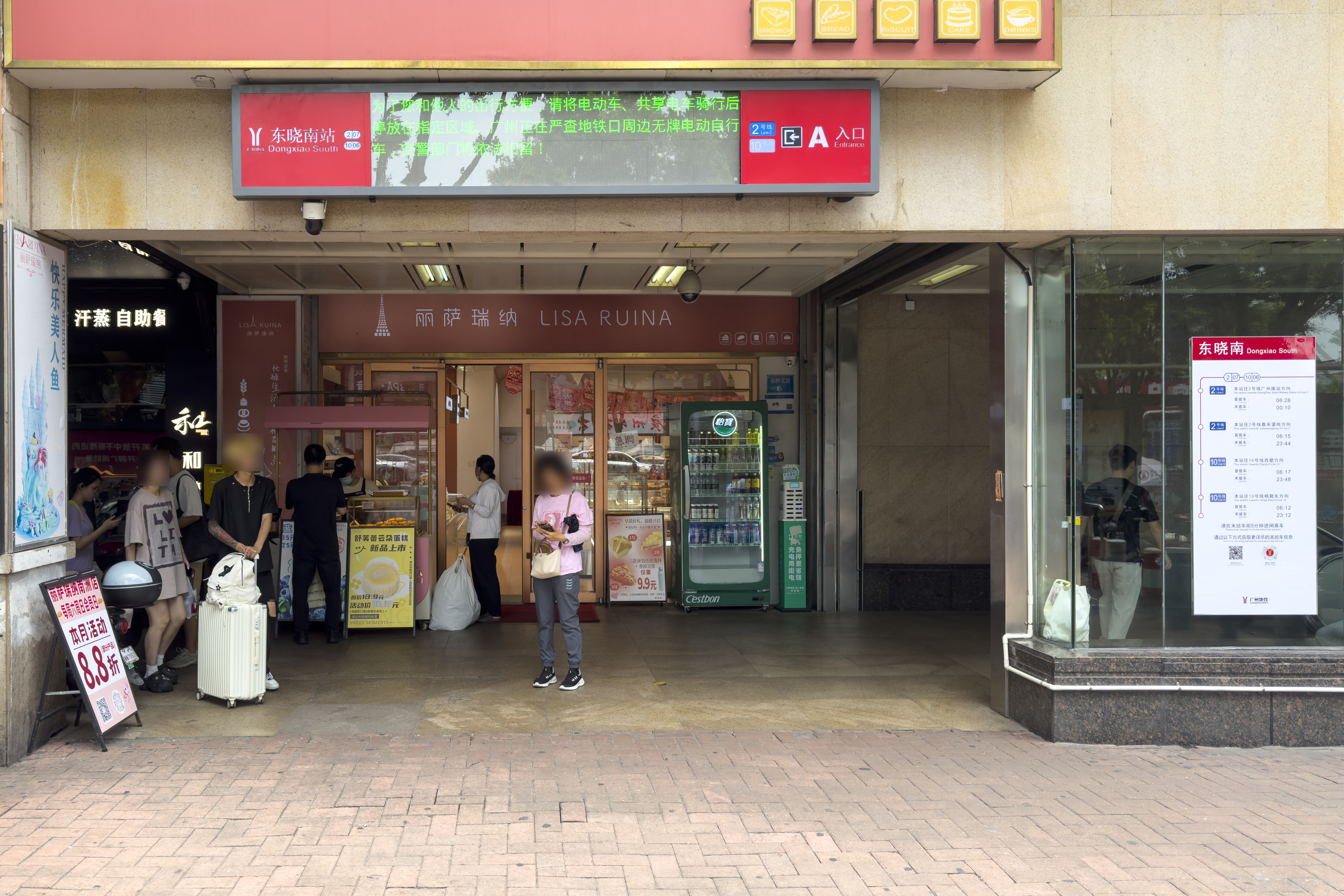
Entrance A

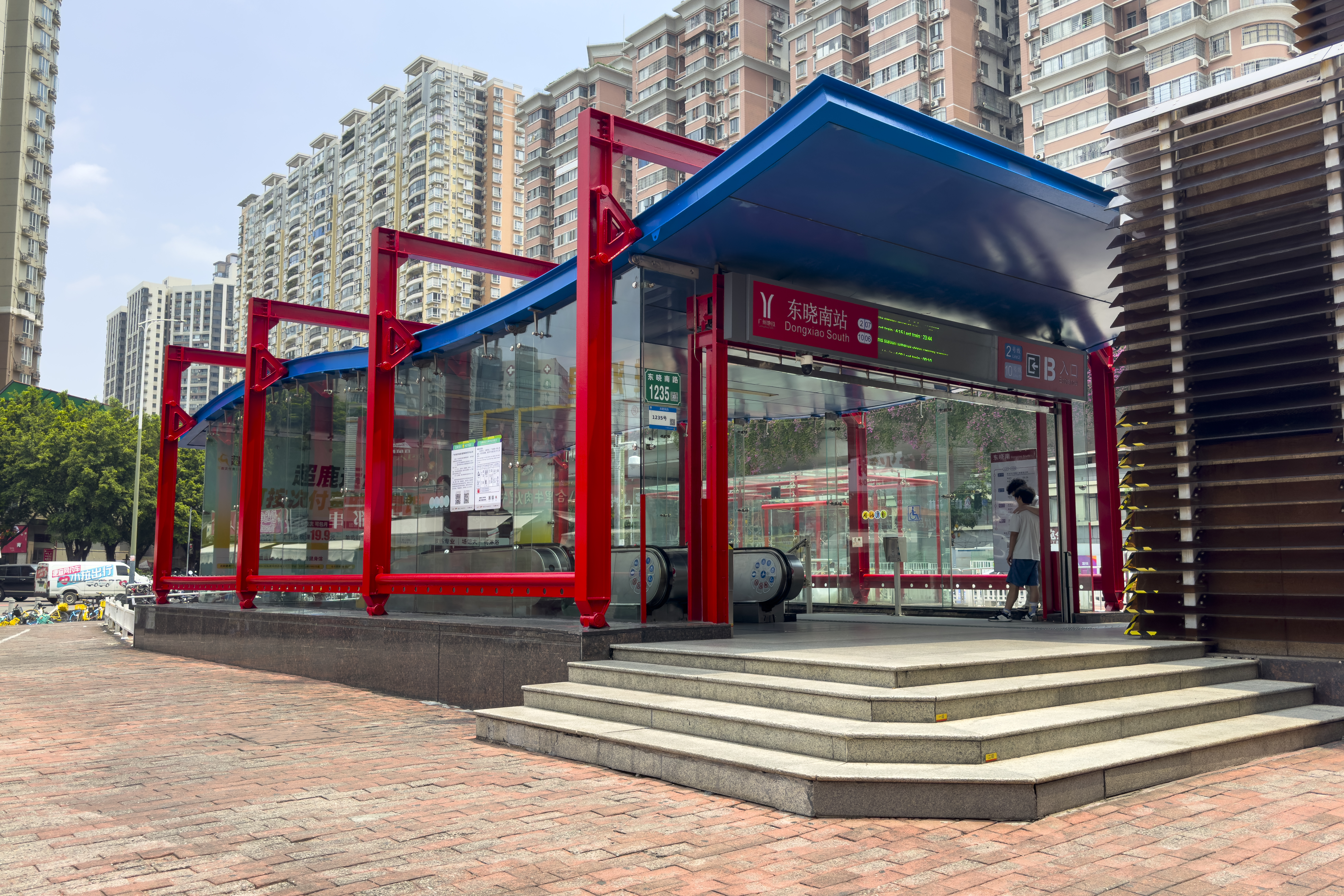
Entrance B

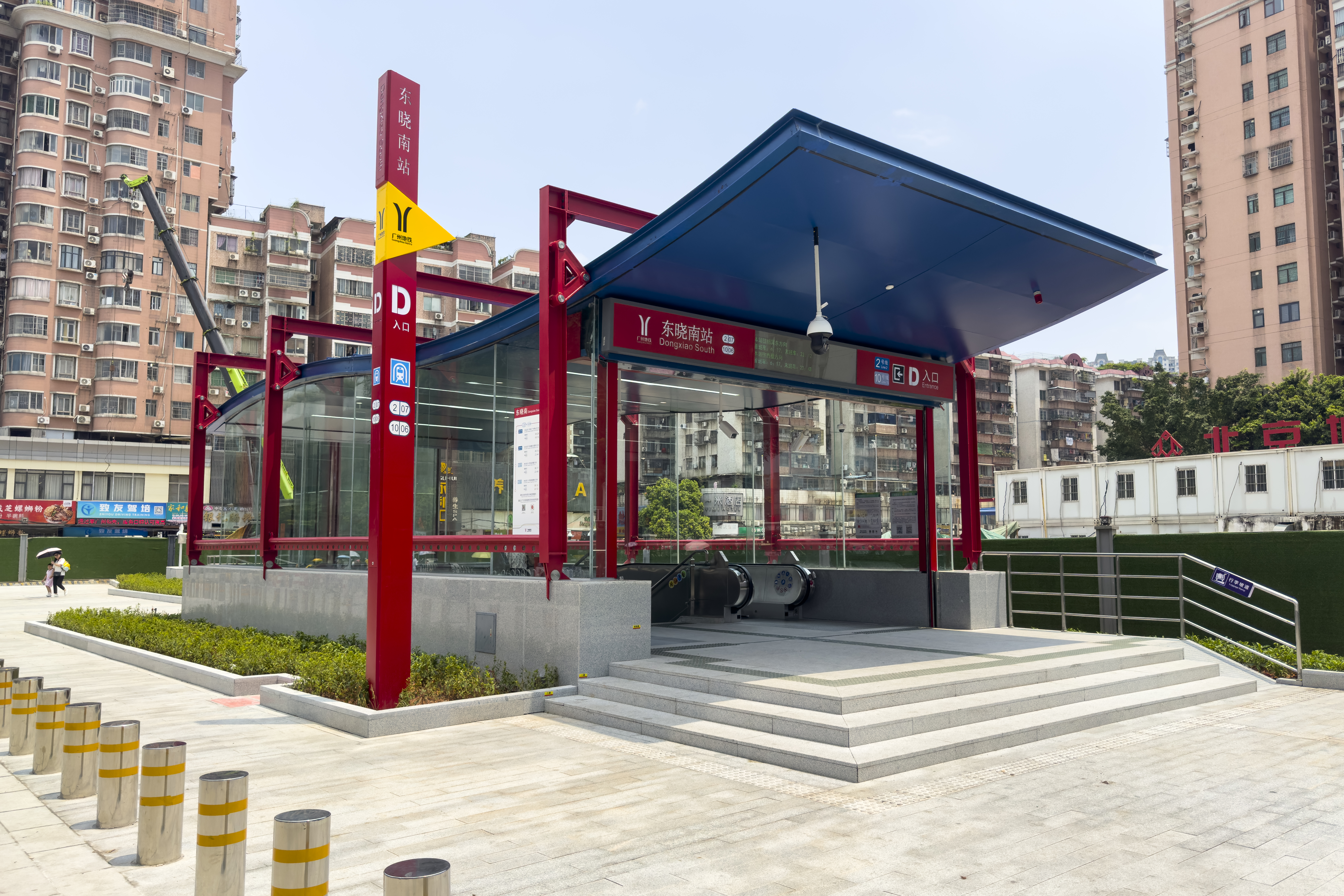
Entrance D

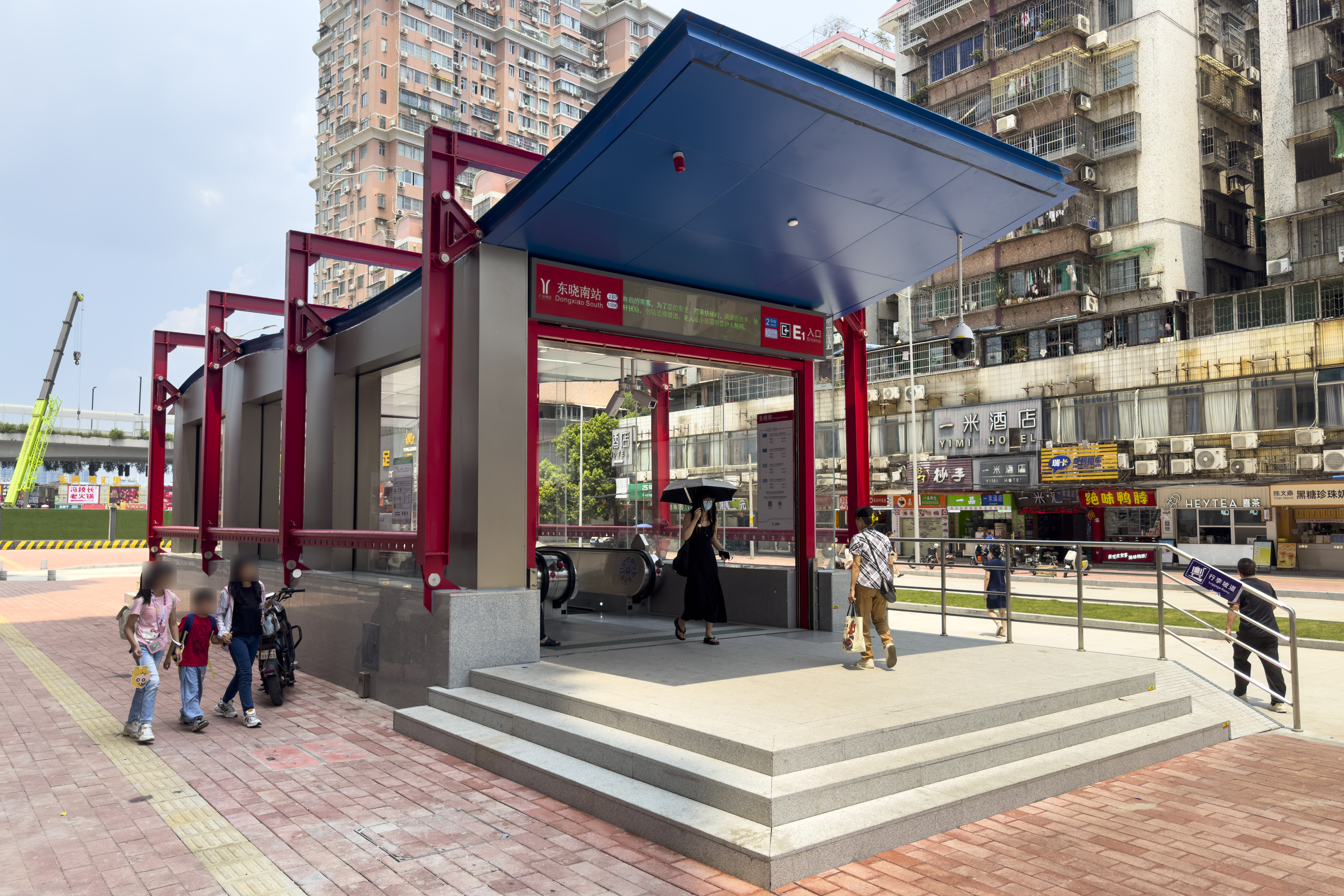
Entrance E1

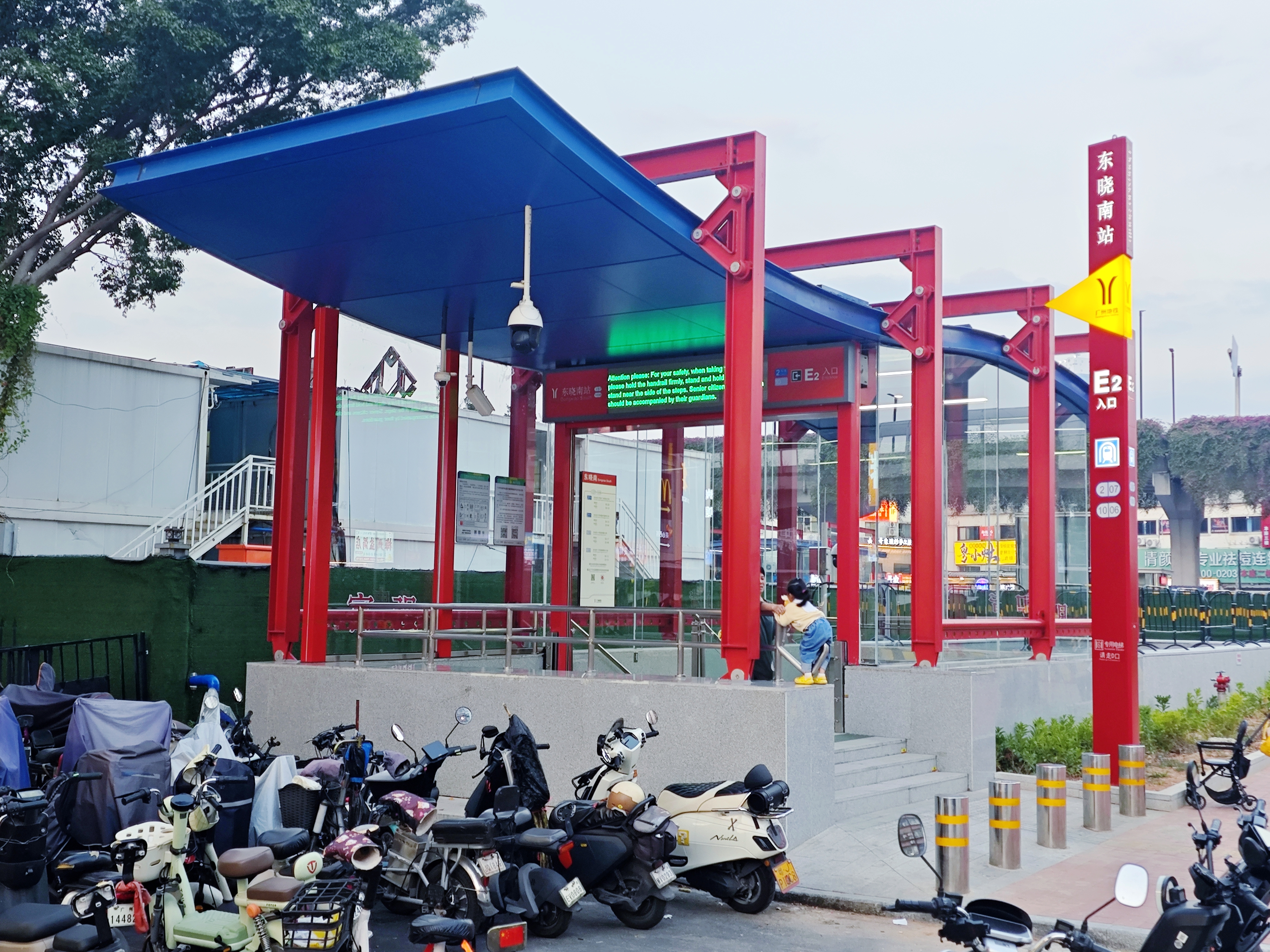
Entrance E2

== Gallery ==
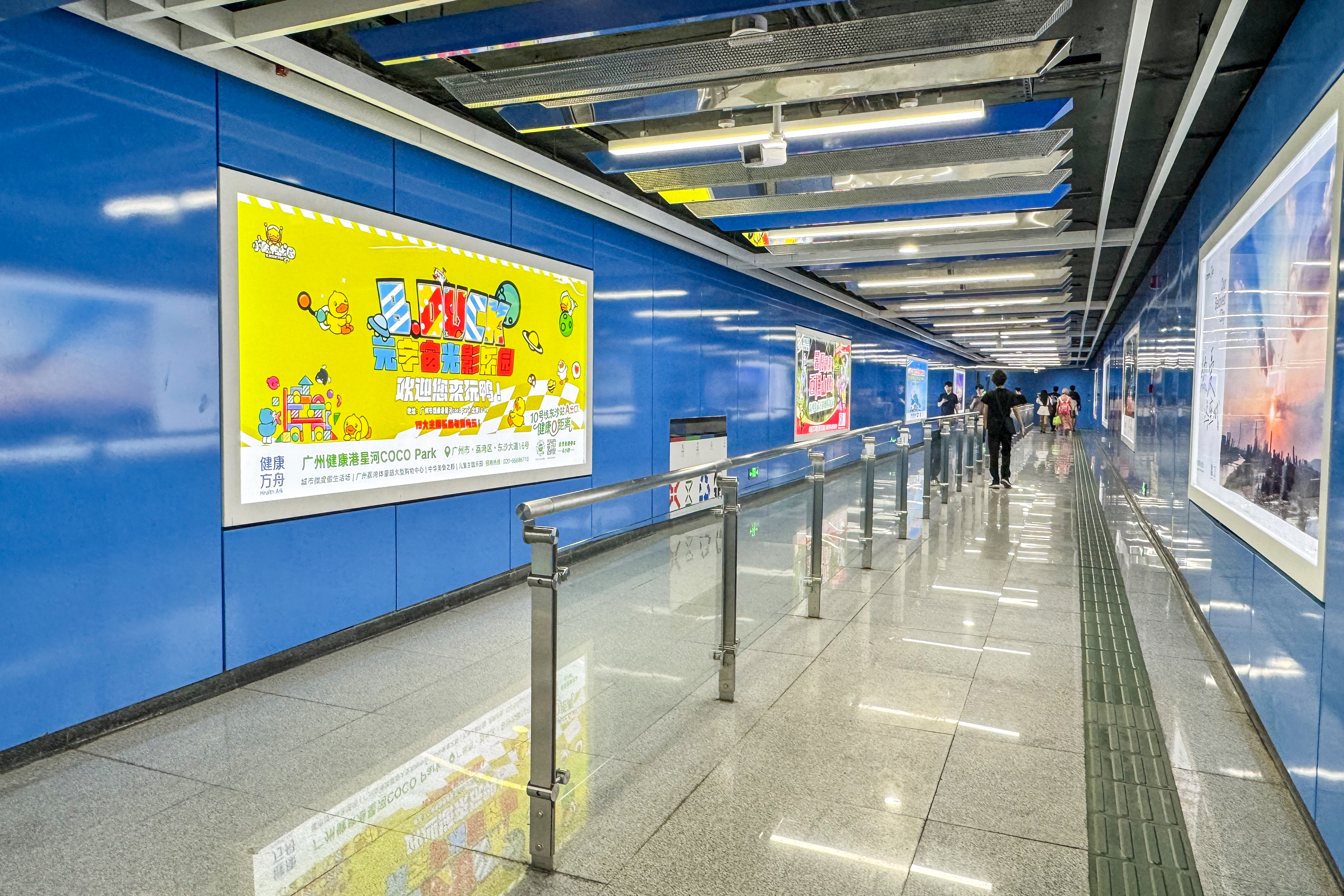
Transfer passage between the two lines

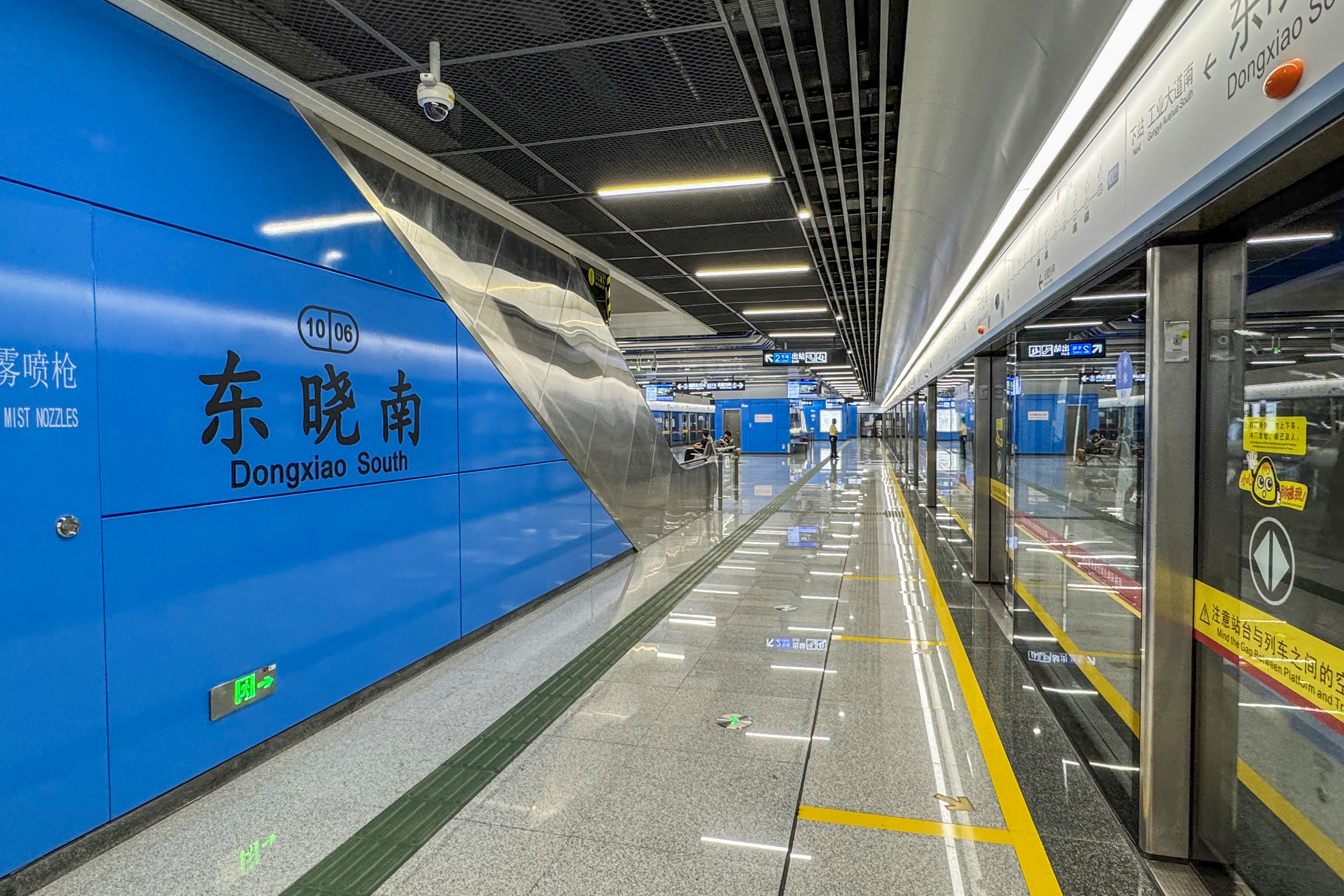
Line 10 platform

== History ==
=== Planning and construction ===
The station first appeared in 1997 in the "Guangzhou City Urban Rapid Rail Traffic Line Network Planning Research (Final Report)" in the Line 2/8 split project after an original Line 2 station along the line, then named Dongxiao Nanlu (Road South) Station, in which the location is essentially the same as the current one. In 2010, in the 2010 "2020-2040 Public Consultation Plan for Subway Network Planning", the Line 3 branch dismantling project of Line 10 incorporated the station into the line project for interchange with Line 2.

Subsequently, construction officially started in 2007. On 16 March 2009, a subsidence occurred next to the Xiaogang Bay Public Bus Stop on Dongxiao Road South from south to north next to the construction site, covering an area of about 10 square meters, and dozens of nearby residents were forced to evacuate, but fortunately there were no casualties.

On 28 September 2010, the station officially opened with the opening of the new Lines 2 and 8. On 16 December of the same year, Exits C1 and C2 were officially opened.

The Line 10 station began enclosure construction on 30 April 2020. At the same time, in order to cooperate with the construction of Line 10 station, the Line 2 Exits C1 and C2 will be closed and dismantled from 21 August 2020. In order to reduce the impact on the surrounding area during construction, the former will be used as a transfer passage in the paid area in the initial opening of Line 10, and the latter will not start construction until the eve of the Line 10 station opening. The station entered the main construction phase in October 2021. On March 31, 2025, the site completed the "three rights" transfer. On 29 June 2025, the Line 10 station was officially opened, and the station became an interchange station. The English name of this site has also been changed from Dongxiaonan to Dongxiao South earlier.

=== Operational incidents ===
At 18:50 on 2 September 2013, a Line 2 train from this station travelling towards Guangzhou South Railway Station was pulled to a stop by a passenger who left his luggage on the platform to urgently unlock the door. Passengers fled to the front of the carriage in panic, causing chaos and delaying train service for more than 10 minutes. In the aftermath of this incident, the Guangzhou Metro closed the lookout windows of all trains on the entire network for a short period of time on safety grounds, causing dissatisfaction among some citizens.

During COVID-19 pandemic control rules at the end of 2022, due to the impact of prevention and control measures, station service was suspended from 09:00 on 5 November 2022 to the afternoon of 30 November 2022. During that time, it served candidates for college entrance examinations and other examinations, and normal services were still provided until 09:00 on the 5th and 6th.
