= Shixi station =

Guangfo Metro station in Guangzhou, China

Shixi 石溪
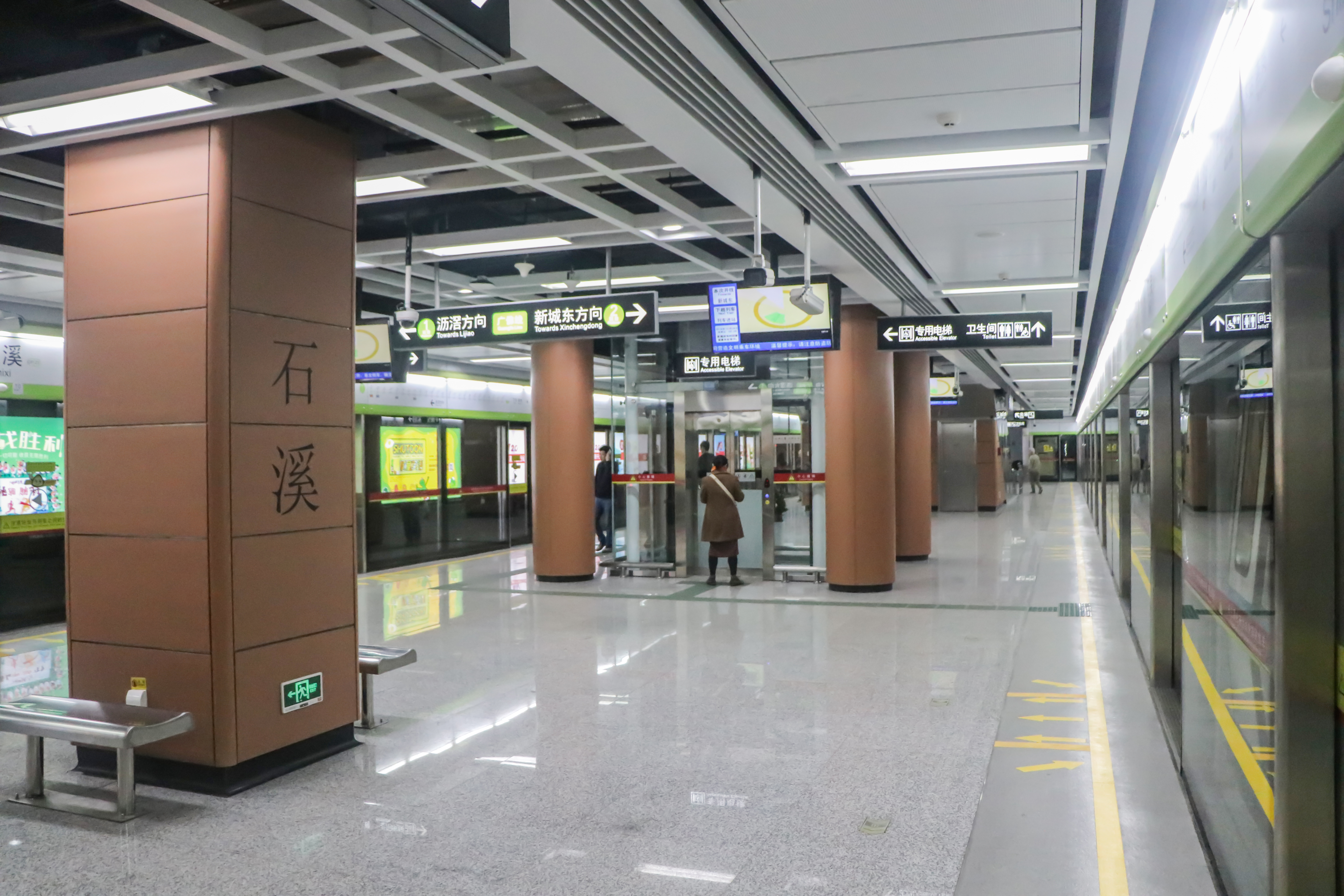
- Platform

Chinese name
- Simplified Chinese: 石溪站
- Traditional Chinese: 石溪站
Transcriptions
Standard Mandarin
- Hanyu Pinyin: Shíxī Zhàn
Yue: Cantonese
- Yale Romanization: Sehkkāi Jaahm
- Jyutping: Sek^{6}kai^{1} Zaam^{6}
- Hong Kong Romanization: Shek Kai station

General information
- Location: West side of the intersection of Gongye Avenue South (工業大道南) and Xingye Road (新業路); Ruibao Subdistrict, Haizhu District, Guangzhou, Guangdong; China
- Coordinates: 23°4′21″N 113°16′57″E
- Operated by: Guangzhou Metro Co. Ltd.
- Line: Guangfo line
- Platforms: 2 (1 island platform)
- Tracks: 2

Construction
- Structure type: Underground
- Accessible: Yes

Other information
- Station code: GF23

History
- Opened: 28 December 2018; 7 years ago

Services
Preceding station	Guangzhou Metro	Following station
Yangang towards Xincheng Dong	Guangfo line	Nanzhou towards Lijiao
Location

Shixi Station (Chinese: 石溪站; pinyin: Shíxī Zhàn; Cantonese Yale: Sehkkāi Jaahm) is a station on the Guangfo Line of the Guangzhou Metro. It is located under Gongye Avenue South (Chinese: 工业大道南) at the intersection with Xingye Road (新業路) near Xinyuying Petrol Station (Chinese: 新裕英加油站) in Haizhu District, Guangzhou, China. It started operations on 28 December 2018.

The station is located about 200 meters away from Gongye Avenue South station on Guangzhou Metro Line 10, but the two stations are not official interchange stations. Interchange between these stations will be treated as two separate journeys requiring two fares.

== Station layout ==
The station is a two-storey underground station. The ground level is the exit, and it is surrounded by Gongye Avenue South, Xingye Road, Yongcui Road, Jinbi Garden Lingcui Garden, other residential areas and other nearby buildings. The first floor is the concourse, and the second floor is the platform for Guangfo line.

G	-	Exits A, B, D
L1; Concourse	Lobby	Ticket Machines, Customer Service, Shops, Police Station, Security Screening Facilities
L2; Platforms	Platform 2	Guangfo towards Xincheng Dong (Shayuan)
L2; Platforms	Island platform, doors will open on the left (Toilets, Nursery)
L2; Platforms	Platform 1	Guangfo towards Lijiao (Nanzhou)

=== Concourse ===
There are automatic ticket machines and an intelligent customer service center at the concourse. There are elevators, escalators, and stairs in the fare-paid area for passengers to reach the platform.

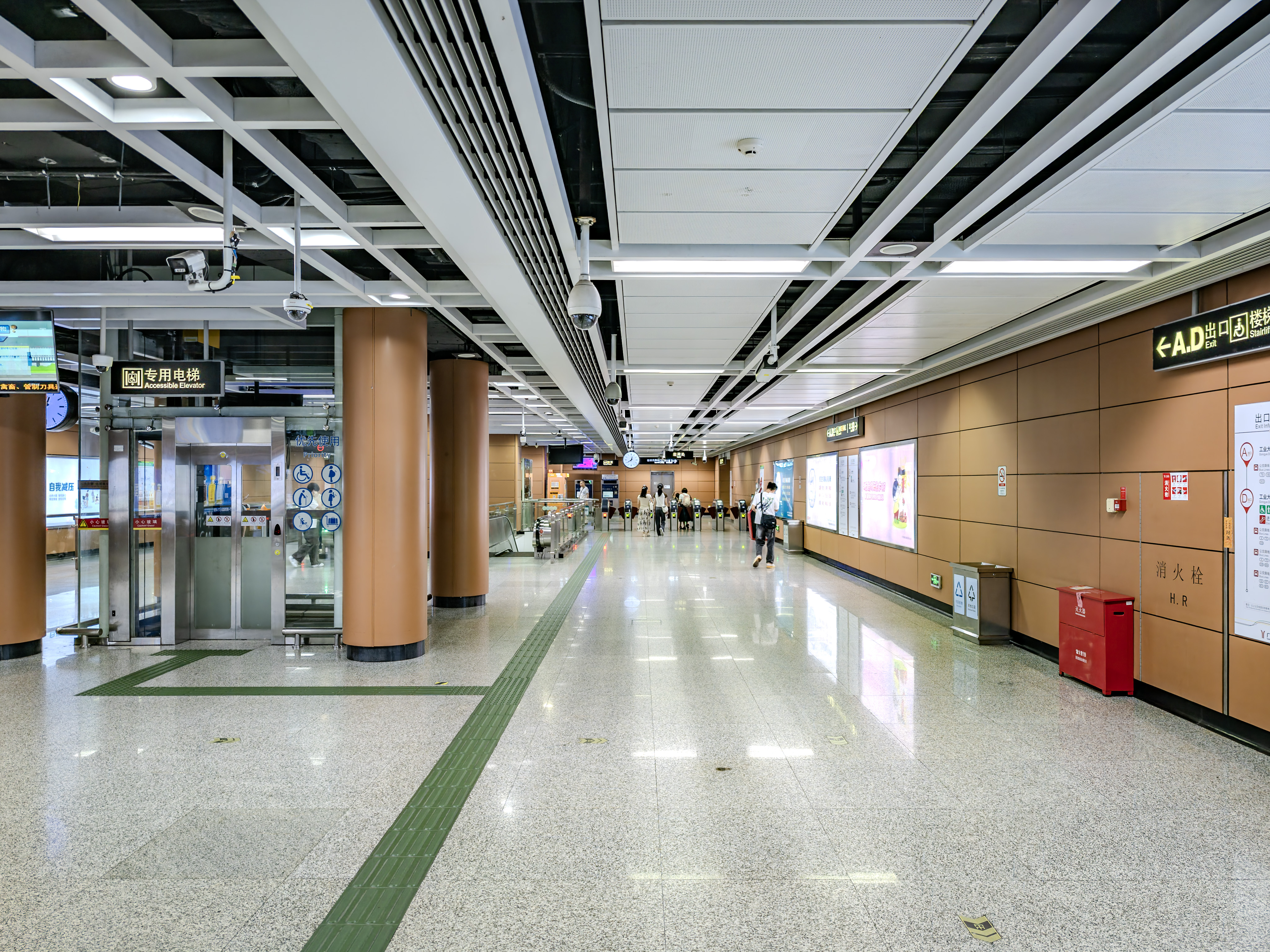
Concourse

=== Platform ===
The station has an island platform located under Gongye Avenue South. Toilets and a nursery room are located at the end of the platform towards Lijiao.

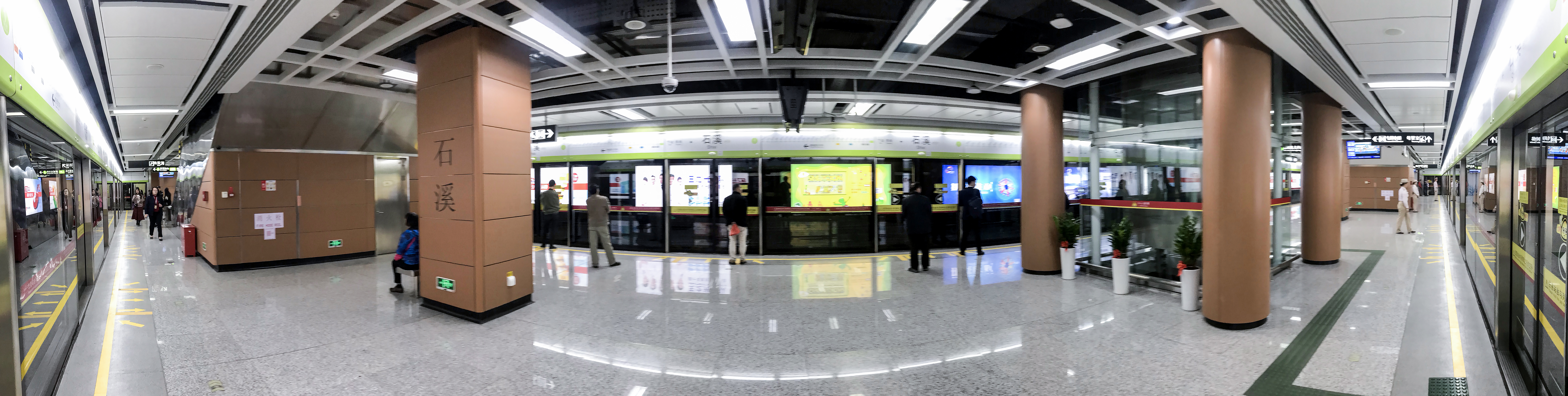
Platform panorama

== Exits ==
The station has 3 points of entry/exit. Exits B and D opened with the station's initial opening, whilst Exit A opened on 16 January 2020. Exit D is accessible via stairlift.

- A: Gongye Avenue South
- B: Gongye Avenue South
- D: Gongye Avenue South
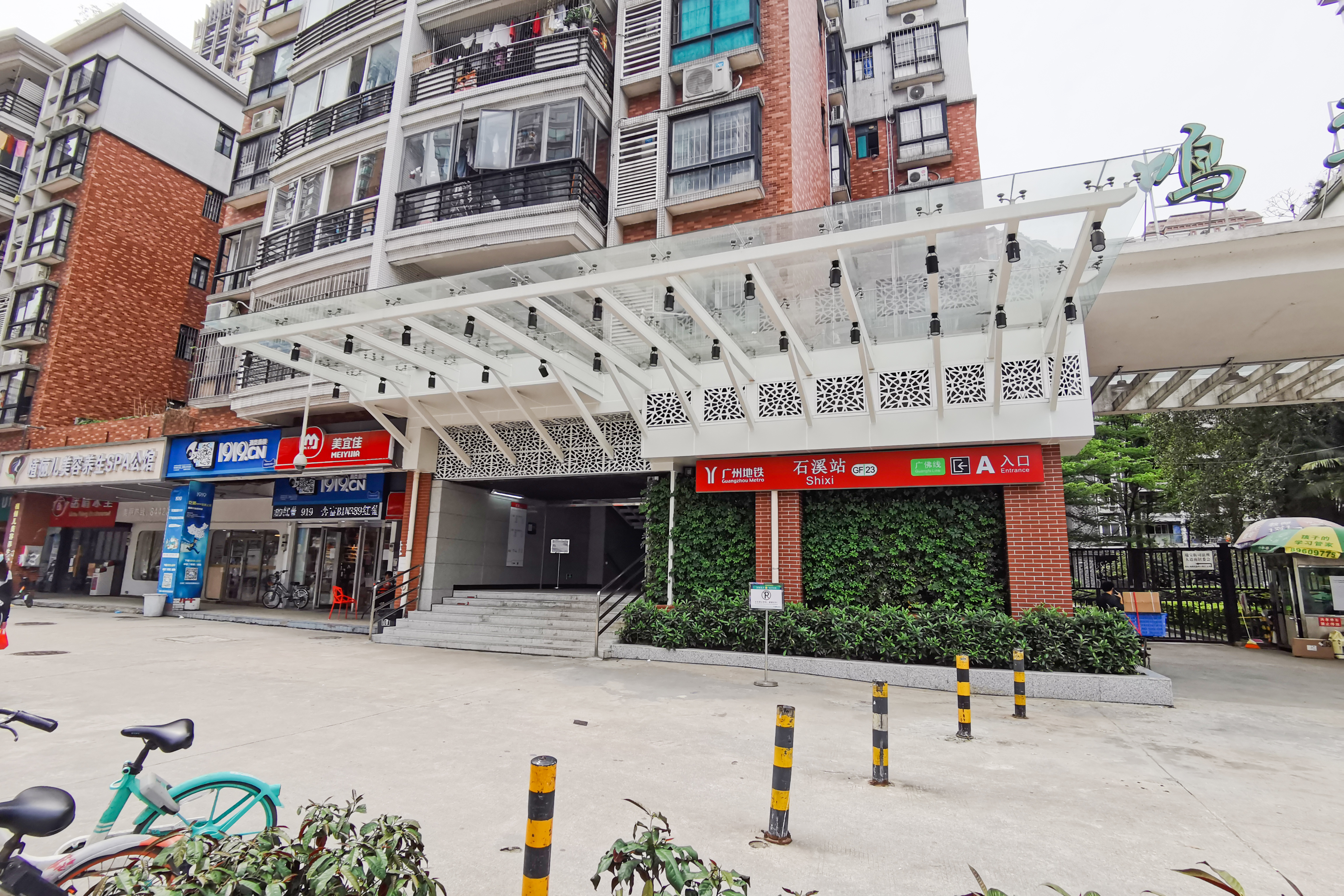
Entrance A

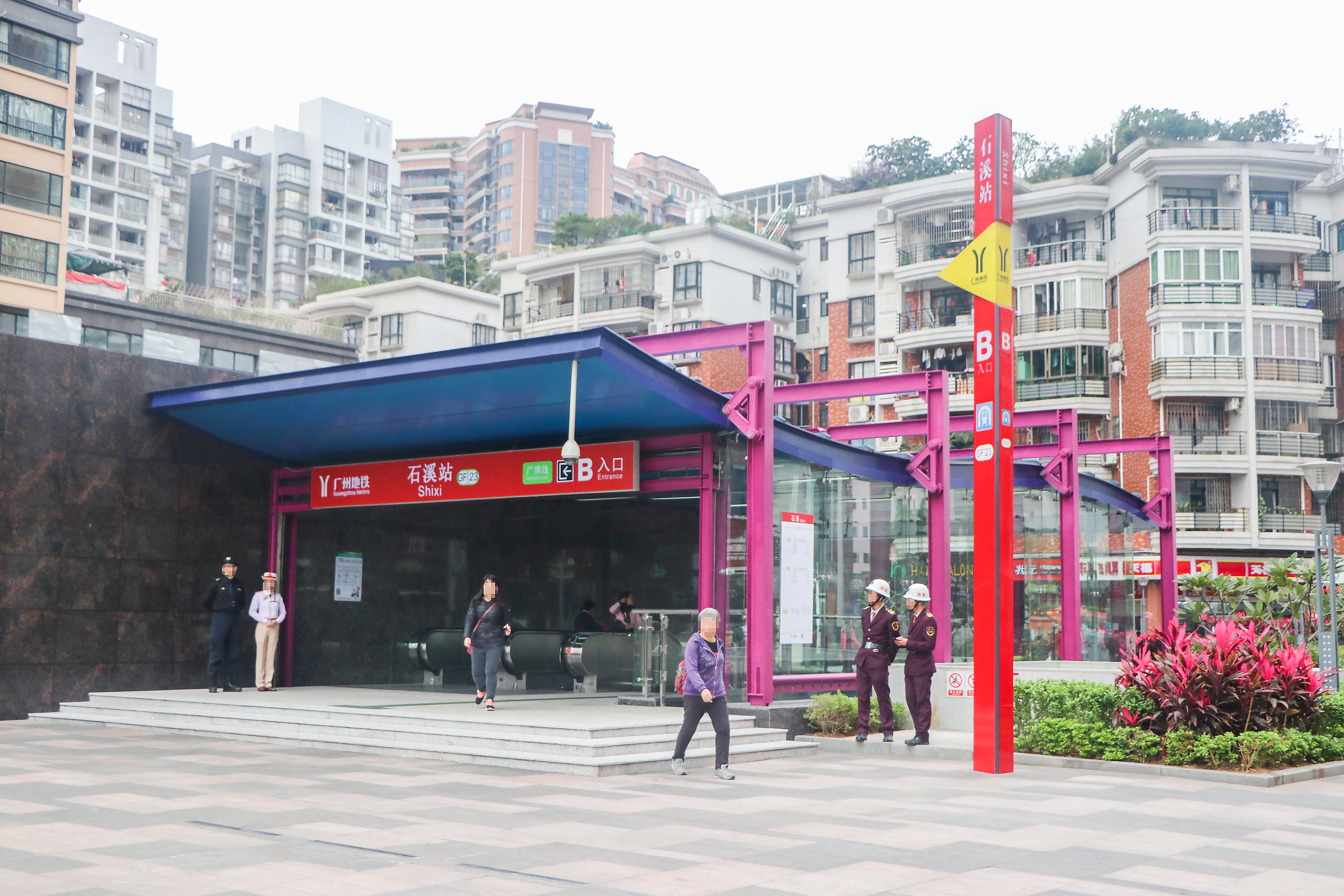
Entrance B

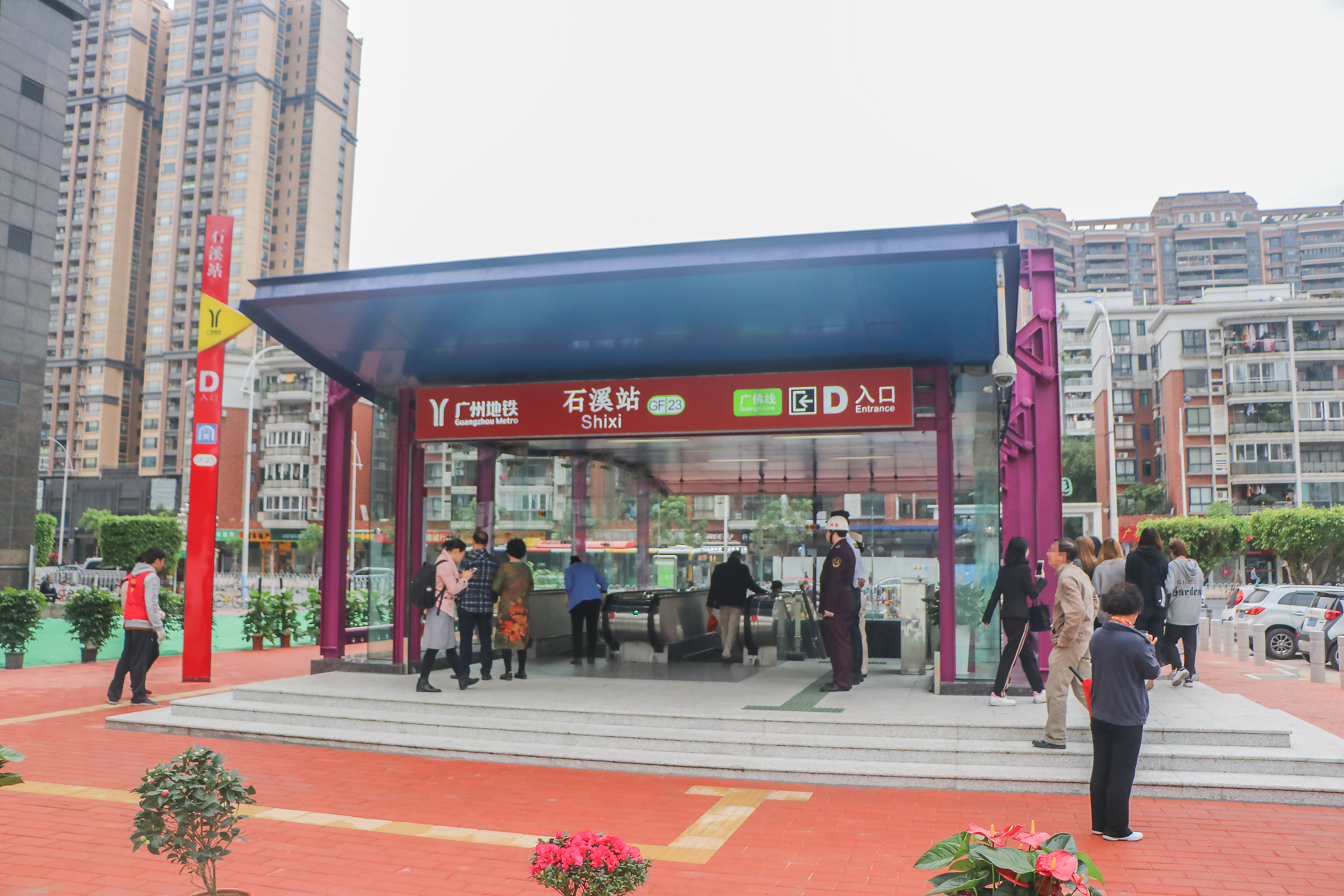
Entrance D

== History ==
In the 1997 "Guangzhou City Urban Expressway, Traffic Line Network Planning Study (Final Report)", this station appeared as the then Gongye Avenue station on Line 4 and later became part of the existing Guangzhou section of the Guangzhou Metro in the 2003 plan.

Construction of this station began in August 2009. In December the same year, a water pipe burst due to the settlement of the foundation, affecting the water supply of tens of thousands of nearby residents. In 2011, the construction of the main structure of the station was completed. Subsequently, the construction party began to fence the southern section of Gongye Avenue South to build exits 3 and 4, but due to the complexity of the land ownership issue, construction did not start until August 2013, during which the authorities criticized the construction for being overdue. After the completion of the underground civil works, due to the delay of the construction of the terminus at Lijiao station, it was not possible to open the station in 2015 together with the Xilang-Yangang section, and the station was still enclosed for a period of time.

With the completion of construction of Lijiao station, the section from this station to Lijiao station was handed over for operation and commissioning on 23 September 2018. On 28 December the same year, the station was opened with the opening of the Yangang to Lijiao section of the Guangfo Metro.

During COVID-19 pandemic control rules at the end of 2022, due to the impact of prevention and control measures, station service was suspended from 09:00 on 5 November 2022 to the afternoon of 30 November 2022. During that time, it served candidates for college entrance examinations and other examinations, and normal services were still provided until 09:00 on the 5th and 6th.
