= Nanzhou station (Guangzhou Metro) =

Guangzhou Metro station

Coordinates: 23.0646°N 113.2976°E

Nanzhou 南洲
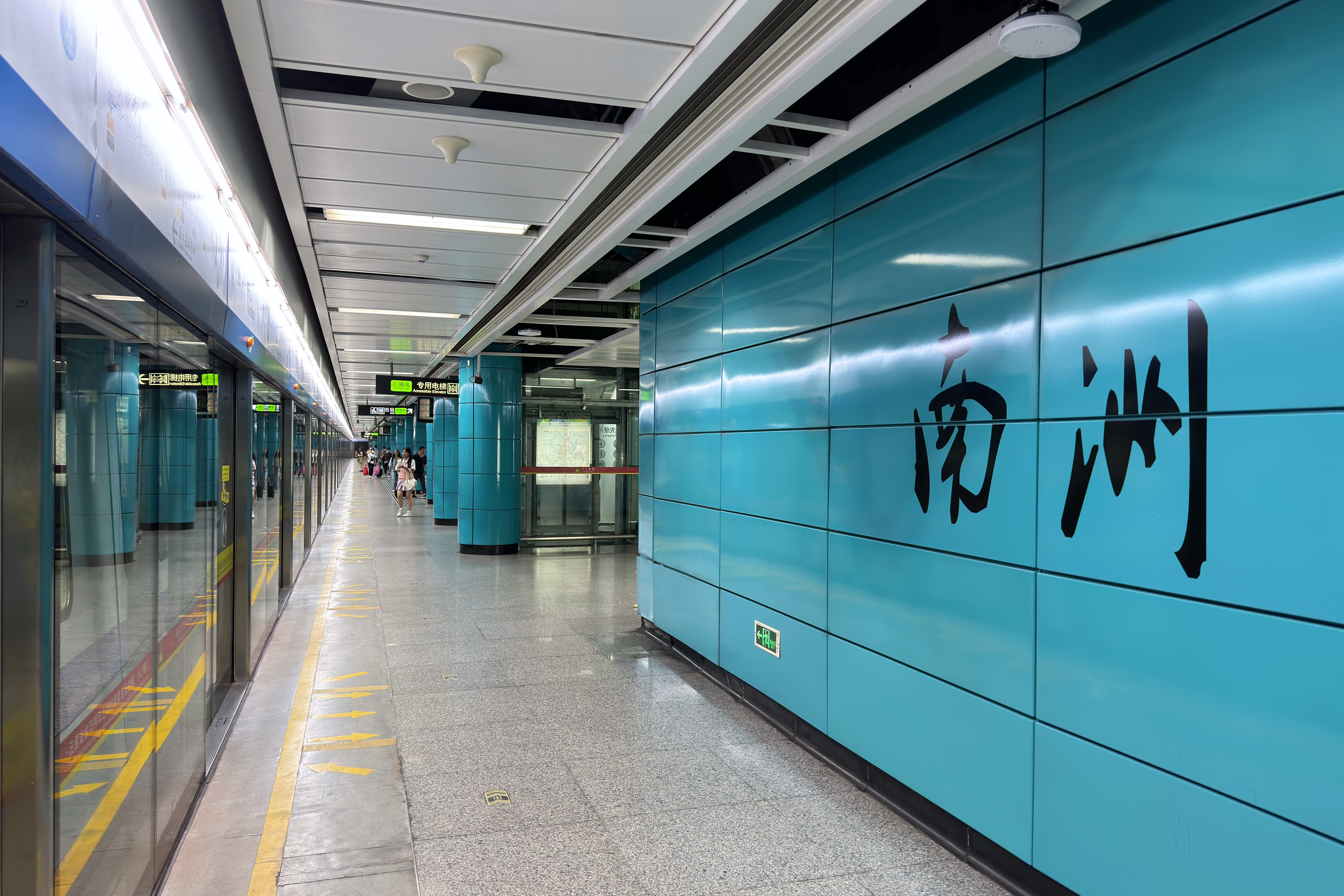
- Platform 1 (Line 2 towards Jiahewanggang)

Chinese name
- Chinese: 南洲站
Transcriptions
Standard Mandarin
- Hanyu Pinyin: Nánzhōu Zhàn
Yue: Cantonese
- Yale Romanization: Nàahmjāu Jaahm
- Jyutping: Naam4zau1 Zaam6
- Hong Kong Romanization: Nam Chau station

General information
- Location: Haizhu District, Guangzhou, Guangdong; China
- Operator: Guangzhou Metro Co. Ltd.
- Lines: Line 2; Guangfo line
- Platforms: 4 (2 island platforms)
- Tracks: 4

Construction
- Structure type: Underground
- Accessible: Yes

Other information
- Station code: 206 GF24

History
- Opened: 25 September 2010; 16 years ago (Line 2); 28 December 2018; 7 years ago (Guangfo Line)

Services
Preceding station	Guangzhou Metro	Following station
Luoxi towards Guangzhou South Railway Station	Line 2	Dongxiao South towards Jiahewanggang
Shixi towards Xincheng Dong	Guangfo line	Lijiao Terminus
Location

Nanzhou Station (Chinese: 南洲站; Jyutping: naam4 zau1 zaam6; Cantonese Yale: Nàahmjāu Jaahm), formerly Nanzhou Coach Station (南洲客运站; 南洲客運站; naam4 zau1 haak3 wan6 zaam6; Nàahmjāu Haak'wahnjaahm) during its planning stages, is an interchange station between Line 2 and the Guangfo line of the Guangzhou Metro.

The underground station is located under the junction of Nanzhou Road and Dongxiao Road South, near the Nanzhou Coach Station in Haizhu District, Guangzhou. The station for Line 2 started operation on 25 September 2010 and the station for Guangfo Line started operation on 28 December 2018.

== Station layout ==
G	Street level	Exits A, B, C1, C2, D
L1; Concourse	Lobby	Customer Service, Shops, Vending machines, ATMs
L2; Platforms	Platform 4	Guangfo towards Xincheng Dong (Shixi)
L2; Platforms	Island platform, doors will open on the left
L2; Platforms	Platform 3	Guangfo towards Lijiao (Terminus)
L3; Platforms	Platform 2	2 towards Guangzhou South Railway Station (Luoxi)
L3; Platforms	Island platform, doors will open on the left
L3; Platforms	Platform 1	2 towards Jiahewanggang (Dongxiao South)

== Exits ==
There are 3 exits leading in and out of the station, with 1 exit having 2 sub-exits.

== Gallery ==
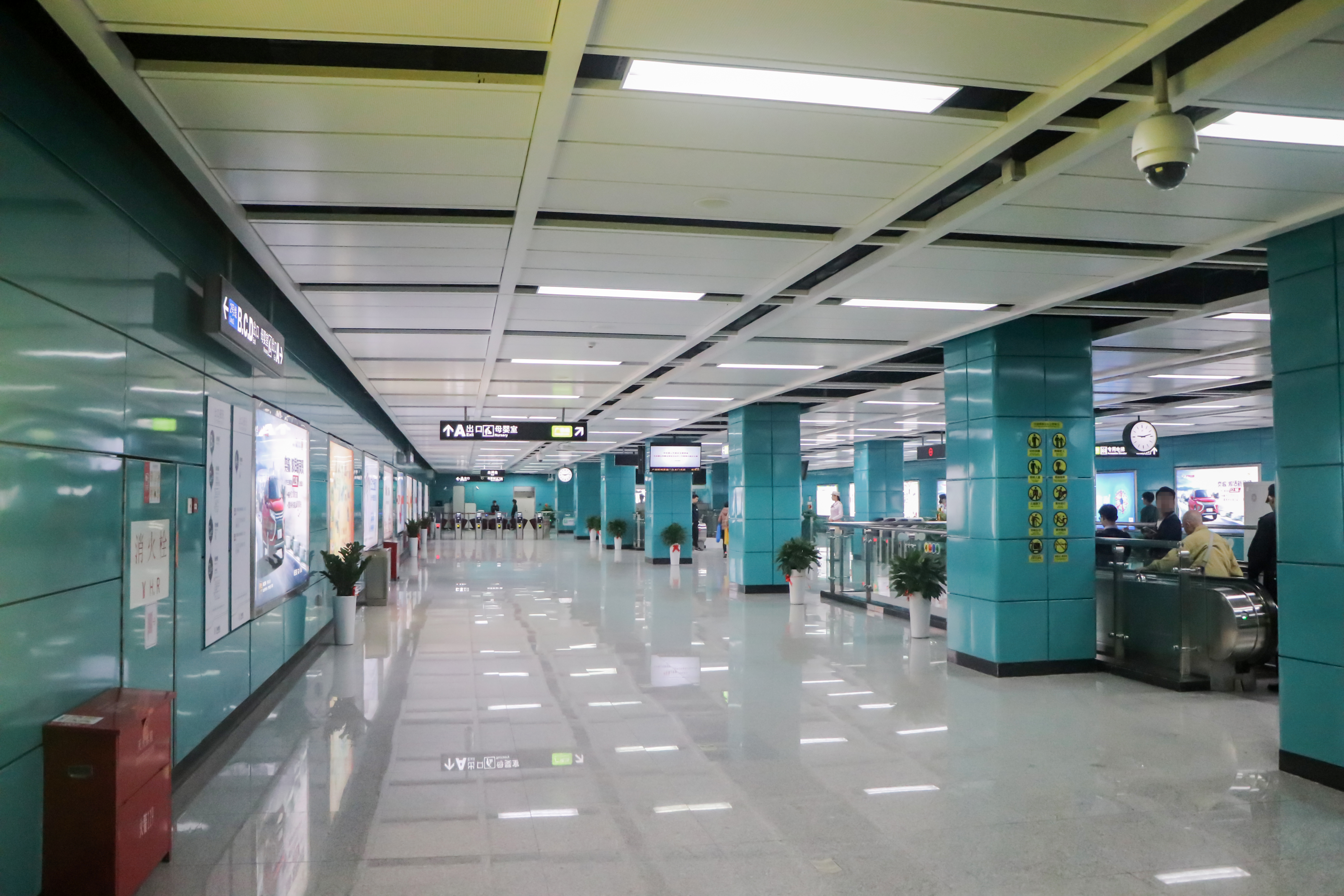
Line 2 concourse

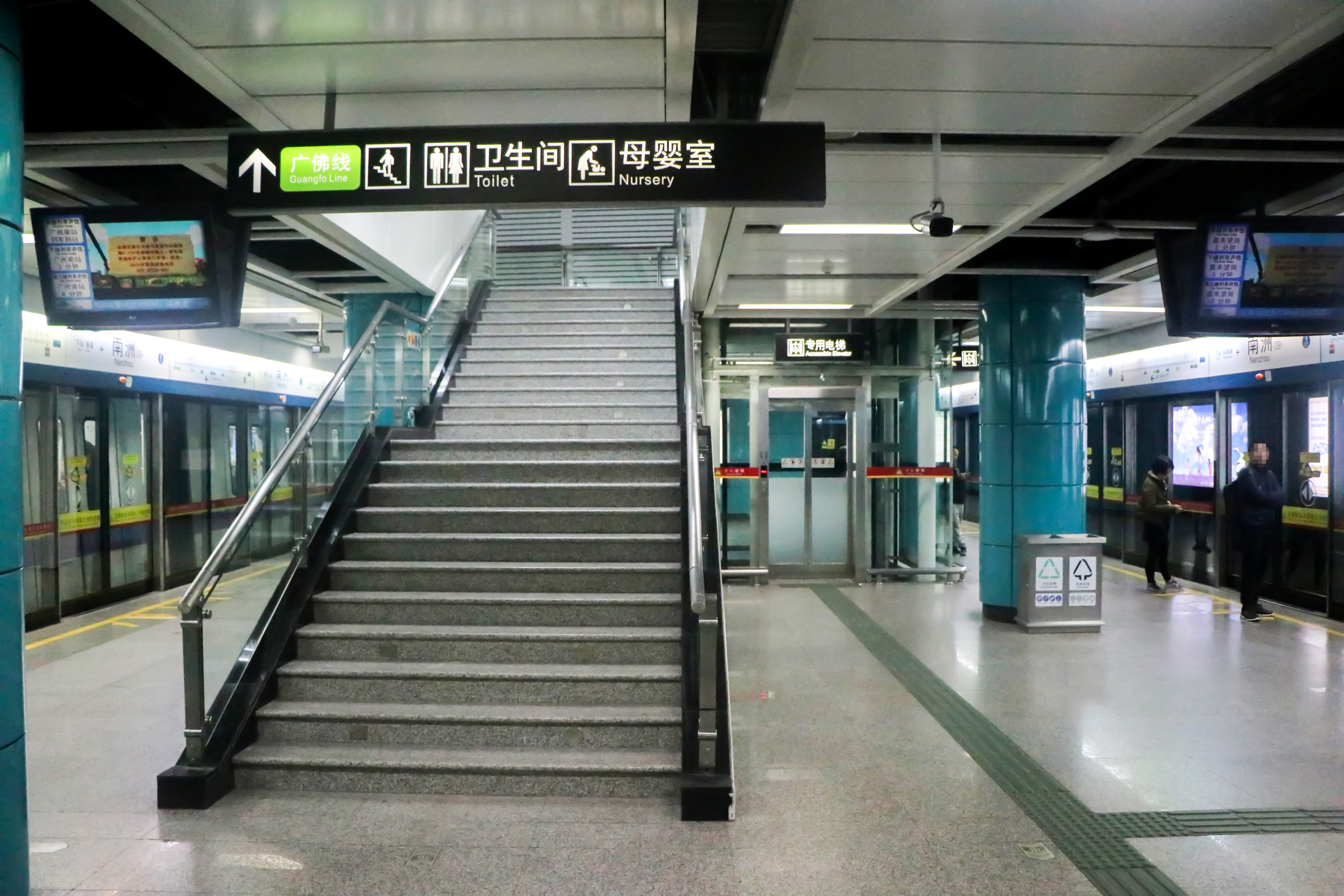
Transfer node to Guangfo line from Line 2

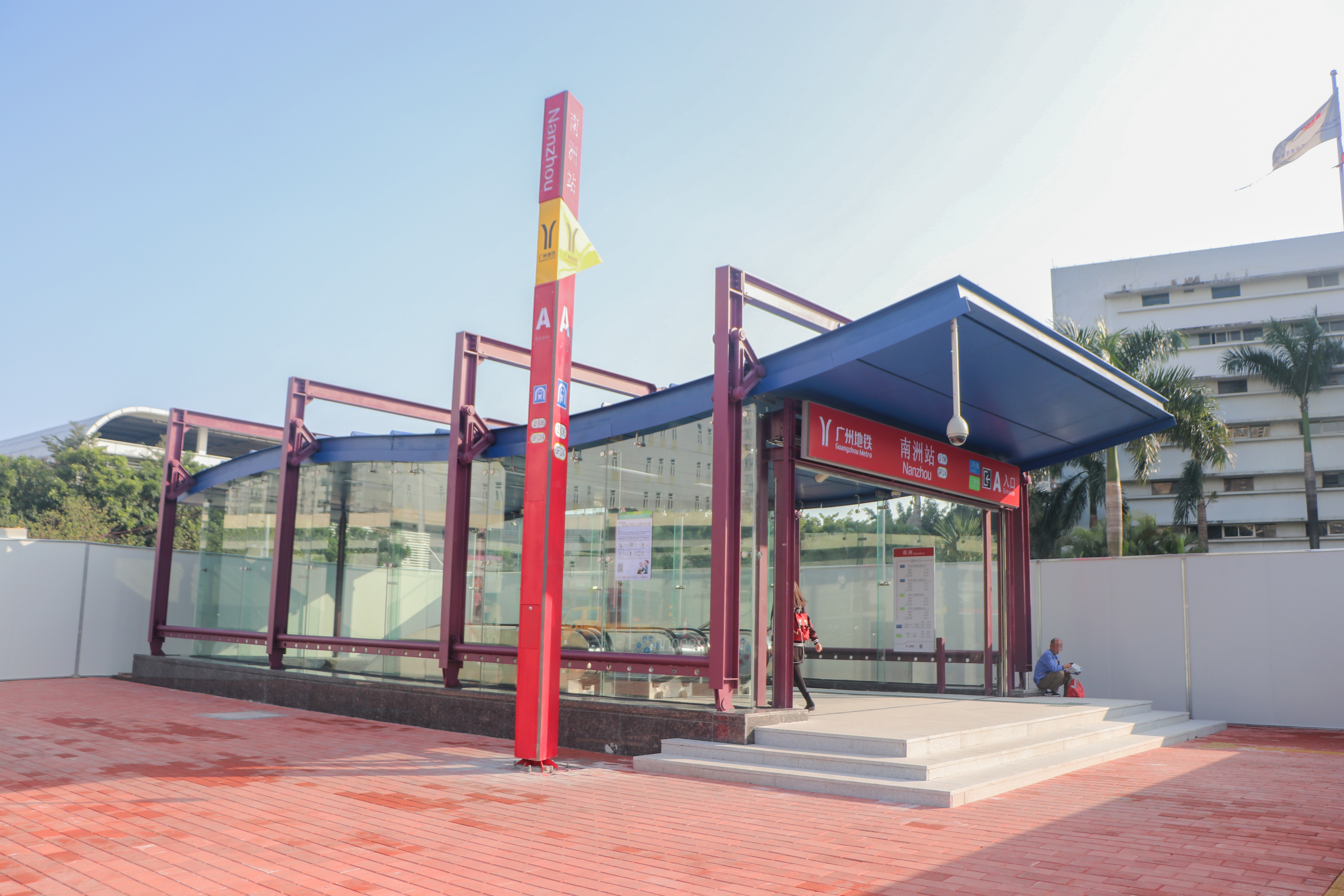
Exit A

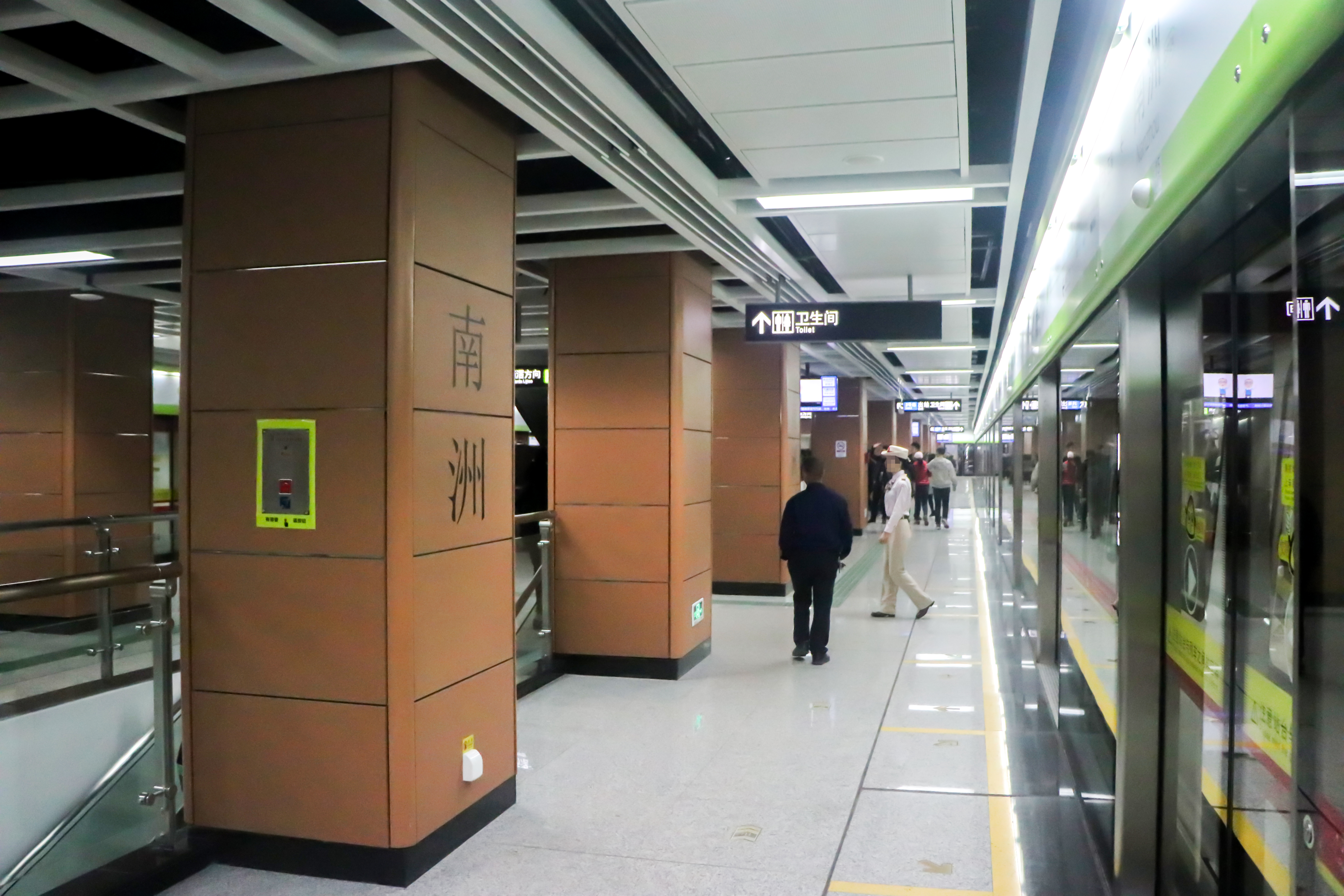
Platform 4 (Guangfo Line towards Xincheng Dong)
