= Daganwei station =

Guangzhou Metro Line 10 station

Daganwei 大干围
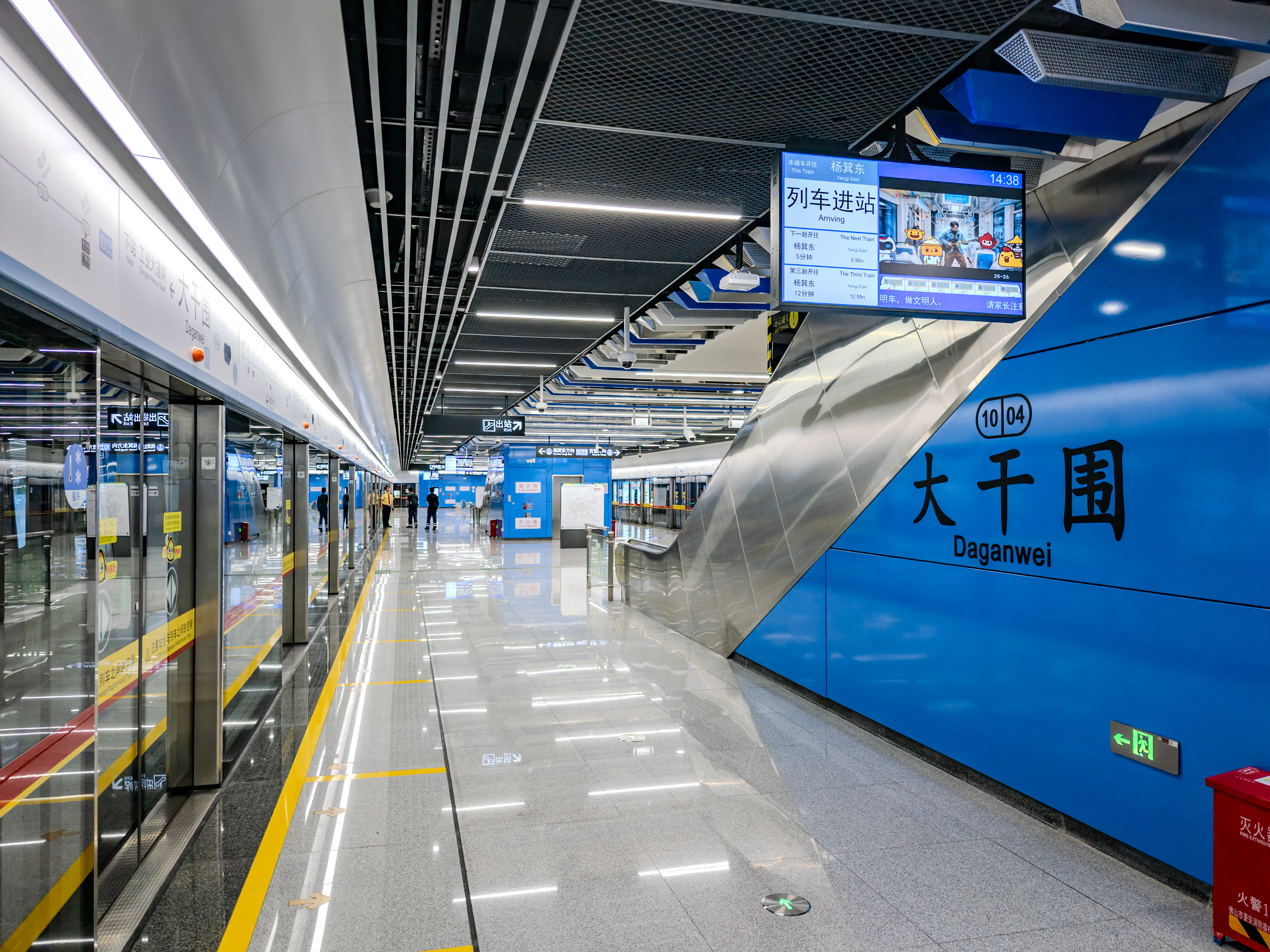
- Platform

Chinese name
- Simplified Chinese: 大干围站
- Traditional Chinese: 大幹圍站
Transcriptions
Standard Mandarin
- Hanyu Pinyin: Dàgànwéi Zhàn
Yue: Cantonese
- Yale Romanization: Daaihgonwàih Jaahm
- Jyutping: Daai^{6}gon^{3}wai^{4} Zaam^{6}
- Hong Kong Romanization: Tai Kon Wai station

General information
- Location: North of Xinye Road (新业路); Ruibao Subdistrict, Haizhu District, Guangzhou, Guangdong; China
- Coordinates: 23°3′47.81″N 113°16′42.38″E
- Operator: Guangzhou Metro Co. Ltd.
- Line: Line 10
- Platforms: 2 (1 island platform)
- Tracks: 2

Construction
- Structure type: Underground
- Accessible: Yes

Other information
- Station code: 1004

History
- Opened: 29 June 2025 (13 months ago)

Services
Preceding station	Guangzhou Metro	Following station
Dongsha towards Xilang	Line 10	Gongye Avenue South towards Yangji East
Location

Daganwei station (simplified Chinese: 大干围站; traditional Chinese: 大幹圍站; Jyutping: daai^{6} gon^{3} wai^{4} zaam^{6}; Cantonese Yale: Daaihgonwàih Jaahm) is a station on Line 10 of the Guangzhou Metro. It is located underground north of Xingye Road, next to the Pearl River rear channel in Guangzhou's Haizhu District. It opened on 29 June 2025.

== Station layout ==
This station is a three-storey underground station. The ground level is the exit, and it is surrounded by Runjiang South Road and other nearby buildings. The first floor is the concourse, the second floor is the station equipment level, and the third floor is the platform for Line 10.

G	-	Exits A and B
L1; Concourse	Lobby	Ticket Machines, Customer Service, Shops, Police Station, Security Facilities
L2; Platforms	Platform 2	10 towards Xilang (Dongsha)
L2; Platforms	Island platform, doors will open on the left (Toilets, Nursery)
L2; Platforms	Platform 1	10 towards Yangji East (Gongye Avenue South)

=== Concourse ===
There are automatic ticket machines and an AI customer service center at the concourse. There are elevators, escalators, and stairs in the fare-paid area for passengers to reach the platform.

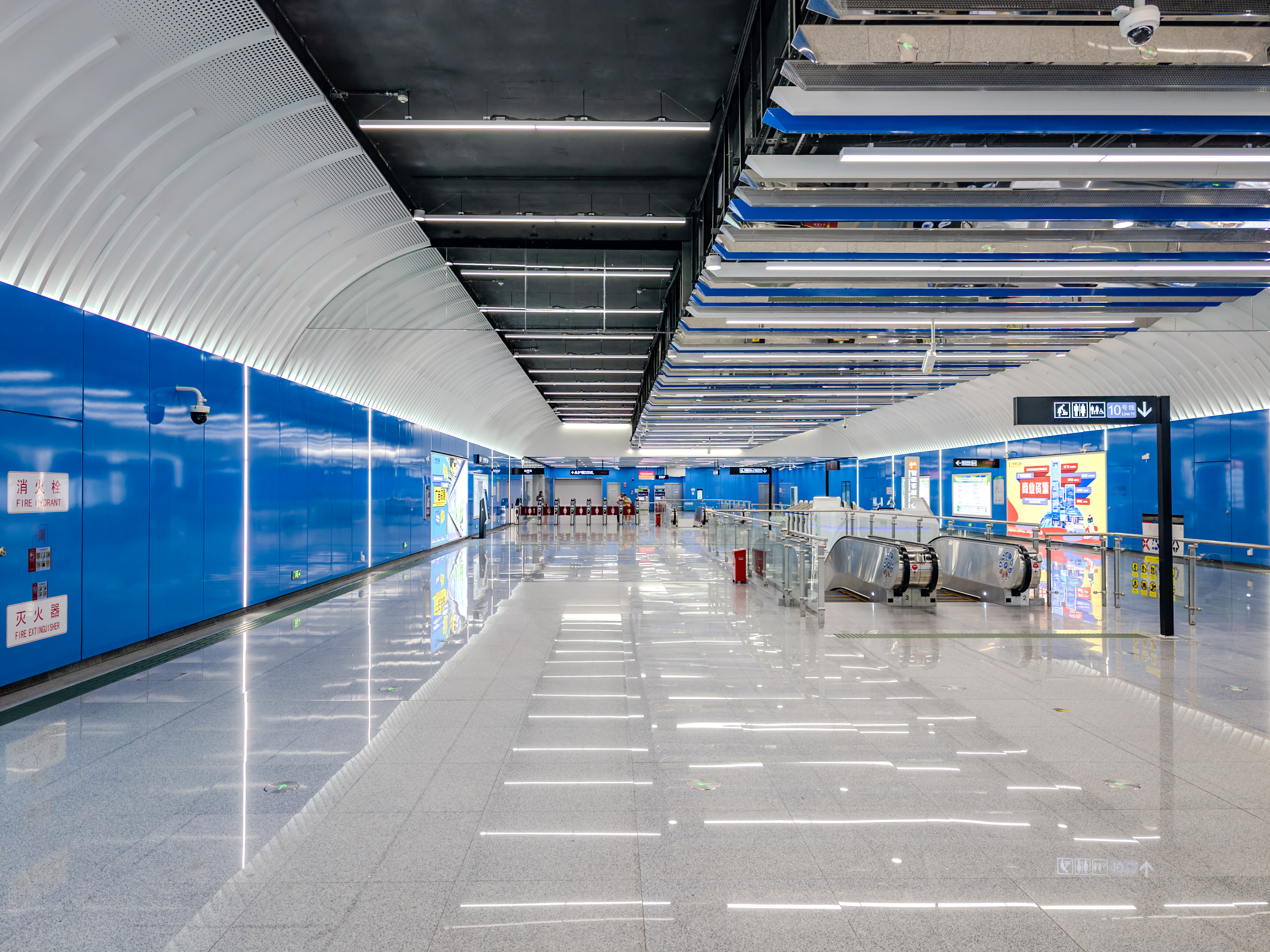
Concourse

=== Platform ===
The station has an island platform located under a planned road. Toilets and a nursery room are located at the end of the platform towards Gongye Avenue South station.

In addition, there is a storage track at the east end of the platform.

=== Entrances/exits ===
The station has 2 points of entry/exit. Exit A is equipped with an elevator.

- A: Huandao Road
- B: Xinye Road
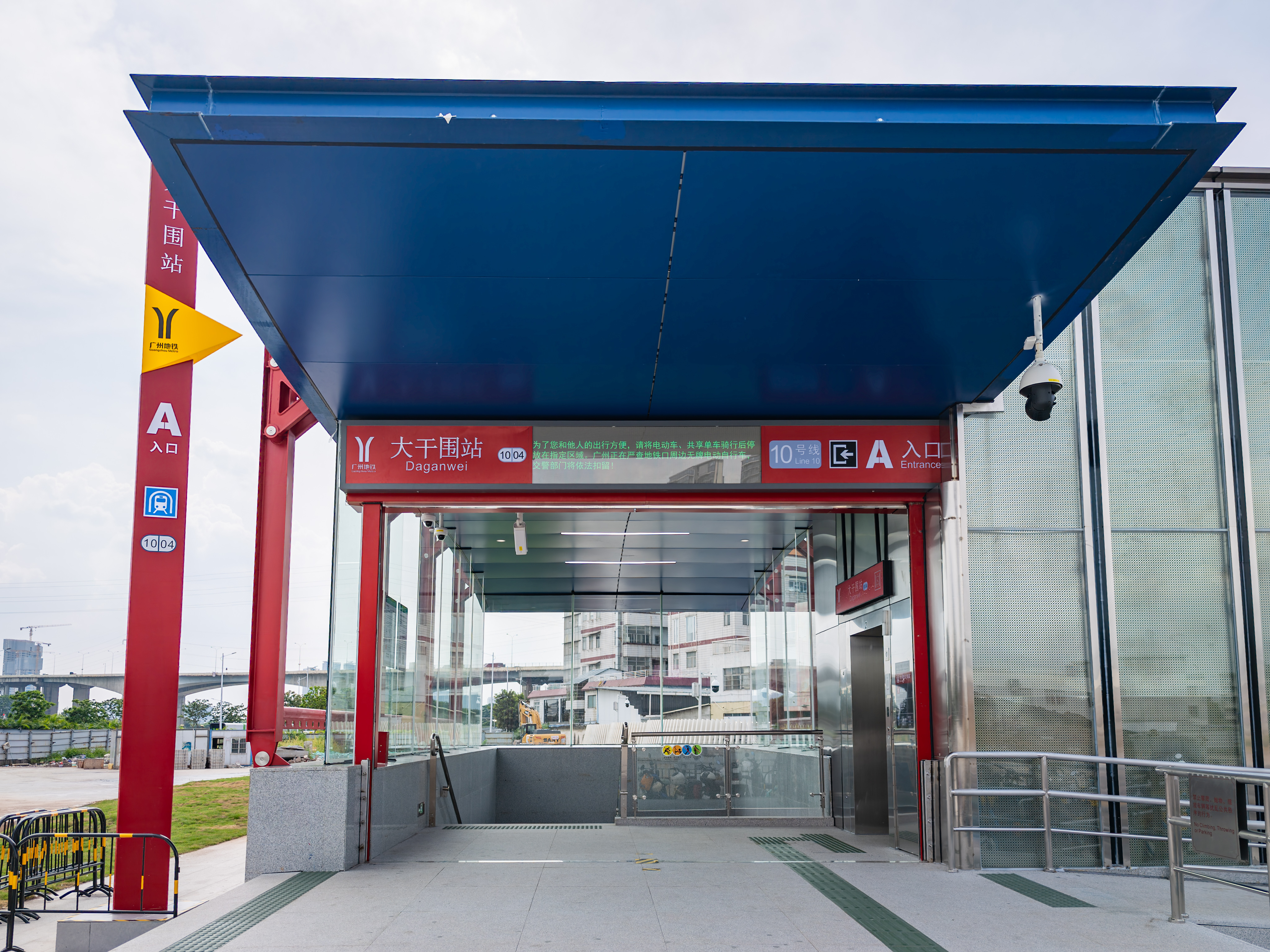
Entrance A

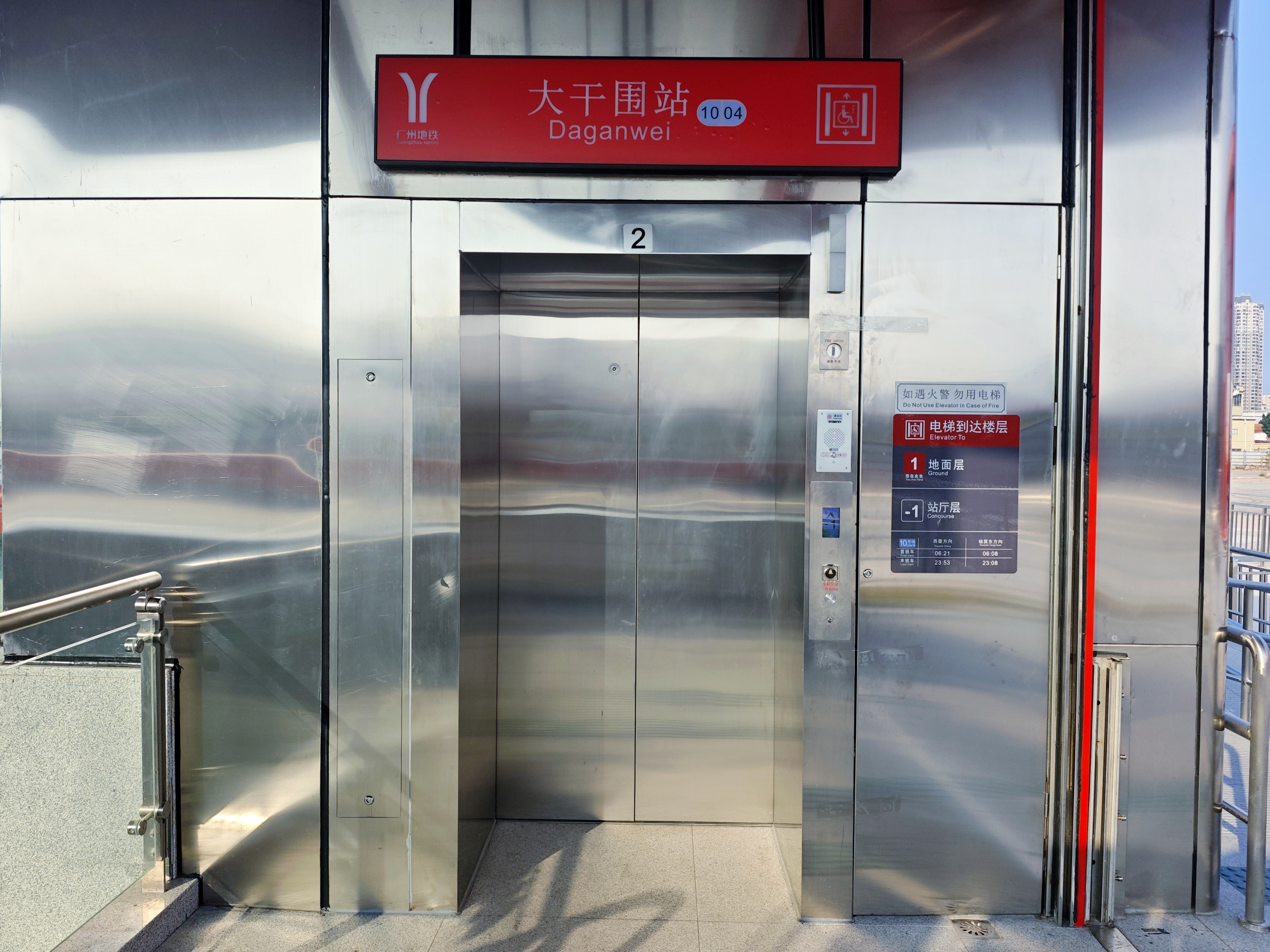
Elevator of Entrance A

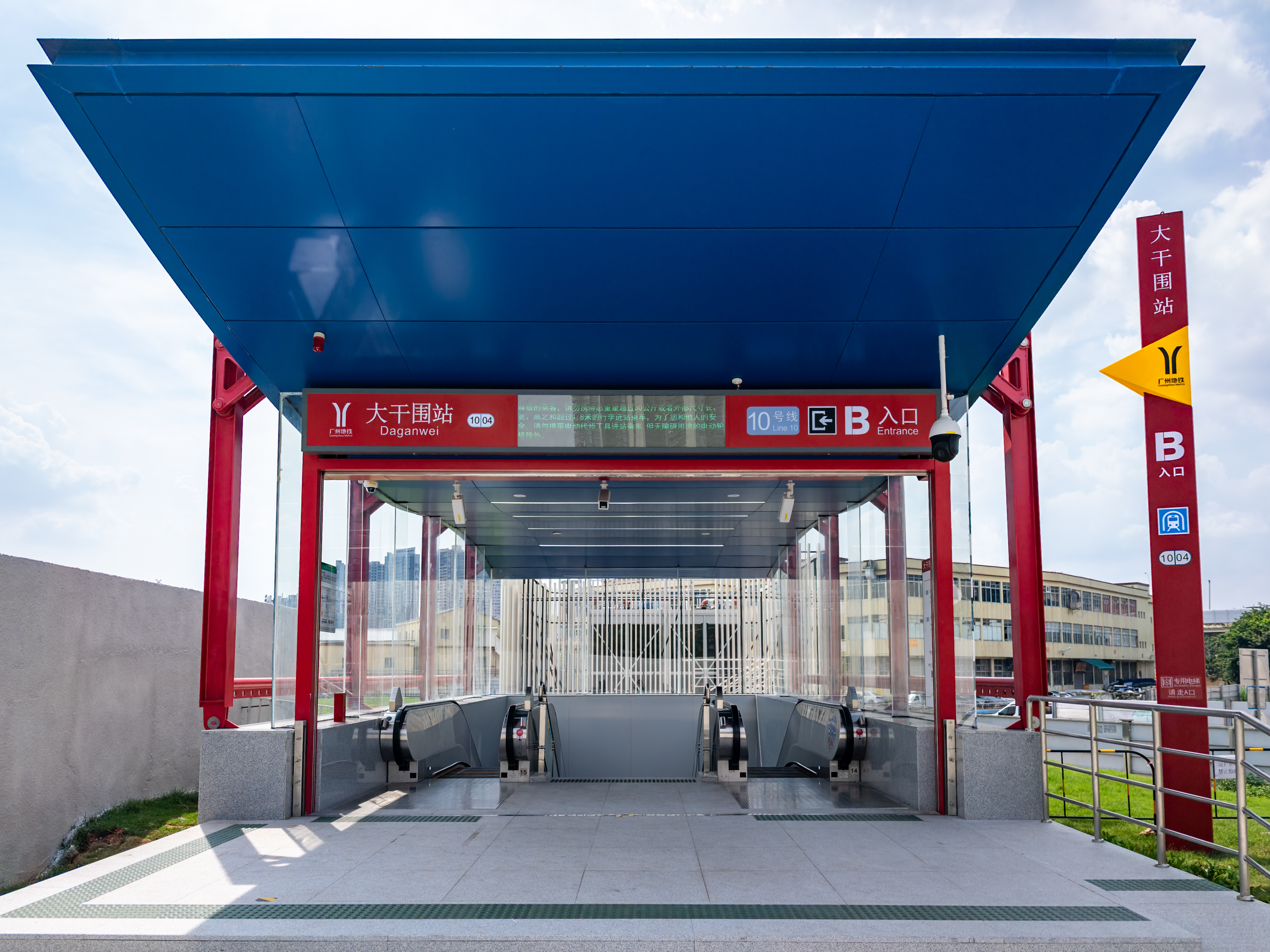
Entrance B

== History ==
The station was named Daganwei station according to the Daganwei Industrial Zone where it is located. On 17 January 2025, the station completed the "three rights" transfer. On 29 June the same year, the station opened.

== Future development ==
In the future, the station will cooperate with the reconstruction of Shixi Village and carry out the development of the TOD above the station. In addition, the planned southern extension of Line 24 is planned to stop here, but no reservations were made during construction of the station.
