= Binjiang East Road station =

Guangzhou Metro Line 10 station

Binjiang East Road 滨江东路
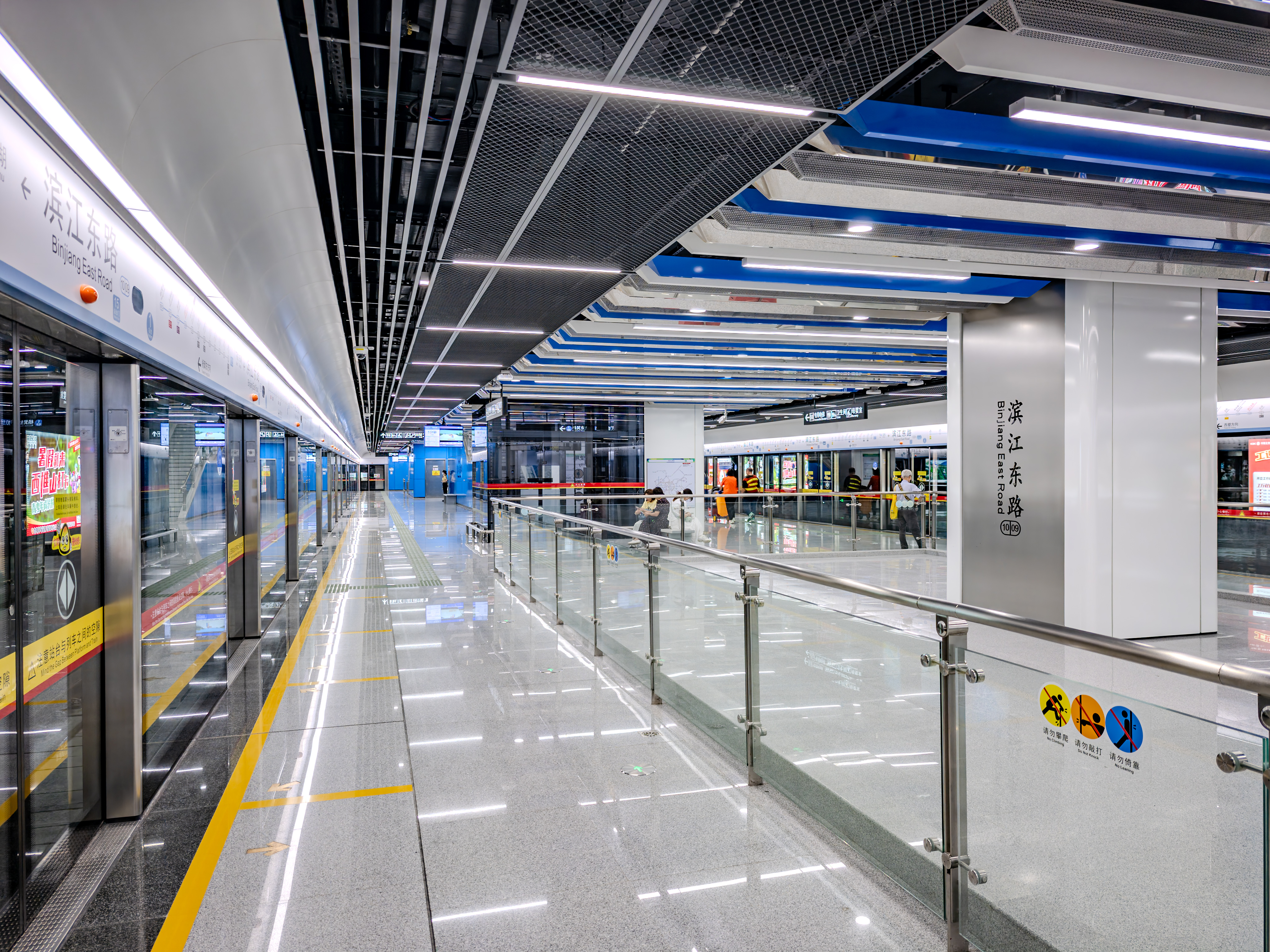
- Platform

Chinese name
- Simplified Chinese: 滨江东路站
- Traditional Chinese: 濱江東路站
Transcriptions
Standard Mandarin
- Hanyu Pinyin: Bīnjiāng Dōnglù Zhàn
Yue: Cantonese
- Yale Romanization: Bāngōng Dūnglouh Jaahm
- Jyutping: Ban^{1} gong^{1} Dung^{1} lou^{6} Zaam^{6}
- Hong Kong Romanization: Pan Kong East Road station

General information
- Location: Intersection of Binjiang East Road (滨江东路) and Yile Road (怡乐路), Xingang Subdistrict; Haizhu District, Guangzhou, Guangdong; China
- Coordinates: 23°06′22″N 113°17′15″E
- Operator: Guangzhou Metro Co. Ltd.
- Line: Line 10
- Platforms: 2 (1 island platform)
- Tracks: 2

Construction
- Structure type: Underground
- Accessible: Yes

Other information
- Station code: 1009

History
- Opened: 29 June 2025 (13 months ago)

Services
Preceding station	Guangzhou Metro	Following station
Sun Yat-sen University South Gate towards Xilang	Line 10	Donghu towards Yangji East
Location

Binjiang East Road Station (simplified Chinese: 滨江东路站; traditional Chinese: 濱江東路站; Jyutping: ban^{1} gong^{1} dung^{1} lou^{6} zaam^{6}; Cantonese Yale: Bāngōng Dūnglouh Jaahm) is a station on Line 10 of the Guangzhou Metro. It is located at the intersection between East Binjiang Road and Yile Road, in the Haizhu District of Guangzhou. The station opened on 29 June 2025.

== Station layout ==
This station is a four-storey underground station. The ground level is the exit, and it is surrounded by Binjiang Road, Yile Road, Haizhu Creek and other nearby buildings. The first floor is the concourse, the second floor is the equipment floor, and the third floor is the platform for Line 10.

G	-	Exits A and B
L1; Concourse	Lobby	Ticket machines, Customer Service, Shops, Police Station, Security Facilities
L2	Mezzanine	Station Equipment
L3; 10 Platforms	Platform 2	10 towards Xilang (Sun Yat-sen University South Gate)
L3; 10 Platforms	Island platform, doors will open on the left (Toilets, Nursery)
L3; 10 Platforms	Platform 1	10 towards Yangji East (Donghu)
		Line 28 Reserved Transfer Level
L4; 28 Reserved Platforms	Platform 3	28 reserved track area
L4; 28 Reserved Platforms	Reserved Island platform
L4; 28 Reserved Platforms	Platform 4	28 reserved track area

=== Concourse ===
The concourse of the station is equipped with electronic ticket vending machines and AI customer service centers. There are elevators, escalators and stairs in the fare-paid area for passengers to access the platform.

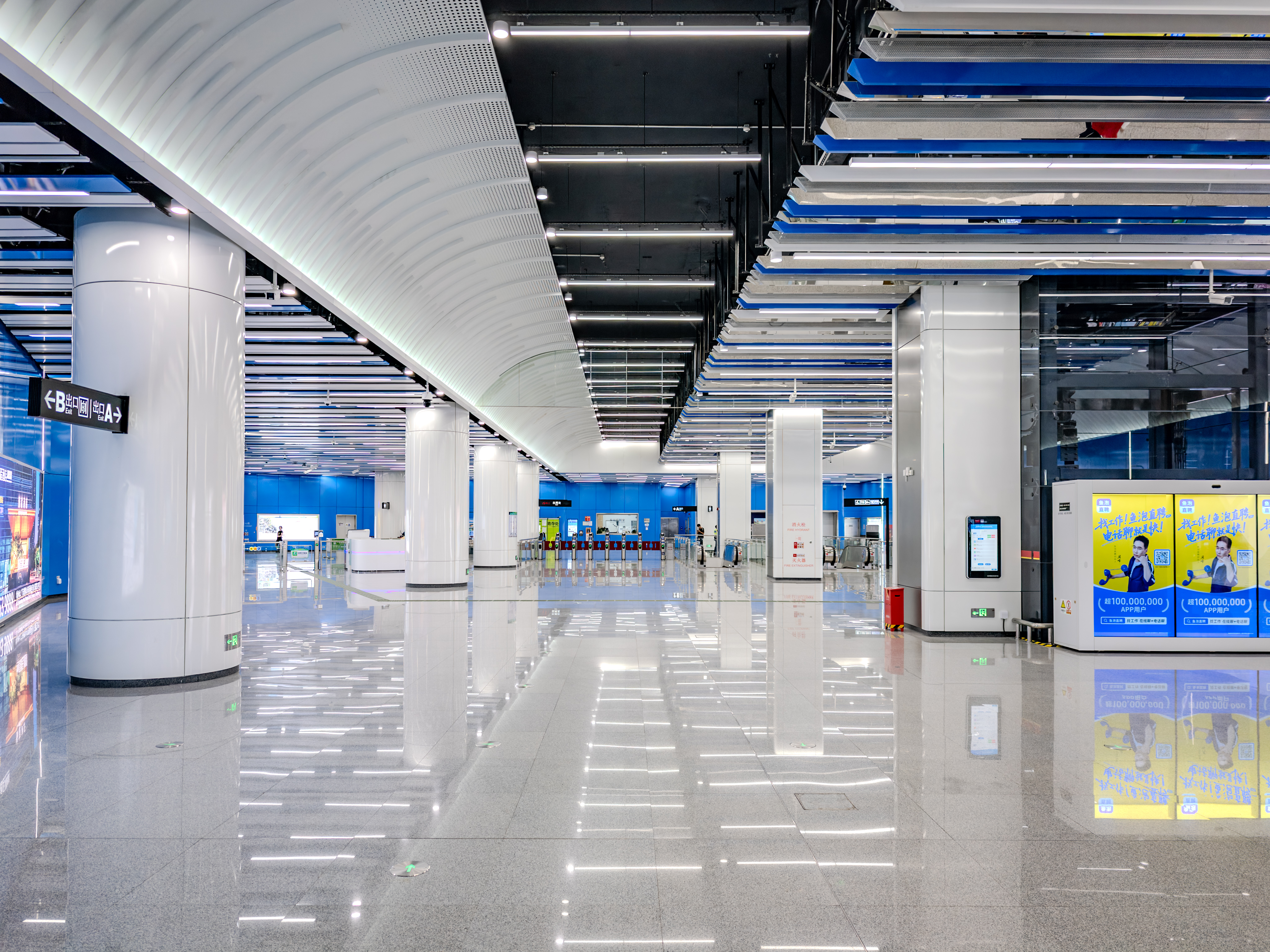

=== Platforms ===
The station has an island platform for Line 10, located under East Binjiang Road. The station also has transfer tunnels and a structure of an island platform in reserve, to be used by Line 28 when it opens. Toilets and a nursery room are located at the end of the platform towards Wufeng.

=== Entrances/exits ===
The station has 2 points of entry/exit, which are situated on Yile Road and East Binjiang Road respectively. Exit B is equipped with an elevator.

- A: Yile Road, Guangzhou Maritime Safety Bureau
- B: Binjiang East Road
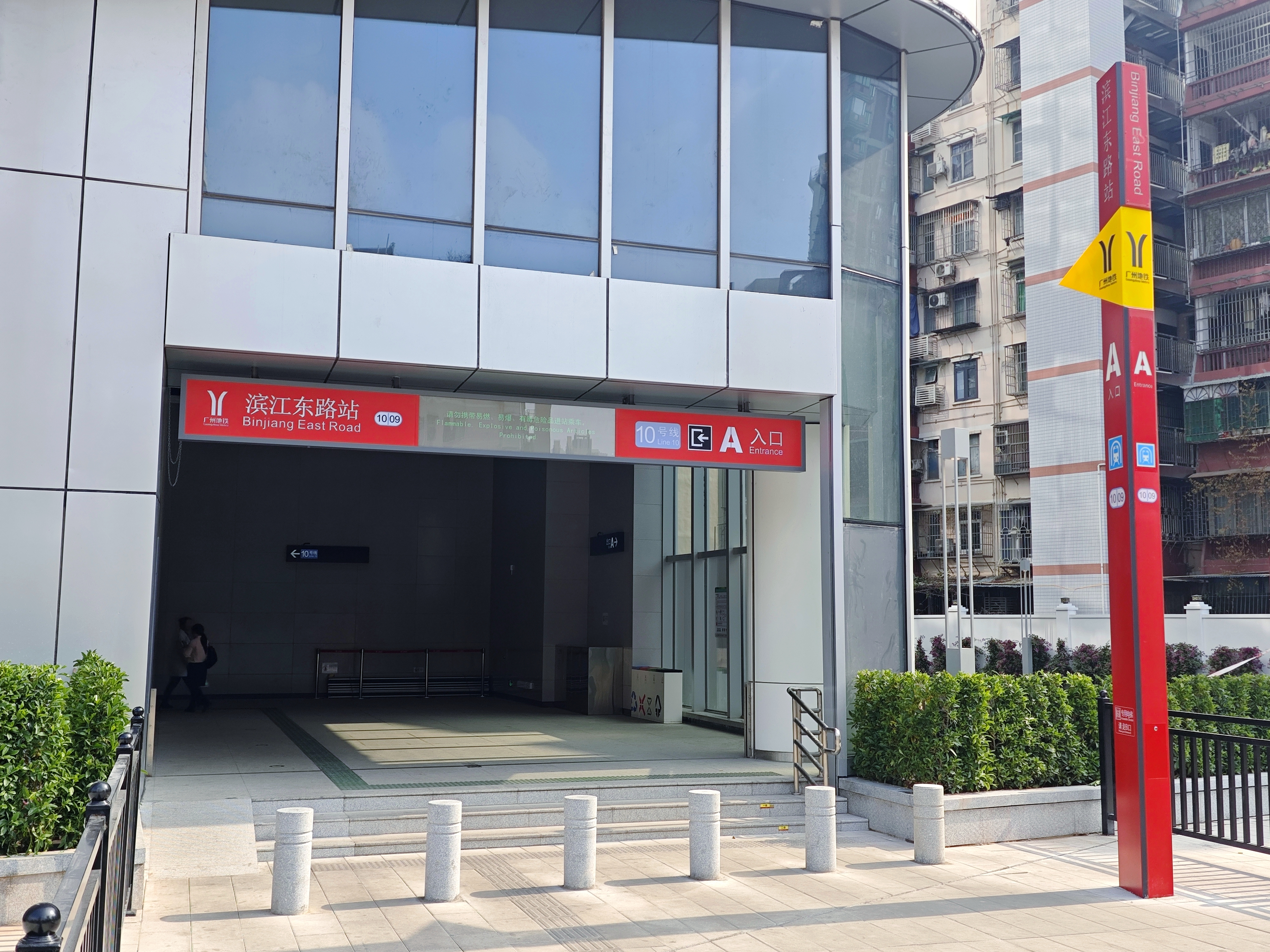
Entrance A

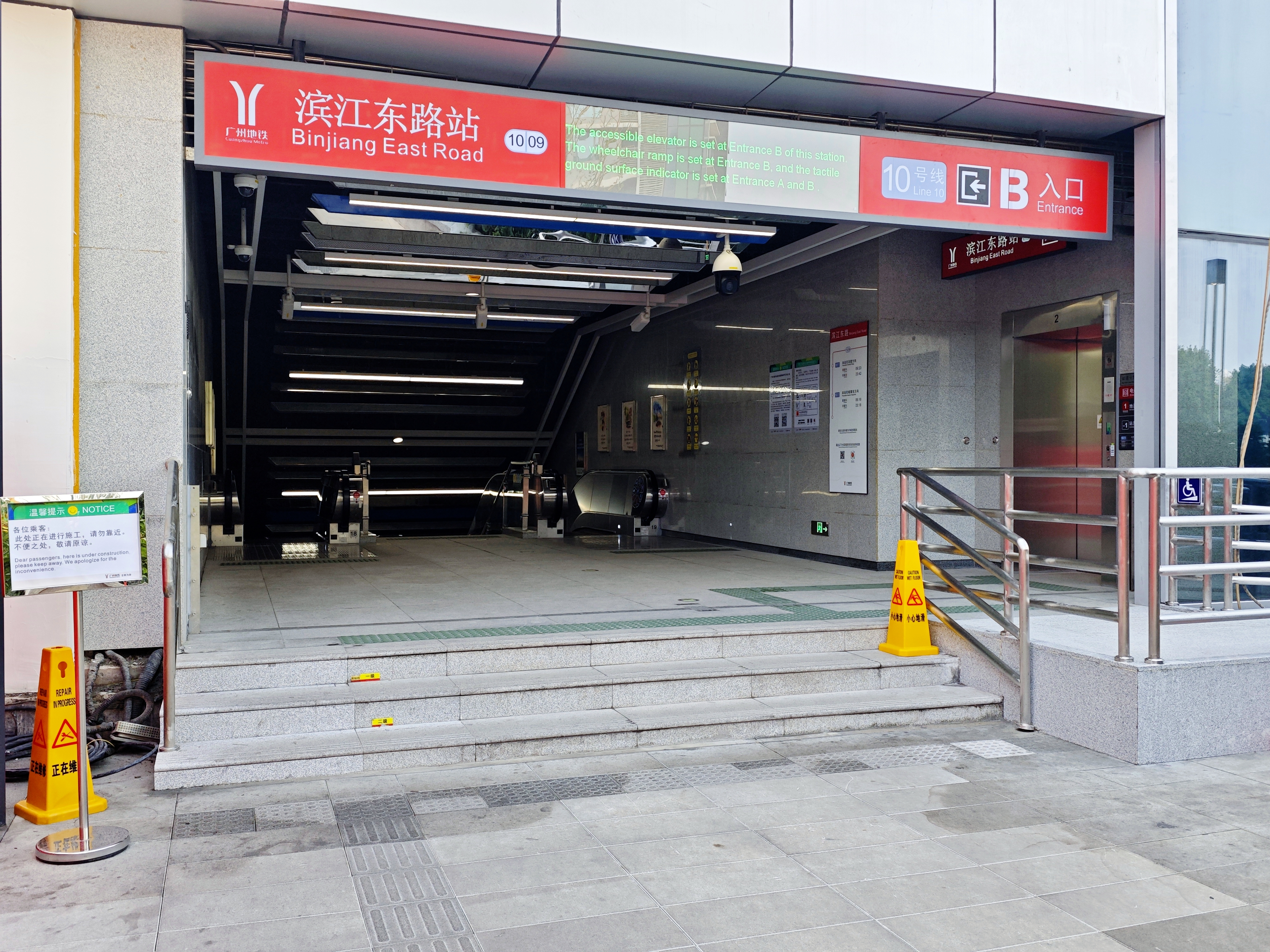
Entrance B

== History ==
Due to setbacks in land acquisition and demolition, construction at the station, located on the now closed site of the Pearl River Swimming Ground Bus Terminal, was postponed until 1 October 2020, and on 16 July 2021, the intersection of Binjiang East Road and Yile Road was also closed for construction. This station is the last station on Line 10 to start construction, not accounting for the Shuqian Road station, which has been cancelled.

The station completed its diaphragm wall enclosure construction on 7 December 2021. The base slab was sealed on 31 May 2022, and the roof slab was sealed on 8 April 2023. In March 2025, the station completed the “three rights” transfer.

During planning and construction, this station was called Binjiang East Road station. In April 2025, the Guangzhou Municipal Transportation Bureau announced the preliminary station names for Line 10, and the station is planned to continue to use the name Binjiang East Road. However, as Binjiang East Road is about 4 kilometres (2.5 mi) long, many people suggested naming it after the nearby landmark and bus stop, "Pearl River Swimming Pool. In the end, the authorities did not adopt the suggestion, citing a lack of naming clarity, and the station name Binjiang East Road was retained.

The station opened on 29 June 2025.

== Future expansion ==
Line 28 was originally planned to stop at Binjiang East Road, and transfer tunnels and a platform was reserved when Line 10 was built. However, in the latest plan, the Binjiang East Road Station of Line 28 was cancelled. Many people suggested that the station should be retained, or converted into a reserved station in the same way as the Pujun Beilu station on the Foshan Metro's Guangfo line.
