= Sun Yat-sen University South Gate station =

Guangzhou Metro Line 10 station

Sun Yat-sen University South Gate 中大南门
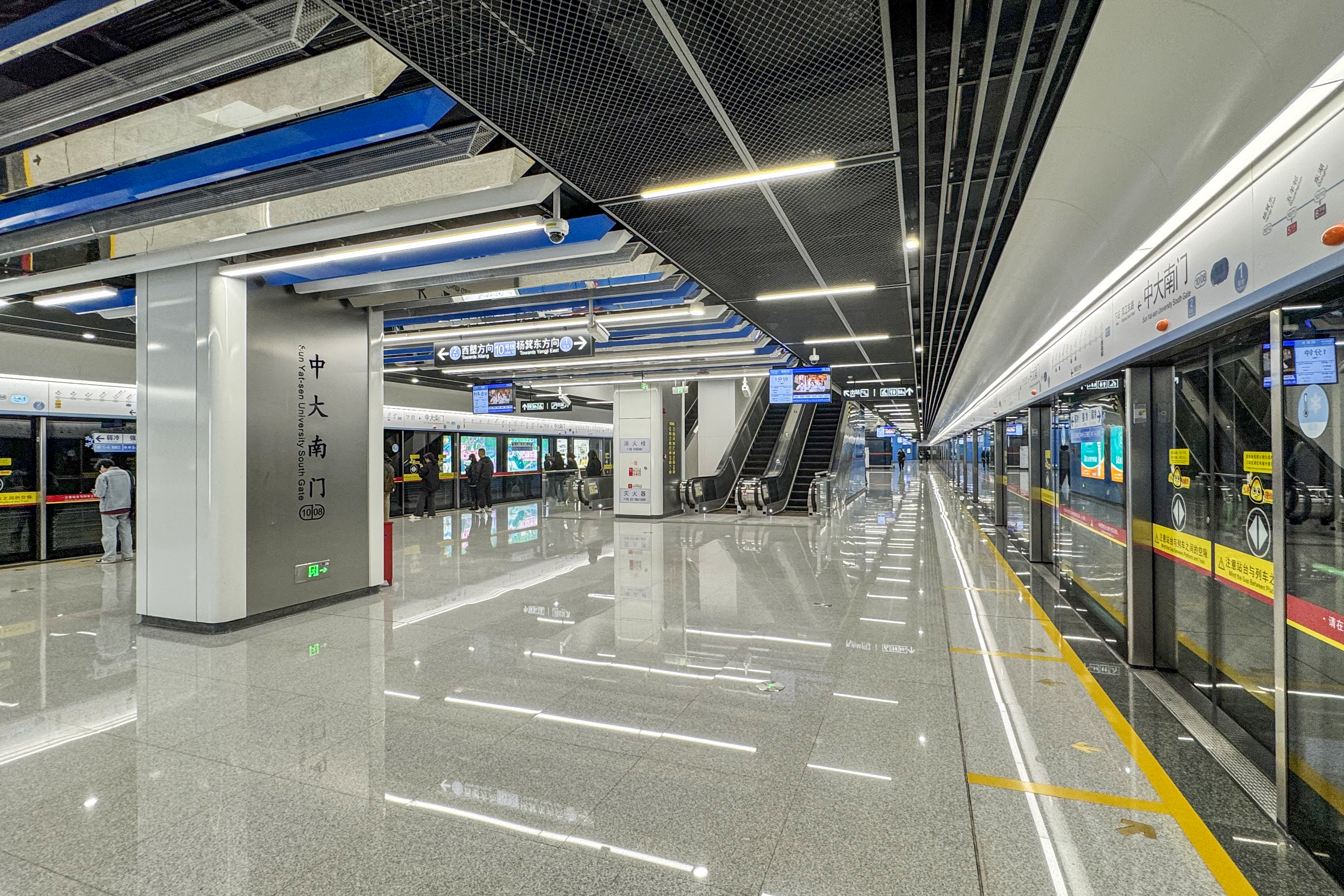
- Platform 1

Chinese name
- Simplified Chinese: 中大南门站
- Traditional Chinese: 中大南門站
Transcriptions
Standard Mandarin
- Hanyu Pinyin: Zhōngdà Nánmén Zhàn
Yue: Cantonese
- Yale Romanization: Jūngdaai Nàahmmùhn Jaahm
- Jyutping: Zung^{1}daai^{6} Naam^{4}mun^{4} Zaam^{6}

General information
- Location: Intersection of Ruikang Road (瑞康路) and Jinfang Road (金纺路), Xingang Subdistrict; Haizhu District, Guangzhou, Guangdong; China
- Coordinates: 23.0920°N 113.2910°E
- Operator: Guangzhou Metro Co. Ltd.
- Line: Line 10
- Platforms: 2 (1 island platform)
- Tracks: 2

Construction
- Structure type: Underground
- Accessible: Yes

Other information
- Station code: 1008

History
- Opened: 29 December 2025 (7 months ago)

Services
Preceding station	Guangzhou Metro	Following station
Wufeng towards Xilang	Line 10	Binjiang East Road towards Yangji East
Location

Sun Yat-sen University South Gate station (simplified Chinese: 中大南门站; traditional Chinese: 中大南門站; Jyutping: zung^{1} daai^{6} naam^{4} mun^{4} zaam^{6}; Cantonese Yale: Jūngdaai Nàahmmùhn Jaahm) is a station on Line 10 of the Guangzhou Metro. It is located underground under the intersection of Ruikang Road and Jinfang Road in Guangzhou's Haizhu District. It opened on 29 December 2025.

== Station layout ==
This station is a three-storey underground station. The ground level is the exit, and it is surrounded by Ruikang Road, Suifa Garden, Guangzhou International Textile City, Guangzhou Yangtze River International Textile City and other nearby buildings. The first floor is the concourse, the second floor is the equipment floor, and the third floor is the platform for Line 10.

G	-	Exits
L1; Concourse	Lobby	Ticket Machines, Customer Service, Shops, Police Station, Security Facilities; Reserved area for future transfer passage towards Line 8 Sun Yat-sen University station
L2	Mezzanine	Station Equipment
L3; Platforms	Platform 1	10 towards Xilang (Wufeng)
L3; Platforms	Island platform, doors will open on the left (Toilets, Nursery)
L3; Platforms	Platform 2	10 towards Yangji East (Binjiang East Road)

=== Concourse ===
There are automatic ticket machines and an AI customer service center at the concourse. There are elevators, escalators, and stairs in the fare-paid area for passengers to reach the platform.

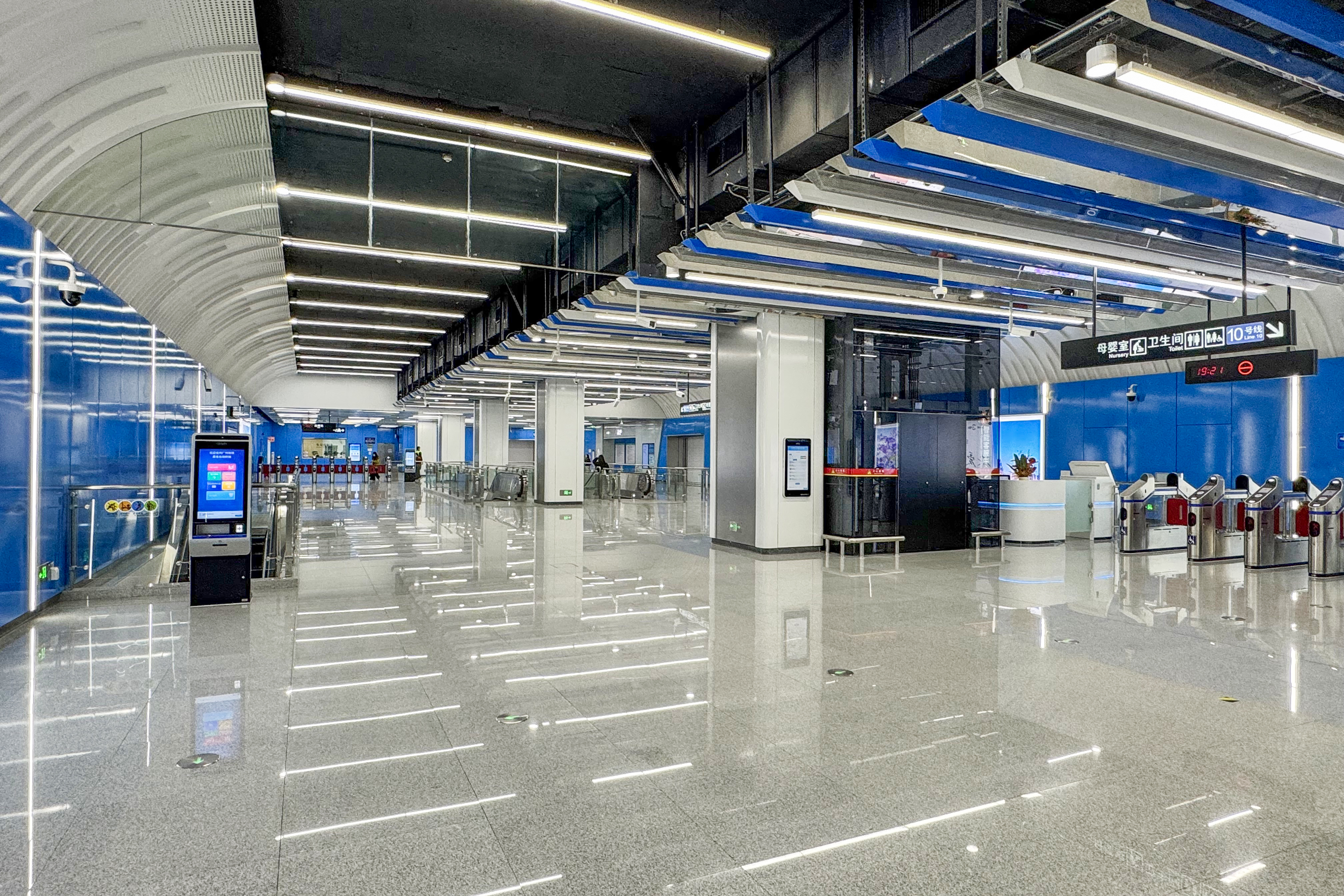
Concourse

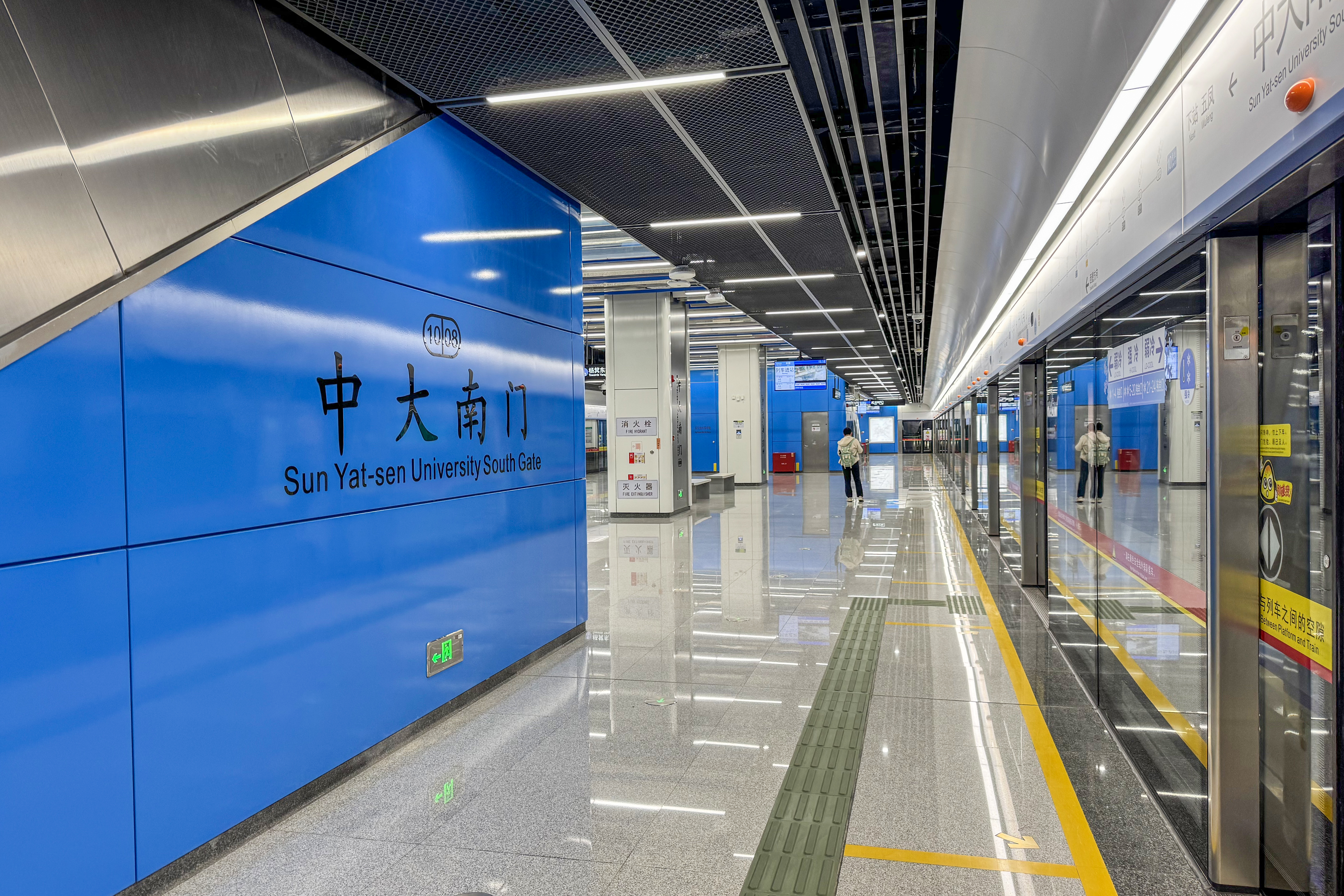
Platform 2

=== Platform ===
The station has an island platform located under Ruikang Road.

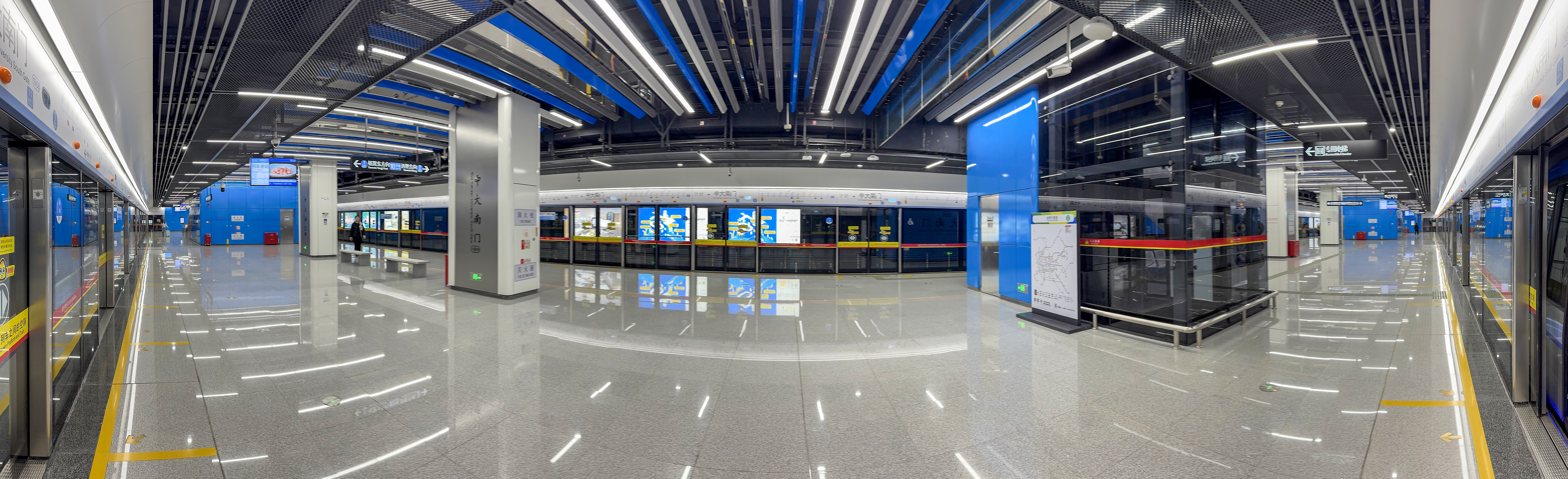
Platform panorama

=== Entrances/exits ===
The station has 2 points of entry/exit situated on Ruikang Road. Exit B is equipped with an elevator.

- A: Ruikang Road, Guangdong Industry Polytechnic University, 8 Sun Yat-sen University station Entrance/Exit D
- B: Ruikang Road
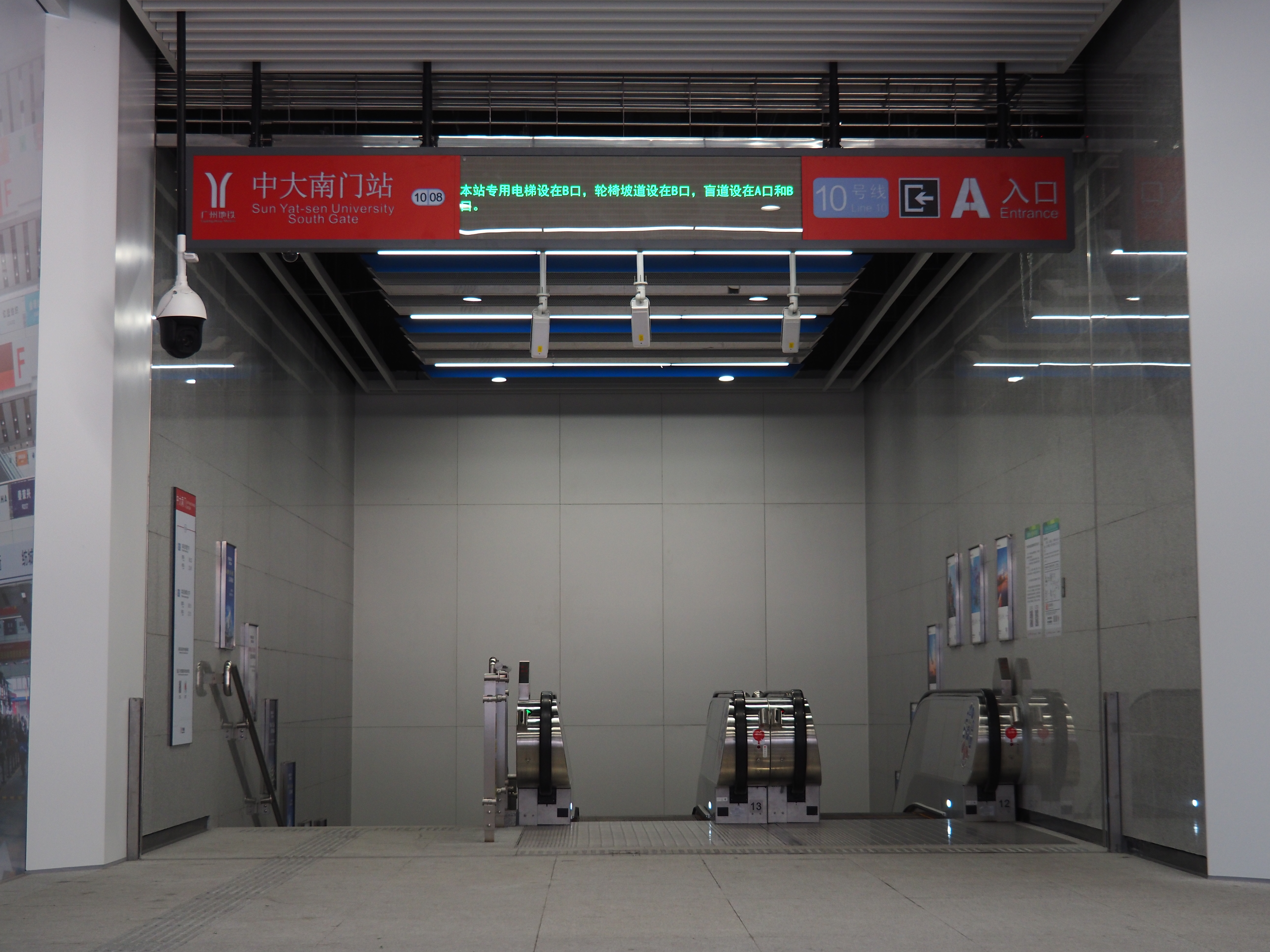
Exit A

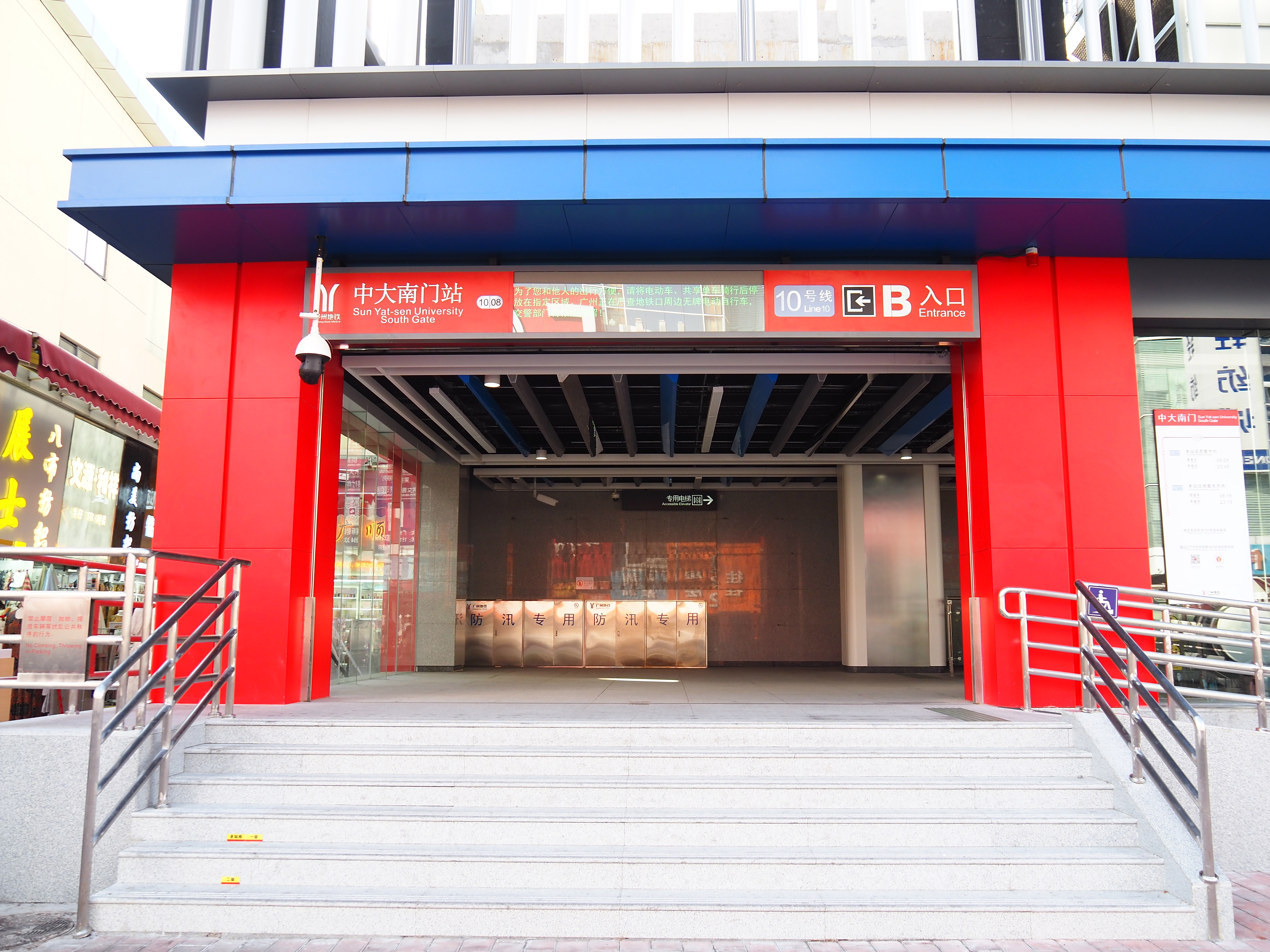
Exit B

== History ==
The station was first proposed in 2010, as part of Line 10 in the urban rail transportation network plan, to be located in front of the south gate of Sun Yat-sen University, to the east of the Line 8 station. Originally, the station have the same name as the Line 8 station—Sun Yat-sen University station. When Line 10 was officially established in 2017, the station was renamed Sun Yat-Sen University South Gate station. During the construction and preliminary design stage of Line 10, the location of the station was set at the intersection of Ruikang Road and Jinfang Road. As this was around 500m from the Line 8 station, the proposed transfer passage between the two stations was cancelled.

The line was approved as proposed by the Guangzhou Development and Reform Commission in January 2018. However it was noted that this station, along with another (Shuqian Road station), had been changed from interchange stations to non-interchange stations, and that every effort should be made to provide interchanges at these stations, to enhance the accessibility of the entire network. Station construction started in February 2020.

In an interview with the media in October 2020, Guangzhou Metro stated that it was still studying the issue of an interchange with Line 8. By the end of the month, it had been concluded a transfer passage would not be built, however there would be a reservation left for one to be built in the future.

As the line neared completion in May 2025, it was revealed that due to delays associated with land acquisition, demolition and local conditions, Exit D, No. 1 wind shaft and the emergency exits were still under construction. As such, the station would not open with the rest of the line and trains would pass through without stopping. In late November 2025, Exit B and ancillary facilities were completed, and the station entered the operation and commissioning stage in December the same year. On 29 December 2025, the station officially opened.
