= Shipaiqiao station =

Guangzhou Metro station

Coordinates: 23.1333°N 113.3317°E

Shipaiqiao 石牌桥
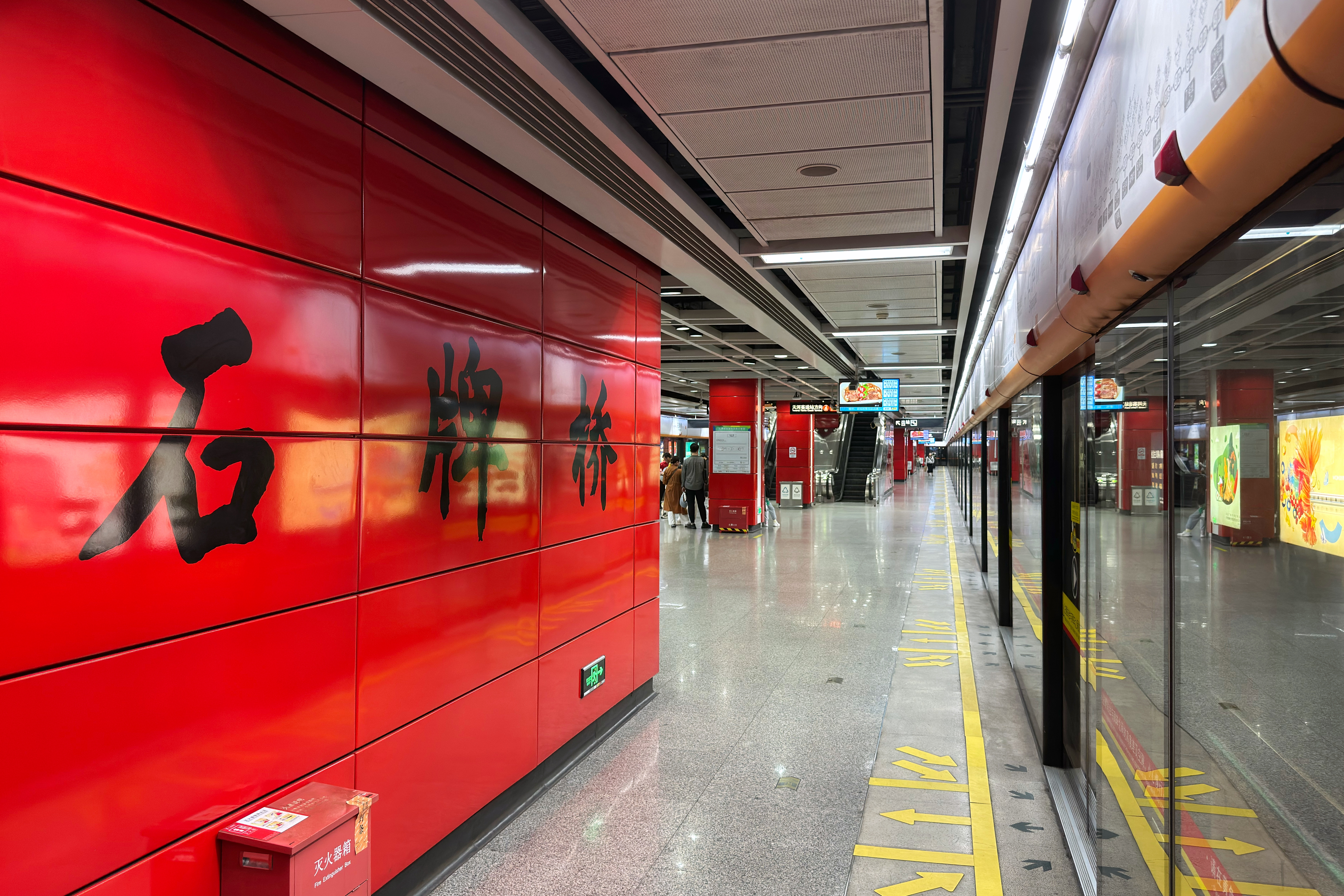
- Platform 2

Chinese name
- Simplified Chinese: 石牌桥站
- Traditional Chinese: 石牌橋站
- Literal meaning: Shipai Bridge Station
Transcriptions
Standard Mandarin
- Hanyu Pinyin: Shípáiqiáo Zhàn
Yue: Cantonese
- Yale Romanization: Sehkpàaihkìuh Jaahm
- Jyutping: Sek^{6}paai^{4}kiu^{4} Zaam^{6}
- Hong Kong Romanization: Shek Pai Kiu station

General information
- Location: Tianhe District, Guangzhou, Guangdong; China
- Operated by: Guangzhou Metro Co. Ltd.
- Lines: Line 3; Line 10 (future)
- Platforms: 2 (1 island platform)

Construction
- Structure type: Underground
- Accessible: Yes

Other information
- Station code: 312

History
- Opened: 30 December 2006; 19 years ago

Services
Preceding station	Guangzhou Metro	Following station
Tiyu Xilu towards Haibang	Line 3	Gangding towards Tianhe Coach Terminal
Future services
Tianhe Road towards Xilang	Line 10	Gangding towards Tianhe Coach Terminal
Location

Shipaiqiao Station (simplified Chinese: 石牌桥站; traditional Chinese: 石牌橋站; Jyutping: sek^{6} paai^{4} kiu^{4} zaam^{6}; Cantonese Yale: Sehk pàaih kìuh Jaahm) is a station of Line 3 of the Guangzhou Metro. It started operations on 30 December 2006. It is located in Tianhe District, underneath Tianhe Road between East Tianhe Road and East Tiyu Road.

== Station layout ==
G	-	Exit
L1; Concourse	Lobby	Customer Service, Shops, Vending machines, ATMs
L1; Concourse	Pedestrian Passageway	Pedestrian passageway to GBRT, TaiKoo Hui and One Link Walk
L2; Platforms	Platform 1	3 towards Haibang (Tiyu Xilu)
L2; Platforms	Island platform, doors will open on the left
L2; Platforms	Platform 2	3 towards Tianhe Coach Terminal (Gangding)

== Exits ==
Exit number	Exit location
Exit A	Tianhe Lu
Exit B	Tianhe Lu
Exit D	Tianhe Lu
Exit	Tianhe Lu, GBRT

== Around the station ==
- TaiKoo Hui
