= Gangding station =

Guangzhou Metro station

Coordinates: 23.13506°N 113.34011°E

Gangding 岗顶
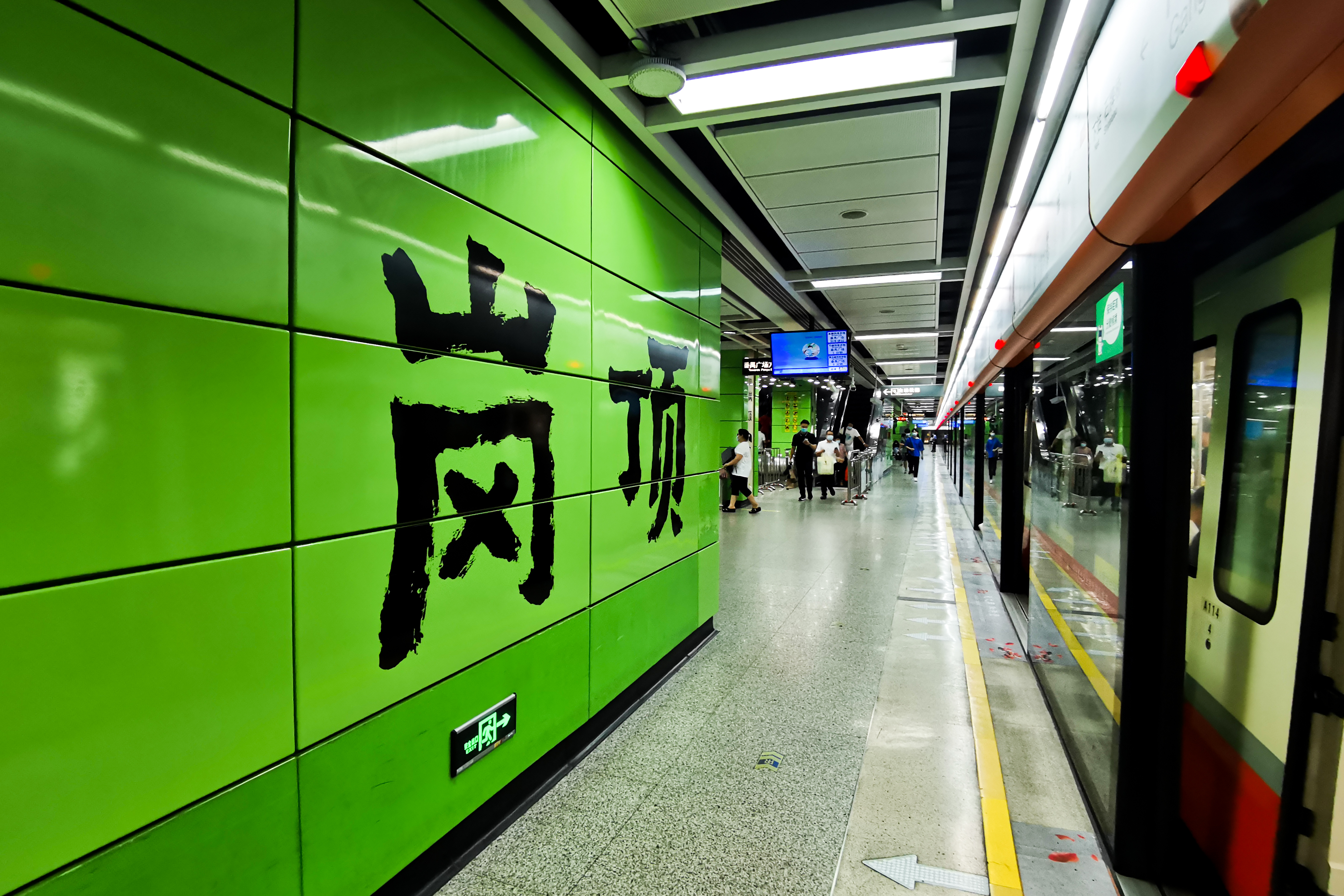

Chinese name
- Simplified Chinese: 岗顶站
- Traditional Chinese: 崗頂站
Transcriptions
Standard Mandarin
- Hanyu Pinyin: Gǎngdǐng Zhàn
Yue: Cantonese
- Yale Romanization: Gōngdíng Jaahm
- Jyutping: Gong^{1}ding^{2} Zaam^{6}
- Hong Kong Romanization: Kong Ting station

General information
- Location: Tianhe District, Guangzhou, Guangdong; China
- Operated by: Guangzhou Metro Co. Ltd.
- Lines: Line 3; Line 10 (future)
- Platforms: 2 (1 island platform)

Construction
- Structure type: Underground

History
- Opened: 30 December 2006; 19 years ago

Services
Preceding station	Guangzhou Metro	Following station
Shipaiqiao towards Haibang	Line 3	South China Normal University towards Tianhe Coach Terminal
Future services
Shipaiqiao towards Xilang	Line 10	South China Normal University towards Tianhe Coach Terminal
Location

Gangding station (simplified Chinese: 岗顶站; traditional Chinese: 崗頂站; Jyutping: gong^{1} ding^{2} zaam^{6}; Cantonese Yale: Gōngdíng Jaahm) is a station on Line 3 of the Guangzhou Metro. It started operation on 30 December 2006 and is located under Zhongshan Avenue West (中山大道西) in the Tianhe District of Guangzhou.

== Station layout ==
G	-	Exit
L1; Concourse	Lobby	Customer Service, Shops, Vending machines, ATMs
L2; Platforms	Platform 1	3 towards Haibang (Shipaiqiao)
L2; Platforms	Island platform, doors will open on the left
L2; Platforms	Platform 2	3 towards Tianhe Coach Terminal (South China Normal University)

== Exits ==
Exit number	Exit location
Exit A	Zhongshan Dadaoxi
Exit C	Zhongshan Dadaoxi
Exit D	Zhongshan Dadaoxi
