= Shuqian Road station =

Cancelled metro station in Guangzhou, China

~~Shuqian Road~~ ~~署前路~~

General information
- Location: North of Miaoqian Zhijie; Dongshan Subdistrict, Guangzhou, Yuexiu District, Guangzhou, Guangdong; China
- Line: ~~Line 10~~

Construction
- Structure type: Underground

Other information
- Status: Cancelled

Shuqian Road station (Chinese: 署前路站; Jyutping: cyu^{5} cin^{4} lou^{6} zaam^{6}) is a cancelled station of Line 10 of the Guangzhou Metro. It was planned to be built underground on the north side of Miaoqianzhi Street in Yuexiu District, near Dongshankou station. Due to the lack of transparency of the planning process and the site selection of Dongshan, the historical core area of Guangzhou, this site has caused controversy and attracted much attention.

== History ==
On March 15, 2017, the “Recent Construction Plan for Urban Rail Transit in Guangzhou (2016-2022)” submitted by the Guangdong Provincial Development and Reform Commission was approved by the National Development and Reform Commission, and the approval is in the construction planning period It has been adjusted to 2017–2023. The planning document was released with the approval, and a schematic diagram of the construction plan of the wired network was attached. In the schematic diagram, the new line routing, all stations and the nature of the transfer are marked, and the Shuqian Road Station is visible for the first time. This site was also mentioned in the public announcement of the second environmental impact assessment of Line 10. The feasibility study report and the entire environmental assessment report. The contents and schematic diagram of the "Planning" after the approval of the Guangzhou Metro on July 2, 2018 was also published on the Internet.

Among them, there is a special explanation in the entire environmental impact report published on June 14, 2018, indicating that the planning project should be close to the Xinhepu Historical and Cultural Protection Area, specially designed to avoid the above-mentioned areas to set up stations, and plan to use a combination of open and dark excavation Construction method, reduce the requisition and demolition in order to reduce the impact of the station on the block.
