= Wufeng station =

Guangzhou Metro Line 10 and Line 11 station

Wufeng 五凤
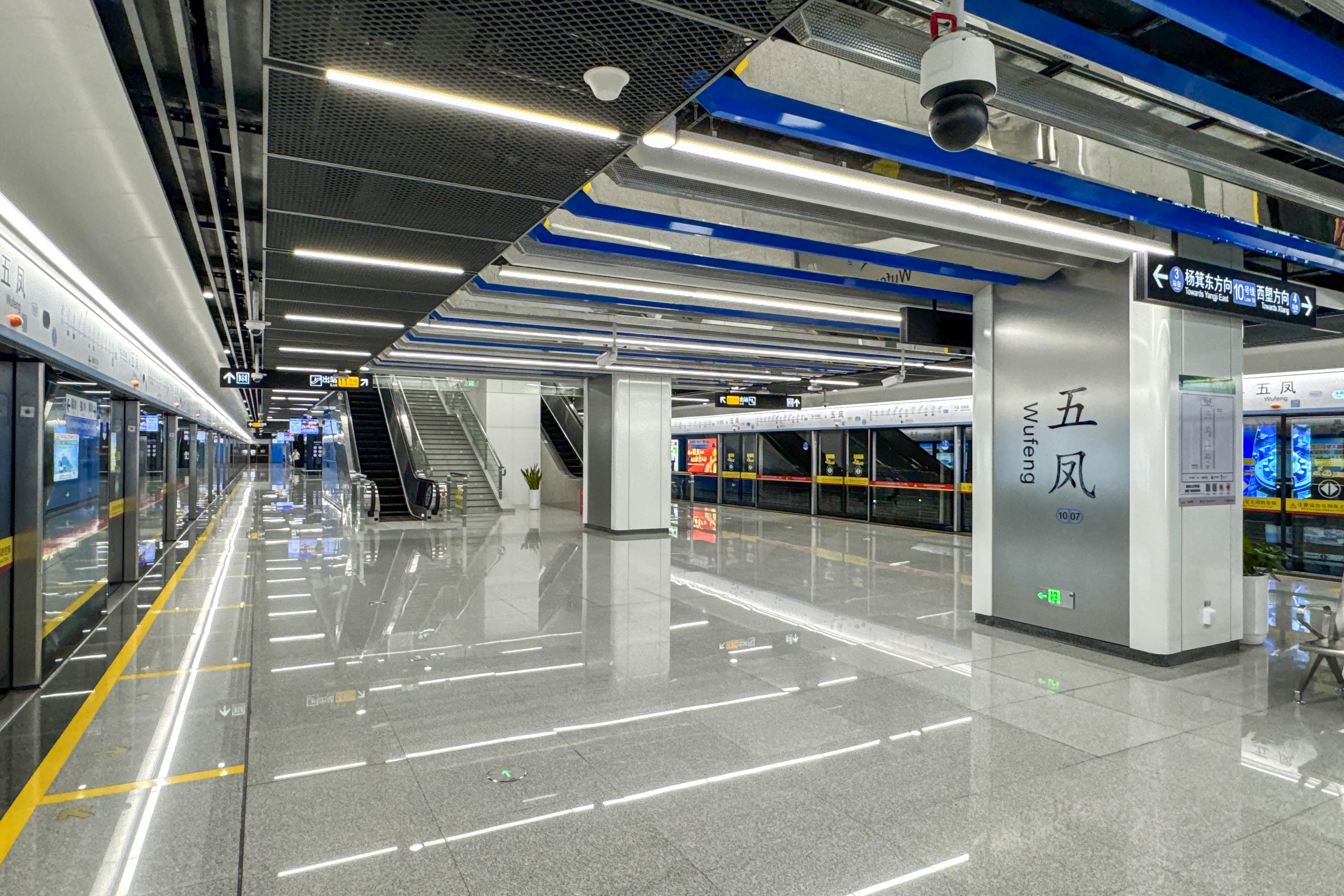
- Line 10 platform

Chinese name
- Simplified Chinese: 五凤站
- Traditional Chinese: 五鳳站
Transcriptions
Standard Mandarin
- Hanyu Pinyin: Wǔfèng Zhàn
Yue: Cantonese
- Yale Romanization: Ńgfuhng Jaahm
- Jyutping: Ng^{5}fung^{6} Zaam^{6}
- Hong Kong Romanization: Ng Fung station

General information
- Location: Intersection of Ruikang Road (瑞康路) and Yijing Road (逸景路), border of Ruibao and Fengyang Subdistricts; Haizhu District, Guangzhou, Guangdong; China
- Coordinates: 23°5′5.24″N 113°17′24.61″E
- Operator: Guangzhou Metro Co. Ltd.
- Lines: Line 10; Line 11
- Platforms: 4 (2 island platforms)
- Tracks: 4

Construction
- Structure type: Underground
- Accessible: Yes

Other information
- Station code: 1007 1127

History
- Opened: Line 11: 28 December 2024 (19 months ago); Line 10: 29 June 2025 (13 months ago)

Services
| Preceding station | Guangzhou Metro | Following station |
|---|---|---|
| Dongxiao South towards Xilang | Line 10 | Sun Yat-sen University South Gate towards Yangji East |
| Yijing Road Outer Circle | Line 11 | Jiangtai Road Inner Circle |
Location

Wufeng Station (simplified Chinese: 五凤站; traditional Chinese: 五鳳站; Jyutping: ng^{5} fung^{6} zaam^{6}; Cantonese Yale: Ńgfuhng Jaahm) is an interchange station between Line 10 and Line 11 of the Guangzhou Metro. The Line 11 station started operations on 28 December 2024. It is located underground at the intersection of Ruikang Road and Yijing Road in Haizhu District. The Line 10 station started operations on 29 June 2025.

== Station Layout ==
This station is three-storey underground station (with four sections). The ground level is the exit, and it is surrounded by Ruikang Road, Yijing Road, Guangzhou Yangtze River (China) Textile City, Chunyang Temple and other nearby buildings. The first floor is the concourse, the second floor is the equipment floor and the platform for Line 10, and the third floor is the platform for Line 11.

| G | - | Exits A, B, D |
| L1 | - | Reserved for underground commercial facilities |
| L2 | Lobby | Ticket Machines, Customer Service, Shops, Police Station, Security Facilities |
| L3; 10 Platforms | Line 11 Mezzanine | Station Equipment |
| L3; 10 Platforms | Platform 4 | 10 towards Xilang (Dongxiao South) |
| L3; 10 Platforms | Island platform, doors will open on the left (Toilets, Nursery) |
| L3; 10 Platforms | Platform 3 | 10 towards Yangji East (Sun Yat-sen University South Gate) |
| | Transfer level | Towards Lines 10 and 11 platforms |
| L4; 11 Platforms | Platform 2 | 11 Inner Circle (Jiangtai Road) |
| L4; 11 Platforms | Island platform, doors will open on the left (Toilets, Nursery) |
| L4; 11 Platforms | Platform 1 | 11 Outer Circle (Yijing Road) |

=== Concourse ===
The concourse of the station is equipped with electronic ticket vending machines and AI customer service centers. There are elevators, escalators and stairs in the fare-paid areas of Line 10 and Line 11 for passengers to access the platforms.

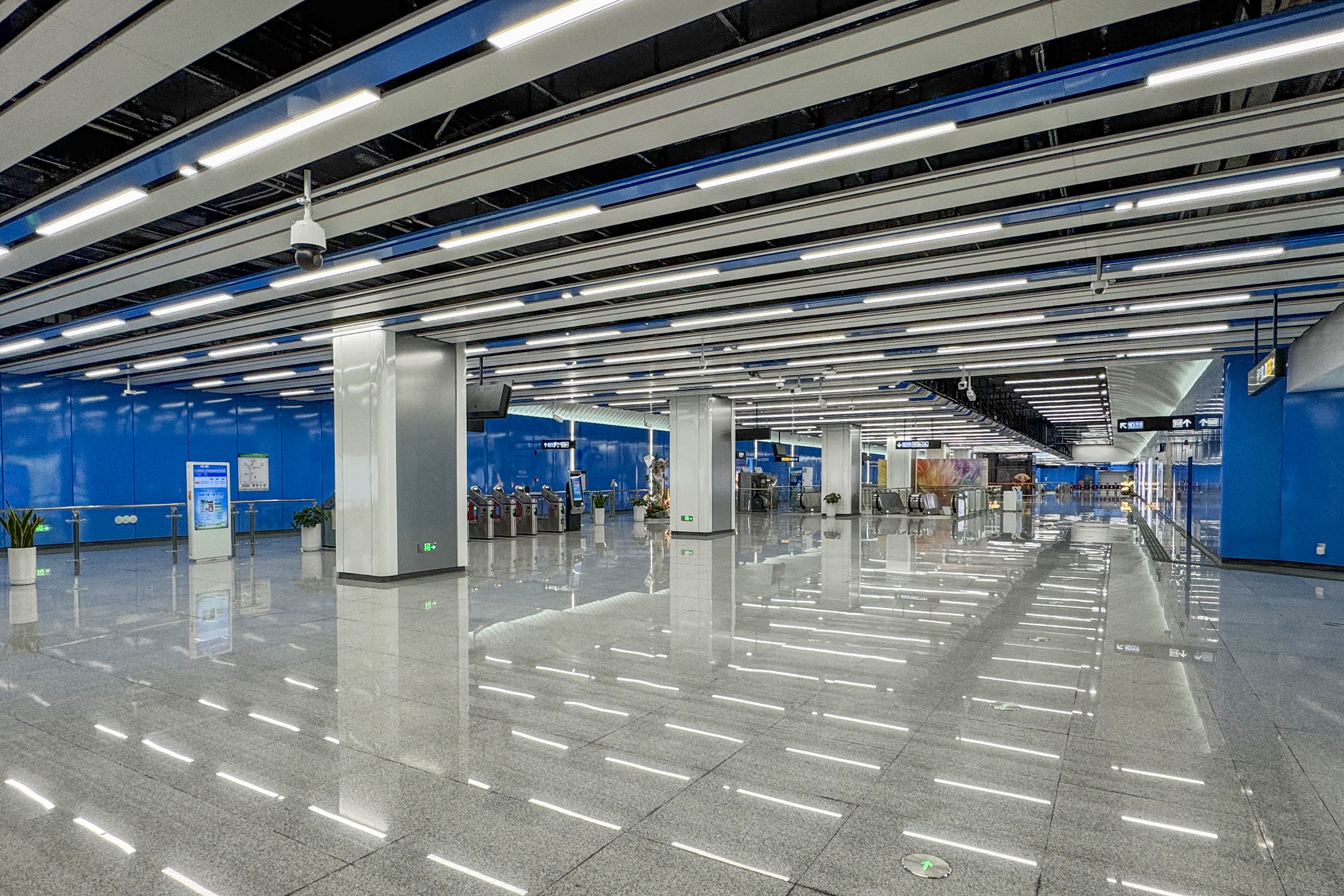
Line 10 concourse

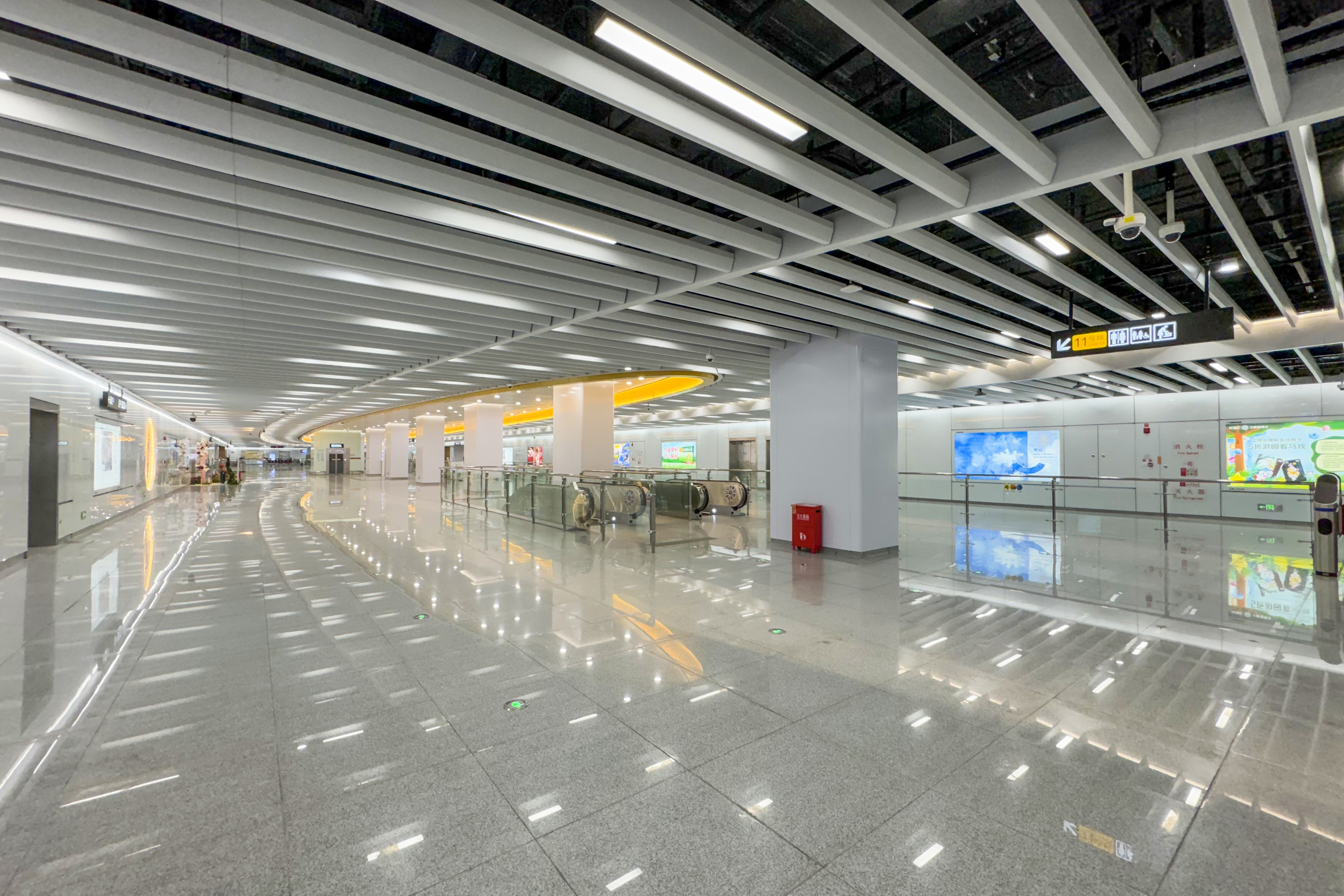
Line 11 concourse

=== Platforms ===
The station has an island platform each for Line 10 and Line 11. The Line 11 platform is located under Yijing Road on the third floor, and the Line 10 platform is located under Ruikang Road on the second floor. The platforms of the two lines roughly form an "L" shape. In terms of transfer, the two platforms are connected to the west end of the Line 11 platforms and the north end of the Line 10 platforms respectively through the transfer level mezzanine, allowing passengers to transfer between the two lines. Transfer is also available via the concourse.

The platforms of both lines of this station are equipped with toilets and a nursery room each, of which Line 10 is set at the station end facing Sun Yat-sen University South Gate, and Line 11 is set at the station end facing Yijing Road.

In addition, the Line 10 platform has a set of double storage lines at its southern end.

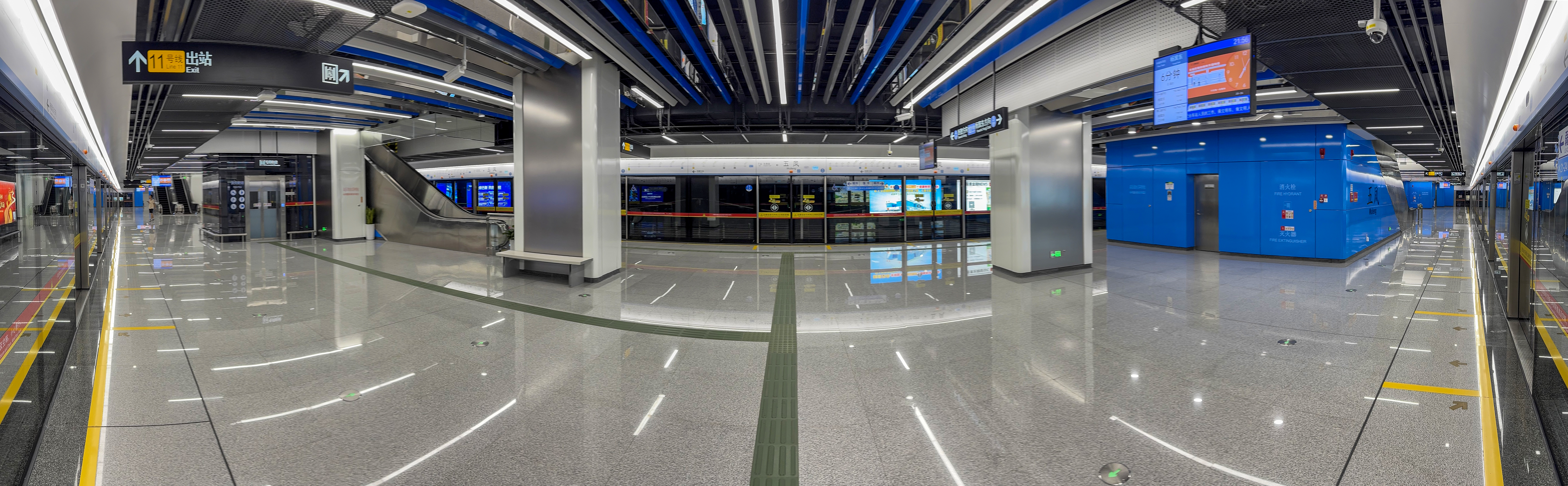
Line 10 platform panorama
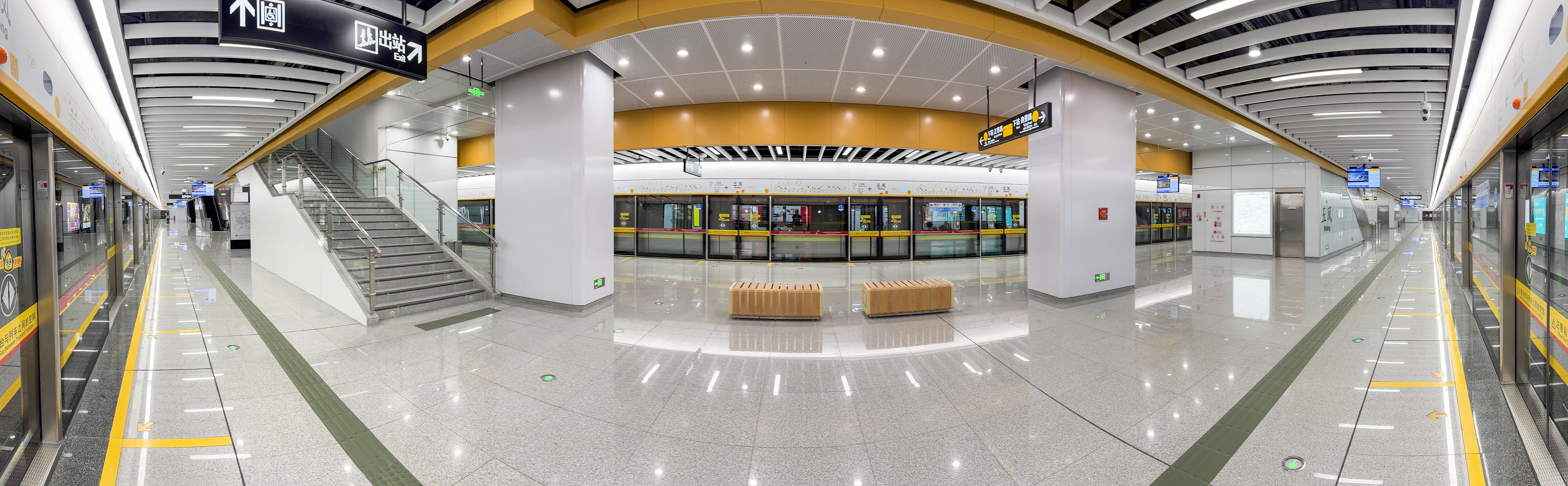
Line 11 platform panorama

=== Entrances/exits ===
The station has 4 points of entry/exit. Exits A, B and D opened with the station's initial opening, with Exit F opening when Line 10 opened. Exits B and F are equipped with elevators.

- A: Ruikang Road
- B: Yijing Road, Guangzhou Yangtze River (China) Textile City
- D: Yijing Road
- F: Ruikang Road, Chunyang Temple
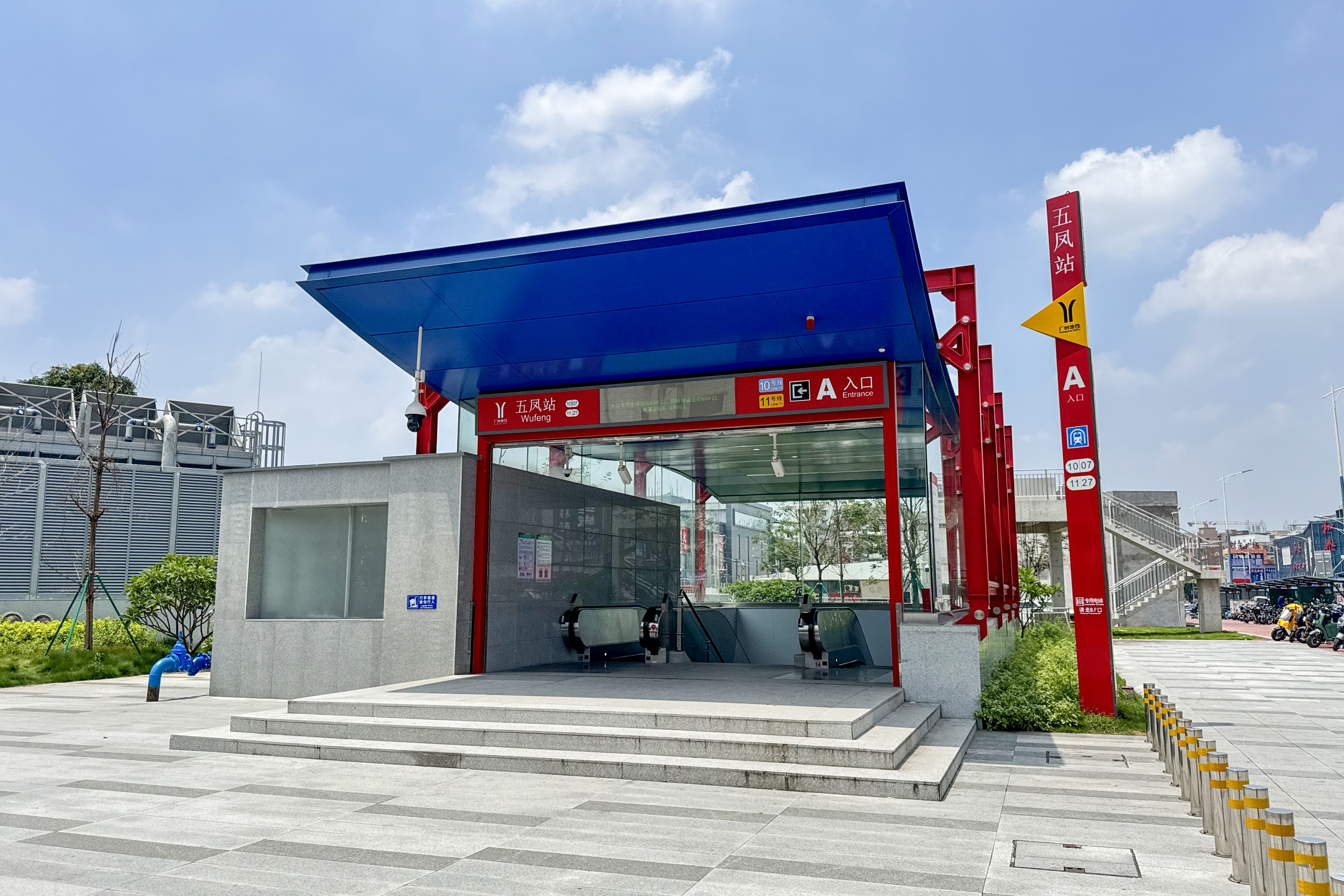
Entrance A

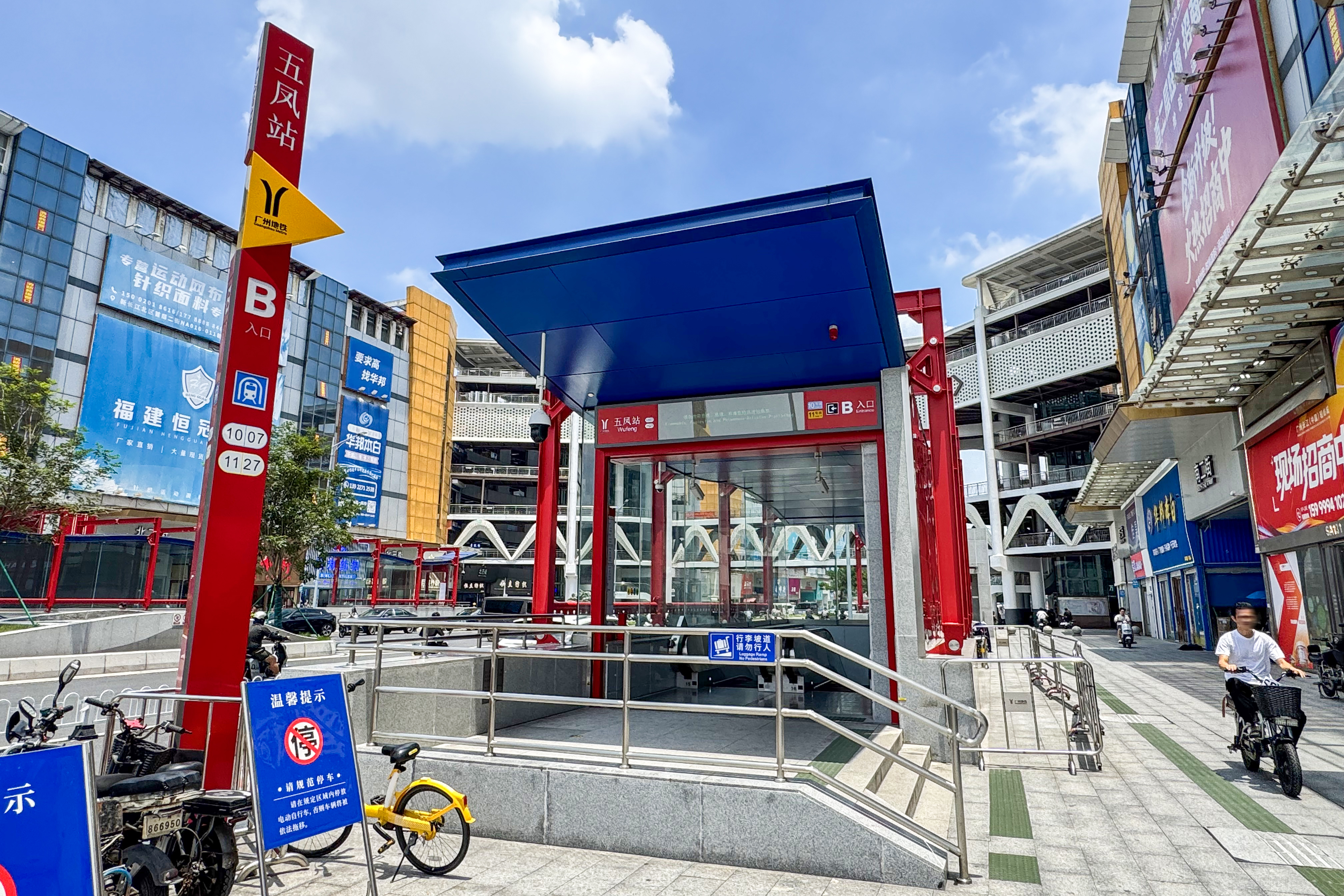
Entrance B

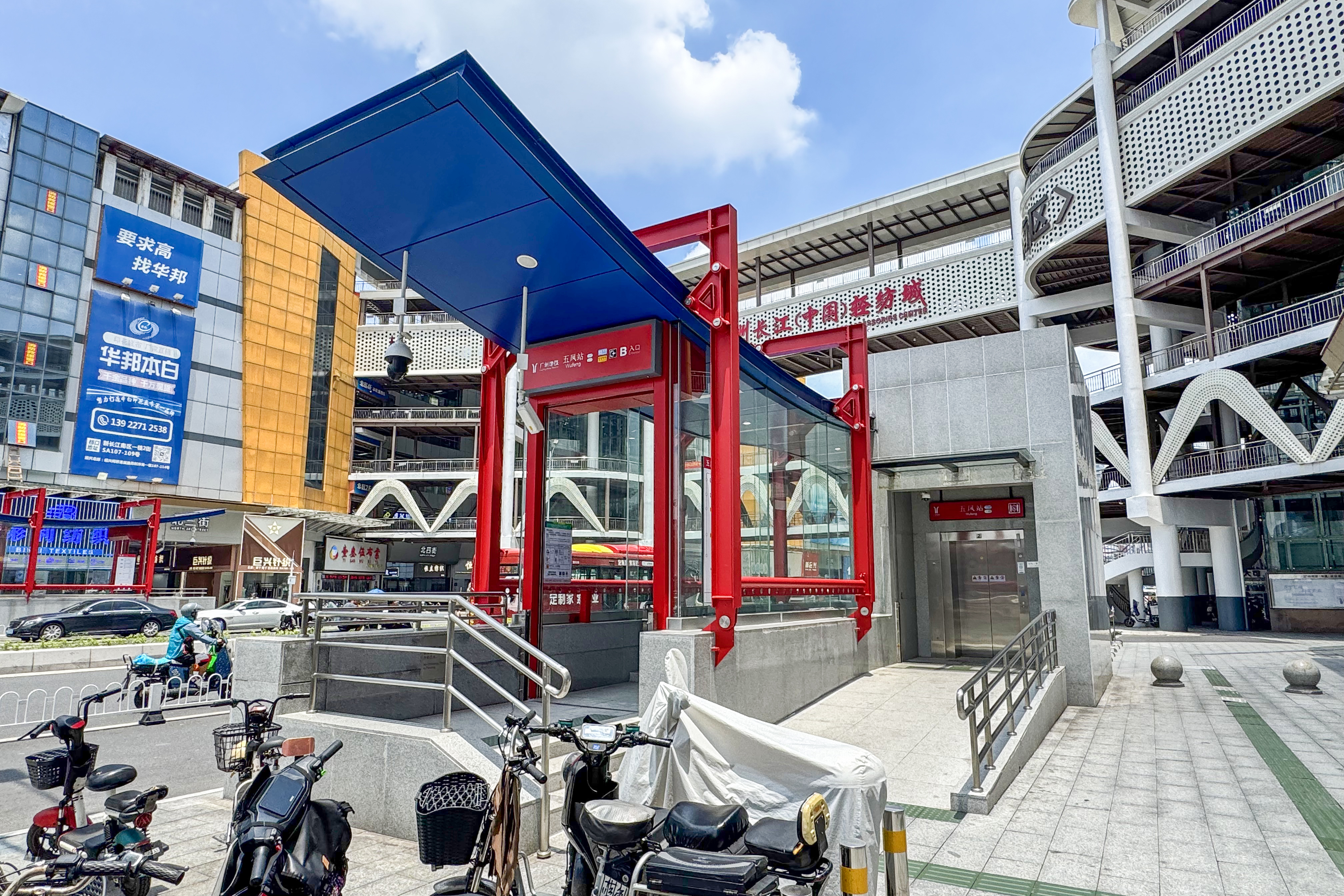
Stairs of Entrance B

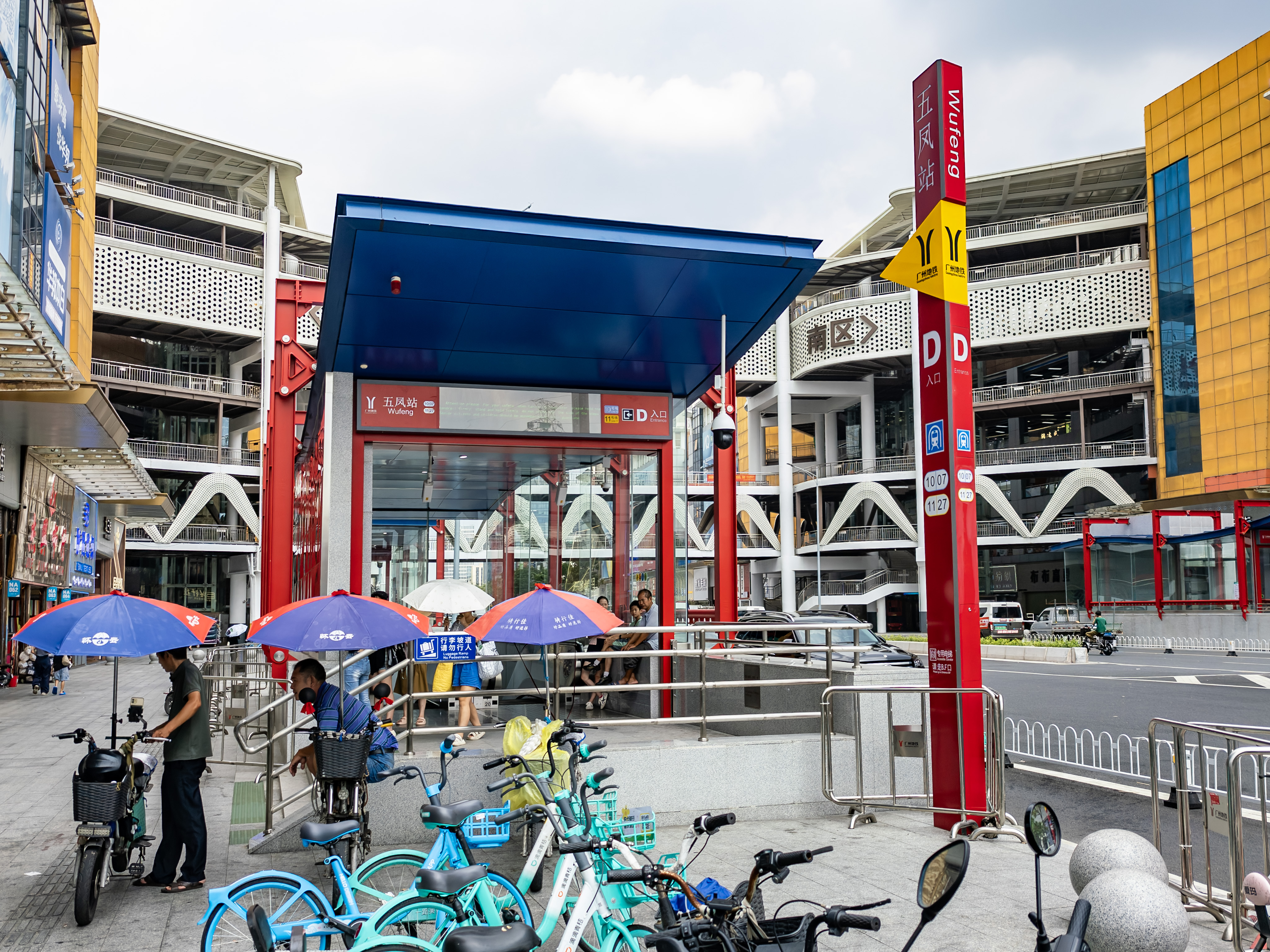
Entrance D

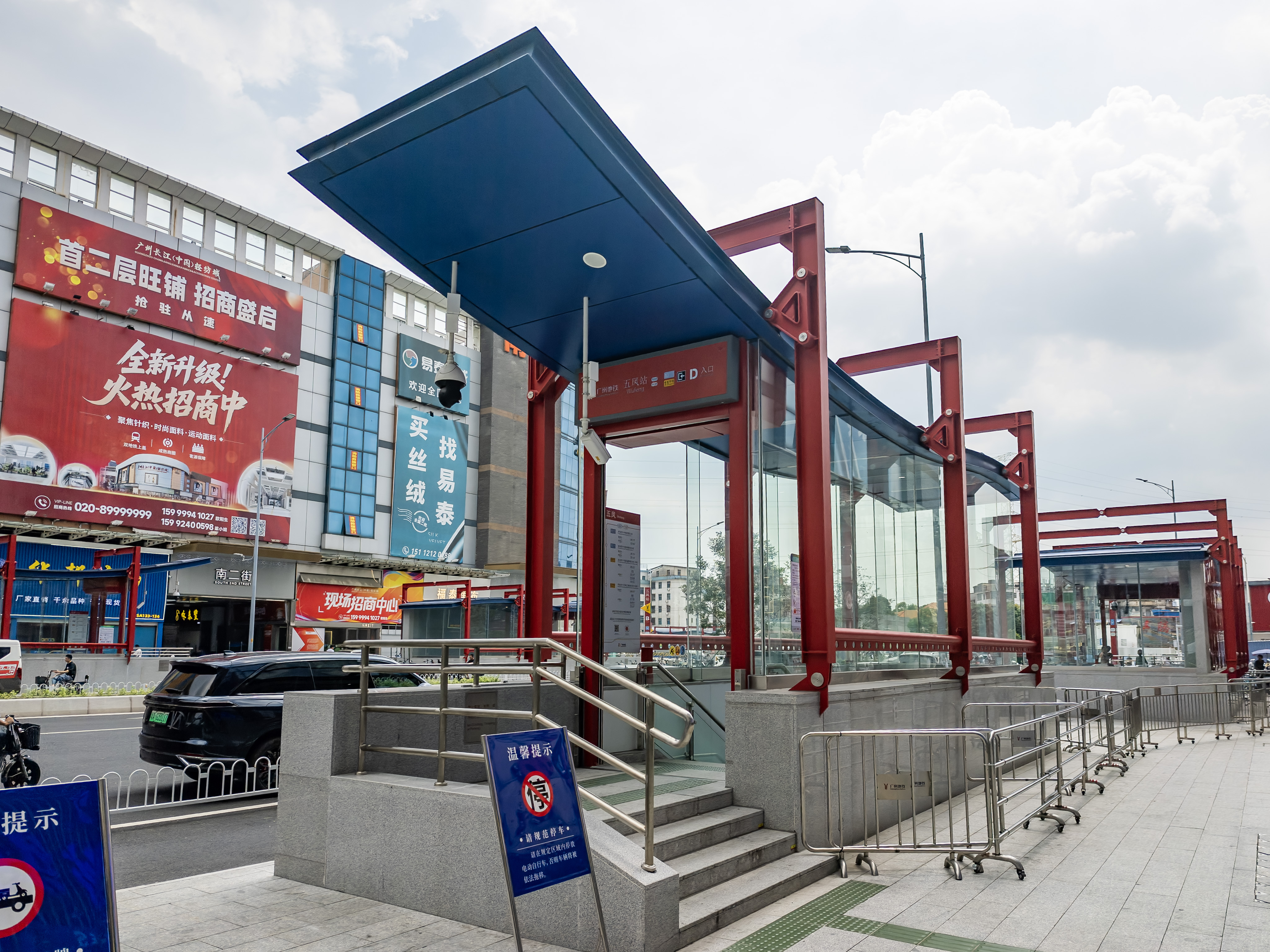
Stairs of Entrance D

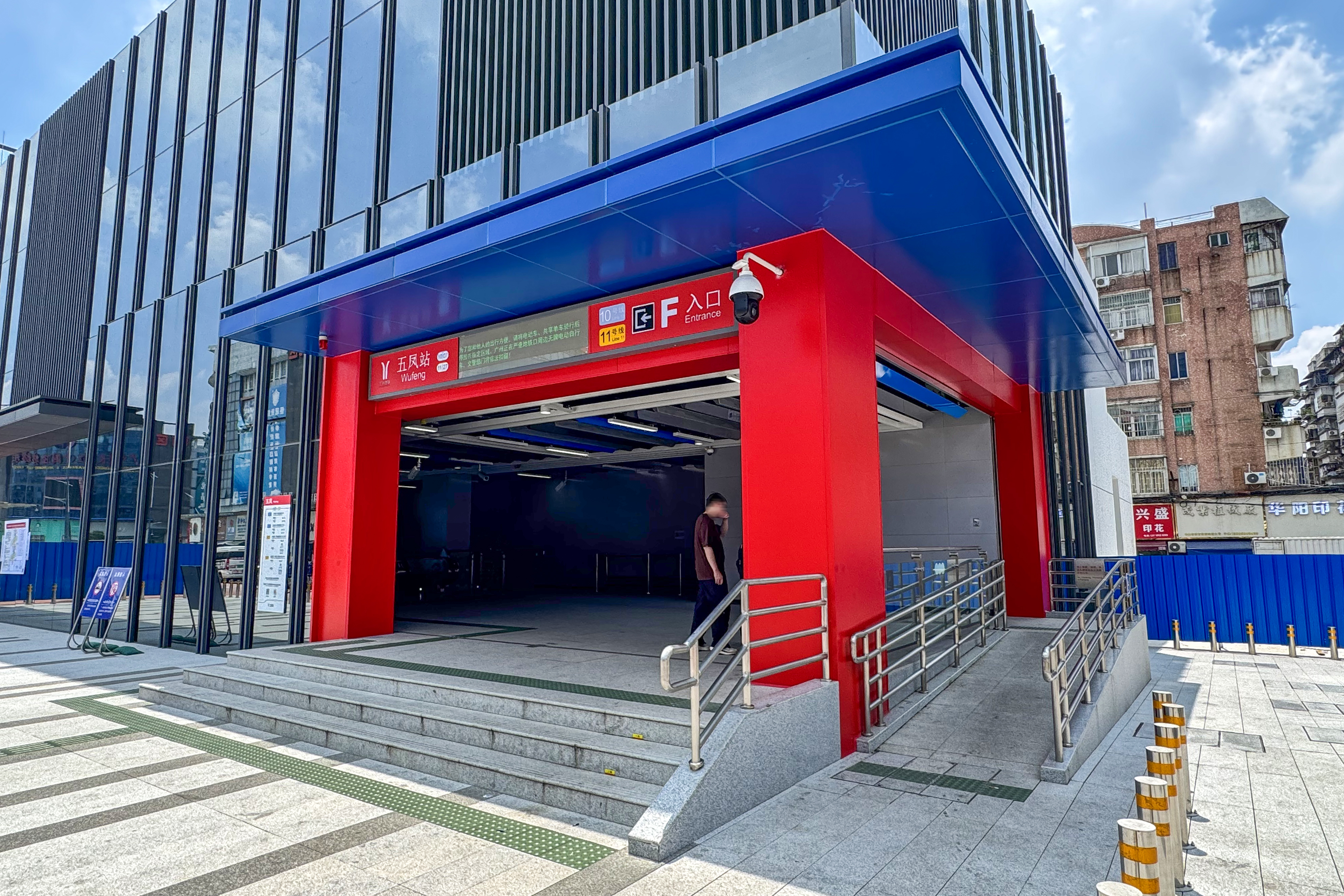
Entrance F

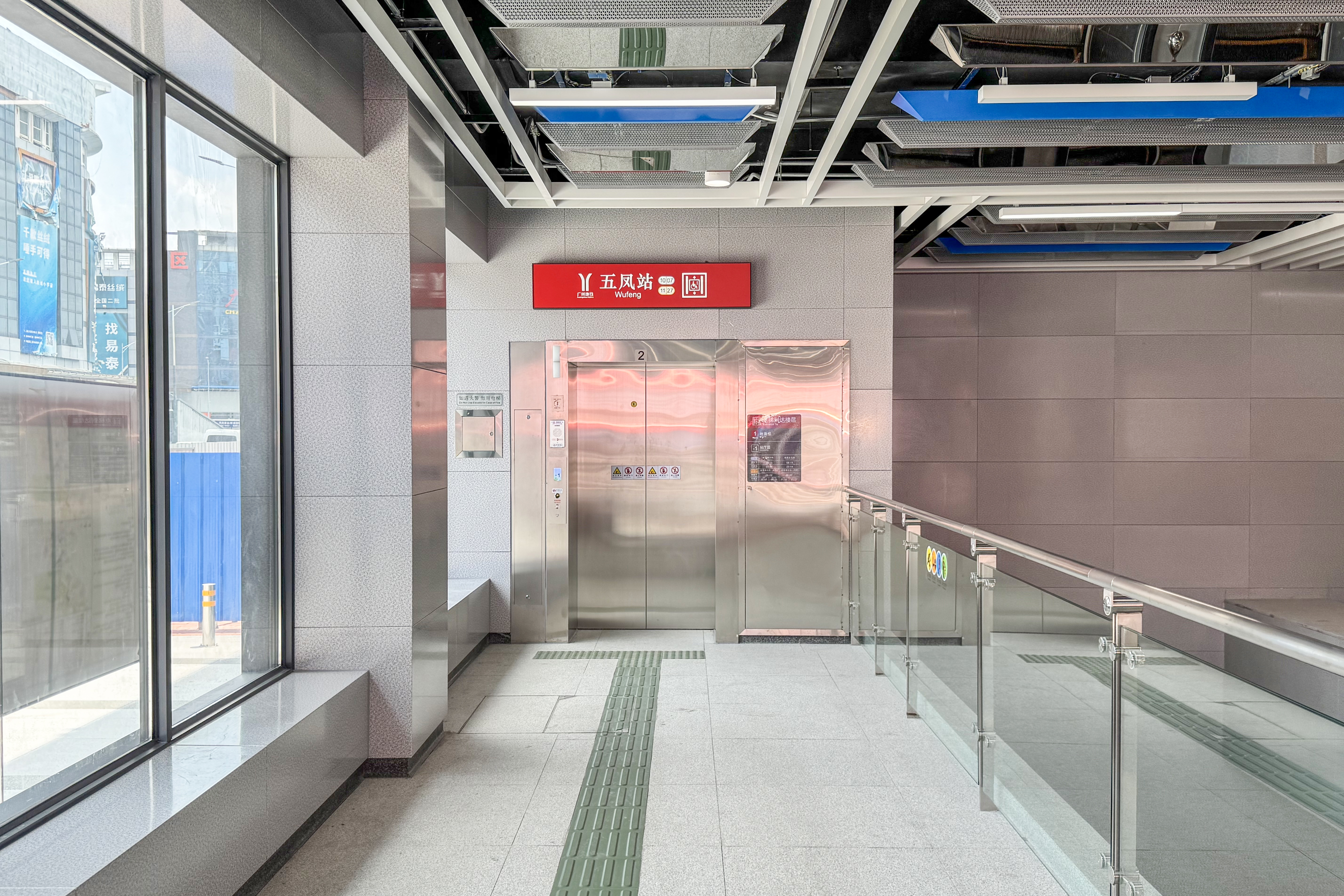
Elevator of Entrance F

== History ==
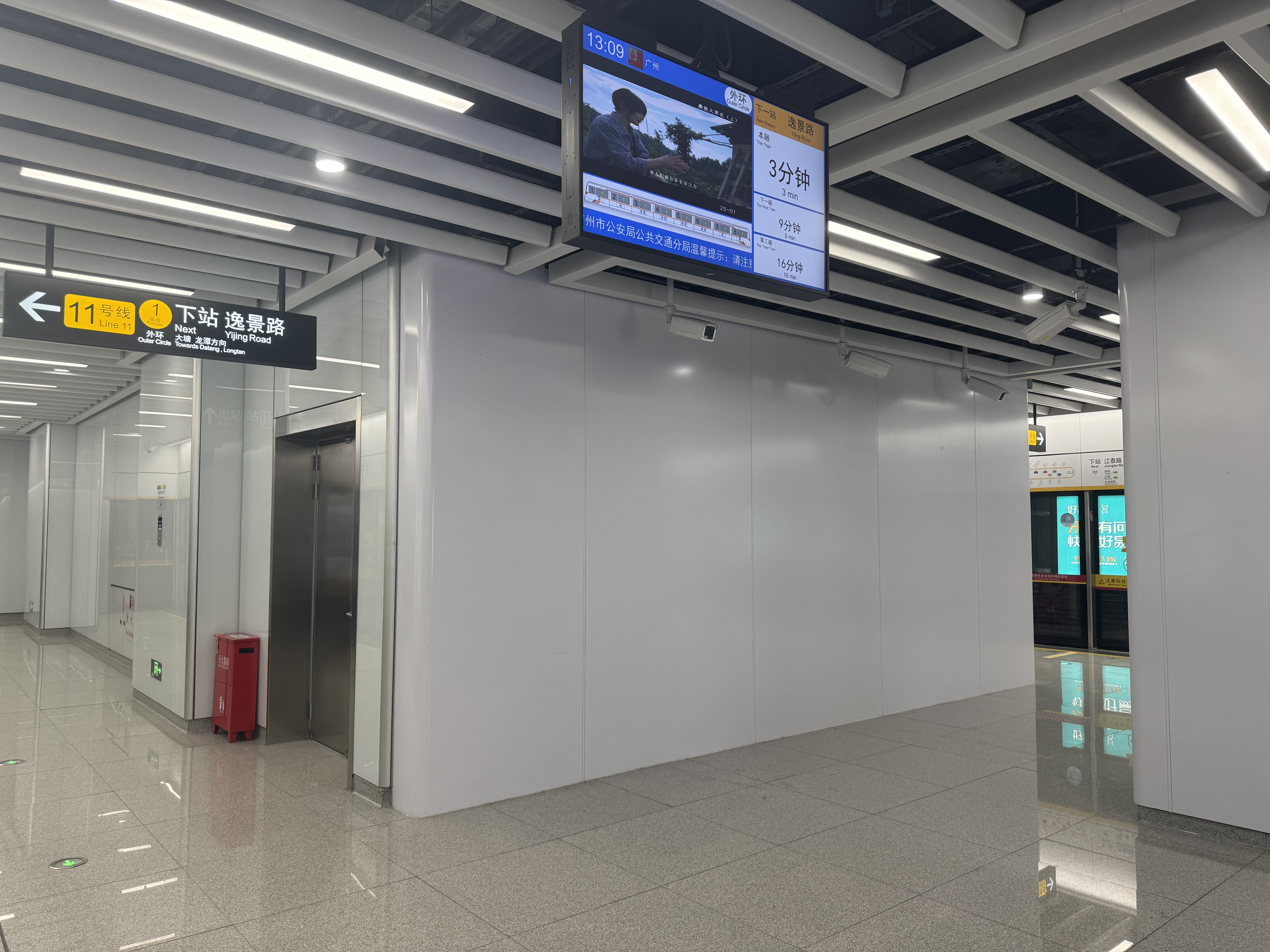
Transfer node of Line 10 reserved by the Line 11 platform in the station's initial opening, enclosed by a false wall

The station was called Textile City station at the beginning of planning and was renamed Wufeng station after the approval of Line 11.

Affected by the early expropriation and demolition, the Line 11 station was postponed to 2018 before it started the enclosure construction; The Line 10 station was also postponed, having its site only fenced in April 2019. The Line 11 station entered the main structure construction stage on 28 June 2022, and the main structure was topped out on 30 May 2023.

On 20 September 2024, the Line 11 station completed the "three rights" transfer. On 28 December, the station was put into use with the opening of Line 11.

On 30 December 2024, the Line 10 station completed the "three rights" transfer. On 29 June 2025, the platforms were put into use with the opening of Line 10.

== Gallery ==
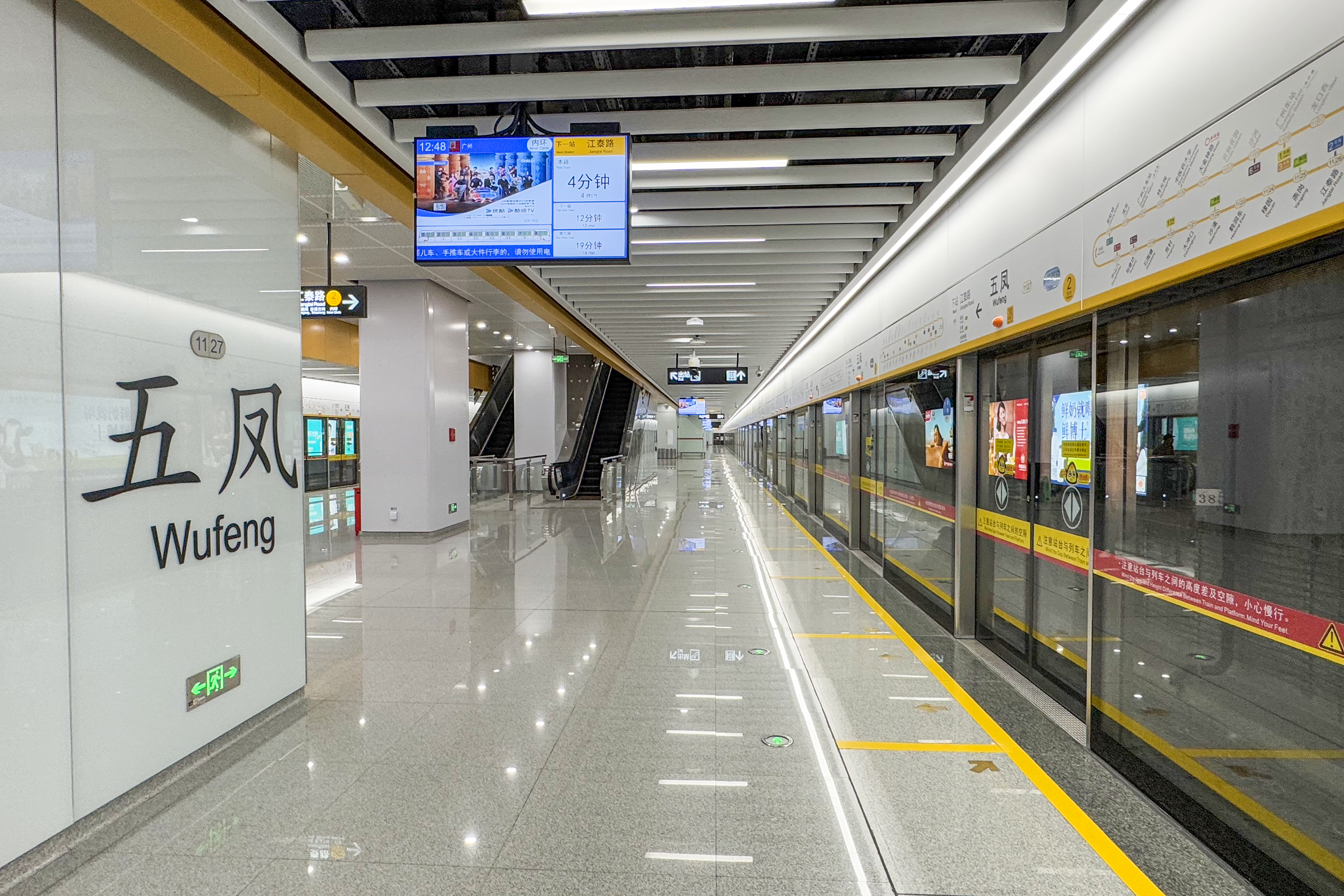
Line 11 Platform 2 (Inner Circle platform)

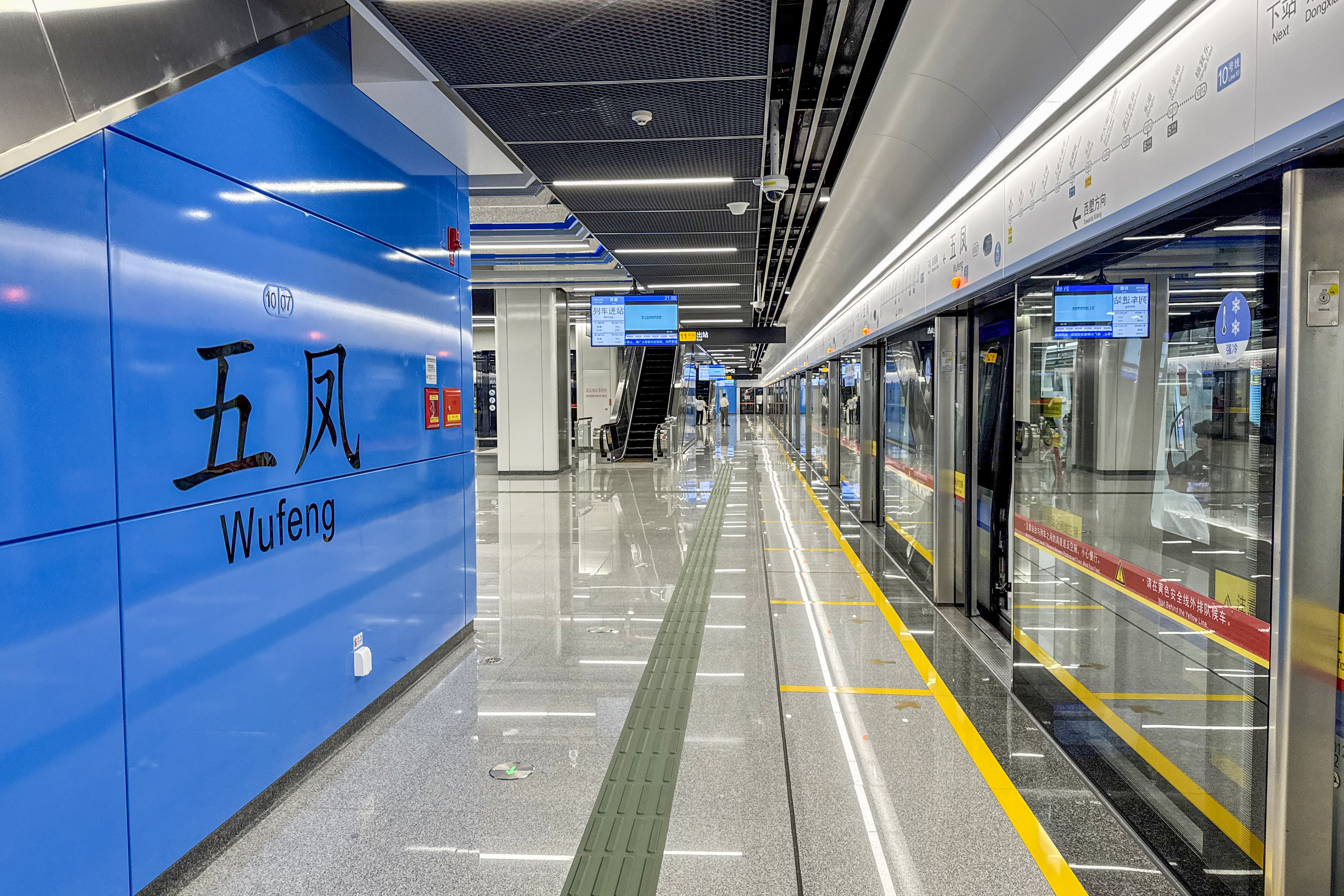
Line 10 Platform 4 (towards Xilang)

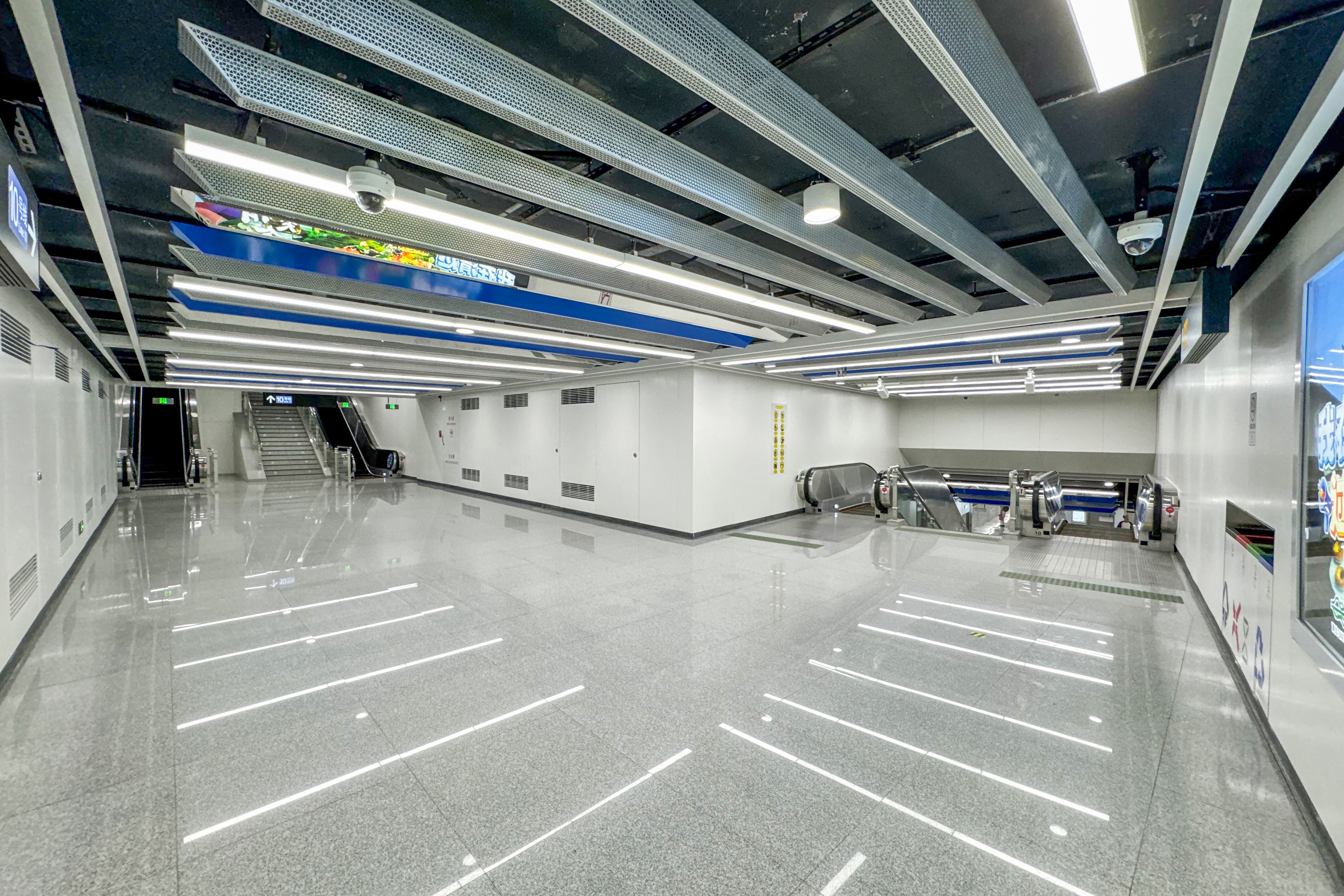
Transfer level between the two lines
