= Line 10 (Guangzhou Metro) =

Metro line of Guangzhou Metro

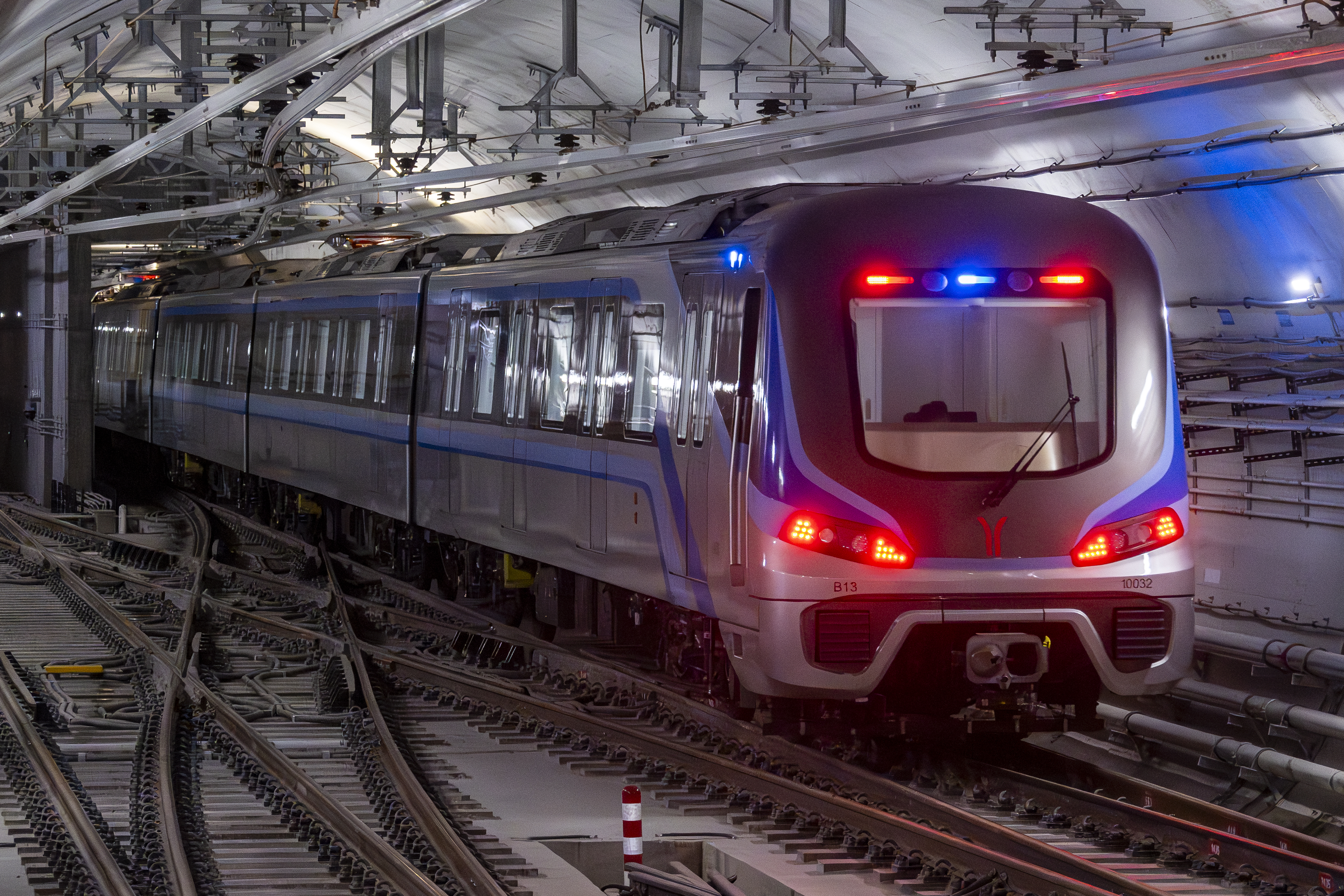
- Line 10 train at Xilang station

Overview
- Other name(s): M10 (plan name); Wushan line (五山线)
- Status: In operation
- Owner: City of Guangzhou
- Locale: Liwan, Haizhu, Yuexiu and Tianhe districts Guangzhou, Guangdong
- Termini: Xilang; Tianhe Coach Terminal
- Stations: 12 as of 29 December 2025; 1 under construction, 5 pending renovation

Service
- Type: Rapid transit
- System: Guangzhou Metro
- Services: 1
- Operator: Guangzhou Metro Corporation
- Daily ridership: 139,200 (2025 average)

History
- Opened: 29 June 2025; 15 months ago

Technical
- Line length: 17.2 km (10.7 mi) (initial section); 25.35 km (15.75 mi) (including the Line 3 branch dismantling section)
- Track gauge: 1,435 mm (4 ft 8 1/2 in)
- Operating speed: 80 km/h

Line 10
- Simplified Chinese: 广州地铁10号线
- Traditional Chinese: 廣州地鐵10號線
Transcriptions
Standard Mandarin
- Hanyu Pinyin: Guǎngzhōu Dìtiě Shí Hào Xiàn
- Bopomofo: ㄍㄨㄤˇ ㄓㄡ ㄉㄧˋ ㄊㄧㄝˇ ㄕˊ ㄏㄠˋ ㄒㄧㄢˋ
Yue: Cantonese
- Jyutping: gwong2 zau1 dei6 tit3 sap6 hou6 sin3

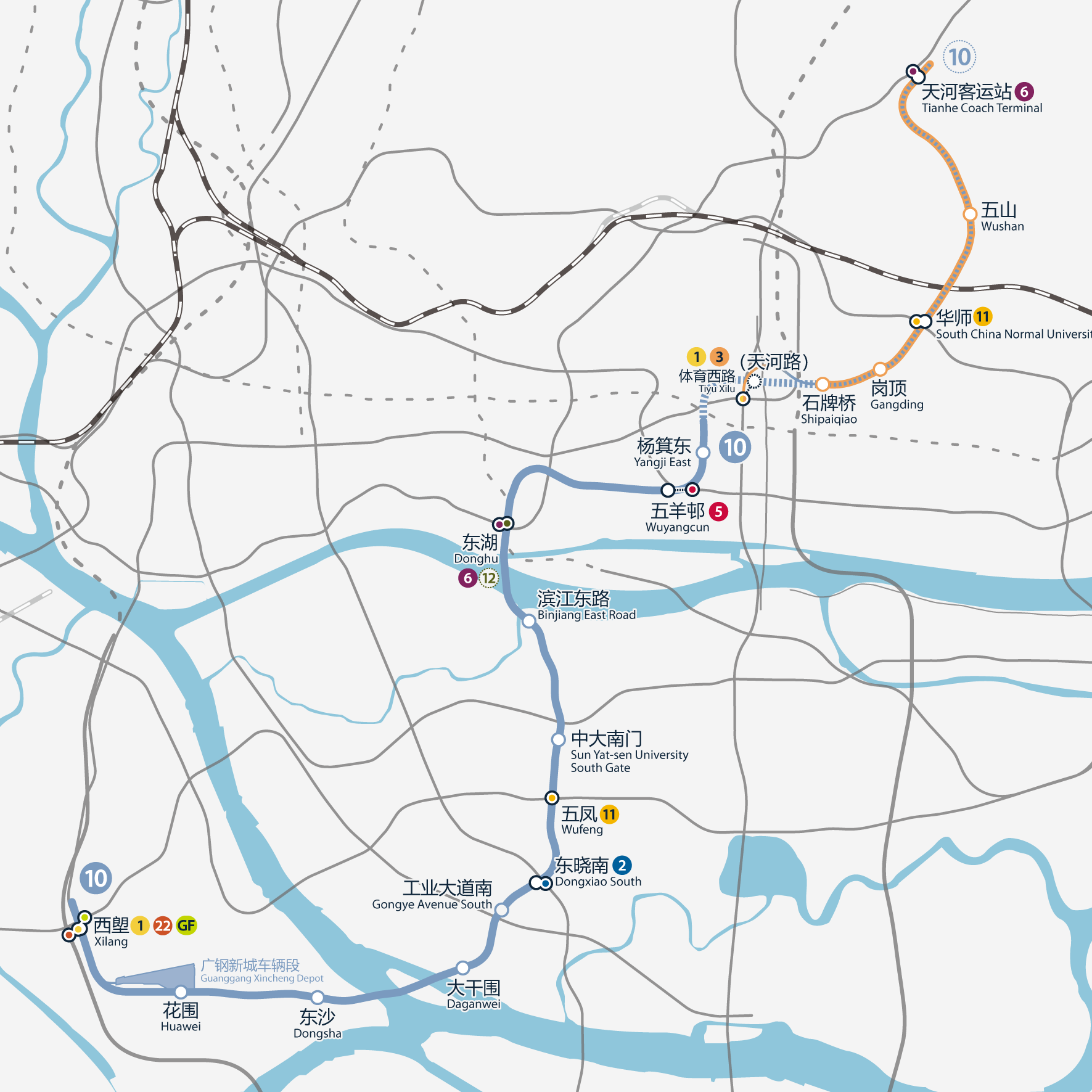
Line 10 drawn to scale.

Line 10 of the Guangzhou Metro is a 17.2 km (10.7 mi) rapid transit rail line in operation in Guangzhou. It runs from Tianhe district in the northeast to Liwan district in the southwest, forming an X shape together with Line 12. The line opened on 29 June 2025.

== History ==
In 2007, the chief engineer of Guangzhou Metro, Shaozhang Chen, proposed removing a branch of the severely overcrowded Line 3 and integrating it into a new northeast to southwest diagonal line to increase efficiency of the network. Soon after, two versions of a long-term network map were released for public consultation, with both proposing a Line 10 as such a diagonal line. It again appeared on long-term plans in 2010, running from Tianhe Coach Station to Dongsha with a total of 15 stations, including those taken over from Line 3.

By 2015, Xilang had replaced Dongsha as the western terminus. With this, detailed plans were released, which showed the line passing straight through the south campus of Sun Yat-Sen University. This prompted severe backlash from the university community, over concerns of damage to historical structures and disturbing sensitive research.

In 2017, Line 10 received planning approval from the National Development and Reform Commission as part of the Guangzhou Urban Rail Transit Phase 3 Construction Plan (2017-2025), with work planned to start the same year and be completed in 2022. Similar approval from Guangzhou authorities was obtained in January 2018, allowing work to start. Work officially started on 19 November 2018 with a ceremony at Dongsha.

The 12-station section from Xilang to Yangji East was opened on 29 June 2025. The entire line, including the branch line of Line 3, was originally meant to become operational at the same, however due to various delays, Sun Yat-sen University South Gate, Tianhe Road and the connection to Line 3 could not be completed in time.

Sun Yat-sen University South Gate opened on 29 December 2025. As of January 2026, the remaining section is 69% complete, with work continuing at the main structure of Tianhe Road station and the tunnel between Tianhe Rd and Shipaiqiao.

=== Opening timeline ===
| Segment | Commencement | Length | Station(s) | Name |
|---|---|---|---|---|
| Xilang — Yangji East | 29 June 2025 | 17.2 km (10.69 mi) | 11 | Initial section |
| Sun Yat-Sen University South Gate | 29 December 2025 | Infill station | 1 | Initial section |

== Stations ==
| Station No. | Station name | | Connections | Future Connections | Location |
| Station No. | English | Chinese | Connections | Future Connections | Location |
|---|---|---|---|---|---|
| 1001 | Xilang | 西塱 | 1 101 Guangfo GF18 22 2207 | | Liwan |
| 1002 | Huawei | 花围 | | 11 | Liwan |
| 1003 | Dongsha | 东沙 | | | Liwan |
| 1004 | Daganwei | 大干围 | | | Haizhu |
| 1005 | Gongye Avenue South | 工业大道南 | | | Haizhu |
| 1006 | Dongxiao South | 东晓南 | 2 207 | | Haizhu |
| 1007 | Wufeng | 五凤 | 11 1127 | | Haizhu |
| 1008 | Sun Yat-sen University South Gate | 中大南门 | | | Haizhu |
| 1009 | Binjiang East Road | 滨江东路 | | | Haizhu |
| 1010 | Donghu | 东湖 | 6 613 | 12 1216 | Yuexiu |
| 1011 | Wuyangcun | 五羊邨 | 5 512 (OSI) | | Yuexiu |
| 1012 | Yangji East | 杨箕东 | | | Tianhe |

=== Rear section (under construction) and existing Line 3 branch section ===
Legend

- Stations under construction

| Station name | | Connections | Future Connections | Location |
| English | Chinese | Connections | Future Connections | Location |
|---|---|---|---|---|
| Tianhe Road | 天河路 | Via Tiyu Xilu: 1 114 3 311; OSI via Tianhenan: APM APM07 | OSI via Huacheng Square North: 13 | Tianhe |
| Shipaiqiao | 石牌桥 | | | Tianhe |
| Gangding | 岗顶 | | | Tianhe |
| South China Normal University | 华师 | 11 1106 | | Tianhe |
| Wushan | 五山 | | | Tianhe |
| Tianhe Coach Terminal | 天河客运站 | 6 621 | | Tianhe |

== Operations ==
=== Rollingstock ===
Line 10 uses 6 car (4 motor, 2 trailer) Type B permanent magnet motor trains with a top speed of 80 km/h (50 mph). This is the first line on Guangzhou Metro to use GoA 4 trains.
