= Diyuan station =

Guangzhou Metro Line 11 station

Diyuan 棣园
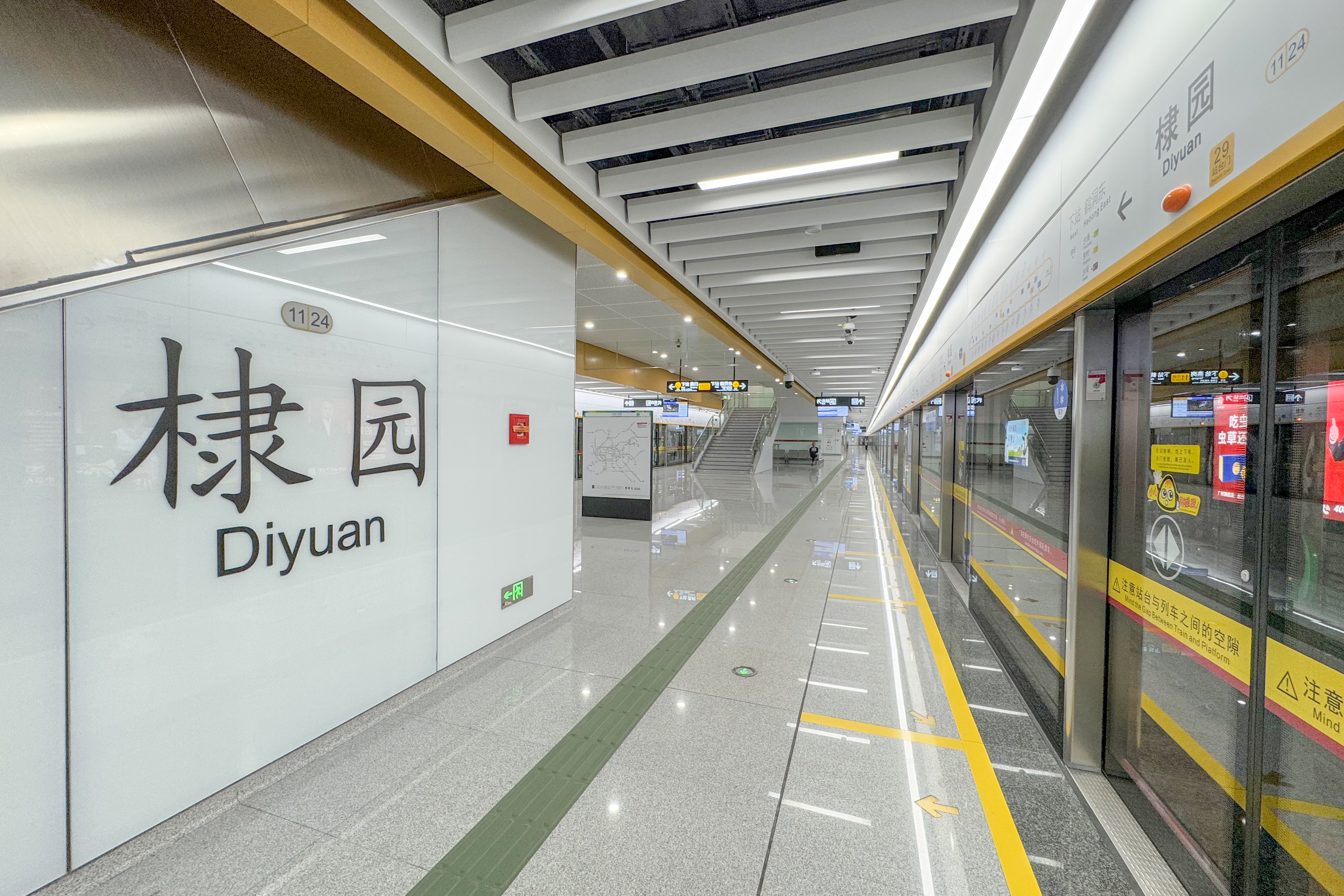
- Platform

Chinese name
- Simplified Chinese: 棣园站
- Traditional Chinese: 棣園站
Transcriptions
Standard Mandarin
- Hanyu Pinyin: Dìyuán Zhàn
Yue: Cantonese
- Yale Romanization: Dáiyùhn Jaahm
- Jyutping: Dai^{6}jyun^{4} Zaam^{6}

General information
- Location: East of the intersection of Huandao Road (环岛路) (under planning) and Nanshi Road (南石路), Nanshitou Subdistrict; Haizhu District, Guangzhou, Guangdong; China
- Coordinates: 23°4′32.59″N 113°15′33.16″E
- Operator: Guangzhou Metro Co. Ltd.
- Line: Line 11
- Platforms: 2 (1 island platform)
- Tracks: 2

Construction
- Structure type: Underground
- Accessible: Yes

Other information
- Station code: 1124

History
- Opened: 28 December 2024 (19 months ago)
- Former names: Nanshi Road (南石路)

Services
Preceding station	Guangzhou Metro	Following station
Yangang Outer Circle	Line 11	Hedong East Inner Circle
Location

Diyuan Station (simplified Chinese: 棣园站; traditional Chinese: 棣園站; pinyin: Dìyuán Zhàn; Cantonese Yale: Dáiyùhn Jaahm) is a station on Line 11 of the Guangzhou Metro. It started operations on 28 December 2024. It is located underground at the east of the intersection of Huandao Road and Nanshi Road in Haizhu District.

There is a set of double storage lines at the east end of the station to allow for train turnback.

== Station Layout ==
G	-	Exits A, B, C
L1	Lobby	Ticket Machines, Customer Service, Shops, Police Station, Security Facilities
L2	Mezzanine	Station Equipment
L3; Platforms	Platform 2	11 Inner Circle (Hedong East)
L3; Platforms	Island platform, doors will open on the left (Toilets, Nursery)
L3; Platforms	Platform 1	11 Outer Circle (Yangang)

=== Entrances/exits ===
The station has 3 points of entry/exit. Exit B is equipped with an elevator.

- A: Nanshi Road
- B: Nanshi Road, Guangzhou No. 41 Middle School (East Campus)
- C: Nanshi Road
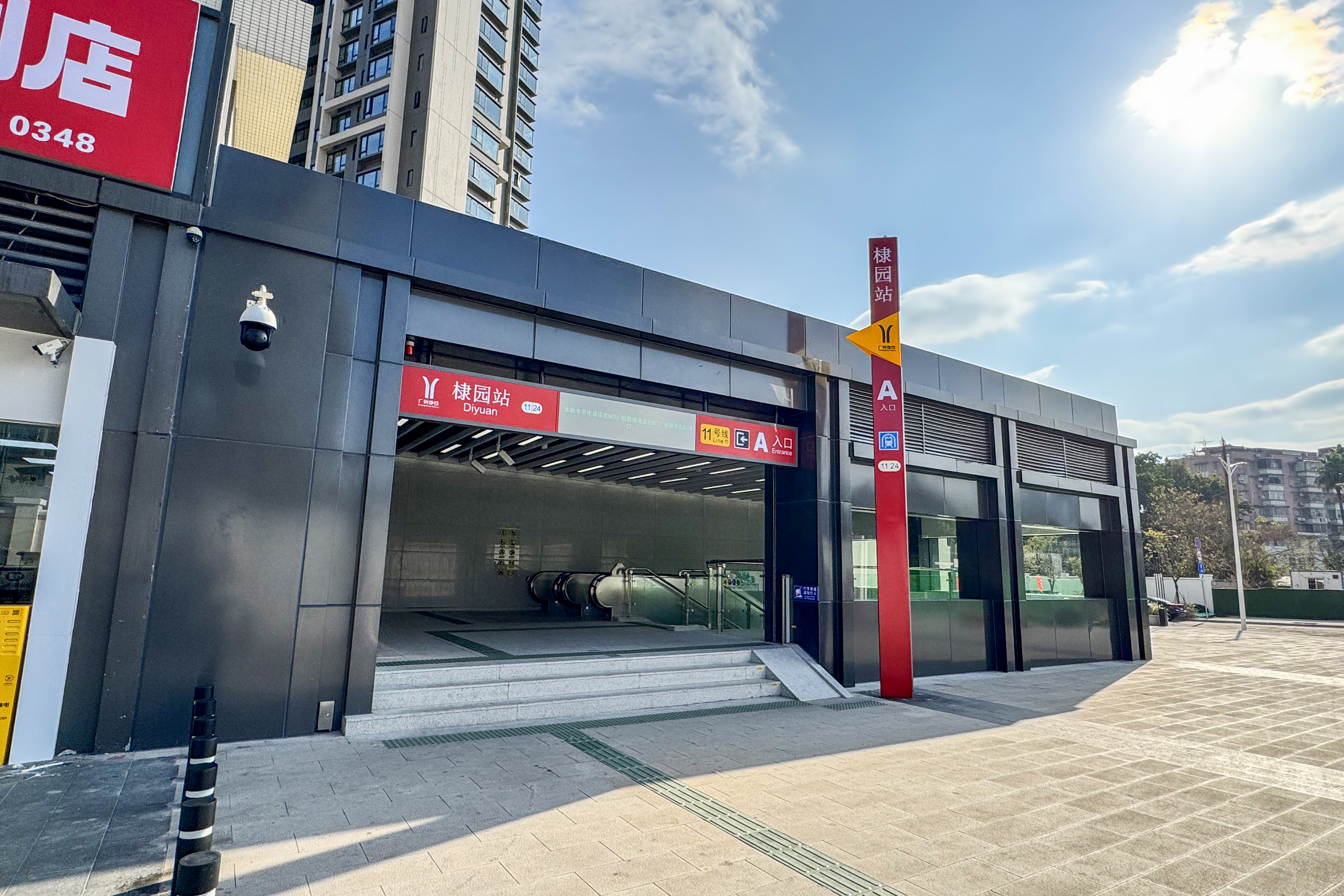
Entrance A

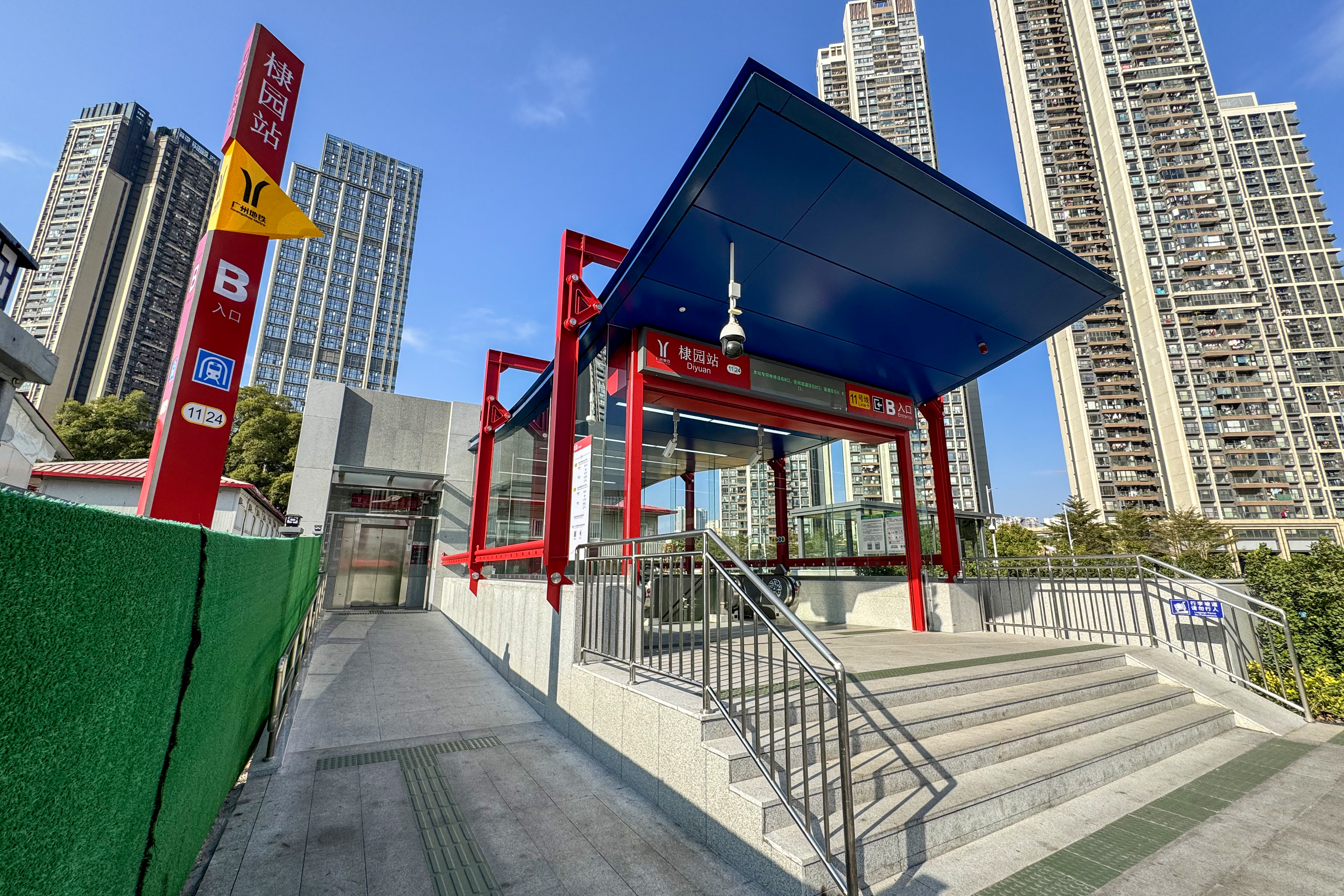
Entrance B

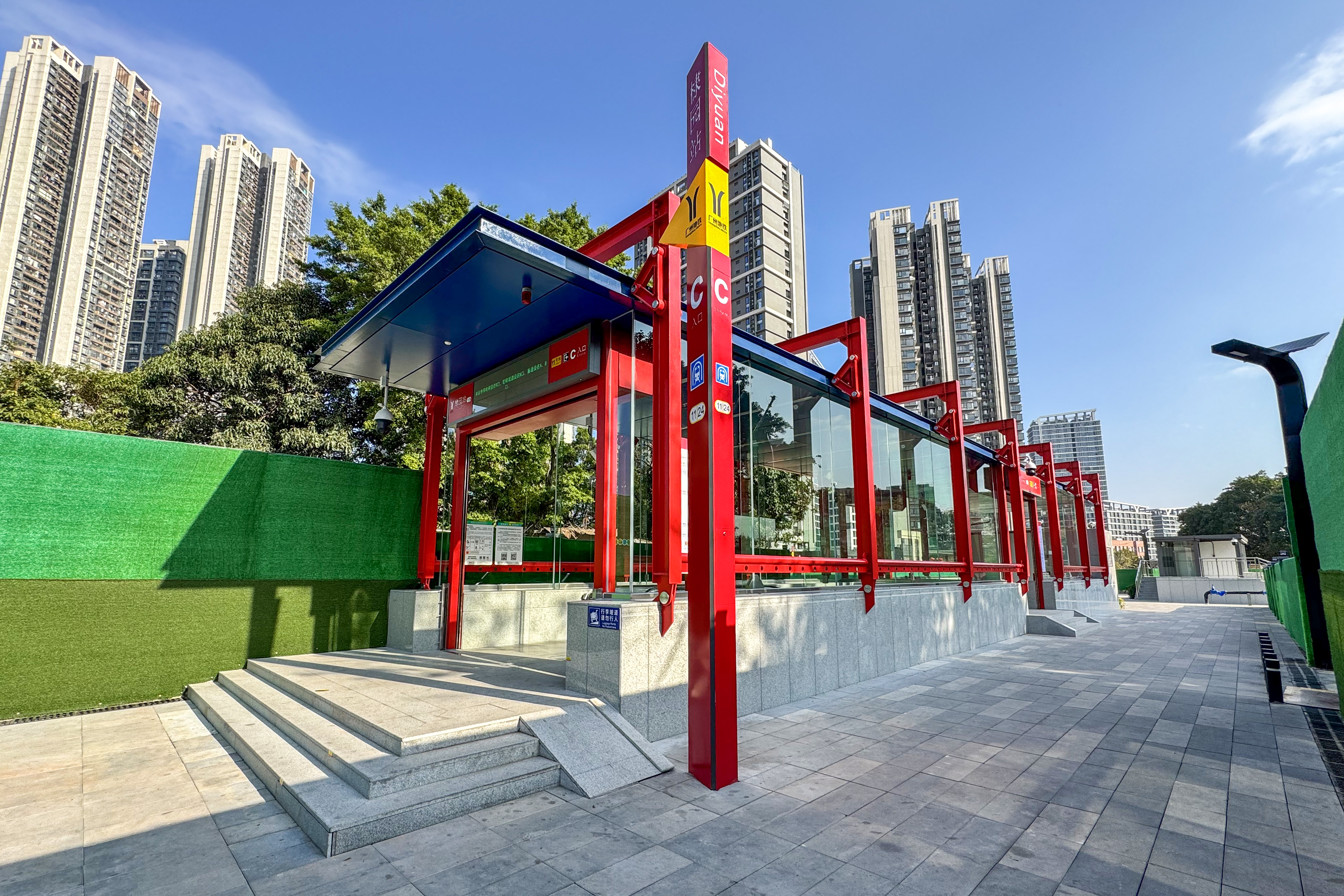
Entrance C

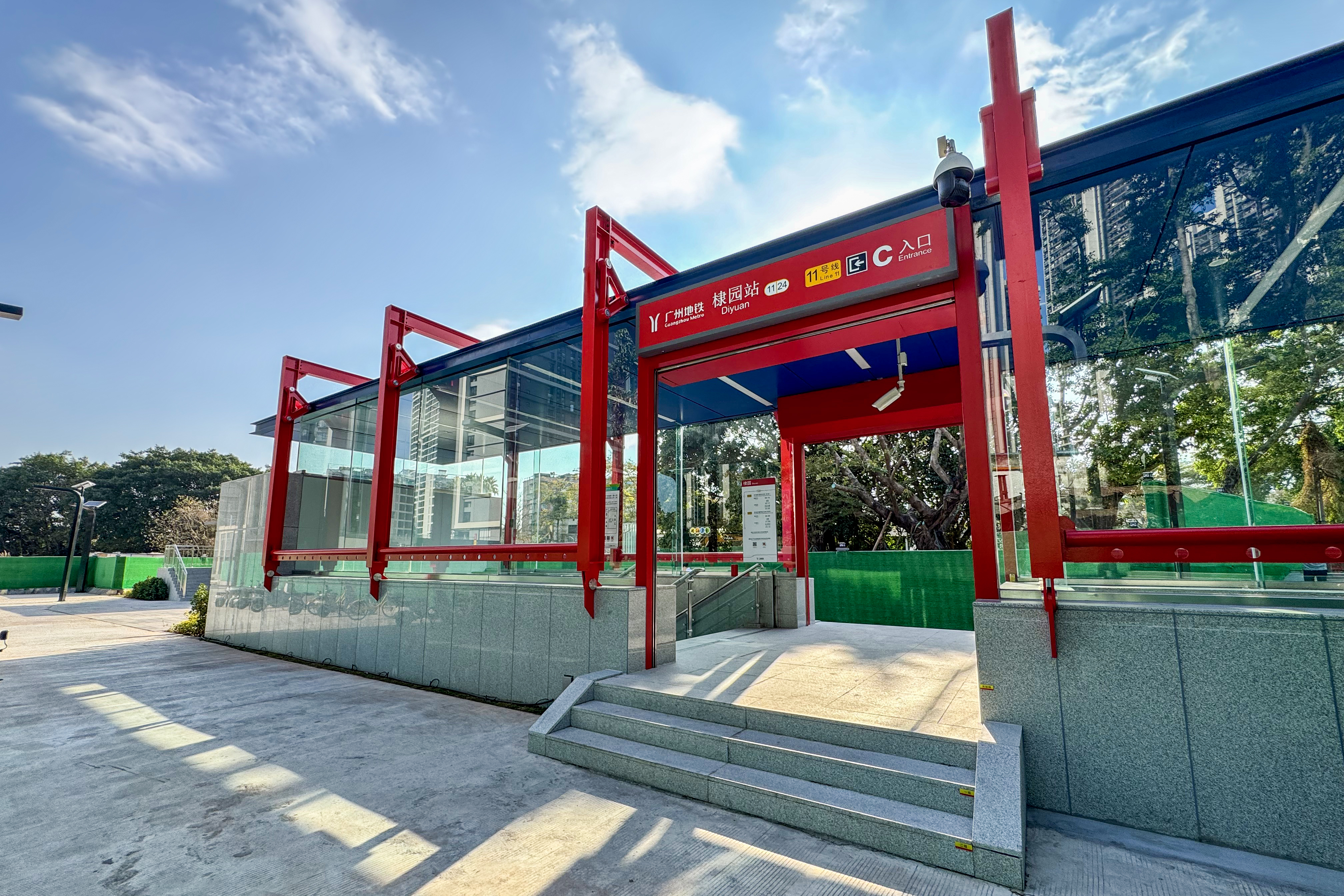
Entrance C (side entrance)

== Gallery ==
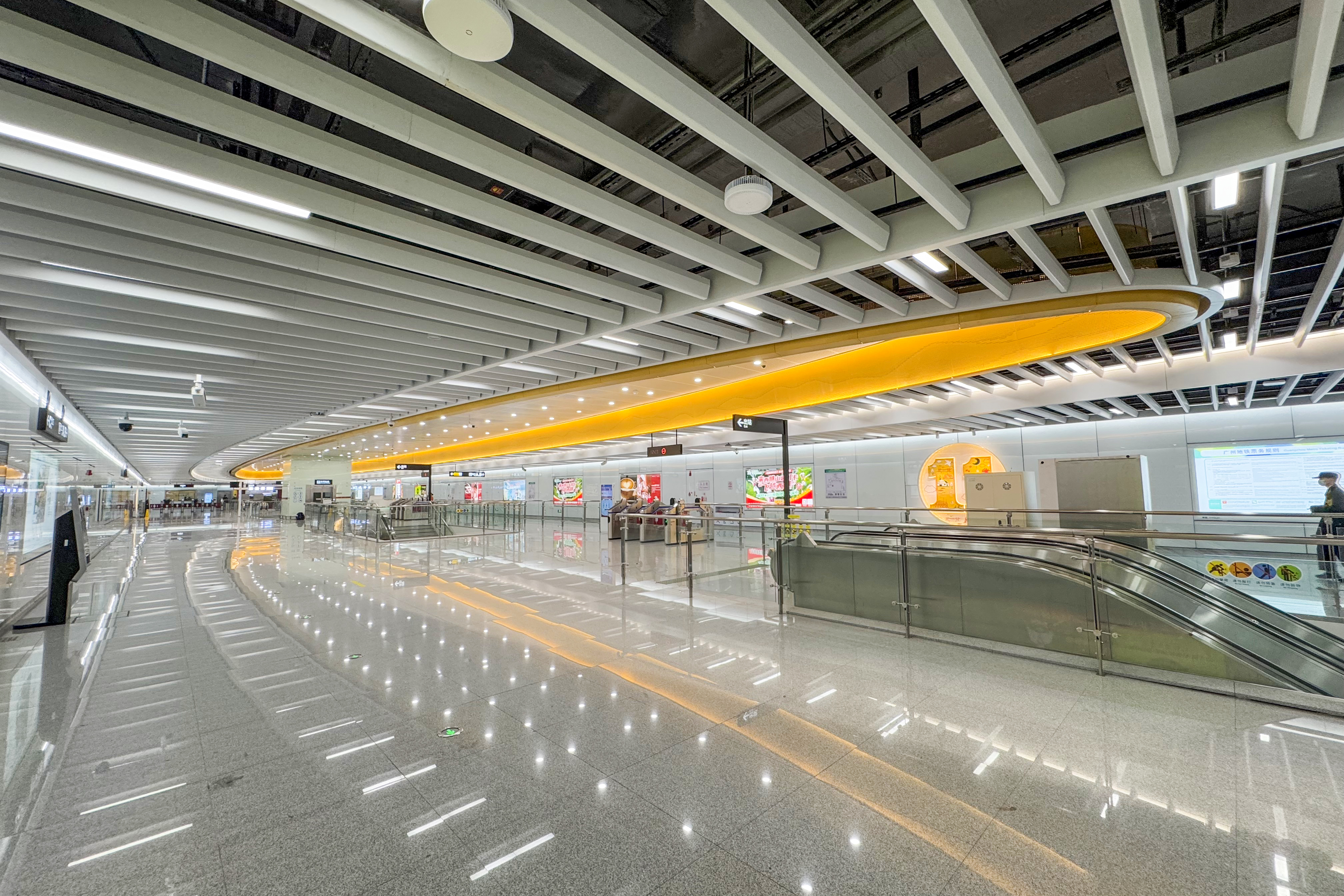
Concourse

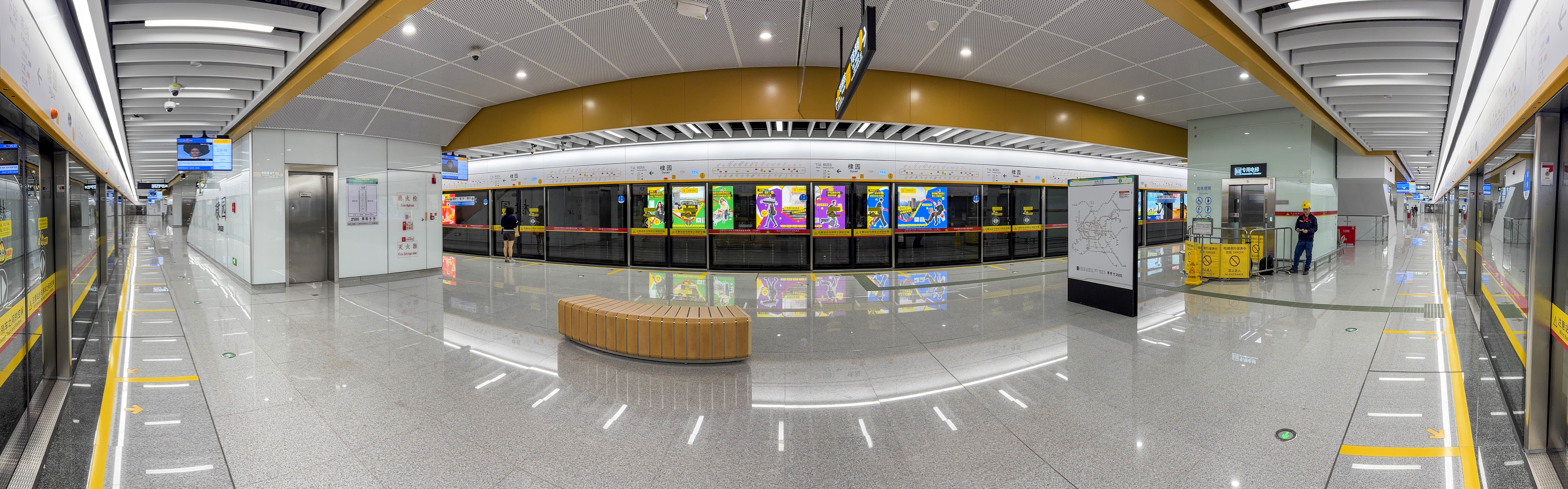
Platform 1 panorama

== History ==
The station was called Nanshi Lu (Road) station during the planning and construction phases. Construction of the station began on 18 February 2017, and the main structure was topped out on 20 November 2020.

In June 2023, the preliminary name of the stations on Line 11 was announced. Because the station is located directly south of Diyuan Estate, and according to Article 5 (1) of the "Guangzhou Metro Station Naming Rules", the station is planned to be named Diyuan station. The naming of the station sparked a discussion among the public, with some citizens supporting the naming of the subway station to protect the old place name and continue the history, while others believed that the popularity of Diyuan was not as good as that of Nanshi. A month later, the Civil Affairs Bureau issued a statement for soliciting opinions, arguing that the old place name should be given priority to the name of the metro station, and the station site was further away from the Nanshi Sub-district Office than from Diyuan Estate, so the name of the "Nanshitou" station was not adopted; However, it is pointed out that the "Nanshitou" station name can be used in the naming of stations on the new metro line in the future. In May 2024, the station was officially named "Diyuan Station".

On 28 December 2024, the station was put into use with the opening of Line 11.

== Construction incident ==
There are three wind shafts at the east end of the station, all of which are located between the nearby Xinghui Haizhuwan Community A and B. Some residents think that the wind shaft is too close to the building, and they are also dissatisfied with the early publicity being too hidden, the noise protection distance measurement is unreasonable, the construction of the wind pavilion disturbs the people, etc., which led to them opposing the construction of the wind shaft. The subway responded that the wind shaft was set up to meet the requirements of the specification. Some residents also said that the construction plan of the metro station was earlier than the real estate plan and supported the construction of the metro to improve the local transportation conditions. The above controversy led to the suspension of construction of the wind shaft at the eastern end of the station from May 2023, and the construction progress was seriously delayed. In December 2023, Guangzhou Metro Group re-applied for the "Construction Project Planning Permit" for the ancillary works of the station and posted it on the website, clarifying that the land is not within the scope of the net land use of the community, and the straight-line distance between the wind shaft, safety exit and the boundary of the community and the building also meets the requirements. With the facilitation and coordination of the authorities, the metro corporation obtained the approval of the permit, and the relevant wind shafts resumed work on 1 April 2024.
