= Hedong East station =

Guangzhou Metro Line 11 station

Hedong East 鹤洞东
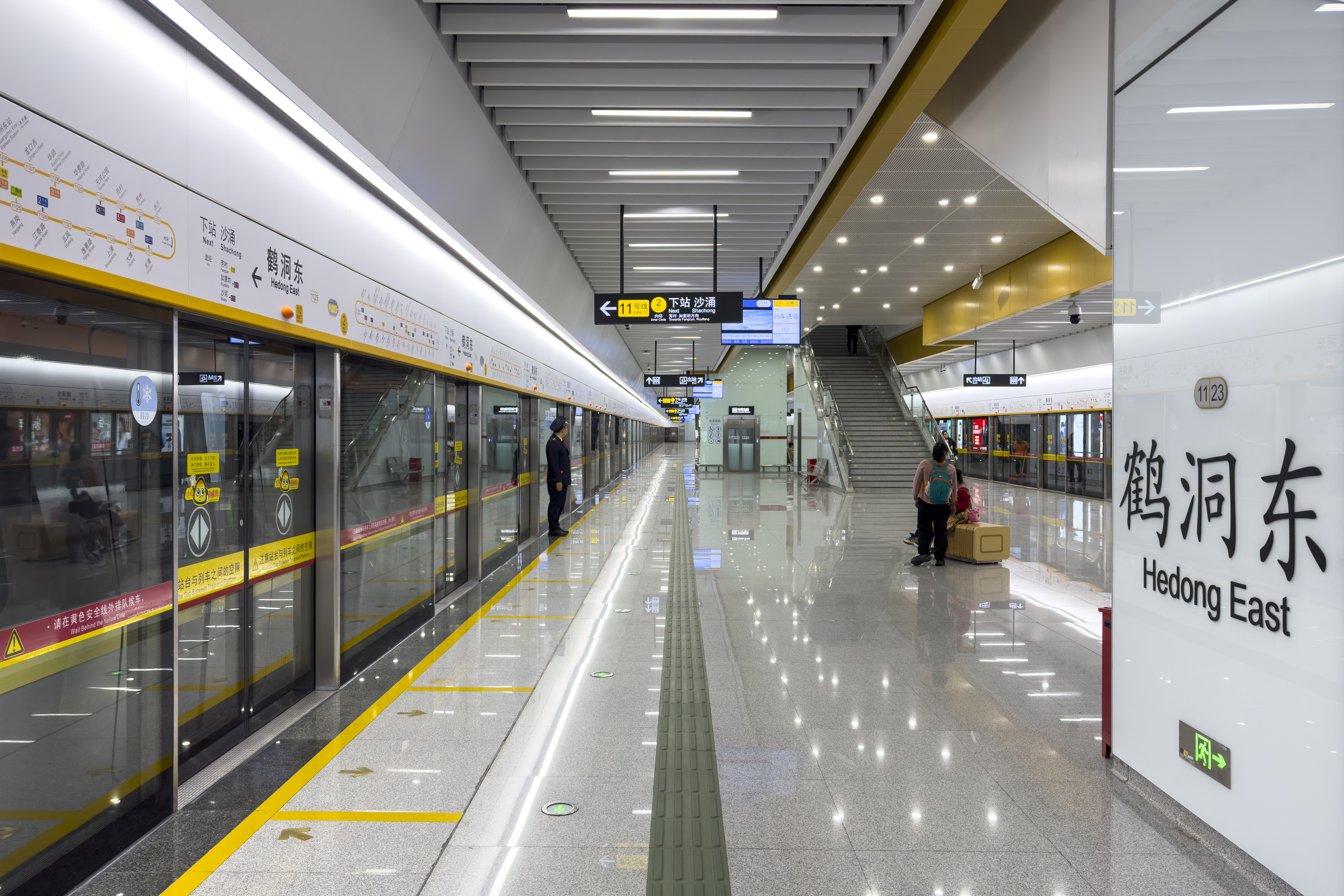
- Platform 1 (Outer Circle platform)

Chinese name
- Simplified Chinese: 鹤洞东站
- Traditional Chinese: 鶴洞東站
Transcriptions
Standard Mandarin
- Hanyu Pinyin: Hèdòngdōng Zhàn
Yue: Cantonese
- Yale Romanization: Hokdúngdūng Jaahm
- Jyutping: Hok^{6}dung^{6}dung^{1} Zaam^{6}

General information
- Location: Intersection of Fangcun Avenue South (芳村大道南) and Lixin 1st Street (荔信一街), border of Hedong and Dongsha Subdistricts; Liwan District, Guangzhou, Guangdong; China
- Coordinates: 23°4′25.86″N 113°14′44.38″E
- Operator: Guangzhou Metro Co. Ltd.
- Lines: Line 11; Line 11 (future)
- Platforms: 2 (1 island platform)
- Tracks: 2

Construction
- Structure type: Underground
- Accessible: Yes

Other information
- Station code: 1123

History
- Opened: 28 December 2024 (19 months ago)

Services
Preceding station	Guangzhou Metro	Following station
Diyuan Outer Circle	Line 11	Shachong Inner Circle
Location

Hedong East Station (simplified Chinese: 鹤洞东站; traditional Chinese: 鶴洞東站; pinyin: Hèdòngdōng Zhàn; Cantonese Yale: Hokdúngdūng Jaahm) is a station on Line 11 of the Guangzhou Metro. It started operations on 28 December 2024. It is located underground at the intersection of Fangcun Avenue South and Lixin 1st Street in Liwan District.

== Station Layout ==
G	-	Exits A, B, C, D
L1	Lobby	Ticket Machines, Customer Service, Shops, Police Station, Security Facilities
L2; 11 Platforms		11 reserved platform
L2; 11 Platforms	Reserved Island platform
L2; 11 Platforms		11 reserved platform
L2; 11 Platforms	Mezzanine ( 11 )	Passageway between concourse and 11 platforms Station Equipment
L3; 11 Platforms	Platform 2	11 Inner Circle (Shachong)
L3; 11 Platforms	Island platform, doors will open on the left (Toilets, Nursery)
L3; 11 Platforms	Platform 1	11 Outer Circle (Diyuan)

=== Entrances/exits ===
The station has 4 points of entry/exit. Exit B is equipped with an elevator.

- A: Fangcun Avenue South
- B: Lixin 1st Street
- C: Fangcun Avenue South
- D: Fangcun Avenue South
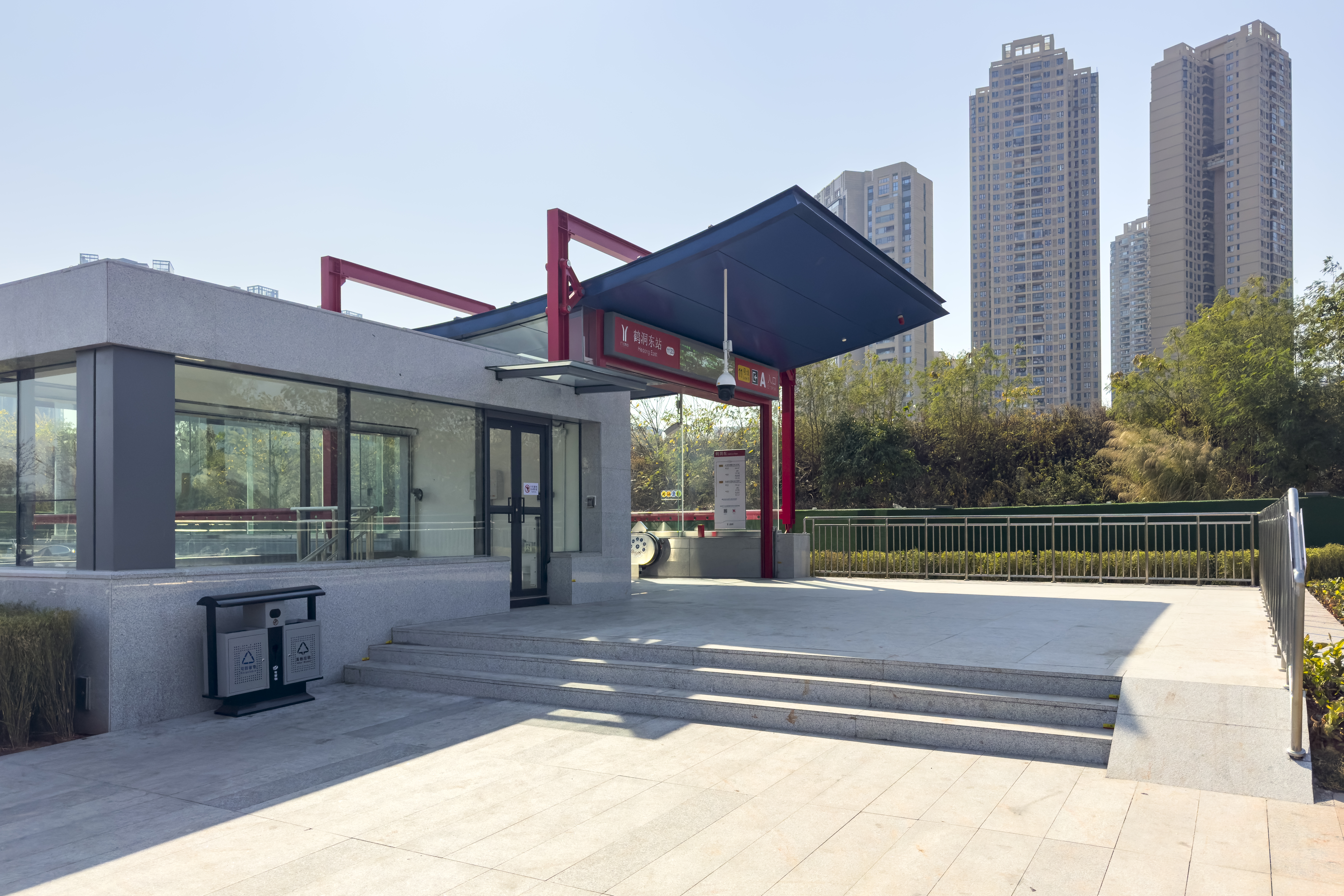
Entrance A

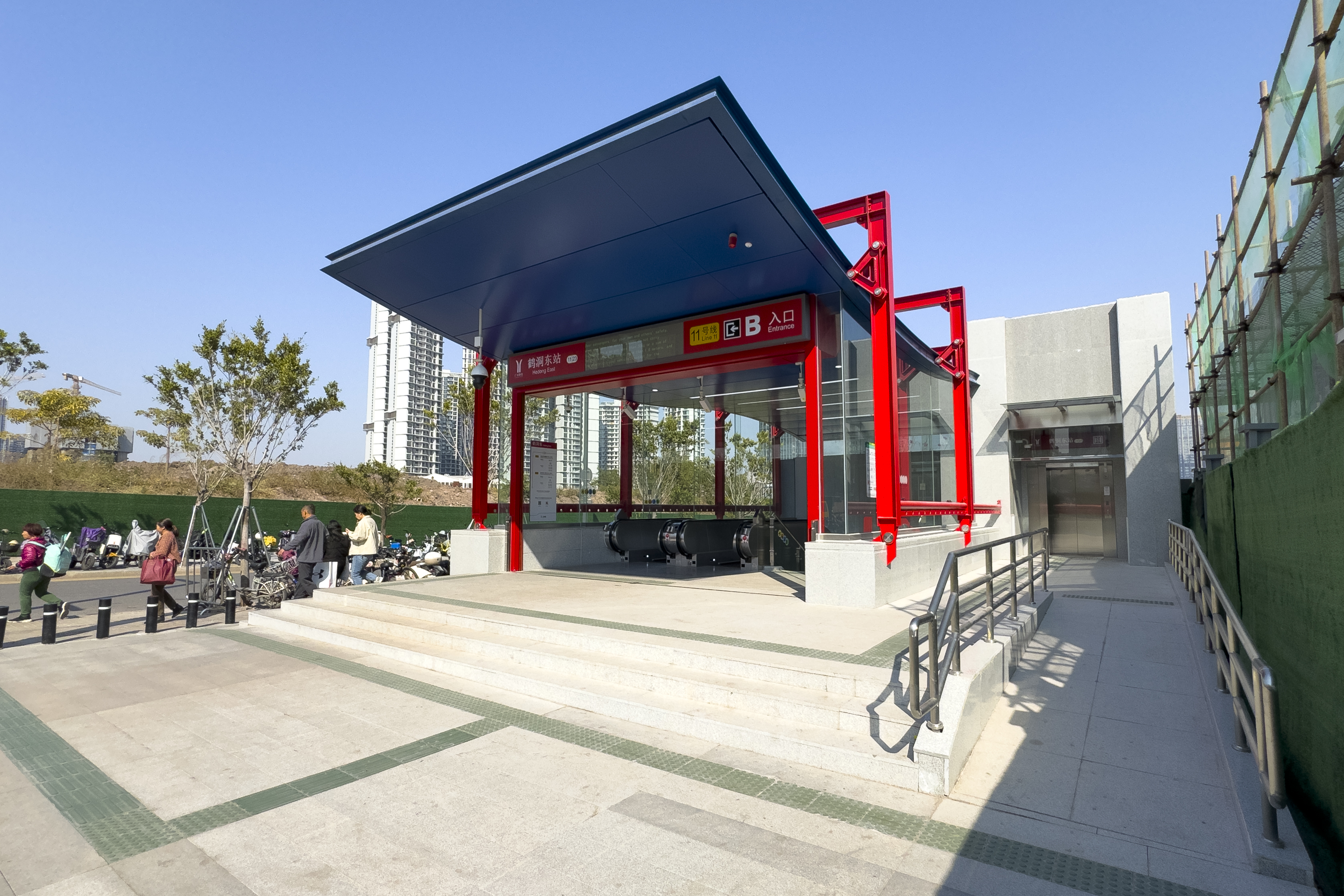
Entrance B

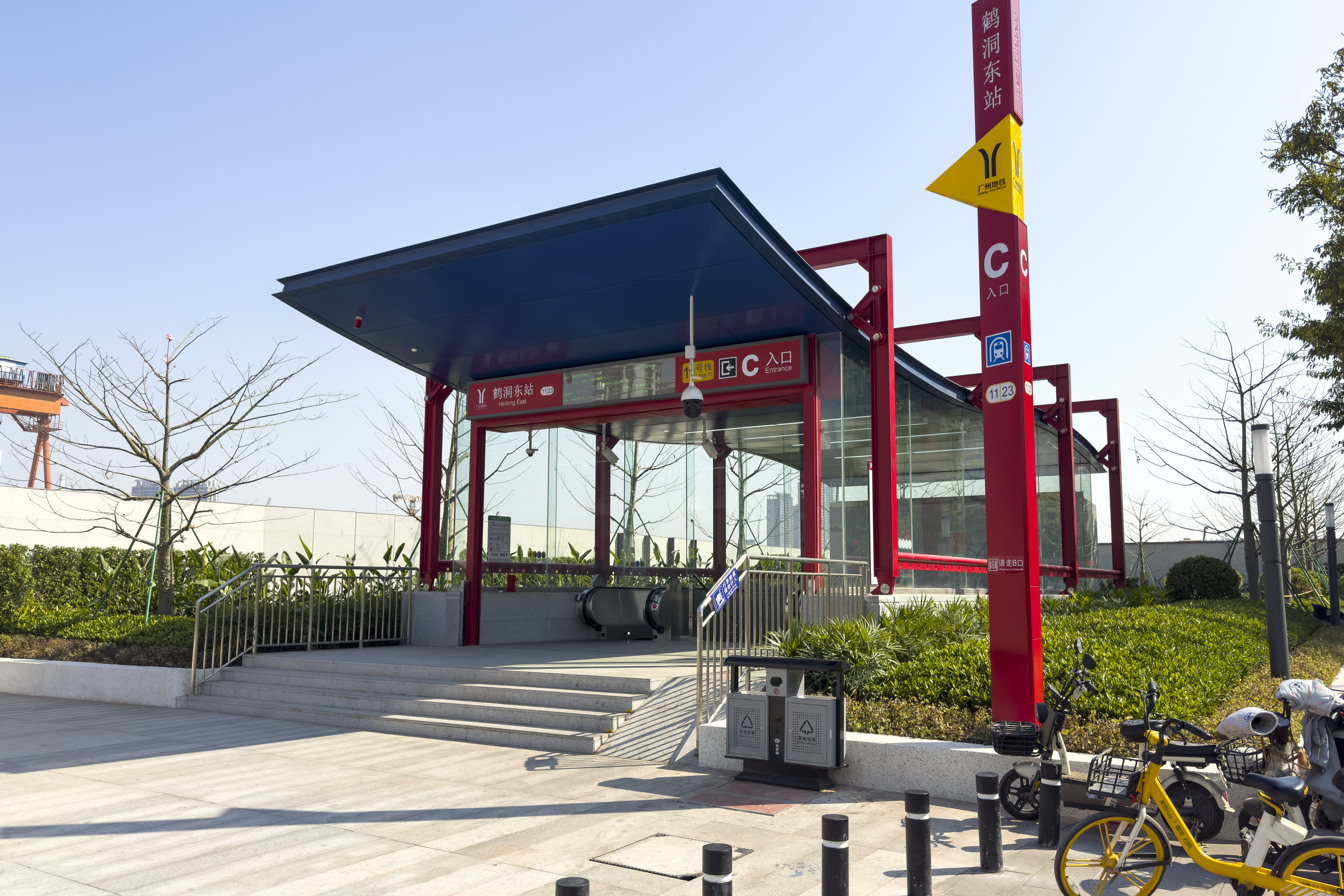
Entrance C

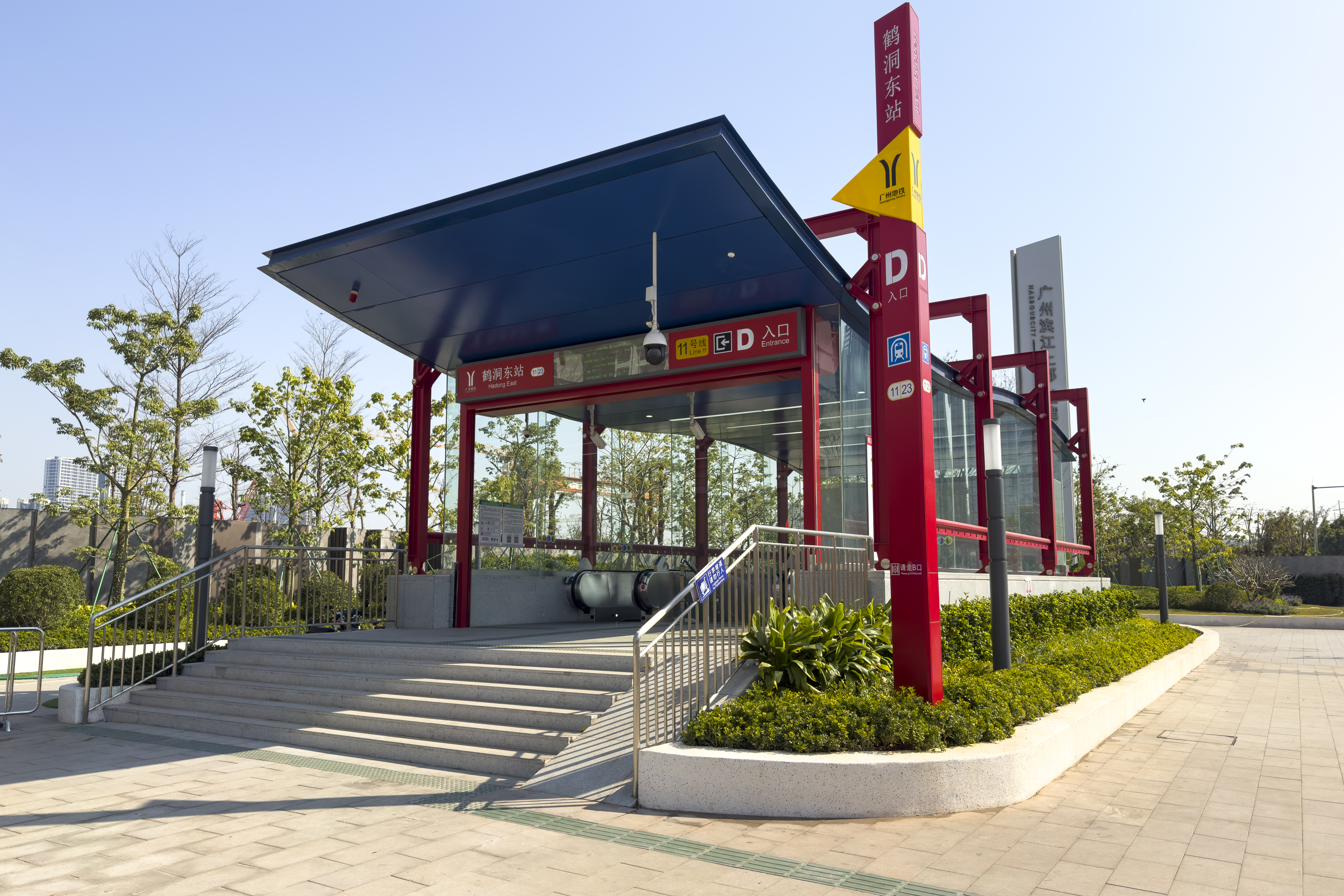
Entrance D

== Gallery ==
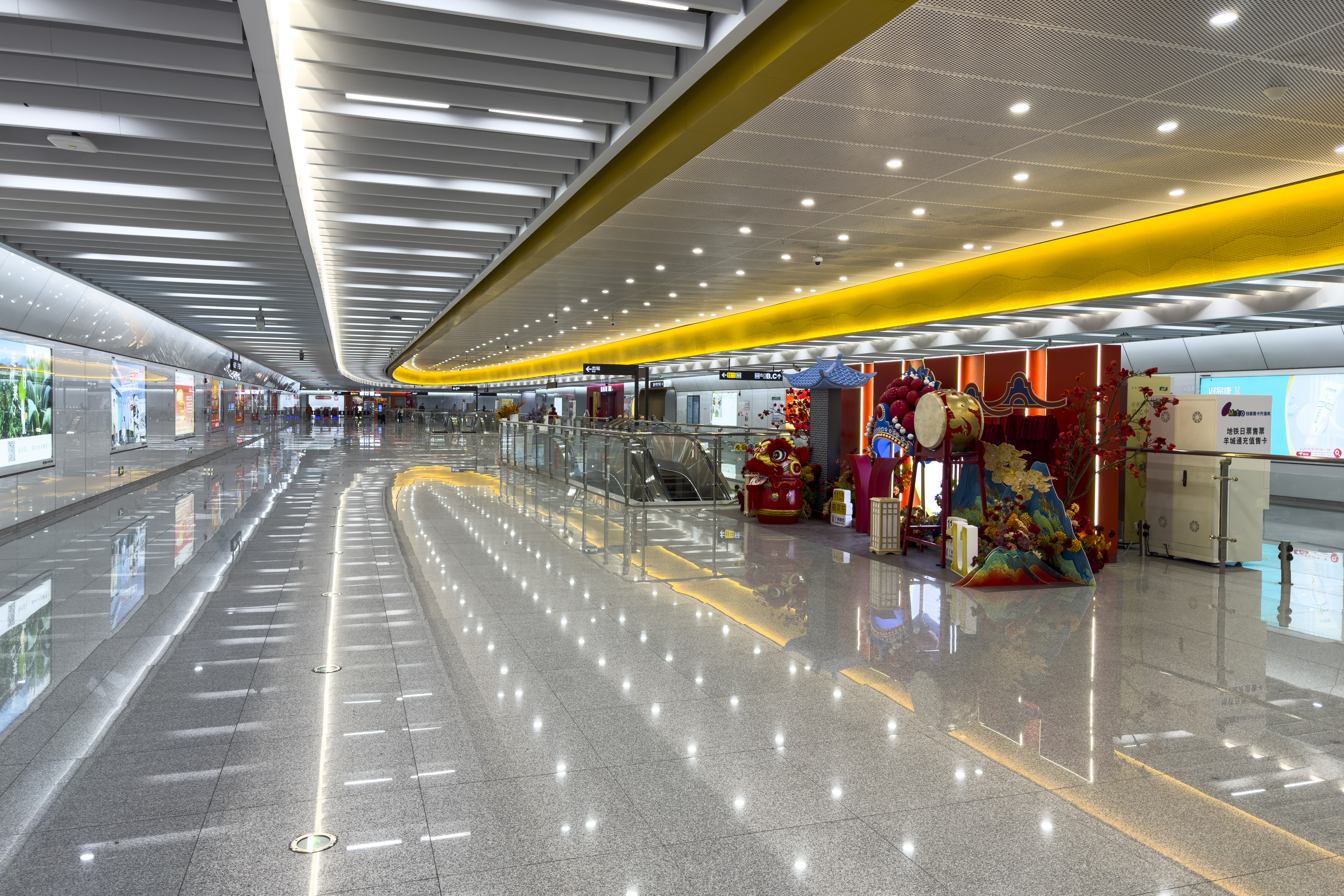
Concourse

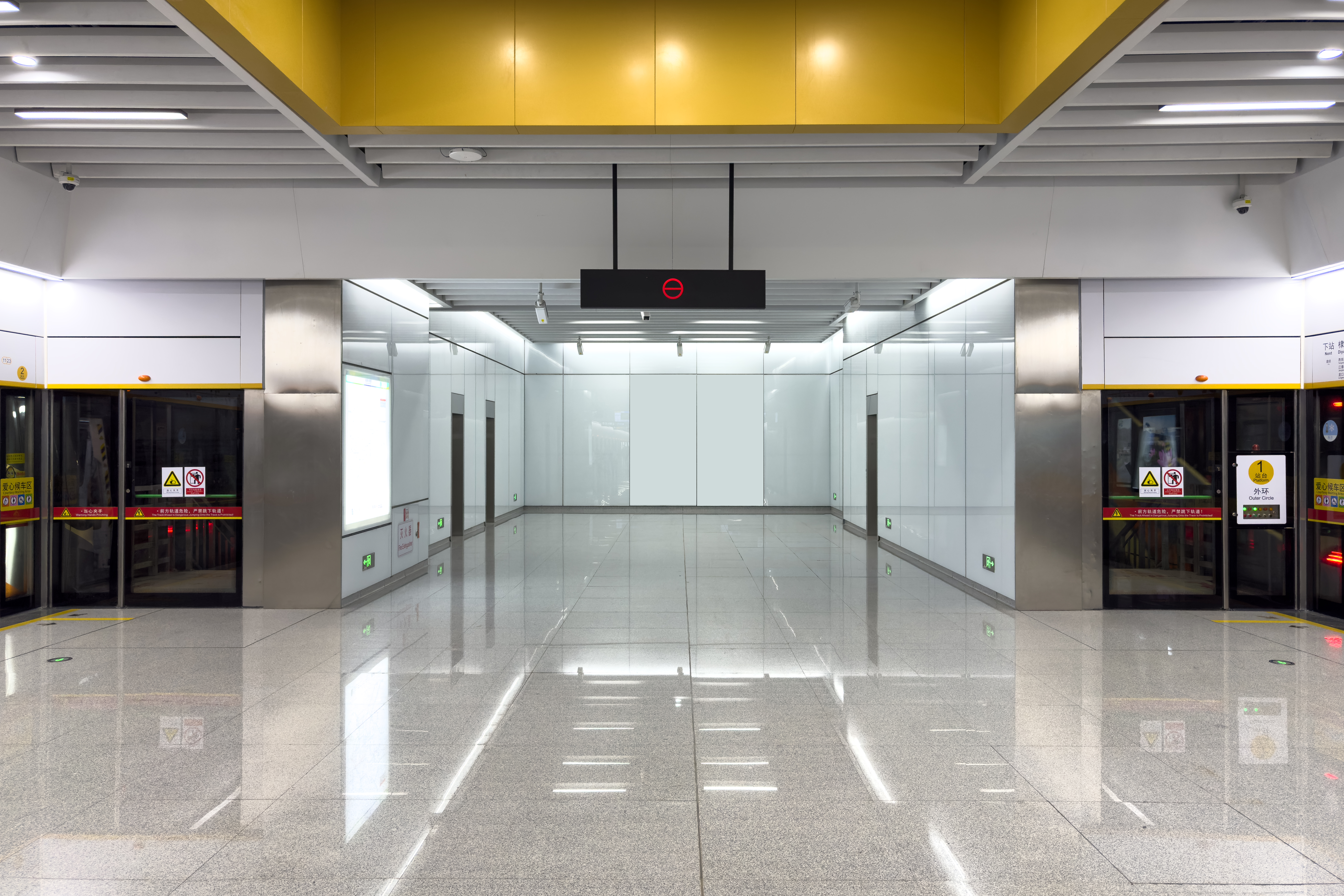
Reserved transfer node to Foshan Line 11 at the south end of the Guangzhou Line 11 platform

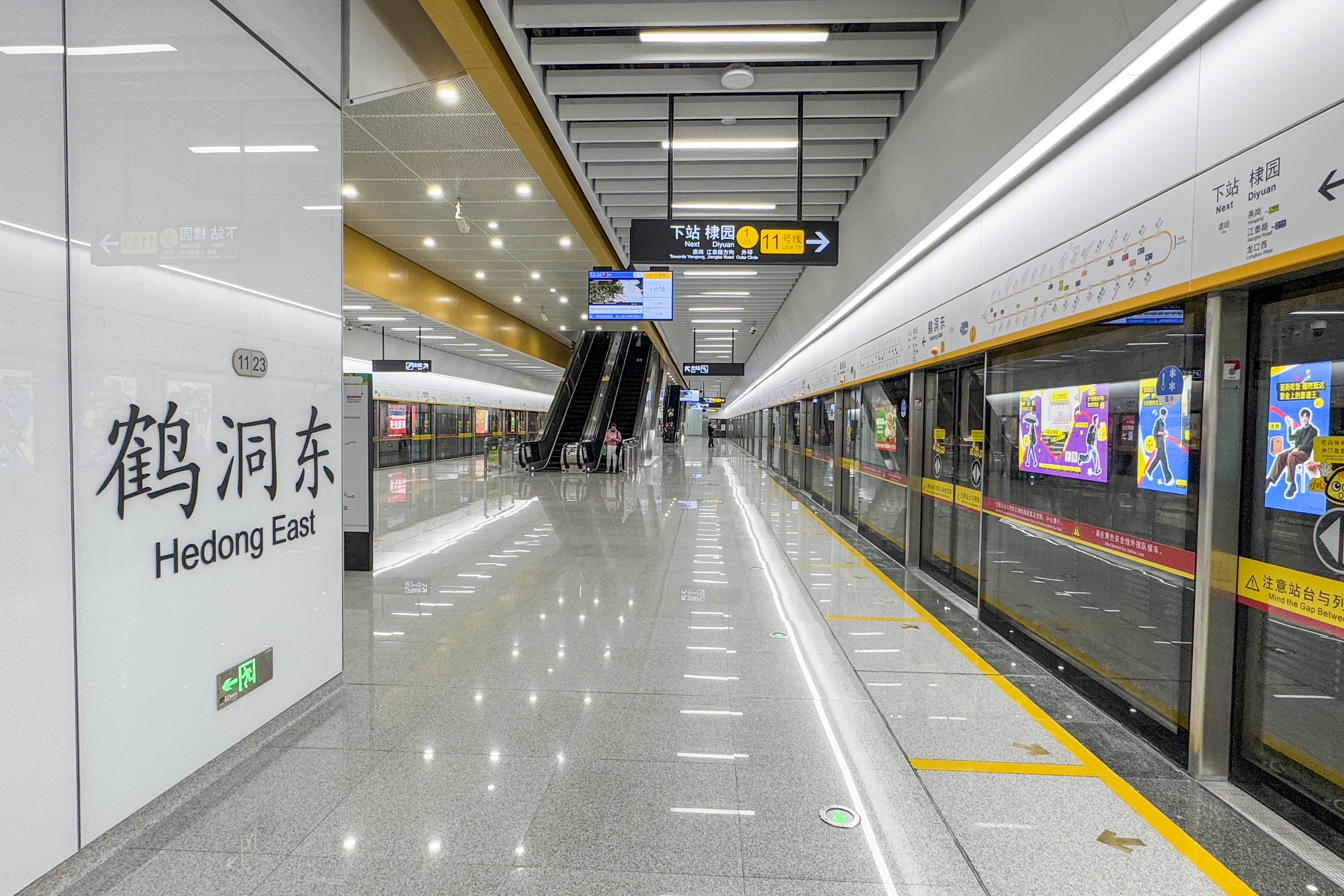
Platform 1 (Line 11 Outer Circle platform)

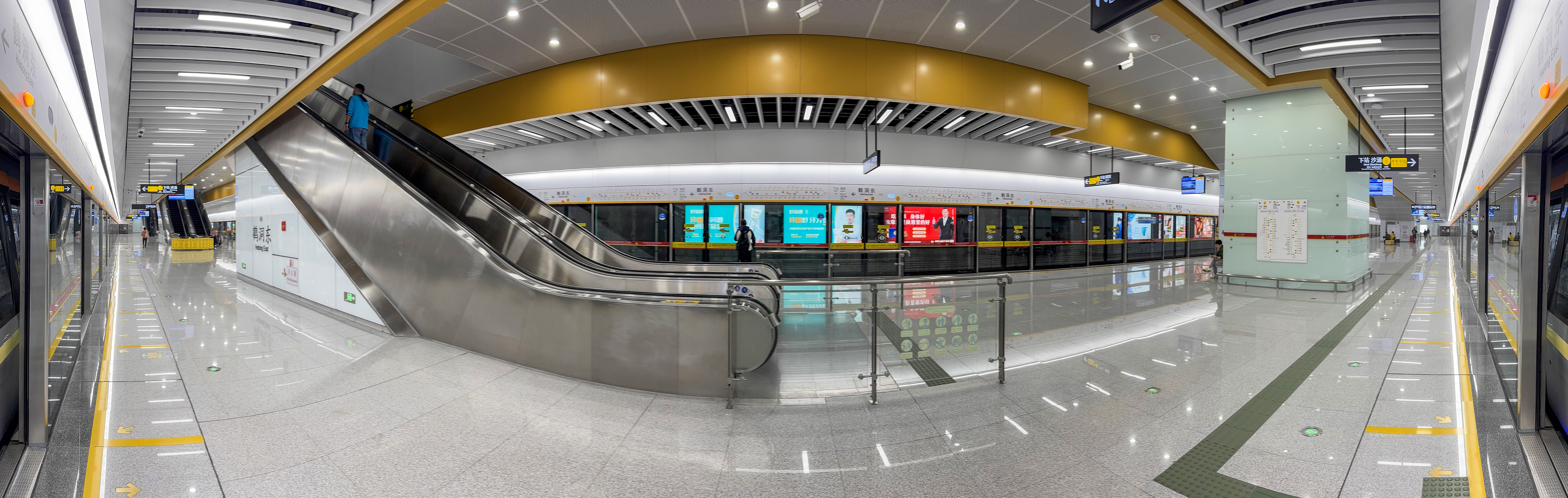
Platform panorama

== History ==
The station first appeared in 2009 under the "Super Ring Line" scheme of Line 11, which was then known as Hedong Daqiao (Hedong Bridge) station. The plan was subsequently adopted, and construction of the station began under the name of Hedongdong (now Hedong East station).

Construction of this station officially started on 28 September 2016, and it is the first construction site of the loop line. On 24 October 2020, the main structure of the station was topped out.

On 3 July 2024, the station completed the "three rights" transfer. On 28 December, the station was put into use with the opening of Line 11.

== Future development ==
Foshan Metro Line 11 will use the station in the future as a terminal station and connect to the Guangzhou Metro Network by connecting to Guangzhou Line 11. Foshan Metro Line 11 was included in the second phase of the Foshan Urban Rail Transit Construction Plan (2021–2026) in 2016 and was approved on 7 January 2021, but construction has not yet started. During construction of the Guangzhou Line 11 station, part of the Foshan Line 11 platform structure and a transfer node at the south end of the Guangzhou Line 11 platforms were therefore built as a reservation.
