= Yangang station =

Guangfo Metro and Guangzhou Metro Line 11 interchange station

Yangang 燕岗
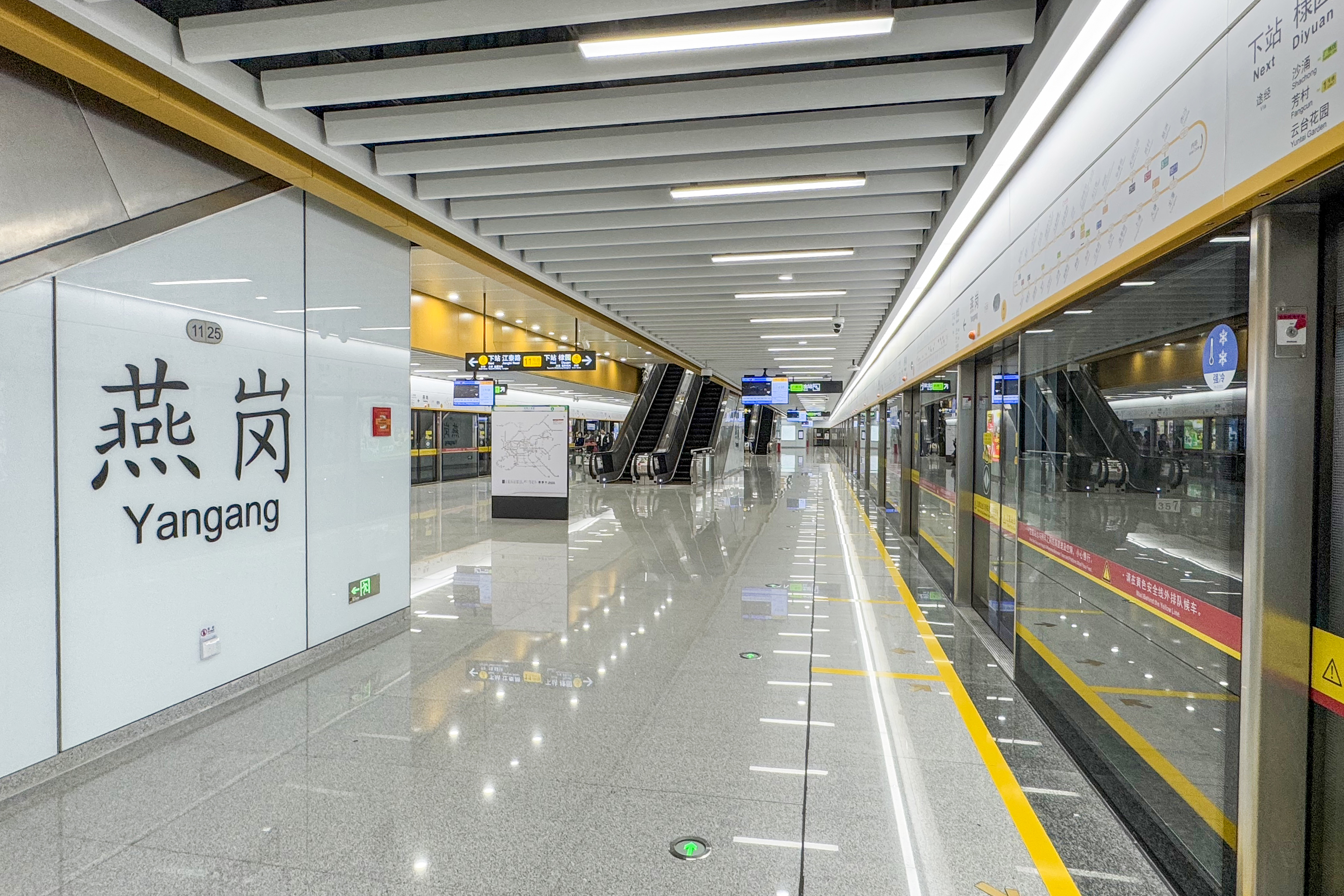
- Line 11 platform 4 (Inner Circle platform)

Chinese name
- Simplified Chinese: 燕岗站
- Traditional Chinese: 燕崗站
Transcriptions
Standard Mandarin
- Hanyu Pinyin: Yāngǎng Zhàn
Yue: Cantonese
- Yale Romanization: Yingōng Jaahm
- Jyutping: jin^{3}gong^{1} zaam^{6}

General information
- Location: Intersection of Industrial Avenue Middle (工业大道) and Quantang Road (泉塘路), Nanshitou Subdistrict; Haizhu District, Guangzhou, Guangdong; China
- Coordinates: 23°4′58″N 113°15′58″E
- Operator: Guangzhou Metro Co. Ltd.
- Lines: Guangfo line; Line 11
- Platforms: 4 (2 island platforms)
- Tracks: 4

Construction
- Structure type: Underground
- Accessible: Yes

Other information
- Station code: 1125 GF22

History
- Opened: Guangfo line: 28 December 2015 (10 years ago); Line 11: 28 December 2024 (19 months ago)

Services
Preceding station	Guangzhou Metro	Following station
Shayuan towards Xincheng Dong	Guangfo line	Shixi towards Lijiao
Jiangtai Road Outer Circle	Line 11	Diyuan Inner Circle
Location

Yangang Station (simplified Chinese: 燕岗站; traditional Chinese: 燕崗站; pinyin: Yāngǎng Zhàn; Cantonese Yale: Yingōng Jaahm), formerly Jiangyan Lu Station (江燕路站), is an interchange station between the Guangfo Metro (Guangfo line) and Line 11 of the Guangzhou Metro. It is located under Gongye Avenue (工业大道) in the Haizhu District of Guangzhou. The Guangfo line station opened on 28 December 2015. It was the eastern terminus of Guangfo line before the remaining section to Lijiao opened on 28 December 2018. The Line 11 station opened on 28 December 2024.

== Station layout ==
=== Line 11 ===
G	-	Exits F & H
L1; Concourse	Transfer passageway	Transfer to Guangfo line
L1; Concourse	11 Lobby	Ticket Machines, Customer Service, Shops, Police Station, Security Facilities
L2	-	Station Equipment
L3; Platforms	Platform 4	11 Inner Circle (Diyuan)
L3; Platforms	Island platform, doors will open on the left (Toilets, Nursery)
L3; Platforms	Platform 3	11 Outer Circle (Jiangtai Road)

=== Guangfo line ===
G	-	Exits B & D
L1; Concourse	Guangfo Lobby	Ticket Machines, Customer Service, Shops, Police Station, Security Facilities, Transfer to Line 11
L2; Platforms	Platform 2	Guangfo towards Xincheng Dong (Shayuan)
L2; Platforms	Island platform, doors will open on the left (Toilets)
L2; Platforms	Platform 1	Guangfo towards Lijiao (Shixi)

=== Entrances/exits ===
The station has 4 points of entry/exit. Exits B and D opened with the station's initial opening. When Line 11 opened, 3 new entrances/exits were incorporated, of which Exits F and H opened. Due to slow construction, Exit E has a postponed opening.

==== Line 11 concourse ====
- F: Quantang Road
- H: Gongye Avenue Middle

==== Guangfo line concourse ====
- B: Gongye Avenue Middle, The Second Affiliated Hospital of Guangzhou Medical University West Campus
- D: Gongye Avenue Middle

Exit D is equipped with an elevator.

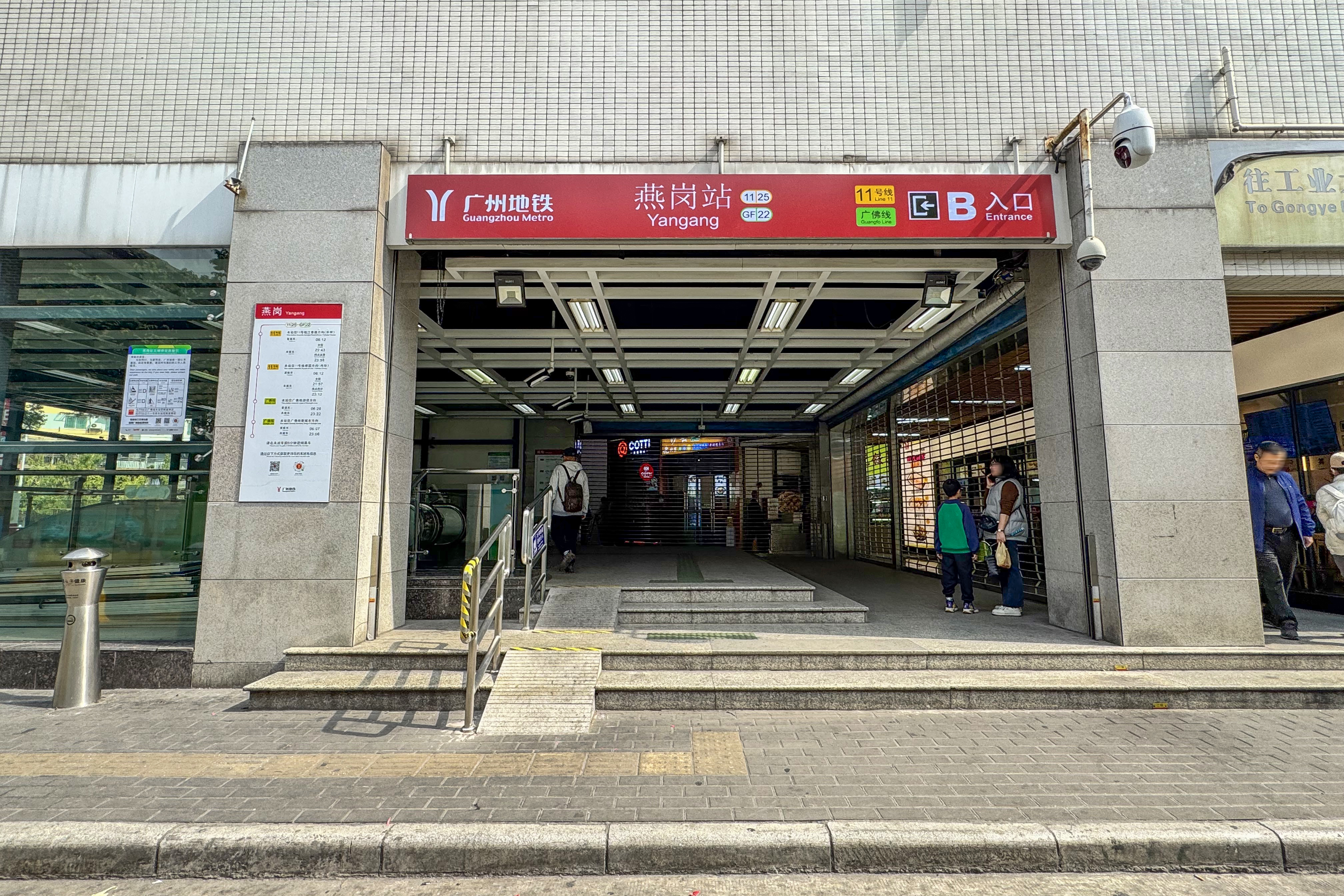
Entrance B

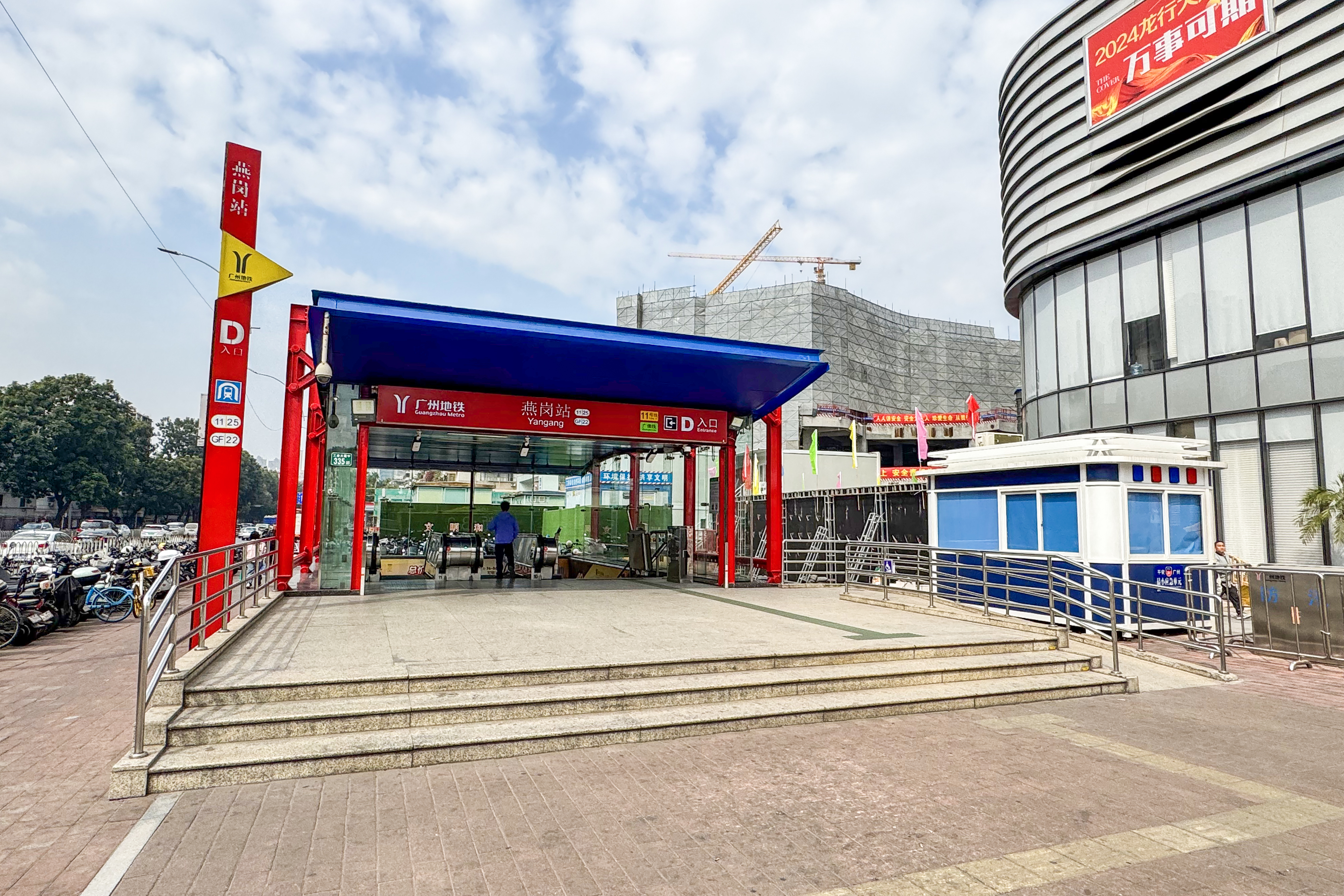
Entrance D

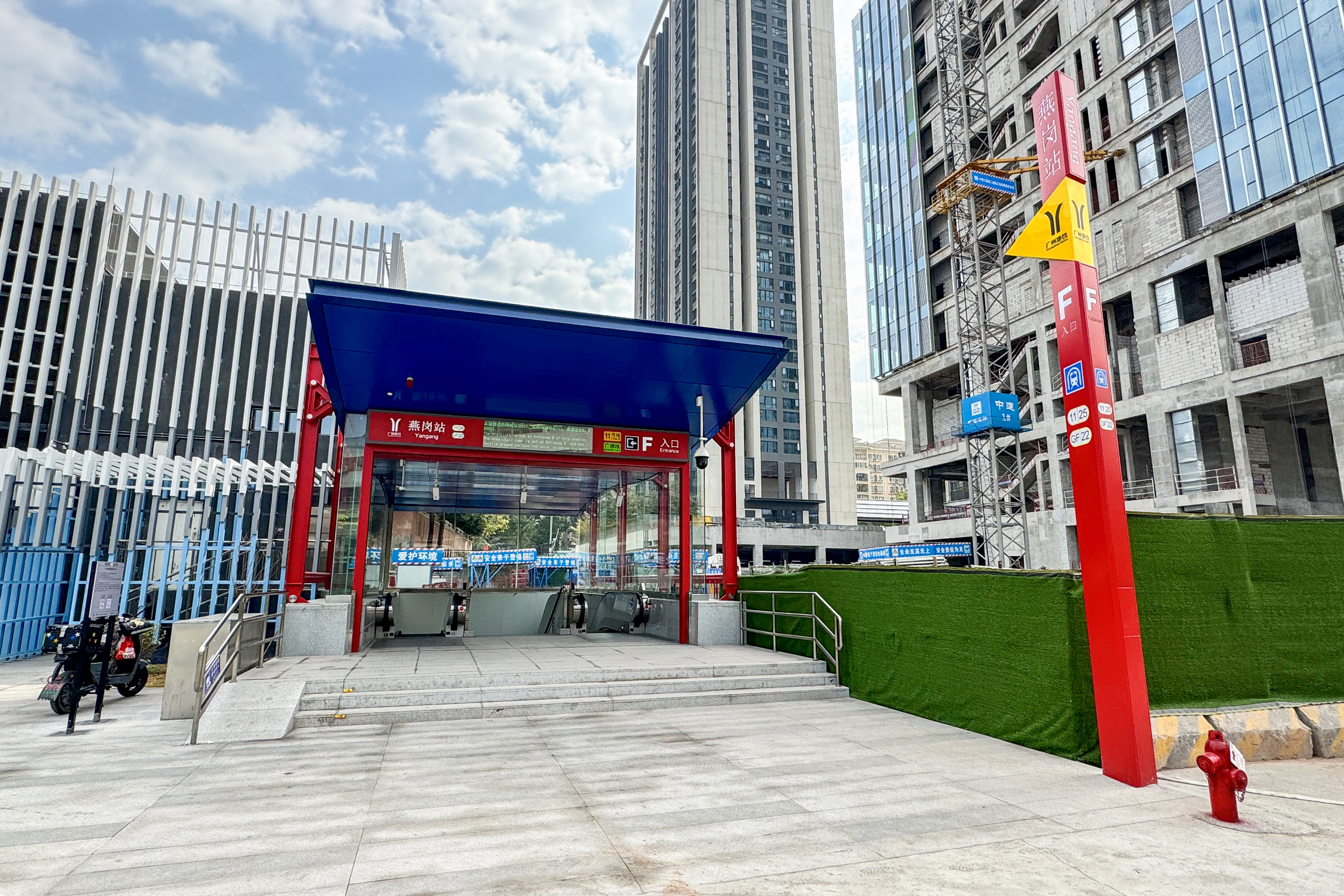
Entrance F

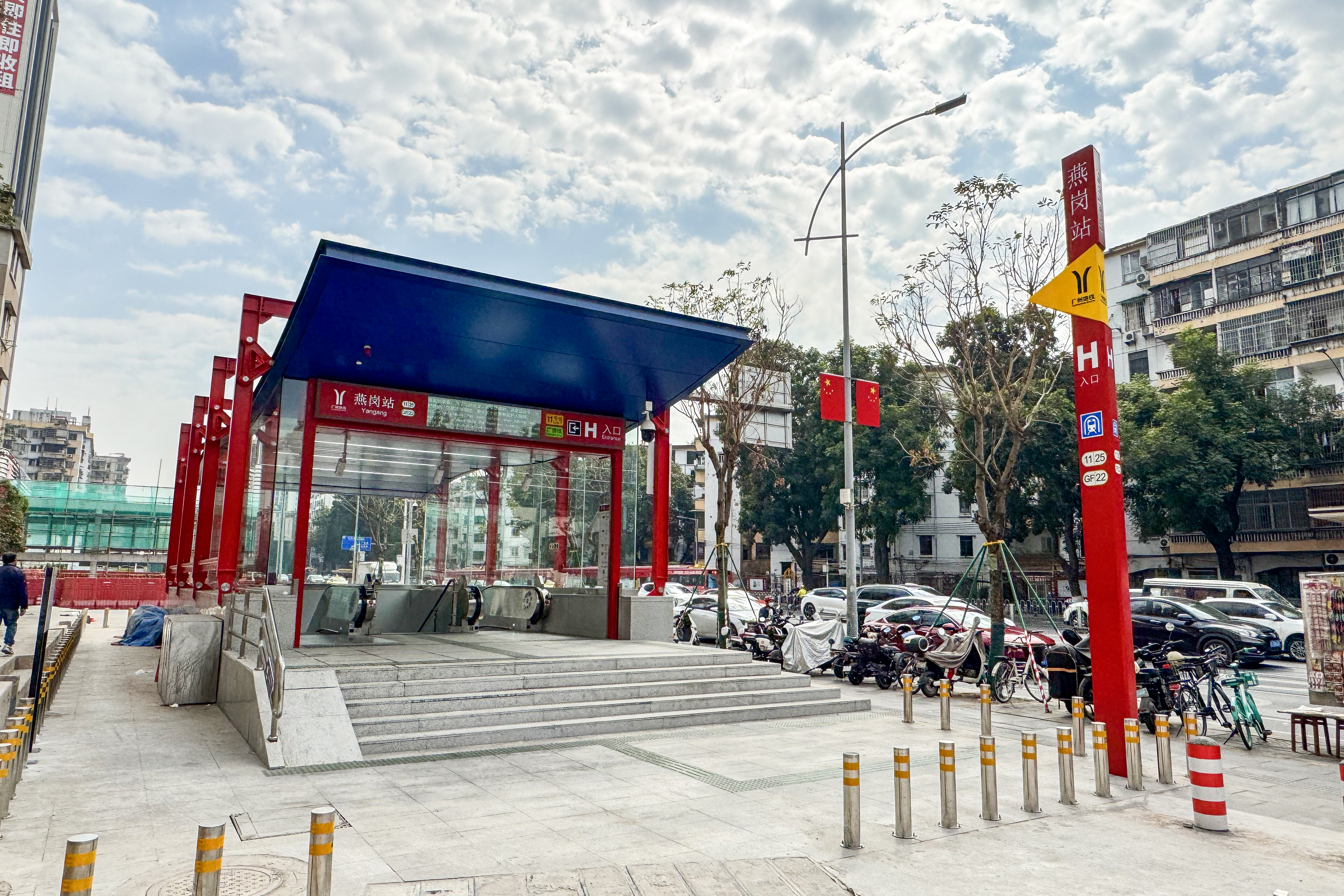
Entrance H

== Gallery ==
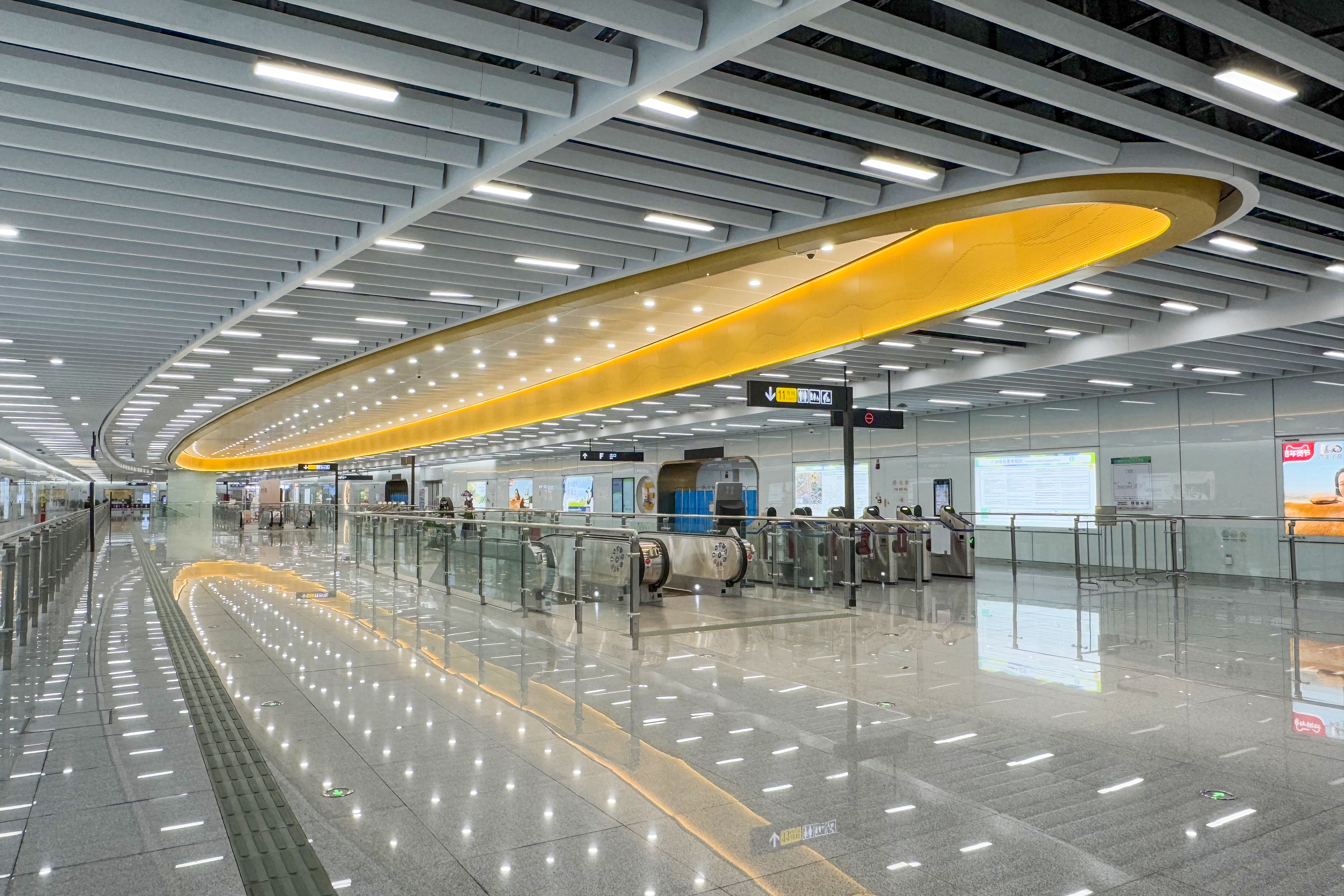
Line 11 concourse

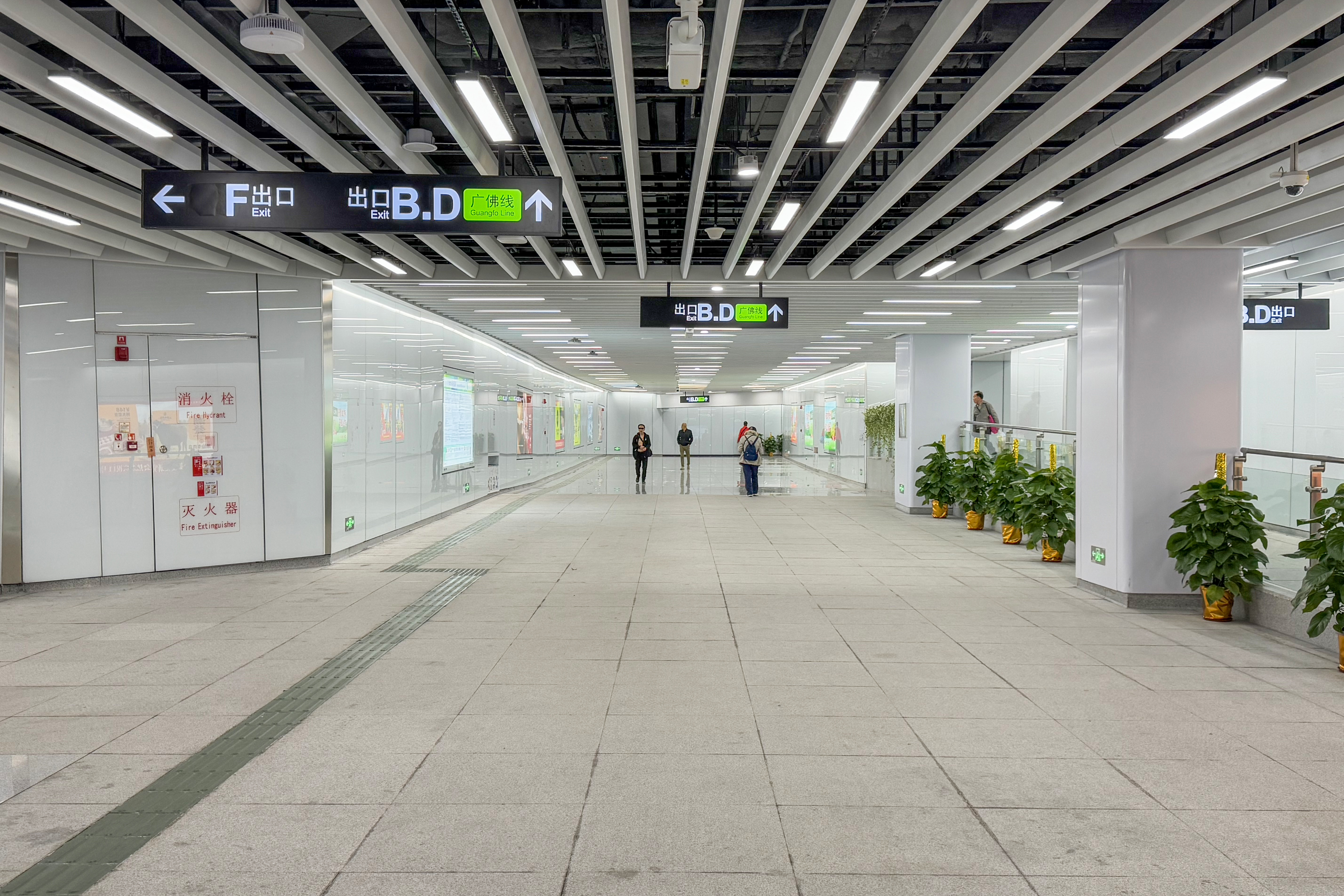
Transfer passageway within paid area

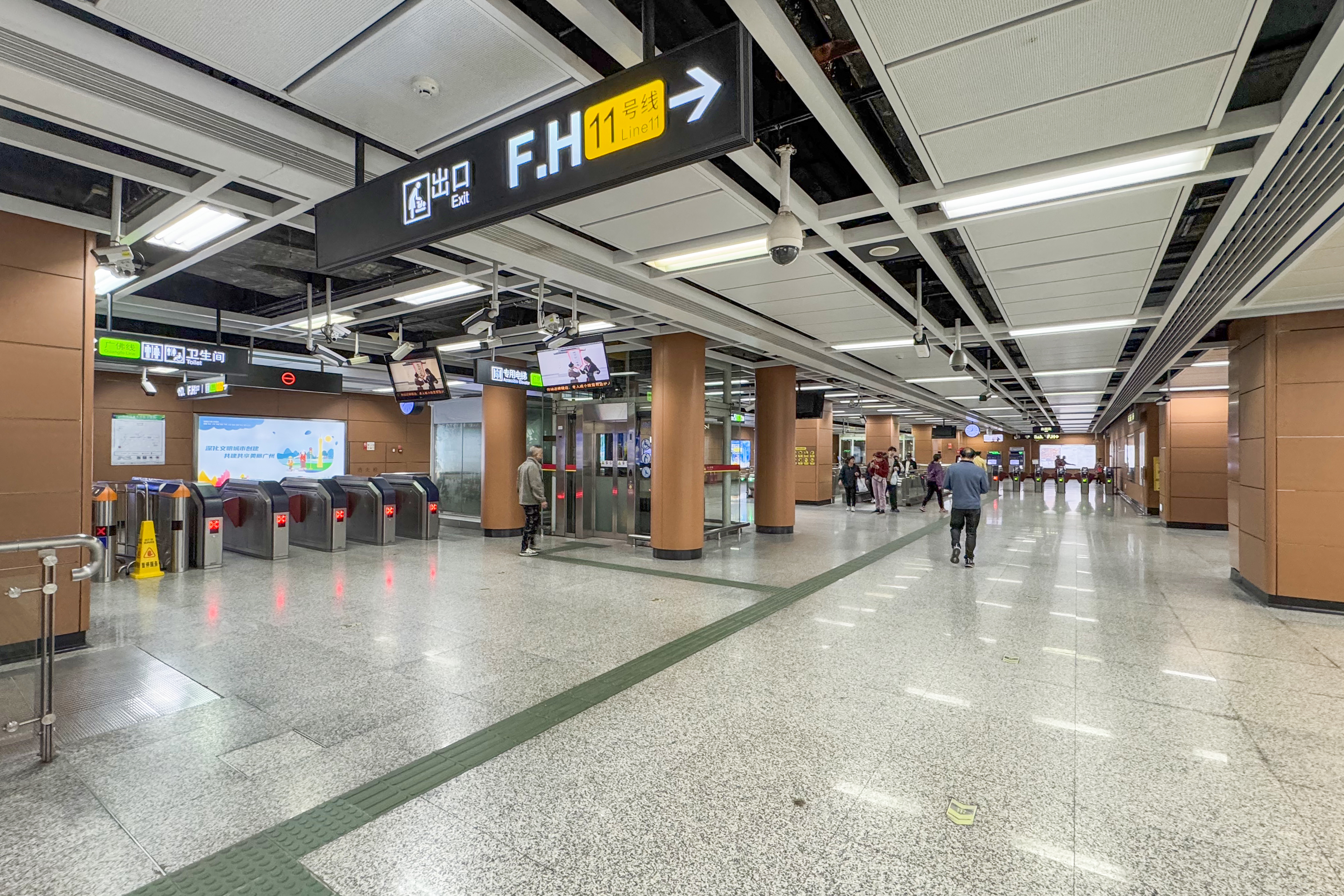
Guangfo line concourse

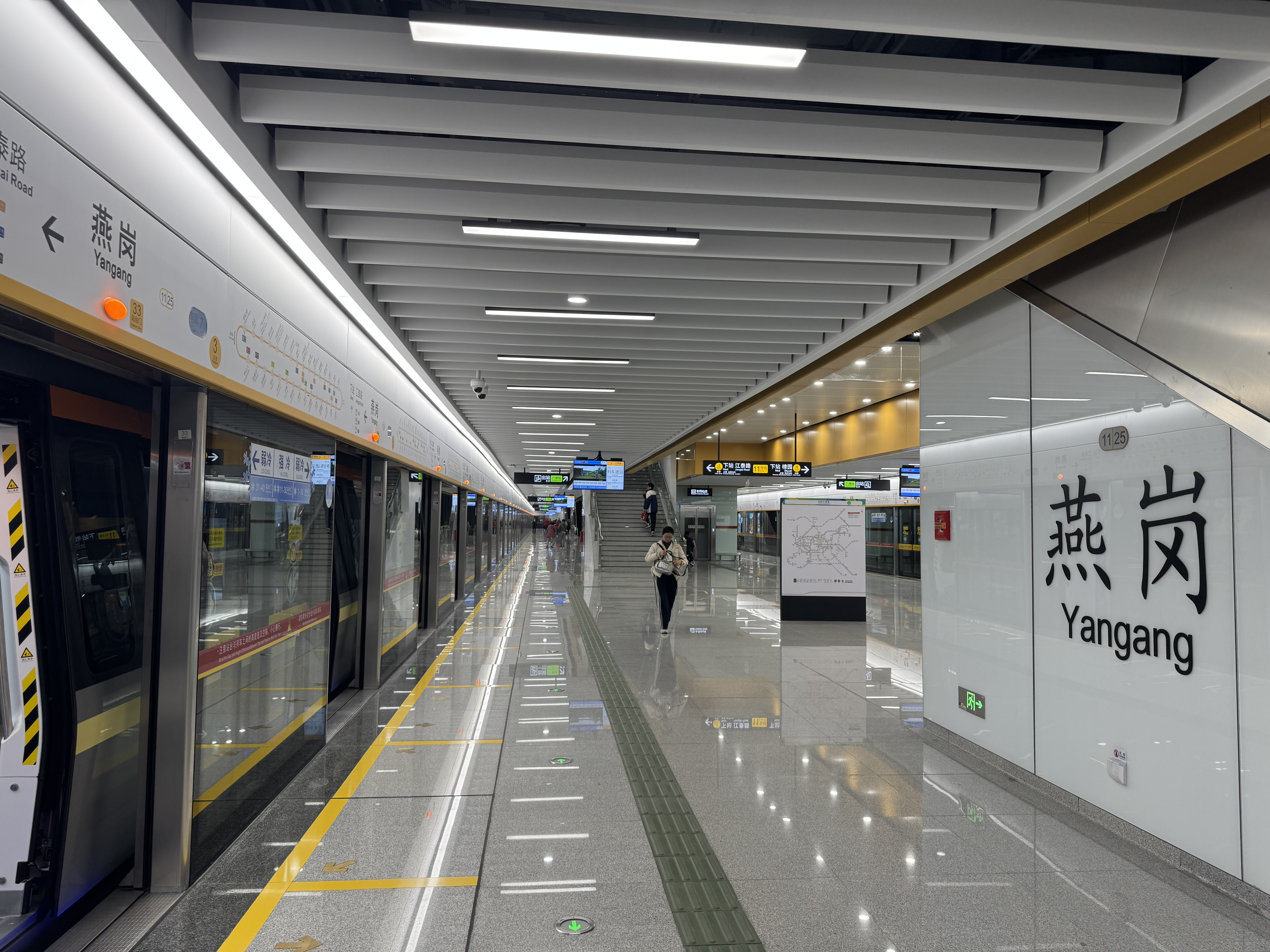
Line 11 platform 3 (Outer Circle platform)

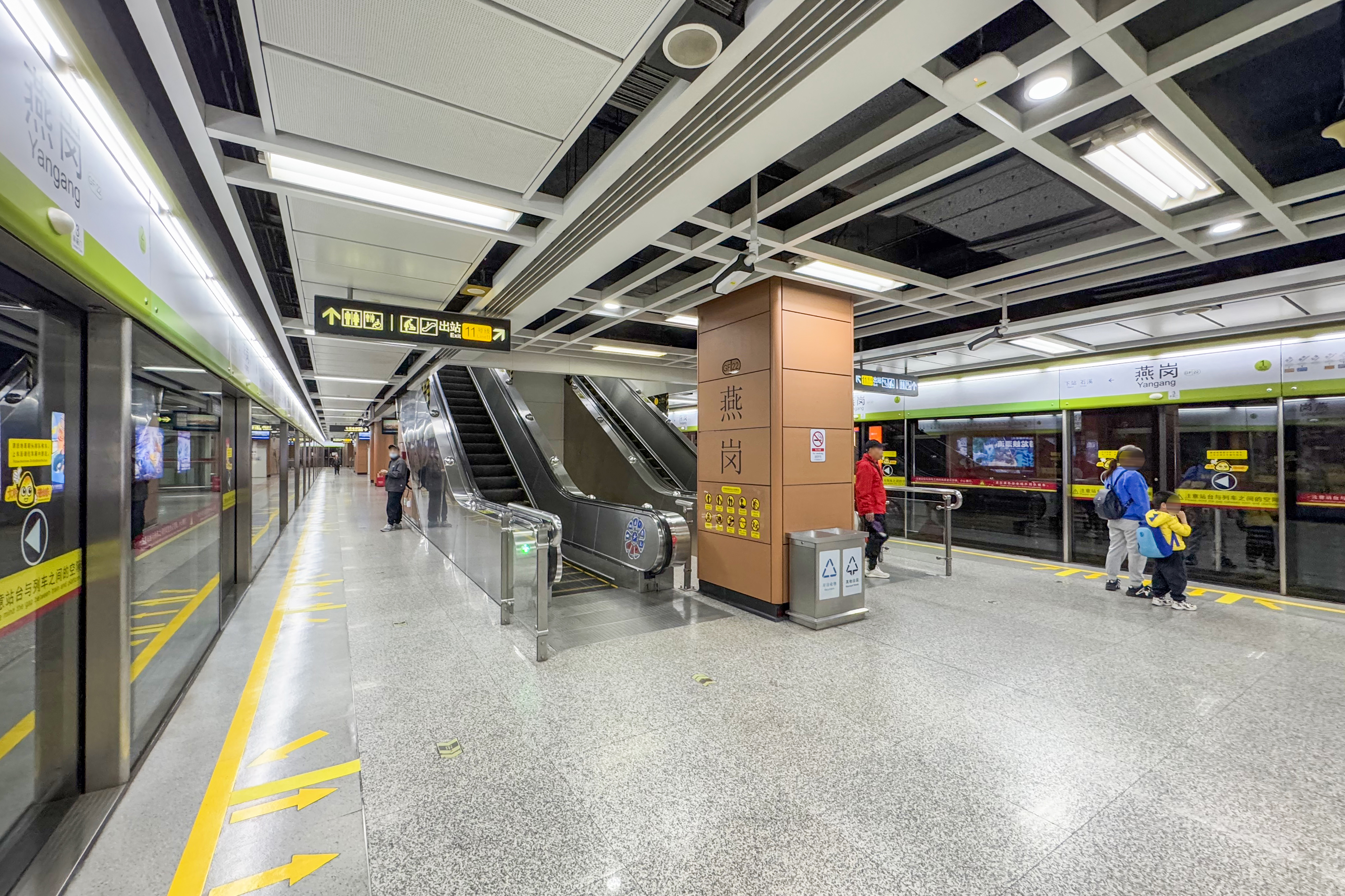
Guangfo line platform

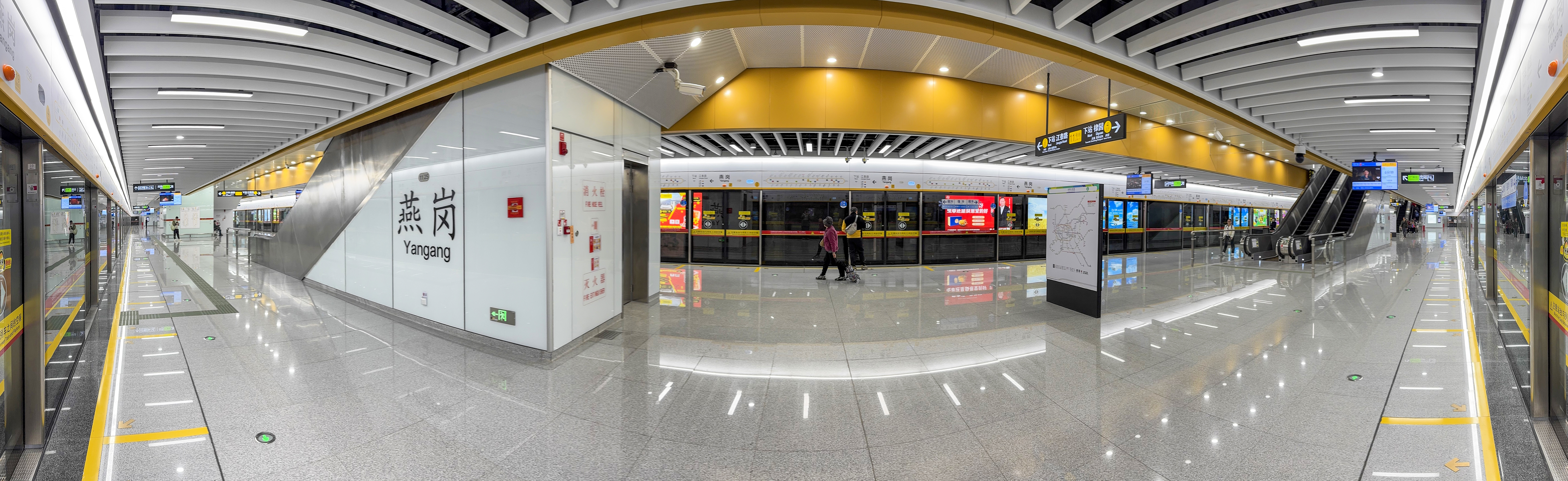
Line 11 platform panorama

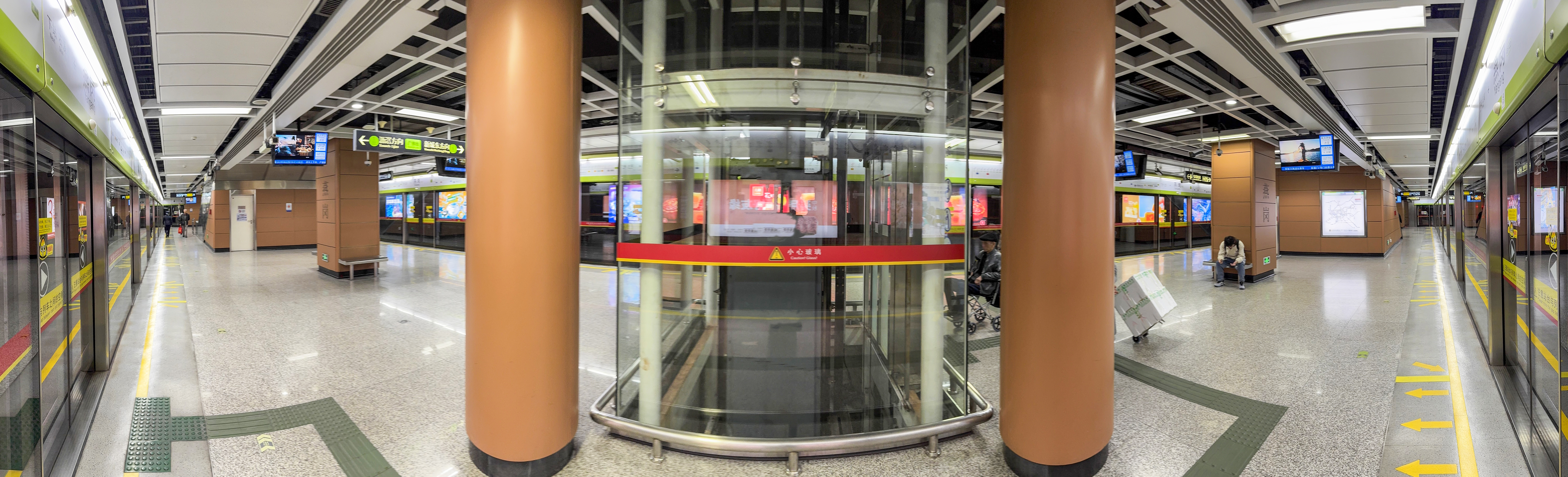
Guangfo line platform panorama

== History ==
In the 2003 subway planning plan, the Central and South sections of the Industrial Avenue were identified as the lines of the Guangzhou section of the Guangzhou-Foshan Metro (Guangfo Metro), and the station appeared as one of the intermediate stations, in which the location was roughly the same as the current one. Subsequently, in the planning of Line 11, there was also a station named Yangang. Although the stations of the two lines was named Yangang at the time, they could only interchange at Shachong Station. The No. 11 environmental review, published in January 2014, showed that the two lines were designed to be far apart from each other at the station in Yanzigang and could not provide an interchange. However, in July 2014, the Guangzhou Municipal Planning Bureau replied to public inquiries that the two lines would be equipped with interchanges at the station, and the Guangzhou Municipal Urban and Rural Construction Commission issued the "Notice on the Construction of Guangzhou Rail Transit Line 11" on September 4, which also added one interchange station compared with the environmental review. Since then, the station has also been adjusted to Quantang Road with the line position, close to the Guangfo line station. At this point, it was officially confirmed that Yangang Station would become one of the interchange stations between Guangfo line and Line 11.

The main station structure of the Guangfo line station was topped out in December 2013. The station started the operation and commissioning stage on 1 July 2015, and opened on December 28 of the same year. Affected by the obstruction of the construction of Lijiao Station, this station was the temporary eastern terminus of Guangfo line for three years. It was not until 28 December 2018 that the remaining section of the rear section of Guangfo line (Yangang to Lijiao) was opened, and this station became a halfway station.

The Line 11 station was topped out on 13 August 2020. The "three rights" transfer was completed on 30 July 2024, and on 28 December, the station was put into use with the opening of Line 11.
