= Line 11 (Foshan Metro) =

Planned rapid transit line in China

- 11

Overview
- Status: Under Planning
- Owner: Foshan Metro Group
- Locale: Guangzhou (Liwan district) and Foshan (Nanhai and Shunde districts); Guangdong
- Termini: Hedong East; Xijiao
- Stations: 21

Service
- Type: Rapid transit
- System: Foshan Metro (FMetro)
- Services: 1

Technical
- Line length: 39.6 km (24.6 mi) (Phase 1)
- Number of tracks: 2
- Character: Underground and elevated
- Track gauge: 1,435 mm (4 ft 8 1/2 in)
- Operating speed: 100 km/h (62 mph)

Line 11 of Foshan Metro (FMetro) (Chinese: 佛山地铁11号线; pinyin: Fóshān Dìtiě Shíyīhàoxiàn) is a line under planning in Foshan. The line will run in a north–south direction, connecting Hedong East in Liwan District in Guangzhou with Xijiao in Shunde District, with 21 stations and 39.6 km (24.6 mi) kilometers of track.

The line is expected to operate 6 car type B trains with a maximum speed of 100 km/h, and will be fully automated and driverless.

== History ==
Line 11 was first planned around 2015 and is positioned to quickly connect downtown Guangzhou with Shunde. Subsequently, the line was selected for the second phase of the Foshan Urban Rail Transit Construction Plan (2021-2026), and a series of preliminary tenders were launched in Foshan and Shunde District. Since then, the line has gradually stabilized, and several interchange stations under construction along the route have reserved part of the structure of the line, and implementation was launched at the end of October 2020.

On 26 January 2021, the construction plan for the second phase of the Foshan Metro was approved, but it only included the Hedong East-Rongqi Ferry section, and could not continue to Ronggui. The construction of the approved section has also been delayed due to the controversy over the direction of the Guangzhou section. In 2023, Shunde District proposed that the Desheng West Road Station, Rongqi Ferry Station, and the section tunnel between the two stations be constructed by the Jinsha Avenue South Extension Line (public rail joint construction) project.

In 2024, Ronggui Subdistrict proposed that the previously unapproved southern extension be included in the construction scope of Line 11, which was supported by Shunde District. On 16 August, the first EIA announcement and public consultation were launched. Compared with the previously approved construction plan, the Guangzhou section has added Guanggang Park station, and the Foshan section has added the previously planned Rongqi Ferry to Xijiao section, but reduced one station within that section.

== Future Development ==
In 2022, the report of the Zhongshan Municipal Government mentioned that it plans to continue the south extension of Foshan Metro Line 11 to Zhongshan.

According to the feasibility study report on the western line of Nanzhuzhong Intercity (Southwest extension of Guangzhou Metro Line 18) approved at the end of February 2023, Shiqi Station and Zhongshan Station will feature transfers to the Zhongshan section of Foshan Line 11.

== Stations ==
Station name		Connections	Future Connections	Location
English	Chinese	Connections	Future Connections	Location
Hedong East	鹤洞东	11 1123		Liwan (Guangzhou)
Guanggang Park	广钢公园			Liwan (Guangzhou)
Huawei	花围	10 1002		Liwan (Guangzhou)
Sanshanxincheng	三山新城			Nanhai (Foshan)
Enterprise City	创智园			Nanhai (Foshan)
Gangkou Lu	港口路		4	Nanhai (Foshan)
Linyue Dong	林岳东	2 F226 TNH1 TNH115		Nanhai (Foshan)
Chencunbei	陈村北	7 701-2		Shunde (Foshan)
Chencundong	陈村东			Shunde (Foshan)
Bijiang	碧江			Shunde (Foshan)
Bijiangnan (reserved)	碧江南			Shunde (Foshan)
Shunde Railway Station	顺德站	ORQ		Shunde (Foshan)
Yongfeng Market	永丰市场			Shunde (Foshan)
Yunlu Park	云路公园			Shunde (Foshan)
Dongle Lu	东乐路	3 F306		Shunde (Foshan)
Nanguo Lu	南国路			Shunde (Foshan)
Baolin Temple	宝林寺			Shunde (Foshan)
Desheng Xilu	德胜西路			Shunde (Foshan)
Rongqi Ferry	容奇渡口			Shunde (Foshan)
Guizhou Dadao	桂洲大道			Shunde (Foshan)
Xijiao	细滘			Shunde (Foshan)
