= Line 11 (Guangzhou Metro) =

Metro line in Guangzhou, China

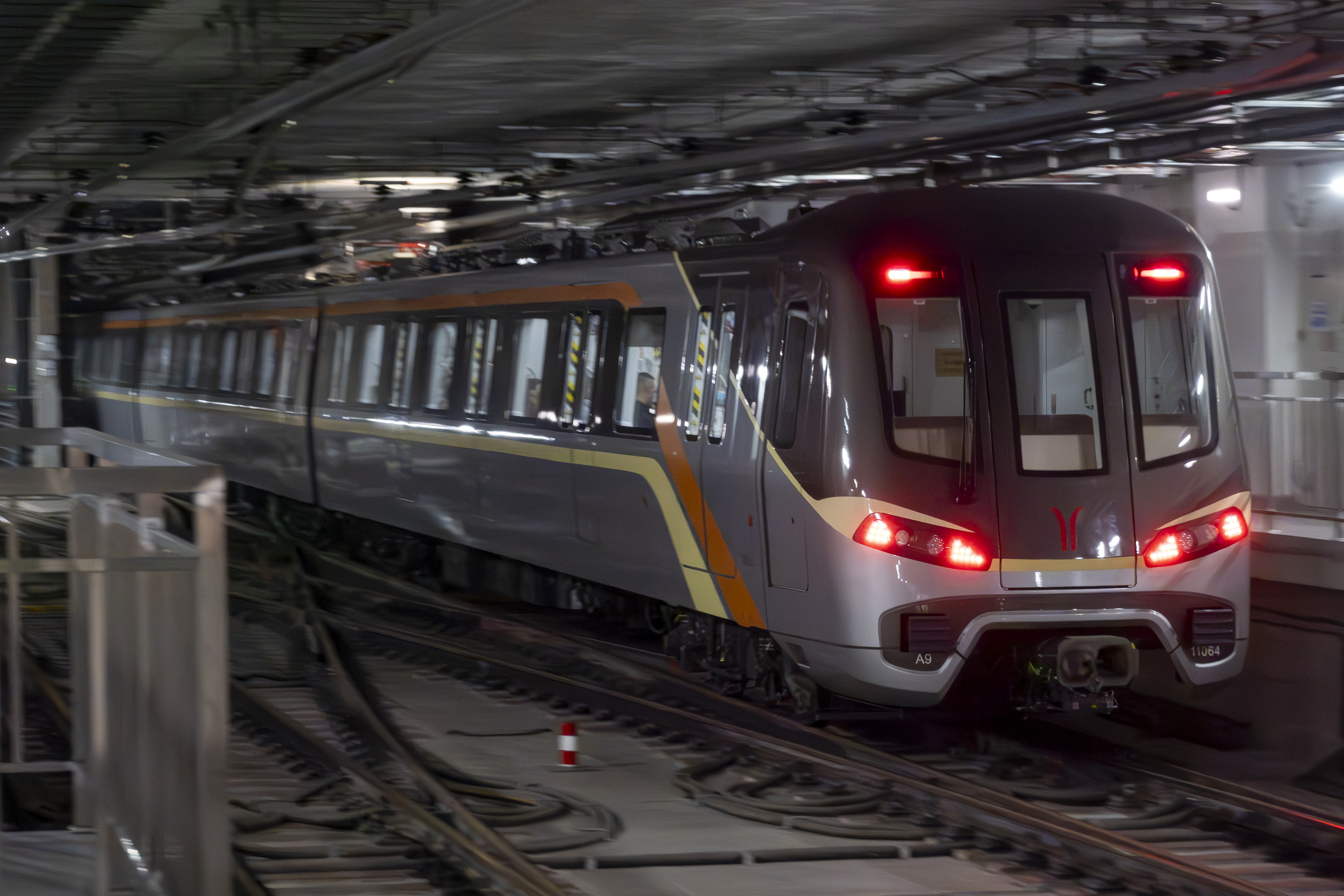
- Line 11 train leaving Chisha station

Overview
- Other name(s): M11 (plan name); Central District Loop Line (Chinese: 中心区环线)
- Status: Operational
- Owner: City of Guangzhou
- Locale: Haizhu, Tianhe, Yuexiu, Baiyun and Liwan districts Guangzhou, Guangdong
- Termini: Loop line (Terminal station: Chisha / Longtan)
- Stations: 30

Service
- Type: Rapid transit
- System: Guangzhou Metro
- Services: 1
- Operator: Guangzhou Metro Corporation
- Daily ridership: 549,000 (2025 daily average)

History
- Opened: 28 December 2024; 22 months ago

Technical
- Line length: 44.2 km (27.5 mi)
- Track gauge: 1,435 mm (4 ft 8 1/2 in)
- Operating speed: 80km/h (Maximum)

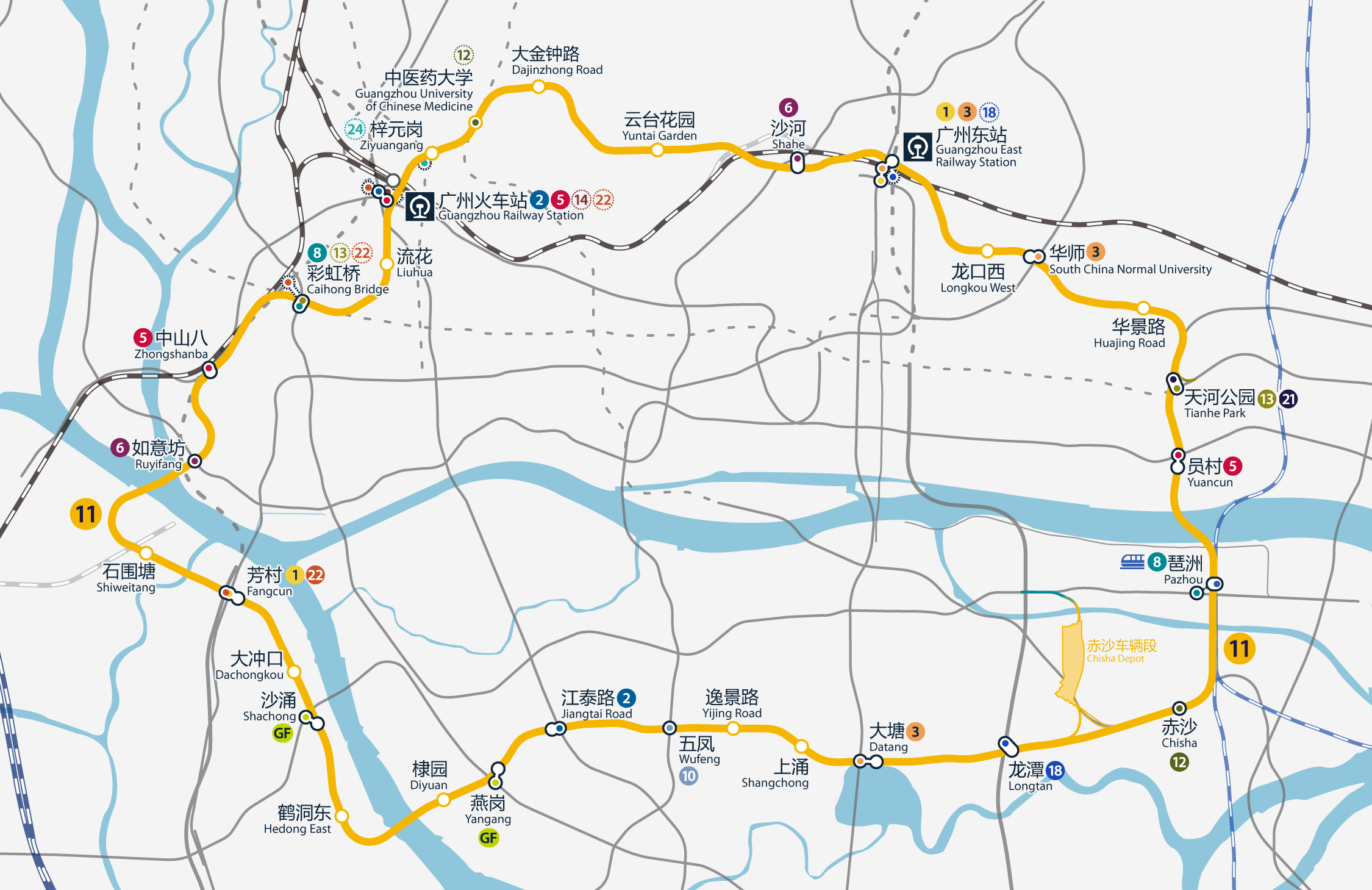
Line 11 drawn to scale

Line 11 of the Guangzhou Metro (Chinese: 广州地铁11号线; pinyin: Guǎngzhōu Dìtiě Shíyīhàoxiàn) is a fully automated rapid transit line in Guangzhou. It is a loop line around the city center, connecting Guangzhou railway station, Guangzhou East railway station, Pazhou, and Fangcun. It opened on 28 December 2024, minus Guangzhou Railway Station due to national rail station renovation requirements from China Railways.

== Route ==
The line forms a 44.2-kilometre (27.5 mi) ring around the edge of the dense central areas of Guangzhou, allowing circumferential and tangential traffic to avoid transferring at the congested city center stations. As such, 19 of the line's 31 stations plan to have transfers with other lines. In addition, the line will act as a distributor for the numerous Pearl River Delta Metropolitan Region intercity railways, and the suburban radial subway lines (Guangzhou Metro Line 14, Line 21, Line 22 and Foshan Metro Line 11) that are expected to terminate at stations on Line 11.

== History ==
=== Planning ===
In 1997 the "Guangzhou City Rapid Rail Transit Network Planning Study (Final Report)" proposed ring line 5 as an alternative to the B program. It followed a closed loop roughly along Newport Road, Changgang Road, Fangcun Avenue, Huangsha Avenue, Huanshi Road and the current Guangzhou New Central Axis. However, the final recommendation was for the A-ring program, so it was not adopted.

In 2008, a new round of rail transit network planning again proposed a loop line. Again, there were two options, a smaller 35.5 km (22.1 mi) loop or a larger 40 km (25 mi), which would cross the Pearl River once more to serve the Baietan area in Fangcun. Both would serve the two railway stations (Guangzhou and Guangzhou East) and were proposed to take over Line 8 as the southern part of the loop.

In 2009, plans had evolved to an "extra large" loop line. This largely followed the 2008 large loop plan, however the southern section was realigned further south, no longer taking over the tracks of Line 8. In 2010, this plan gained traction, being added to the 2011-2015 Rail Transit Construction Plan as Line 11.

In 2013, as part of a feasibility study for the line, three more stations (Zhoumen, Shangchong and Huangpuchong) were proposed to be added to the 32 from previous plans. By the end of the year, it was committed to adding Shangchong only as well as removing the station at Ruibaoxiang, keeping the station count at 32. At the same time, the line was also realigned reduce environmental impact on Baiyun Mountain and Haizhu Wetland.

In December 2015, it was revealed due to opposition by local residents and therefore difficulties in land acquisition, Yuexiu District had suggested that city authorities cancel the station at Tianxincun. However, in September 2016 it was announced the station would proceed as planned. In September 2024, with all efforts to acquire land for the station having failed, Guangzhou Metro announced the station had been cancelled.

In 2014, it was realised that as Line 21 was progressing much faster than Line 11, an important interchange between the two lines at Tianhe Park would be unavailable when Line 21 opened. To resolve this, it was decided to have the section of Line 11 between Tianhe Park and Yuancun be built as part of Line 21, and Line 21 would provide service on this section until Line 11 was ready.

=== Construction ===
Line 11 received planning approval in July 2015, allowing construction to begin. Construction finally started on 28 September 2016 at Hedong East station, but it was reported further delays were expected at a number of other sites due to difficulties with land acquisition.

The main structure of Yuntai Garden station was completed on 28 November 2019, the first on Line 11.

With construction 98% complete, the aforementioned Tianhe Park - Yuancun section was closed on 2 October 2024 to be connected to Line 11.

The full circle line, excluding the national railway interchange stations at Guangzhou East Railway Station and Guangzhou Railway Station (for overhauls of these two railway stations), opened on 28 December 2024. Guangzhou East Railway Station opened on 29 September 2025. The opening date of Guangzhou Railway Station has not yet been determined due to cooperation with railway station renovation requirements.

=== Opening timeline ===
Segment	Commencement	Length	Station(s)
Yuancun — Tianhe Park (as part of Line 21)	20 December 2019	1.37 km (0.85 mi)	2
Yuancun — Tianhe Park (temporary closure)	2 October 2024	−1.37 km (−0.85 mi)	-2
Chisha — Tianhe Park — Chisha (full circular line)	28 December 2024	44.2 km (27.46 mi)	29
Guangzhou East Railway Station	29 September 2025	Infill station	1
Guangzhou Railway Station	To be determined	Infill station	1

== Stations ==
Station No.	Station name		Connections	Future Connections	Location (District)
Station No.	English	Chinese	Connections	Future Connections	Location (District)
— ↑ Loop line towards Longtan ↑ —
1101	Chisha	赤沙	12 1221		Haizhu
1102	Pazhou	琶洲	8 827 ER PL	28	Haizhu
1103	Yuancun	员村	5 516		Tianhe
1104	Tianhe Park	天河公园	13 1320 21 2102		Tianhe
1105	Huajing Road	华景路			Tianhe
1106	South China Normal University	华师	3 314 (Operated by Line 10 in the future)	10	Tianhe
1107	Longkou West	龙口西			Tianhe
1108	Guangzhou East Railway Station	广州东站	1 116 3 318; GGQ	18	Tianhe
1109	Shahe	沙河	6 618		Tianhe
1110	Yuntai Garden	云台花园			Yuexiu
1111	Dajinzhong Road	大金钟路			Baiyun
1112	Guangzhou University of Chinese Medicine	中医药大学		12 1212	Baiyun
1113	Ziyuangang	梓元岗		24	Baiyun
1114	Guangzhou Railway Station (Note: To cooperate with the planned renovation of the respective national railway station, trains will not stop at Guangzhou Railway Station.)	广州火车站	2 216 5 506; GZQ	14 1401 22	Yuexiu
1115	Liuhua	流花			Yuexiu
1116	Caihong Bridge	彩虹桥	8 811	13 1309 22	Liwan
1117	Zhongshanba	中山八	5 503		Liwan
1118	Ruyifang	如意坊	6 606		Liwan
1119	Shiweitang	石围塘			Liwan
1120	Fangcun	芳村	1 104 22 2208	28	Liwan
1121	Dachongkou	大冲口			Liwan
1122	Shachong	沙涌	Guangfo GF20		Liwan
1123	Hedong East	鹤洞东		11	Liwan
1124	Diyuan	棣园			Haizhu
1125	Yangang	燕岗	Guangfo GF22		Haizhu
1126	Jiangtai Road	江泰路	2 208		Haizhu
1127	Wufeng	五凤	10 1007		Haizhu
1128	Yijing Road	逸景路			Haizhu
1129	Shangchong	上涌			Haizhu
1130	Datang	大塘	3 307		Haizhu
1131	Longtan	龙潭	18 1806		Haizhu
— ↓ Loop line towards Chisha ↓ —

== Operations ==
=== Timetable ===
As Line 11 is a circular line, services are branded as "inner circle" (clockwise) or "outer circle" (anticlockwise). Station signage also shows a "midpoint station" for each direction, which is the last station where it is faster to use that direction.

The full loop is timetabled for 75 minutes, with headways around 5m 22s (weekday peak), 7m 30s (weekday offpeak) and 6m 15s (weekend peak). Generally trains operate continuously around the loop, except for the start and end of peak periods, where trains may start or end at Chisha or Longtan stations.

=== Rollingstock ===
Due to the large number of connections and destinations, the line is expected to have a ridership of over 1.2 million passengers per day. To cope with the projected high demand, engineers designed the line to be the second in the system to use high-capacity 8-car wide-body type A trains.

In 2020, all Line 8 trains were moved out of Chisha depot to a new depot at Baiyun Lake, allowing construction to start on a link from the southern end of the depot to Line 11 between Chisha and Longtan stations. The first train for Line 11 was delivered to the newly renovated depot on 2 January 2024.
