= Huawei station =

Huawei station may refer to:

- Huawei station (Guangzhou Metro) (Chinese: 花围站)
- Huawei station (Shenzhen Metro) (Chinese: 华为站)
