= Dongsha station =

Guangzhou Metro Line 10 station

Dongsha 东沙
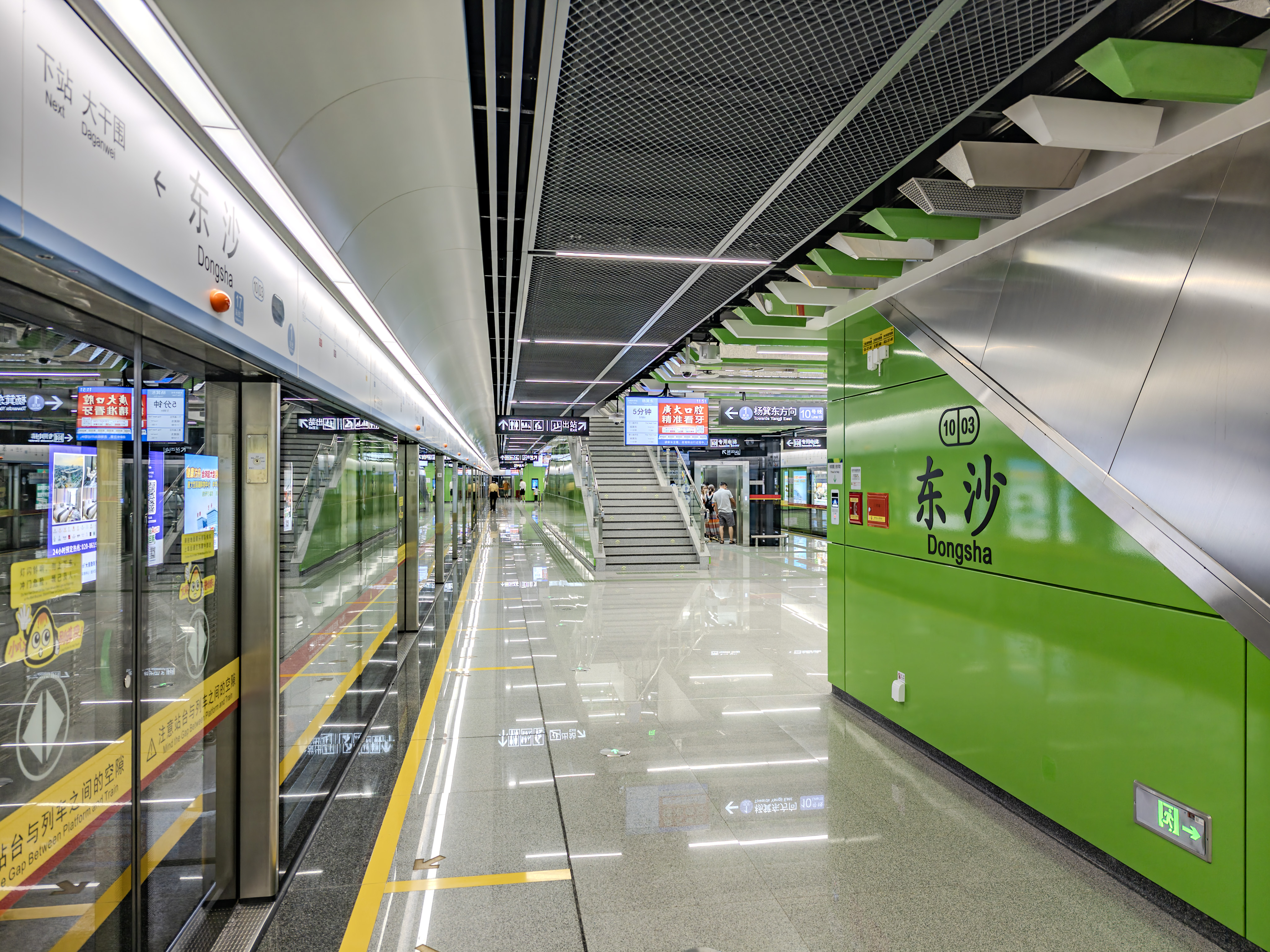
- Platform

Chinese name
- Simplified Chinese: 东沙站
- Traditional Chinese: 東沙站
Transcriptions
Standard Mandarin
- Hanyu Pinyin: Dōngshā Zhàn
Yue: Cantonese
- Yale Romanization: Dūngsāa Jaahm
- Jyutping: Dung^{1}saa^{1} Zaam^{6}
- Hong Kong Romanization: Tung Sha station

General information
- Location: West side of the intersection of Cuiyuan Road (翠园路) and Dongsha Road (东沙路); Dongsha Subdistrict, Liwan District, Guangzhou, Guangdong; China
- Coordinates: 23°3′34.6″N 113°15′32.44″E
- Operator: Guangzhou Metro Co. Ltd.
- Line: Line 10
- Platforms: 2 (1 island platform)
- Tracks: 2

Construction
- Structure type: Underground
- Accessible: Yes

Other information
- Station code: 1003

History
- Opened: 29 June 2025 (13 months ago)

Services
Preceding station	Guangzhou Metro	Following station
Huawei towards Xilang	Line 10	Daganwei towards Yangji East
Location

Dongsha station (simplified Chinese: 东沙站; traditional Chinese: 東沙站; Jyutping: dung^{1} saa^{1} zaam^{6}; Cantonese Yale: Dūngsāa Jaahm) is a station on Line 10 of the Guangzhou Metro. It is located under the west side of the intersection of Cuiyuan Road and Dongsha Road in Guangzhou's Liwan District. It opened on 29 June 2025.

== Station layout ==
This station is a two-storey underground station. The ground level is the exit, and it is surrounded by Cuiyuan Road, Dongsha Road, Guangzhou International Pharmaceutical Exhibition and Trade Center and other nearby buildings. The first floor is the concourse, and the second floor is the platform for Line 10.

G	-	Exits A, B, C
L1; Concourse	Lobby	Ticket Machines, Customer Service, Shops, Police Station, Security Facilities
L2; Platforms	Platform 2	10 towards Xilang (Huawei)
L2; Platforms	Island platform, doors will open on the left (Toilets, Nursery)
L2; Platforms	Platform 1	10 towards Yangji East (Daganwei)

=== Concourse ===
There are automatic ticket machines and an AI customer service center at the concourse. There are elevators, escalators, and stairs in the fare-paid area for passengers to reach the platform.

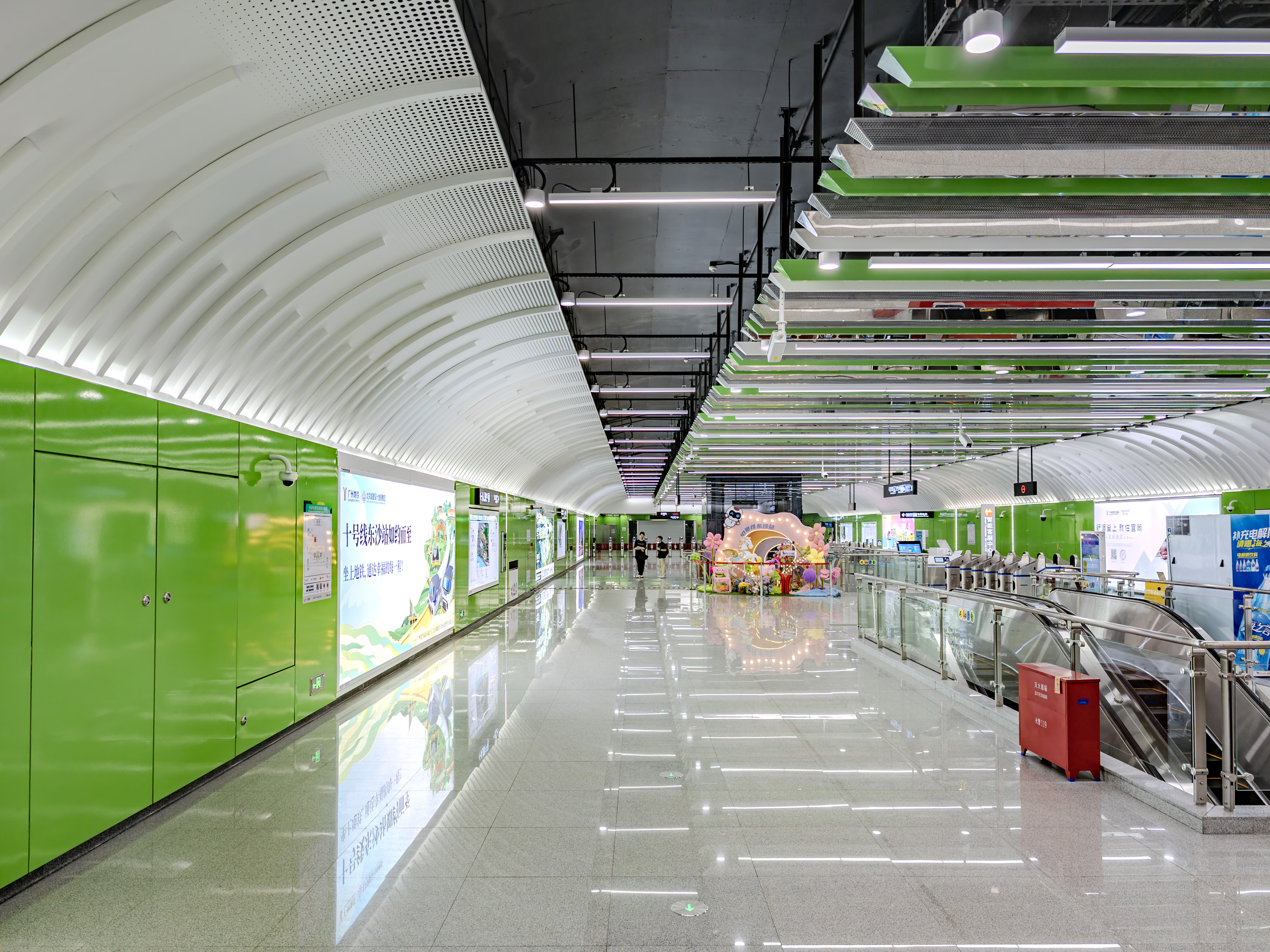
Concourse

=== Platform ===
The station has an island platform located under Cuiyuan Road. Toilets and a nursery room are located at the end of the platform towards Huawei.

=== Entrances/exits ===
The station has 3 points of entry/exit. Exit A is equipped with an elevator.

- A: Cuiyuan Road
- B: Cuiyuan Road
- C: Cuiyuan Road
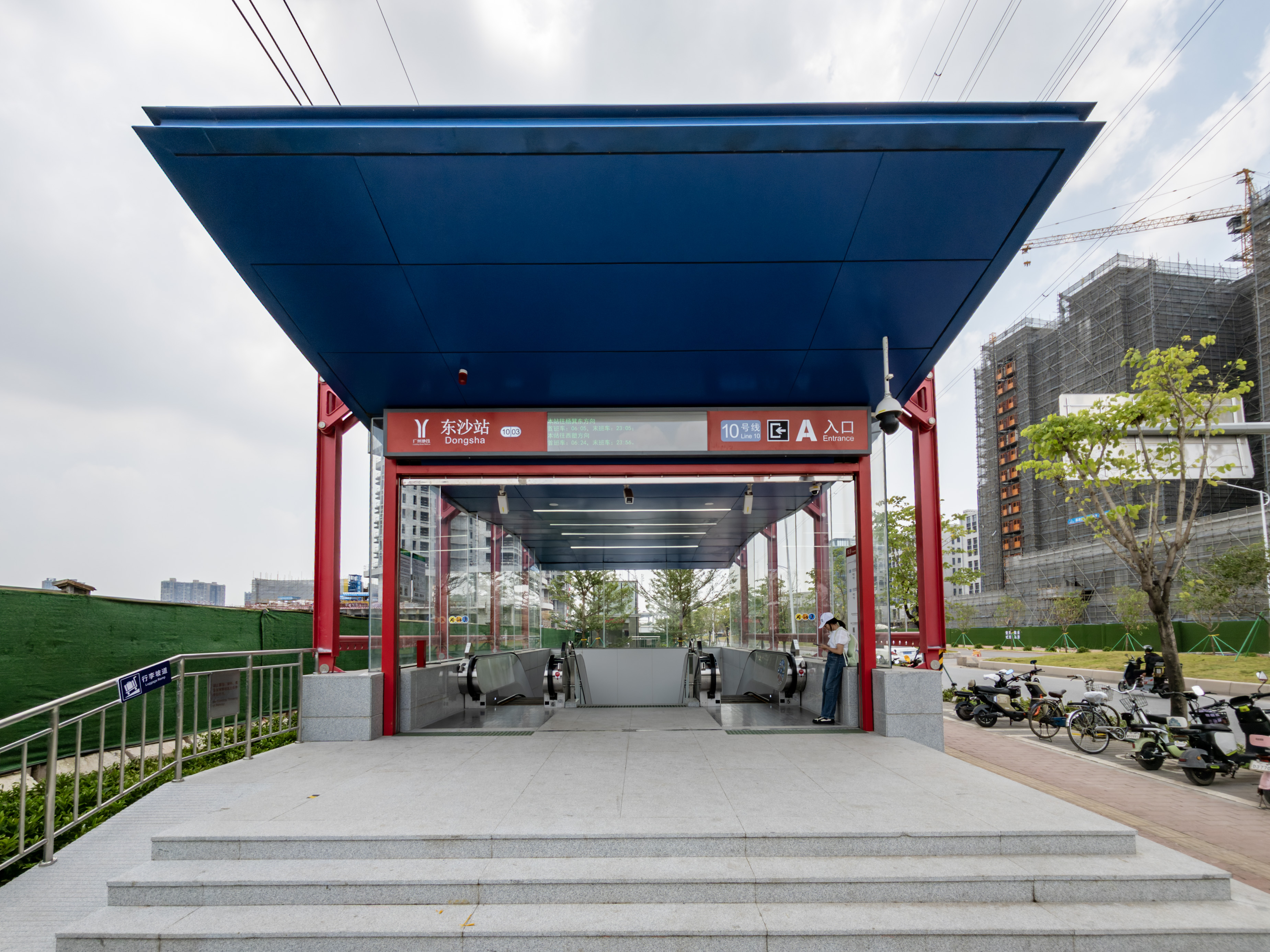
Entrance A

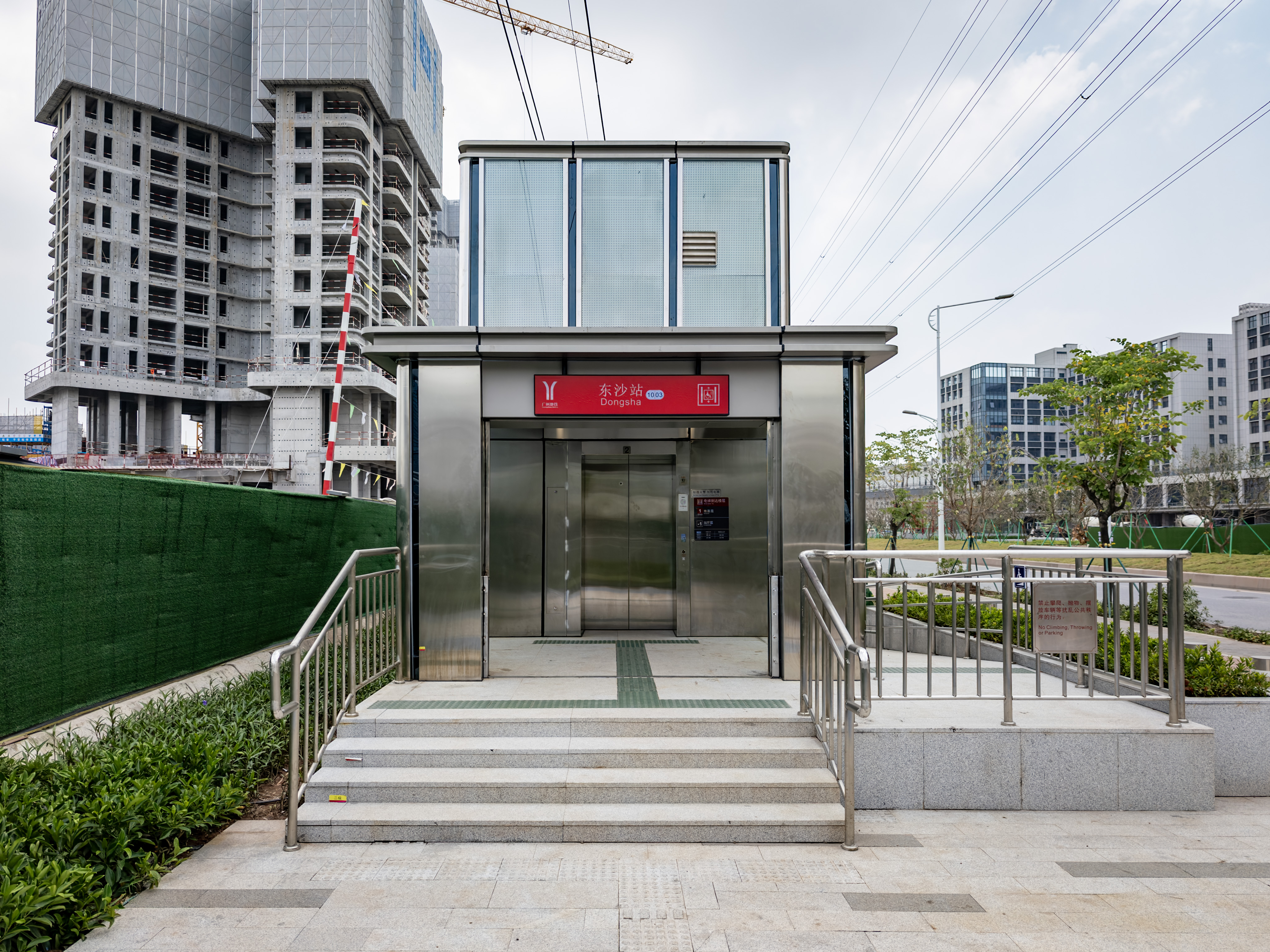
Elevator of Entrance A

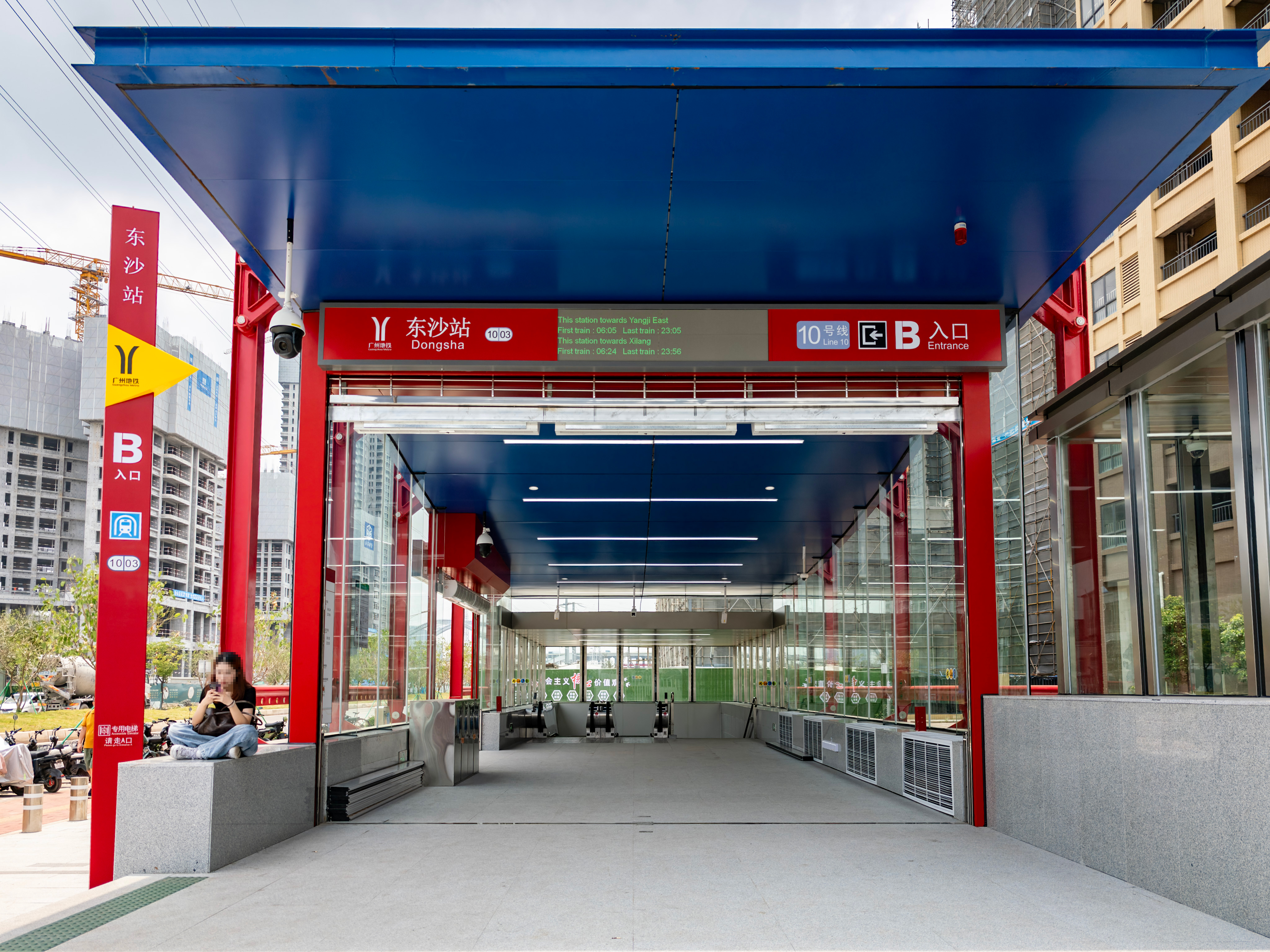
Entrance B

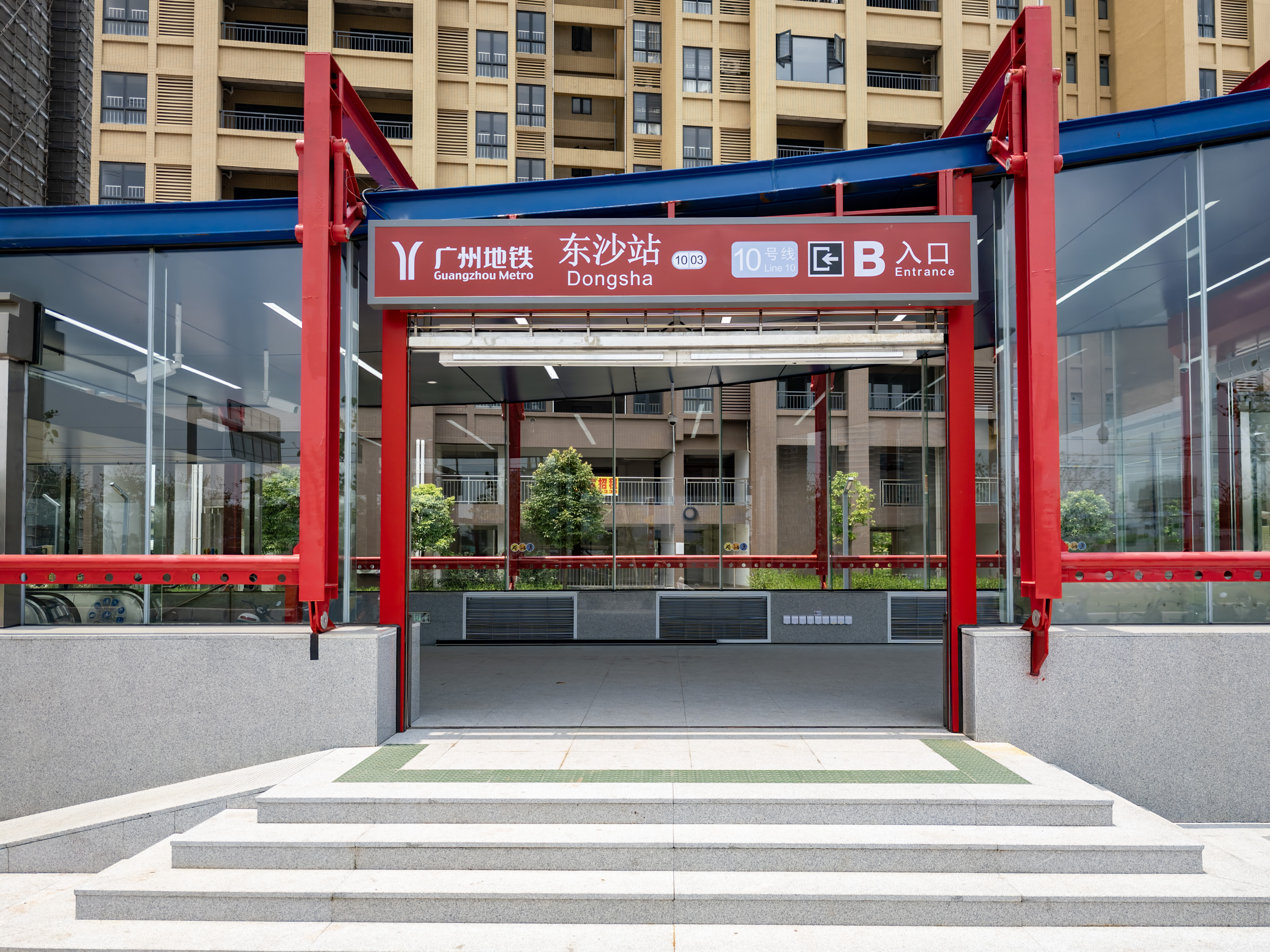
Entrance B (side entrance)

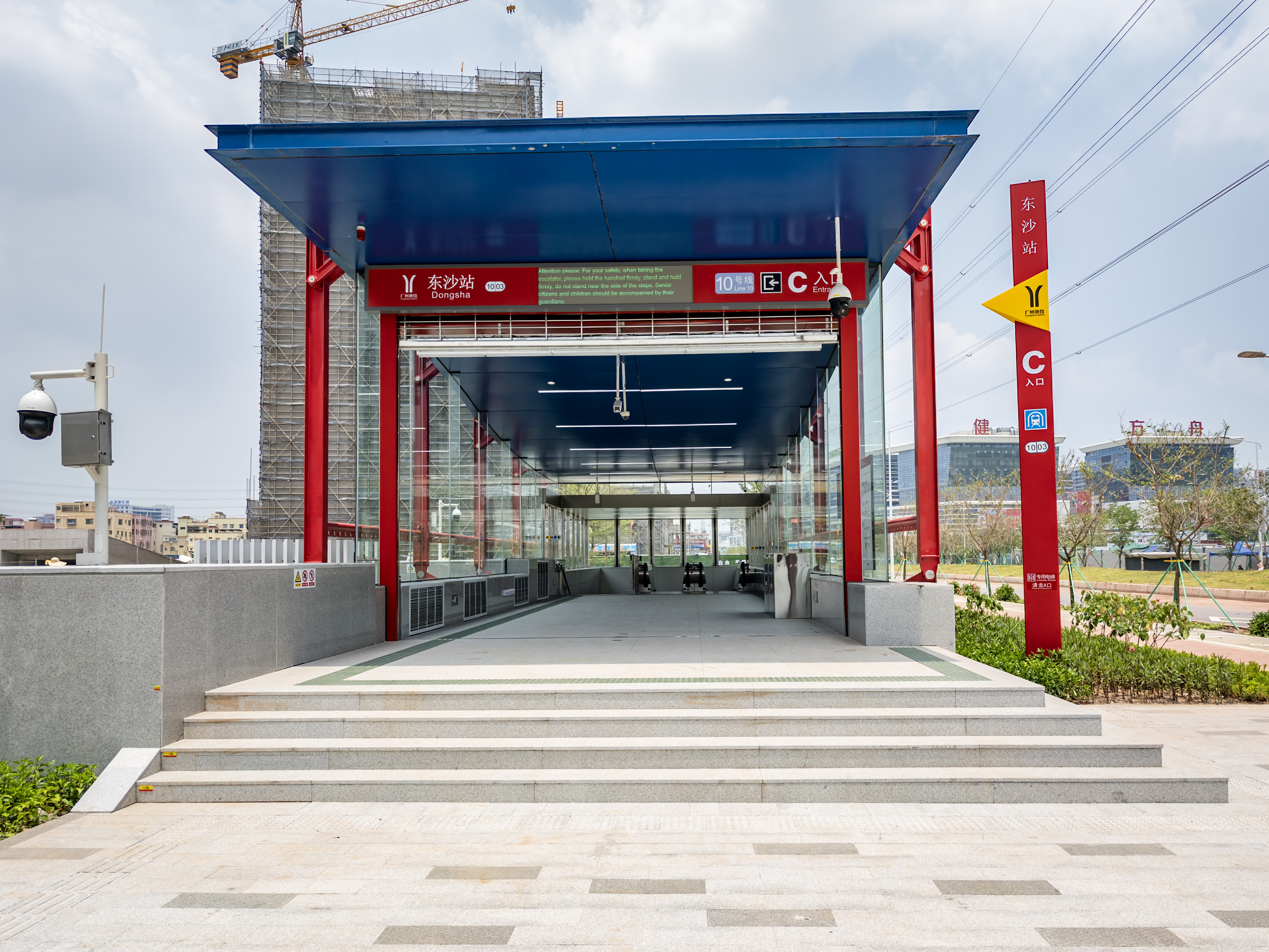
Entrance C

== History ==
The station had the fastest progress out of any station during the construction of Line 10 after its construction started on 26 June 2019. The enclosure structure was completed in April 2020. On 28 July 2021, the roof slab was sealed, becoming the first topped-out station of Line 10. On 30 December 2024, the station completed the "three rights" transfer.

During planning and construction, the station was called Dongsha station. In April 2025, the Guangzhou Municipal Transportation Bureau announced the preliminary station names for Line 10, and the station is planned to continue to use the name Dongsha. Since this station is located in Shaluo Village, and the Dongsha Subdistrict Office is located next to the adjacent Huawei Station, many people have suggested using Shaluo as the station name. In the following month, the authorities did not adopt the relevant recommendation on the grounds that "the naming guidelines were not clear", and the station name of this station was kept as Dongsha station.

The station opened on 29 June 2025.
