= Huawei station (Guangzhou Metro) =

Guangzhou Metro Line 10 station

Huawei 花围
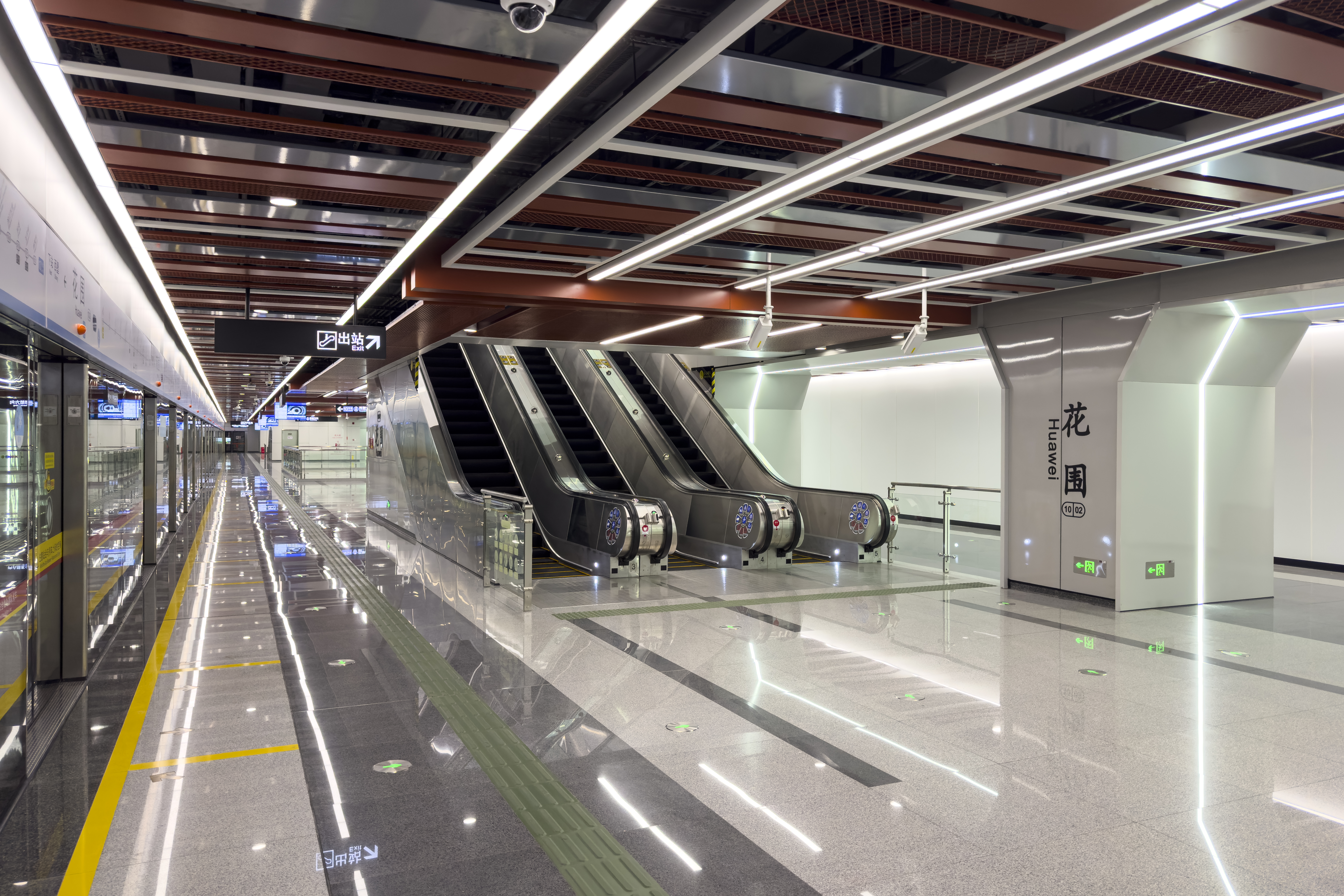
- Platform 2 (towards Xilang)

Chinese name
- Simplified Chinese: 花围站
- Traditional Chinese: 花圍站
Transcriptions
Standard Mandarin
- Hanyu Pinyin: Huāwéi Zhàn
Yue: Cantonese
- Yale Romanization: Fāwàih Jaahm
- Jyutping: Faa^{1}wai^{4} Zaam^{6}
- Hong Kong Romanization: Fa Wai station

General information
- Location: Intersection of Yulan Road (玉兰路) and a planned road Dongjiao Subdistrict, Guangzhou, Liwan District, Guangzhou, Guangdong; China
- Coordinates: 23°3′37.0598″N 113°14′21.7266″E
- Operator: Guangzhou Metro Co. Ltd.
- Lines: Line 10; Line 11 (future)
- Platforms: 2 (2 island platforms) (Note: the reserved Line 10 branch platforms are enclosed on the inner side)
- Tracks: 2

Construction
- Structure type: Underground
- Accessible: Yes

Other information
- Station code: 1002

History
- Opened: 29 June 2025 (13 months ago)
- Former names: Guanggang New Town (广钢新城)

Services
Preceding station	Guangzhou Metro	Following station
Xilang Terminus	Line 10	Dongsha towards Yangji East
Location

Huawei station (simplified Chinese: 花围站; traditional Chinese: 花圍站; Jyutping: faa^{1} wai^{4} zaam^{6}; Cantonese Yale: Fāwàih Jaahm) is a station on Line 10 of the Guangzhou Metro. It is located under the intersection of Yulan Road and a planned road, south of Guanggang New Town Depot in Guangzhou's Liwan District. It opened on 29 June 2025.

== Station layout ==
This station is a three-storey underground station. The ground level is the exit, and it is surrounded by Yulan Road (southern extension of Chongwen 4th Road), Guanggang New Town Depot, planned TOD and other nearby buildings. The first floor is the concourse, the second floor is the platform for Line 10 and the third floor is the reserved platform structure for Foshan Metro Line 11.

G	-	Exits A, B, C, D
L1; Concourse	Lobby	Ticket Machines, Customer Service, Shops, Police Station, Security Facilities
L2; Platforms	Platform 2	10 towards Xilang (terminus)
L2; Platforms	Island platform, doors will open on the left (Toilets, Nursery)
L2; Platforms		Reserved for 10 branch (enclosed)
L2; Platforms		Reserved for 10 branch (enclosed)
L2; Platforms	Island platform, doors will open on the left (Toilets, Nursery)
L2; Platforms	Platform 1	10 towards Yangji East (Dongsha)
L3; 11 Reserved Platforms		11 reserved track area
L3; 11 Reserved Platforms	Reserved Island platform
L3; 11 Reserved Platforms		11 reserved track area

=== Concourse ===
There are automatic ticket machines and an AI customer service center at the concourse. There are elevators, escalators, and stairs in the fare-paid area for passengers to reach the two platforms in different directions.

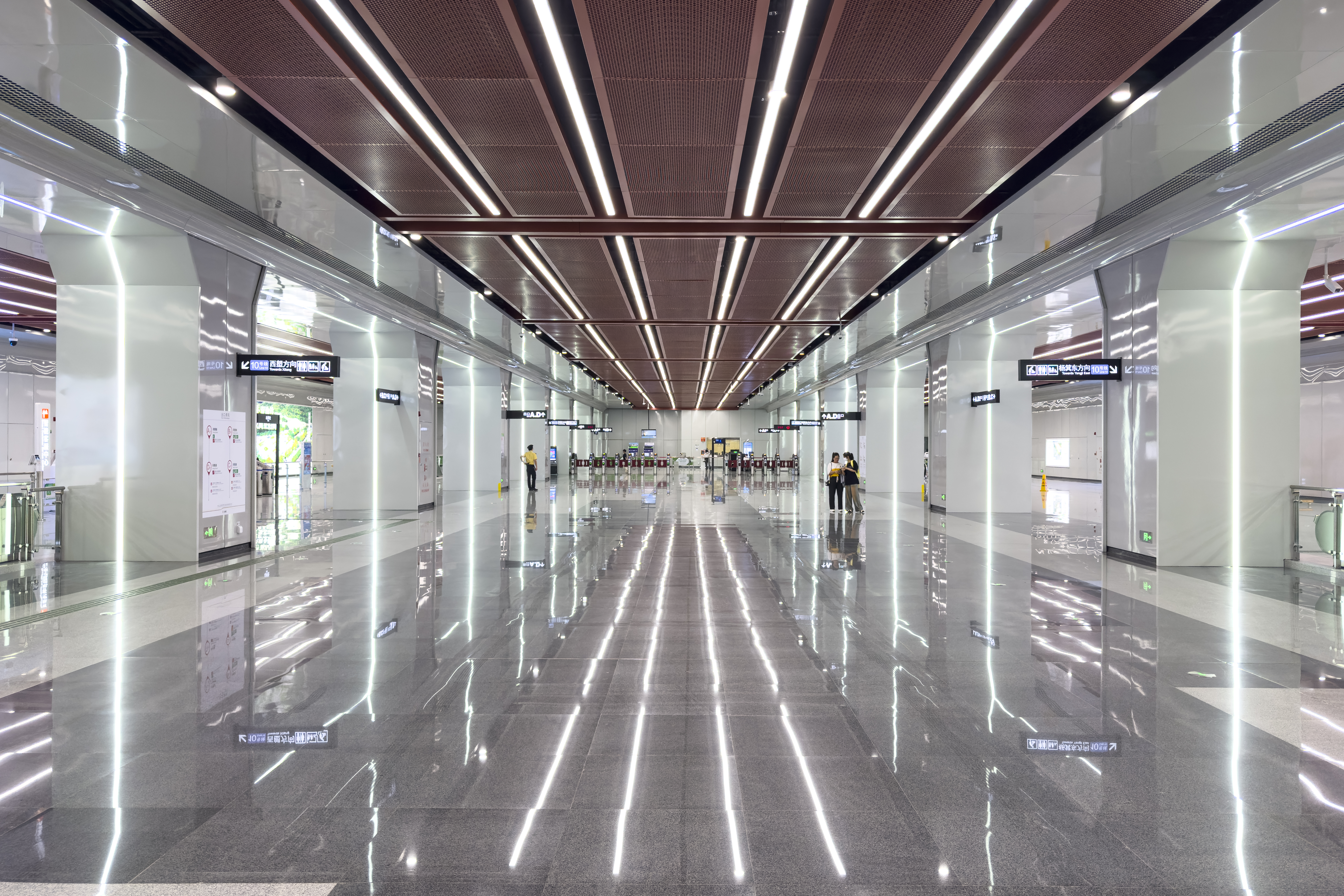
Concourse

=== Platform ===
The station has two island platforms located under a planned road, of which the outer side is used for the Line 10 mainline, and the inner side will be used for a planned branch line of Line 10. At present, the platform reserved for the Line 10 branch line on the inner side has been closed by a decorative panel wall and will not be used until the Line 10 branch line is completed. Therefore, in the eyes of passengers, the station is only equipped with a pair of side platforms. Toilets and a nursery room are located at the end of both platforms towards Dongsha.

=== Entrances/exits ===
The station has 4 points of entry/exit. Exit C is equipped with an elevator.

- A: Hejing Road
- B: Hejing Road
- C: Hejing Road
- D: Hejing Road
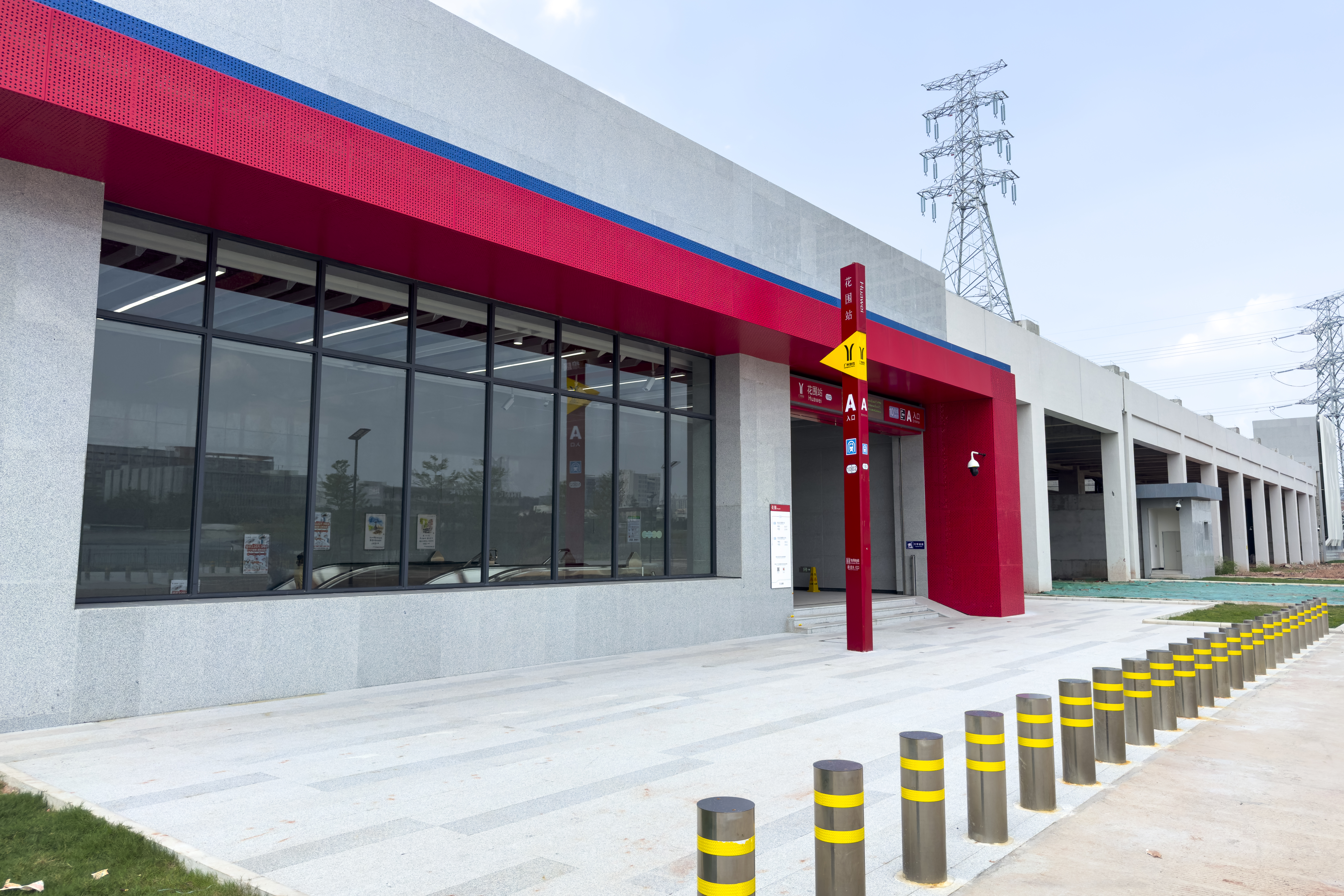
Entrance A

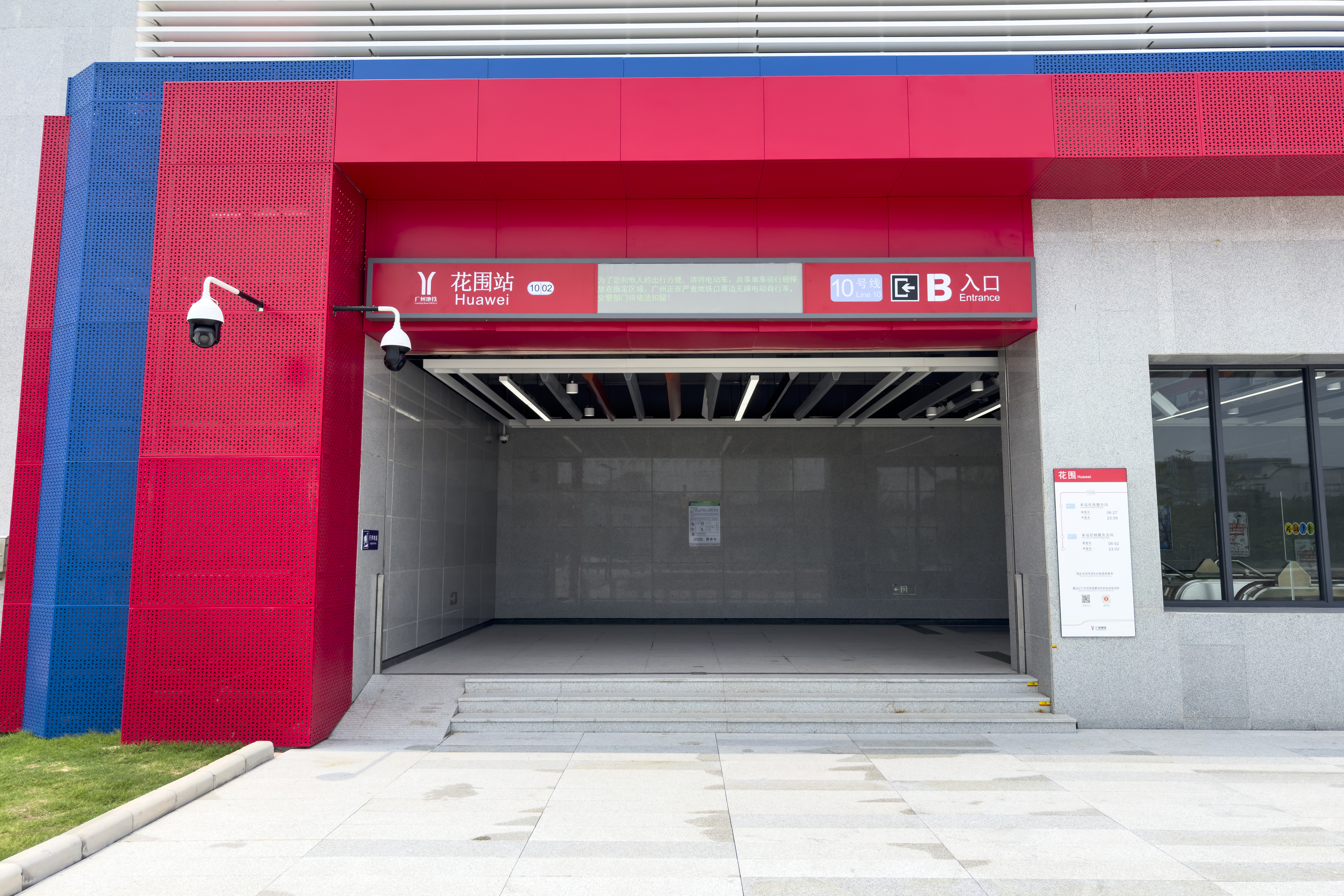
Entrance B

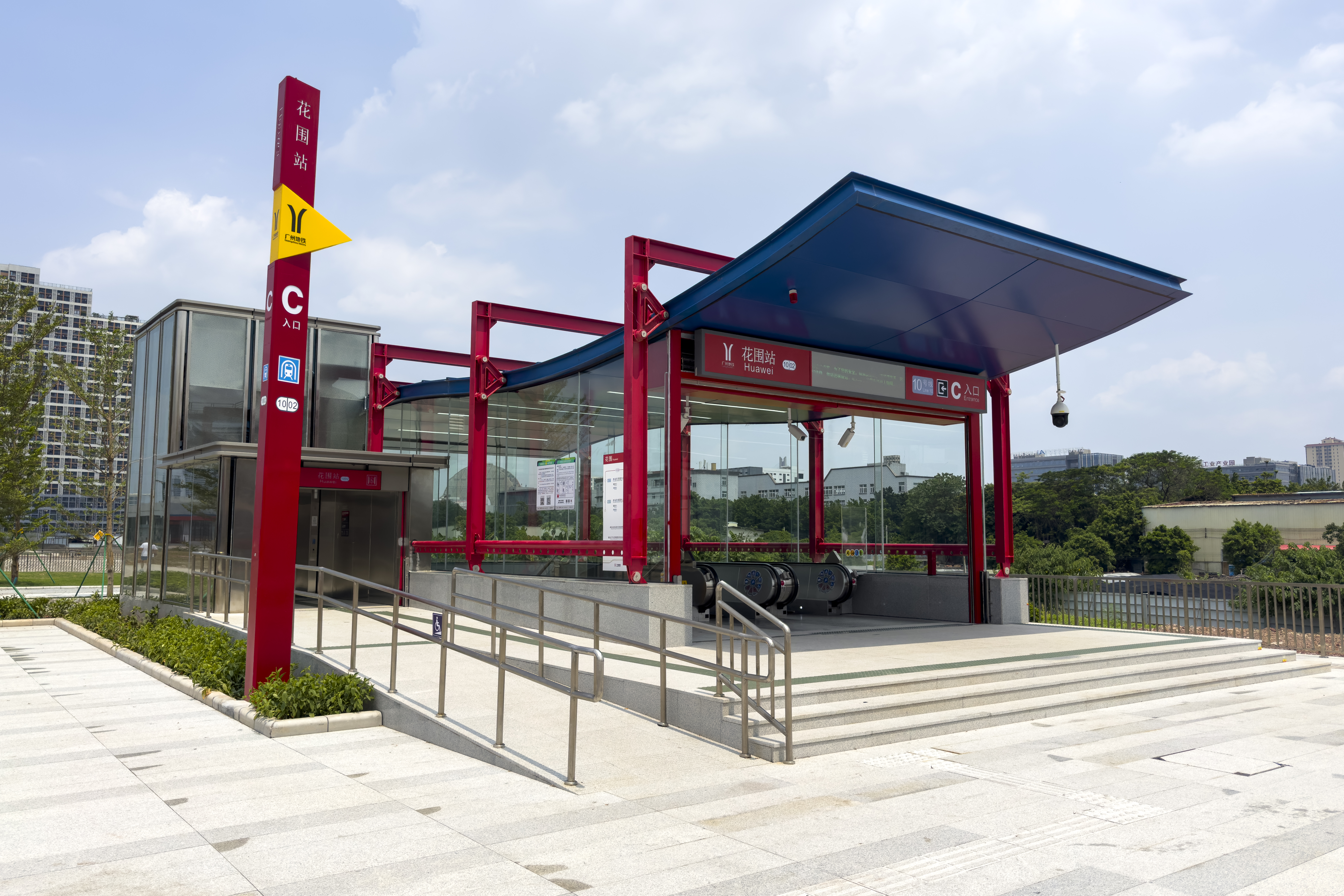
Entrance C

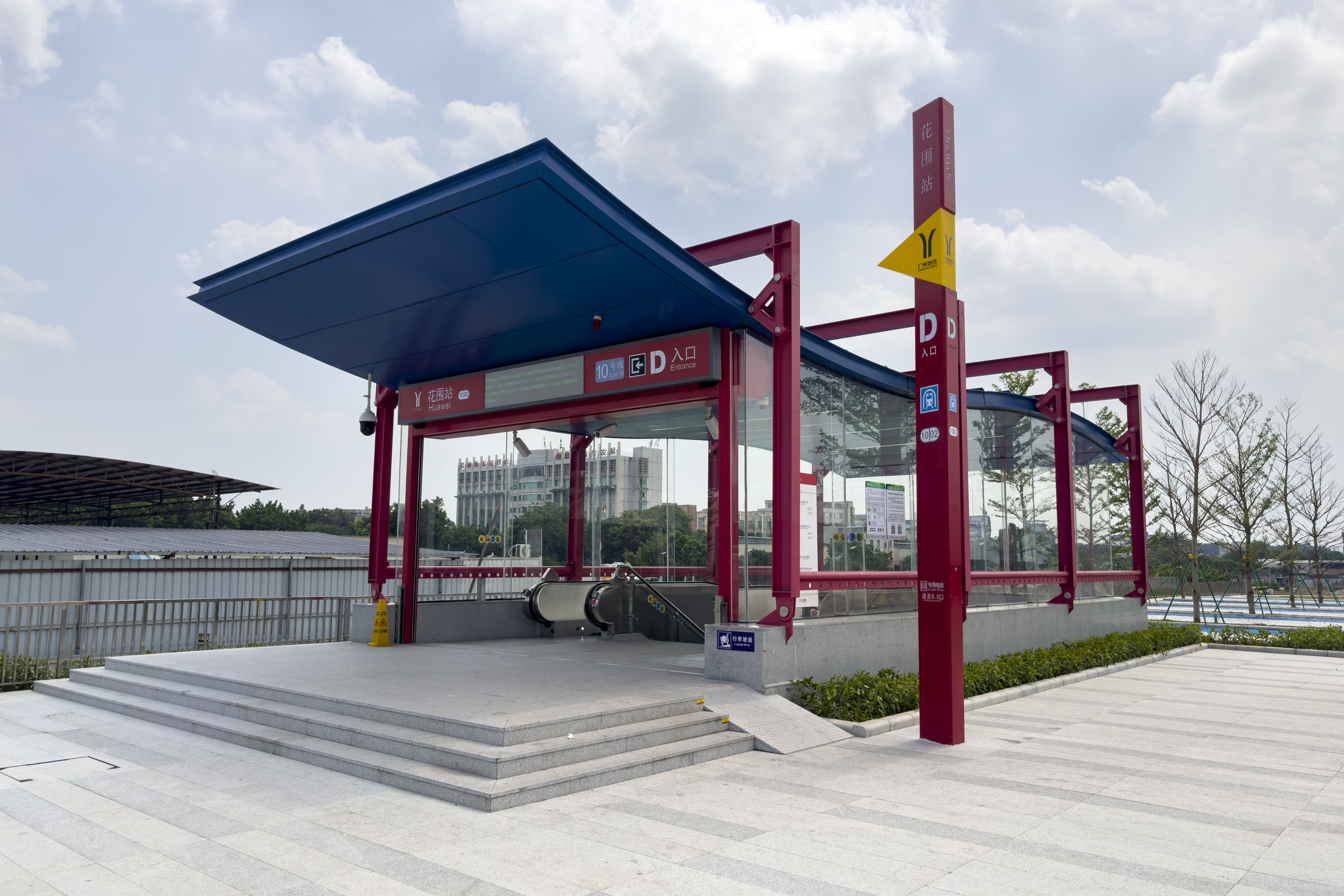
Entrance D

== History ==
Construction of the first phase of the enclosure structure was completed in August 2020, and the second phase completed in June 2021. The roof slab was sealed in February 2022. On 17 January 2025, the station completed the "three rights" transfer.

During planning and construction, the station was called Guanggang New Town station according to the Guanggang New Town area in the north of the station. In April 2025, the Guangzhou Municipal Transportation Bureau announced the preliminary station names for Line 10, and since "Guanggang New Town" is not a standard place name, the authorities renamed the station to Huawei station after the original Huawei Village where the station is located.

On 29 June 2025, the Line 10 main line platforms opened.

== Future development ==
=== Foshan Line 11 ===
The planned Foshan Metro Line 11 will have a station here. The two lines create an "L" shaped node transfer, and Guangzhou Line 10 has built reserved transfer nodes at the time of construction.

=== Guangzhou Line 10 branch line ===
The planned branch line of Line 10 will depart from this station into Foshan. The branch platforms have been completed simultaneously with the construction of the station and will be opened after the opening of the branch line.
