= Chigang station =

Guangzhou Metro Line 8 and Line 12 station

Chigang 赤岗
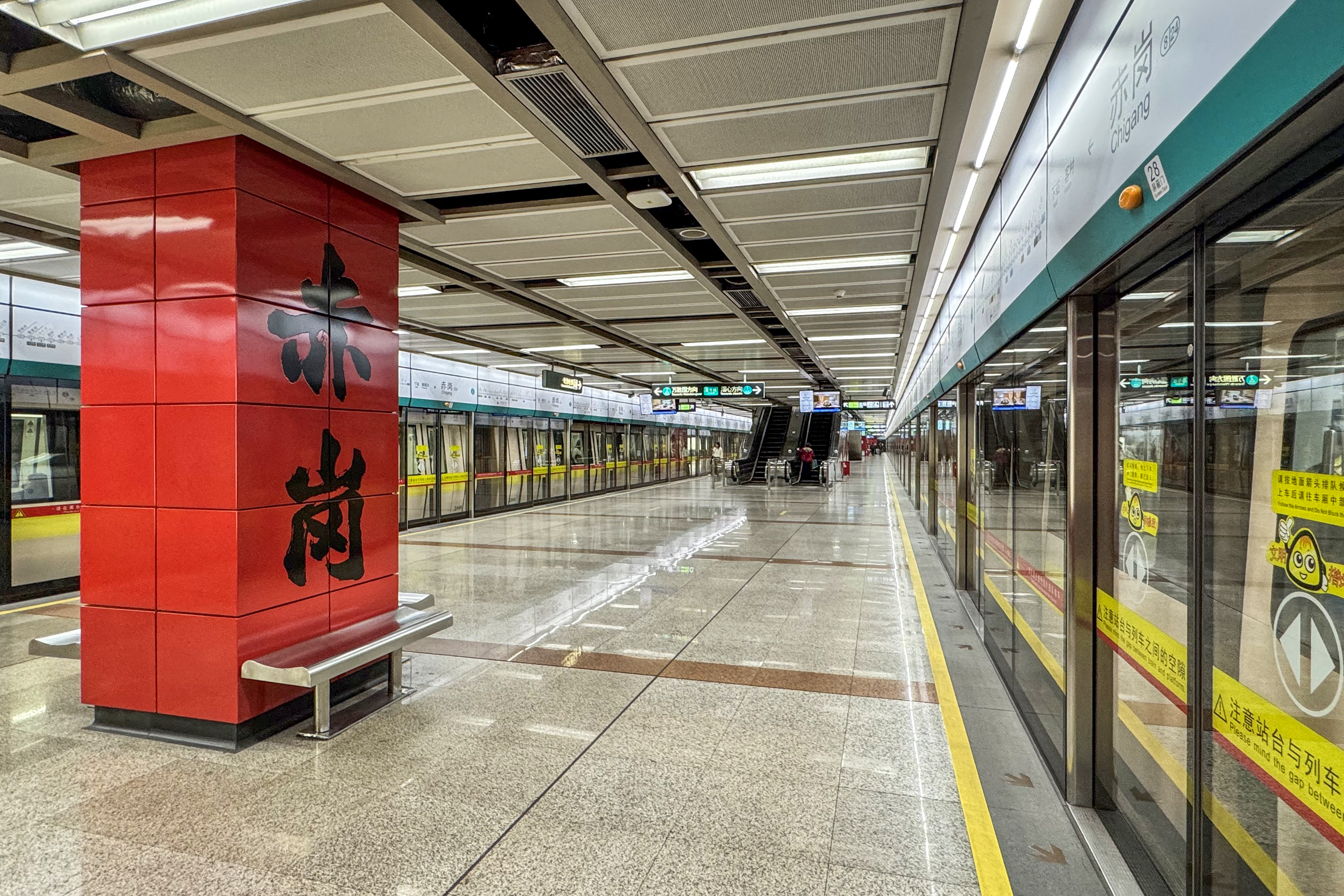
- Line 8 platform

Chinese name
- Simplified Chinese: 赤岗站
- Traditional Chinese: 赤崗站
- Literal meaning: Red Stone Hill station
Transcriptions
Standard Mandarin
- Hanyu Pinyin: Chìgǎng Zhàn
Yue: Cantonese
- Yale Romanization: Cěkgōng Jaahm
- Jyutping: cek^{3}gong^{1} zaam^{6}
- Hong Kong Romanization: Chek Kong station

General information
- Location: Northeast side of the intersection of Xingang Middle Road (新港中路) and Jianghai Avenue (江海大道); Chigang Subdistrict, Haizhu District, Guangzhou, Guangdong; China
- Coordinates: 23°5′57.31″N 113°19′45.19″E
- Operator: Guangzhou Metro Co. Ltd.
- Lines: Line 8; Line 12
- Platforms: 4 (2 island platforms)
- Tracks: 4

Construction
- Structure type: Underground
- Accessible: Yes

Other information
- Station code: 824 1219

History
- Opened: Line 8: 28 June 2003 (23 years ago) (as part of Line 2); Line 12: 13 February 2026 (6 months ago)

Services
Preceding station	Guangzhou Metro	Following station
Kecun towards Jiaoxin	Line 8	Modiesha towards Wanshengwei
Chigang Pagoda towards Ersha Island	Line 12 East section	Chisha North towards Higher Education Mega Center South
Location

Chigang Station (simplified Chinese: 赤岗站; traditional Chinese: 赤崗站; Jyutping: cek^{3} gong^{1} zaam^{6}; Cantonese Yale: Cěkgōng Jaahm) is an interchange station between Line 8 and Line 12 of the Guangzhou Metro. The Line 8 station started operations on 28 June 2003. It is located to the northeast of the junction of Xingang Middle Road (新港中路) and Jiangnan Avenue (江海大道) in the Haizhu District. It became an interchange station with Line 12 on 13 February 2026 when it started operations at this station.

Before the extension to both lines 2 and 8 opened in September 2010, this station ran as part of Line 2 as a single line from Wanshengwei to Sanyuanli.

== Station layout ==
Line 8

The Line 8 station has two levels, the ground level is the exit, and it is surrounded by Xingang Middle Road, Guangdong Second People's Hospital and the nearby commercial complex, the first basement level is the concourse, and the second basement level is the platform.

G	Street level	Exits C1, C2
L1; Concourse	8 Concourse	Customer Service, Ticket Machines, Shops, Security Facilities, transfer to 12
L2; Platforms	Platform 1	8 towards Jiaoxin (Kecun)
L2; Platforms	Island platform, doors will open on the left
L2; Platforms	Platform 2	8 towards Wanshengwei (Modiesha)

Line 12

The Line 12 station has four levels, with the deepest point being 39.8m, making it the deepest station on Line 12. The ground level is the exit, the first basement level is the concourse and transfer concourse and passageways with Line 8, the second and third floors are equipment floors, and the fourth basement level is the platform. This section of the station adopts the same white and light green glass curtain wall decoration as the standard stations on Line 12.

L1	Transfer concourse	Paid-area transfer to Line 8
L1	Line 12 Concourse	Ticket Vending Machines, Customer Service Center, Security Facilities
L1	Transfer passage	Toilets, Nursery, Police Station, Security Facilities, Non-paid area transfer to Line 8
L2	Mezzanine	Station Equipment
L3	Mezzanine	Station Equipment
L4; Platforms	Platform 4	12 towards Ersha Island (Chigang Pagoda)
L4; Platforms	Island platform, doors will open on the left
L4; Platforms	Platform 3	12 towards Higher Education Mega Center South (Chisha North)

=== Concourse ===
Both the Line 8 and Line 12 concourses are located on the first basement level. The paid areas of the two concourses are connected by a transfer concourse, while the unpaid areas are connected by a connecting passageway on the east side of the two station buildings. The concourse has a column-free design, making it more spacious. There are escalators and stairs in the fare-paid areas for passengers to reach the platforms. The elevator connecting the Line 8 platform and the concourse requires the assistance of the station staff because the elevator door on the side of the concourse is located in the non-paid area on the west side.

In addition, both the Line 8 and Line 12 stations have duck neck shops, as well as automatic vending machines, smart lockers and other facilities.

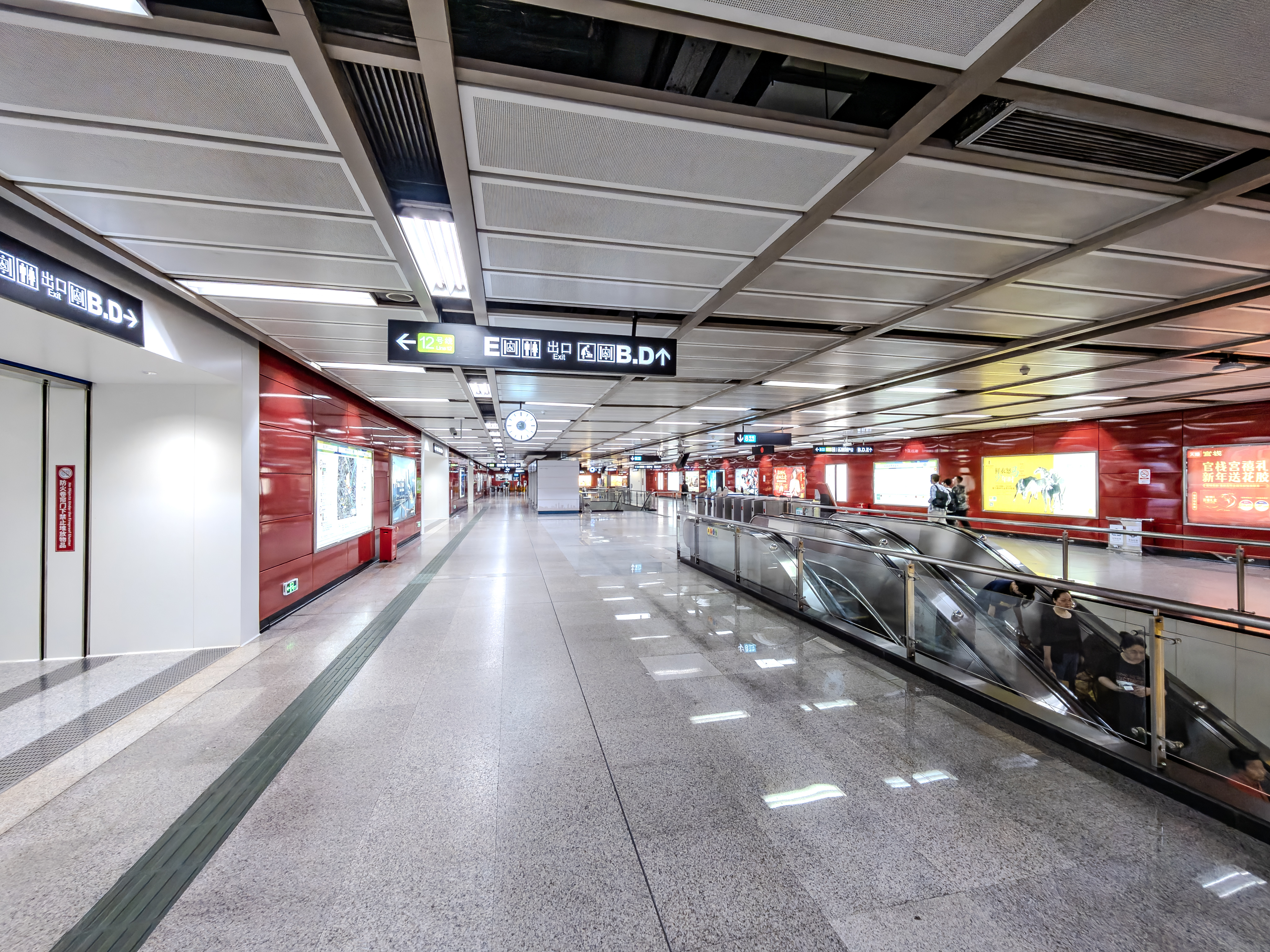
Line 8 concourse

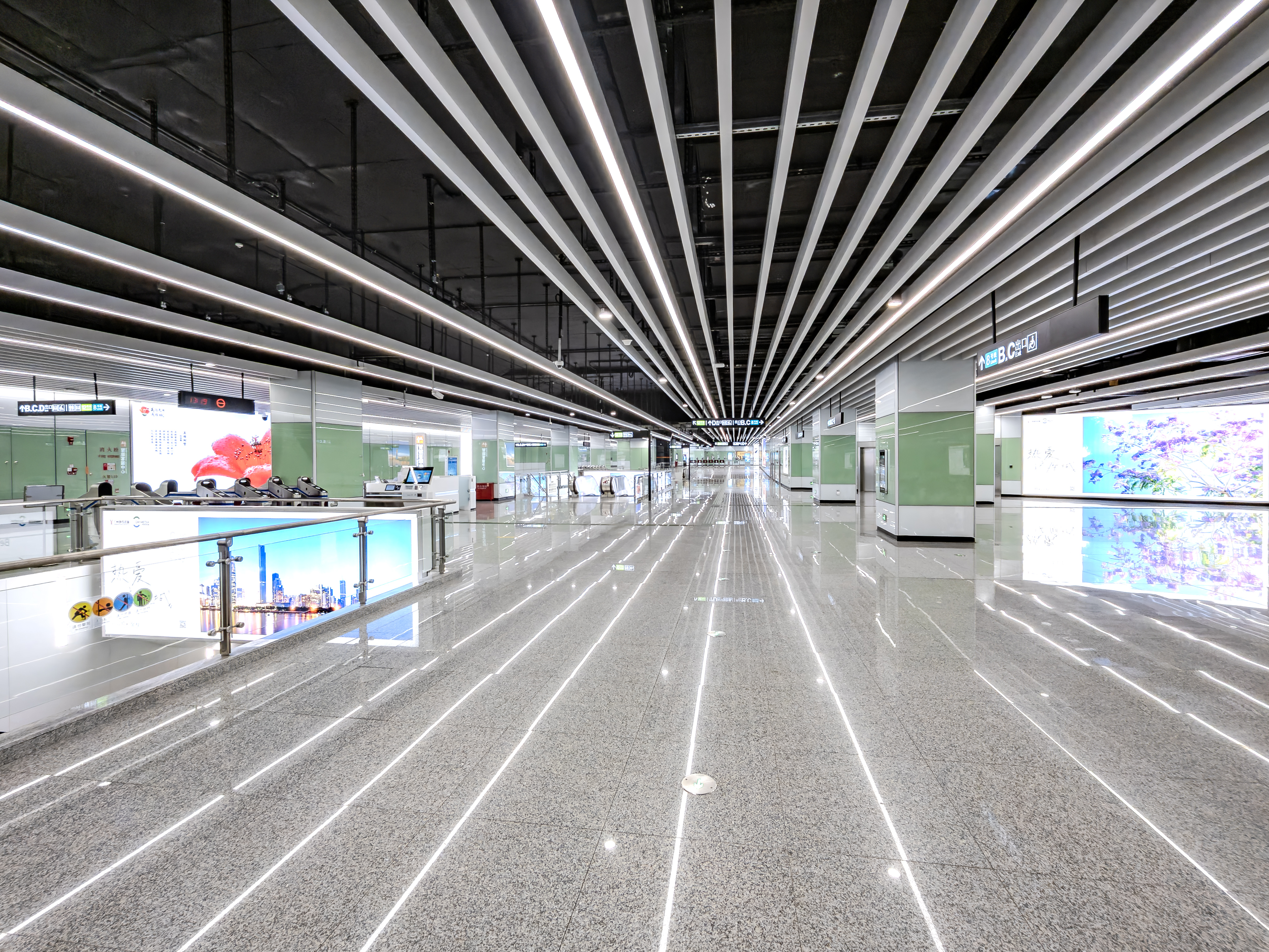
Line 12 concourse

Transfer passage

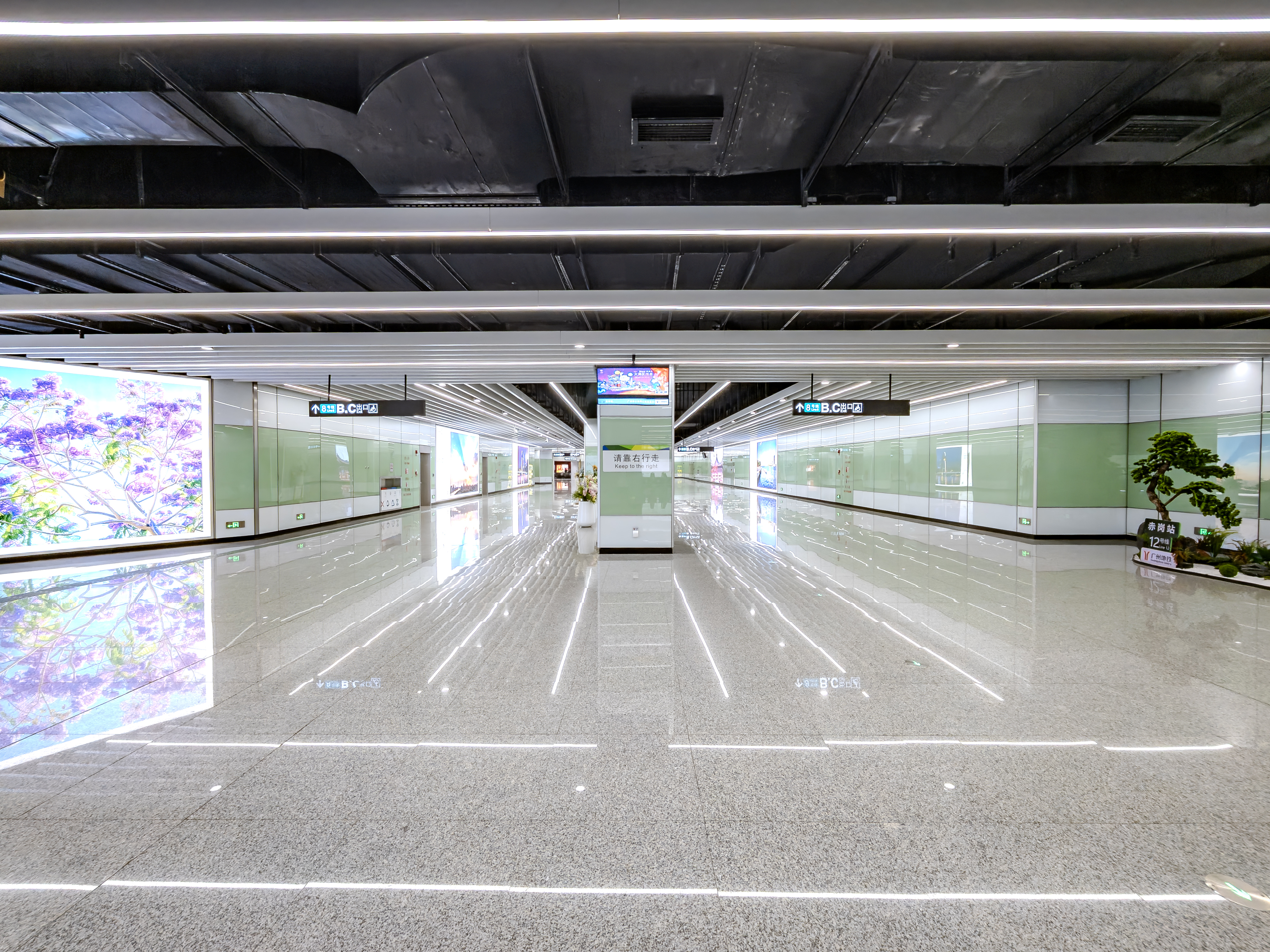
Transfer interface

Non-paid area transfer passage

The concourse connecting passage has toilets and a nursery near the Line 8 concourse

=== Platform ===
Both Line 8 and Line 12 have an underground island platform each. The Line 8 platform is located under Xingang Middle Road. The Line 12 platform is located below the approach bridge of Liede Bridge, underground on the west side of Huangpu Canal. Line 8 is on the upper level, and Line 12 is on the lower level.

In addition, there is a storage line at the east end of the Line 8 station. When there is a fault on Line 8 east of this station, trains bound for Wanshengwei will turn back through this storage line and use this station as the temporary terminus.

The calligraphy of the station name of this site was written by Zhang Biaozhi, then vice chairman of the Guangzhou Calligraphers Association.

Line 8 platform

Platform 3 (Line 12 towards HEMC South)

Platform 4 (Line 12 towards Xunfenggang)

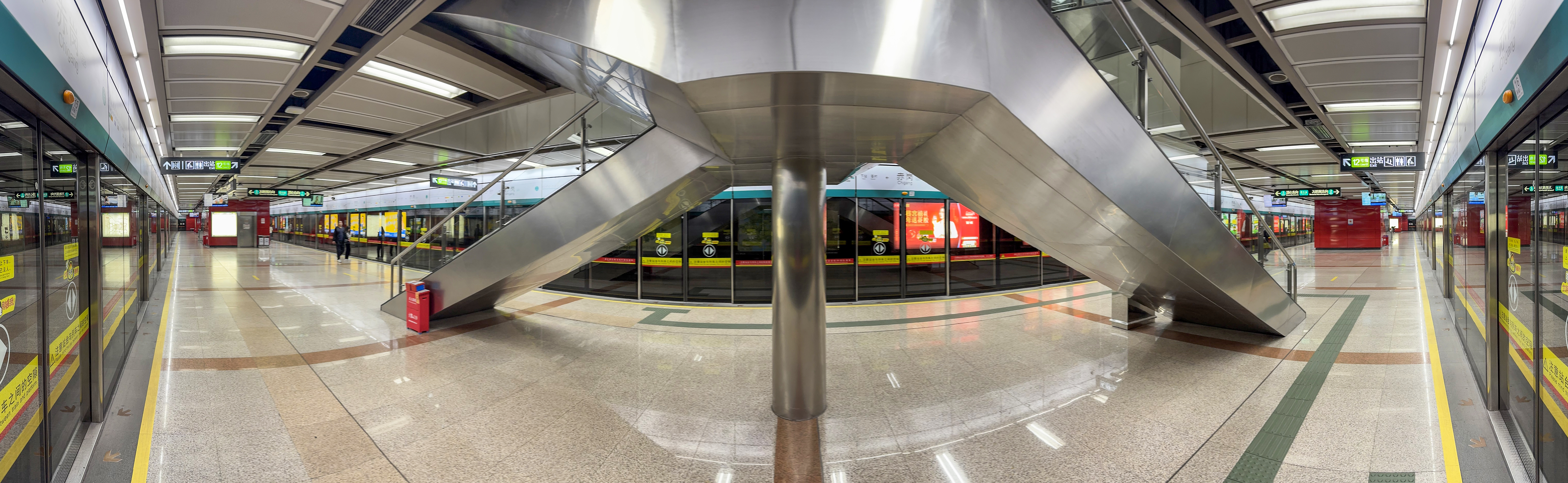
Line 8 platform panorama

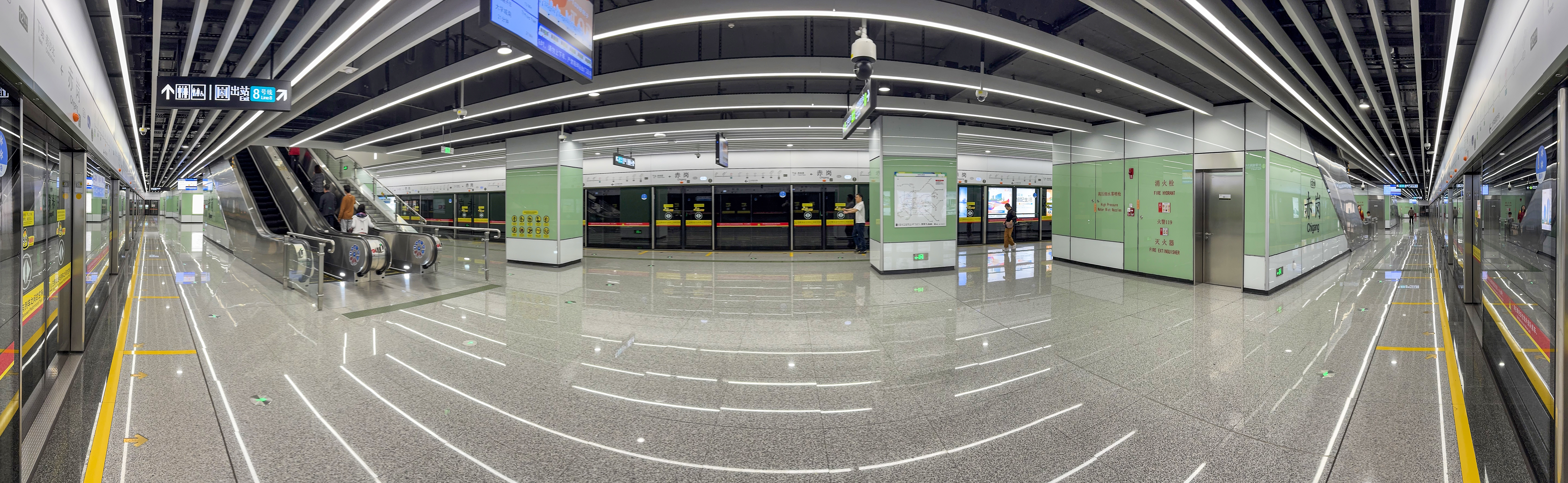
Line 12 platform panorama

=== Entrances/exits ===
The station has 5 points of entry/exit. When the station was initially opened, Exits C1, C2 and D2 were set up. Due to the construction of Line 12 station, Exit D2 was closed since 10 October 2021. When the Line 12 station opened, Exits B, D and E, were added. Exit C1 is equipped with a stairlift, and Exit D is equipped with an elevator.

- B: Xingang Middle Road
- C1: Xingang Middle Road, Guangdong Provincial Second People's Hospital, Southern Medical University Hospital of Integrated Traditional Chinese and Western Medicine
- C2: Xingang Middle Road
- D: Xingang Middle Road
- E: Jianghai Avenue
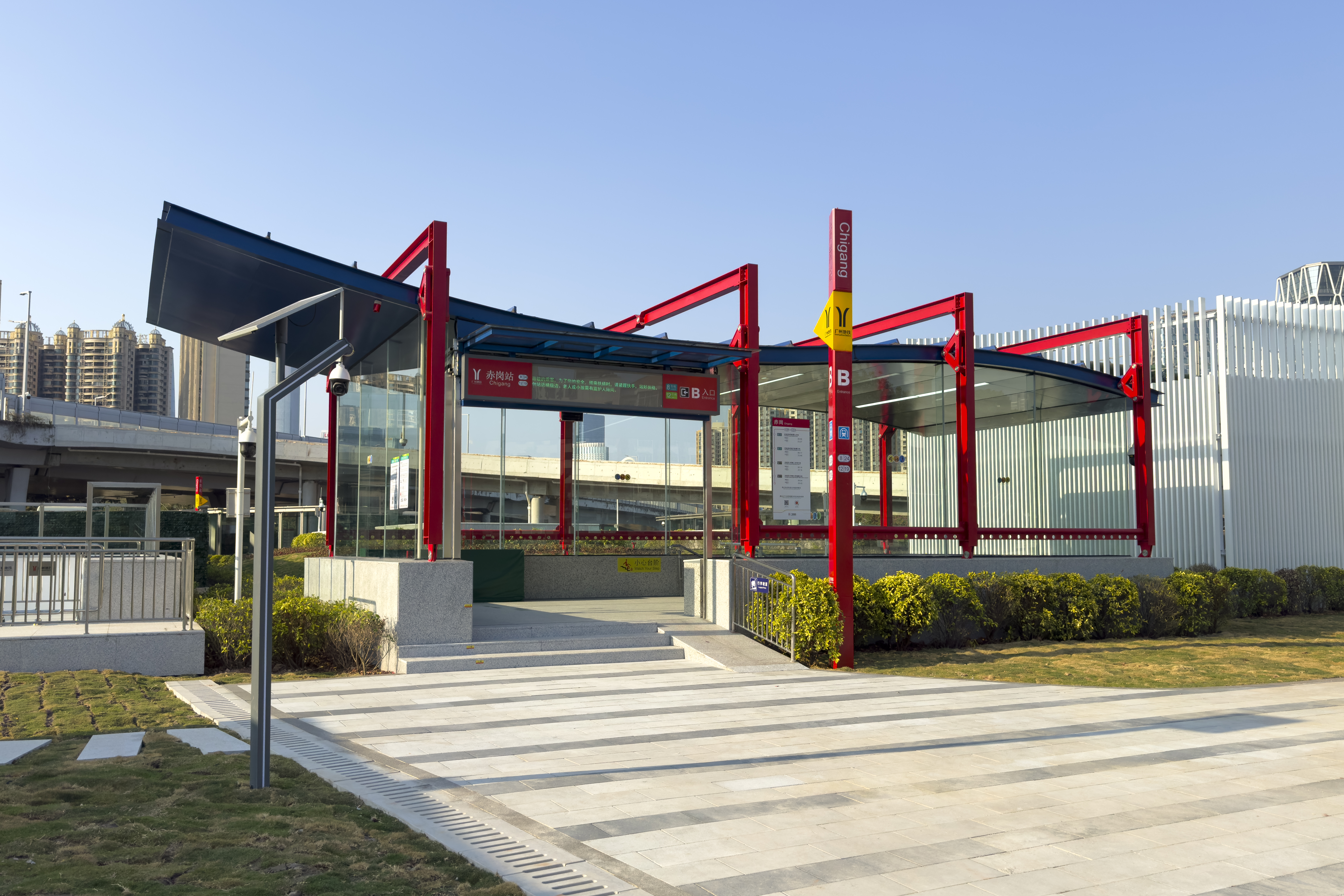
Entrance B

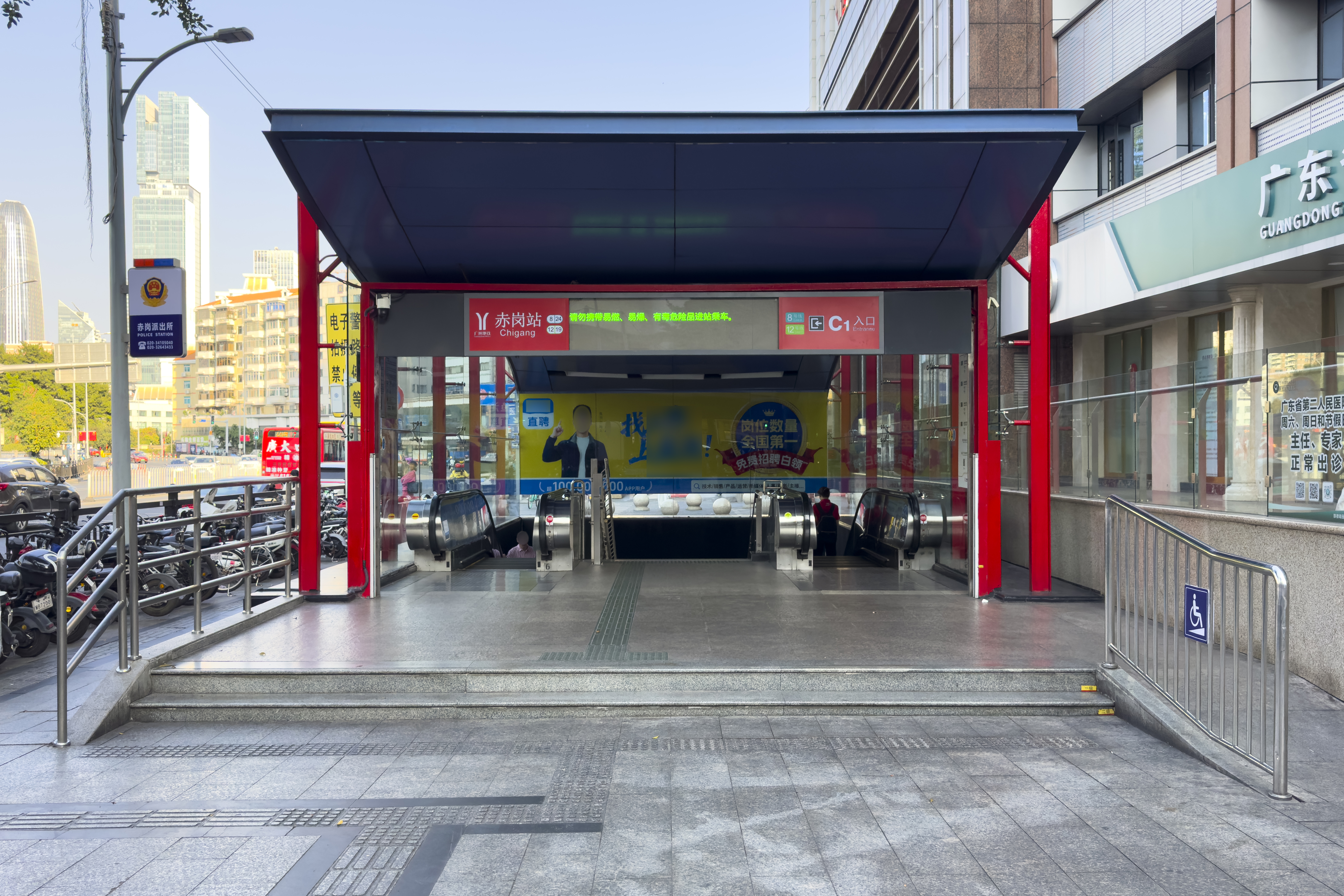
Entrance C1

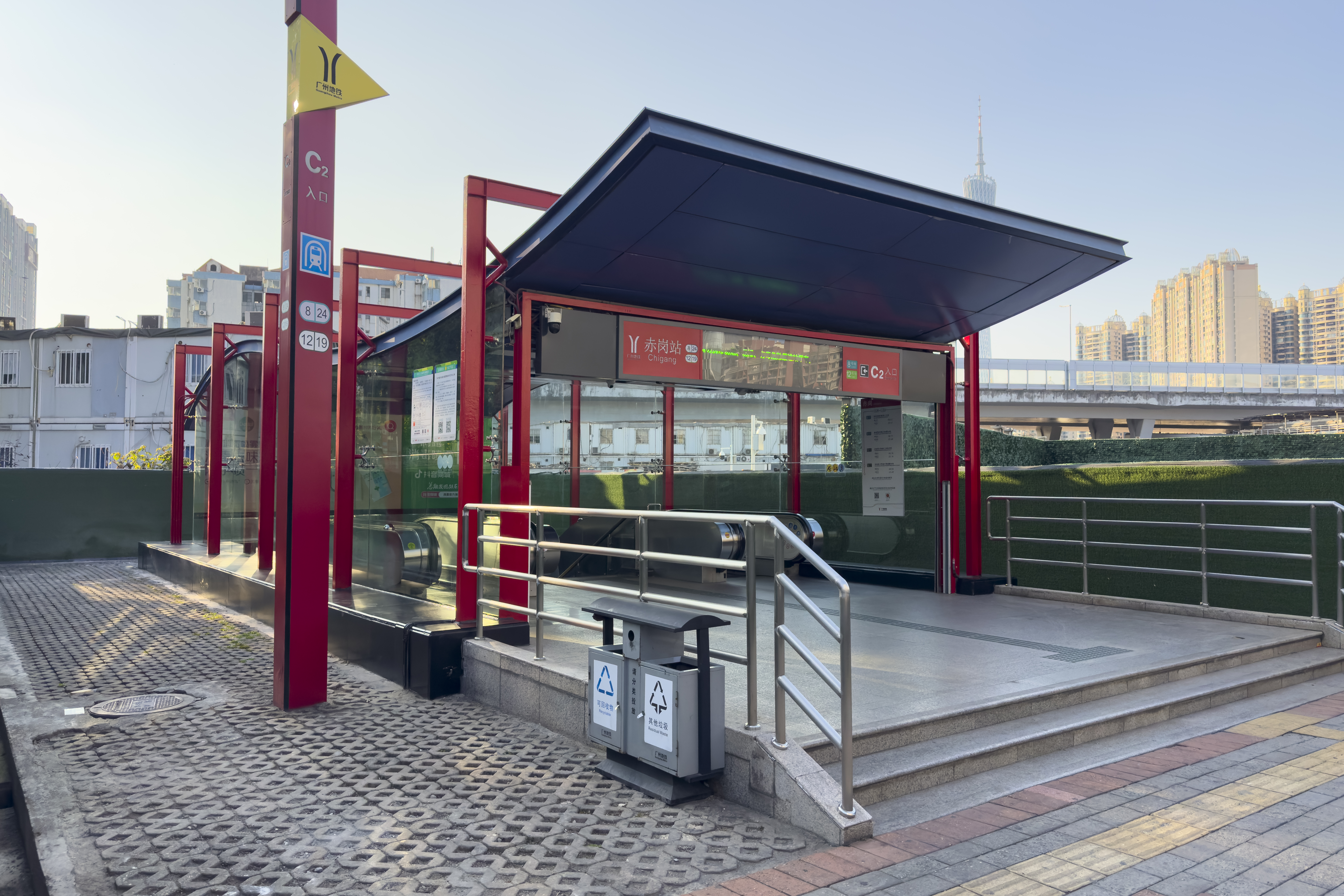
Entrance C2

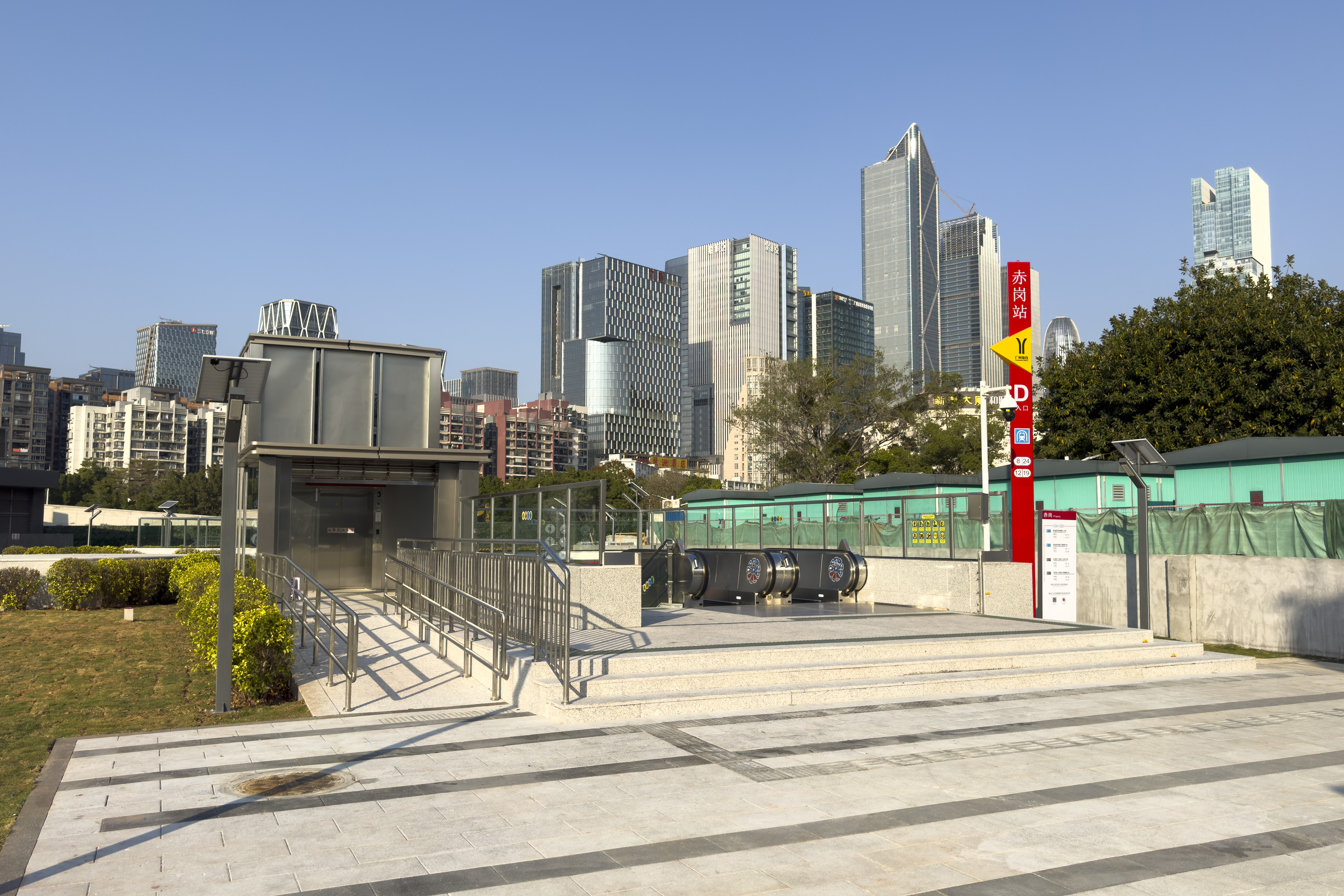
Entrance D

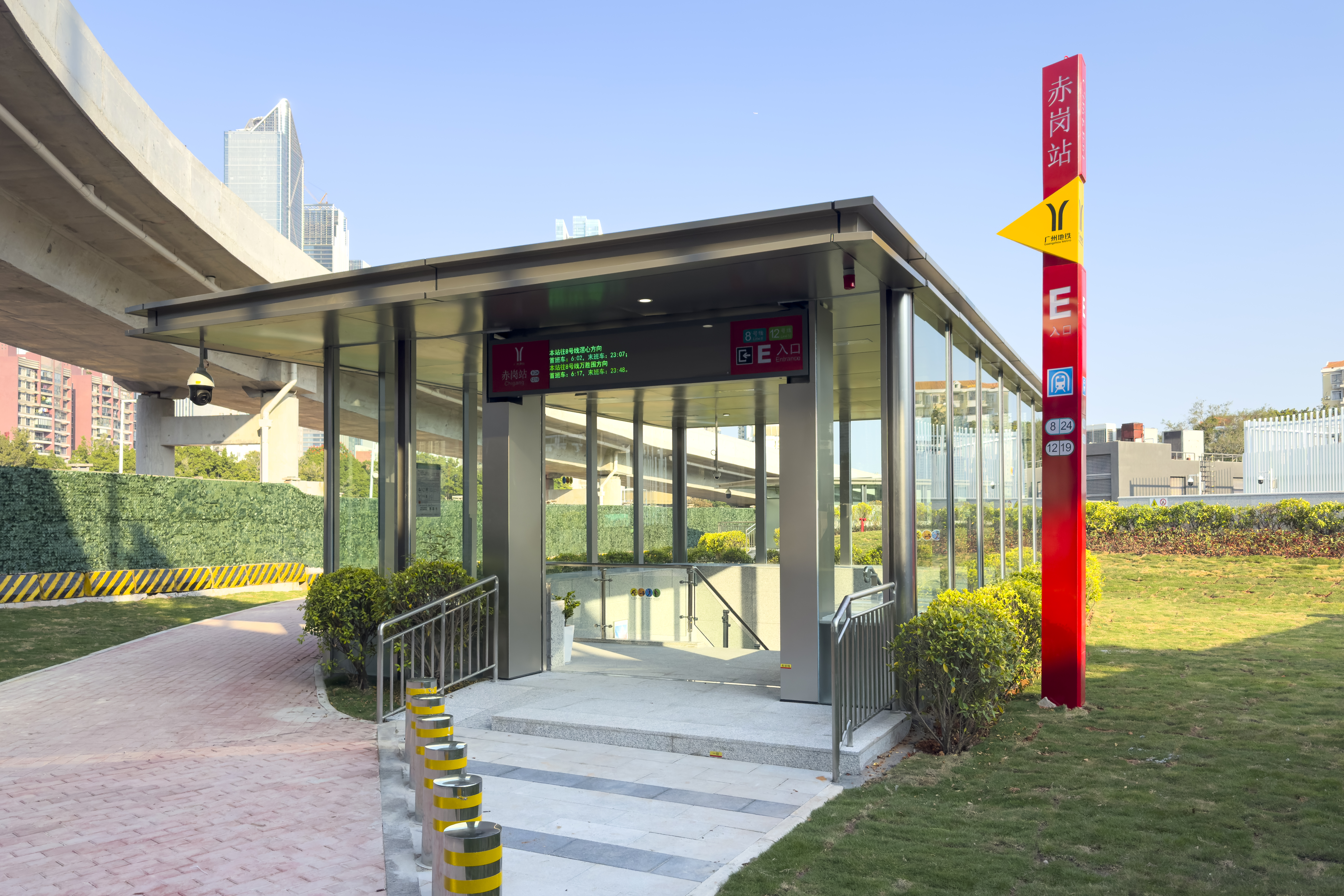
Entrance E

== History ==
=== Line 2 (now Line 8) ===
In the 1988 subway network plan, this station appeared as the terminal station of Line 2 in Haizhu District. Later, in 1997, in Plan A, this station became an intermediate station of Line 5 (now Line 8), which was dismantled from Line 2, and also interchanged with other lines. In later plans, this station was designated as an intermediate station on Line 8 and was no longer an interchange station. Subsequently, this station became one of the stations of the first phase of the old Line 2, which was built first, and the method of pre-emptive long-term split was adopted. Construction of the first phase of Line 2 officially started on 10 October 1999.

The storage line on the east side of the station was originally not planned. Since Kecun station to the west of this station was suddenly designated as a future interchange station with Line 3, the planned intermediate terminus needed to be moved east from Lujiang to cover Kecun Station. However, Kecun Station did not add a storage line during construction, so it was changed to this station as the intermediate terminus. At the same time, a storage line was added to the east of the station to provide a small intersection turnback condition.

On 28 June 2003, the station was opened with the first phase of Line 2 from Xiaogang to Pazhou. From 22 to 24 September 2010, the station was suspended along with the old Line 2 and the line was dismantled. In the early morning of 25 September, the service of this site was restarted with the new Line 8.

=== Lines 12 and 19 ===
In the latest plan in 2014, Line 12 was changed to have a transfer at this station and was implemented with the launch of Line 12 in the first quarter of 2017. According to the relevant information of the 2019 Line 12 supervision bidding, Line 19 changed the planned alignment and added a planned transfer at this station.

The Line 12 station site began to be enclosed on 14 March 2020. Main structure construction began in April 2022, and the station was topped out in October 2024. Construction on the connection to the Line 8 station concourse began in October 2025. Due to the lag in the construction progress, the station could not be opened with the initial section of Line 12, but the station platform has completed civil works and decorations, and has been equipped with screen doors, escalators and elevators, as well as the necessary equipment. However, this station, like Sun Yat-sen University South Gate of Line 10, does not have a covered-up screen door, and passengers can see the platform when their train passes the station.

On 31 December 2025, the Line 12 station completed the "three rights" transfer, and operational testing began immediately. On 10 February 2026, the station passed the pre-opening safety assessment and officially opened on 13 February with the first train.

=== Operation ===
During COVID-19 pandemic control rules at the end of 2022, due to the impact of prevention and control measures, station service was suspended from 09:00 on 5 November 2022 to the afternoon of 30 November 2022. During that time, it served candidates for college entrance examinations and other examinations, and normal services were still provided until 09:00 on the 5th and 6th.

== Future development ==
According to the latest plan, Line 19 will set up a station located east of Liede Bridge, allowing transfers to the existing Lines 8 and 12. Line 19 is a long-term line, and a transfer node was reserved on the sixth underground floor during construction of Line 12.
