= Haizhu, Guangzhou =

Haizhu 海珠区 Honam
- District
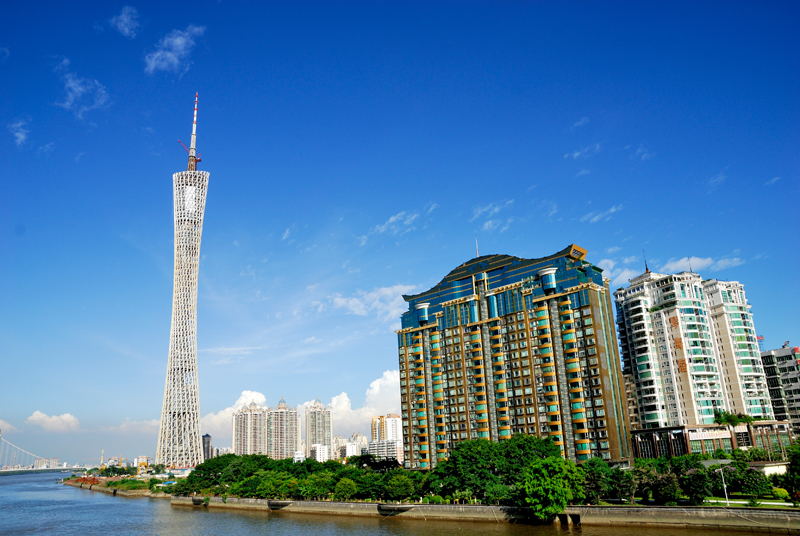
- Skyline of Chigang Subdistrict with the Canton Tower visible

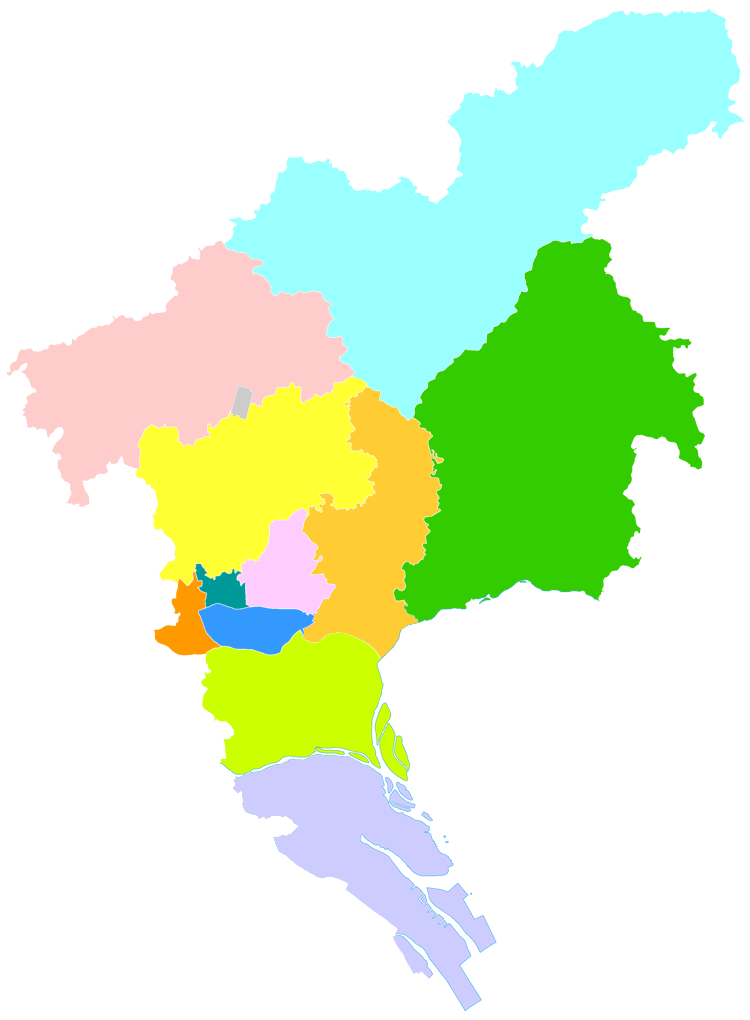
- Haizhu in Guangzhou
- Interactive map of Haizhu
- Coordinates: 23.092681°N 113.354874°E
- Country: People's Republic of China
- Province: Guangdong
- Sub-provincial city: Guangzhou

Area
  - Total: 90.4 km^{2} (34.9 sq mi)

Population (2020)
  - Total: 1,819,037
  - Density: 20,100/km^{2} (52,100/sq mi)
- Time zone: UTC+8 (China Standard)
- Postal code: 510220
- Area code: 020
- Website: www.haizhu.gov.cn

Haizhu, Guangzhou
- Simplified Chinese: 海珠区
- Traditional Chinese: 海珠區
- Jyutping: Hoi2zyu1 Keoi1
- Hanyu Pinyin: Hǎizhū Qū
- Literal meaning: Sea Pearl District
Transcriptions
Standard Mandarin
- Hanyu Pinyin: Hǎizhū Qū
Yue: Cantonese
- Yale Romanization: Hóijyū Kēui
- Jyutping: Hoi2zyu1 Keoi1
- Canton Romanization: Hoi2-ju1 Kêu1
- IPA: [hɔj˧˥.tsy˥]

Henan
- Chinese: 河南
- Jyutping: Ho4 naam4
- Hanyu Pinyin: Hénán
- Literal meaning: South of the River
Transcriptions
Standard Mandarin
- Hanyu Pinyin: Hénán
Yue: Cantonese
- Yale Romanization: Hòh nàahm
- Jyutping: Ho4 naam4
- Canton Romanization: Ho4-nam4

Haizhu District is one of 11 urban districts of the prefecture-level city of Guangzhou, the capital of Guangdong Province, China.

== Geography ==
Haizhu District is located in the southern part of Guangzhou city. After the adjustment of Guangzhou's administrative regional planning in 2005, the northern part of Haizhu District is adjacent to Liwan District, Yuexiu District and Tianhe District across the Pearl River, and the eastern, western and southern parts are adjacent to Huangpu District, Liwan District and Panyu District respectively. The main parts of the area are Haizhu Island and Henan Island. In addition, there are Guanzhou Island and Yajisha Island. Haizhu District is located between 113°14' to 113°23' east longitude and 23°3' to 23°16' north latitude, surrounded by the front and rear waterways of the Guangzhou section of the Pearl River. The area includes Haizhu Island, Henan Island, Guanzhou Island in the southeast and Yajisha Island in the south, with a total area of 90.40 square kilometers.

== History ==
Haizhu District originally consisted of Henan or Honam Island ("South of the River"), across the Pearl River from the old city of Guangzhou (then known as "Canton"). Its main community was also known by the same name and surrounded the Hoi Tong Monastery.

According to archaeological discoveries, there were inhabitants settled in the district around three thousand years to four thousand years ago. Western Han dynasty tombs and Eastern han dynasty tombs were often found in the region. From 1856 to 1859, trading companies associated with foreign traders under the Canton System temporarily relocated to the district after the Thirteen Factories site was destroyed in a fire.

Haizhu District was originally governed by Panyu County before ceded to Guangzhou. Haizhu was once the largest district in Guangzhou, its southernmost and its least dense. With the expansion of Guangzhou, it no longer holds any of these titles. Although less built-up than Liwan and Yuexiu Districts, Haizhu now has some of the most expensive real estate in the city. Its riverfront now has some of the tallest and most expensive residential buildings in Guangzhou.

== Administrative divisions ==
Name	Chinese (S)	Hanyu Pinyin	Canton Romanization	Population (2010)	Area (km^{2})
Binjiang Subdistrict	滨江街道	Bīnjiāng Jiēdào	ben1 gong1 gai1 dou6	72,324	16.07
Changgang Subdistrict	昌岗街道	Chānggǎng Jiēdào	cêng1 gong1 gai1 dou6	97,986	1.96
Chigang Subdistrict	赤岗街道	Chìgǎng Jiēdào	cég3 gong1 gai1 dou6	114,978	5.73
Fengyang Subdistrict	凤阳街道	Fèngyáng Jiēdào	fung6 yêng4 gai1 dou6	162,641	9.30
Guanzhou Subdistrict	官洲街道	Guānzhōu Jiēdào	gun1 zeo1 gai1 dou6	57,869	11.20
Haichuang Subdistrict	海幢街道	Hǎichuáng Jiēdào	hoi2 cong4 gai1 dou6	62,884	1.45
Huazhou Subdistrict	华洲街道	Huázhōu Jiēdào	wa4 zeo1 gai1 dou6	49,742	12.2
Jianghai Subdistrict	江海街道	Jiānghǎi Jiēdào	gong1 hoi2 gai1 dou6	115,157	5.30
Jiangnanzhong Subdistrict	江南中街道	Jiāngnánzhōng Jiēdào	gong1 nam4 zung1 gai1 dou6	75,220	2.36
Longfeng Subdistrict	龙凤街道	Lóngfèng Jiēdào	lung4 fung6 gai1 dou6	102,561	2.38
Nanhuaxi Subdistrict	南华西街道	Nánhuáxī Jiēdào	nam4 wa4 sei1 gai1 dou6	37,960	1.10
Nanshitou Subdistrict	南石头街道	Nánshítou Jiēdào	nam4 ség6 teo4 gai1 dou6	123,043	4.80
Nanzhou Subdistrict	南洲街道	Nánzhōu Jiēdào	nam4 zeo1 gai1 dou6	84,726	12.30
Pazhou Subdistrict	琶洲街道	Pázhōu Jiēdào	pa4 zeo1 gai1 dou6	29,851	10.00
Ruibao Subdistrict	瑞宝街道	Ruìbǎo Jiēdào	sêu 6bou2 gai1 dou6	125,399	6.30
Shayuan Subdistrict	沙园街道	Shāyuán Jiēdào	sa1 yun4 gai1 dou6	67,322	1.44
Sushe Subdistrict	素社街道	Sùshè Jiēdào	sou3 se5 gai1 dou6	67,103	1.68
Xingang Subdistrict	新港街道	Xīngǎng Jiēdào	sen1 gong2 gai1 dou6	111,897	3.85

== Economy ==
7 Days Inn has its corporate headquarters in the Creative Industry Zone (Note: 创意园; 創意園; Chuàngyìyuán; cong3 ji3 jyun4) in Haizhu.

The headquarters of Zhujiang Beer is in Haizhu District.

== Education ==
The main campus of Sun Yat-Sen University is located in Haizhu, as well as the Guangzhou Fine Arts Academy. Right across the street from the Sun Yat-Sen University is the South Sea Institute of Oceanology, Chinese Academy of Sciences. The Guangzhou No.6 High School alongside the university is one of the best in the city, containing programs that follow the American curriculum.

== Transportation ==
Guangzhou's Metro Line 8's eastern end is in Haizhu. Metro Line 3 runs from north to south through the District, while Line 5, currently under construction, will also have stations in it. Another metro line, the Guangfo Line, connects Guangzhou and Foshan, a city just west of Guangzhou. It is the first metro line connecting two cities in China.

=== Metro ===
Haizhu is currently serviced by ten metro lines operated by Guangzhou Metro:

- Line 2 – The 2nd Workers' Cultural Palace, Jiangnanxi, Changgang ( 8 ), Jiangtai Road ( 11 ), Dongxiao South ( 10 ), Nanzhou ( Guangfo )
- Line 3 – Canton Tower ( APM ), Kecun ( 8 ), Datang ( 11 ), Lijiao ( Guangfo )
- Line 4 – Wanshengwei ( 8 ), Guanzhou ( 12 )
- Line 8 – Tongfuxi, Fenghuang Xincun, Shayuan ( Guangfo ), Baogang Dadao, Changgang ( 2 ), Xiaogang, Sun Yat-sen University, Lujiang, Kecun ( 3 ), Chigang ( 12 ), Modiesha ( 18 ), Xingangdong, Pazhou ( 11 ), Wanshengwei ( 4 )
- Line 10 – Daganwei, Gongye Avenue South, Dongxiao South ( 2 ), Wufeng ( 11 ), Sun Yat-sen University South Gate, Binjiang East Road
- Line 11 – Diyuan, Yangang ( Guangfo ), Jiangtai Road ( 2 ), Wufeng ( 10 ), Yijing Road, Shangchong, Datang ( 3 ), Longtan ( 18 ), Chisha ( 12 ), Pazhou ( 8 )
- Line 12 – Chigang Pagoda, Chigang ( 8 ), Chisha North, Chisha ( 11 ), Beishan, Guanzhou ( 4 )
- Line 18 – Modiesha ( 8 ), Longtan ( 11 )
- Guangfo line – Shayuan ( 8 ), Yangang ( 11 ), Shixi, Nanzhou ( 2 ), Lijiao ( 3 )
- APM line – Canton Tower ( 3 )

=== Tram ===
- Haizhu Tram – Wanshengwei <-> Canton Tower

== Arts ==
The artists cooperative Park19 has facilities on Haizhu.

== See also ==
- Xinjiao Town, a town under the administration of Haizhu.
- Yingzhou Ecological Park
