= Xinjiao =

Xinjiao (Chinese: 新教; lit. 'New Teaching') may refer to:

- Protestantism in China
- Jahriyya Sufi Order

== Other uses ==
- Xinjiao Town (新滘), Guangdong
