= Baogang Dadao station =

Guangzhou Metro station

Coordinates: 23.08601°N 113.26937°E

Baogang Dadao 宝岗大道
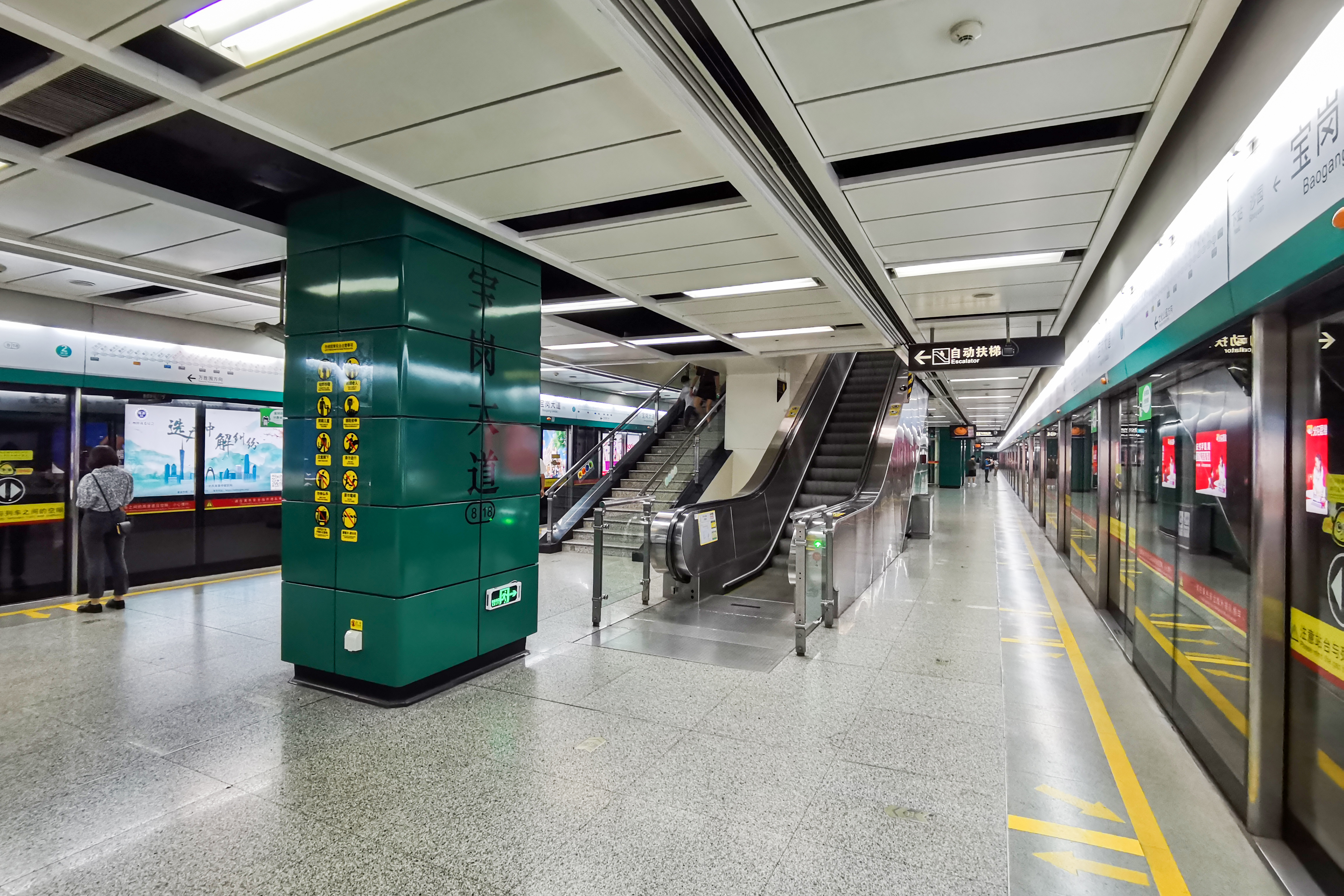

Chinese name
- Simplified Chinese: 宝岗大道站
- Traditional Chinese: 寶崗大道站
Transcriptions
Standard Mandarin
- Hanyu Pinyin: Bǎogǎng Dàdào Zhàn
Yue: Cantonese
- Jyutping: bou^{2}gong^{1} daai^{6}dou^{6} zaam^{6}

General information
- Location: Haizhu District, Guangzhou, Guangdong; China
- Operated by: Guangzhou Metro Co. Ltd.
- Line: Line 8
- Platforms: 2 (1 island platform)

Construction
- Structure type: Underground

Other information
- Station code: 818

History
- Opened: 3 November 2010; 15 years ago

Services
Preceding station	Guangzhou Metro	Following station
Shayuan towards Jiaoxin	Line 8	Changgang towards Wanshengwei
Location

Baogang Dadao Station (Chinese: 宝岗大道站; lit. 'Baogang Avenue station'), known as Changgang Zhonglu Station (昌岗中路站) during planning, is a metro station on Line 8 of the Guangzhou Metro. The underground station is located on Changgang Middle Road in the Haizhu District. The station opened on November 3, 2010 after a delay caused by the cooling tower at Shayuan station.

== Station layout ==
G	-	Exits
L1; Concourse	Lobby	Customer Service, Shops, Vending machines, ATMs
L2; Platforms	Platform 1	8 towards Jiaoxin (Shayuan)
L2; Platforms	Island Platform, doors will open on the left
L2; Platforms	Platform 2	8 towards Wanshengwei (Changgang)

== Exits ==
Exit number	Exit location
Exit A	Changgang Zhonglu
Exit C	Changgang Zhonglu
Exit D	Baogang Dadao
