= Sun Yat-sen University station (Guangzhou Metro) =

Metro station in Guangzhou, China

Coordinates: 23.0918°N 113.2939°E

Sun Yat-sen University 中大
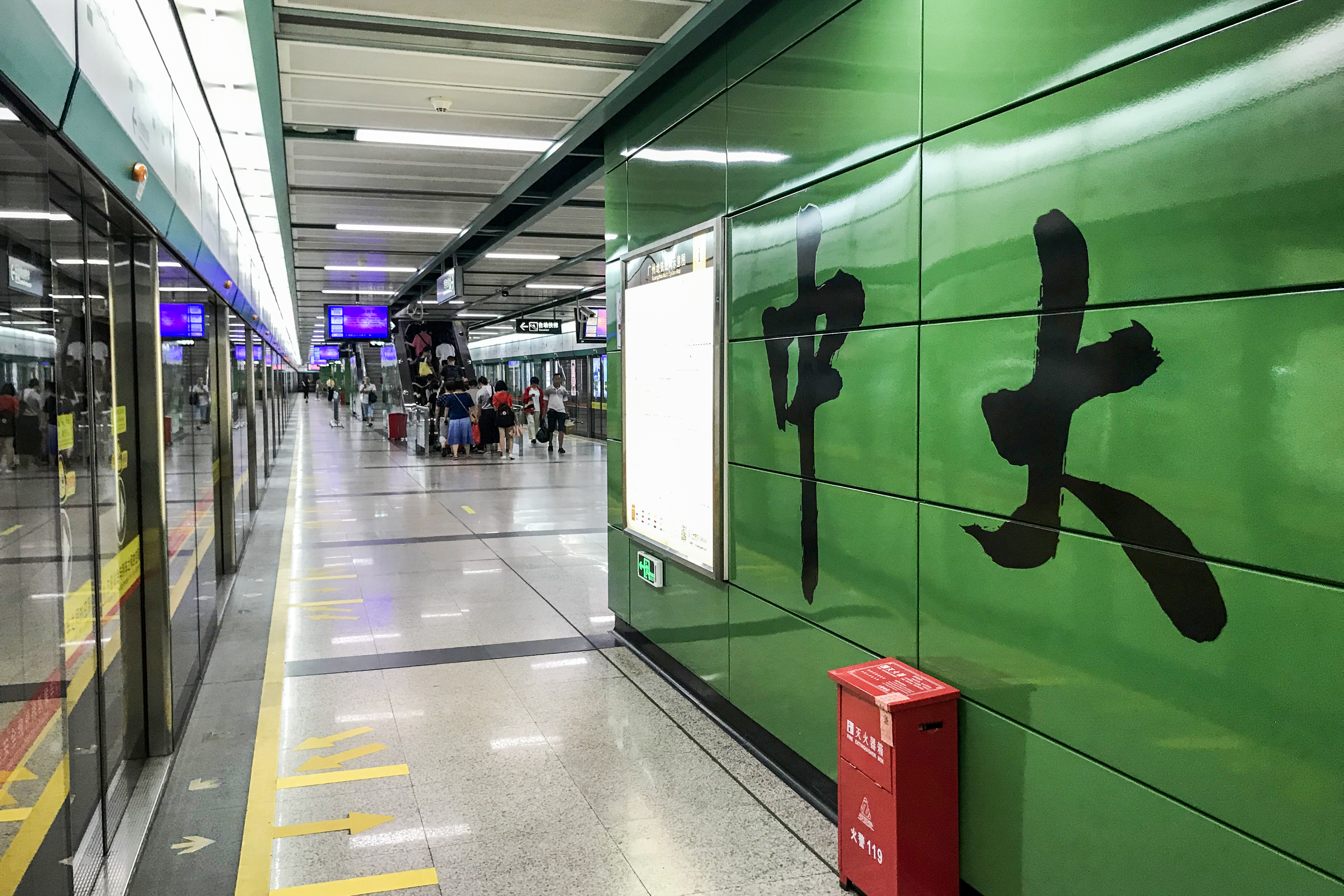

General information
- Location: Haizhu District, Guangzhou, Guangdong; China
- Operated by: Guangzhou Metro Co. Ltd.
- Line: Line 8
- Platforms: 2 (1 island platform)
- Tracks: 2

Construction
- Structure type: Underground
- Accessible: Yes

Other information
- Station code: 821

History
- Opened: 28 June 2003; 22 years ago

Services
Preceding station	Guangzhou Metro	Following station
Xiaogang towards Jiaoxin	Line 8	Lujiang towards Wanshengwei
Location

Sun Yat-sen University Station (Chinese: 中大站; pinyin: Zhōngdà Zhàn; Jyutping: zung^{1}daai^{6} zaam^{6}) is a station on Line 8 of the Guangzhou Metro that started operations on 28 June 2003. It is located under Xingang Road West (新港西路) and Lixin Road (立新路) in the Haizhu District of Guangzhou. Its name is derived from the nearby Sun Yat-sen University.

Before the extension to both lines 2 and 8 opened in September 2010, this station ran as part of Line 2 as a single line from Wanshengwei to Sanyuanli.

The station is near the south campus of Sun Yat-sen University (中山大学), the Zhongda Fabric Market (中大布料市场), and residential areas. Thus, the station primarily serves university students, nearby residents, and wholesale customers heading to the market. The passenger flow is generally high and surges during peak hours.

== Station layout ==
G	-	Exits
L1; Concourse	Lobby	Customer Service, Shops, Vending machines, ATMs
L2; Platforms	Platform 1	8 towards Jiaoxin (Xiaogang)
L2; Platforms	Island Platform, doors will open on the left
L2; Platforms	Platform 2	8 towards Wanshengwei (Lujiang)

== Exits ==
Exit number		Exit location
Exit A		Xingang Xilu
Exit B		Xingang Xilu
Exit C	C1	Xingang Xilu
Exit C	C2	Xingang Xilu
Exit D		Xingang Xilu
