= Kecun station =

Guangzhou Metro interchange station

Coordinates: 23°05′46″N 113°19′13″E

Kecun 客村
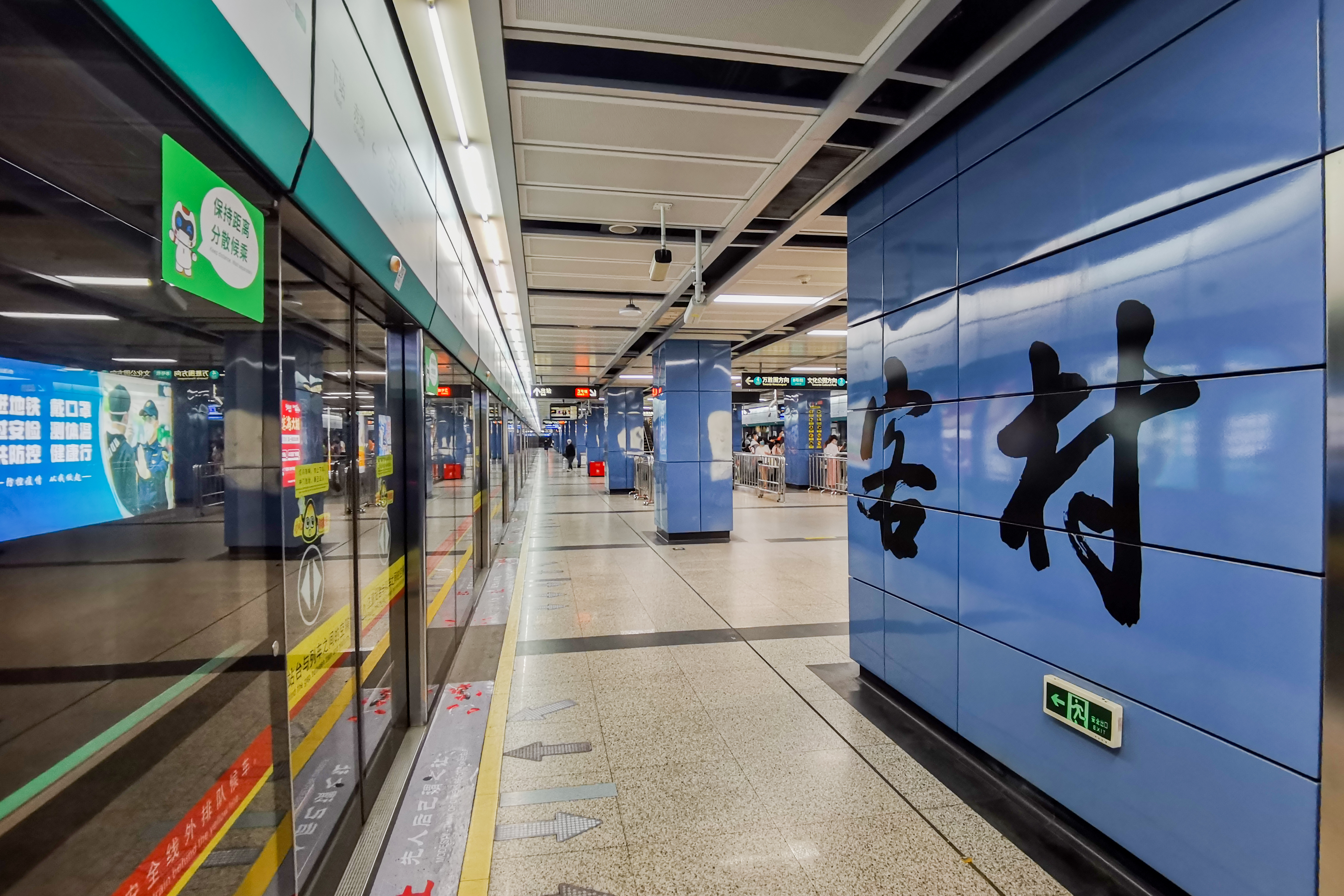
- Line 8 platform

Chinese name
- Chinese: 客村站
Transcriptions
Standard Mandarin
- Hanyu Pinyin: Kècūn Zhàn
Yue: Cantonese
- Yale Romanization: Haakchyūn Jaahm
- Jyutping: Haak^{3}cyun^{1} Zaam^{6}
- Hong Kong Romanization: Hak Tsuen station

General information
- Location: Middle Xingang Road (新港中路) and Xinshitou Road (新市头路); Haizhu District, Guangzhou, Guangdong; China
- Operated by: Guangzhou Metro Co. Ltd.
- Lines: Line 3; Line 8
- Platforms: 4 (2 island platforms)
- Tracks: 4

Construction
- Structure type: Underground
- Accessible: Yes

Other information
- Station code: 308 823

History
- Opened: 28 June 2003; 22 years ago (Line 8); 26 December 2005; 20 years ago (Line 3)

Services
| Preceding station | Guangzhou Metro | Following station |
|---|---|---|
| Datang towards Haibang | Line 3 | Canton Tower towards Airport North (Terminal 2) or Tianhe Coach Terminal |
| Lujiang towards Jiaoxin | Line 8 | Chigang towards Wanshengwei |
Location

Kecun station (Chinese: 客村站; Cantonese Yale: Haakchyūn Jaahm) is an interchange station between Line 3 and Line 8 of the Guangzhou Metro. The Line 8 station started operations on 28 June 2003, and the Line 3 station started operations on 26 December 2005. It is located at the underground of Kecun Village in Haizhu District.

Before the extension to both lines 2 and 8 opened in September 2010, this station ran as part of Line 2 as a single line from Wanshengwei to Sanyuanli.

== Station layout ==
| B1; Concourse | Lobby | Ticket Machines, Customer Service, Shops, Police Station, Baby Change, Safety Facilities |
| B2; Platforms | Platform 3 | 8 towards Jiaoxin (Lujiang) |
| B2; Platforms | Island platform, doors will open on the left |
| B2; Platforms | Platform 4 | 8 towards Wanshengwei (Chigang) |
| B3; Concourse | Transfer Passageway | Transfer passageway between Lines 3 & 8 |
| B4; Platforms | Platform 1 | 3 towards Haibang (Datang) |
| B4; Platforms | Island platform, doors will open on the left |
| B4; Platforms | Platform 2 | 3 towards Tianhe Coach Terminal or Airport North (Canton Tower) |

== Gallery ==
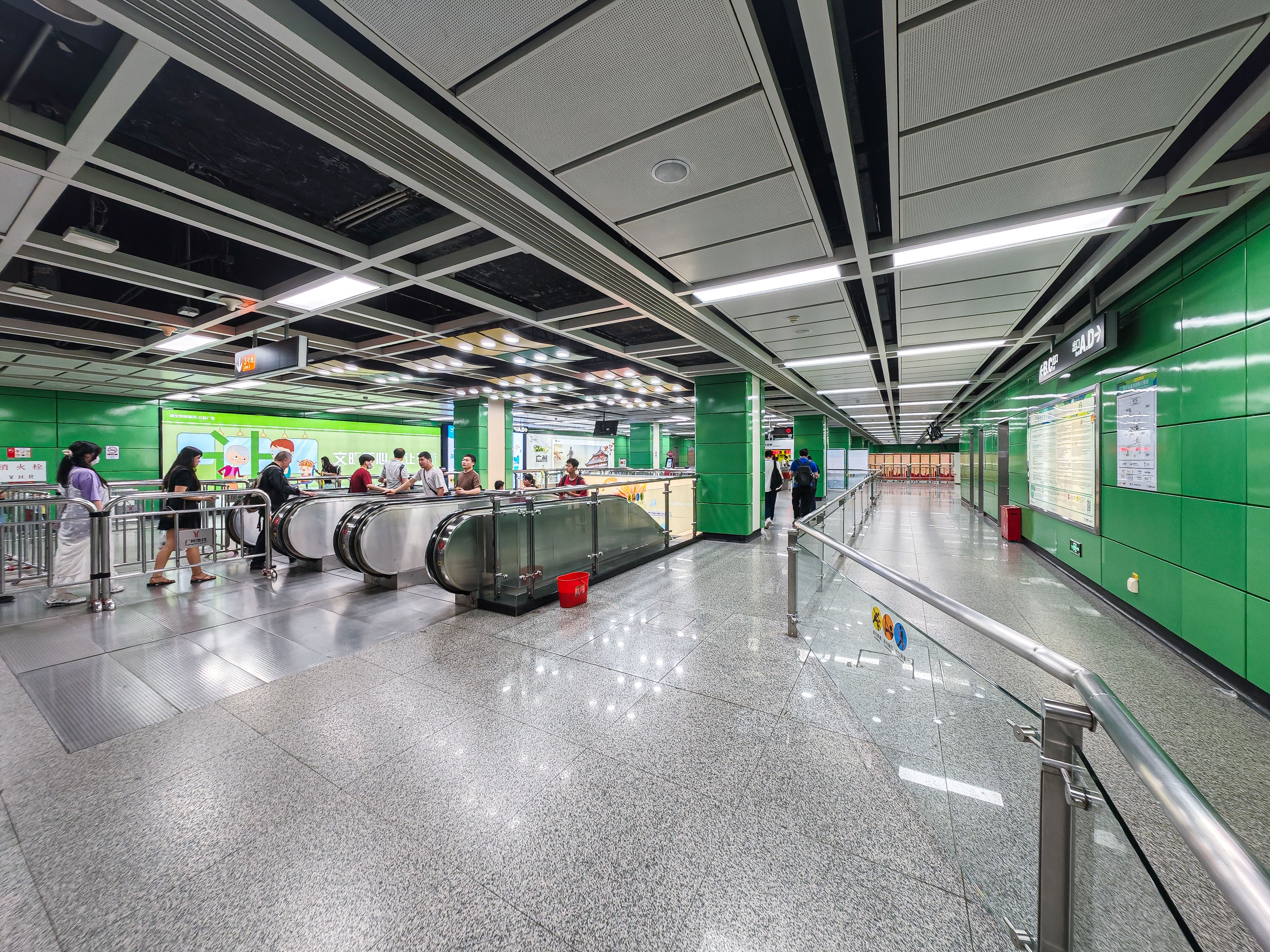
Line 3 Concourse

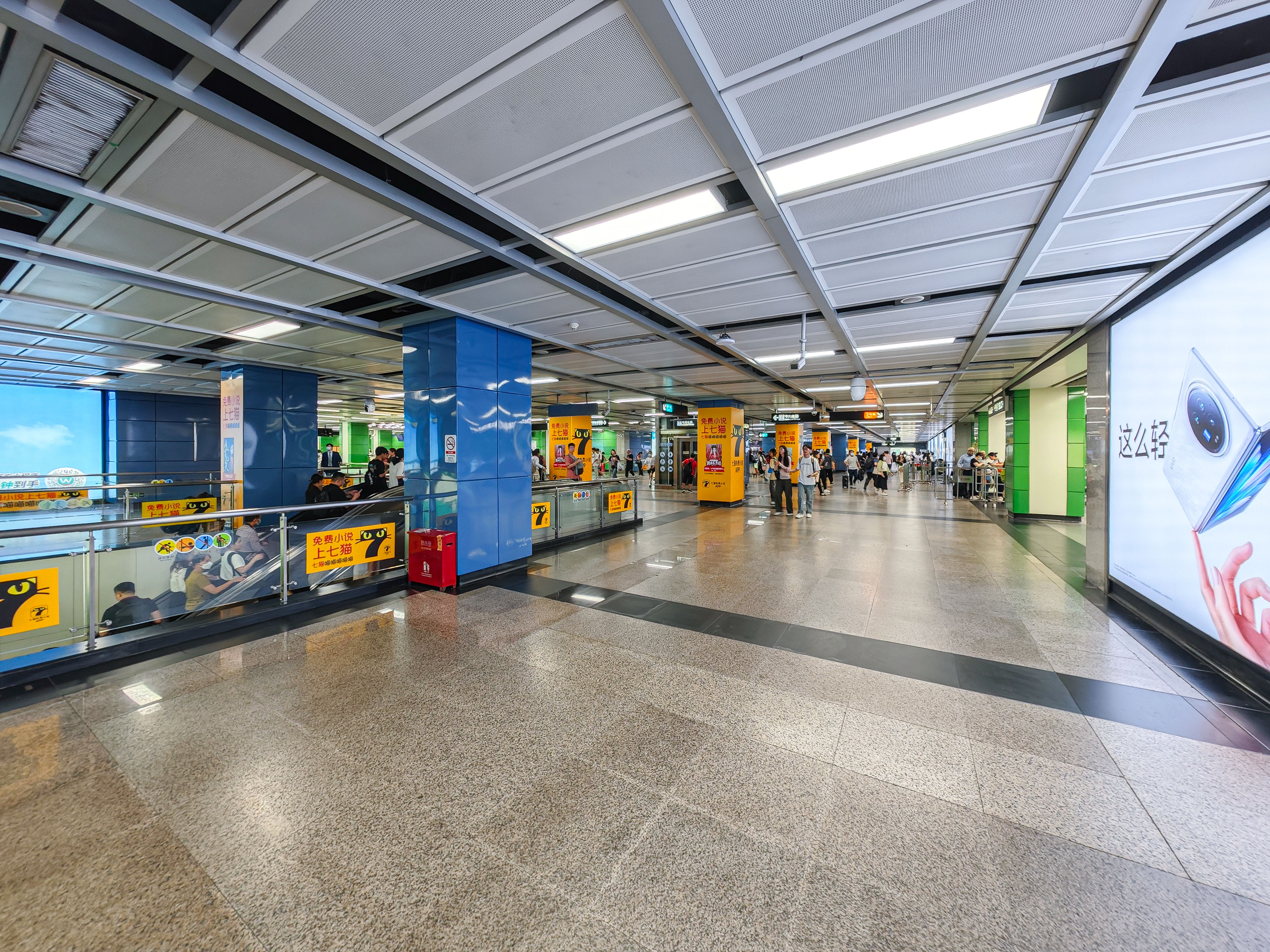
Line 8 Concourse

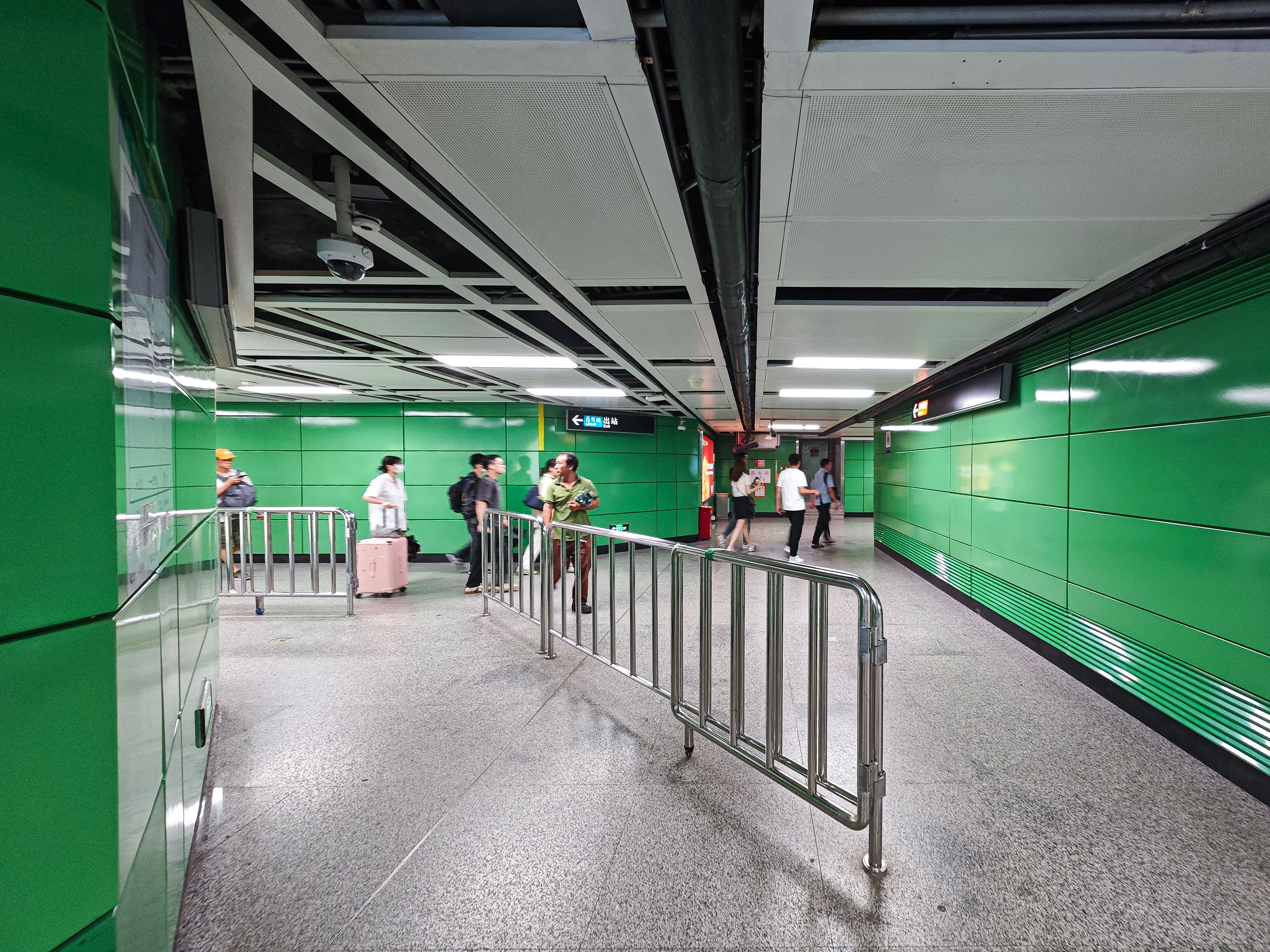
Transfer passageway

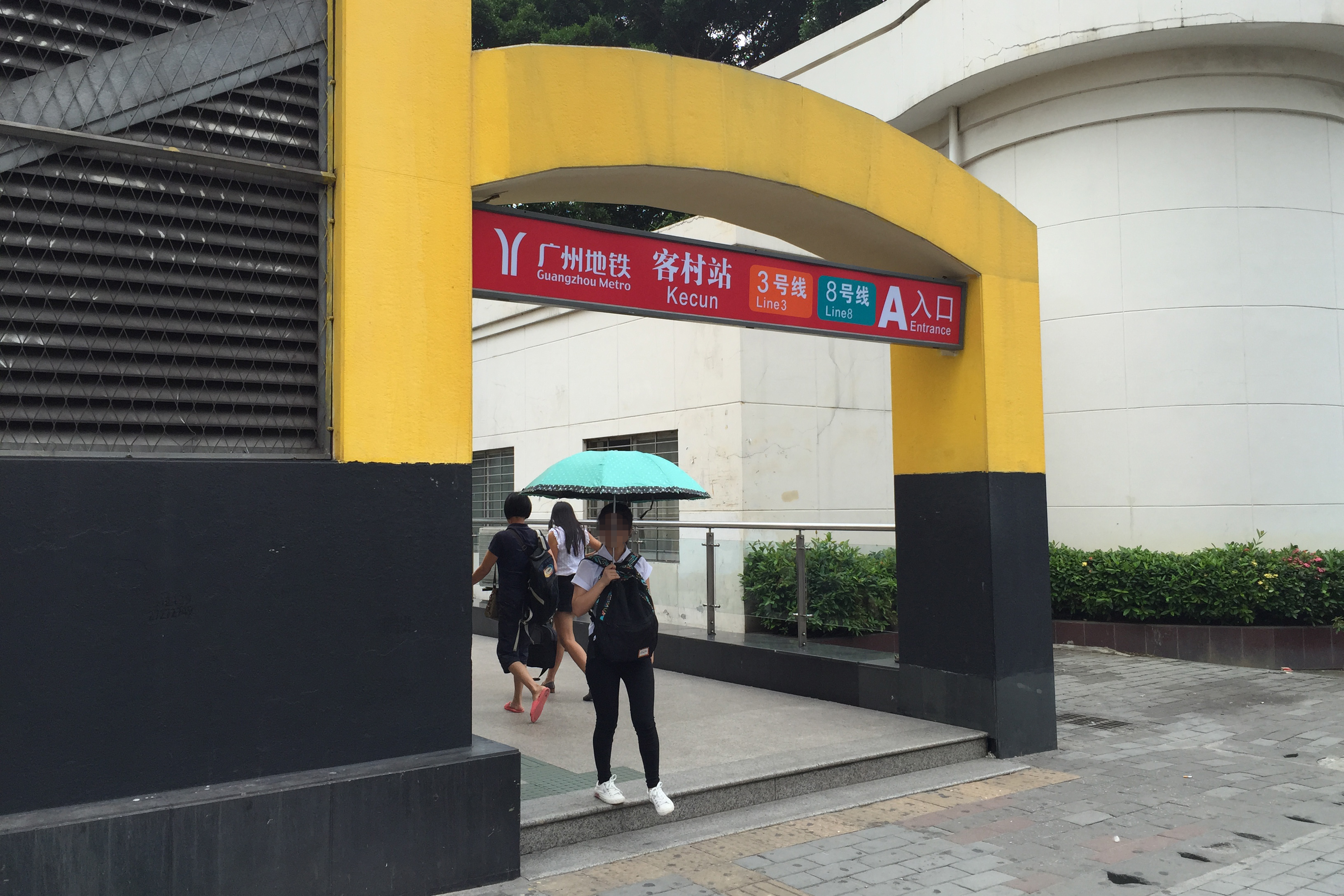
Exit A

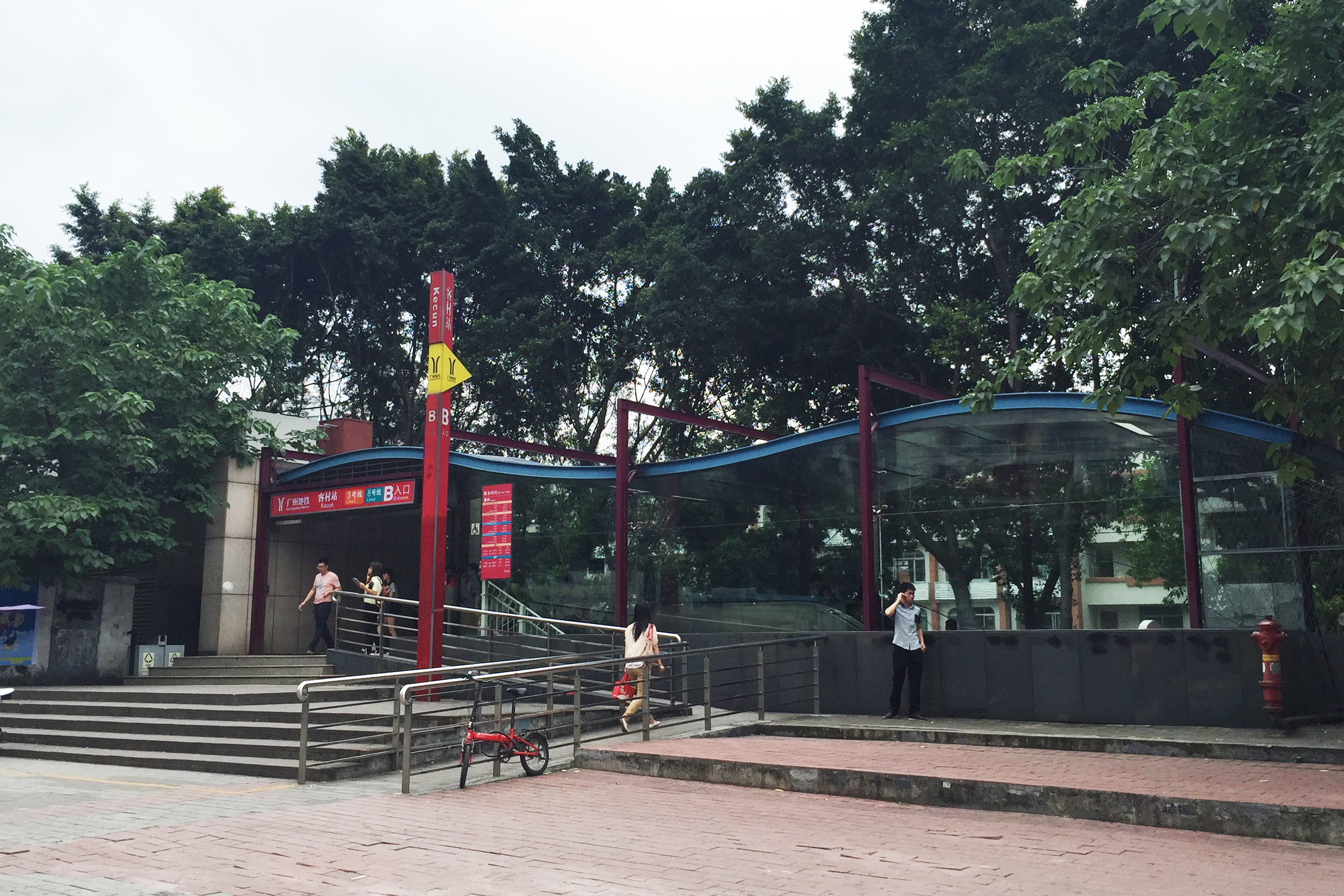
Exit B

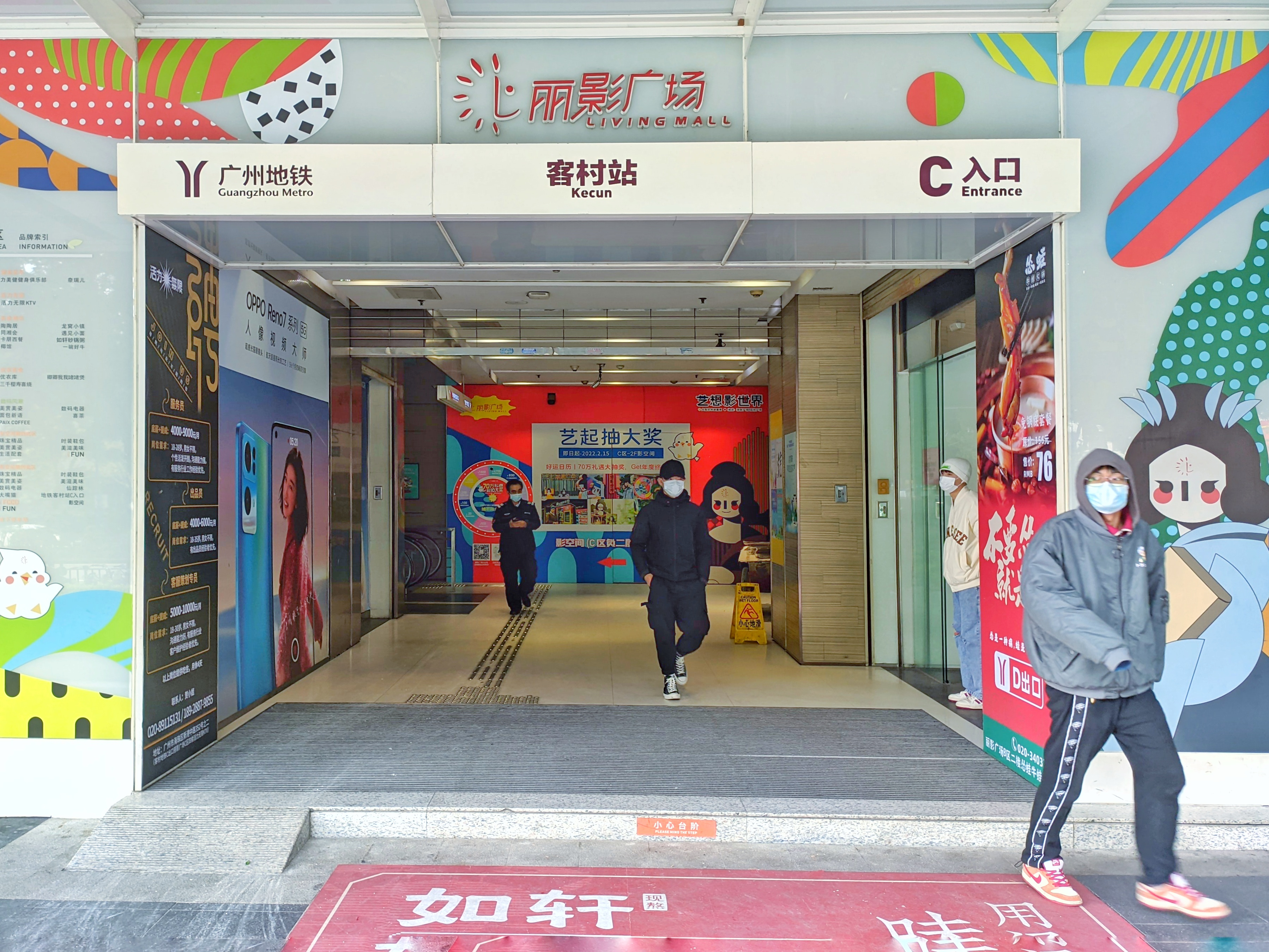
Exit C

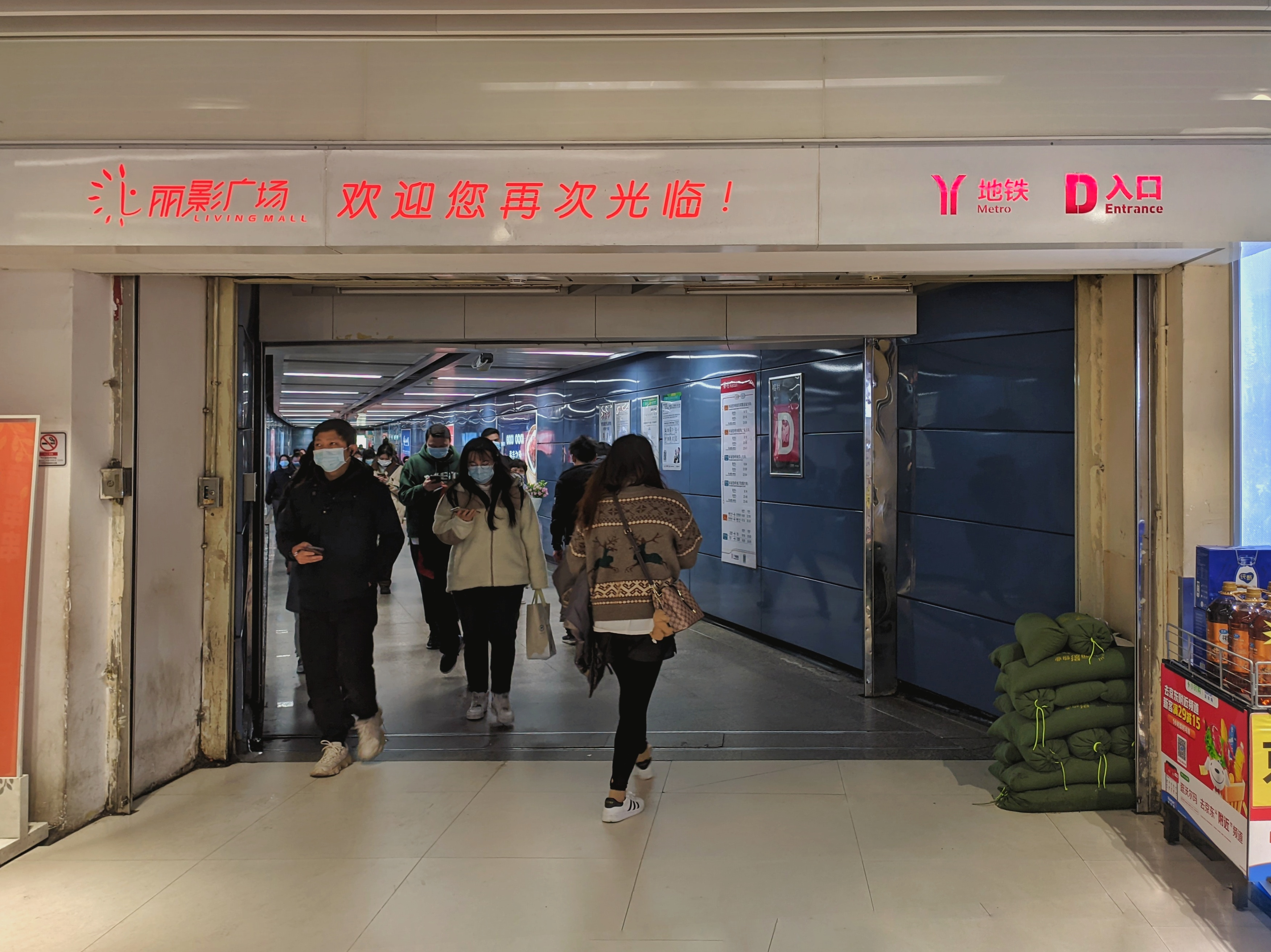
Exit D
