= Xiaogang station (Guangzhou Metro line 8) =

Guangzhou Metro station

Coordinates: 23.0932°N 113.2823°E

Xiaogang 晓港
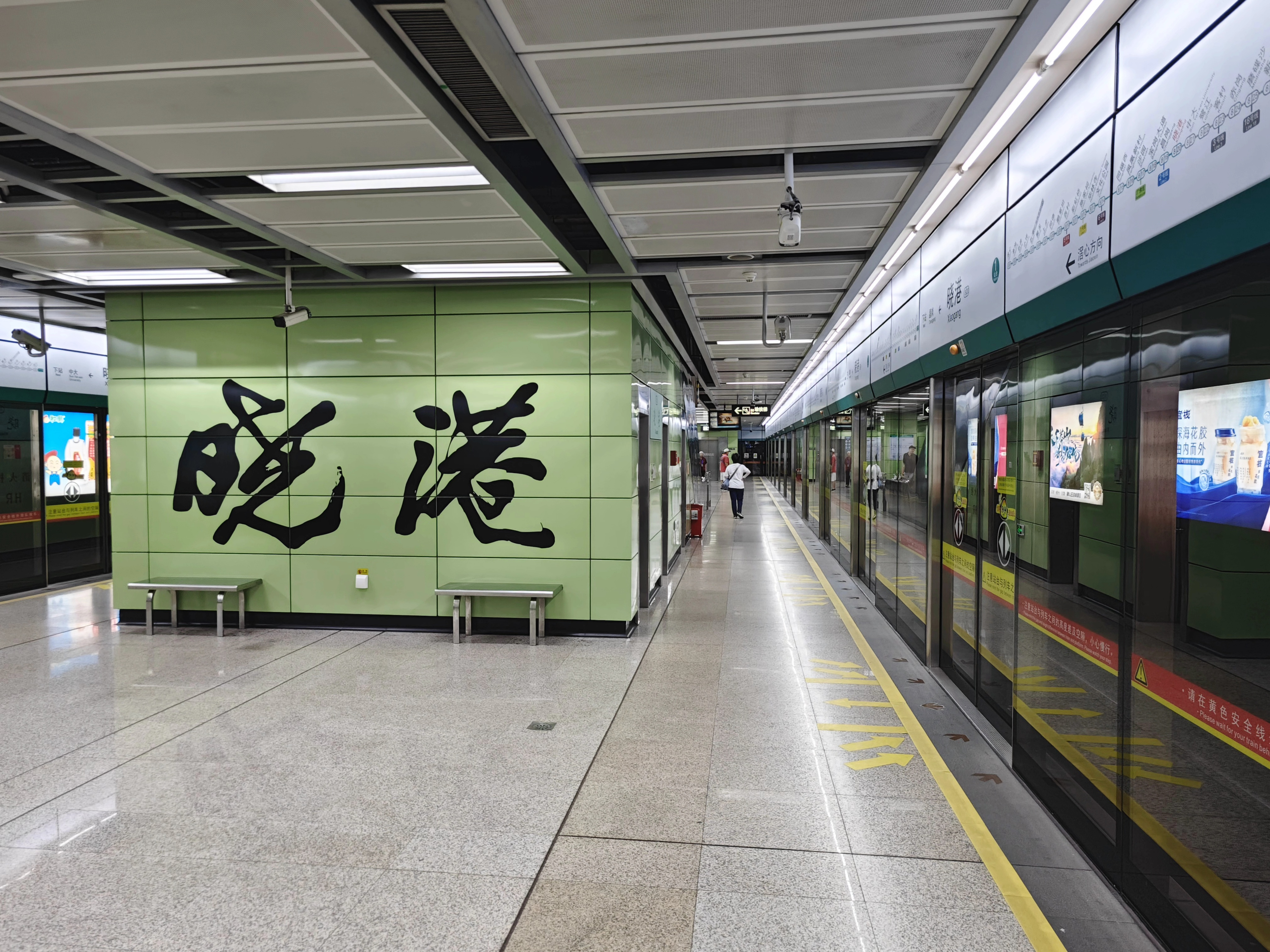

Chinese name
- Simplified Chinese: 晓港站
- Traditional Chinese: 曉港站
Transcriptions
Standard Mandarin
- Hanyu Pinyin: Xiǎogǎng Zhàn
Yue: Cantonese
- Jyutping: hiu^{2}gong^{2} zaam^{6}

General information
- Location: Haizhu District, Guangzhou, Guangdong; China
- Operated by: Guangzhou Metro Co. Ltd.
- Line: Line 8
- Platforms: 2 (1 island platform)
- Tracks: 2

Construction
- Structure type: Underground
- Accessible: Yes

Other information
- Station code: 820

History
- Opened: 29 December 2002; 23 years ago

Services
Preceding station	Guangzhou Metro	Following station
Changgang towards Jiaoxin	Line 8	Sun Yat-sen University towards Wanshengwei
Location

Xiaogang station (Chinese: 晓港站) is a station on Line 8 of the Guangzhou Metro that started operation on 29 December 2002. It is located under Changgang Road East in Haizhu District of Guangzhou.

Before the extension to both lines 2 and 8 opened in September 2010, this station ran as part of Line 2 as a single line from Wanshengwei to Sanyuanli.
