= Line 8 (Guangzhou Metro) =

Guangzhou Metro line

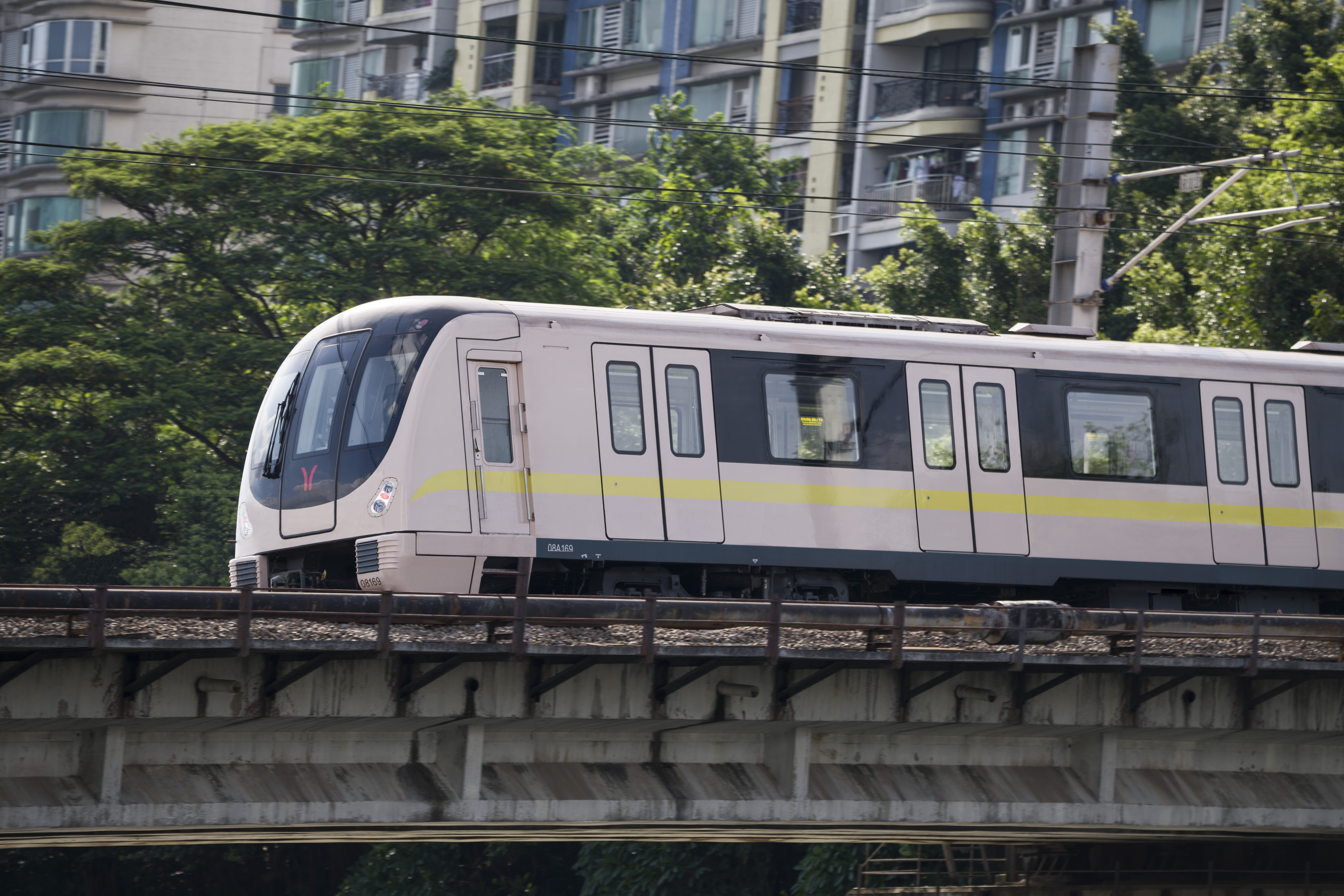
- A train of Guangzhou Metro Line 8

Overview
- Other name(s): M2e ("十" shape plan name); M2e / M3e (5 lines plan name); M4 / M5 (7 lines plan name); M8 (2000 plan name); Pazhou line (琶洲线)
- Status: Operational
- Owner: City of Guangzhou
- Locale: Haizhu, Liwan and Baiyun Districts; Guangzhou, Guangdong
- Termini: Jiaoxin; Wanshengwei
- Stations: 28

Service
- Type: Rapid transit
- System: Guangzhou Metro
- Services: 1
- Operator: Guangzhou Metro Corporation
- Rolling stock: ?? CRRC Zhuzhou Locomotive Metro cars
- Daily ridership: 910,700 (2025 daily average); 878,000 (2019 Peak)

History
- Opened: 25 September 2010; 15 years ago

Technical
- Line length: 33.9 km (21.1 mi)
- Number of tracks: 2
- Character: Underground
- Track gauge: 1,435 mm (4 ft 8 1/2 in)
- Electrification: Overhead lines, 1,500 V DC
- Operating speed: 80 km/h (49.7 mph)

Line 8
- Simplified Chinese: 广州地铁8号线
- Traditional Chinese: 廣州地鐵8號線
- Cantonese Yale: Gwóngjāu Deihtit Baat Houh Sin
Transcriptions
Standard Mandarin
- Hanyu Pinyin: Guǎngzhōu Dìtiě Bā Hào Xiàn
Yue: Cantonese
- Yale Romanization: Gwóngjāu Deihtit Baat Houh Sin
- Jyutping: gwong2 zau1 dei6 tit3 baat3 hou6 sin3
- Canton Romanization: guong2 zeo1 déi6 tid3 bad3 hou6 xin3

Line 8 of the Guangzhou Metro is a north-west L-shaped line on the system that runs from Jiaoxin to Wanshengwei, spanning a total of 33.9 km (21.06 mi) with 28 stations. It interchanges with Line 1 at Chen Clan Academy, Line 2 at Changgang, Line 3 at Kecun, Line 4 at Wanshengwei, Line 6 at Cultural Park, Line 11 at Pazhou, Line 12 at Julong and Chigang and Line 18 at Modiesha. All stations on Line 8 are underground. Line 8's color is teal.

Line 8 used to run as part of Line 2 until the extension to both lines opened for trial operation on 25 September 2010, and Changgang to Fenghuang Xincun started operation on 3 November 2010. With the northern extension of Line 8, daily ridership is projected to immediately reach 960,000 passengers per day, growing to 1.33 million per day in the short term and topping 1.65 million per day in the long-term.

== History ==
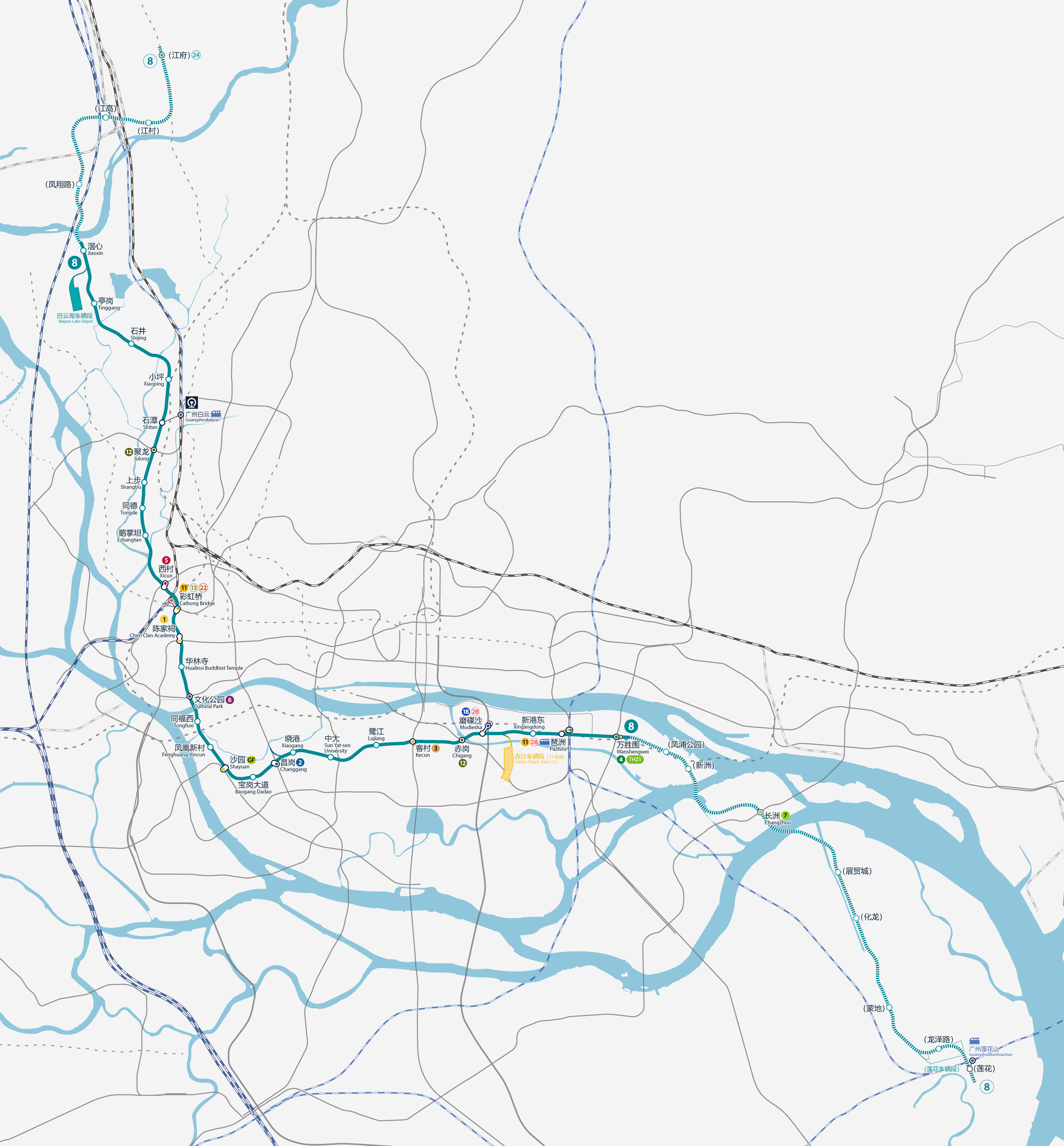
Line 8 drawn to scale.

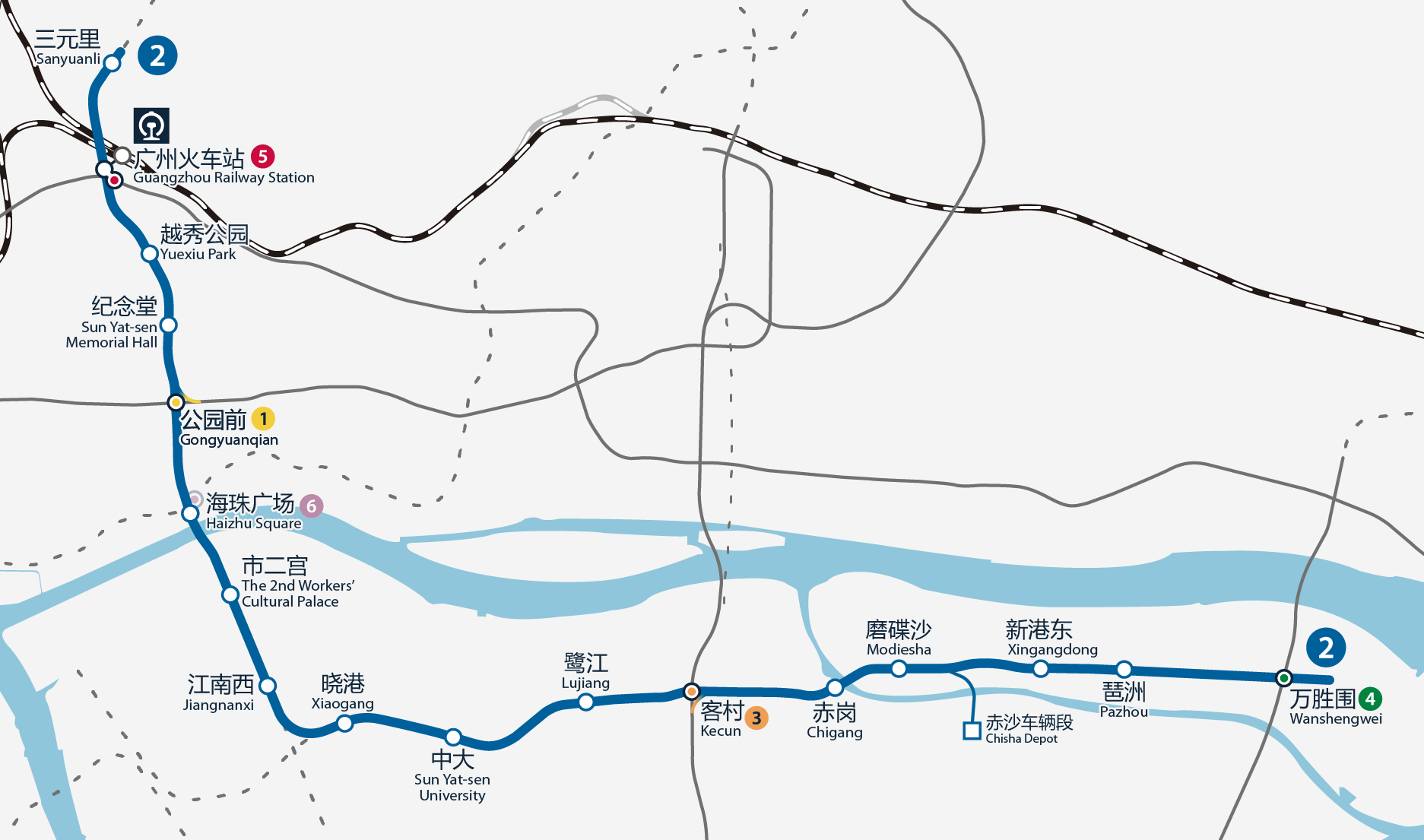
The former alignment of Line 2 before the creation of Line 8 drawn to scale.

- 2004 - The Line 2 and 8 realignment project; and Line 8 Cultural Park to Xiaogang extension was announced. Creating Line 8 by splitting off the southeastern portion (Xiaogang to Wanshengwei) from Line 2.
- June 2007 - Line 2 and 8 realignment; and Line 8 phase 1 (Cultural Park to Xiaogang extension) was approved by the NDRC.
- 1 August 2007 - Construction of Line 2 and 8 realignment project; and Line 8 phase 1 extension officially commenced.
- 10 March 2010 - Line 8 phase 2 (northern extension) was announced by extend Line 8 from Liwan to Baiyun.
- 21 September 2010 - Line 2's services of train bound between Sanyuanli to Wanshengwei ends.
- 25 September 2010 - Line 2 and 8 realignment project; and Line 8 phase 1 extension first section was completed and enter operation.
- 3 November 2010 - Line 2 and 8 realignment project; and Line 8 phase 1 extension second section enter operation.
- 9 July 2014 - Line 8 phase 3 (further north extension) was announced by further extend Line 8 from Baiyun to Huadu.
- 28 December 2019 - The section from Cultural Park to Fenghuang Xincun was opened.
- 26 November 2020 - The section from Cultural Park to Jiaoxin was opened, except for Xicun and Caihongqiao stations.
- 28 September 2022 - Caihongqiao station was opened.
- 28 December 2022 - Xicun station was opened.

Segment	Commencement	Length	Station(s)	Name
Xiaogang — Wanshengwei	25 September 2010	10.8 km (6.71 mi)	9	Line 2 & 8 realignment project
Changgang — Xiaogang	25 September 2010	0.6 km (0.37 mi)	1	Line 2 & 8 realignment project
Fenghuang Xincun — Changgang	3 November 2010	4.4 km (2.73 mi)	3	Line 2 & 8 realignment project
Cultural Park — Fenghuang Xincun	28 December 2019	1.8 km (1.12 mi)	2	Line 2 & 8 realignment project
Jiaoxin — Cultural Park	26 November 2020	16.3 km (10.13 mi)	11	Northern extension
Caihong Bridge	28 September 2022	Infill station	1	Northern extension
Xicun	28 December 2022	Infill station	1	Northern extension

== Stations ==
Service routes		Station no.	Station name		Connections	Future Connections	Distance km		Location
Service routes		Station no.	English	Chinese	Connections	Future Connections	Distance km		Location
●		801	Jiaoxin	滘心			0.00	0.00	Baiyun
●		802	Tinggang	亭岗			1.66	1.66	Baiyun
●		803	Shijing	石井			1.83	3.49	Baiyun
●		804	Xiaoping	小坪			2.00	5.49	Baiyun
●		805	Shitan	石潭	GBA GQ		1.35	6.84	Baiyun
●	●	806	Julong	聚龙	12 1204		0.79	7.63	Baiyun
●	●	807	Shangbu	上步			1.14	8.77	Baiyun
●	●	808	Tongde	同德			0.85	9.62	Baiyun
●	●	809	Ezhangtan	鹅掌坦			0.83	10.45	Baiyun
●	●	810	Xicun	西村	5 505		1.86	12.31	Liwan
●	●	811	Caihong Bridge	彩虹桥	11 1116	13 1309 22	0.96	13.27	Liwan
●	●	812	Chen Clan Academy	陈家祠	1 107		1.05	14.32	Liwan
●	●	813	Hualinsi Buddhist Temple	华林寺			0.76	15.08	Liwan
●	●	814	Cultural Park	文化公园	6 608		1.02	16.10	Liwan
●	●	815	Tongfuxi	同福西			0.88	16.98	Haizhu
●	●	816	Fenghuang Xincun	凤凰新村			0.86	17.84	Haizhu
●	●	817	Shayuan	沙园	Guangfo GF21		0.83	18.67	Haizhu
●	●	818	Baogang Dadao	宝岗大道			1.05	19.72	Haizhu
●	●	819	Changgang	昌岗	2 209		0.84	20.56	Haizhu
●	●	820	Xiaogang	晓港			0.67	21.23	Haizhu
●	●	821	Sun Yat-sen University	中大			1.19	22.42	Haizhu
●	●	822	Lujiang	鹭江			1.69	24.11	Haizhu
●	●	823	Kecun	客村	3 308		1.24	25.35	Haizhu
●	●	824	Chigang	赤岗	12 1219		1.48	26.83	Haizhu
●	●	825	Modiesha	磨碟沙	18 1807	28	0.77	27.60	Haizhu
●	●	826	Xingangdong	新港东			1.57	29.17	Haizhu
●	●	827	Pazhou	琶洲	11 1102 ER PL	28	0.99	30.16	Haizhu
●	●	828	Wanshengwei	万胜围	4 421; THZ1 THZ110		1.83	31.99	Haizhu

=== Further North Extension ===
Part of Phase 3 adjustment plan of Guangzhou Metro, now under review by the National Development and Reform Commission as of September 2022. This extension will bring Line further North beyond Jiaoxin Station. The extension will have provisions to be divided into two lines at Jiangfu Station. With the northern section of Line 8 between Jiangfu Station and Guangzhou North Railway Station will be spun off to form the new Line 24.

However, according to the latest environmental impact assessment announcement, Line 24 is used as an extension of Line 8 to announce the line design information. The part to the north of Jiangfu Station is taken as part of the further north extension of Line 8, and the part to the south of Jiangfu Station is taken as the "Subline of the North Extension of Line 8". Even so, the line specifications of these two parts are still configured according to the separate Line 24, because it avoids the need to increase the number of new service lines when it is submitted to the National Development and Reform Commission for approval.

Station name		Connections	Location
English	Chinese	Connections	Location
Jiangfu	江府	24	Baiyun
Jiangcun	江村		Baiyun
Jianggao	江高	GQ	Baiyun
Fengxiang Road	凤翔路		Baiyun

=== East Extension ===
- Under construction. The extension is 18 km with 7 new stations.

Station name		Connections	Location
English	Chinese	Connections	Location
Fengpu Park	凤浦公园		Haizhu
Xinzhou	新洲		Haizhu
Changzhou	长洲	7 711	Huangpu
Exhibition & Trade City	展贸城		Panyu
Hualong	化龙		Panyu
Mengdi	蒙地		Panyu
Longze Road	龙泽路		Panyu
Lianhua	莲花	GLA GH PL	Panyu
