= Lujiang station =

Guangzhou Metro station

Coordinates: 23.09537°N 113.30842°E

Lujiang 鹭江
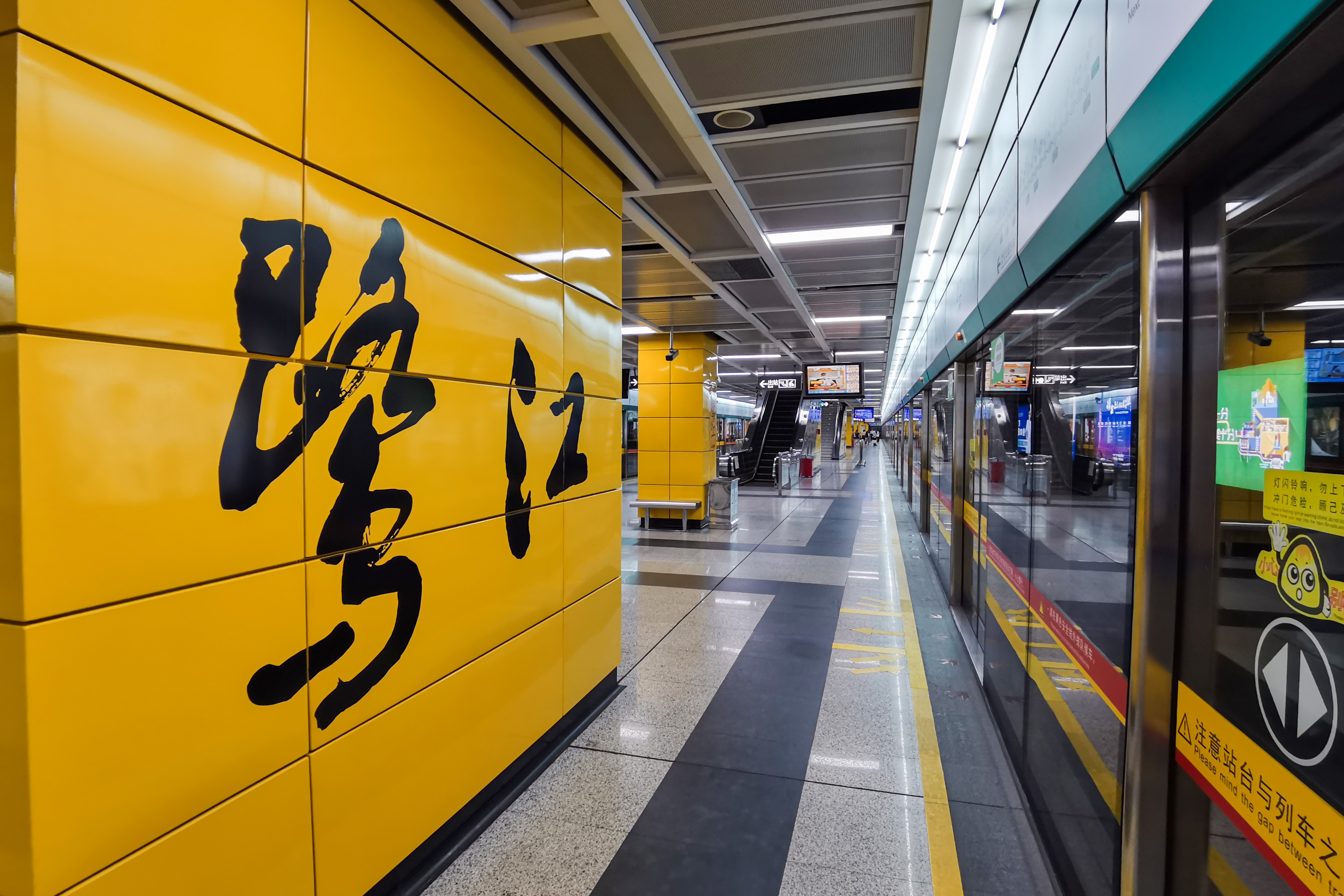

Chinese name
- Simplified Chinese: 鹭江站
- Traditional Chinese: 鷺江站
Transcriptions
Standard Mandarin
- Hanyu Pinyin: Lùjiāng Zhàn
Yue: Cantonese
- Jyutping: lou^{6}gong^{1} zaam^{6}

General information
- Location: Haizhu District, Guangzhou, Guangdong; China
- Operated by: Guangzhou Metro Co. Ltd.
- Line: Line 8
- Platforms: 2 (1 island platform)
- Tracks: 2

Construction
- Structure type: Underground
- Accessible: Yes

Other information
- Station code: 822

History
- Opened: 28 June 2003; 22 years ago

Services
Preceding station	Guangzhou Metro	Following station
Sun Yat-sen University towards Jiaoxin	Line 8	Kecun towards Wanshengwei
Location

Lujiang Station (Chinese: 鹭江站) is a station on Line 8 of the Guangzhou Metro that started operation on 28 June 2003. It is located under Xingang Road West (新港西路) and Xiadu Road (下渡路) in the Haizhu District of Guangzhou.

Before the extension to both lines 2 and 8 opened in September 2010, this station ran as part of Line 2 as a single line from Wanshengwei to Sanyuanli.

== Station layout ==
G	-	Exits
L1; Concourse	Lobby	Customer Service, Shops, Vending machines, ATMs
L2; Platforms	Platform 1	8 towards Jiaoxin (Sun Yat-sen University)
L2; Platforms	Island Platform, doors will open on the left
L2; Platforms	Platform 2	8 towards Wanshengwei (Kecun)

== Exits ==
Exit number		Exit location
Exit A	A1	Xingang Xilu
Exit A	A2	Xiadu Lu
Exit B		Xingang Xilu
Exit C		Xingang Xilu
Exit D		Guangzhou Dadaonan
