= Yingzhou Ecological Park =

Park in Guangdong, China

Coordinates: 23.0537°N 113.3580°E

Yingzhou Ecological Park (Chinese: 瀛洲生态公园; pinyin: Yíngzhōu shēngtài gōngyuán) is an ecological park located in Xiaozhou Village, Xinjiao Town, in the south eastern Haizhu District, Guangzhou, capital of Guangdong Province, China.

== History ==
The park was founded during the Yuan dynasty (1271–1368) and covers over 130 hectares (320 acres), with more than 50,000 fruit trees. These include Lingnan fruits, Shixia longan, red carambola, wampee, lychee, guava and papaya.

== See also ==
- Xiaoguwei
- Guangzhou University Town
