= Xinjiao Town =

Town in Guangzhou, China

Coordinates: 23.0947°N 113.3200°E

Xinjiao Town (Chinese: 新滘镇; pinyin: Xīnjiào zhèn; Jyutping: San^{1}gaau^{3} zan^{3}) is a town in the Haizhu District of Guangzhou, Guangdong Province, China. The town is known for its orchards, which produce fruits such as star-fruit, pomegranate, banana, papaya, orange, and litchi. Like many neighboring communities, it is also noted for its canals, which are incorporated into the design of parts of the city, abutting houses and bridges, which date back as far as the Ming Dynasty (1279–1644). Several Qing Dynasty (1644–1911) temples are also located in the area. These features make the town a popular attraction for tourists.

== See also ==
- Yingzhou Ecological Park
