= Jiaoxin station =

Metro station in Guangzhou, China

Jiaoxin 滘心
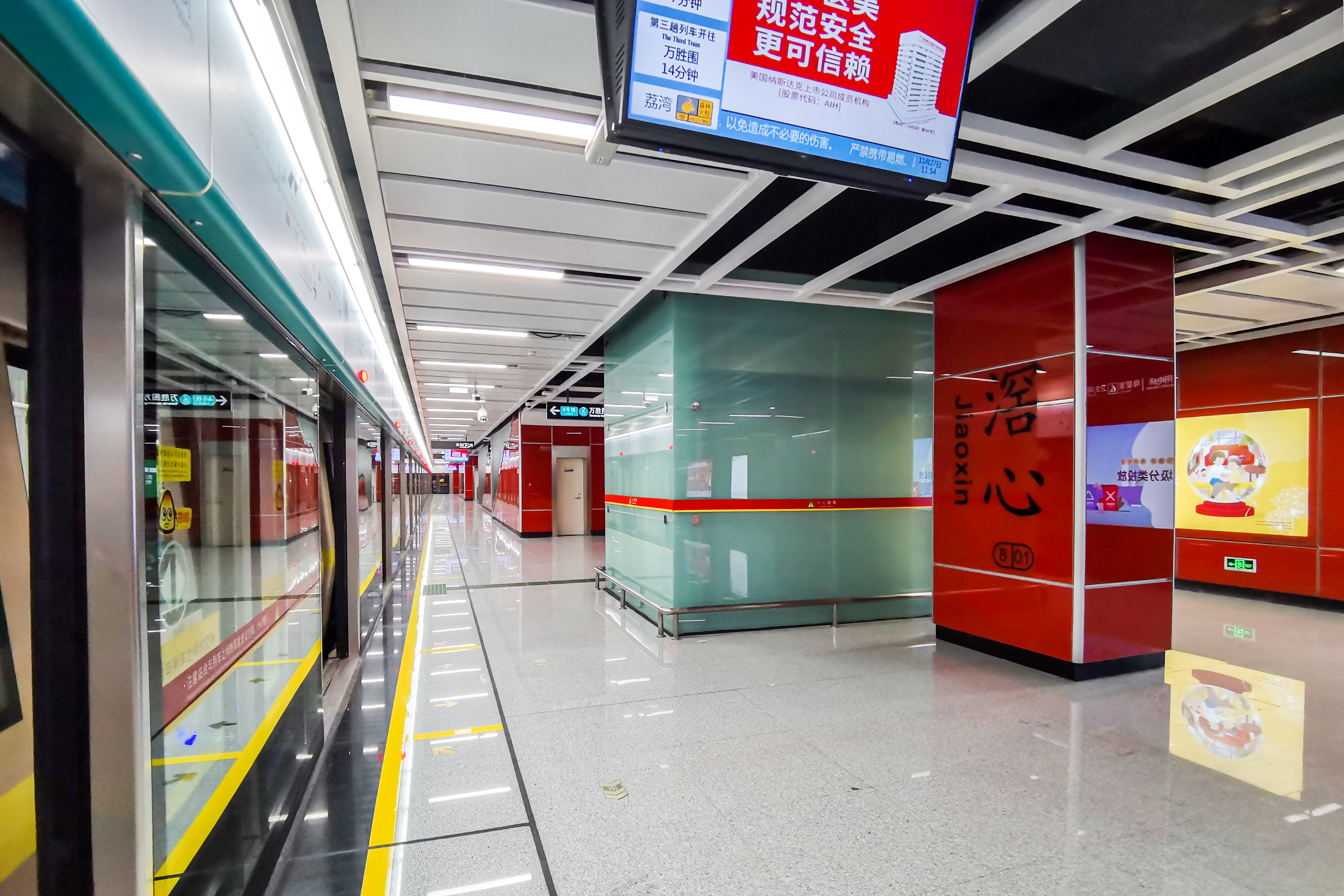
- Platform 2

Chinese name
- Simplified Chinese: 滘心站
- Traditional Chinese: 滘心站
Transcriptions

General information
- Location: Jiaoxin Estate, Baiyun District, Guangzhou, Guangdong; China
- Coordinates: 23.2392000°N 113.2117028°E
- Operated by: Guangzhou Metro Co. Ltd.
- Line: Line 8
- Platforms: 2 (2 side platforms)
- Tracks: 2

Construction
- Structure type: Underground
- Accessible: Yes

Other information
- Station code: 801

History
- Opened: 26 November 2020; 5 years ago

Services
Preceding station	Guangzhou Metro	Following station
Terminus	Line 8	Tinggang towards Wanshengwei
Location

Jiaoxin Station (Chinese: 滘心站; pinyin: Jiàoxīn Zhàn) is a station of Guangzhou Metro Line 8, located underground in Jiaoxin Estate, Baiyun District, Guangzhou, Guangdong Province, China, and is the northern terminus of the line. The station was opened on November 26, 2020 with the opening of the northern extension of Guangzhou Metro Line 8.

== History ==
As with other stations on the northern extension of Line 8, the name of this station was published on December 2, 2016.

== Station information ==
The station has 2 underground side platforms. Platform 1 is a termination platform, whilst platform 2 is for trains towards Wanshengwei. There are 4 exits, lettered A, B, C and D. Exit D is accessible. Exit A is located on Jiaoxin Road, exit B is located on Lianjiao Road and exits C and D are located on Shisha Road.

== Gallery ==
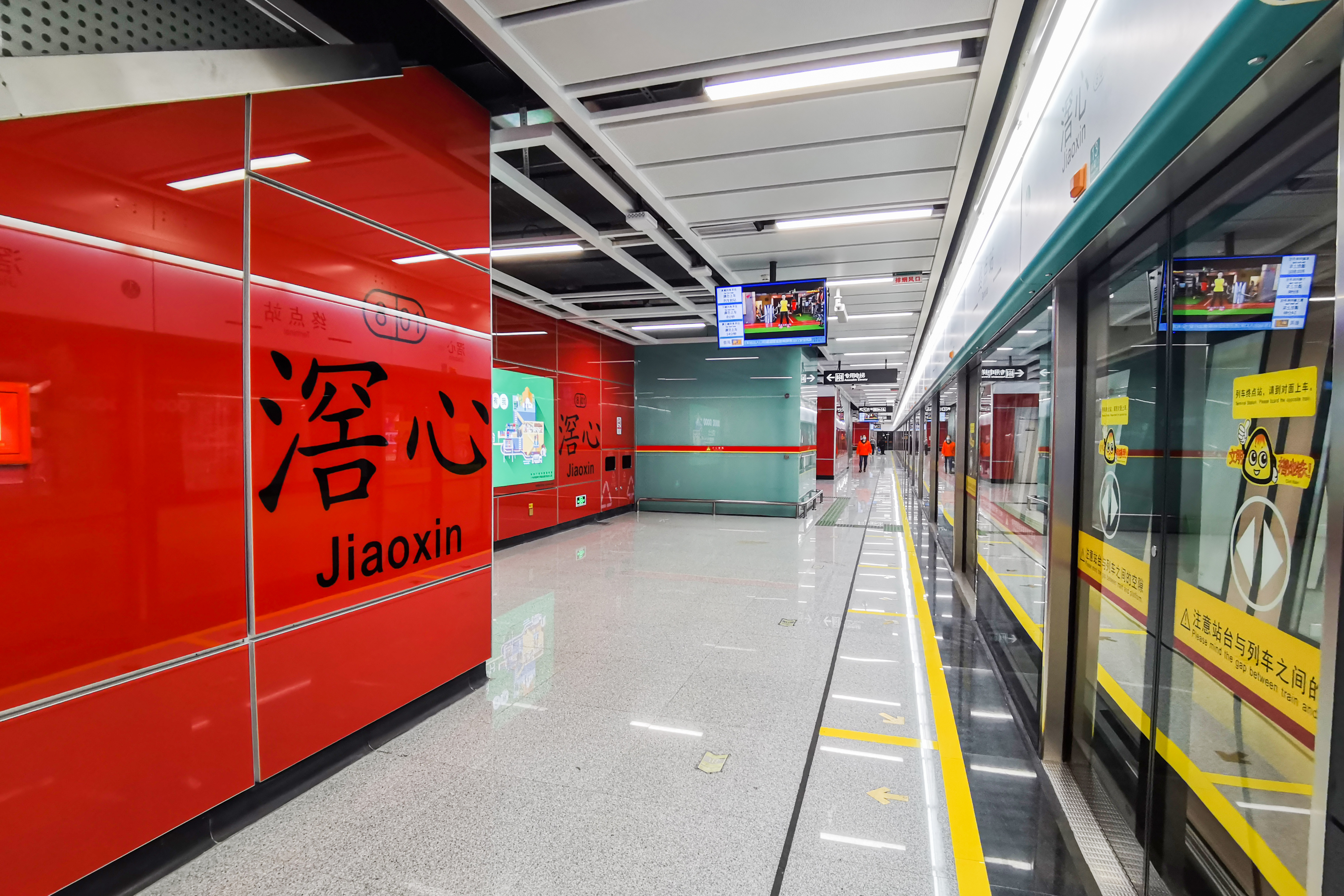
Platform 1

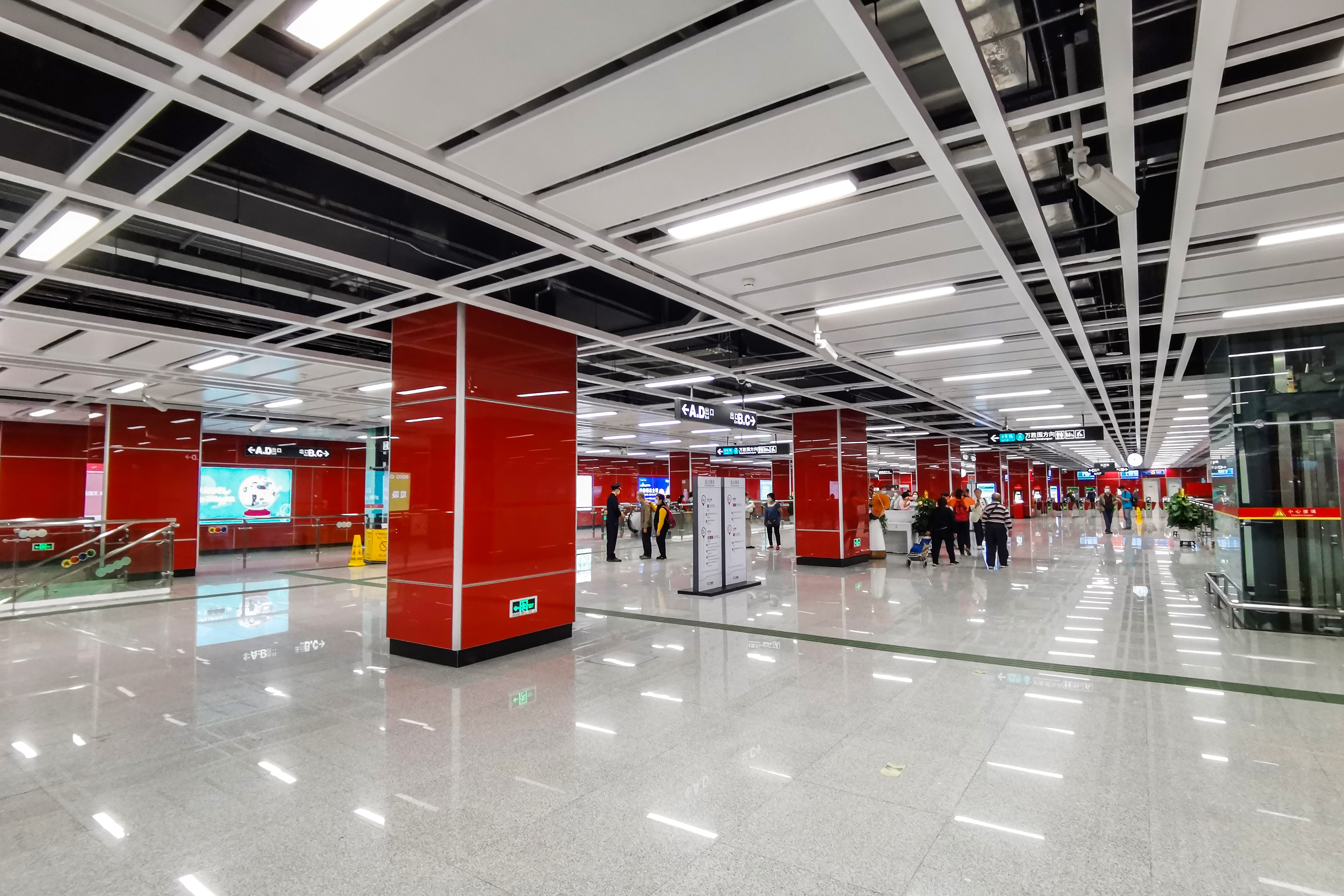
Concourse
