= Chisha station =

Guangzhou Metro Line 11 and Line 12 station

Chisha 赤沙
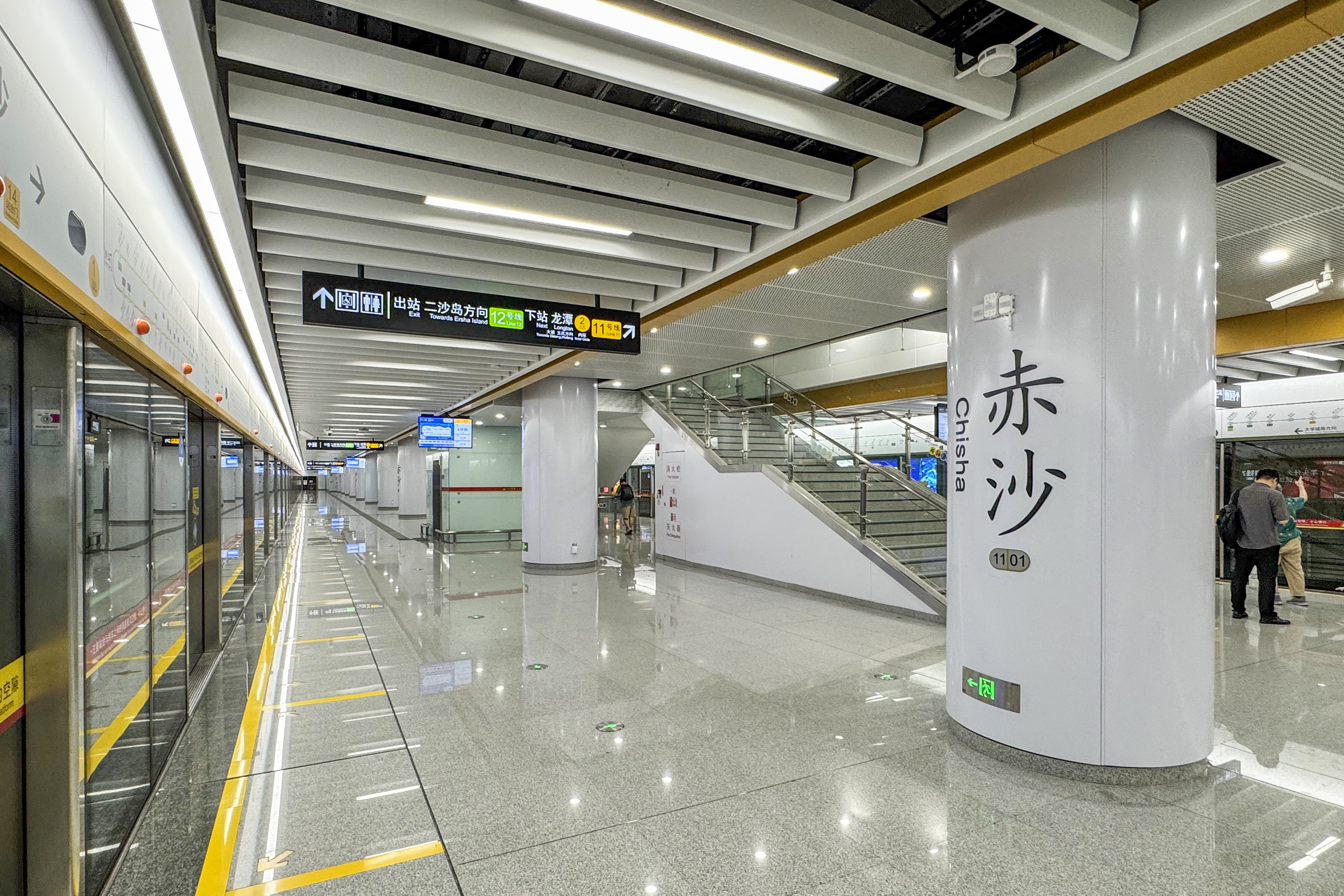
- Platform 1 (Outer circle platform of Line 11)

Chinese name
- Chinese: 赤沙站
Transcriptions
Standard Mandarin
- Hanyu Pinyin: Chìshā Zhàn
Yue: Cantonese
- Yale Romanization: Cěksāa Jaahm
- Jyutping: Cek^{3}saa^{1} Zaam^{6}

General information
- Location: Xinjiao East Road (新滘东路), east of Chishachong (赤沙涌), Guanzhou Subdistrict; Haizhu District, Guangzhou, Guangdong; China
- Coordinates: 23°5′14.17″N 113°21′30.38″E
- Operator: Guangzhou Metro Co. Ltd.
- Lines: Line 11; Line 12
- Platforms: 4 (2 island platforms)
- Tracks: 4

Construction
- Structure type: Underground
- Accessible: Yes

Other information
- Station code: 1101 1221

History
- Opened: Line 11: 28 December 2024 (19 months ago); Line 12: 29 June 2025 (13 months ago)

Services
Preceding station	Guangzhou Metro	Following station
Pazhou Outer Circle	Line 11	Longtan Inner Circle
Chisha North towards Ersha Island	Line 12 East section	Beishan towards Higher Education Mega Center South
Location

Chisha station (Chinese: 赤沙站; Jyutping: cek^{3} saa^{1} zaam^{6}; Cantonese Yale: Cěksāa Jaahm) is an interchange station between Line 11 and Line 12 of the Guangzhou Metro. The Line 11 platforms started operation on 28 December 2024. It is located underground on Xinjiao East Road in Haizhu District. The Line 11 tracks from this station are connected to Chisha Depot of Line 11, and thus is the terminating station for Inner Circle Line 11 trains returning to the depot. It became an interchange station with Line 12 on 29 June 2025 when it started operations at this station.

== Station Layout ==
The station is a two-storey underground station. The ground floor is the exit, and it is surrounded by Xinjiao Road East, Chisha Village, Pearl River Science and Technology Innovation Park and other nearby buildings. The first floor is the concourse, and the second floor are the platforms.

G	-	Exits B, C, D
L1	Lobby	Ticket Machines, Customer Service, Shops, Police Station, Security Facilities
L2; Platforms	Platform 4	12 towards Ersha Island (Chisha North)
L2; Platforms	Island platform, doors will open on the right for 11 and left for 12 (Toilets, Nursery)
L2; Platforms	Platform 2	11 Inner Circle (Longtan)
	Platform 1	11 Outer Circle (Pazhou)
Island platform, doors will open on the right for 11 and left for 12 (Toilets, Nursery)
	Platform 3	12 towards Higher Education Mega Center South (Beishan)

=== Concourse ===
The concourse of the station is equipped with electronic ticket vending machines and AI customer service centers. In addition, the automated external defibrillator is located in the unpaid area near Exits B and D. There are elevators, escalators and stairs in the fare-paid area for passengers to access the platforms.

=== Platform and transfer method ===
The station has two side-by-side island platforms, located underneath Xinjiao Road East, shared by Lines 11 and 12. Line 11 uses platforms 1 and 2 on the inner side and Line 12 uses platforms 3 and 4 on the outer side. This station is also the only station on Line 11 that has doors opening on the right side in the direction of travel.

Toilets and a nursery room are located at the western end of the platforms.

The station is a cross-platform interchange station, passengers can walk to the opposite platform and directly change to another train to their destination (e.g. Line 11 Outer Circle to Line 12 towards Higher Education Mega Center South), or via the concourse to change to another train to their destination (e.g. Line 11 Outer Circle to Line 12 towards Xunfenggang).

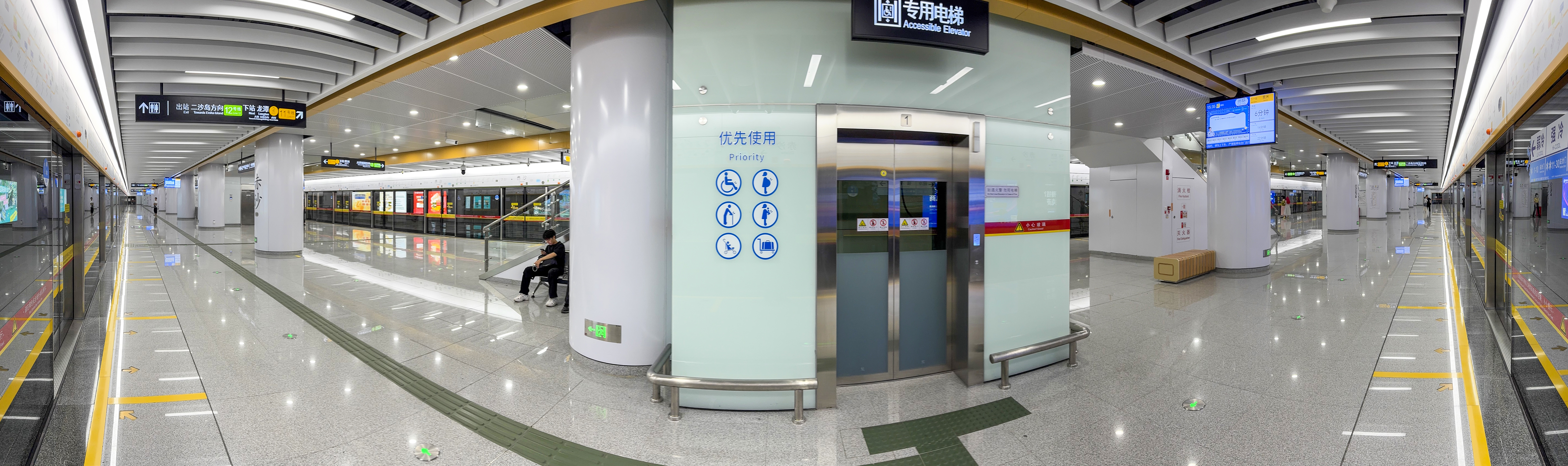
Platform 1 panorama (Line 11 Outer Circle platform)

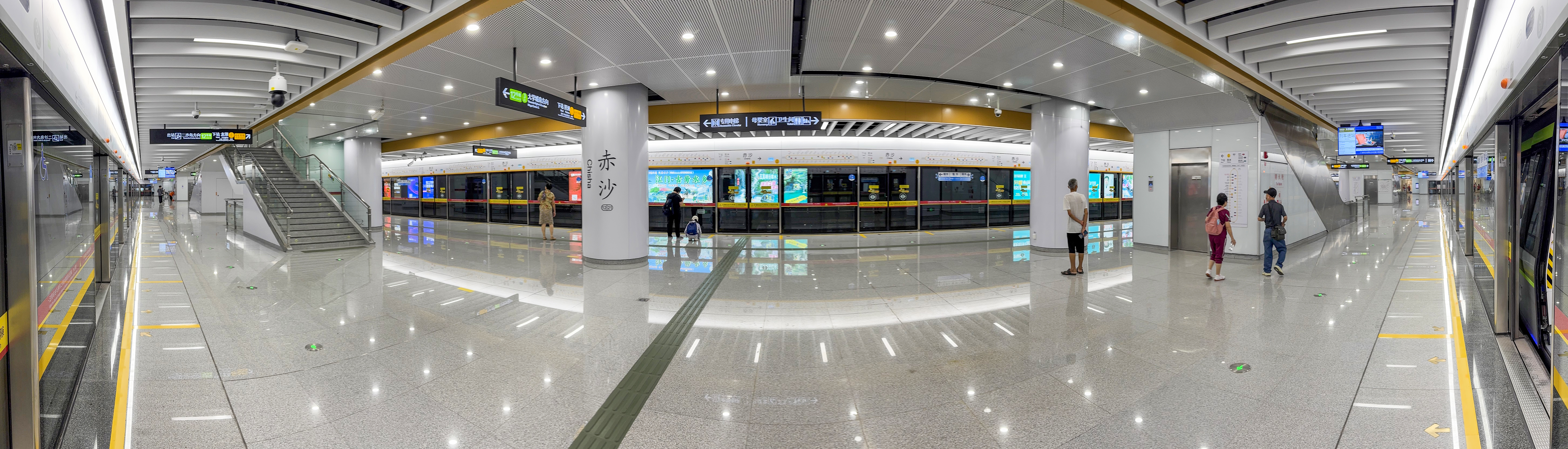
Platform 3 panorama (Line 12 towards Higher Education Mega Center South)

=== Track configuration ===
Line 11 on the inner side of this station has a set of crossovers at the west end. To the west of the crossing line, the two main lines each lead to a siding line as an entry and exit line to access the Chisha Depot. After the morning and evening rush hours of Line 11 and the last few trains before the evening close, the Inner Circle trains will terminate at this station and will clear passengers after arriving at platform 2, before returning directly to the Chisha Depot through the entry and exit lines. At the same time, there are also two one-way lines connecting to Line 12 for connection purposes.

=== Entrances/exits ===
The station has 3 points of entry/exit. Exit D is equipped with an elevator. In addition, in order to comply with the fire evacuation requirements of the Line 12 platforms when they opened, there is an unassigned entrance/exit at the southwest corner of the station for passengers to enter and exit.

- Passage: Xinjiao East Road
- B: Xinjiao East Road
- C: Xinjiao East Road
- D: Xinjiao East Road
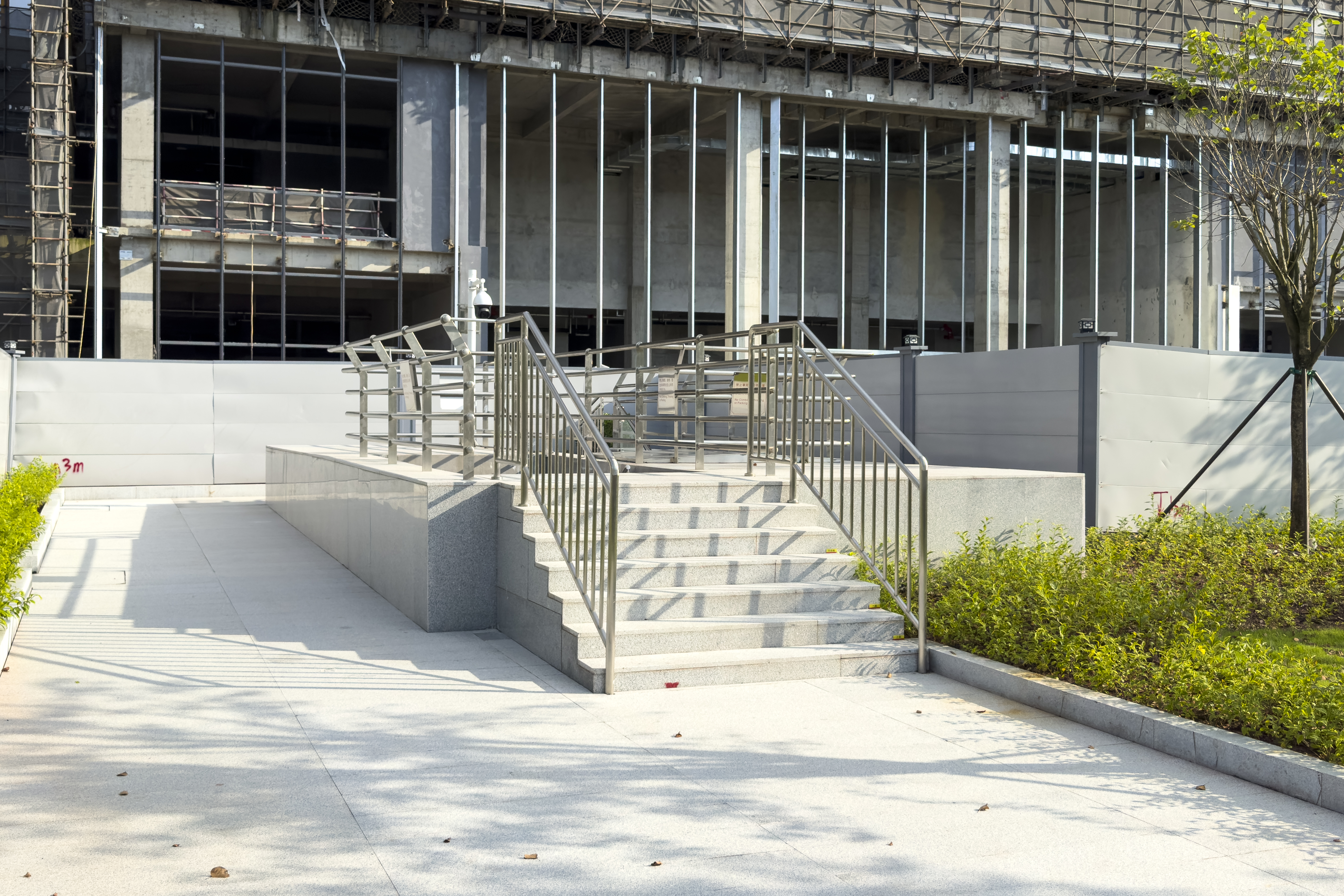
Unassigned entrance

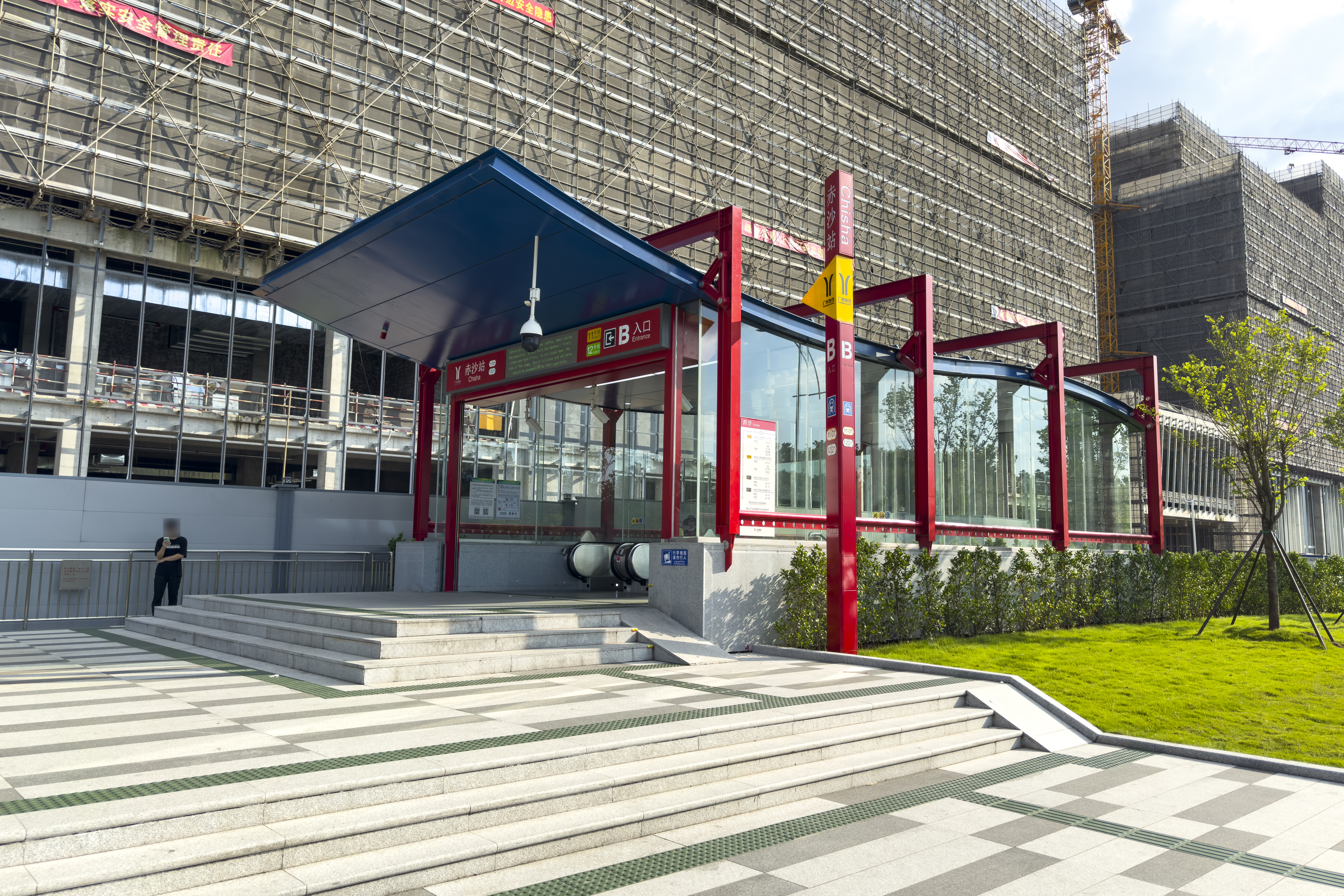
Entrance B

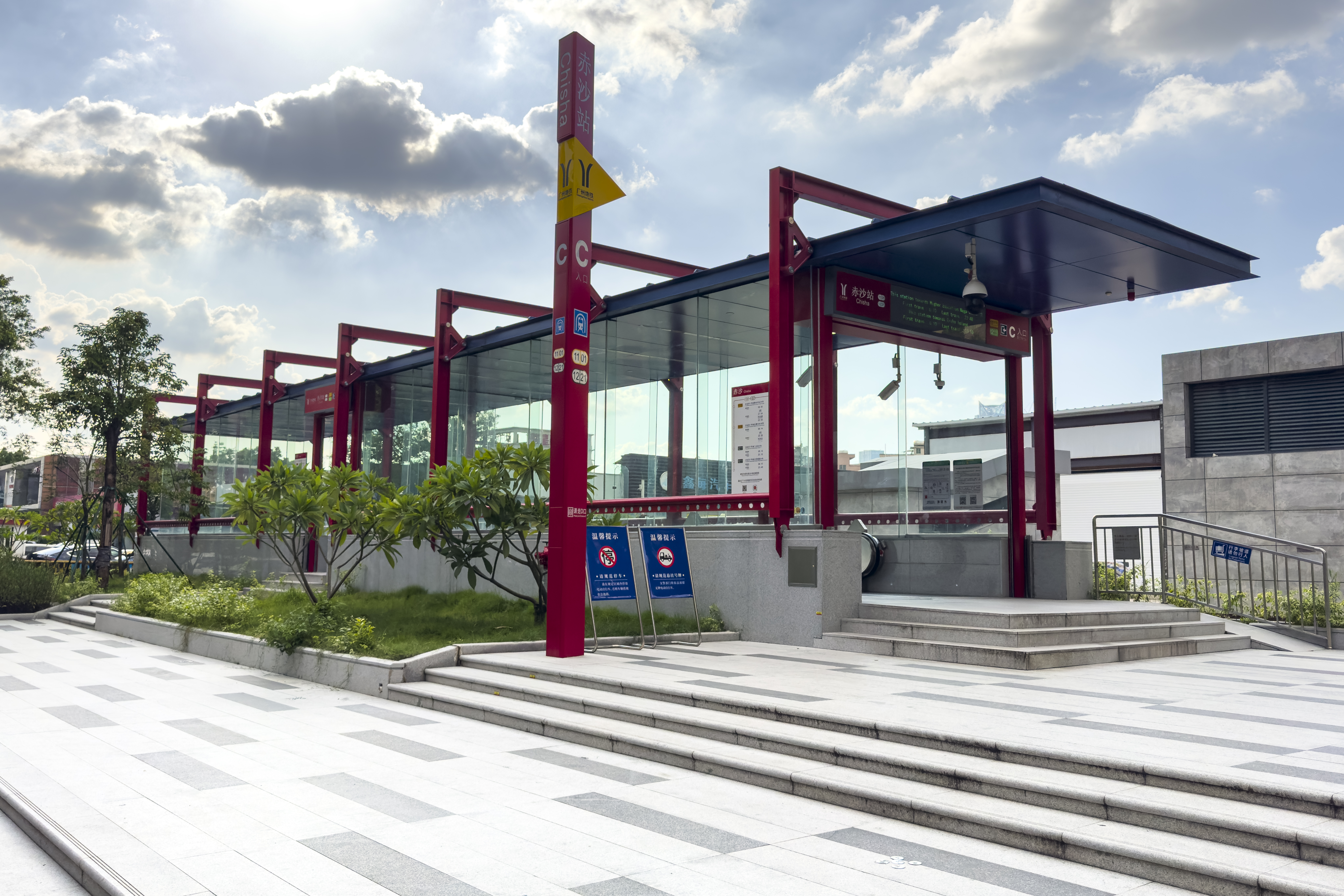
Entrance C

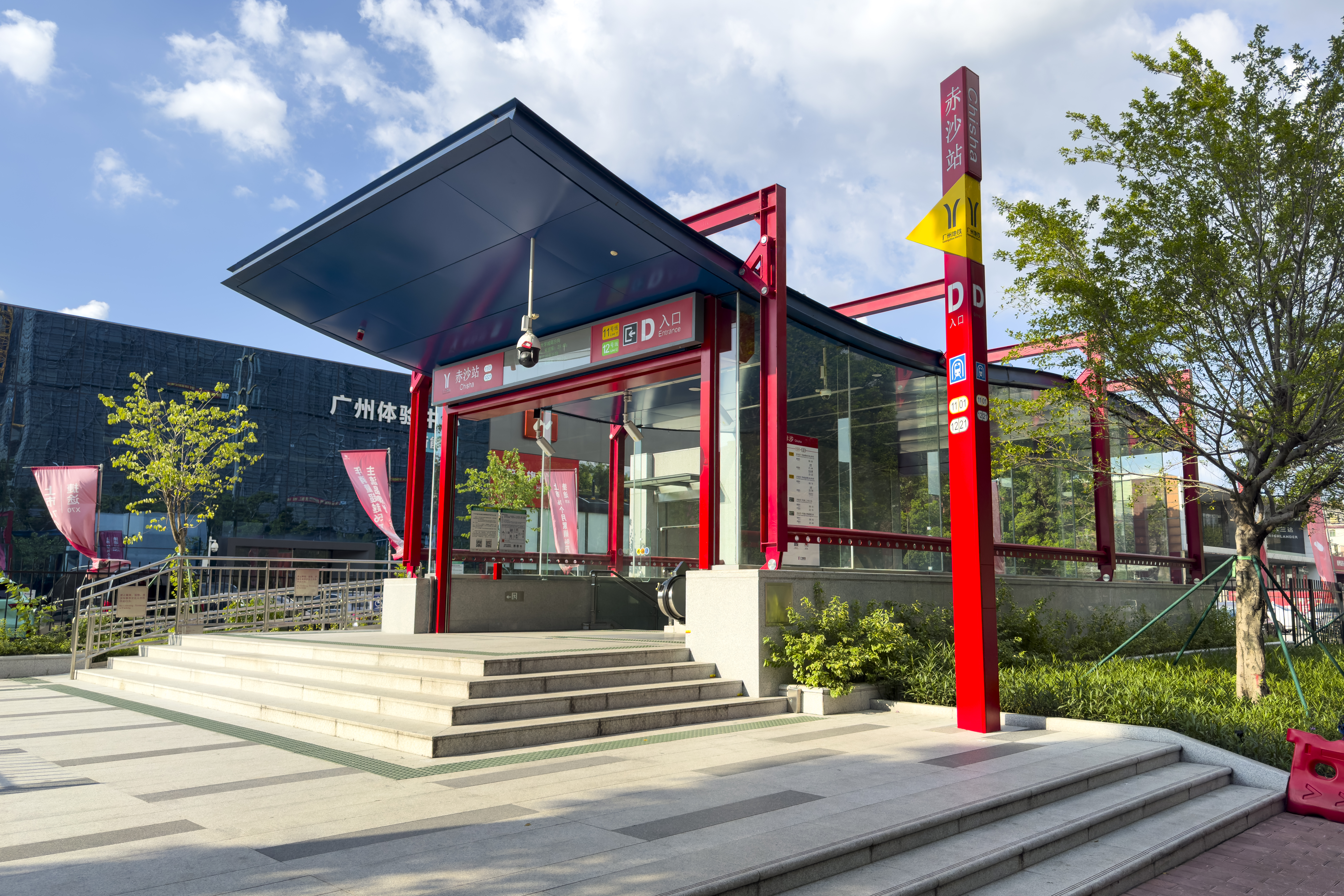
Entrance D

== History ==
This station first appeared in 2009 in the "Super Big Ring Line" scheme of Line 11, and was then known as Chisha station. The plan was subsequently adopted, and the construction of the station began under the name of Chishajiao station. However, in June 2023, Guangzhou Metro Group announced the initial name of the stations on Line 11, and the name of the station is planned to be restored to Chisha Station. In May 2024, it was approved as the official station name.

On 30 July 2024, the station completed the "three rights" transfer. At 12:00 on 28 December, the station was opened with the opening of Line 11.

On 29 June 2025, the Line 12 platforms were opened, and this station became an interchange station.

== Gallery ==
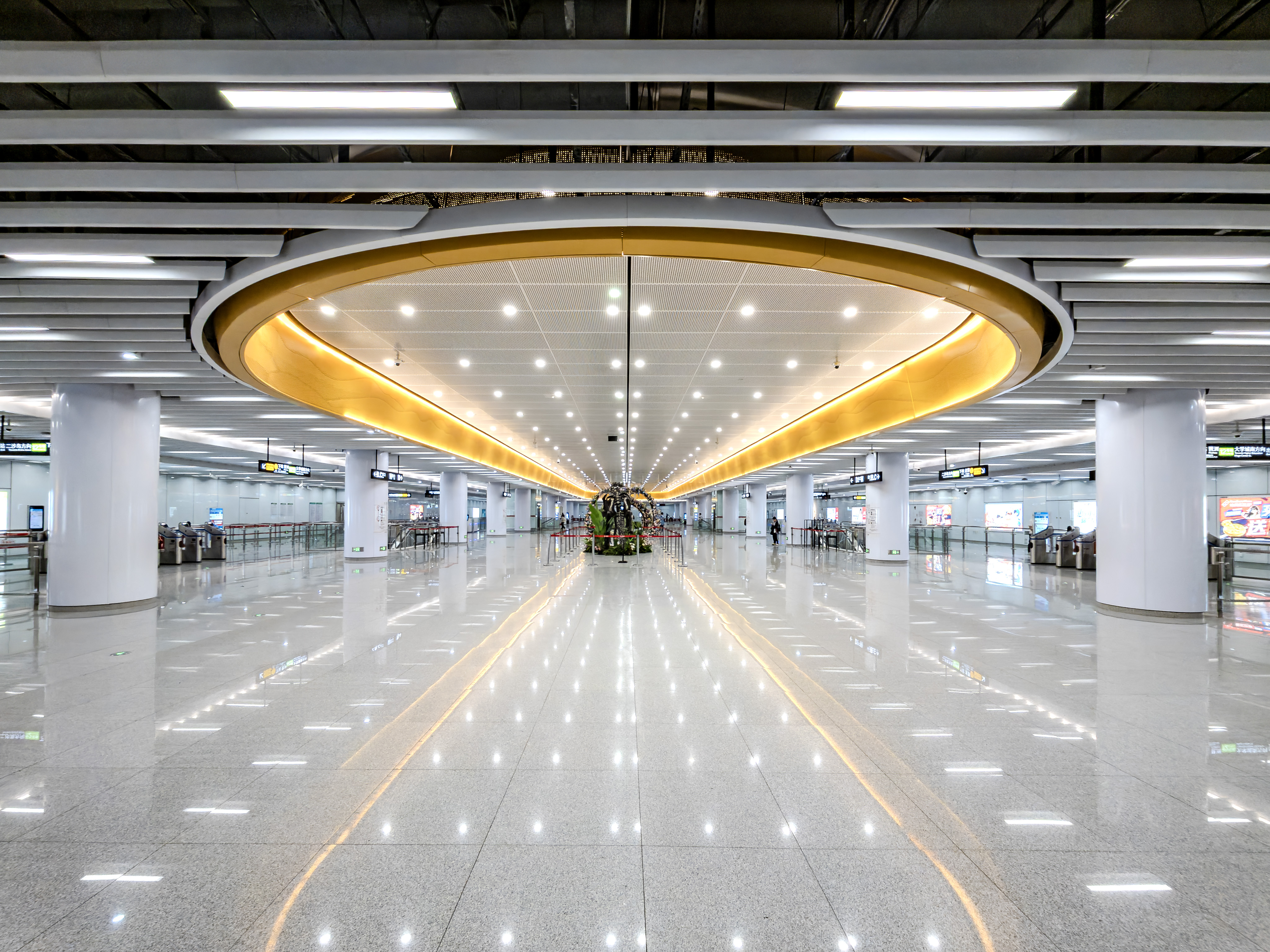
Concourse

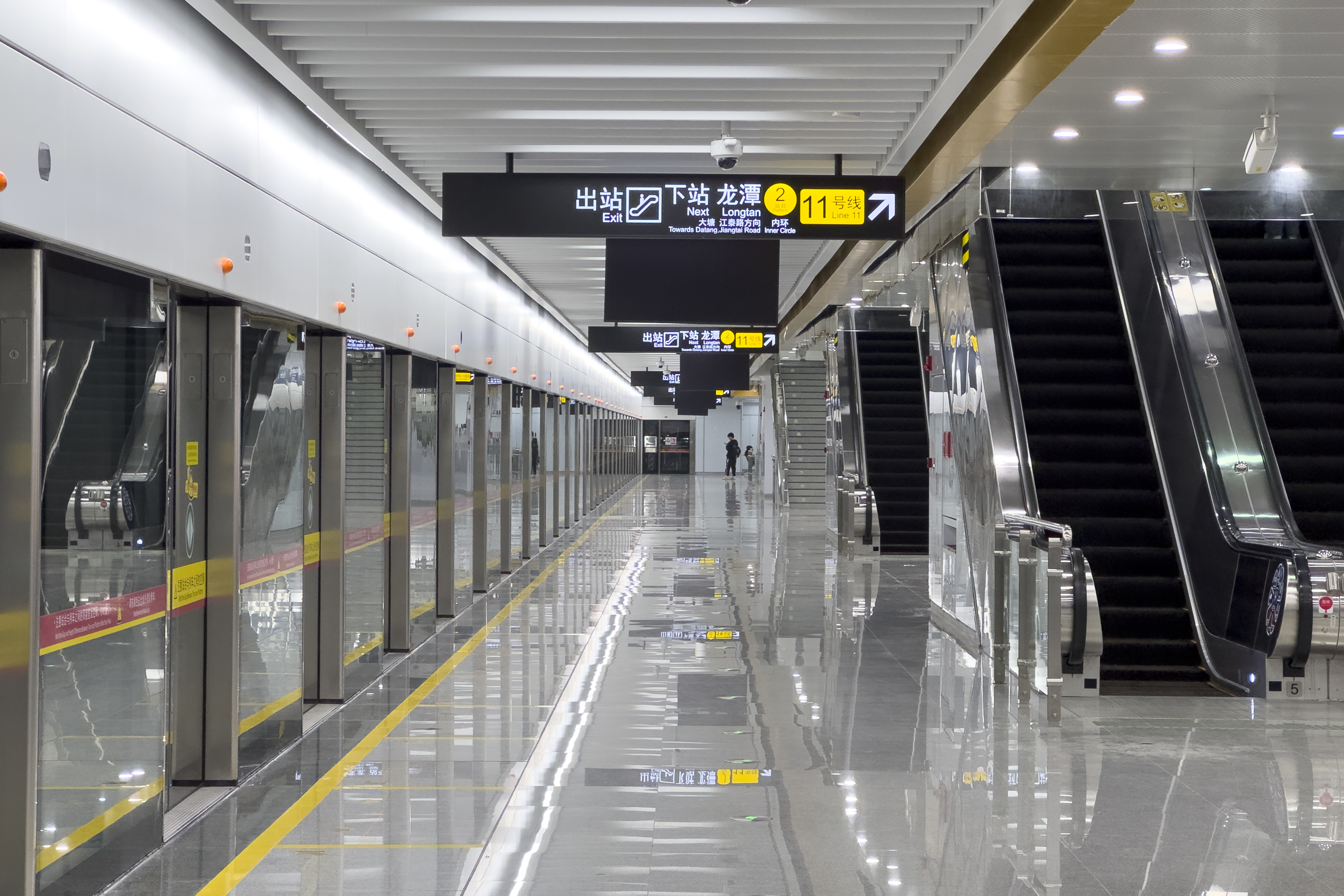
Reserved platform 3 for Line 12 when the station first opened

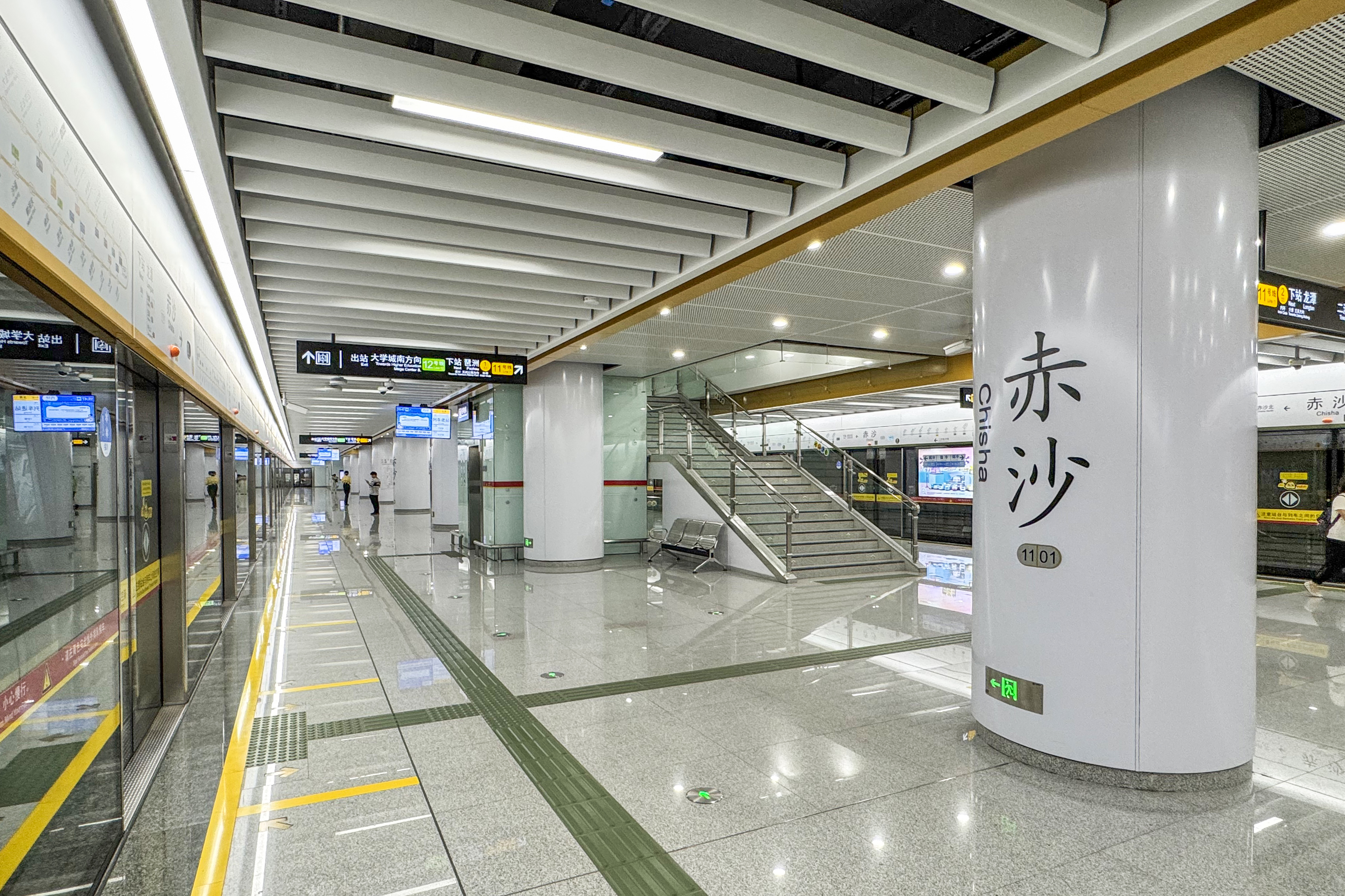
Platform 2 (Line 11 Inner Circle platform)

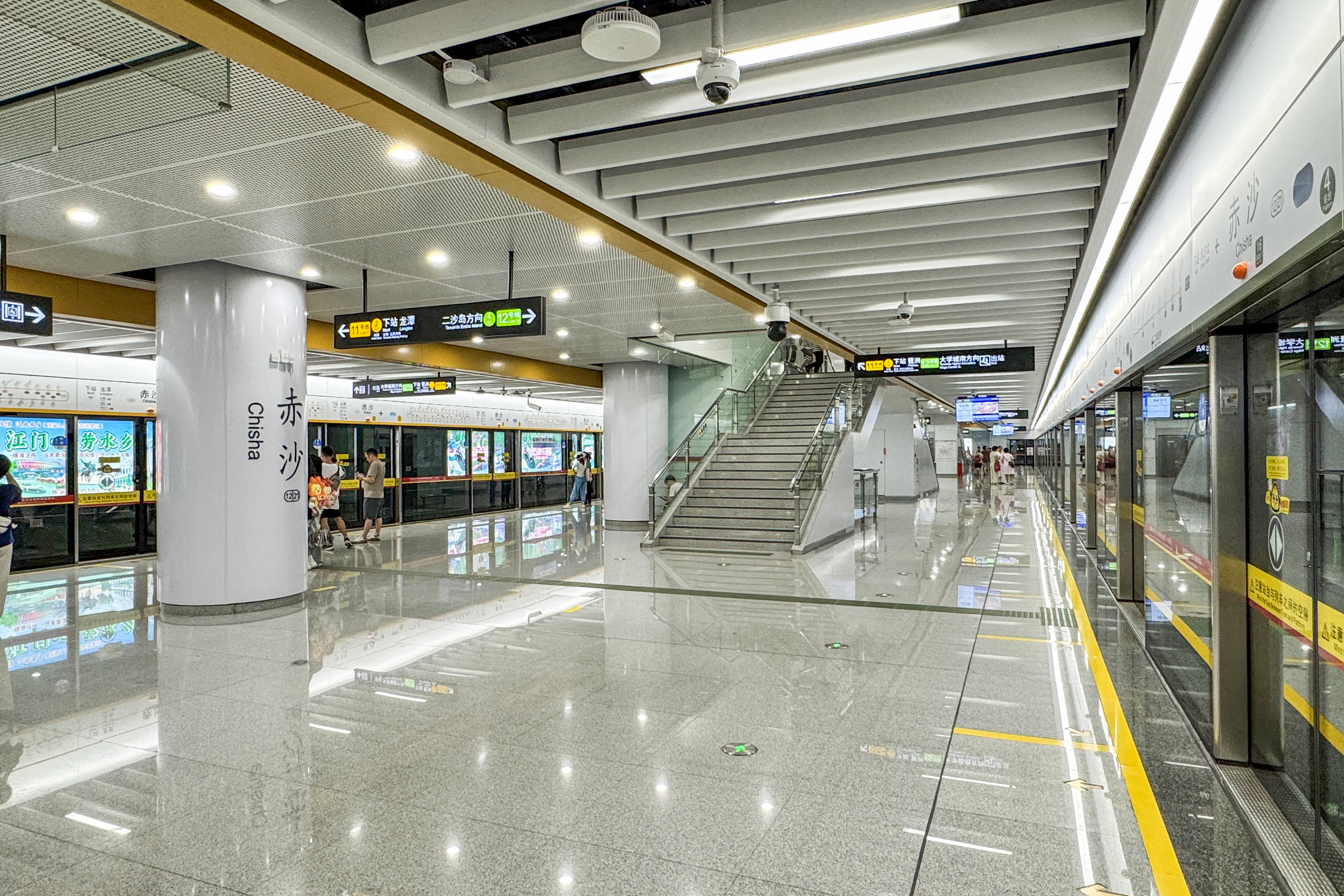
Platform 4 (Line 12 towards Ersha Island)

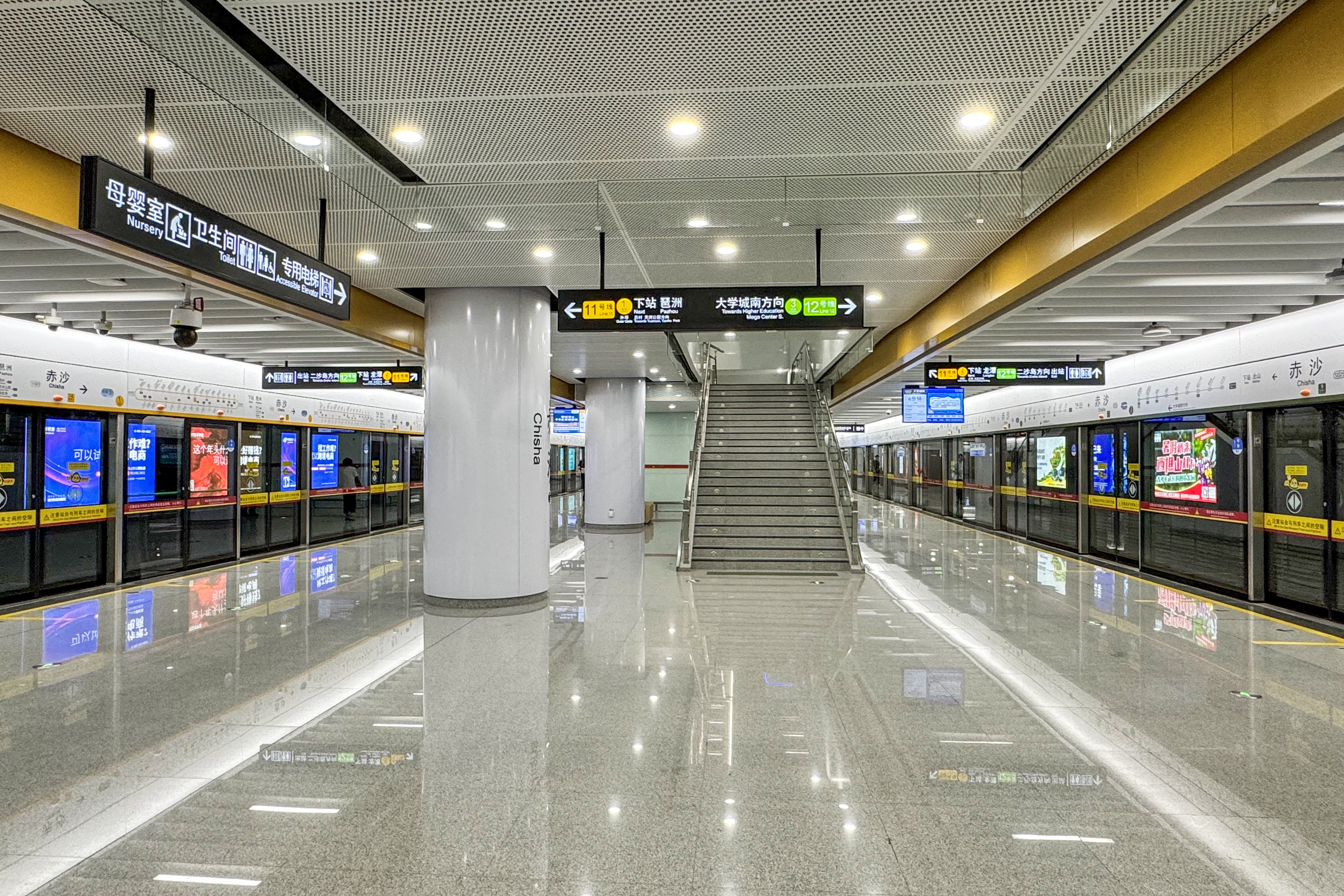
Southern platform (Platforms 1 and 3)
