= Chisha North station =

Guangzhou Metro Line 12 station

Chisha North 赤沙北
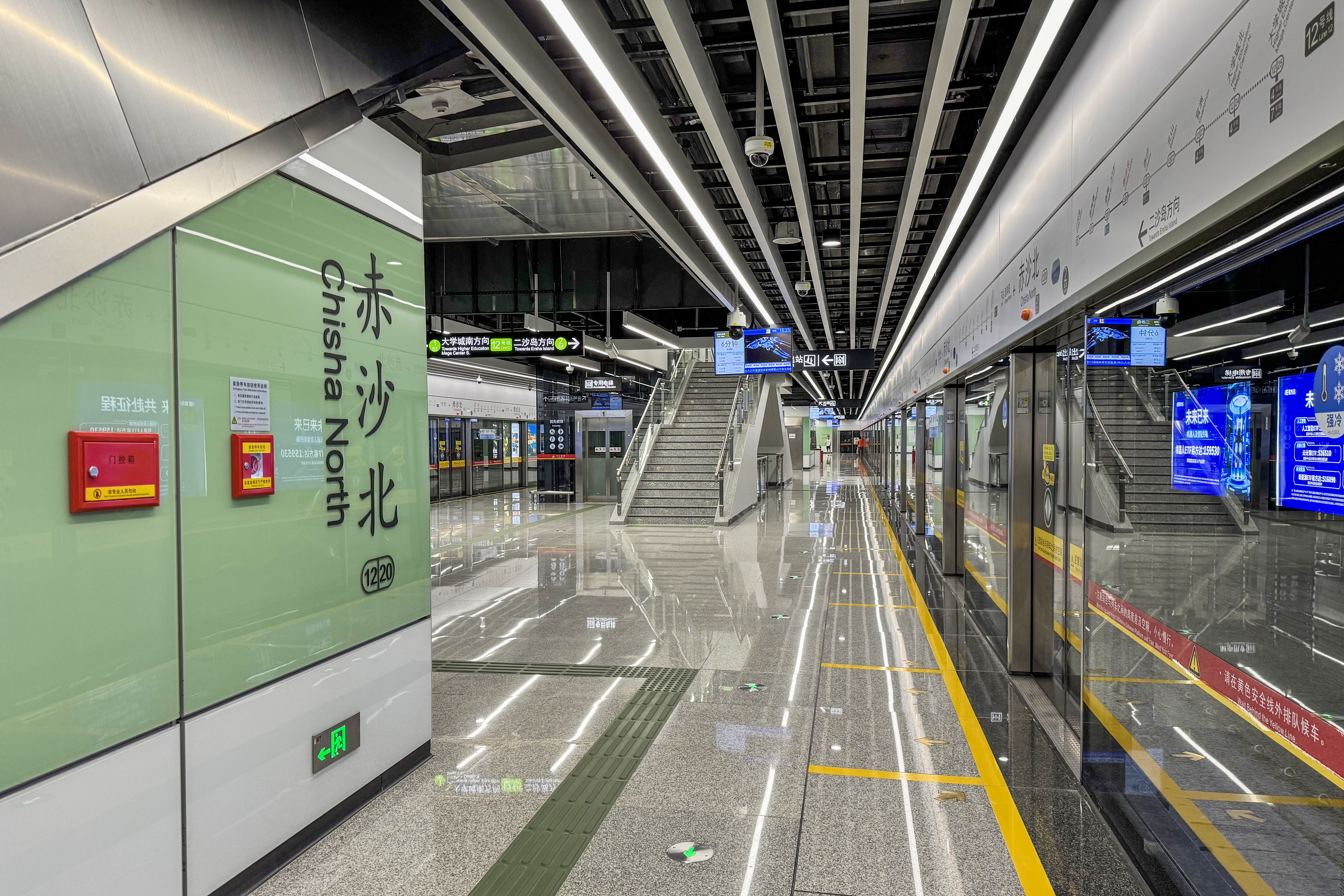
- Platform

Chinese name
- Chinese: 赤沙北站
Transcriptions
Standard Mandarin
- Hanyu Pinyin: Chìshā Běi Zhàn
Yue: Cantonese
- Yale Romanization: Cěksāa Bāk Jaahm
- Jyutping: Cek^{3}saa^{1} Bak^{1} Zaam^{6}

General information
- Location: Southwest side of Chisha Depot; Guanzhou Subdistrict, Haizhu District, Guangzhou, Guangdong; China
- Coordinates: 23°5′30.98″N 113°20′32.1″E
- Operator: Guangzhou Metro Co. Ltd.
- Line: Line 12
- Platforms: 2 (1 island platform)
- Tracks: 2

Construction
- Structure type: Underground
- Accessible: Yes

Other information
- Station code: 1220

History
- Opened: 29 June 2025 (13 months ago)

Services
Preceding station	Guangzhou Metro	Following station
Chigang towards Ersha Island	Line 12 East section	Chisha towards Higher Education Mega Center South
Location

Chisha North station (Chinese: 赤沙北站; Jyutping: cek^{3} saa^{1} bak^{1} zaam^{6}; Cantonese Yale: Cěksāa Bāk Jaahm) is a station on Line 12 of the Guangzhou Metro. It is located underground on the southeast side of Line 11's Chisha Depot in Guangzhou's Haizhu District. It opened on 29 June 2025.

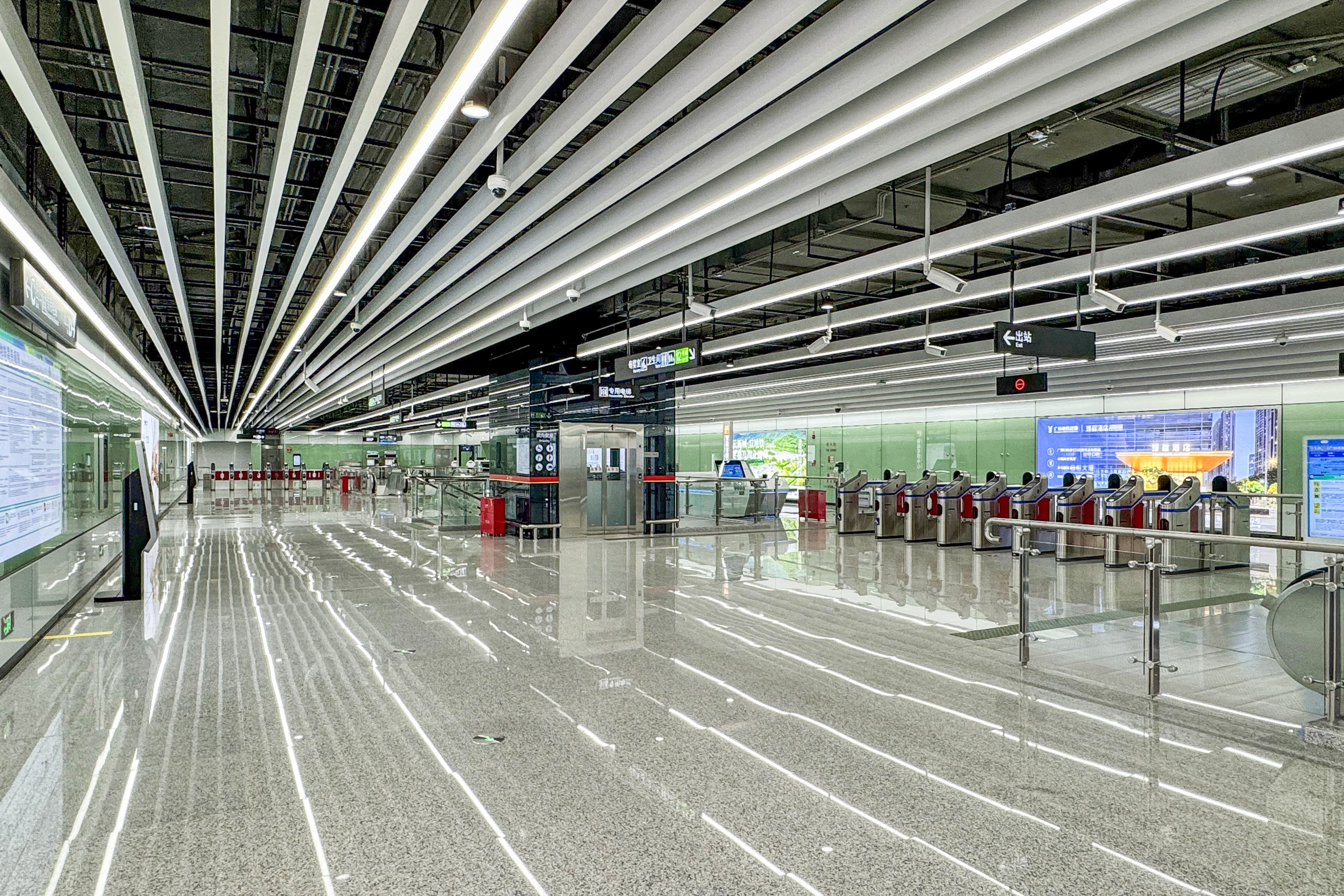
Concourse

== Station layout ==
This station is a two-storey underground station. The ground level is the exit, and it is surrounded by the Chisha Depot of Line 11, the over-station development (Pazhou South TOD) and other nearby buildings. The first floor is the concourse, and the second floor is the platform for Line 12.

G		Exits C and D
L1	Concourse	Tickets, Customer Service Center, Shops, Police Station, Security Facilities
L2; Platforms	Platform 2	12 towards Ersha Island (Chigang)
L2; Platforms	Island platform, doors will open on the left (Toilets, Nursery)
L2; Platforms	Platform 1	12 towards Higher Education Mega Center South (Chisha)

=== Concourse ===
There are automatic ticket machines and a smart customer service center at the concourse. There are elevators, escalators, and stairs in the fare-paid area for passengers to reach the platform.

=== Platform ===
The station has an island platform located underground on the southwest side of Chisha Depot. Toilets and a nursery room are located at the end of the platform towards Higher Education Mega Center South.

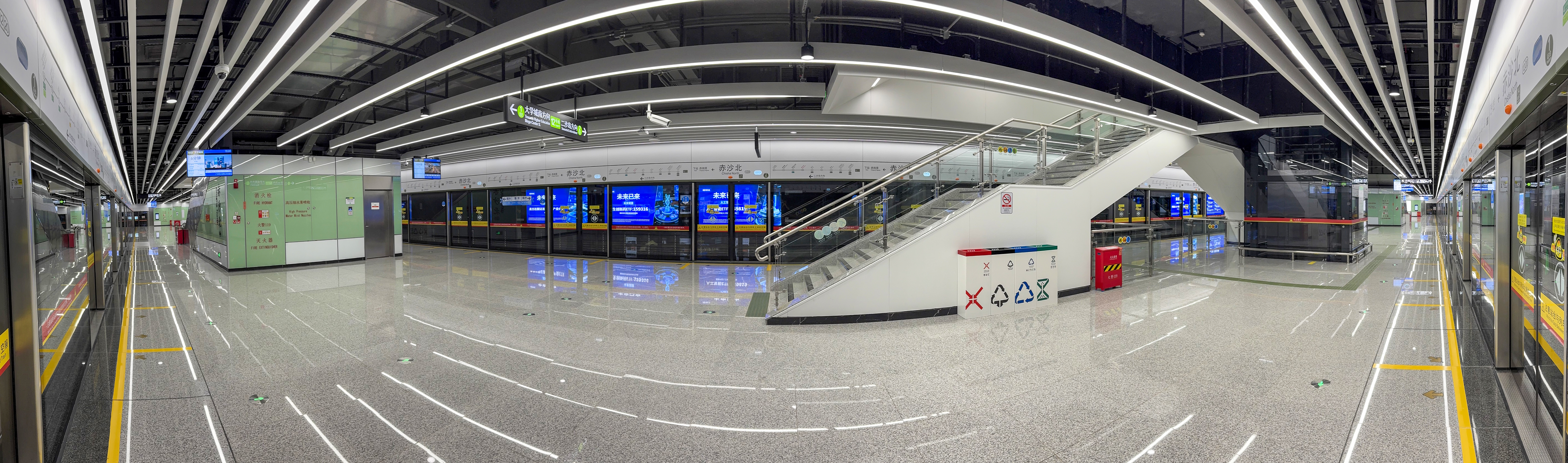
Platform panorama

=== Entrances/exits ===
The station has 2 points of entry/exit. Exit C is equipped with an elevator.

- C: Huizhan Avenue
- D: Huizhan Avenue
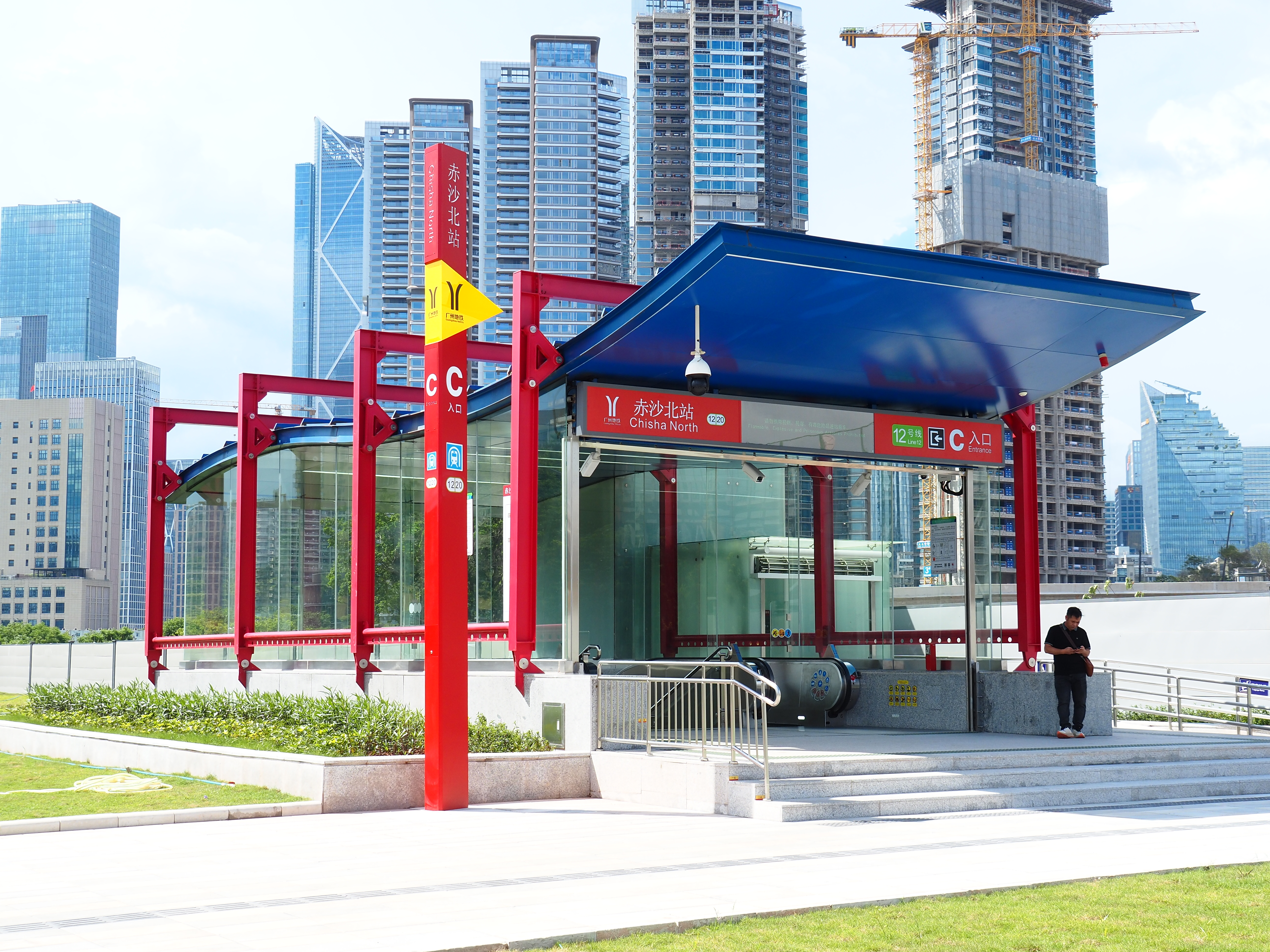
Entrance C

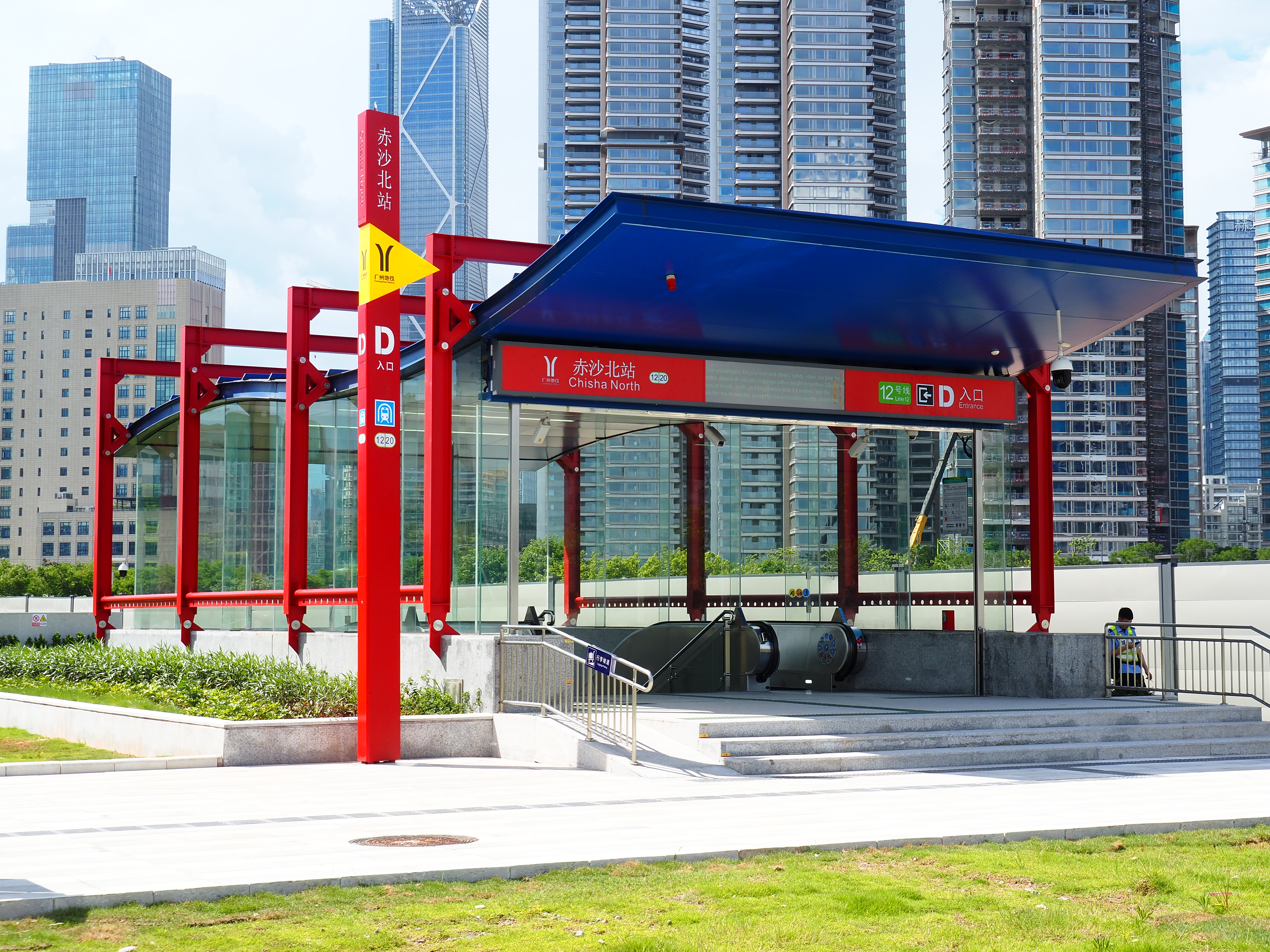
Entrance D

== History ==
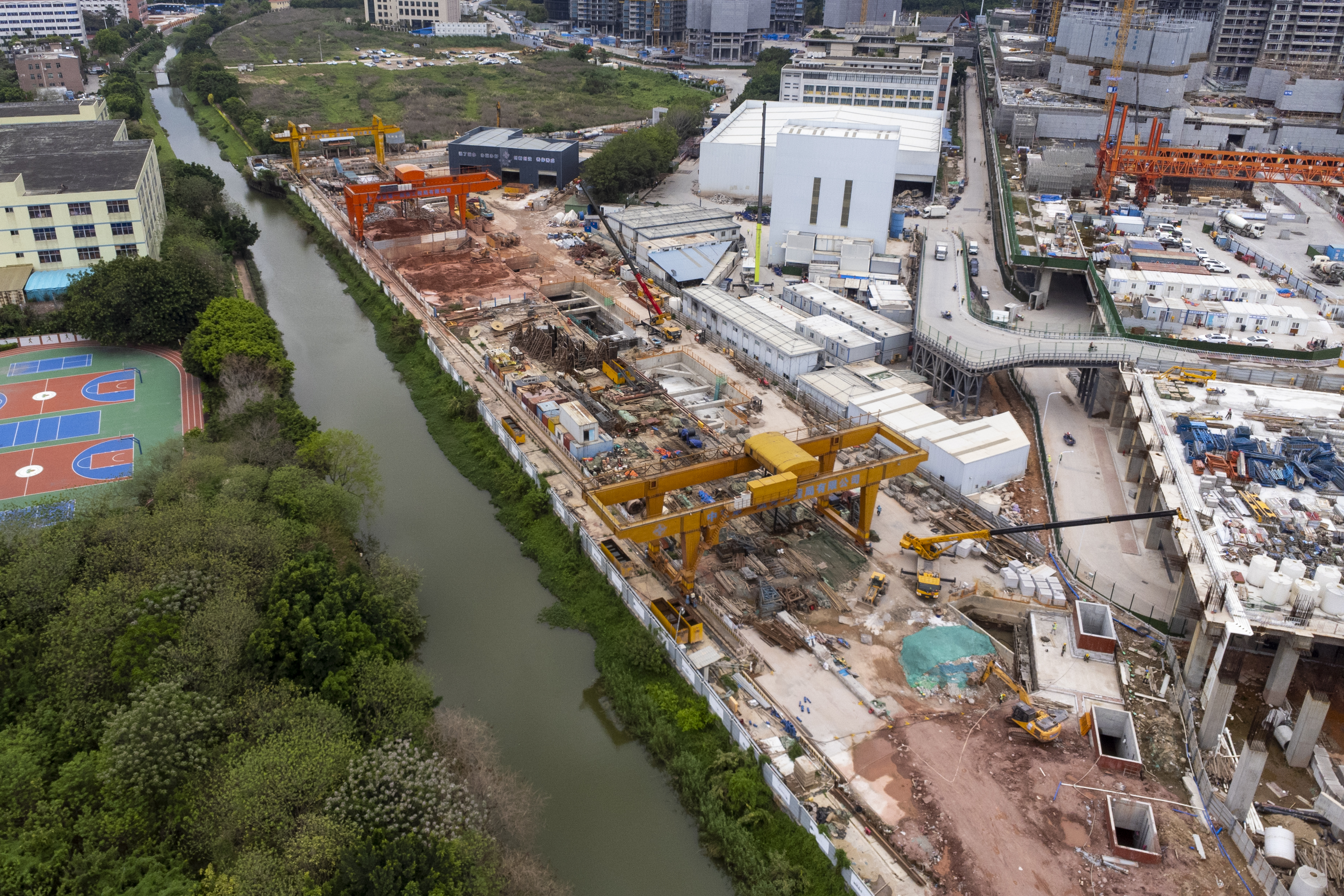
Construction site (April 2024)

Construction of the station began in December 2019. Construction of the underground diaphragm wall was completed on 30 May 2020, and the roof slab was sealed on 18 May 2021. In December 2024, the station completed the "three rights" transfer.

Because the station is adjacent to the Chisha Depot and is used as a supporting station for the properties above it, the station name during planning was Chisha station. In June 2023, Guangzhou Metro Group announced the preliminary names of the stations of Line 11, and the name, Chisha station, will be used by the transfer station of Line 11 and Line 12 adjacent to the station. In August 2024, the initial names of the eastern section of Line 12 stations were announced, and the station was renamed Chisha North station. Since the station is actually located in the northwest of Chisha Village, and the northern part of Chisha Village is served by Xingangdong station, it is alleged to be misleading. A month later, the Civil Affairs Bureau issued a statement for soliciting opinions, believing that the deviation of the name and designation of the public's suggestions was likely to cause confusion and mislead the public. In April of the following year, the official station name of the eastern section of Line 12 was announced, and the station kept the name of Chisha North station.

On 29 June 2025, the station opened.
