= Longtan station =

Guangzhou Metro station in China

Longtan 龙潭
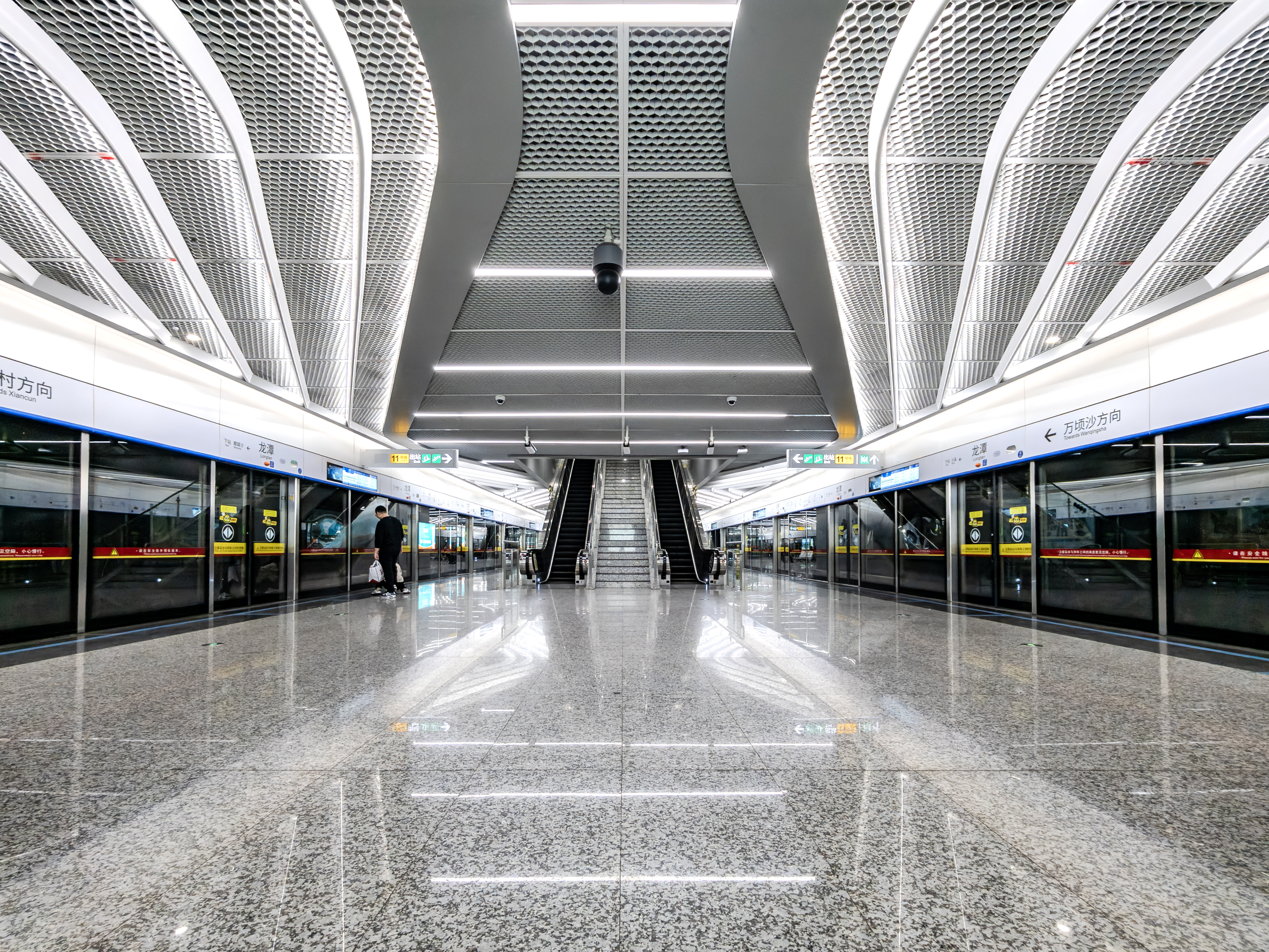
- Line 18 platform

Chinese name
- Simplified Chinese: 龙潭站
- Traditional Chinese: 龍潭站
Transcriptions
Standard Mandarin
- Hanyu Pinyin: Lóngtán Zhàn
Yue: Cantonese
- Yale Romanization: Lùhngtàahm Jaahm
- Jyutping: Lung^{4}taam^{4} Zaam^{6}

General information
- Location: Between Xinjiao Road Middle (新滘中路) and Taichong (台涌), Huazhou Subdistrict; Haizhu District, Guangzhou, Guangdong; China
- Coordinates: 23°4′58.5098″N 113°20′8.3602″E
- Operator: Guangzhou Metro Co. Ltd.
- Lines: Line 11; Line 18
- Platforms: 4 (2 island platforms)
- Tracks: 6

Construction
- Structure type: Underground
- Accessible: Yes

Other information
- Station code: 1131 1806

History
- Opened: Line 18: 28 September 2021 (4 years ago); Line 11: 28 December 2024 (19 months ago)
- Former names: Shiliugang (石榴岗), Haizhu Wetland (海珠湿地)

Services
Preceding station	Guangzhou Metro	Following station
Chisha Outer Circle	Line 11	Datang Inner Circle
Modiesha towards Xiancun	Line 18	Shaxi towards Wanqingsha
Location

Longtan station (simplified Chinese: 龙潭站; traditional Chinese: 龍潭站; pinyin: Lóngtán Zhàn; Cantonese Yale: Lùhngtàahm Jaahm) is an interchange station between Line 11 and Line 18 of the Guangzhou Metro, located underground between Xinjiao Middle Road and Taichong in Guangzhou's Haizhu District. It opened on 28 September 2021. Line 11 started operations at this station on 28 December 2024.

The rails for Line 11 at this station connects to the nearby Chisha Depot. Thus, this is the terminating station for Outer Circle Line 11 trains returning to the depot.

== Station layout ==
G	Street level	Exits A-G
L1; Concourse	Lobby	Ticket Machines, Customer Service, Shops, Police Station, Security Facilities
L2; 11 Platforms	Buffer Level	Station Equipment
L2; 11 Platforms	Platform 2	11 Inner Circle (Datang)
L2; 11 Platforms	Island platform, doors will open on the left (Toilets, Nursery)
L2; 11 Platforms	Platform 1	11 Outer Circle (Chisha)
Mezzanine	Transfer Passageway	Transfer passageway between Lines 11 & 18
L3; 18 Platforms	Bypass Track	18 express service passing loop
L3; 18 Platforms	Platform 3	18 towards Xiancun (Modiesha)
L3; 18 Platforms	Island platform, doors will open on the left (Toilets, Nursery)
L3; 18 Platforms	Platform 4	18 towards Wanqingsha (Shaxi)
L3; 18 Platforms	Bypass Track	18 express service passing loop

=== Entrances/exits ===
The station has 7 points of entry/exit. Exits B, C and D opened with the station's initial opening. When Line 11 opened, Exits A, E, F and G opened. Exits B, F and G are equipped with elevators.

- A: Shiliugang Road
- B: Xinjiao Road Middle
- C: Shiliugang Road, Southern Medical University Hospital of Integrated Traditional Chinese and Western Medicine
- D: Xinjiao Road Middle
- E: Xinjiao Road Middle
- F: Xinjiao Road Middle
- G: Xinjiao Road Middle, Guangzhou Haizhu National Wetland Park
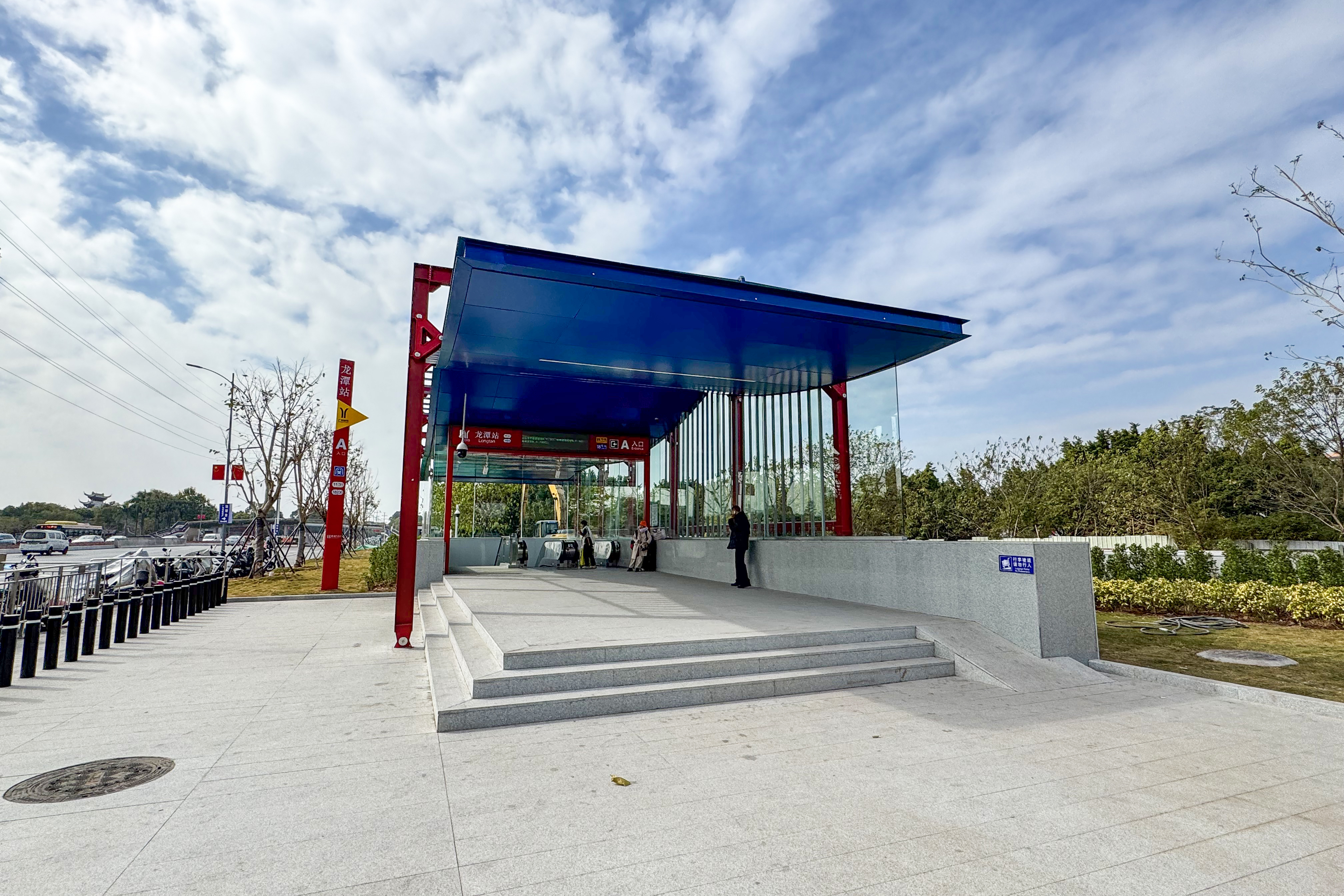
Entrance A

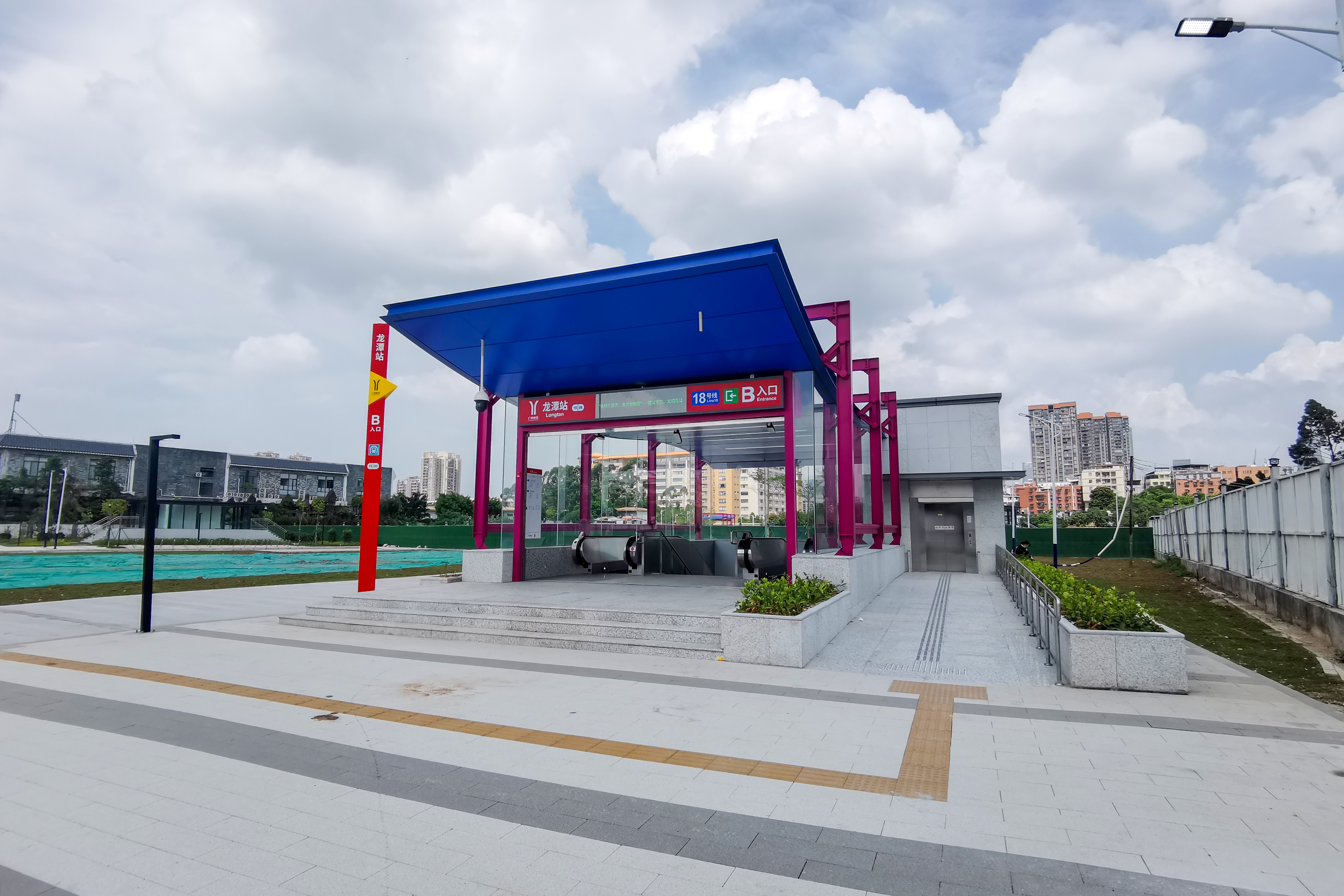
Entrance B

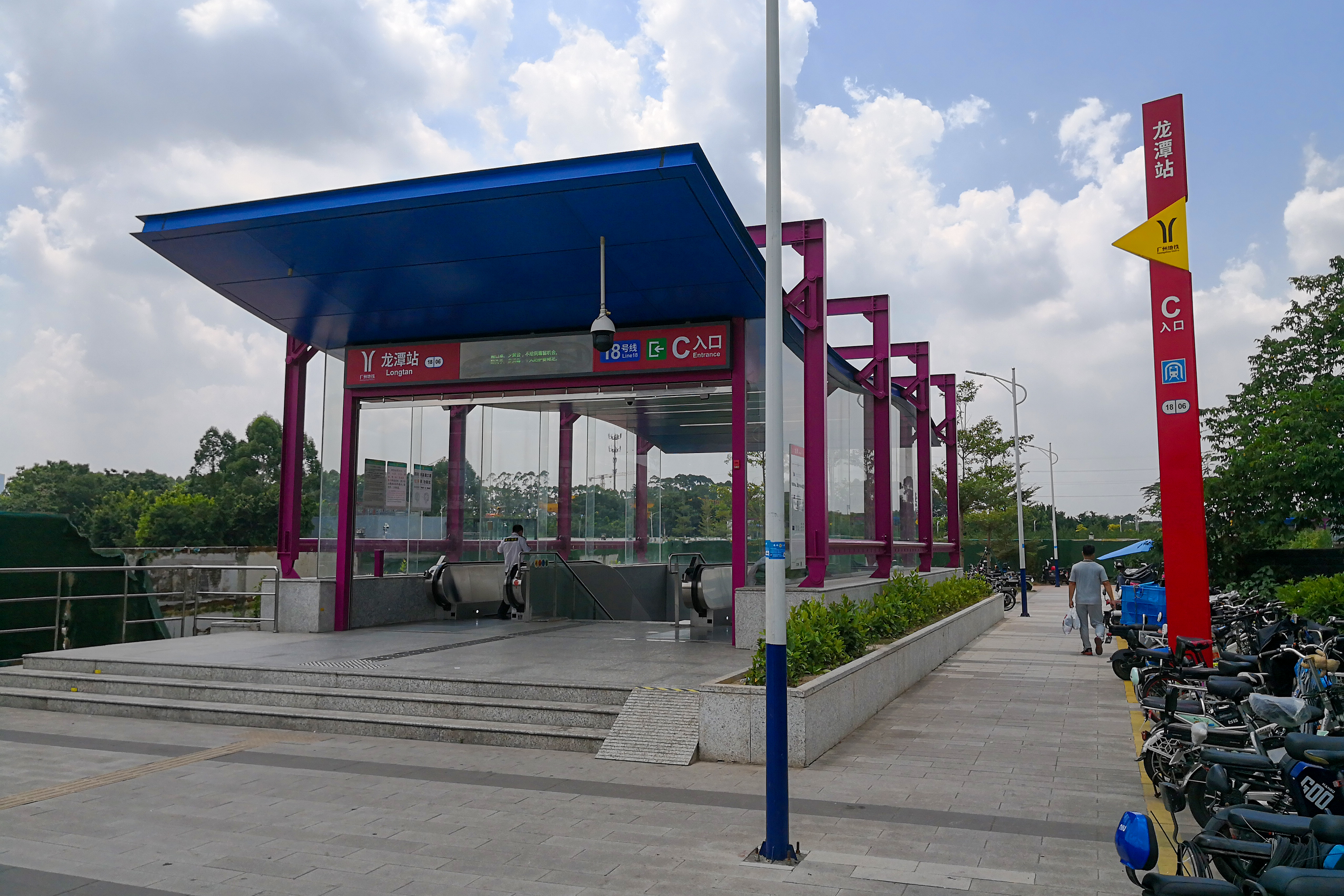
Entrance C

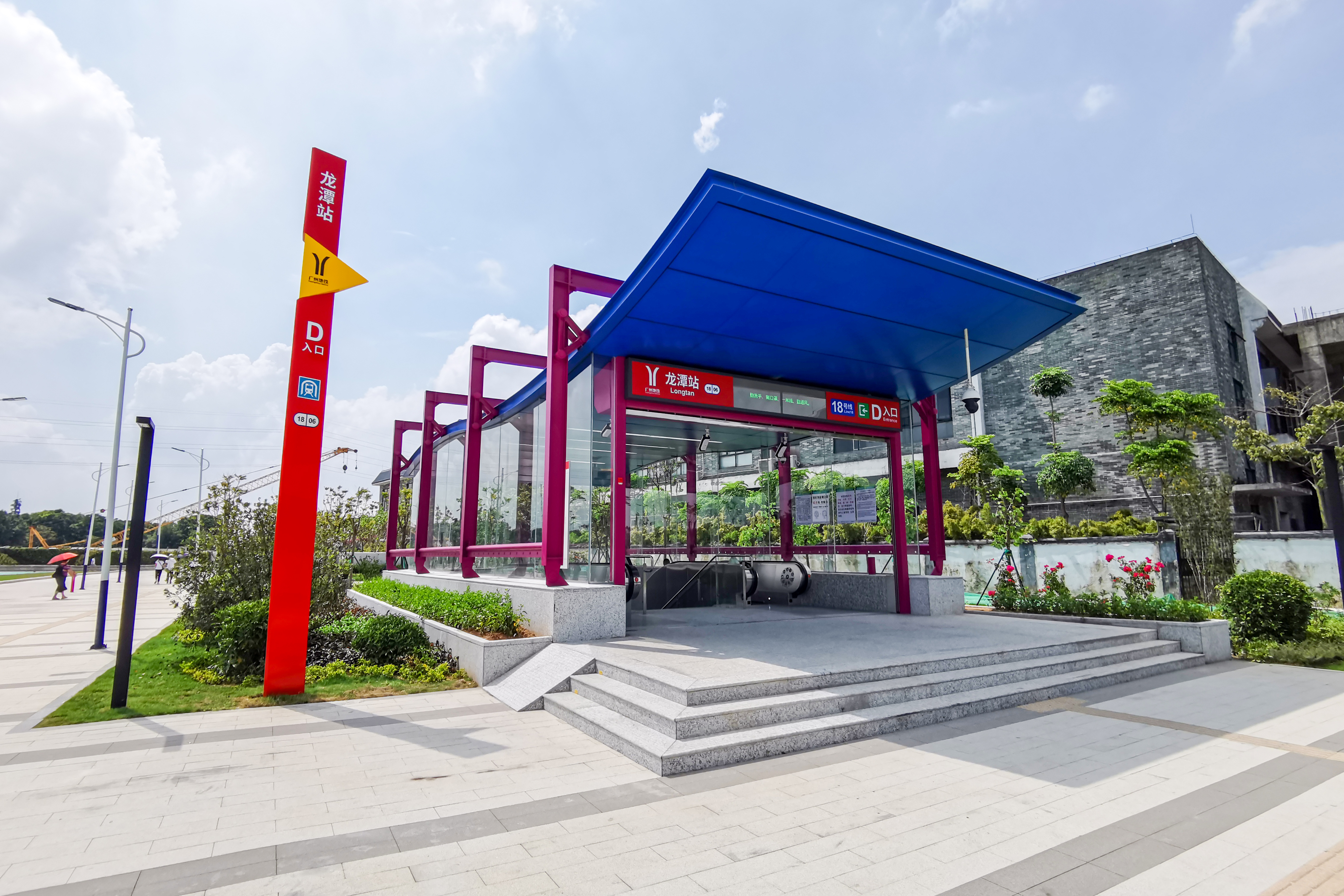
Entrance D

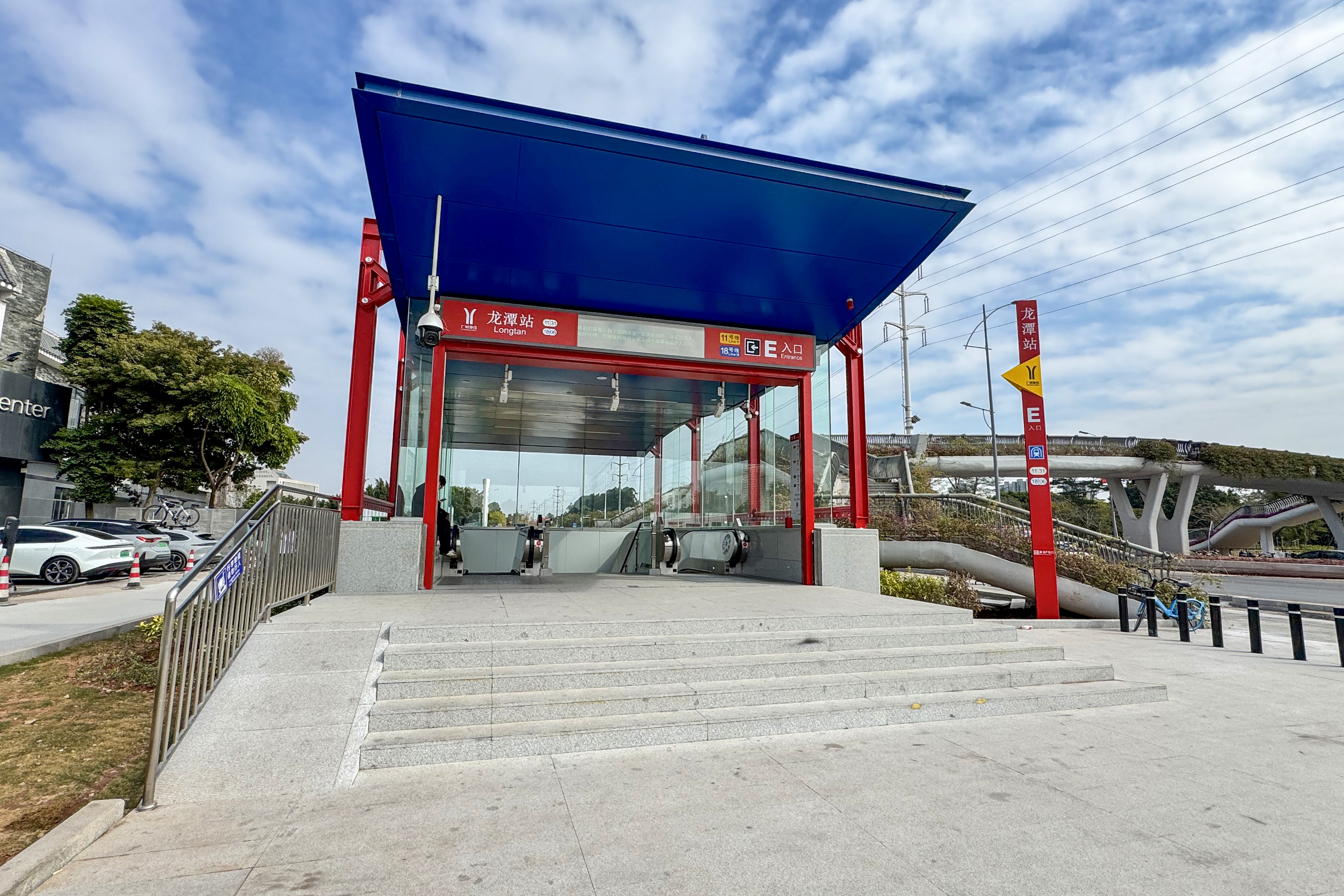
Entrance E

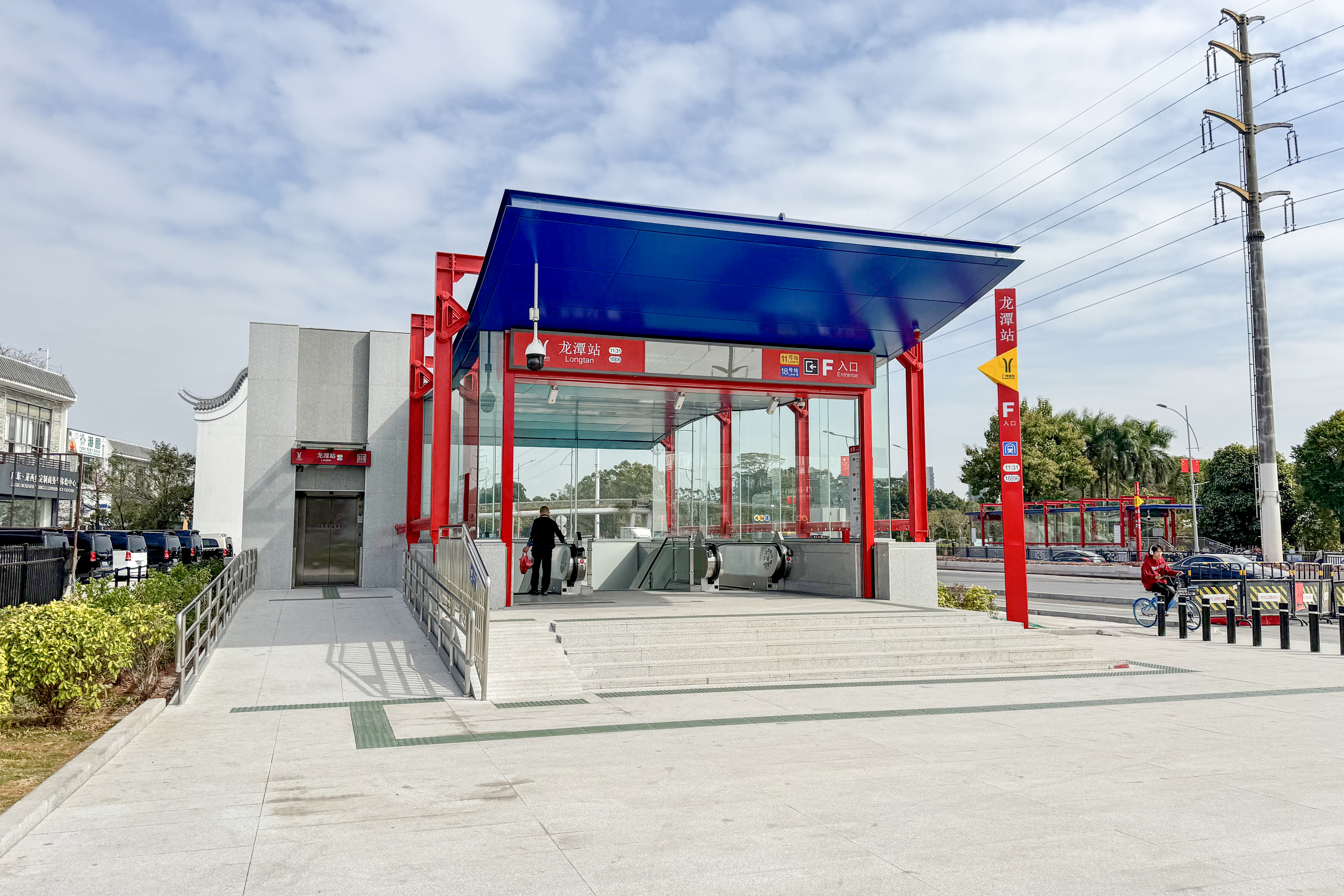
Entrance F

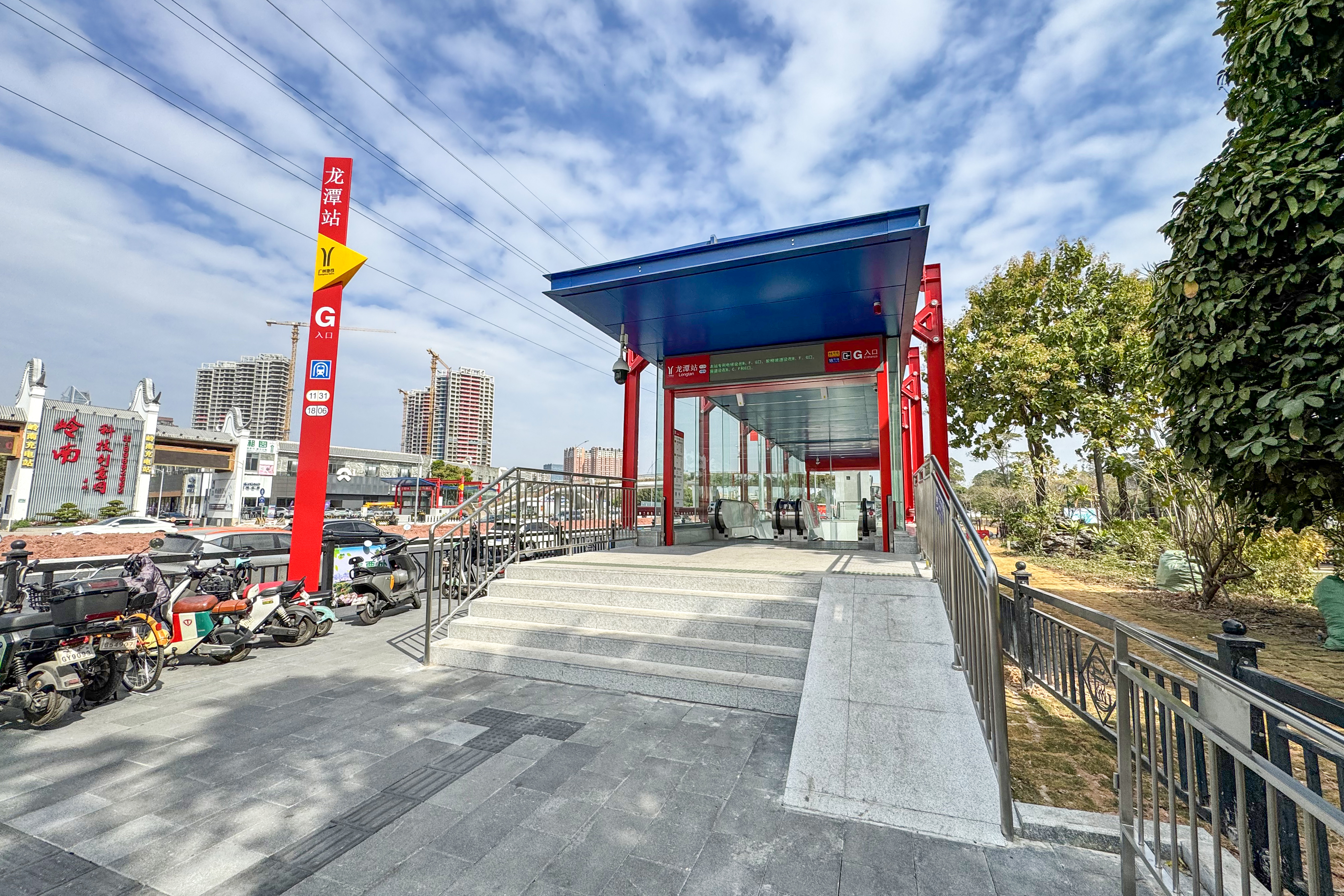
Escalator of Entrance G

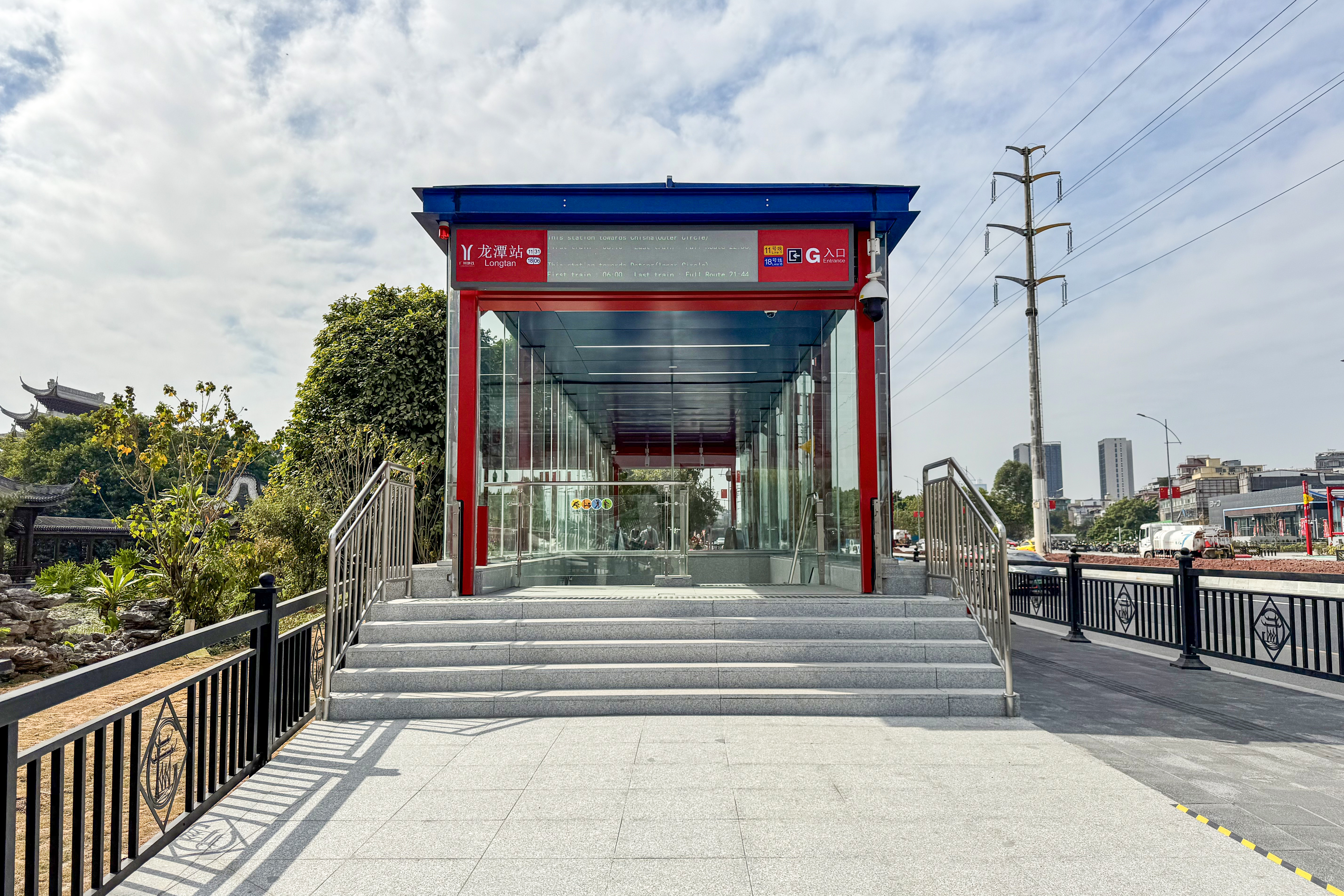
Stairs of Entrance G

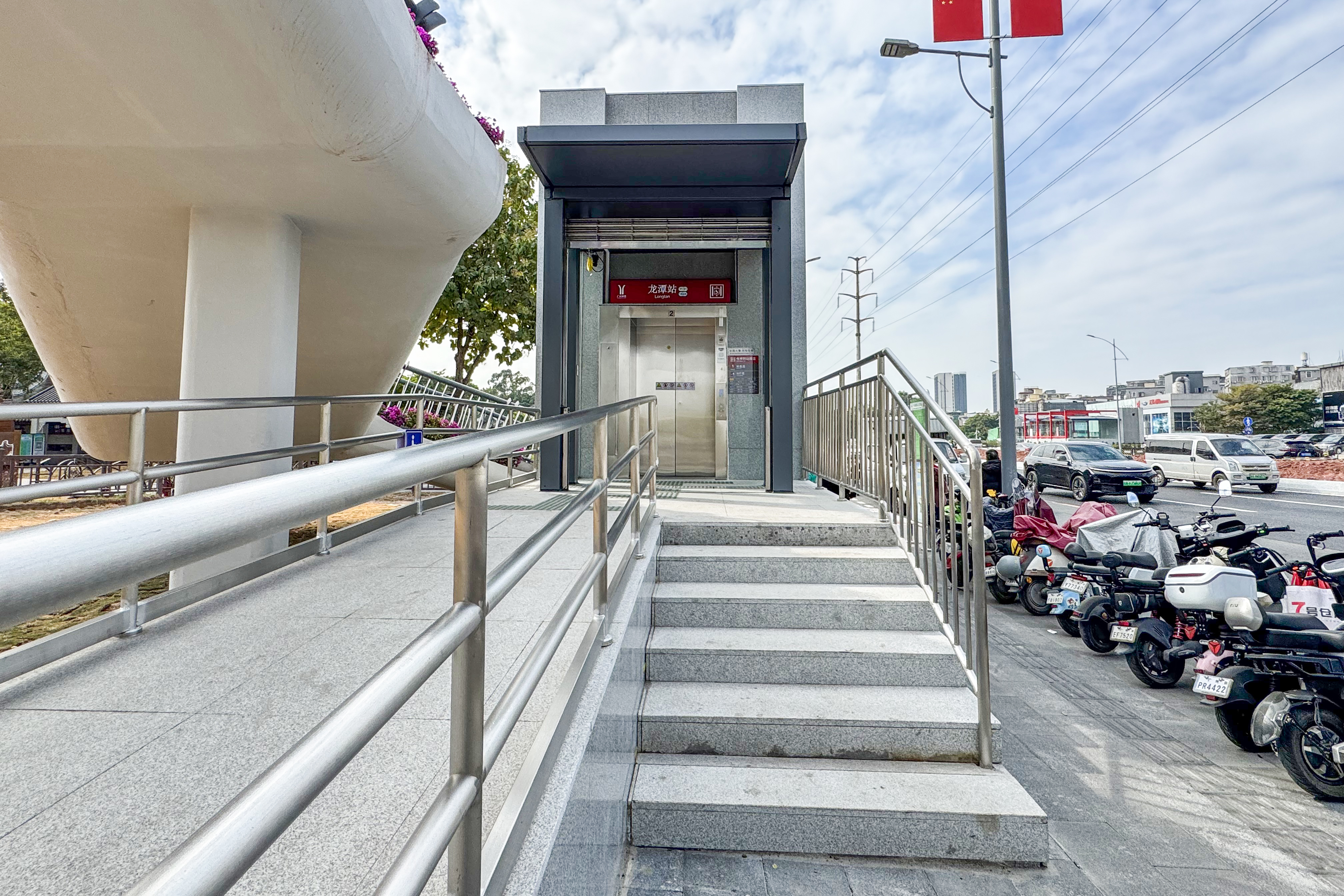
Elevator of Entrance G

== Gallery ==
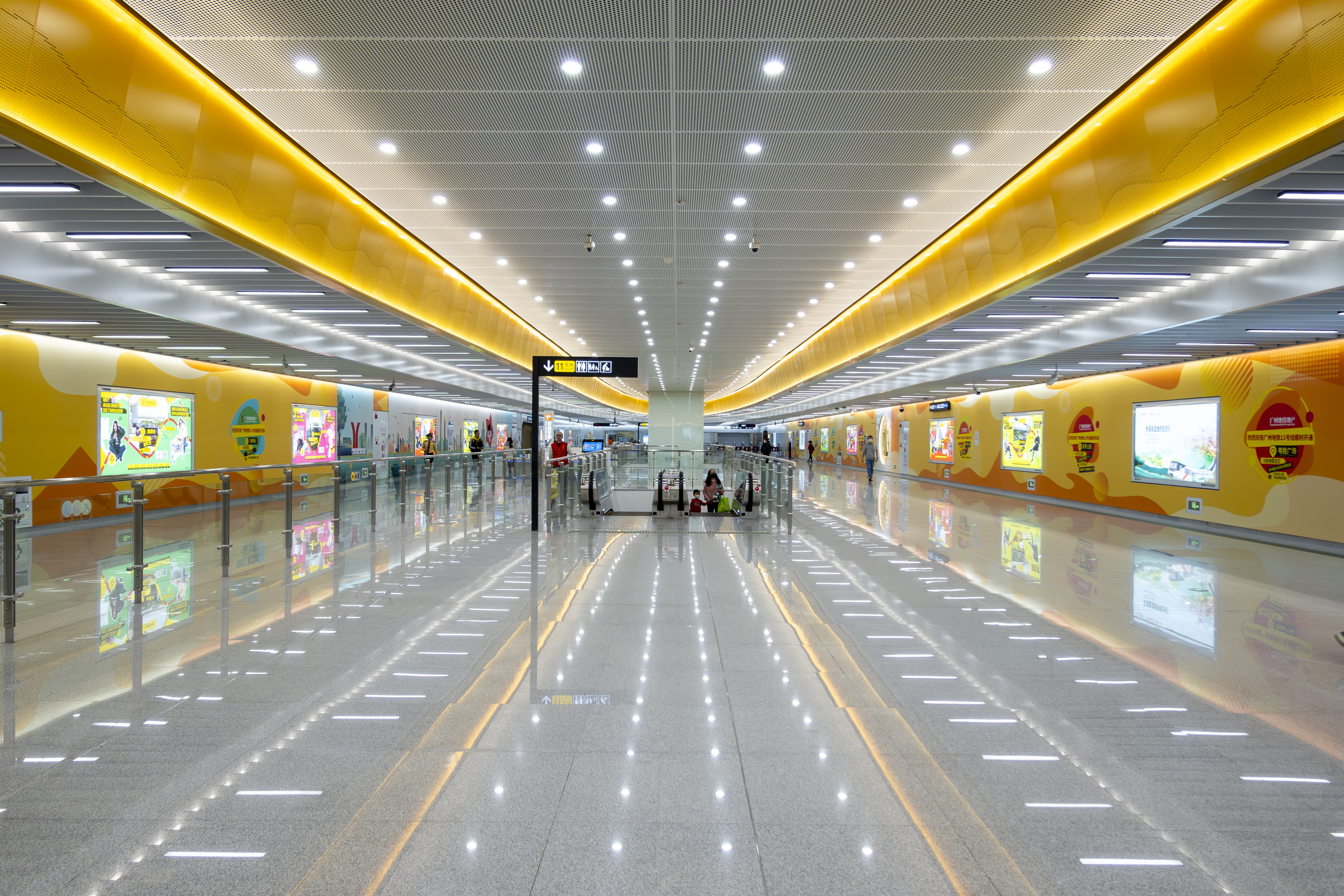
Line 11 Concourse

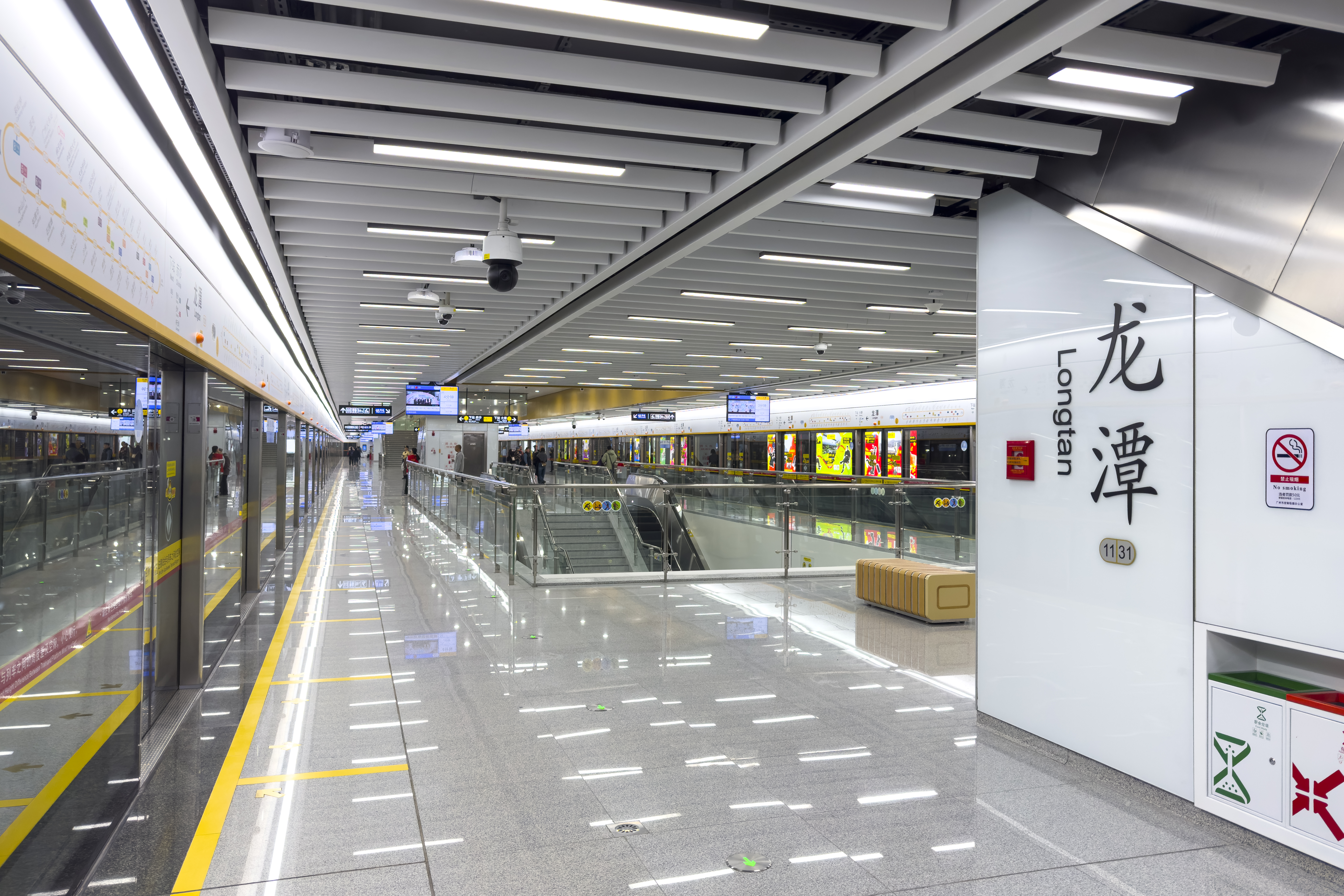
Line 11 Platform 1

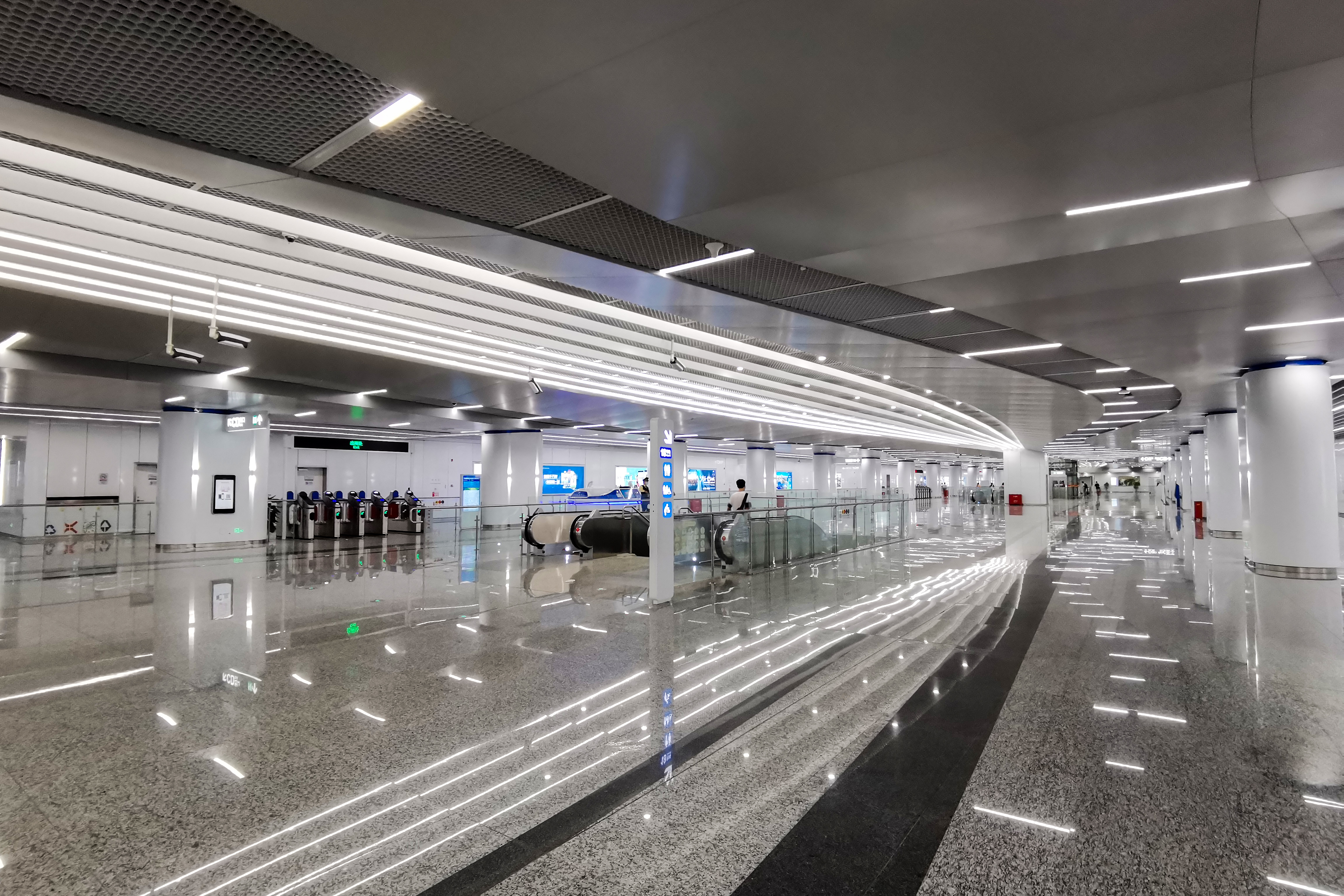
Line 18 Concourse

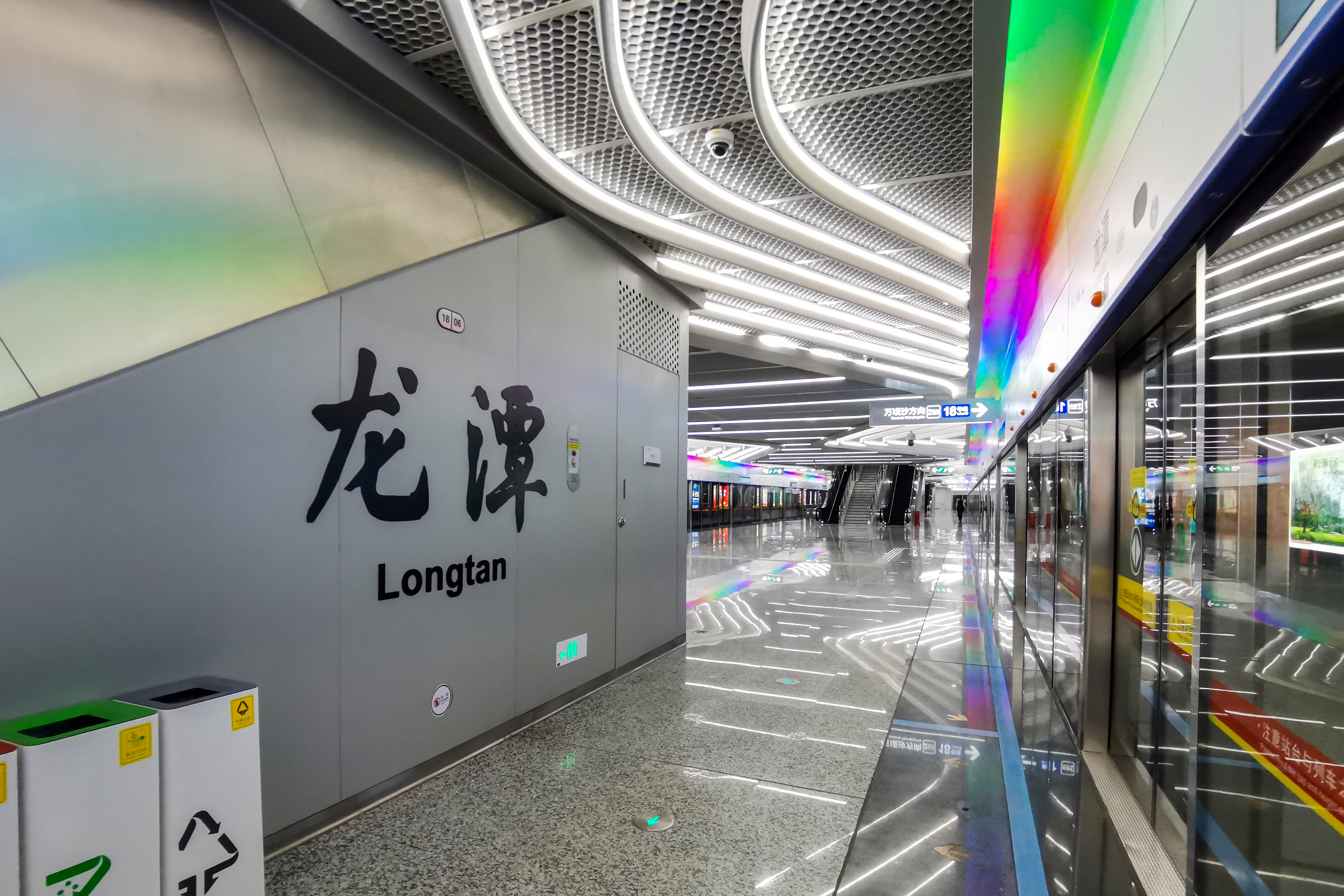
Line 18 Platform calligraphy

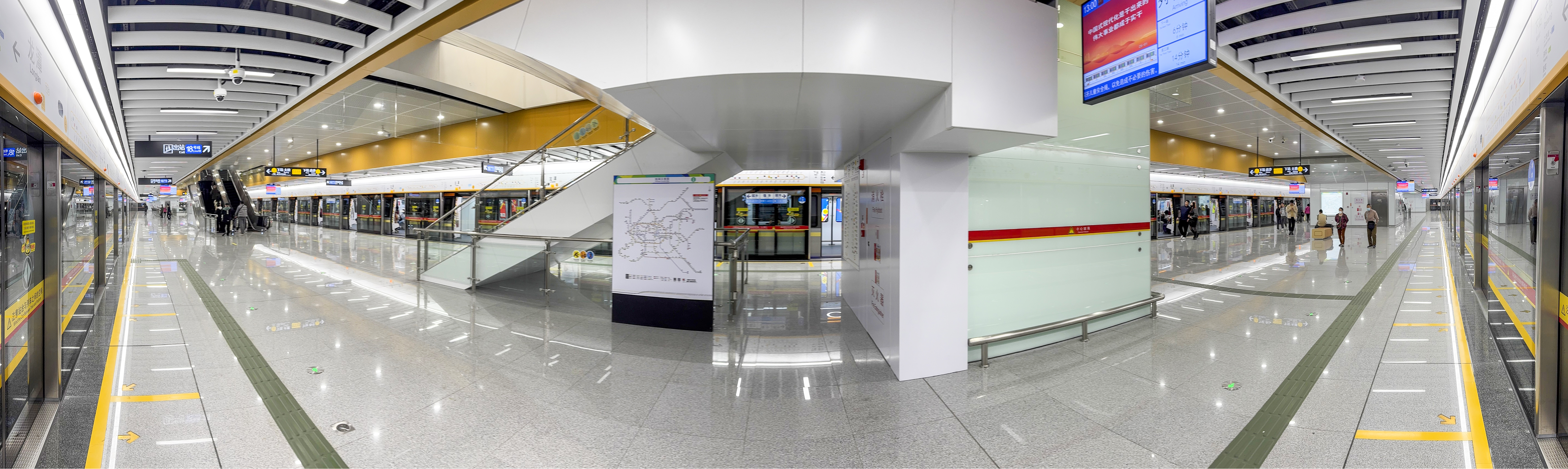
Line 11 Platform Panorama

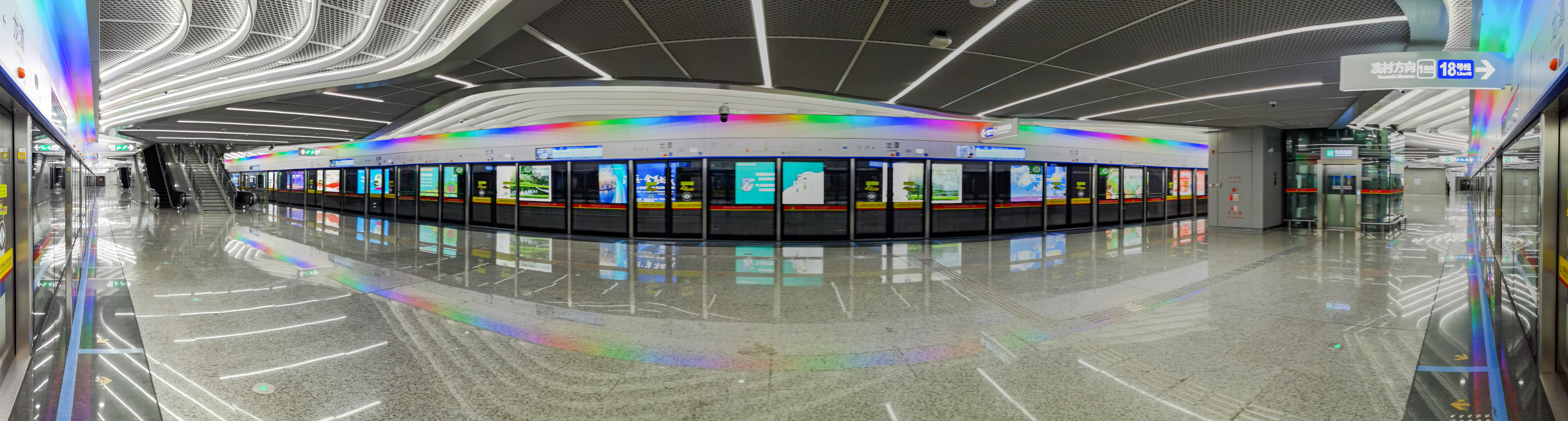
Line 18 Platform Panorama

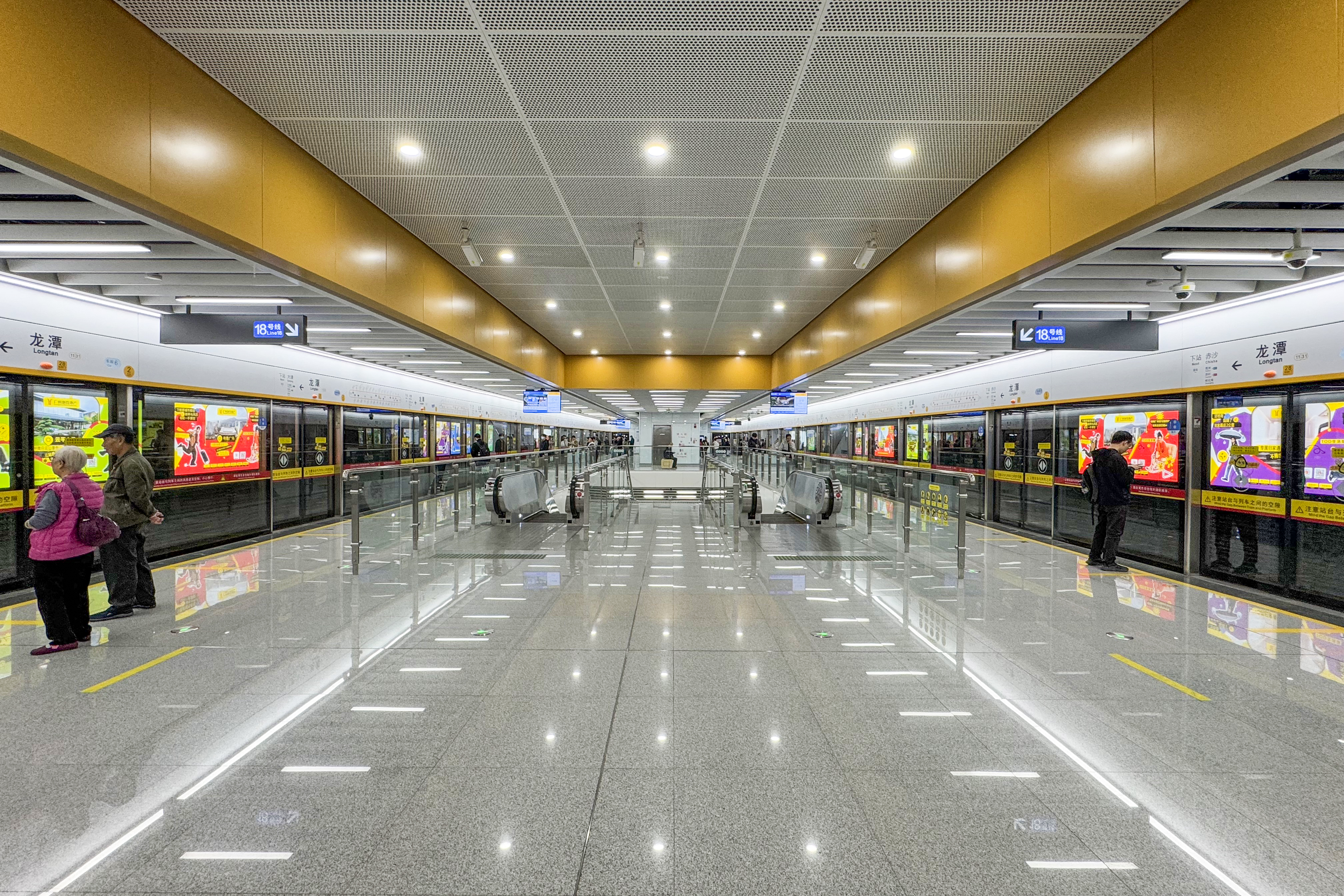
Line 11 transfer node towards Line 18

== History ==
During the EIA announcement of Line 11, the proximity of the station to the Haizhu Wetland Park and the fact that two entrances and exits entered the planned land area of the wetland park caused concern among citizens and environmental groups. In order to protect the environment of the wetland park, Line 11 cancelled the subway entrance on the sidewalk at the entrance of the wetland park in the follow-up plan.

During planning, the station was called Shiliugang station. In June 2020, the Guangzhou Civil Affairs Bureau announced that the station was initially named Haizhu Wetland station. In February 2021, the station name was finally decided to be Longtan station.

On 28 September 2021, the Line 18 station opened.

During COVID-19 pandemic control rules at the end of 2022, due to the impact of prevention and control measures, station service was suspended from 20:00 on 30 October 2022 to the afternoon of 30 November 2022.

On 30 July 2024, the Line 11 station completed the "three rights" transfer. On 28 December, the station was opened with the opening of Line 11, and the station became an interchange station.
