= Shangchong station =

Guangzhou Metro Line 11 station

Shangchong 上涌
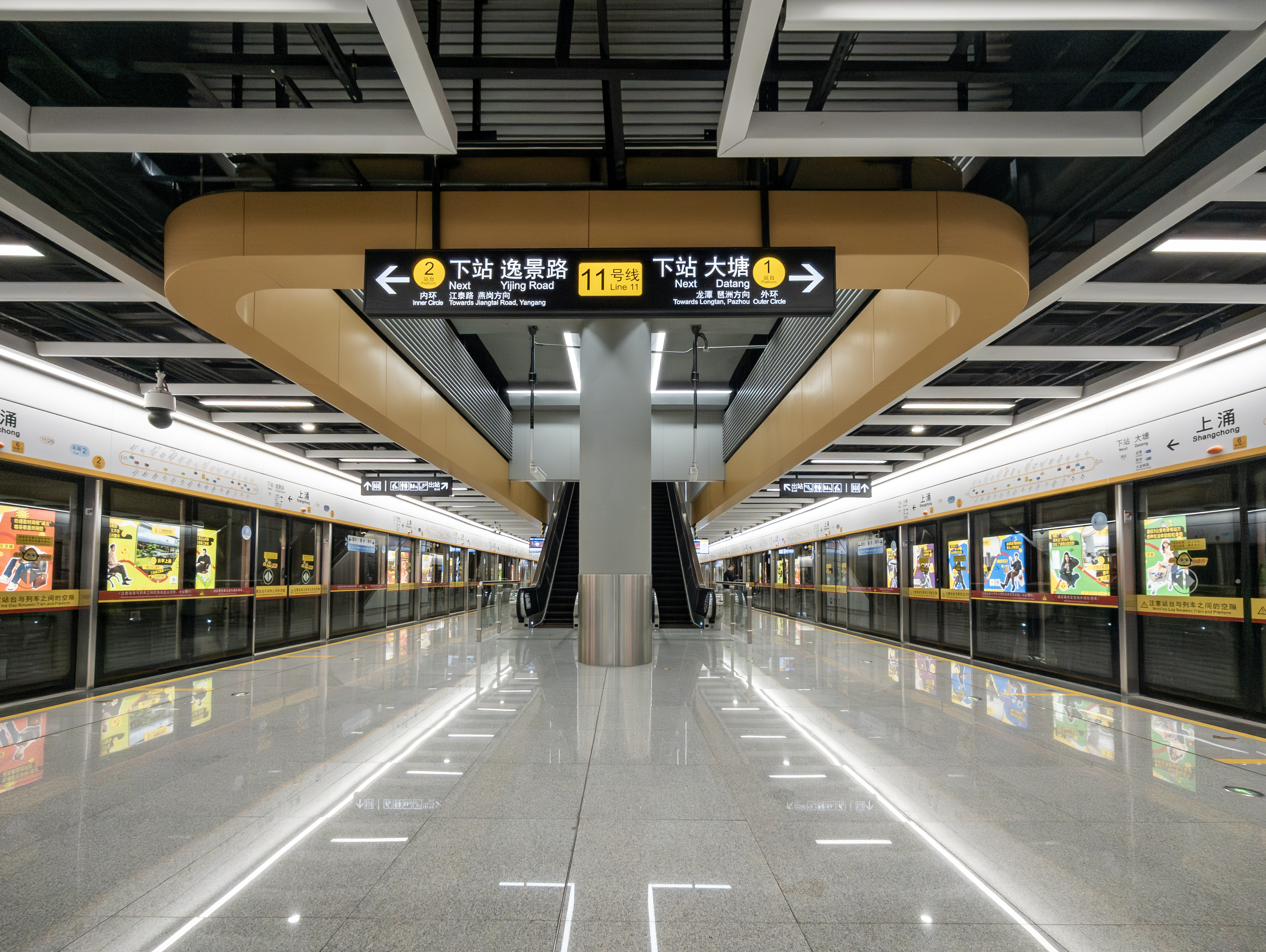
- Platform

Chinese name
- Chinese: 上涌站
Transcriptions
Standard Mandarin
- Hanyu Pinyin: Shàngchōng Zhàn
Yue: Cantonese
- Yale Romanization: Seungchūng Jaahm
- Jyutping: Soeng^{6}cung^{1} Zaam^{6}
- Hong Kong Romanization: Sheung Chung station

General information
- Location: Northwest corner of the interchange of Xinjiao Road (新滘路) and Guangzhou Avenue (广州大道), Nanzhou Subdistrict; Haizhu District, Guangzhou, Guangdong; China
- Coordinates: 23°4′56.93″N 113°18′26.96″E
- Operator: Guangzhou Metro Co. Ltd.
- Line: Line 11
- Platforms: 2 (1 island platform)
- Tracks: 2

Construction
- Structure type: Underground
- Accessible: Yes

Other information
- Station code: 1129

History
- Opened: 28 December 2024 (19 months ago)

Services
Preceding station	Guangzhou Metro	Following station
Datang Outer Circle	Line 11	Yijing Road Inner Circle
Location

Shangchong Station (Chinese: 上涌站; pinyin: Shàngchōng Zhàn; Cantonese Yale: Seungchūng Jaahm) is a station on Line 11 of the Guangzhou Metro. It started operations on 28 December 2024. It is located underground at the northwest corner of the interchange of Xinjiao Road and Guangzhou Avenue in Haizhu District.

== Structure ==
The station body adopts prefabricated construction technology, and it is the first prefabricated station in South China.

== Station Layout ==
G	-	Exits B, C, D
L1	Lobby	Ticket Machines, Customer Service, Shops, Police Station, Security Facilities, Toilets, Nursery
L2	Mezzanine	Station Equipment
L3; Platforms	Platform 2	11 Inner Circle (Yijing Road)
L3; Platforms	Island platform, doors will open on the left
L3; Platforms	Platform 1	11 Outer Circle (Datang)

=== Entrances/exits ===
The station has 3 points of entry/exit. Exit B is equipped with an elevator.

- B: Guangzhou Avenue South
- C: Guangzhou Avenue South
- D: Guangzhou Avenue South
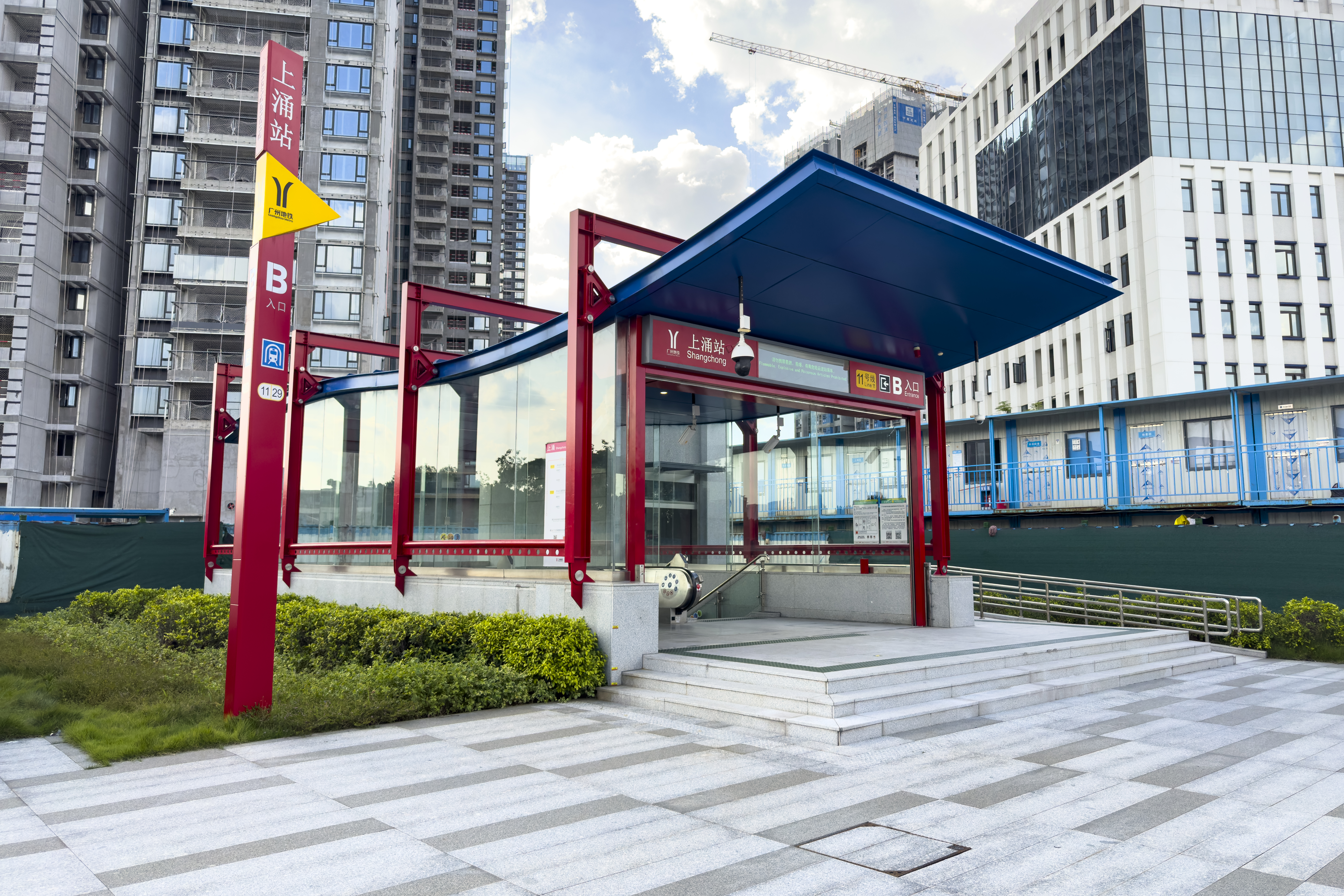
Entrance B

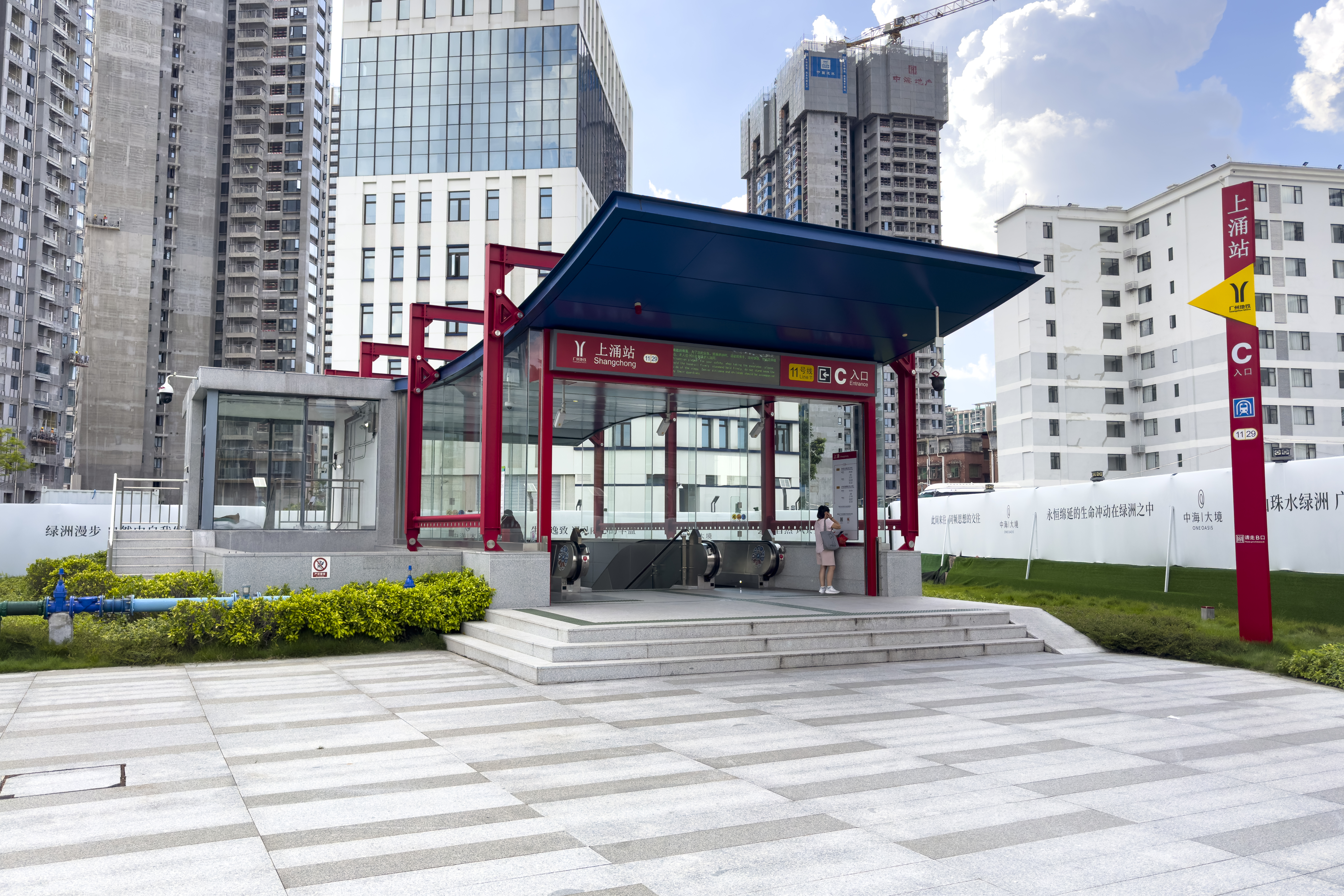
Entrance C

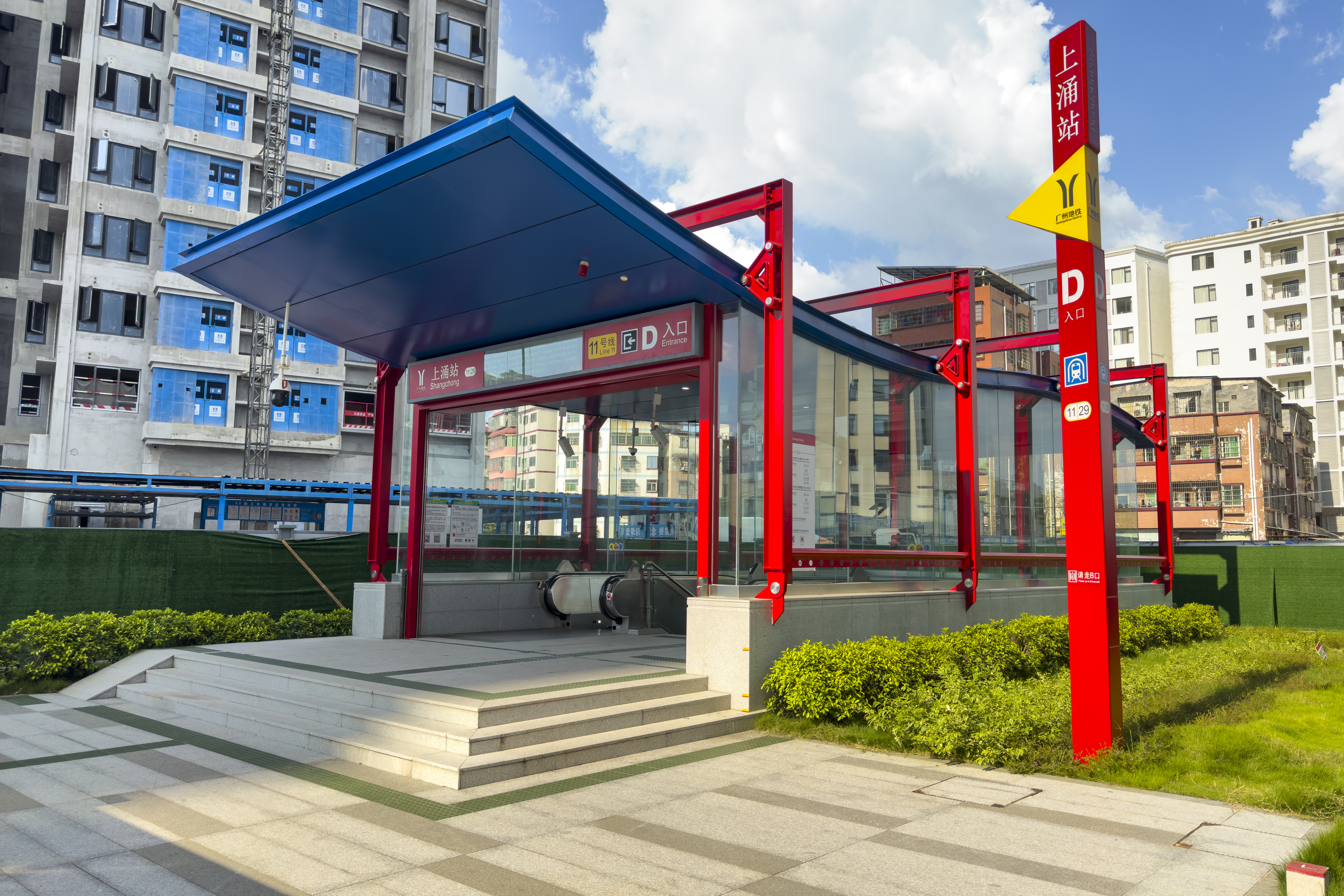
Entrance D

== History ==
In the planning of Line 11 before 2013, there was no station in Shangchong Park. Later, in order to enhance the metro coverage in the area of Guangzhou Avenue South, the authorities planned to add a new station called Shangchong Park, which was finally confirmed in December 2013 when the first EIA was announced.

In June 2023, the initial name of the stations of Line 11 was announced, and this station will be named Shangchong station, and then it was confirmed as the official station name in May 2024.

On 30 July 2024, the station completed the "three rights" transfer. On 28 December, the station was opened with the opening of Line 11.

== Gallery ==
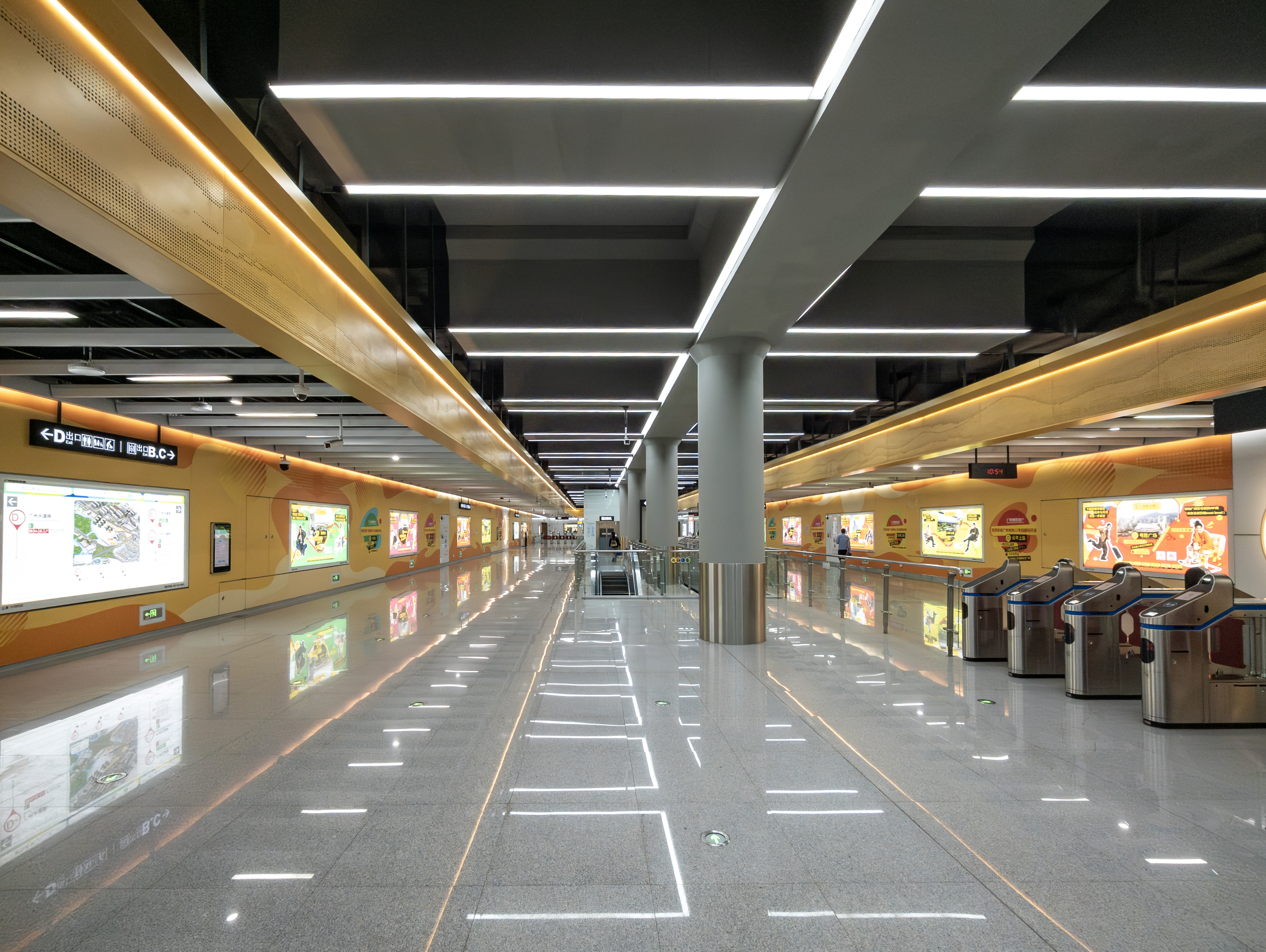
Concourse

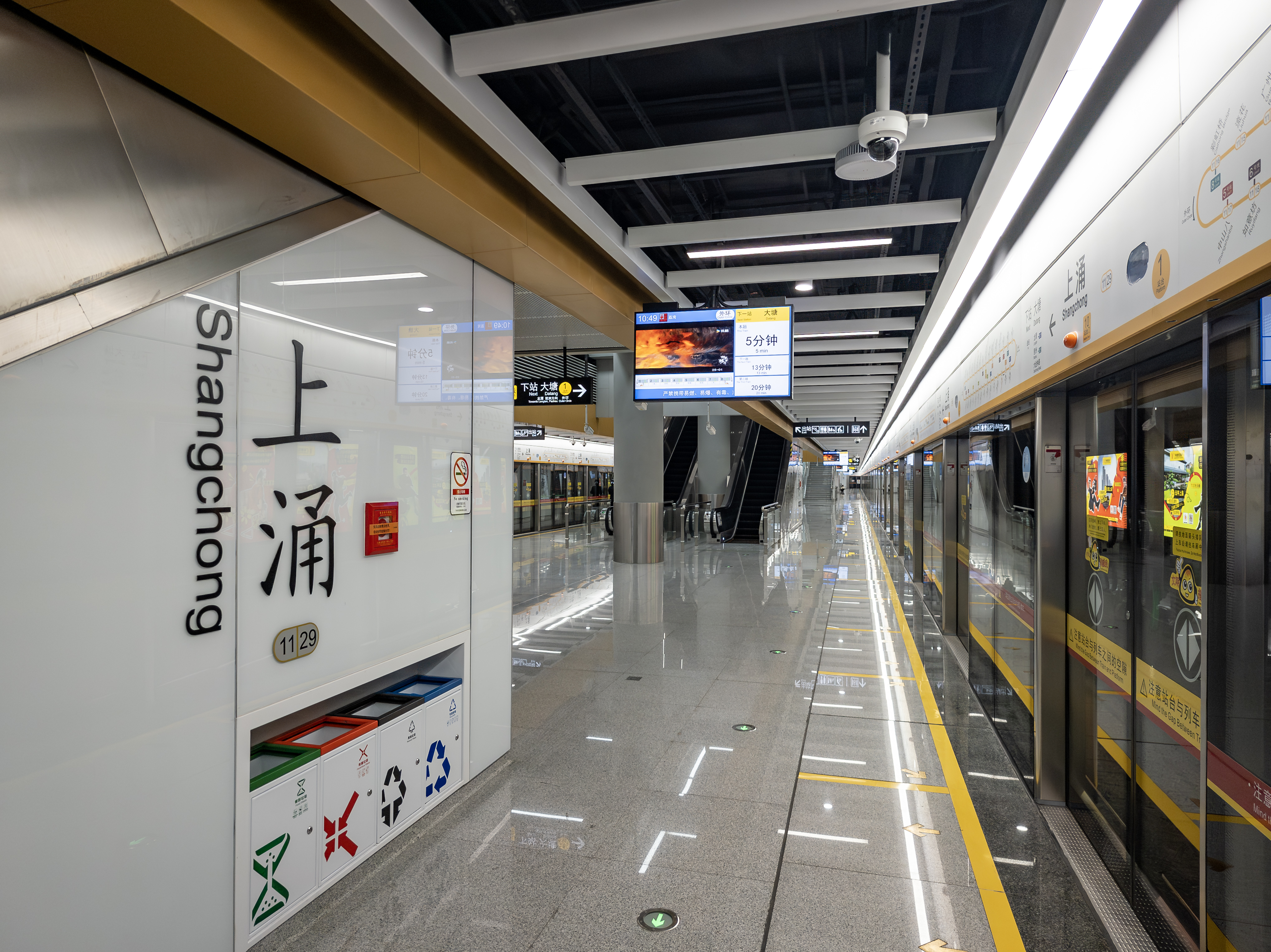
Platform 1 (Outer Circle platform)

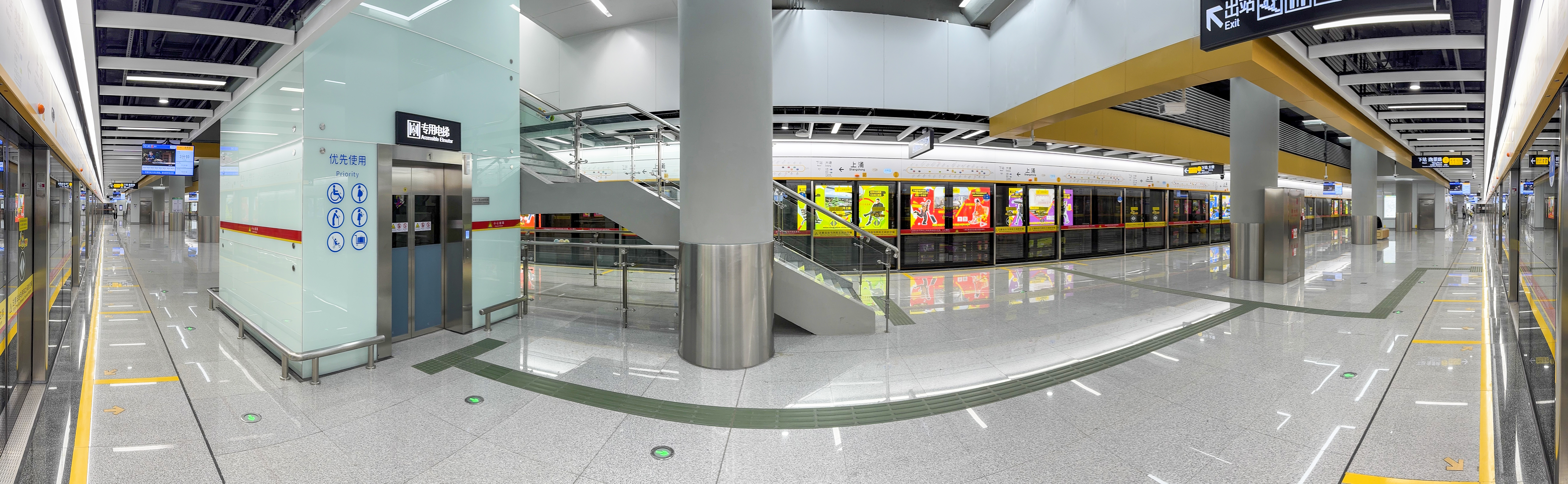
Platform panorama
