= Yijing Road station =

Guangzhou Metro Line 11 station

Yijing Road 逸景路
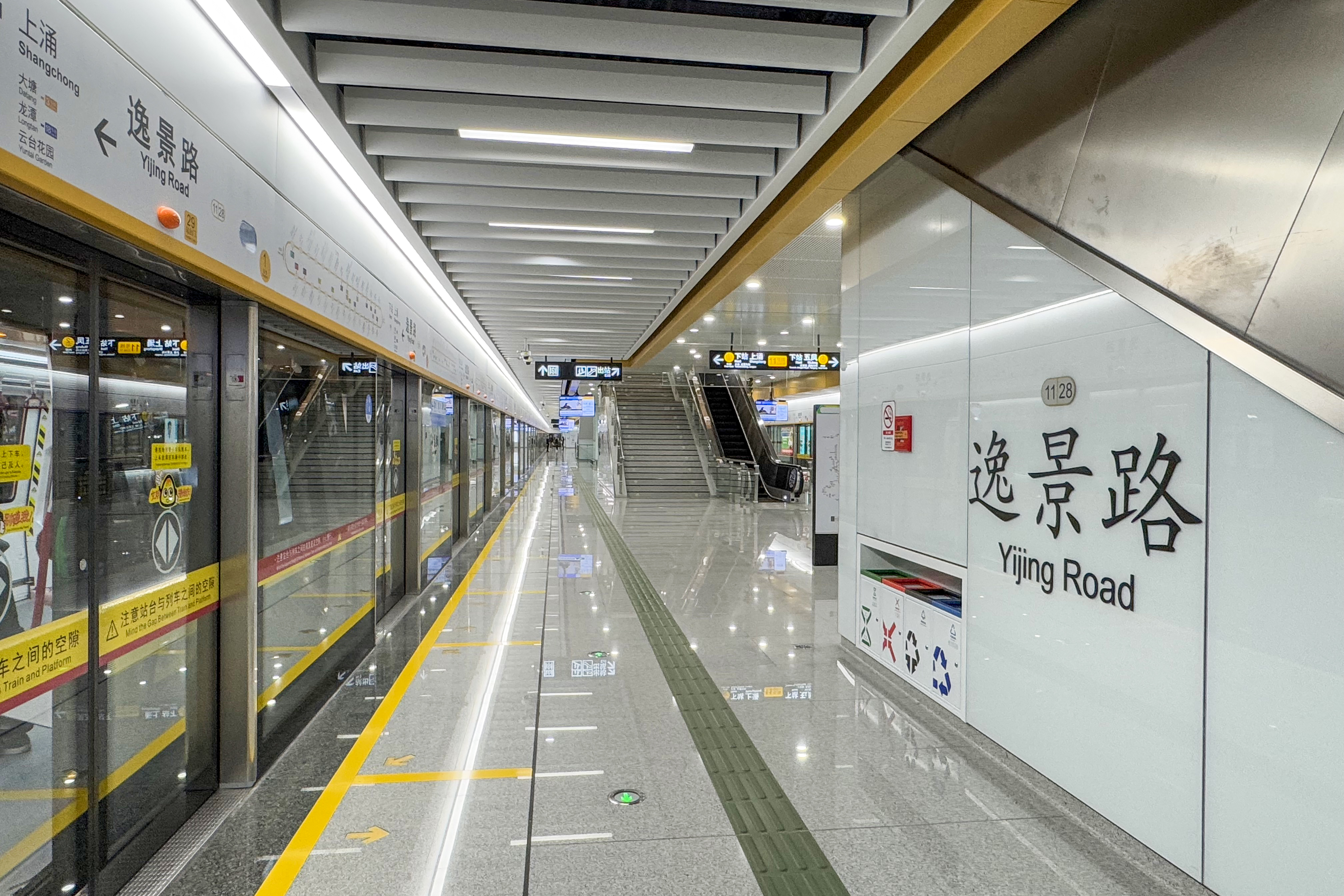
- Platform

Chinese name
- Chinese: 逸景路站
Transcriptions
Standard Mandarin
- Hanyu Pinyin: Yìjǐng Lù Zhàn
Yue: Cantonese
- Yale Romanization: Yatgínglǒu Jaahm
- Jyutping: Jat^{6}ging^{2}lou^{6} Zaam^{6}

General information
- Location: Intersection of Yijing Road (逸景路) and Fangsheng Street (芳盛街), Fengyang Subdistict; Haizhu District, Guangzhou, Guangdong; China
- Coordinates: 23°5′5.03″N 113°17′56.15″E
- Operator: Guangzhou Metro Co. Ltd.
- Line: Line 11
- Platforms: 2 (1 island platform)
- Tracks: 2

Construction
- Structure type: Underground
- Accessible: Yes

Other information
- Station code: 1128

History
- Opened: 28 December 2024 (19 months ago)

Services
Preceding station	Guangzhou Metro	Following station
Shangchong Outer Circle	Line 11	Wufeng Inner Circle
Location

Yijing Road Station (Chinese: 逸景路站; pinyin: Yìjǐng Lù Zhàn; Cantonese Yale: Yatgínglǒu Jaahm) is a station on Line 11 of the Guangzhou Metro. It started operations on 28 December 2024. It is located underground at the intersection of Yijing Road and Fangsheng Street in Haizhu District.

== Station Layout ==
G	-	Exits C & D
L1	Lobby	Ticket Machines, Customer Service, Shops, Police Station, Security Facilities
L2; Platforms	Platform 2	11 Inner Circle (Wufeng)
L2; Platforms	Island platform, doors will open on the left (Toilets, Nursery)
L2; Platforms	Platform 1	11 Outer Circle (Shangchong)

=== Entrances/exits ===
The station has 2 points of entry/exit and an unassigned elevator entrance/exit.

- C: Yijing Road, Guangzhou Haizhu District People's Court
- D: Yijing Road
- Elevator entrance/exit
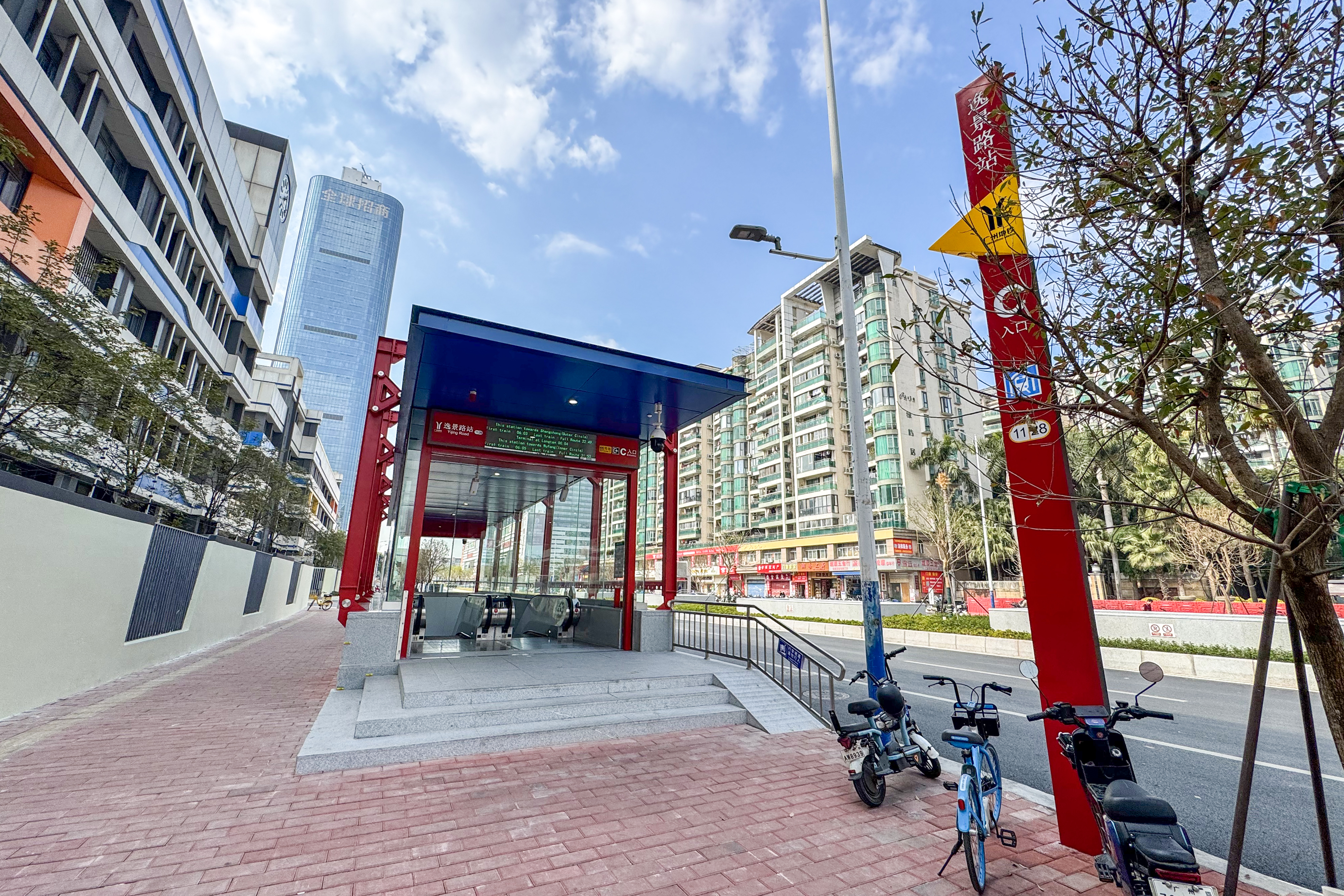
Entrance C

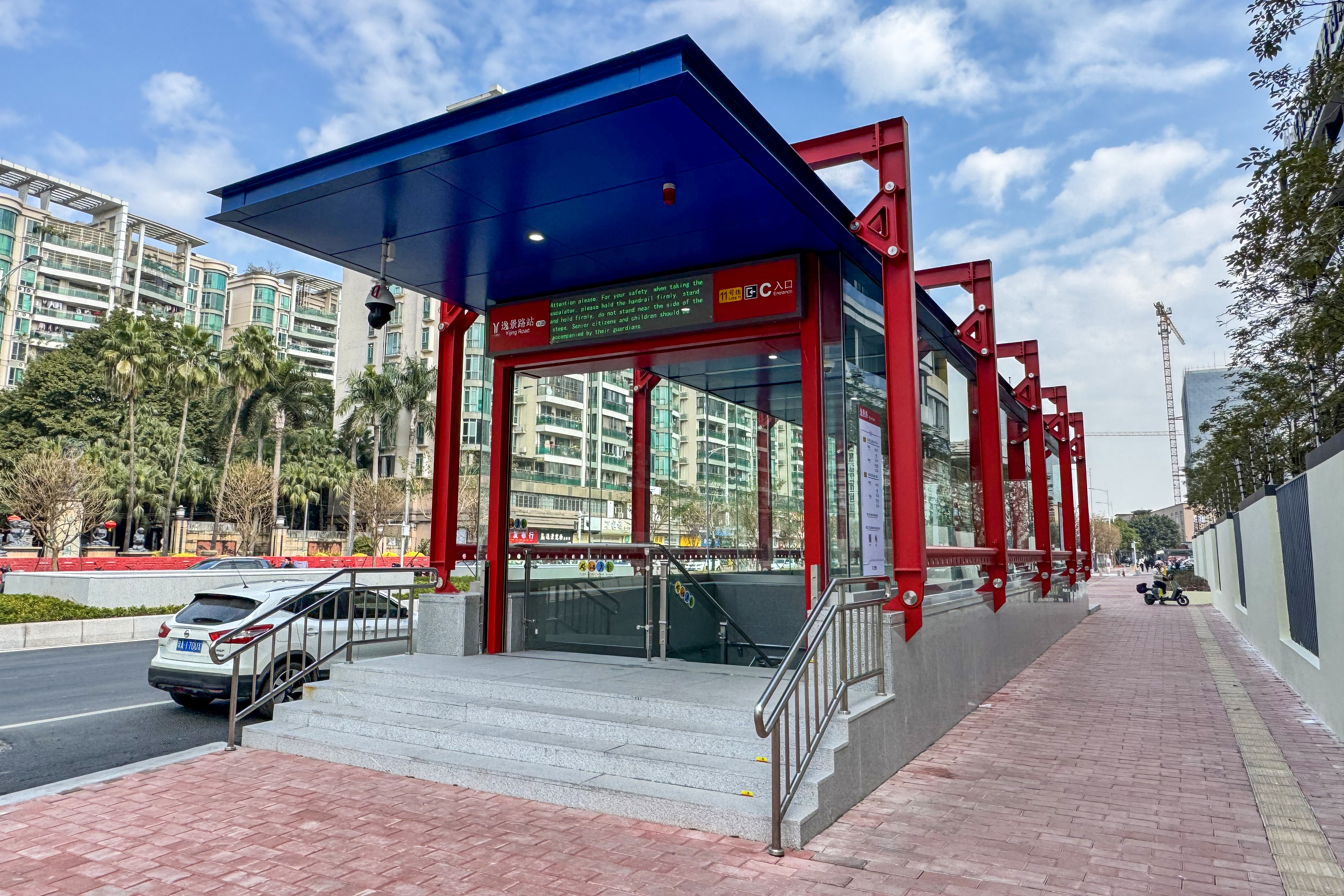
Stairs of Entrance C

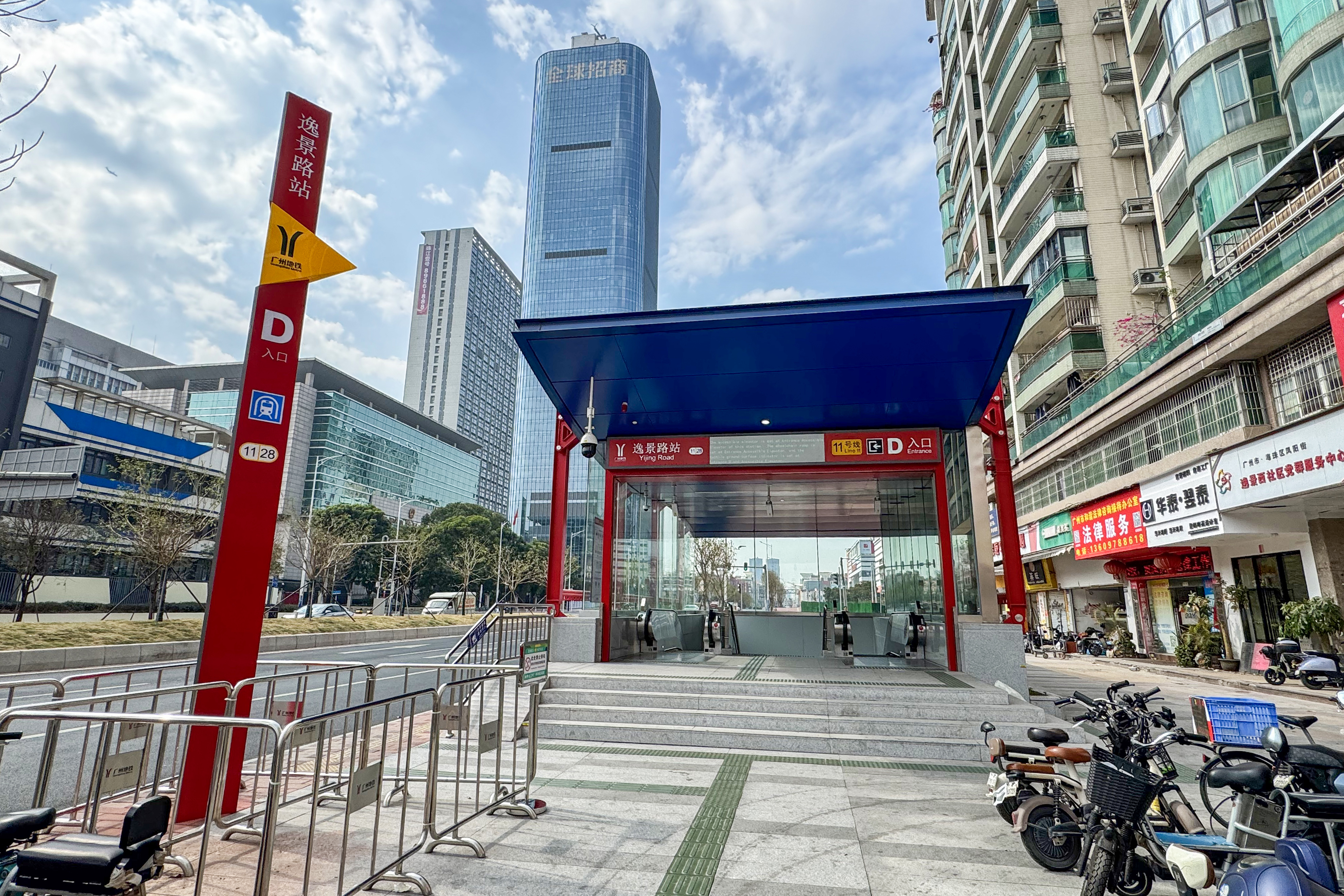
Entrance D

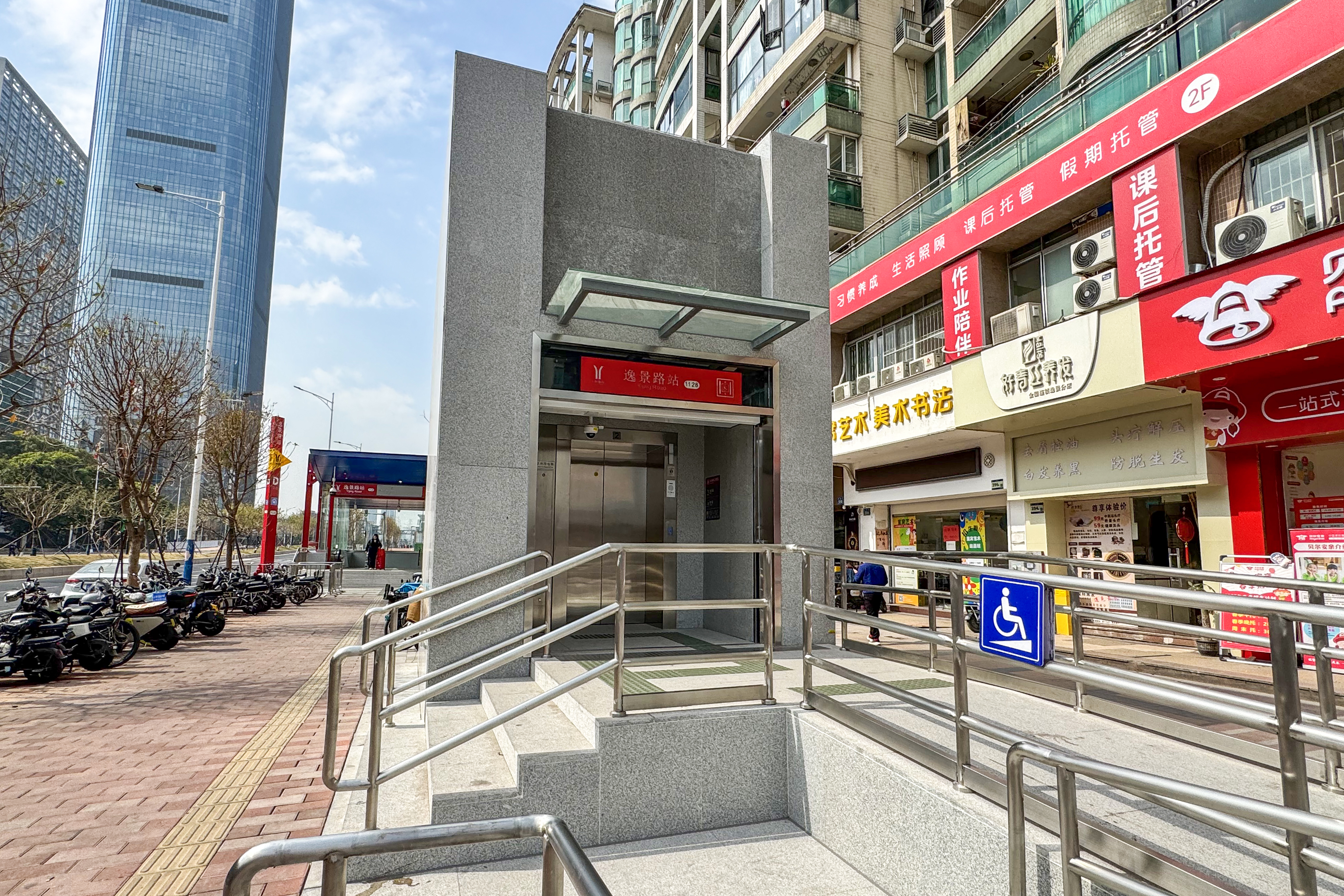
Elevator (adjacent to Entrance D)

== History ==
The station first appeared in 2009 in the "Super Ring Line" scheme of Line 11, then known as He'anwei station. The plan was subsequently adopted, and the construction of the station began under the name of Yijing Lu (Yijing Road) Station, and the main structure was topped out on 8 March 2023. In September 2024, the station completed the "three rights" transfer.

On 28 December 2024, the station was put into use with the opening of Line 11.

== Gallery ==
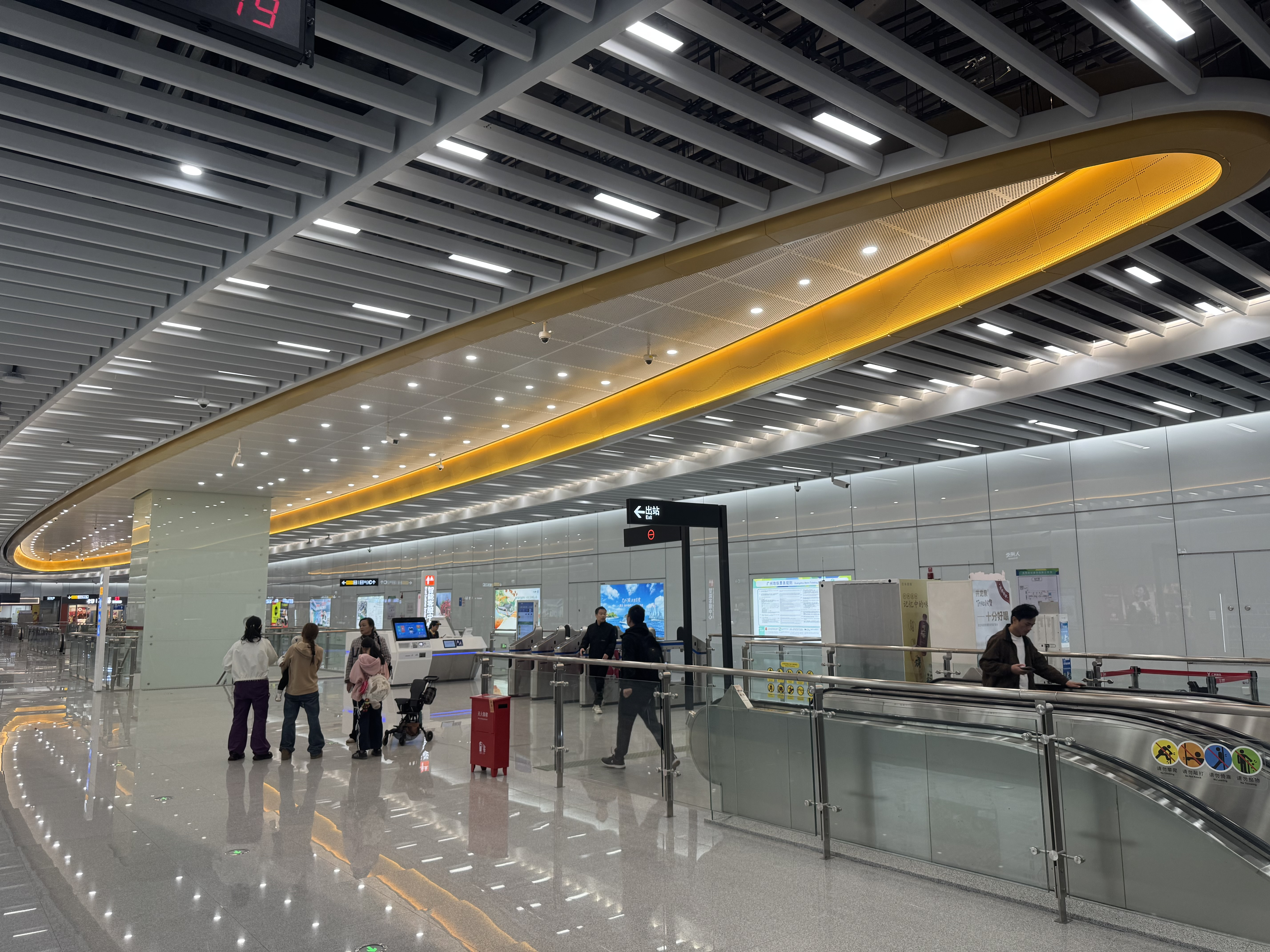
Concourse

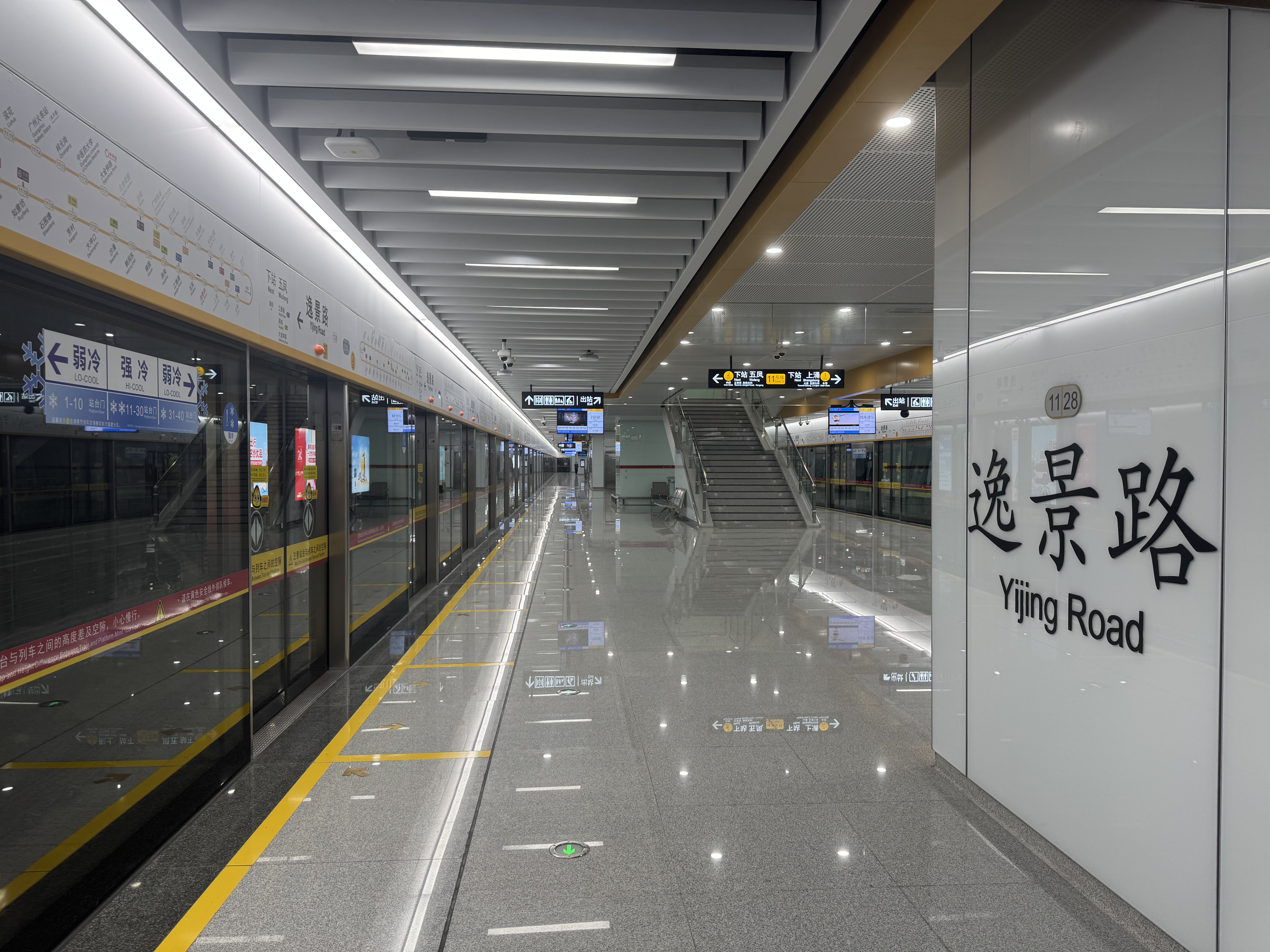
Platform 2 (Inner Circle platform)

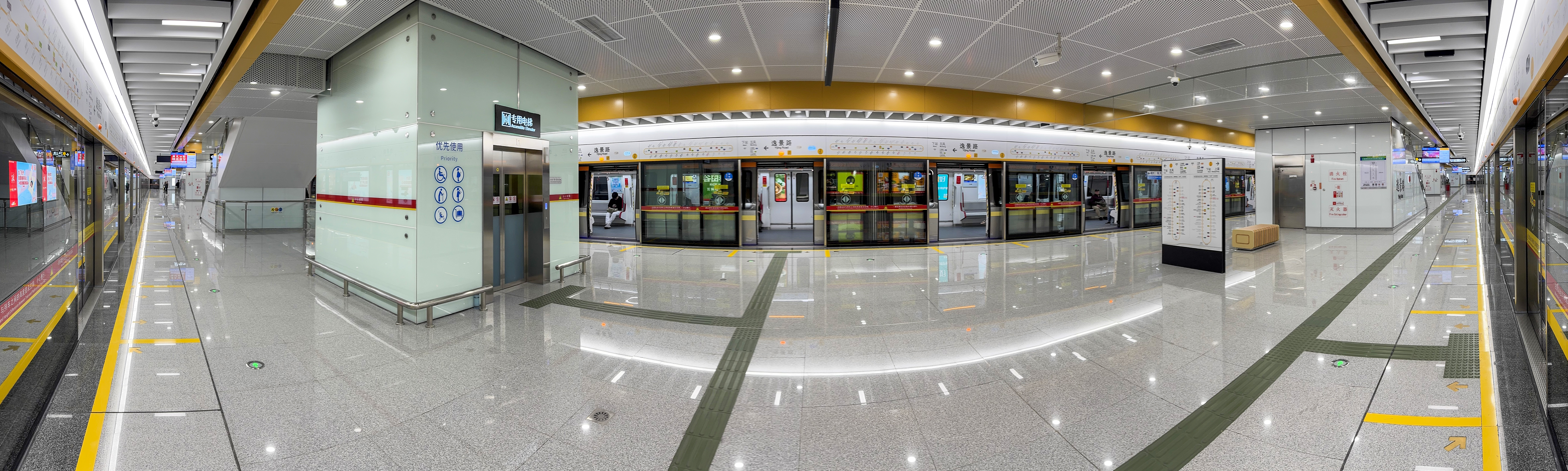
Platform panorama
