= Datang station (Guangzhou Metro) =

Guangzhou Metro Line 3 and Line 11 station

Datang 大塘
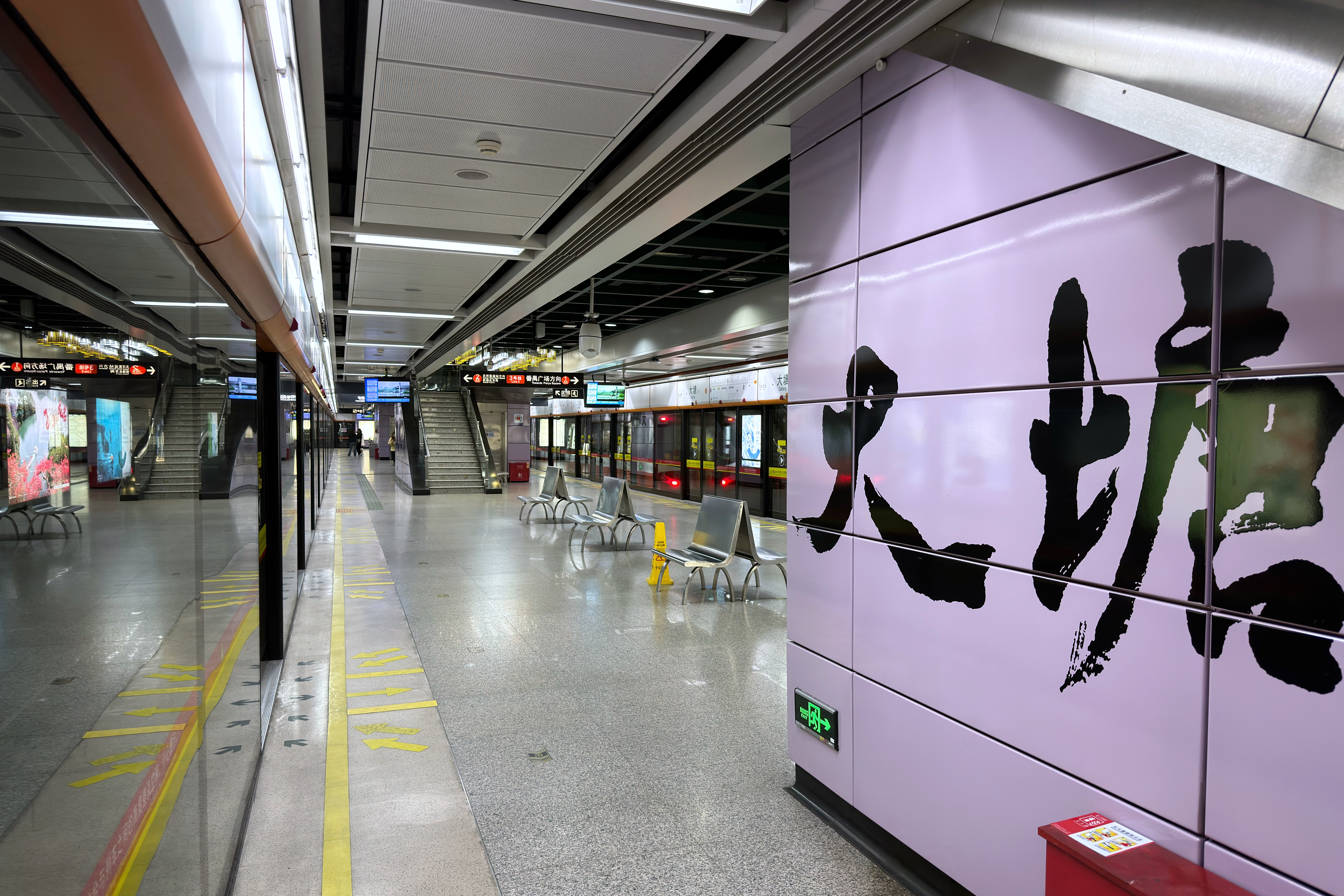
- Line 3 platform

Chinese name
- Chinese: 大塘站
Transcriptions
Standard Mandarin
- Hanyu Pinyin: Dàtáng Zhàn
Yue: Cantonese
- Yale Romanization: Daaihtòhng Jaahm
- Jyutping: Daai^{6}tong^{4} Zaam^{6}
- Hong Kong Romanization: Tai Tong station

General information
- Location: Xinjiao Road Middle (新滘中路), north of Haizhu Lake (海珠湖), Nanzhou Subdistrict; Haizhu District, Guangzhou, Guangdong; China
- Coordinates: 23°4′50.22″N 113°18′58.52″E
- Operator: Guangzhou Metro Co. Ltd.
- Lines: Line 3; Line 11
- Platforms: 4 (2 island platforms)
- Tracks: 4

Construction
- Structure type: Underground
- Accessible: Yes

Other information
- Station code: 307 1130

History
- Opened: Line 3: 30 December 2006 (19 years ago); Line 11: 28 December 2024 (19 months ago)

Services
| Preceding station | Guangzhou Metro | Following station |
|---|---|---|
| Lijiao towards Haibang | Line 3 | Kecun towards Airport North (Terminal 2) or Tianhe Coach Terminal |
| Longtan Outer Circle | Line 11 | Shangchong Inner Circle |
Location

Datang station (Chinese: 大塘站; pinyin: Dàtáng Zhàn; Cantonese Yale: Daaihtòhng Jaahm) is an interchange station between Line 3 and Line 11 of the Guangzhou Metro. Line 3 started operations on 28 December 2006. Line 11 started operations on 28 December 2024. It is located underground Datang Village (大塘村) along East Xinjiao Road (新滘东路) in Haizhu District. It is near the Taxation Bureau of Haizhu district (海珠区税务局) and the Tianxiong Cloth Market Center (天雄布匹市场), as well as to the north of Haizhu Lake (海珠湖).

== Station layout ==
=== Line 3 ===
| L1; Concourse | Lobby | Ticket Machines, Customer Service, Shops, Police Station, Security Facilities, Transfer to Line 11 |
| L2; Platforms | Platform 1 | 3 towards Haibang (Lijiao) |
| L2; Platforms | Island platform, doors will open on the left |
| L2; Platforms | Platform 2 | 3 towards Tianhe Coach Terminal or Airport North (Terminal 2) (Kecun) |

=== Line 11 ===
| L1; Concourse | Lobby | Ticket Machines, Customer Service, Shops, Police Station, Security Facilities, Transfer to Line 3 |
| L2 | - | Station Equipment |
| L3; Platforms | Platform 4 | 11 Inner Circle (Shangchong) |
| L3; Platforms | Island platform, doors will open on the left (Toilets, Nursery) |
| L3; Platforms | Platform 3 | 11 Outer Circle (Longtan) |

=== Entrances/exits ===
The station has 5 points of entry/exit. Exits B and D were opened with the station's initial opening, and later on Exit A also opened. When Line 11 opened, Exits C and E opened, and a passage was added next to Exit D to connect to the non-paid area of the Line 11 concourse, so the signs leading to Exit D from the Lines 3 and 11 concourses were marked as 'Gate 1' and 'Gate 2' for distinction.

==== Line 3 concourse ====
- A: Xinjiao Road Middle
- B: Xinjiao Road Middle, Haizhu Lake
- D: Xinjiao Road Middle

==== Line 11 concourse ====
- C: Xinjiao Road Middle, Haizhu Lake
- E: Xinjiao Road Middle, Guangzhou Cultural & Arts Centre (Guangzhou Intangible Cultural Heritage Protection Center)

Exit C is equipped with an elevator, and Exit D is equipped with a stairlift.

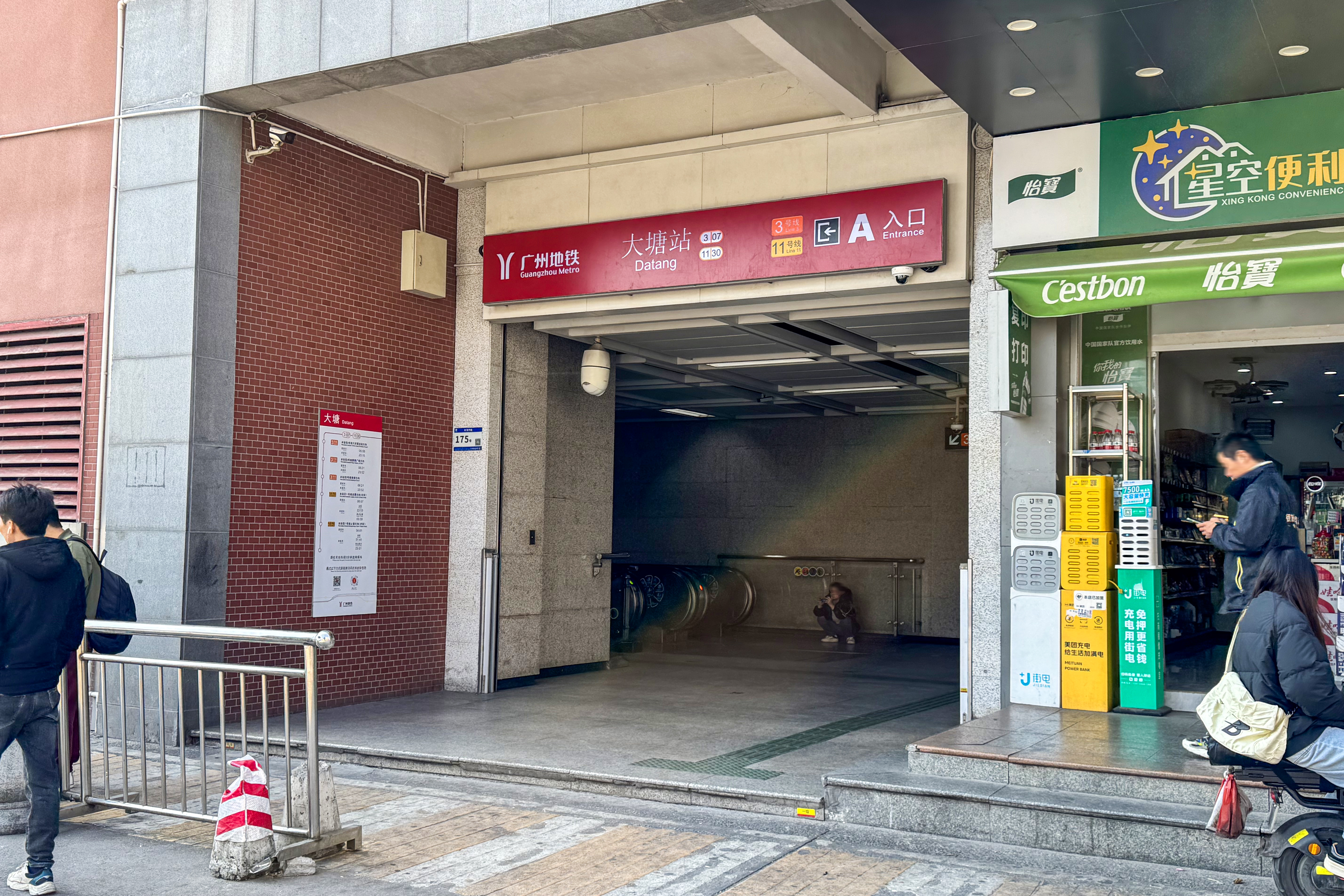
Entrance A

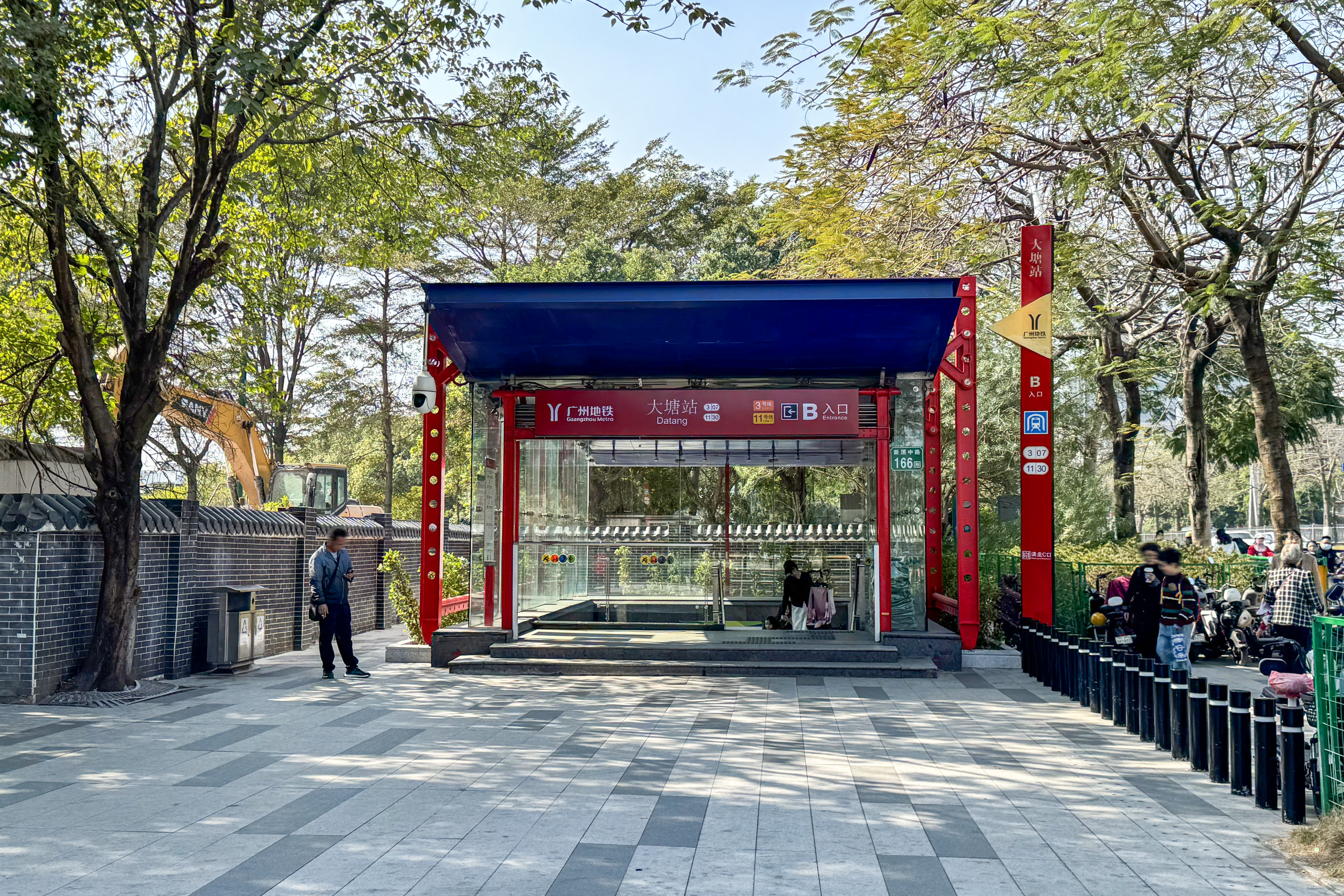
Entrance B

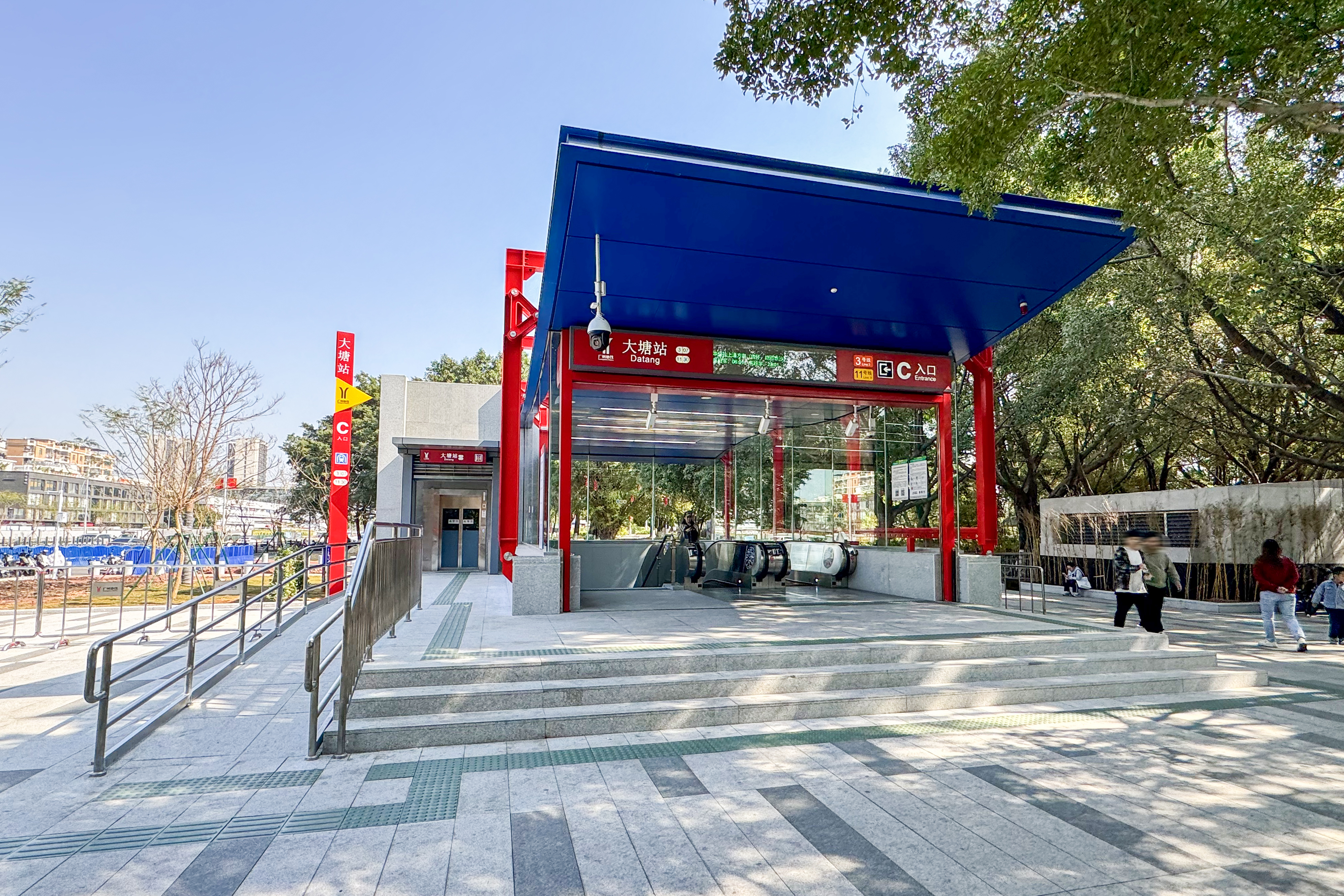
Entrance C

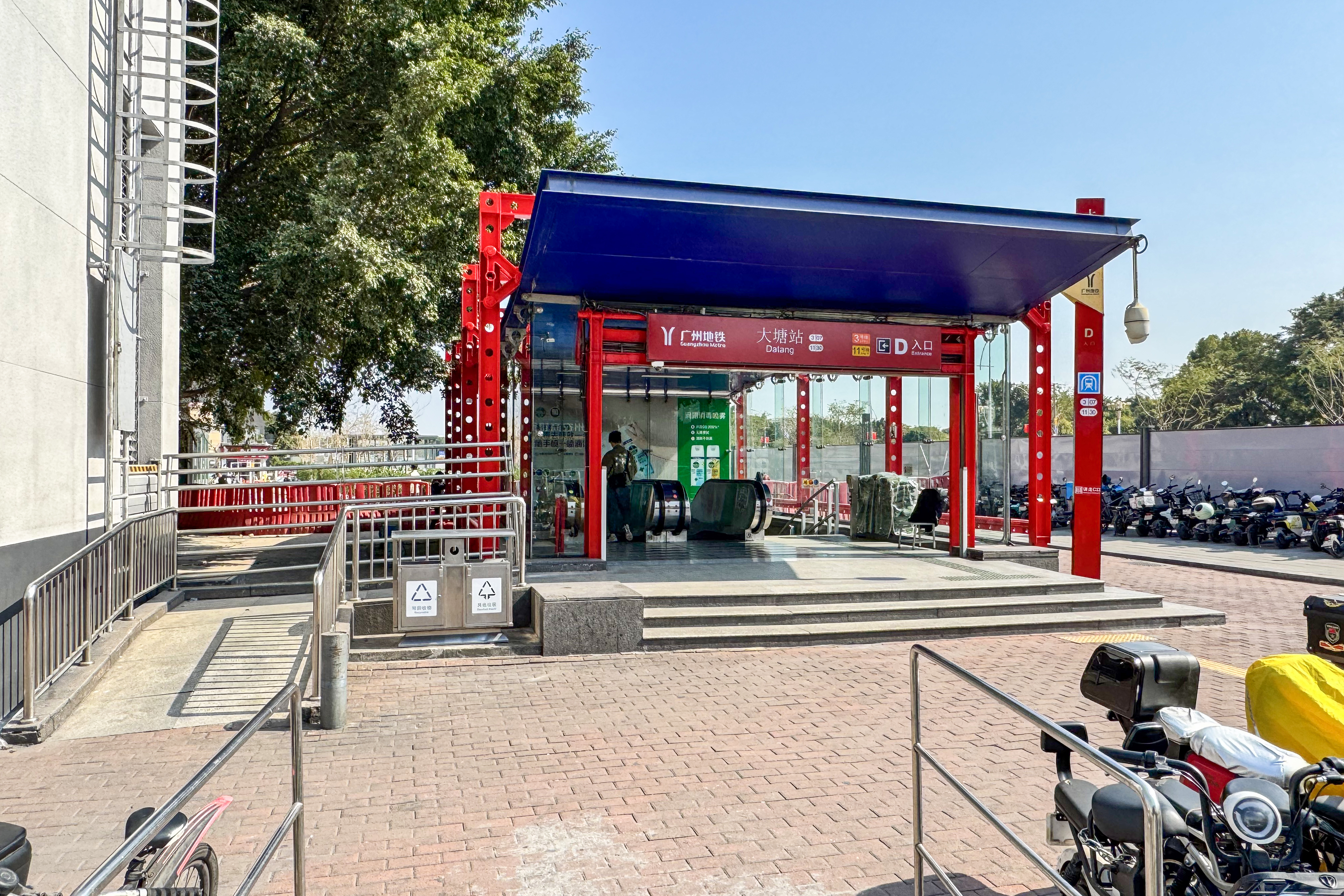
Entrance D

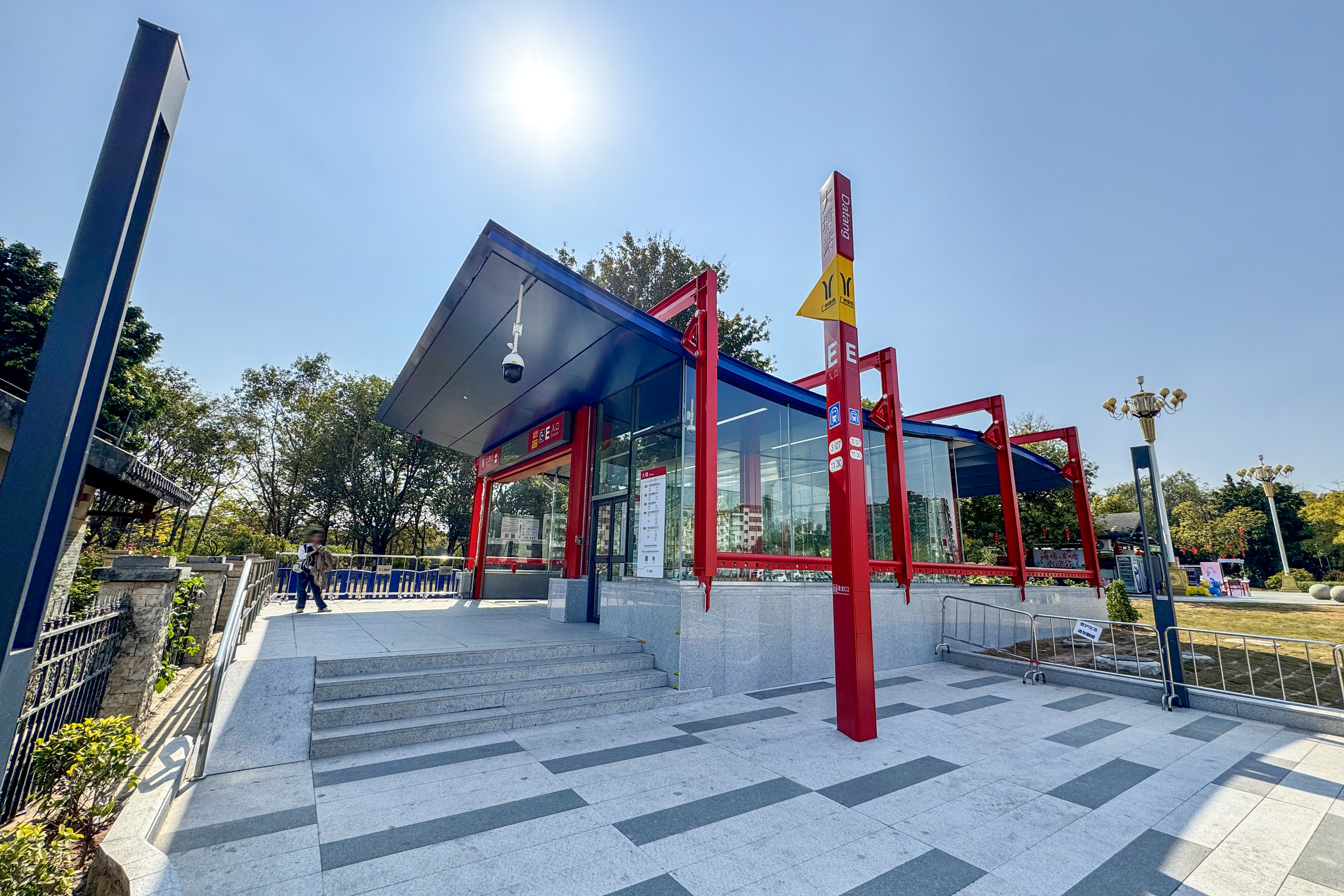
Entrance E

== Gallery ==
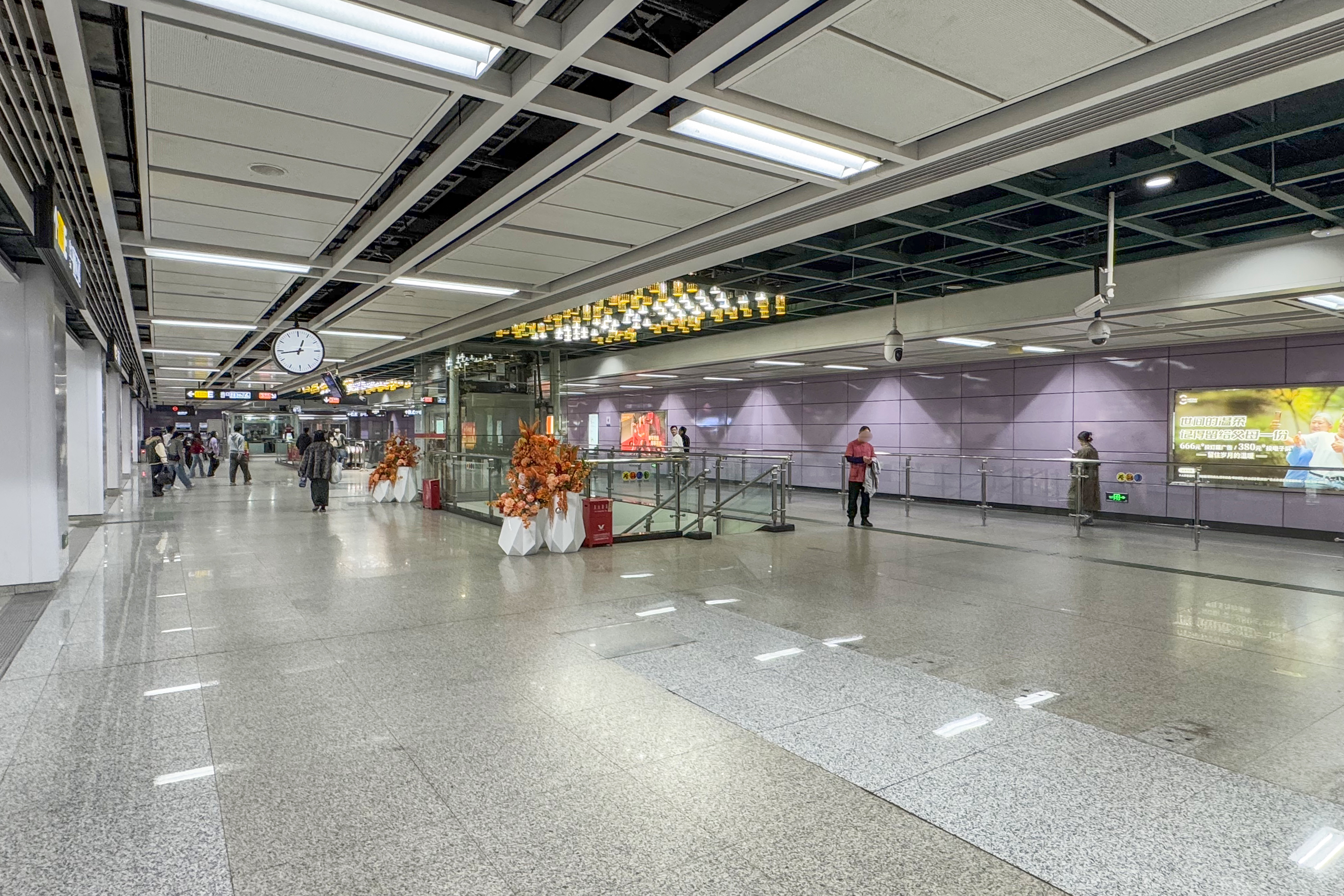
Line 3 concourse

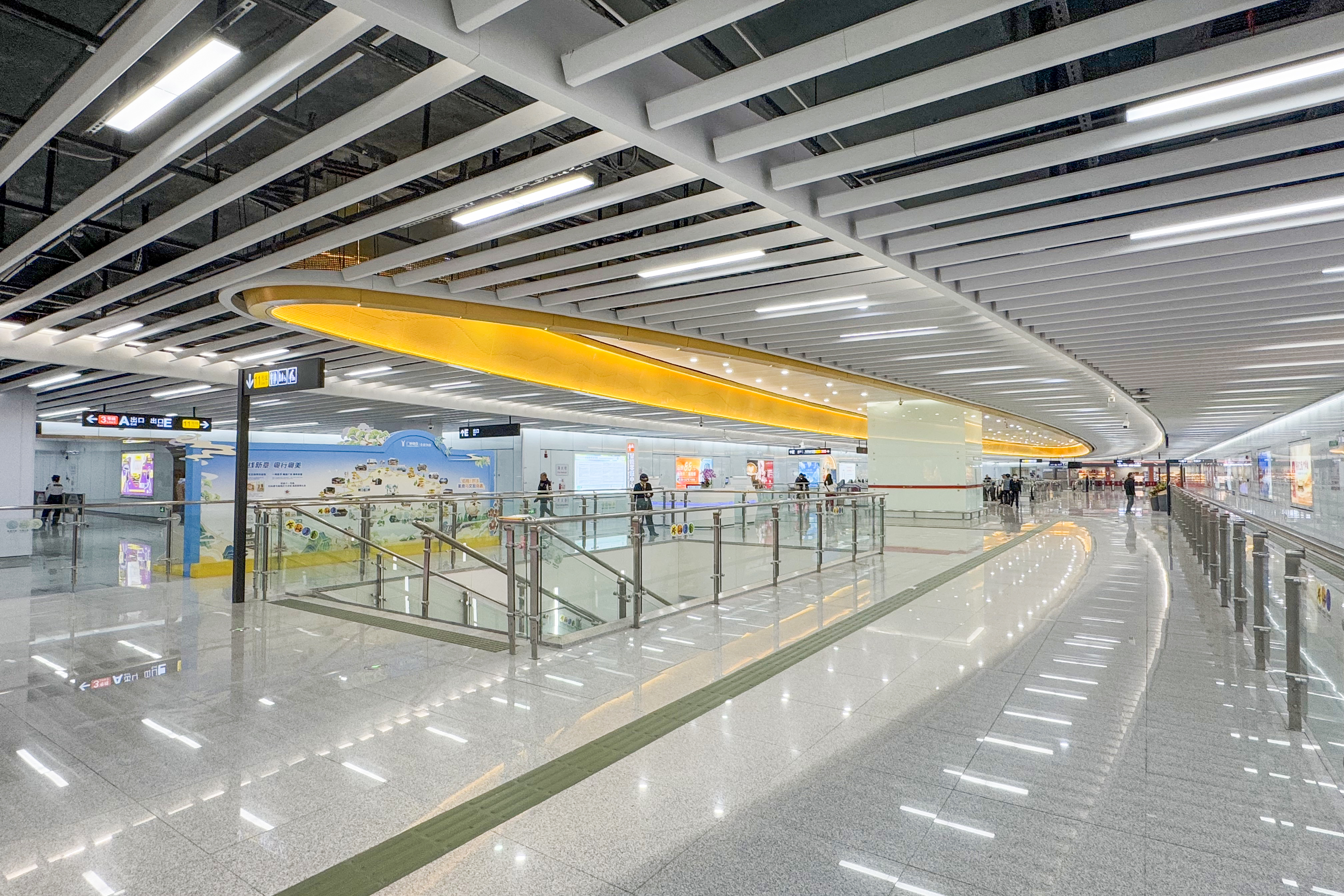
Line 11 concourse

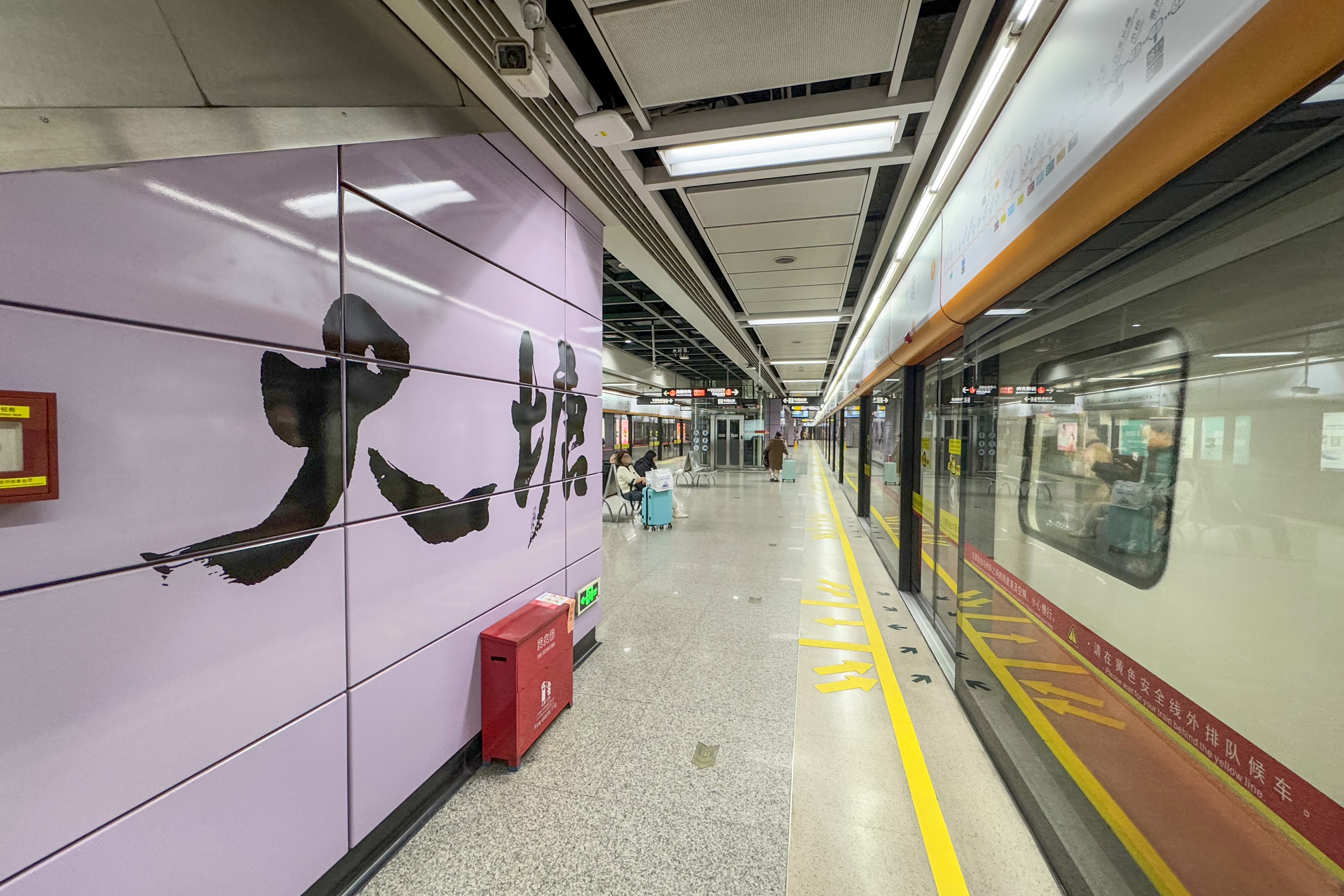
Line 3 platform 1 view

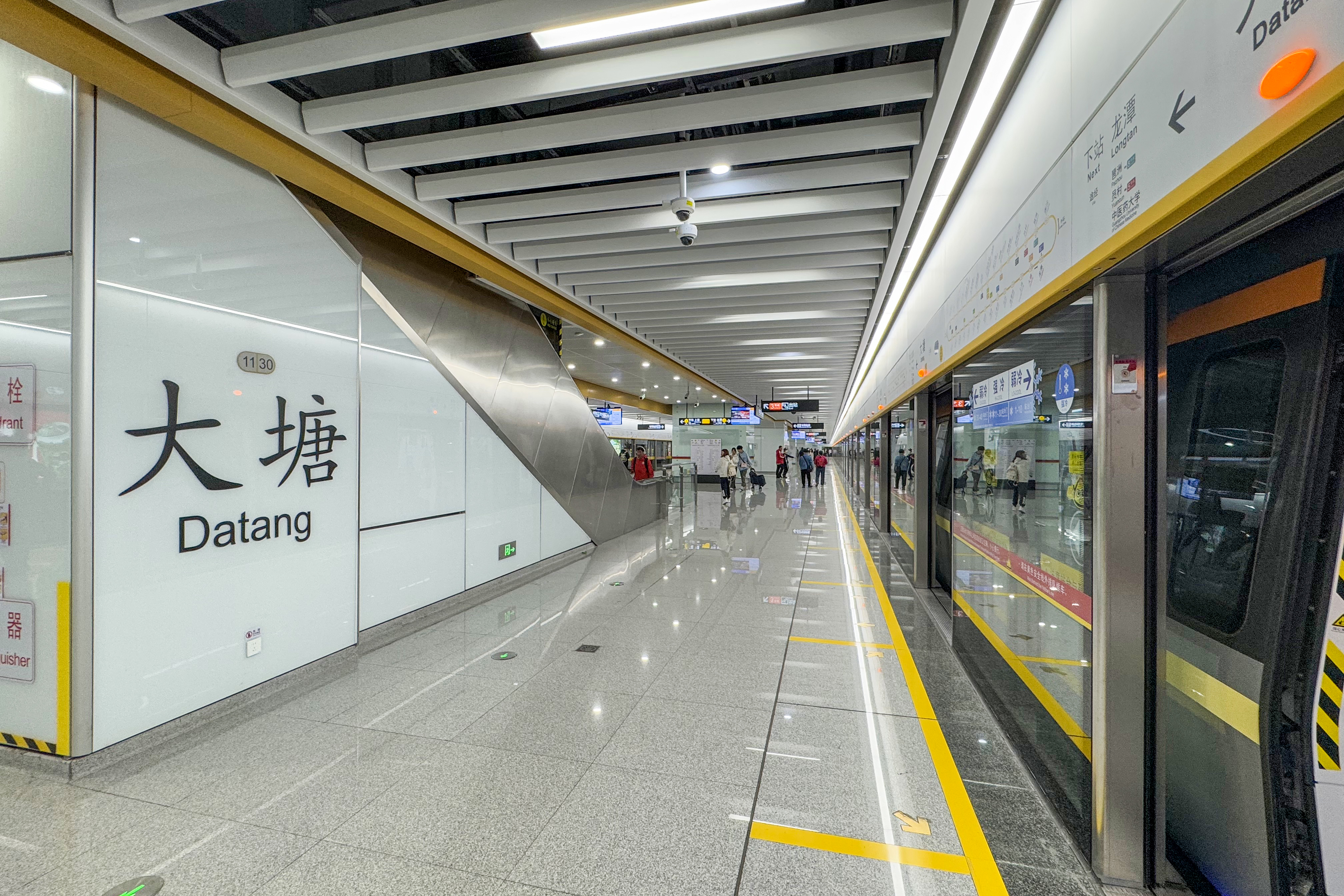
Line 11 platform 4 (Outer Circle platform)

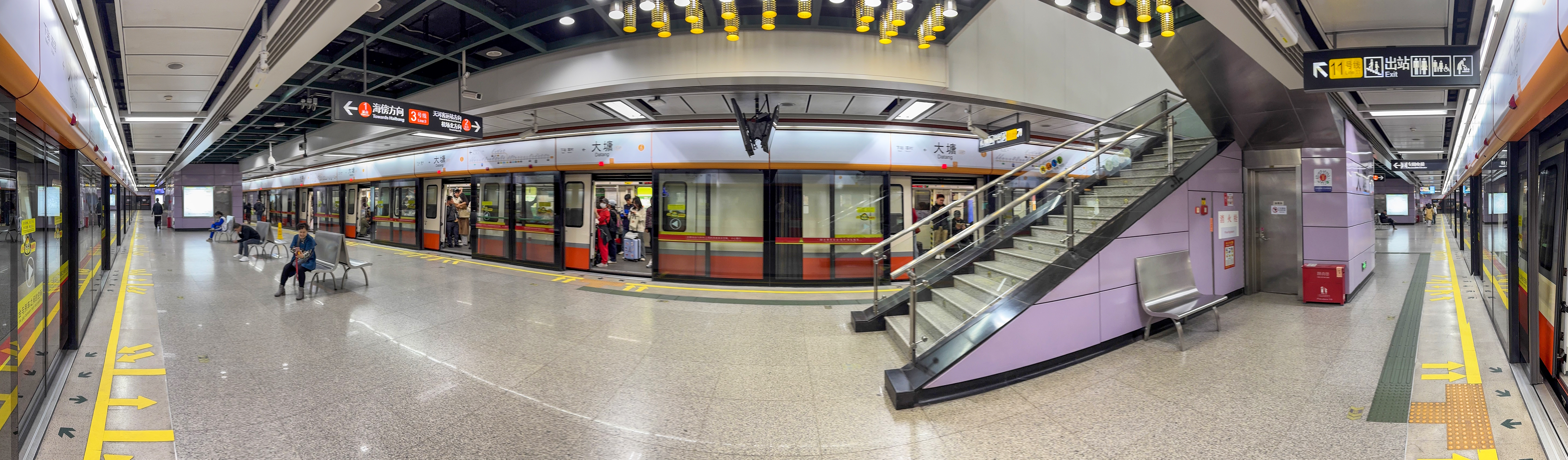
Line 3 platform panorama

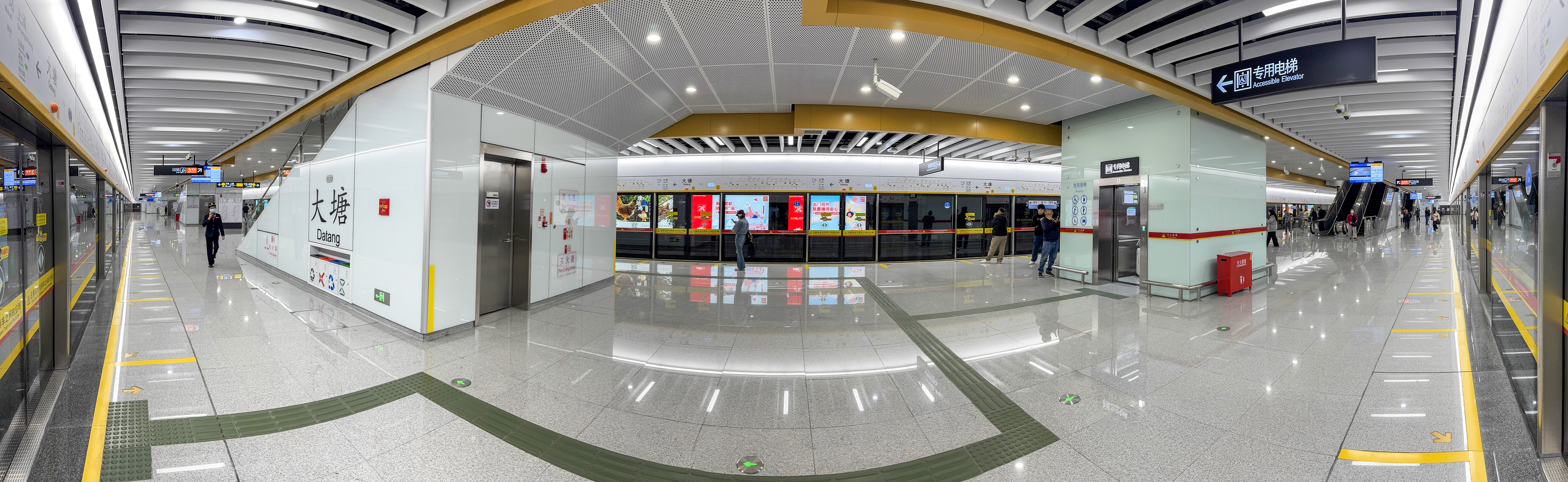
Line 11 platform panorama

== History ==
On 26 December 2001, Datang Station started construction as the experimental section of Line 3 and was topped out on 26 January 2003, becoming the first station to be topped out in the first phase of Line 3. The station also serves as the starting station for the three shield machines of the first phase of Line 3, which play a commanding role in the entire project. On 30 December 2006, the station was officially opened with the first phase of Line 3.

In 2009, the southern half of the Circular Line in the Ring Road Plan was expanded to the Yijing Road and Xinjiao Road corridors south of Line 8, and the station was set up to intersect with Line 3 at the same time. In 2012, Line 11 was included in the 12th Five-Year Plan for Rail Transportation in Guangzhou and was approved, and the construction of Line 11 of this station was also implemented simultaneously.

The construction of the main station structure of the Line 11 station began in March 2020, and the main structure was topped out on December 8. At the beginning of November, the station completed the "three rights" transfer. On 28 December, the station was opened with the opening of Line 11, and the station became an interchange station.

=== Operational incident ===
During COVID-19 pandemic control rules in 2022, the station was affected by prevention and control measures many times and needed to adjust its services. During the epidemic in April, the station was suspended from 12 to 17 April. During the year-end epidemic, the station was suspended from 20:00 on 30 October to the afternoon of 30 November.
