= Jiangtai Road station =

Guangzhou Metro Line 2 and Line 11 station

Jiangtai Road 江泰路
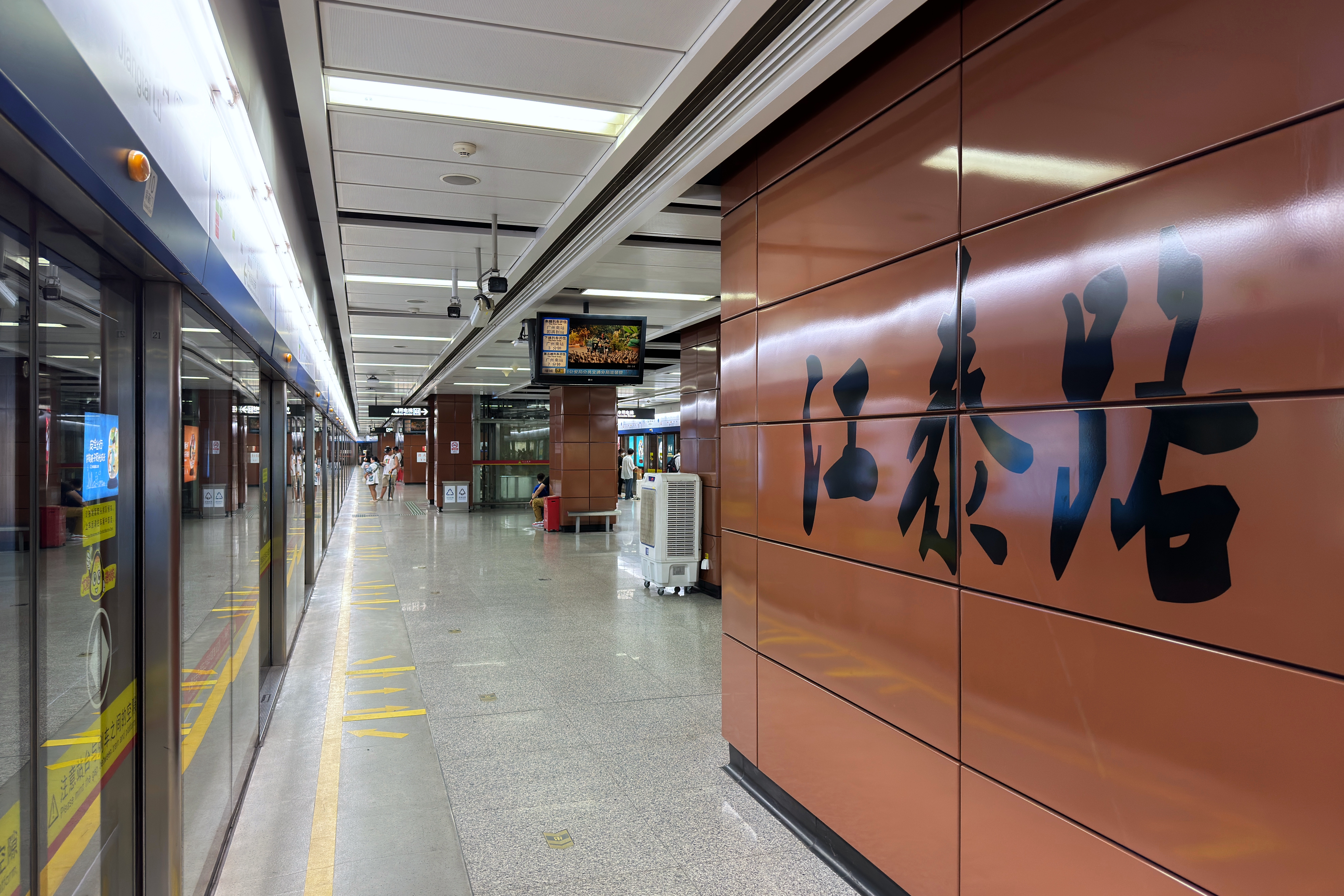
- Line 2 platform

Chinese name
- Chinese: 江泰路站
Transcriptions
Standard Mandarin
- Hanyu Pinyin: Jiāngtài Lù Zhàn
Yue: Cantonese
- Yale Romanization: Gōngtaai Louh Jaahm
- Jyutping: Gong1taai3 Lou6 Zaam6
- Hong Kong Romanization: Kong Tai Road station

General information
- Location: Intersection of Jiangnan Avenue (江南大道) and Jiangtai Road (江泰路), Fengyang Subdistrict; Haizhu District, Guangzhou, Guangdong; China
- Coordinates: 23°5′5.60″N 113°16′30.65″E
- Operator: Guangzhou Metro Co. Ltd.
- Lines: Line 2; Line 11
- Platforms: 4 (2 island platforms)
- Tracks: 4

Construction
- Structure type: Underground
- Accessible: Yes

Other information
- Station code: 208 1126

History
- Opened: Line 2: 25 September 2010 (15 years ago); Line 11: 28 December 2024 (19 months ago)
- Former names: Jiangtai Lu (2010-27 December 2024)

Services
Preceding station	Guangzhou Metro	Following station
Dongxiao South towards Guangzhou South Railway Station	Line 2	Changgang towards Jiahewanggang
Wufeng Outer Circle	Line 11	Yangang Inner Circle
Location

Jiangtai Road Station (Chinese: 江泰路站; pinyin: Jiāngtài Lù Zhàn; Cantonese Yale: Gōngtaai Louh Jaahm) is an interchange station between Line 2 and Line 11 of the Guangzhou Metro. The underground station is located at the junction of Jiangnan Avenue (江南大道) and Jiangtai Road (江泰路) in the Haizhu District of Guangzhou. The Line 2 station opened on 25 September 2010, whilst the Line 11 station opened on 28 December 2024.

== Station layout ==
=== Line 2 ===
G	-	Exits A-D
L1; Concourse	2 Lobby	Ticket Machines, Customer Service, Shops, Police Station, Security Facilities, Transfer to Line 11
L2; Platforms	Platform 2	2 towards Guangzhou South Railway Station (Dongxiao South)
L2; Platforms	Island platform, doors will open on the left
L2; Platforms	Platform 1	2 towards Jiahewanggang (Changgang)

=== Line 11 ===
G	-	Exits E-H
L1; Concourse	11 Lobby	Ticket Machines, Customer Service, Shops, Police Station, Security Facilities, Transfer to Line 2
L2	-	Station Equipment
L3; Platforms	Platform 4	11 Inner Circle (Yangang)
L3; Platforms	Island platform, doors will open on the left (Toilets, Nursery)
L3; Platforms	Platform 3	11 Outer Circle (Wufeng)

=== Entrances/exits ===
The station has 11 points of entry/exit. Exits A, B1, B2, C and D opened with the station's initial opening. When Line 11 opened, 6 entrances/exits lettered E1, E2, F, G, H1 and H2 opened. Exit C is equipped with a stairlift, and Exit G is equipped with an elevator.

==== Line 2 concourse ====
- A: Jiangtai Road
- B1: Jiangnan Avenue South
- B2: Jiangnan Avenue South
- C: Jiangnan Avenue South
- D: Jiangnan Avenue South

==== Line 11 concourse ====
- E1: Jiangyan Road
- E2: Jiangyan Road
- F: Jiangtai Road
- G: Jiangtai Road
- H1: Jiangyan Road
- H2: Jiangyan Road
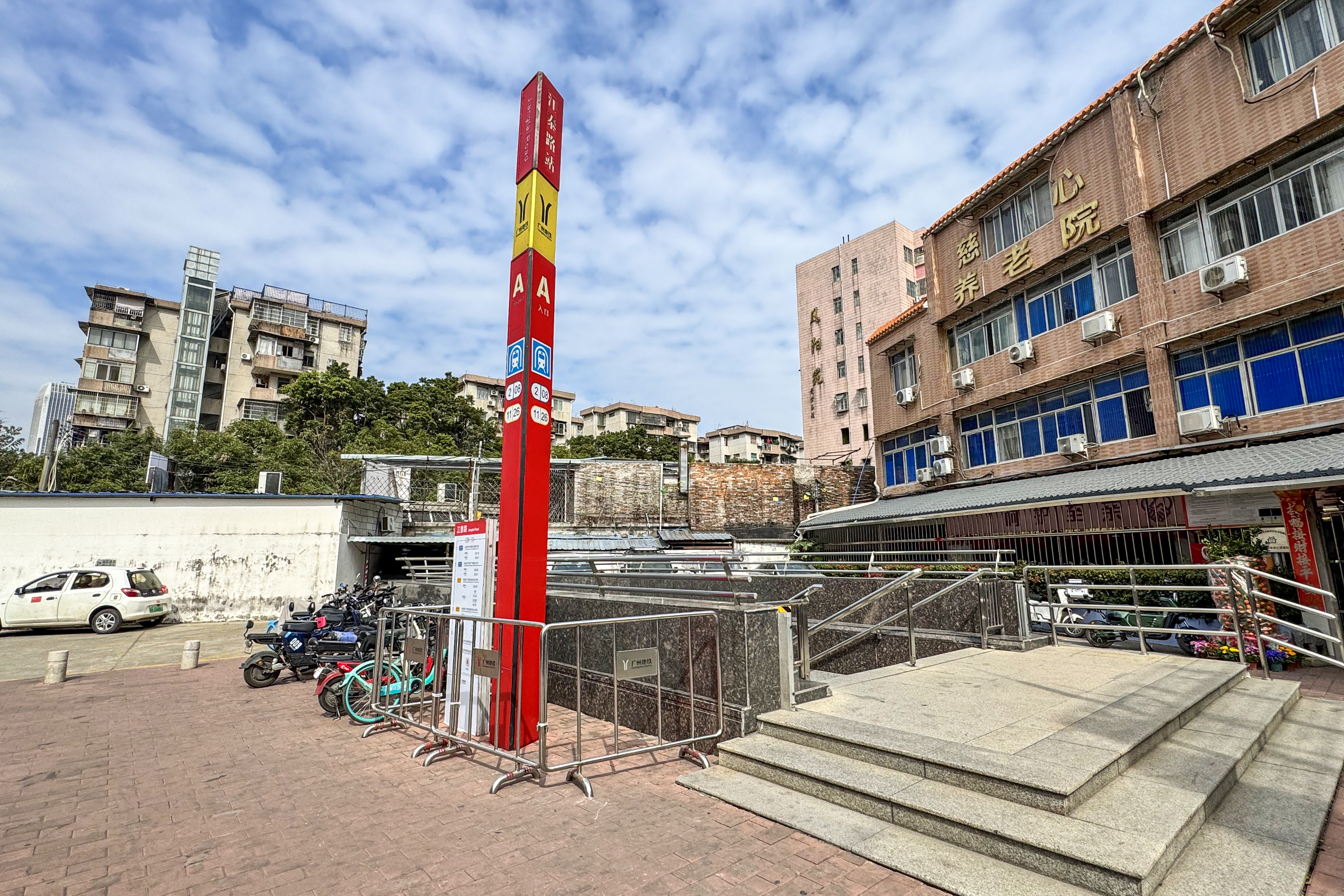
Entrance A

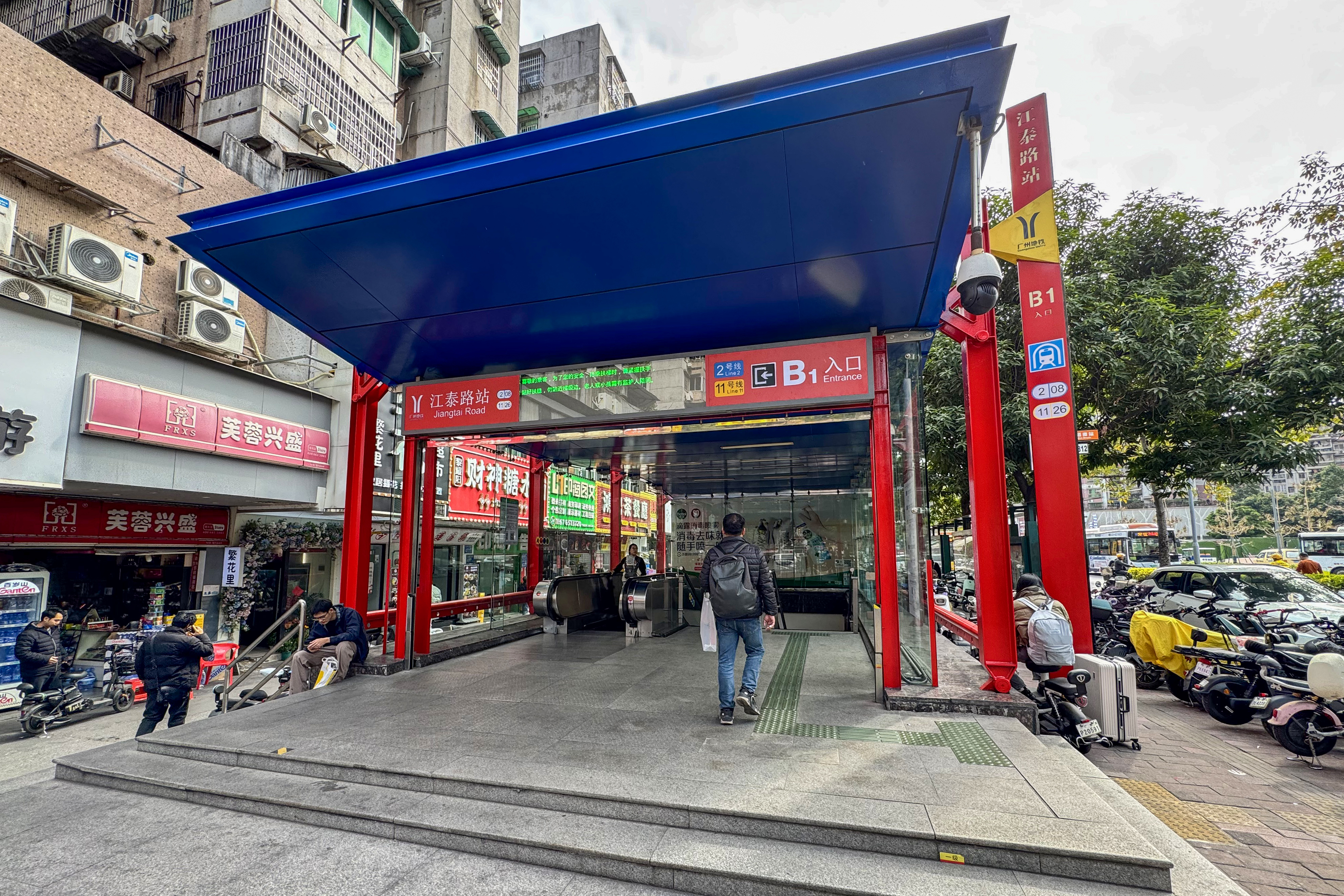
Entrance B1

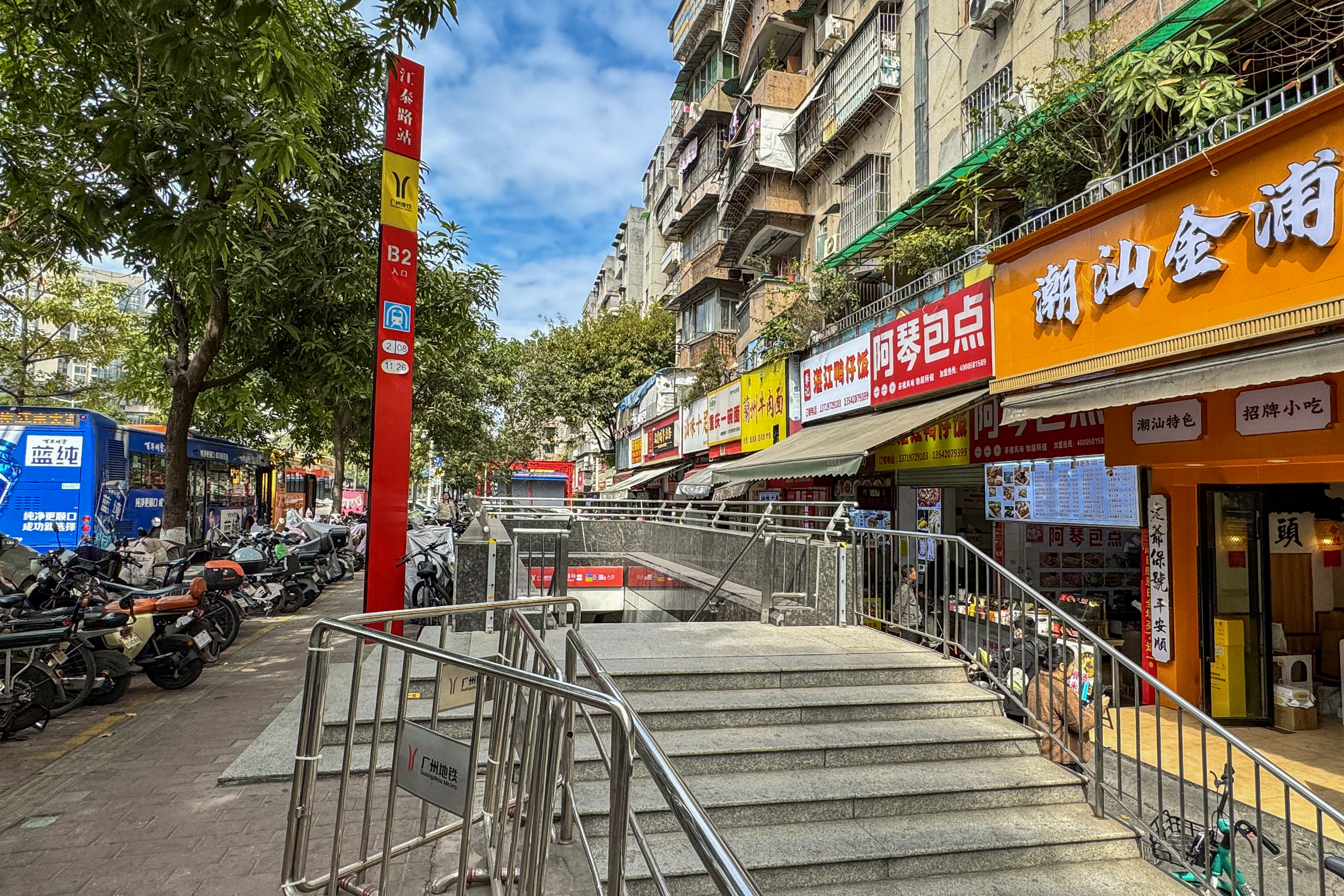
Entrance B2

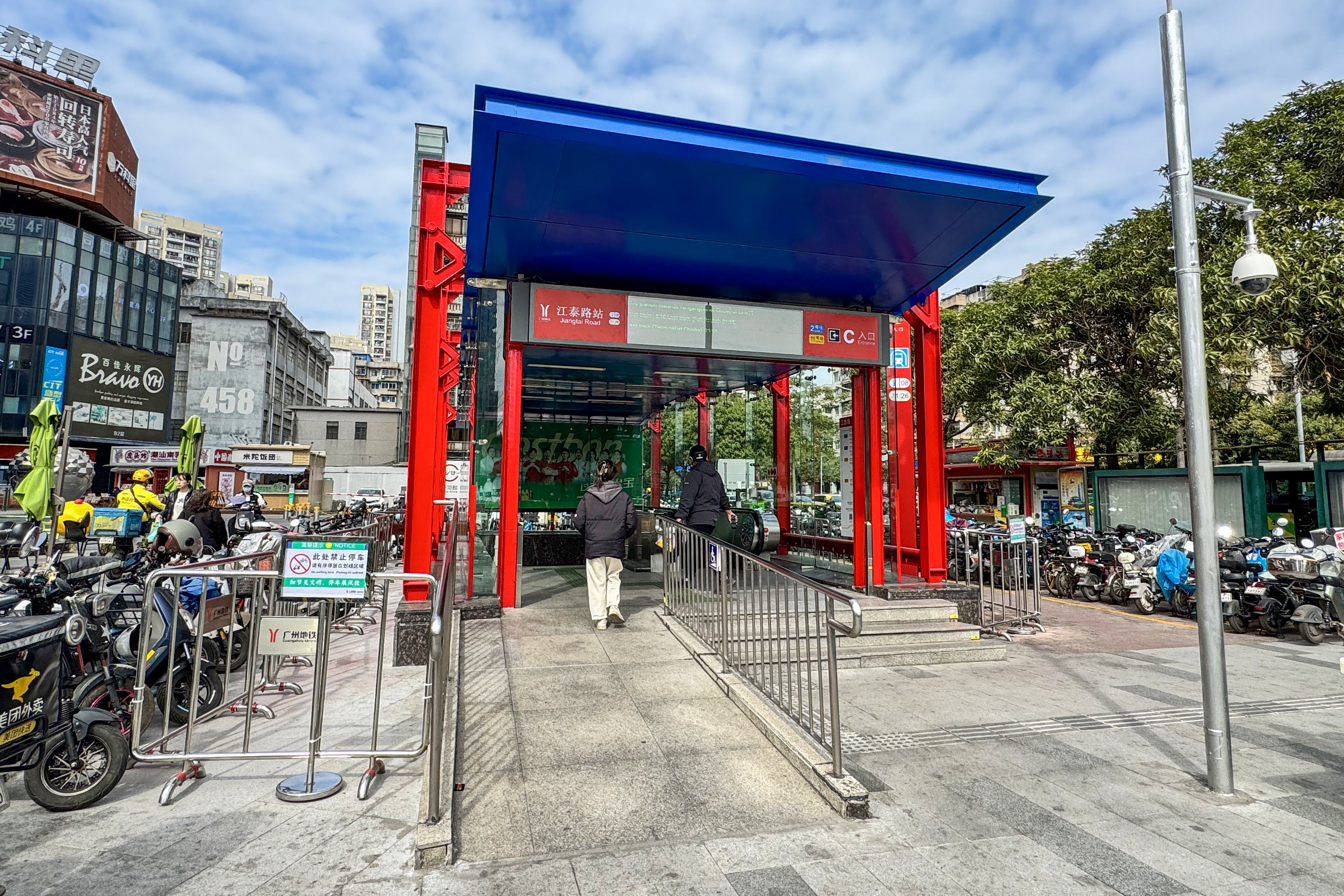
Entrance C

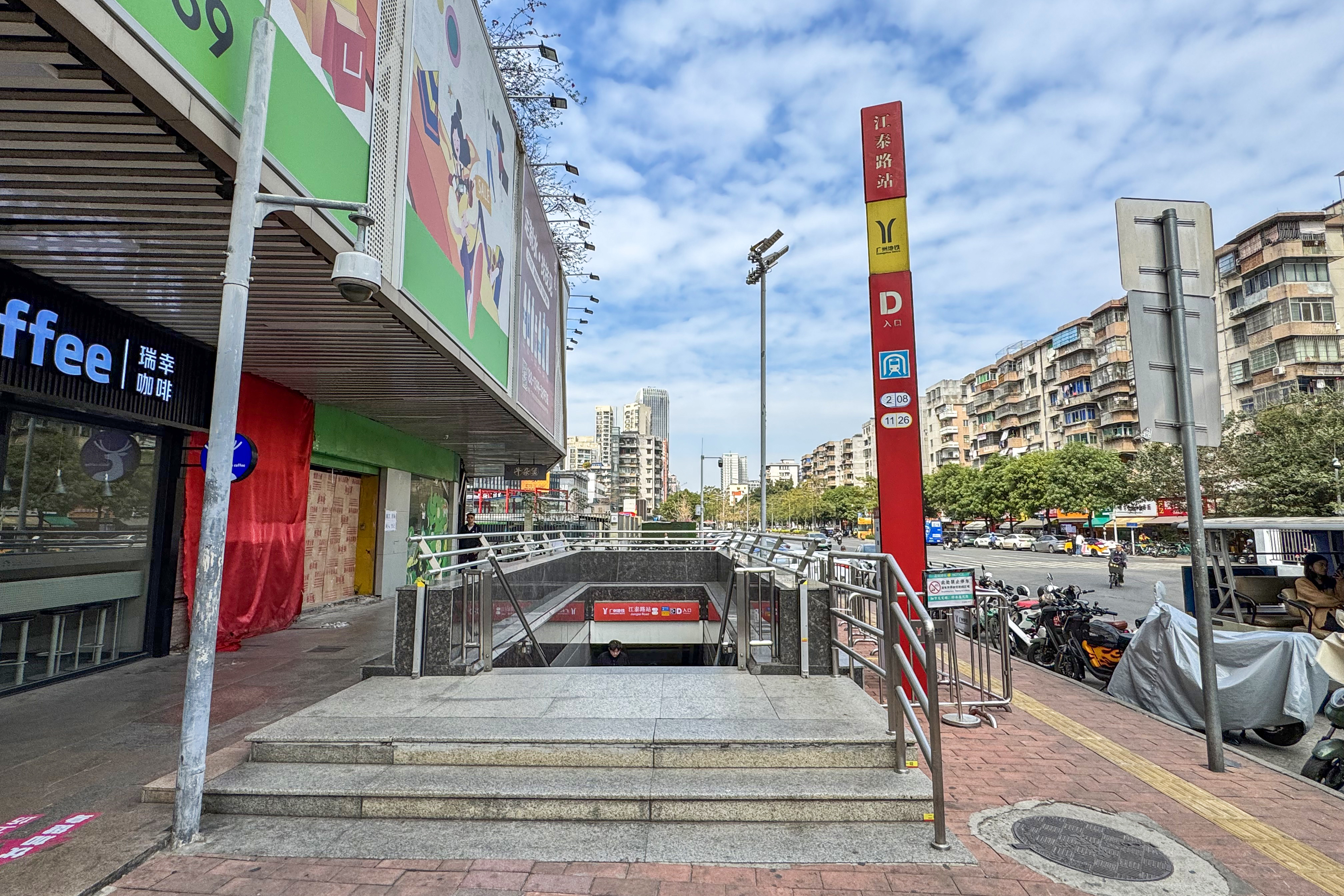
Entrance D

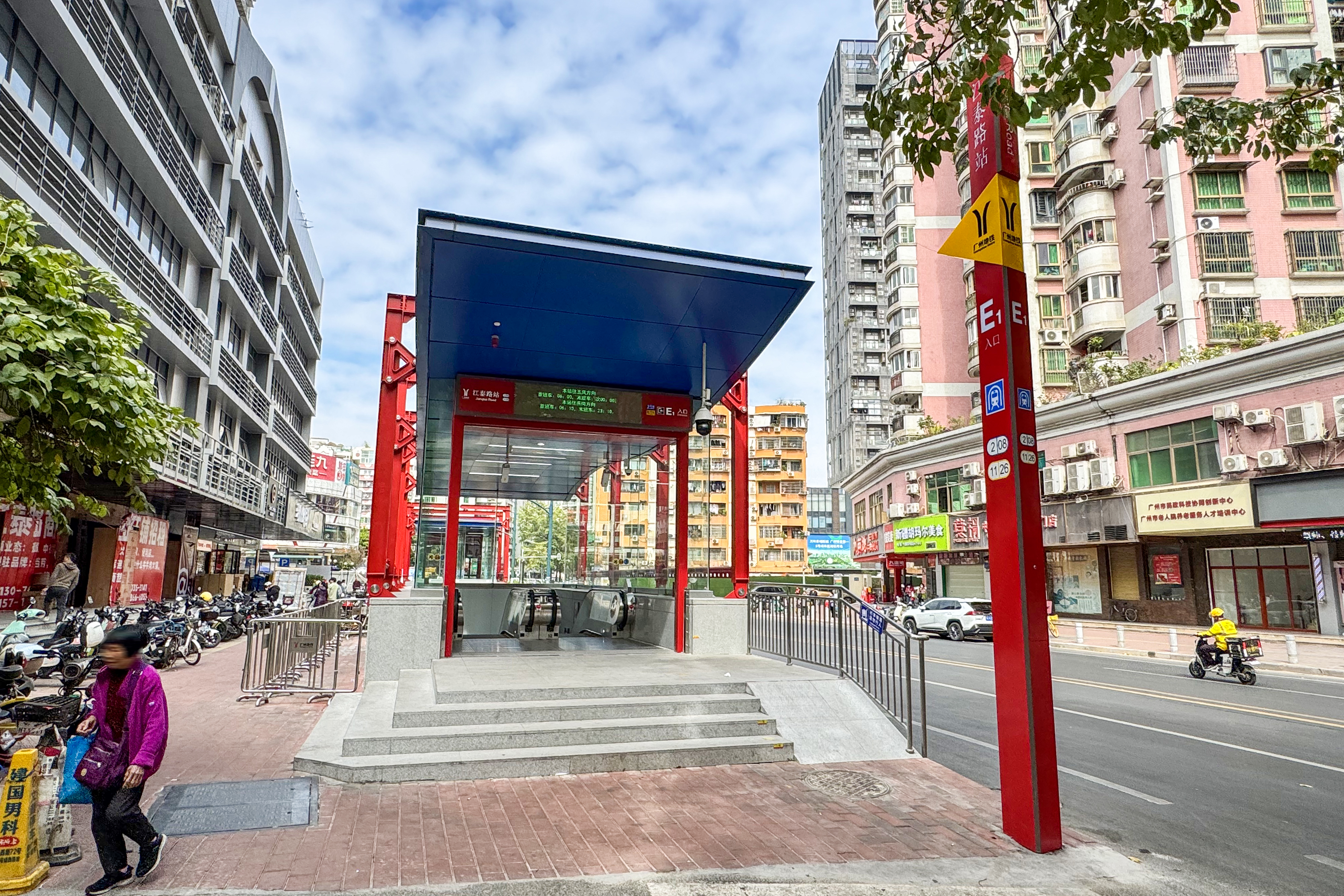
Entrance E1

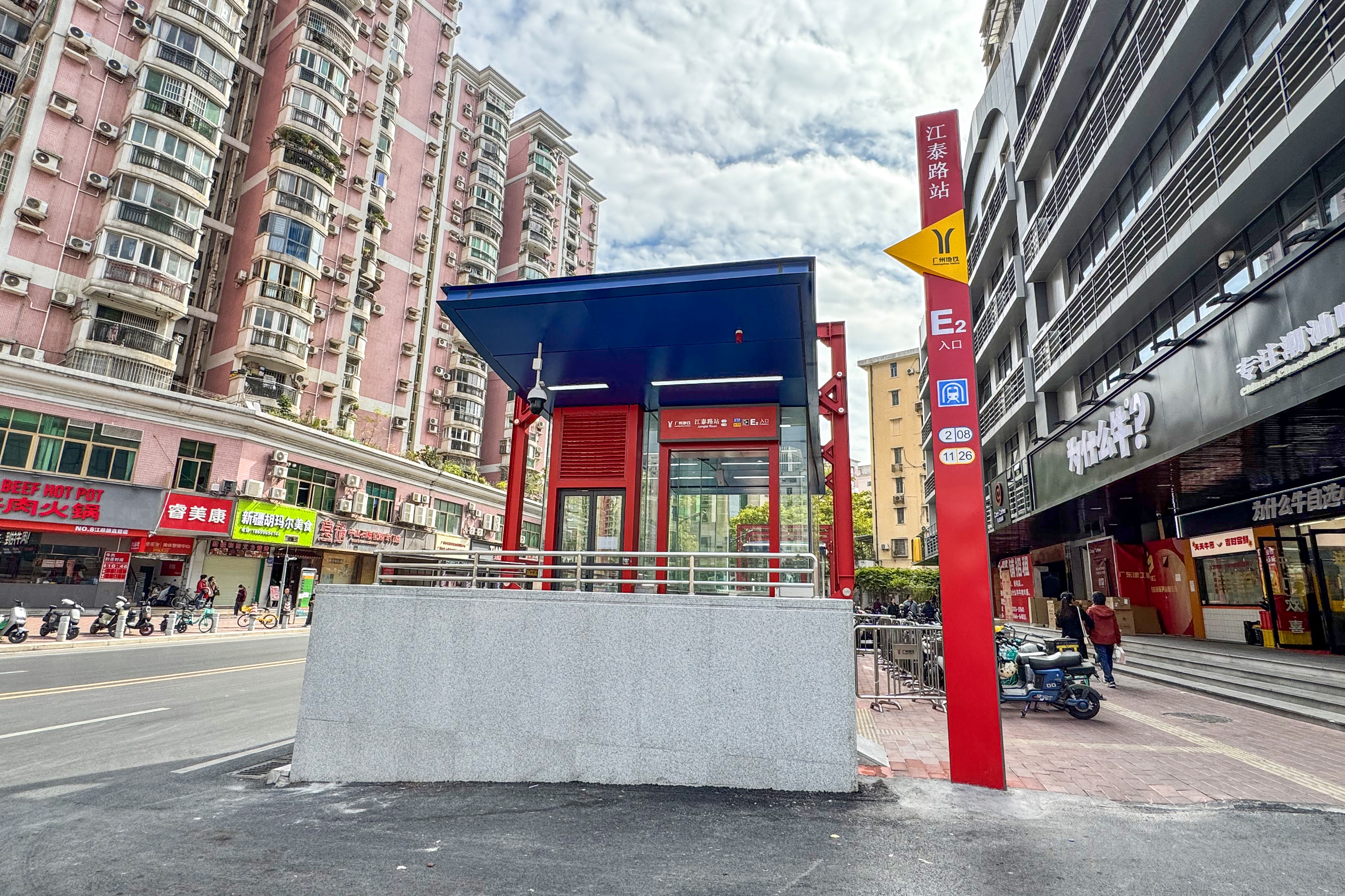
Entrance E2

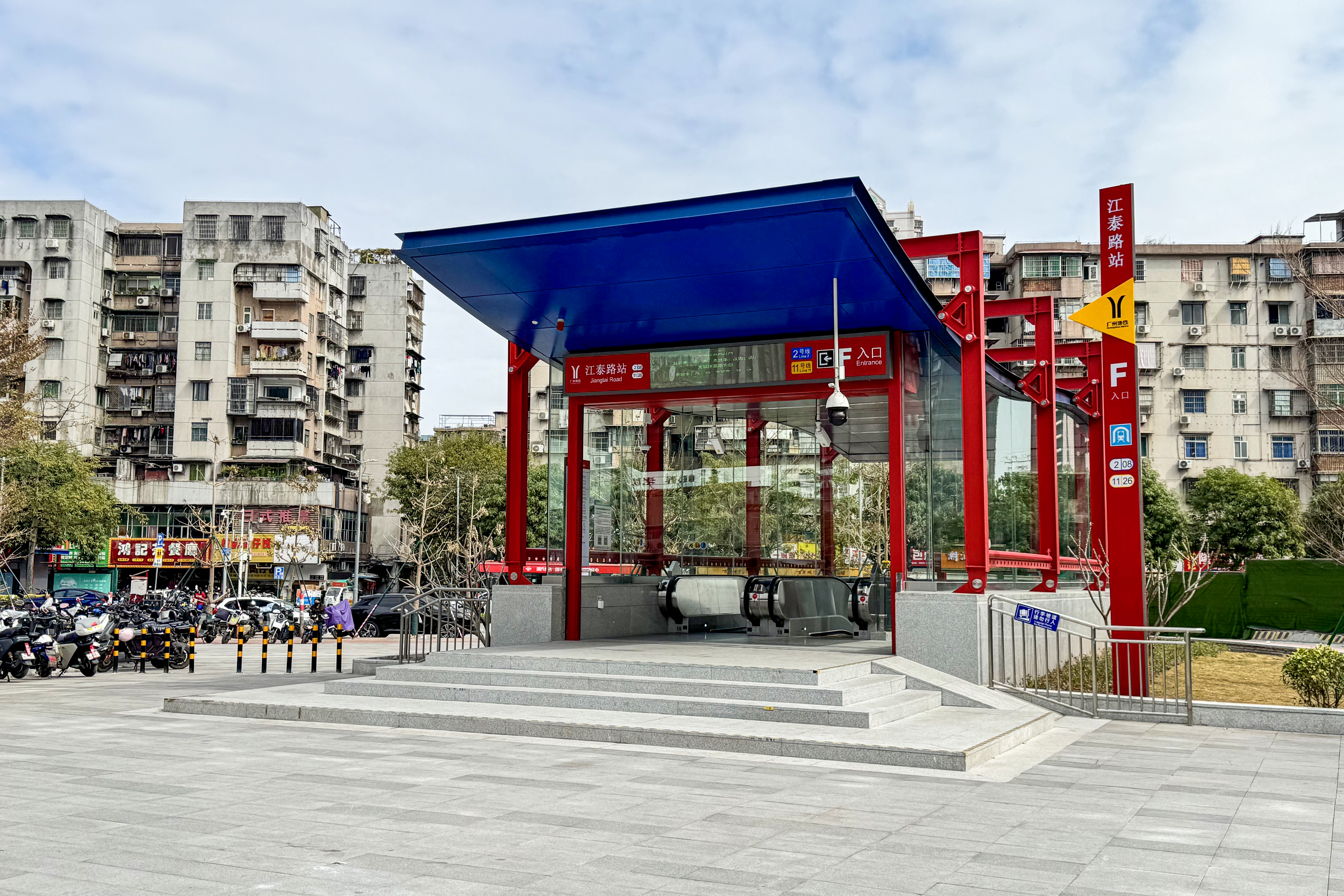
Entrance F

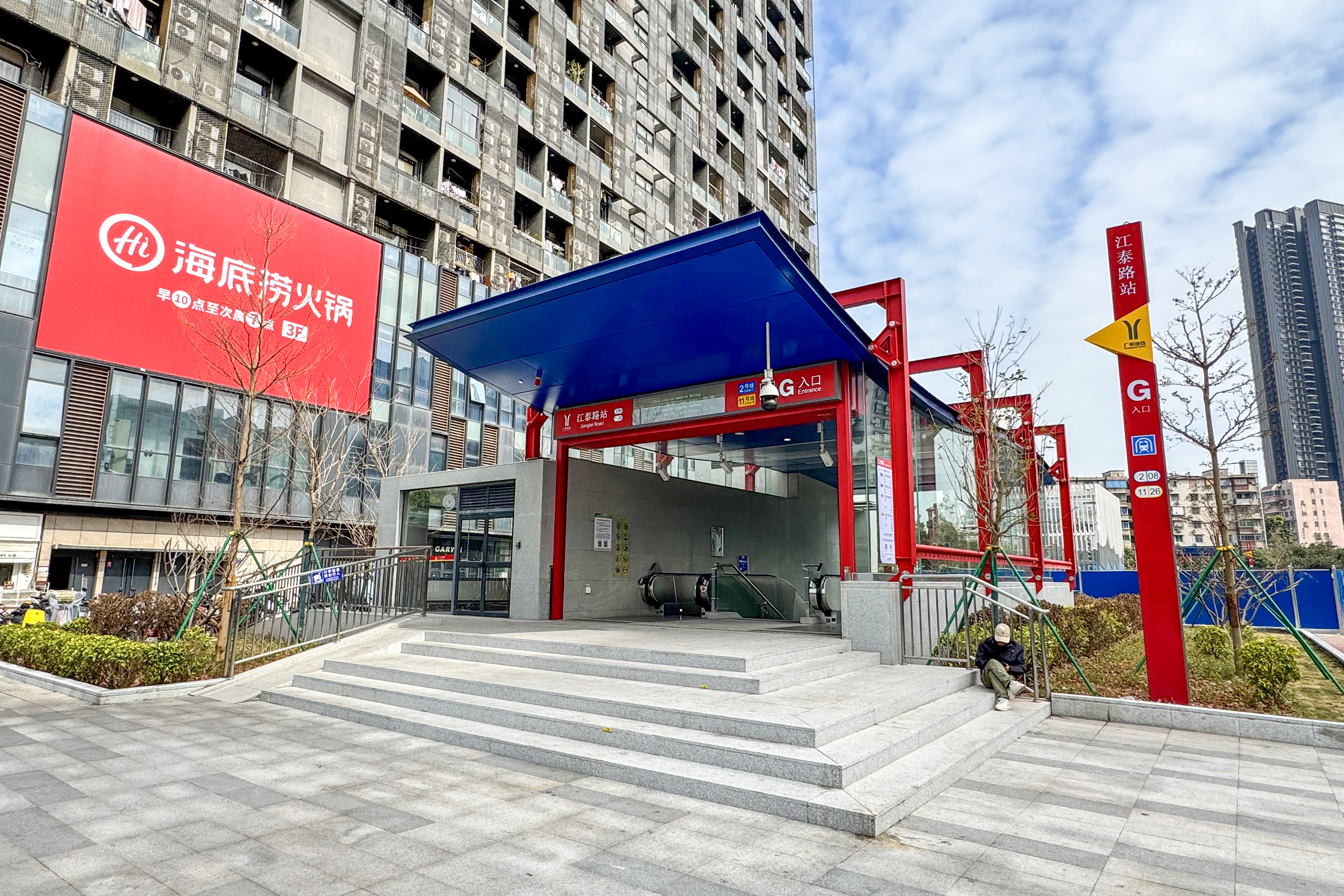
Entrance G

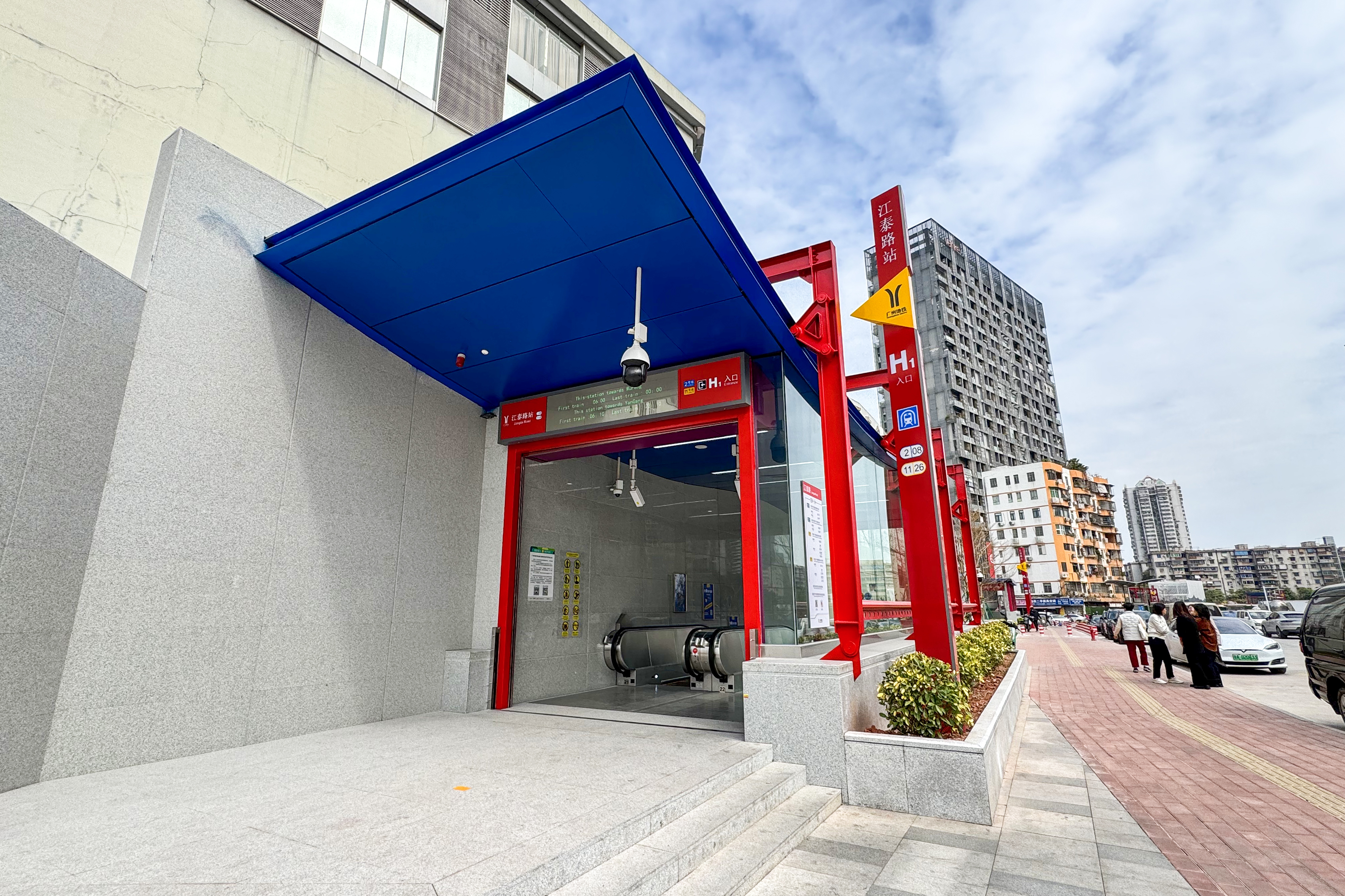
Entrance H1

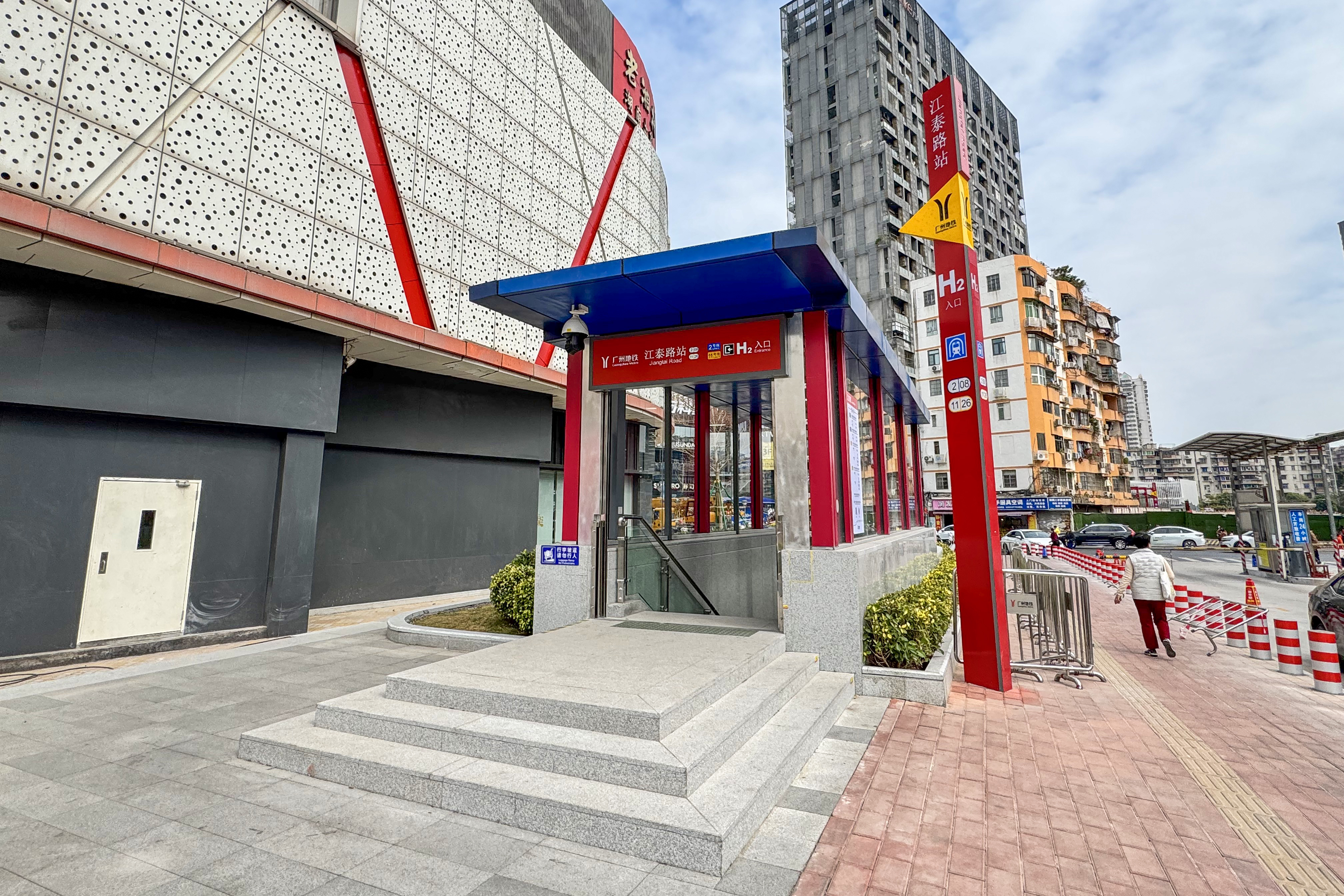
Entrance H2

== Gallery ==
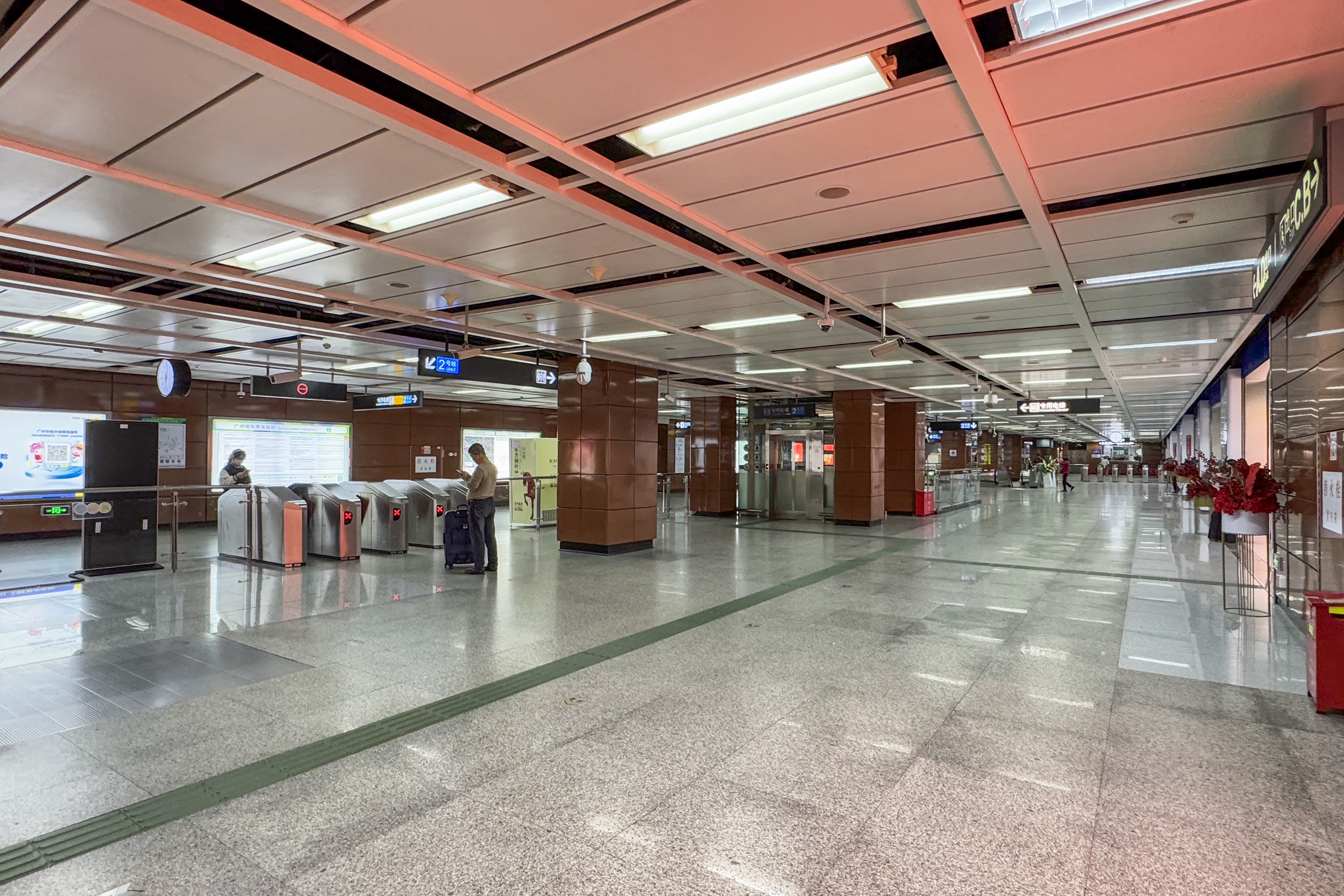
Line 2 concourse

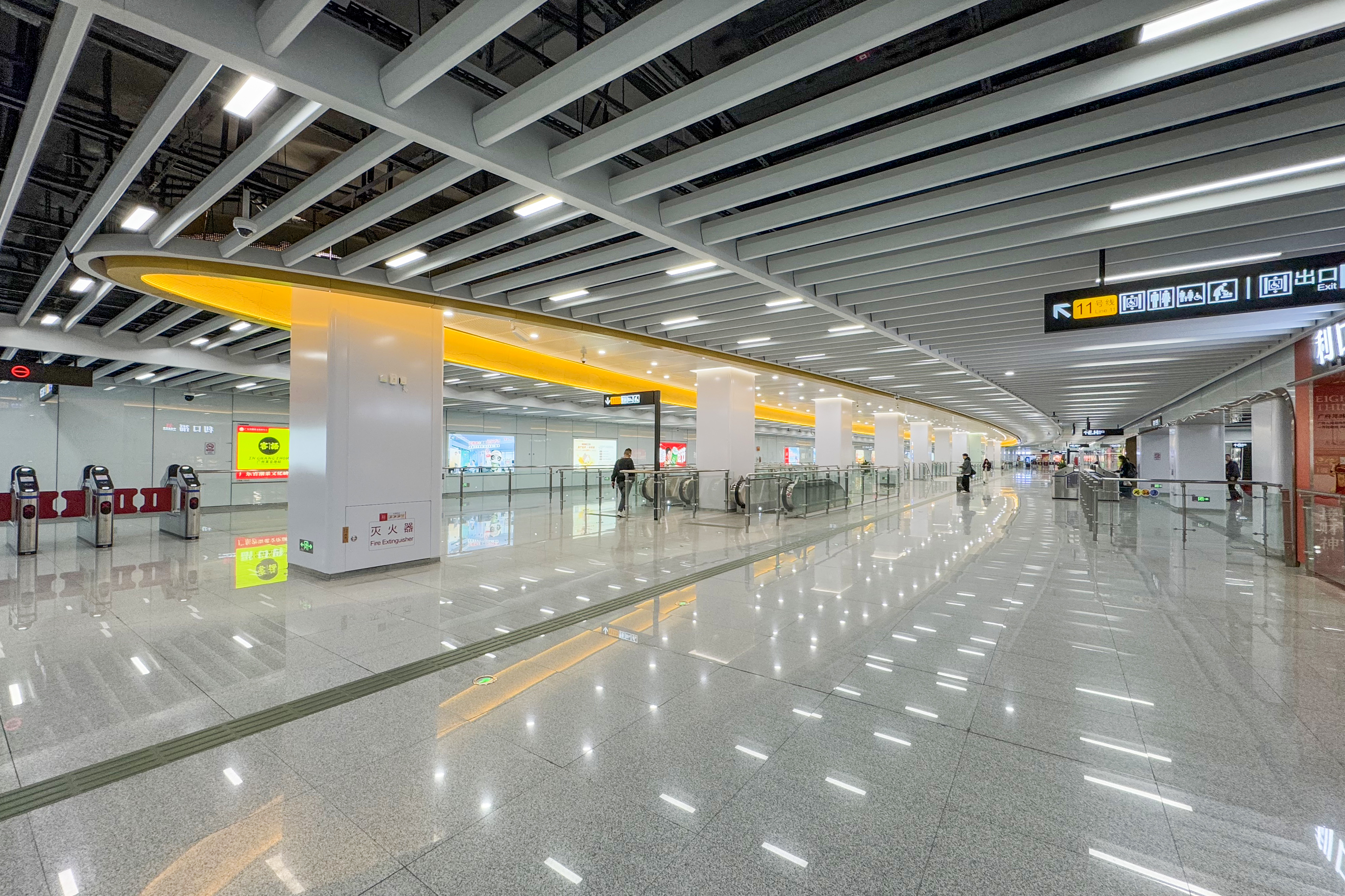
Line 11 concourse

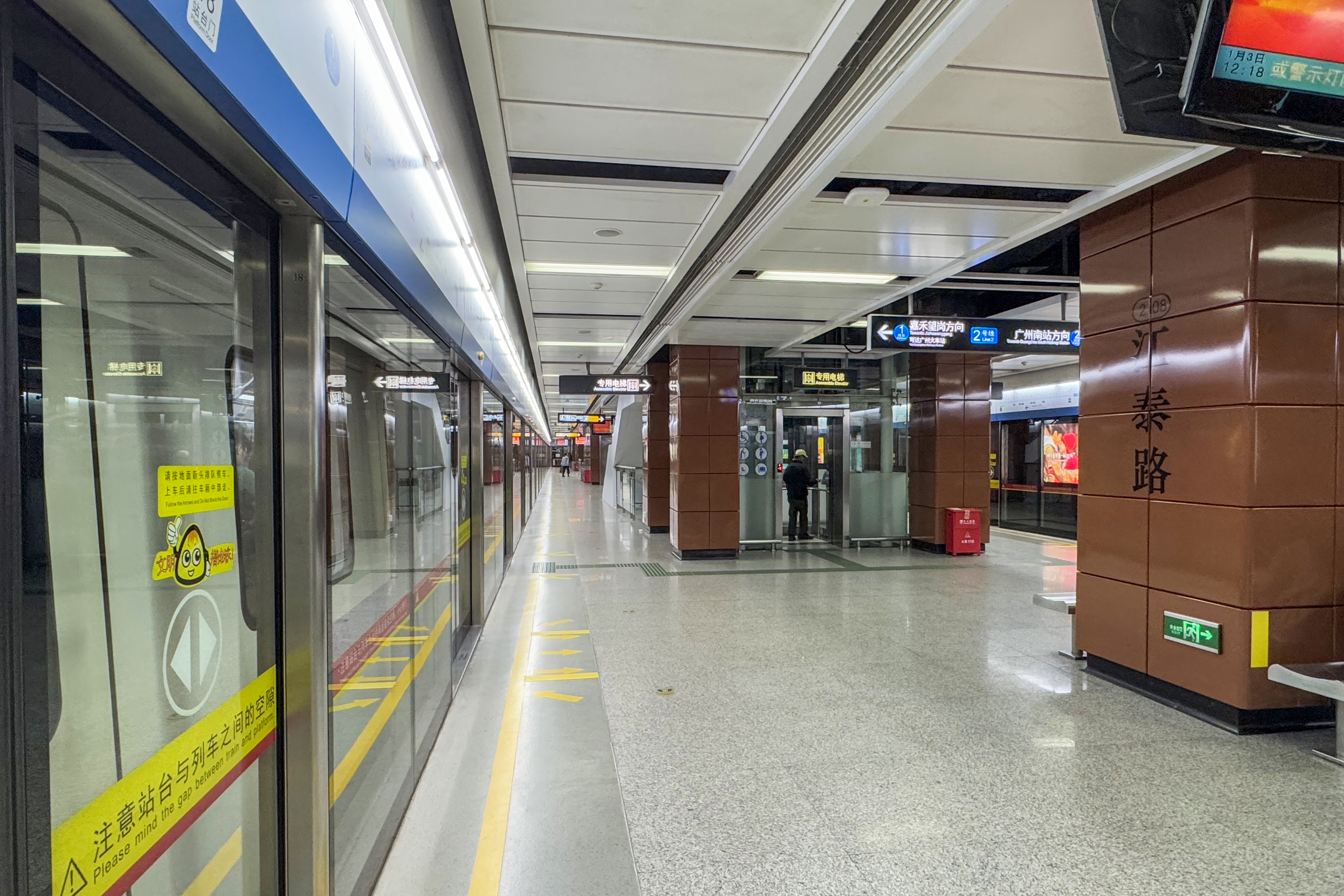
Line 2 platform view

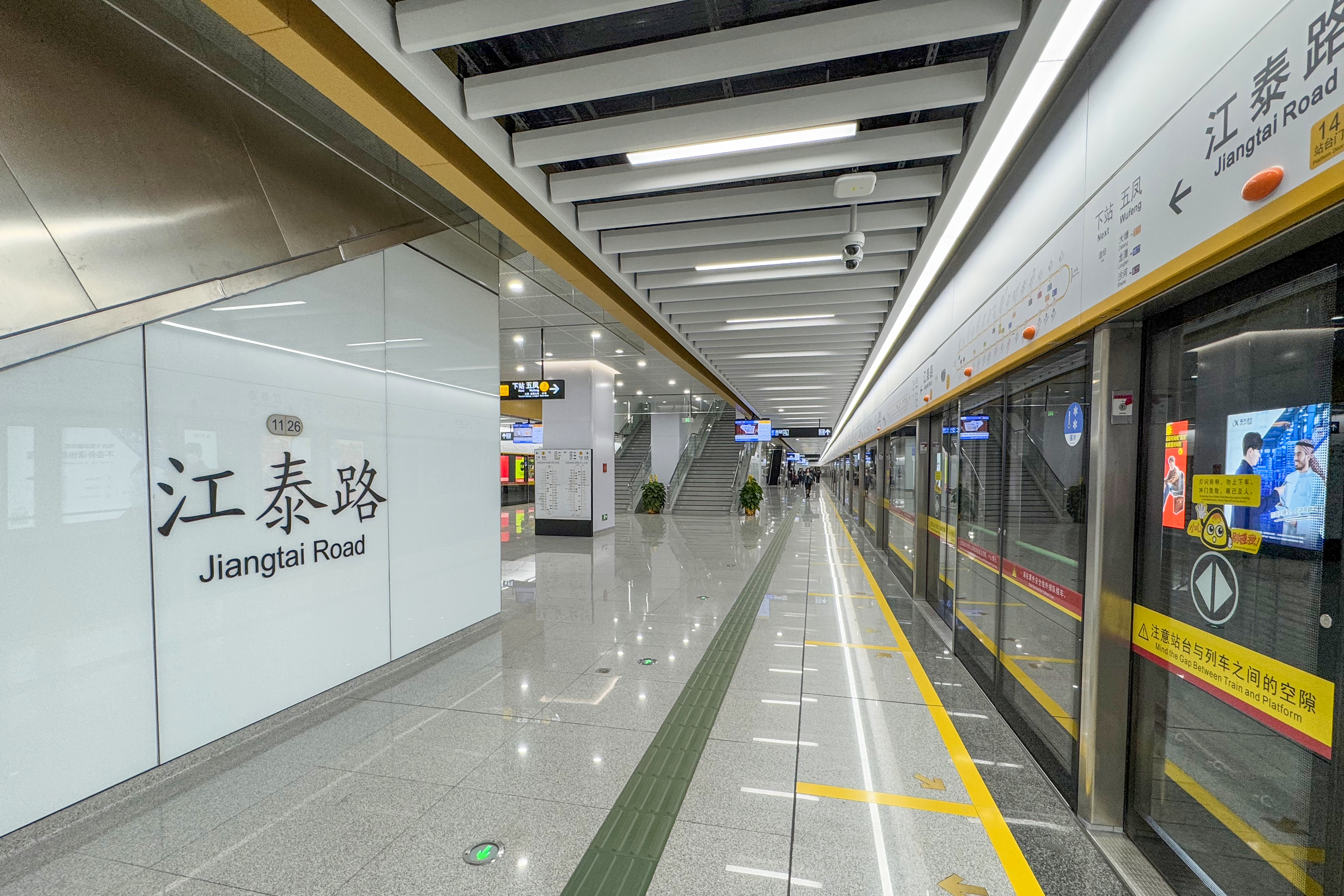
Line 11 platform

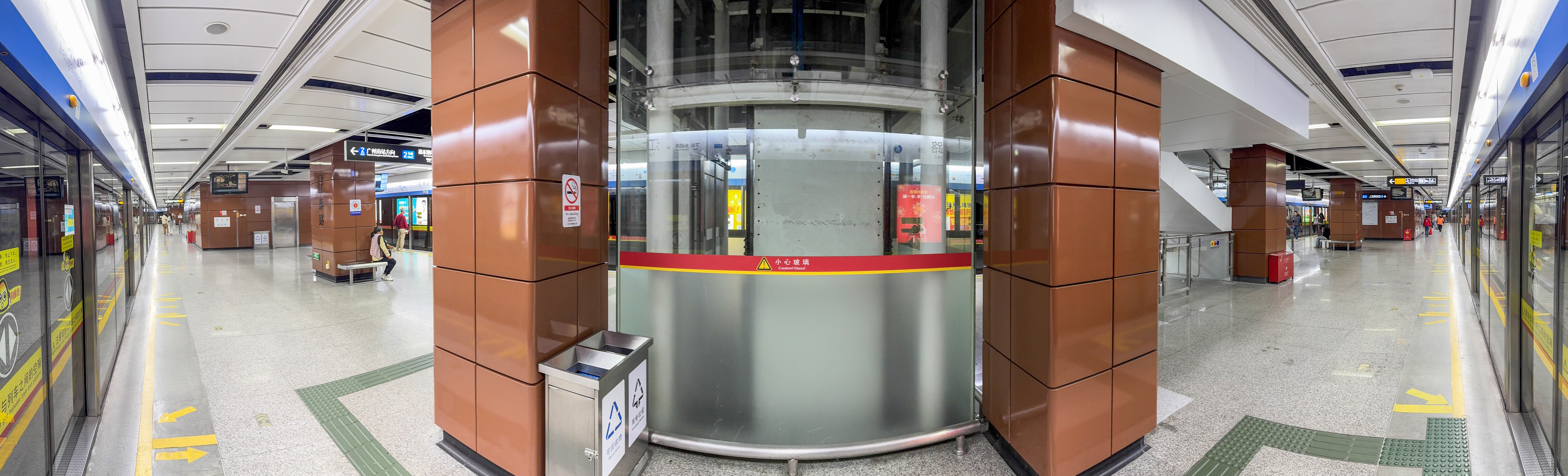
Line 2 platform panorama

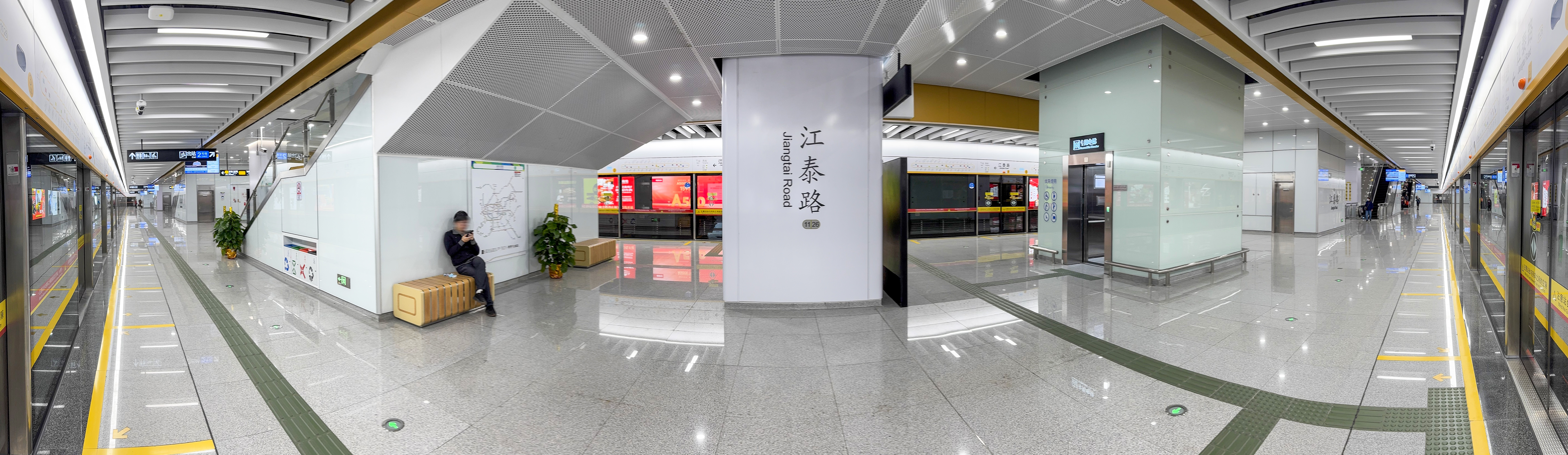
Line 11 platform panorama

== History ==
=== Construction ===
The main station structure of Line 11 started construction in January 2022, and was topped out on 29 May 2023.

In order to withstand the flow of passengers from Line 11, the station body of Line 2 was renovated on the eve of the opening of Line 11, and the Line 2 station converted the original staircase connecting the concourse to the platform into an escalator, and a new set of stairs was built in the middle of the concourse to connect to the platform. In addition, a passenger queueing space is set up in the Line 11 concourse before entering the transfer interface so that it can be used for transferring passengers from Line 11 during peak traffic restrictions.

=== Operation ===
On 28 September 2010, the station was officially put into use with the opening of the new Line 2 and Line 8.

When the station was first opened, it was called Jiangtai Lu in English. In 2022, the Office of the Foreign Affairs Commission of the Guangzhou Municipal Party Committee issued a new version of the "English Translation and Writing Specifications for Public Signs in Guangzhou (2022 Edition)", which requires the English naming of roads to be standardized. Thus, the English station name of the station will be changed to Jiangtai Road when Line 11 opens. Related materials have also been updated on the eve of the opening of Line 11. On 28 December 2024, the Line 11 station was put into use.

== Neighboring buildings ==
- Jiangnan Dadao South Public Transport Interchange
- Xiaoyuan Secondary School
