= Changgang station =

Guangzhou Metro interchange station

Coordinates: 23.089878°N 113.278356°E

Changgang 昌岗
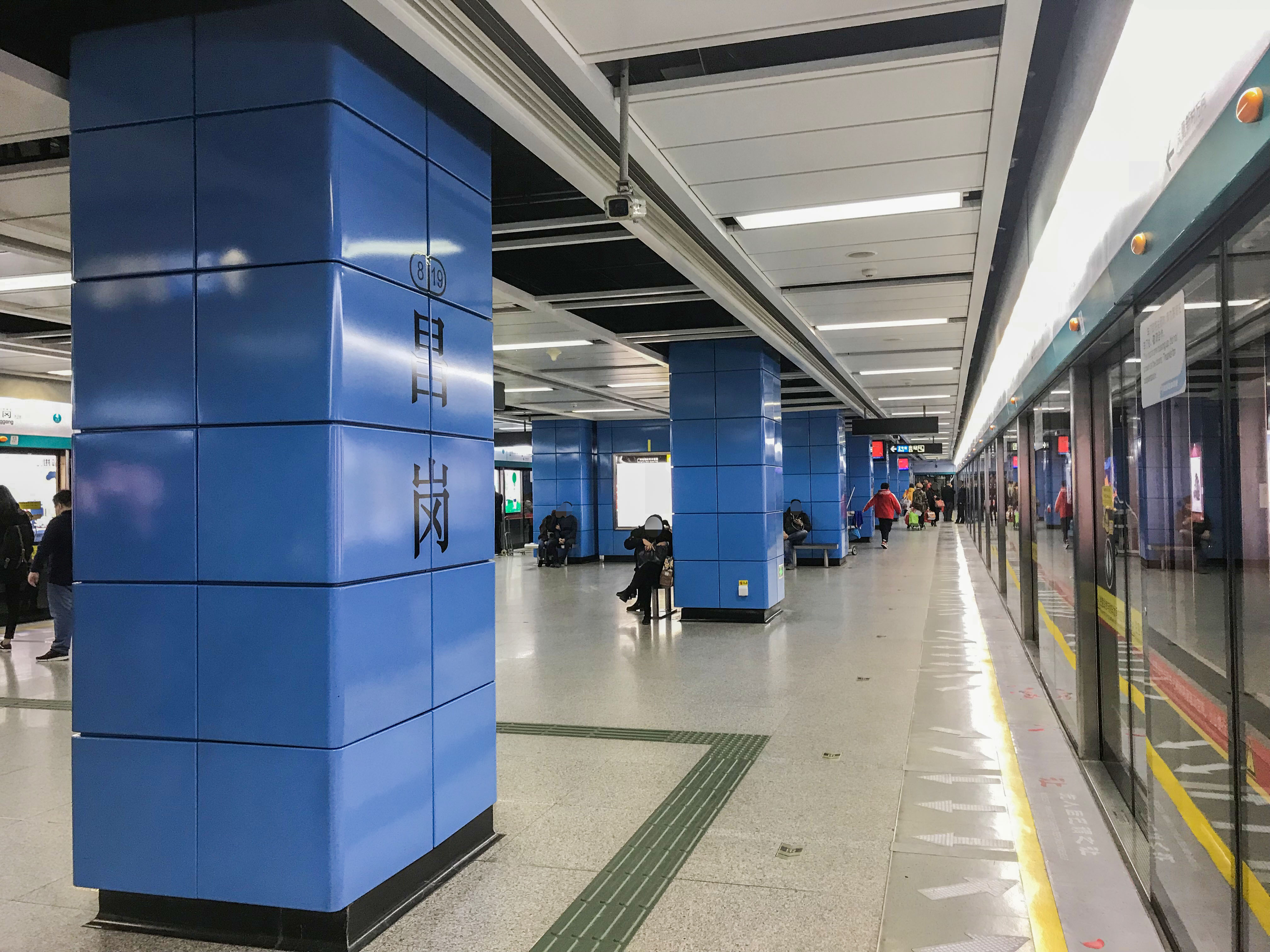
- Platform 3 (Line 8 towards Jiaoxin)

Chinese name
- Simplified Chinese: 昌岗站
- Traditional Chinese: 昌崗站
Transcriptions
Standard Mandarin
- Hanyu Pinyin: Chānggǎng Zhàn
Yue: Cantonese
- Yale Romanization: Chēunggōng Jaahm
- Jyutping: Coeng1gong1 Zaam6
- Hong Kong Romanization: Cheung Kong station

General information
- Location: Haizhu District, Guangzhou, Guangdong; China
- Operated by: Guangzhou Metro Co. Ltd.
- Lines: Line 2; Line 8
- Platforms: 4 (2 island platforms)
- Tracks: 4

Construction
- Structure type: Underground
- Accessible: Yes

Other information
- Station code: 209 819

History
- Opened: 25 September 2010; 15 years ago

Services
Preceding station	Guangzhou Metro	Following station
Jiangtai Road towards Guangzhou South Railway Station	Line 2	Jiangnanxi towards Jiahewanggang
Baogang Dadao towards Jiaoxin	Line 8	Xiaogang towards Wanshengwei
Location

Changgang Station (simplified Chinese: 昌岗站; traditional Chinese: 昌崗站; Jyutping: coeng1 gong1 zaam6; Cantonese Yale: Chēunggōng Jaahm) is an interchange station between Line 2 and Line 8 of the Guangzhou Metro. The underground station is located at the intersection of Changgang Road and Jiangnan Avenue in Haizhu District. It started operation on 25 September 2010.

At its first operation day of the station, the number of passenger frequency was over 220,000, so traffic control was needed at the platforms of Line 2.

== Station layout ==
G	-	Exits A, B, C1, C2, D-F
L1; Reserved Zone	-	Reserved for Civil Works
L2; Concourse	Lobby	Ticket Machines, Customer Service, Shops, Police Station, Safety Facilities
L2; Concourse		Pedestrian subway
L3; Platforms	Platform 3	8 towards Jiaoxin (Baogang Dadao)
L3; Platforms	Island Platform, doors will open on the left
L3; Platforms	Platform 4	8 towards Wanshengwei Station (Xiaogang)
L4; Platforms	Platform 2	2 towards Guangzhou South Railway Station (Jiangtai Lu)
L4; Platforms	Island Platform, doors will open on the left
L4; Platforms	Platform 1	2 towards Jiahewanggang (Jiangnanxi)

== Gallery ==
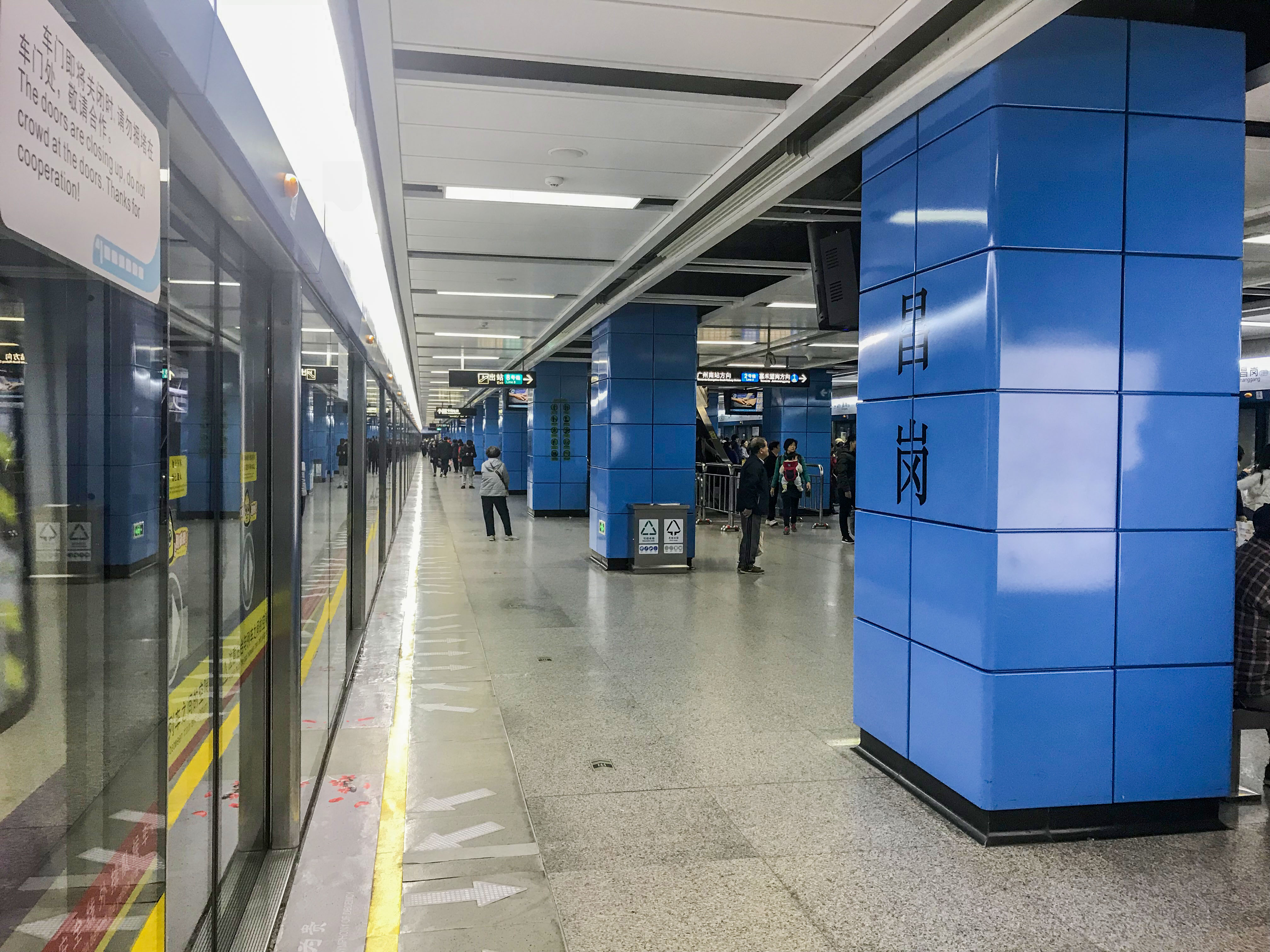
Line 2 platform

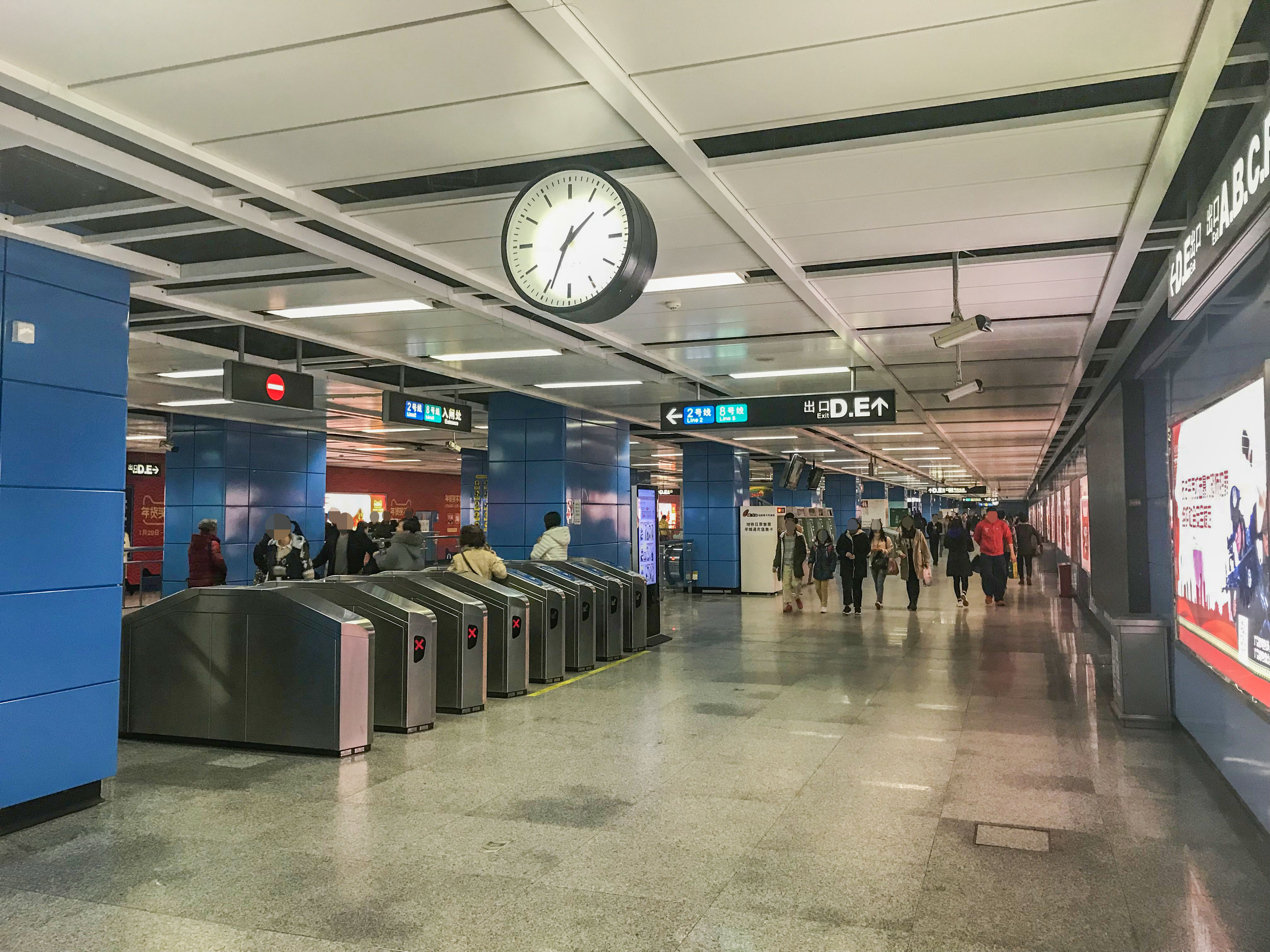
Line 8 concourse

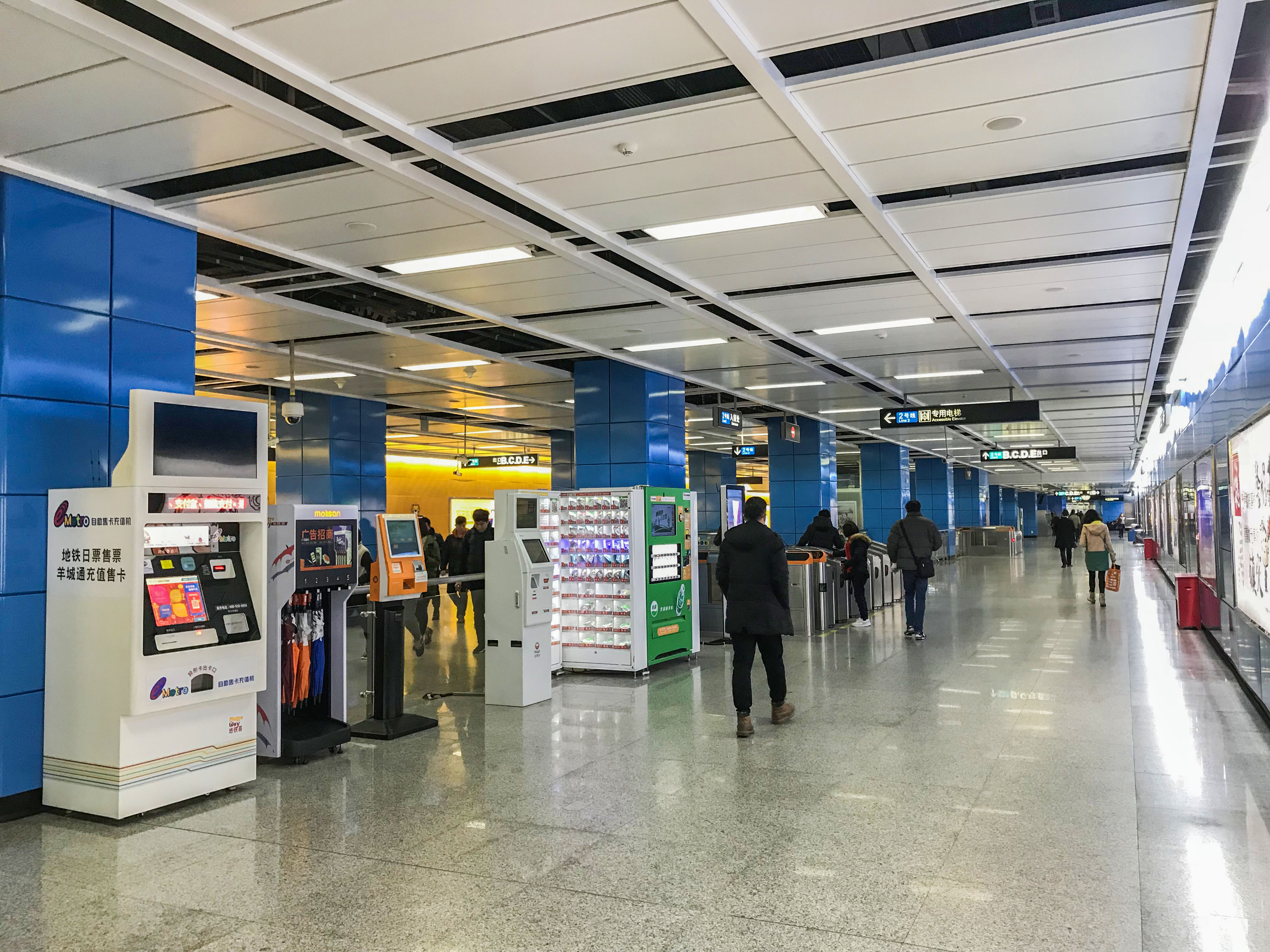
Line 2 concourse

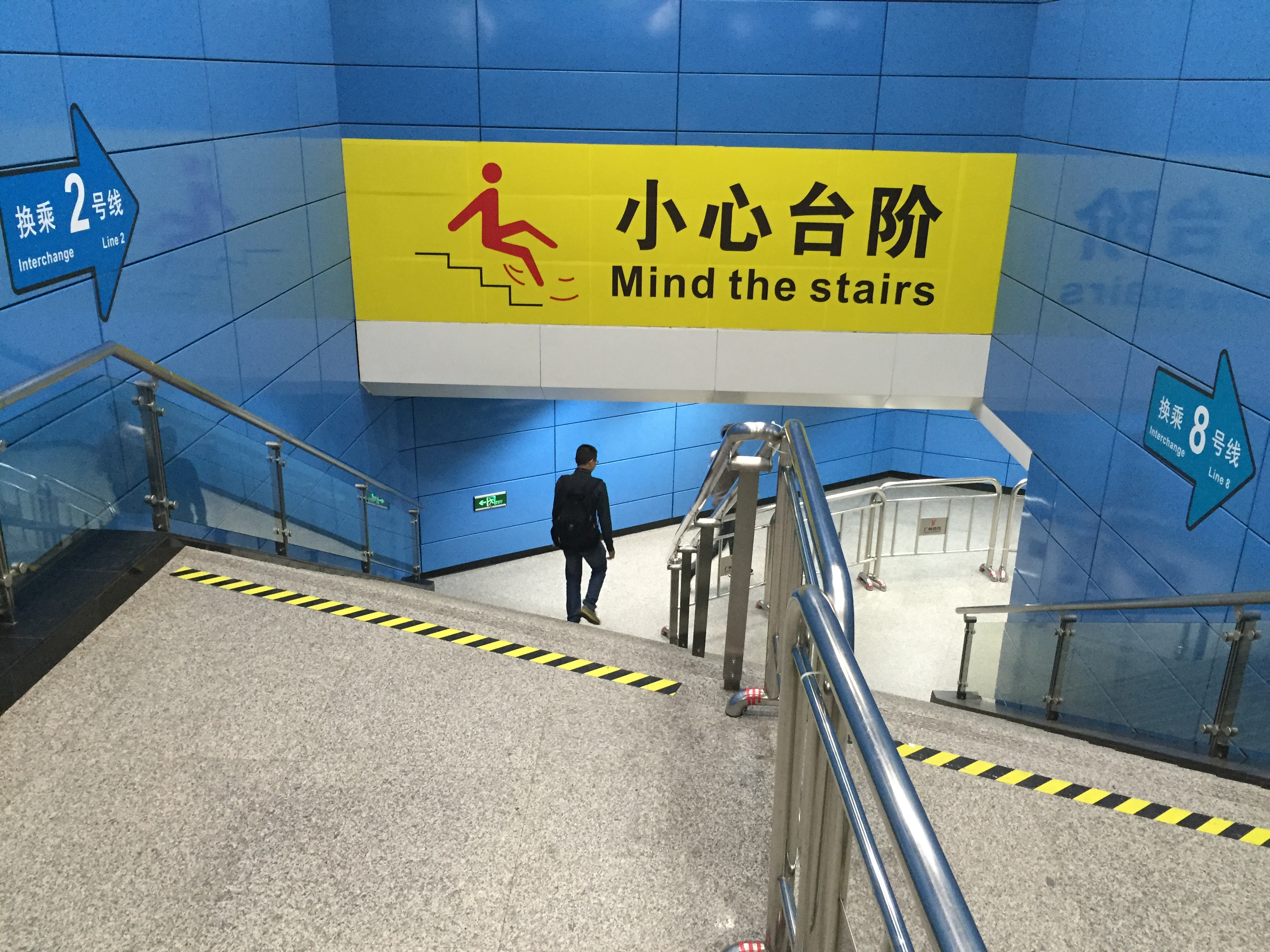
Transfer stairs

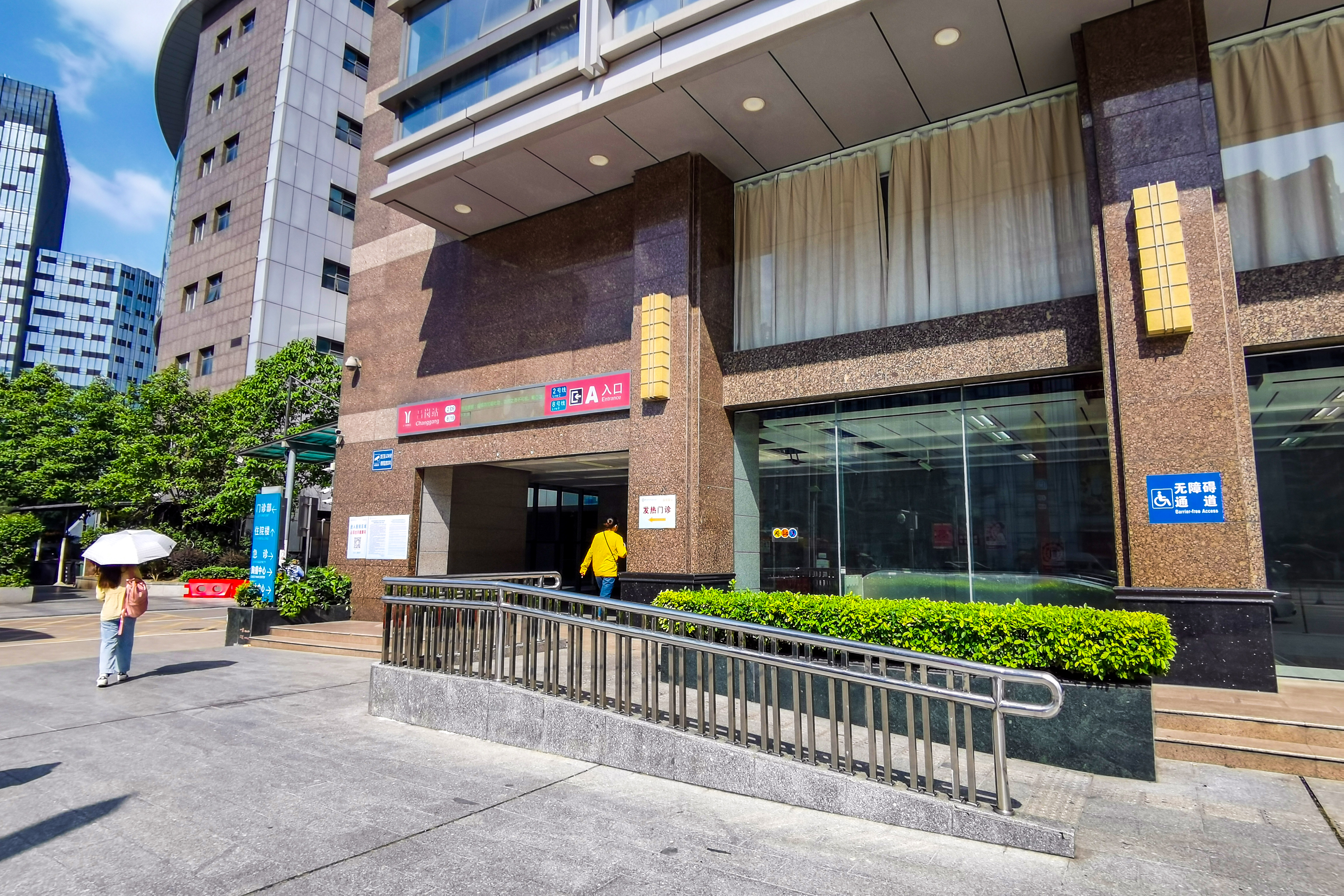
Exit A

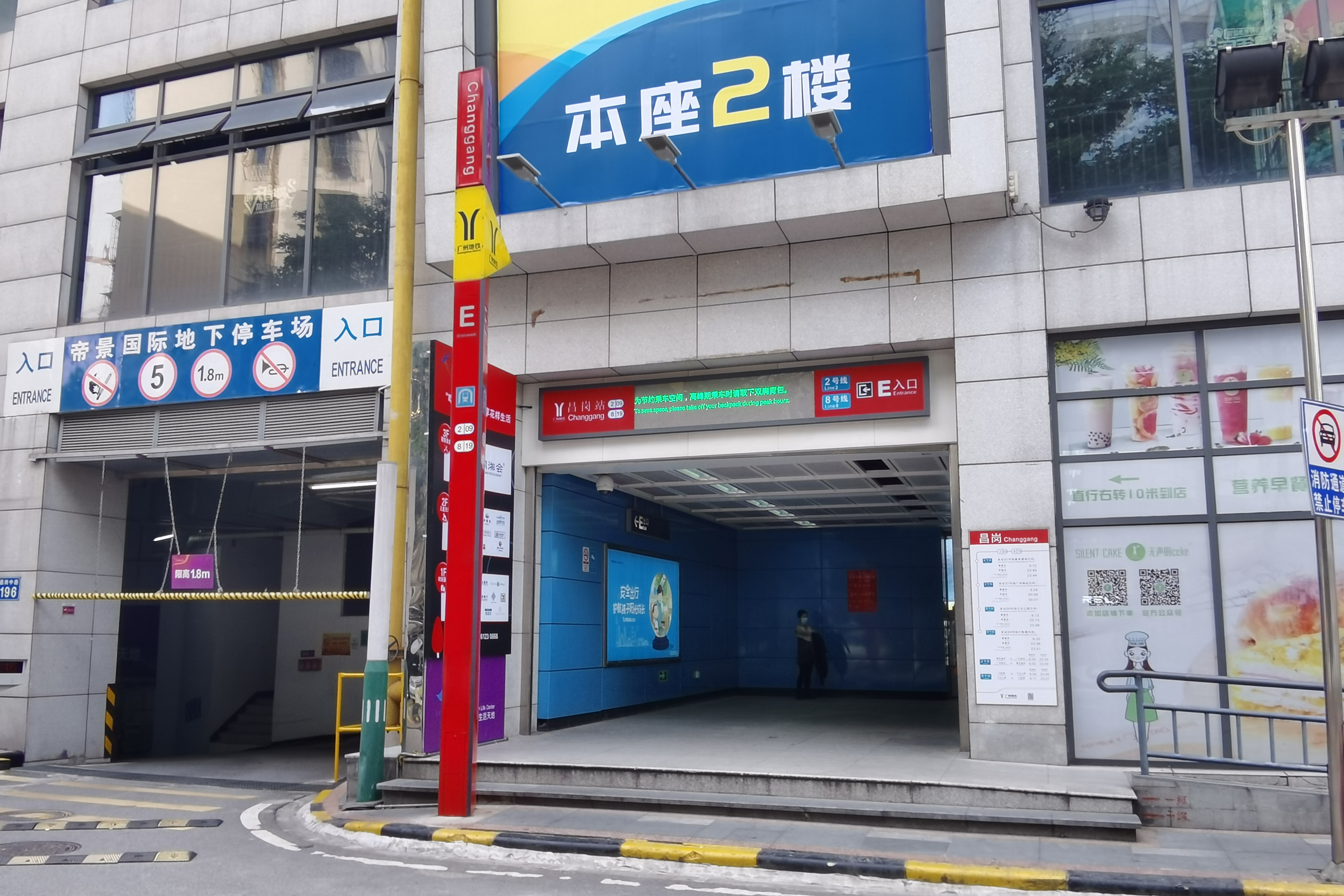
Exit E

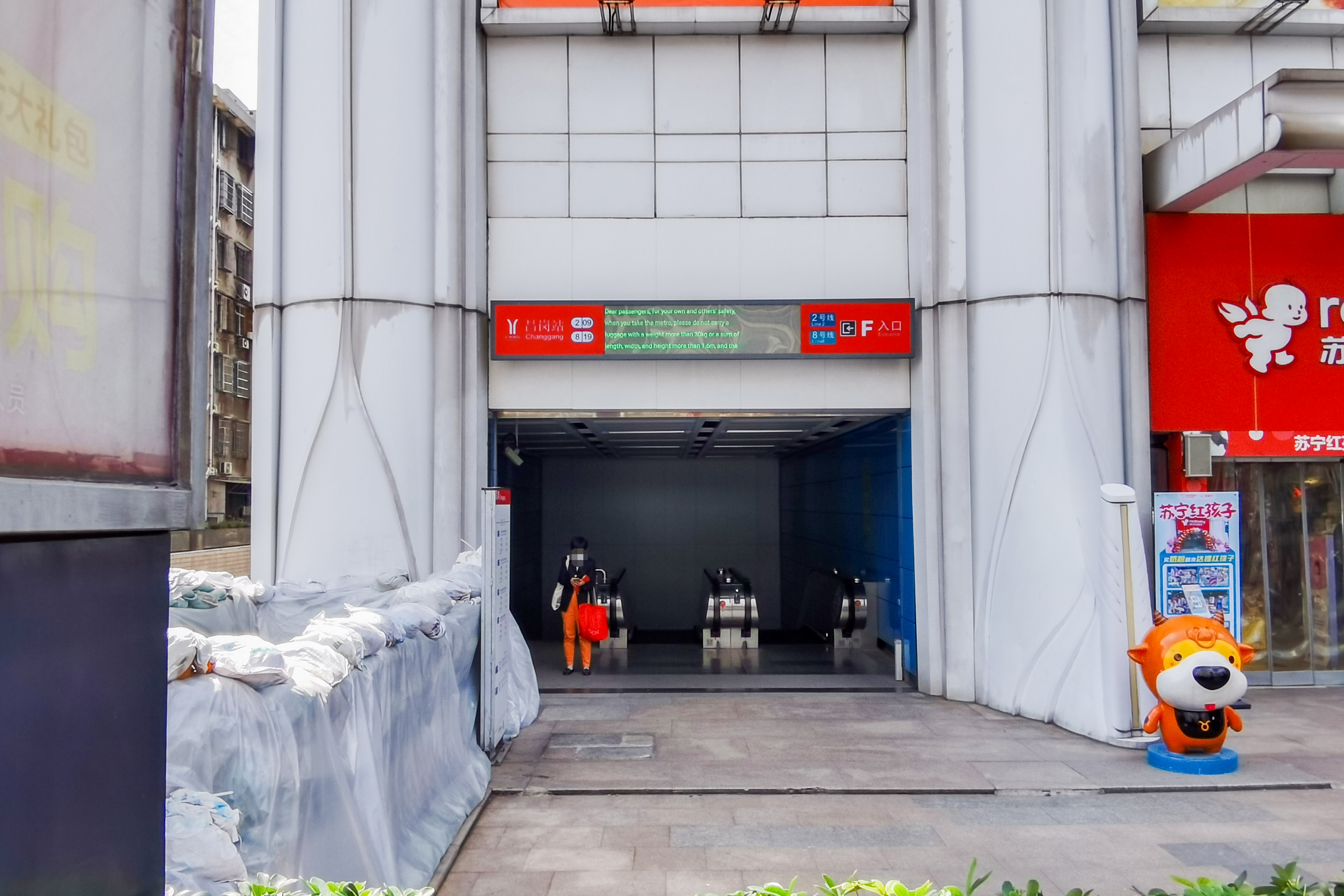
Exit F
