= Baiyunhu Depot =

Chinese rail yard

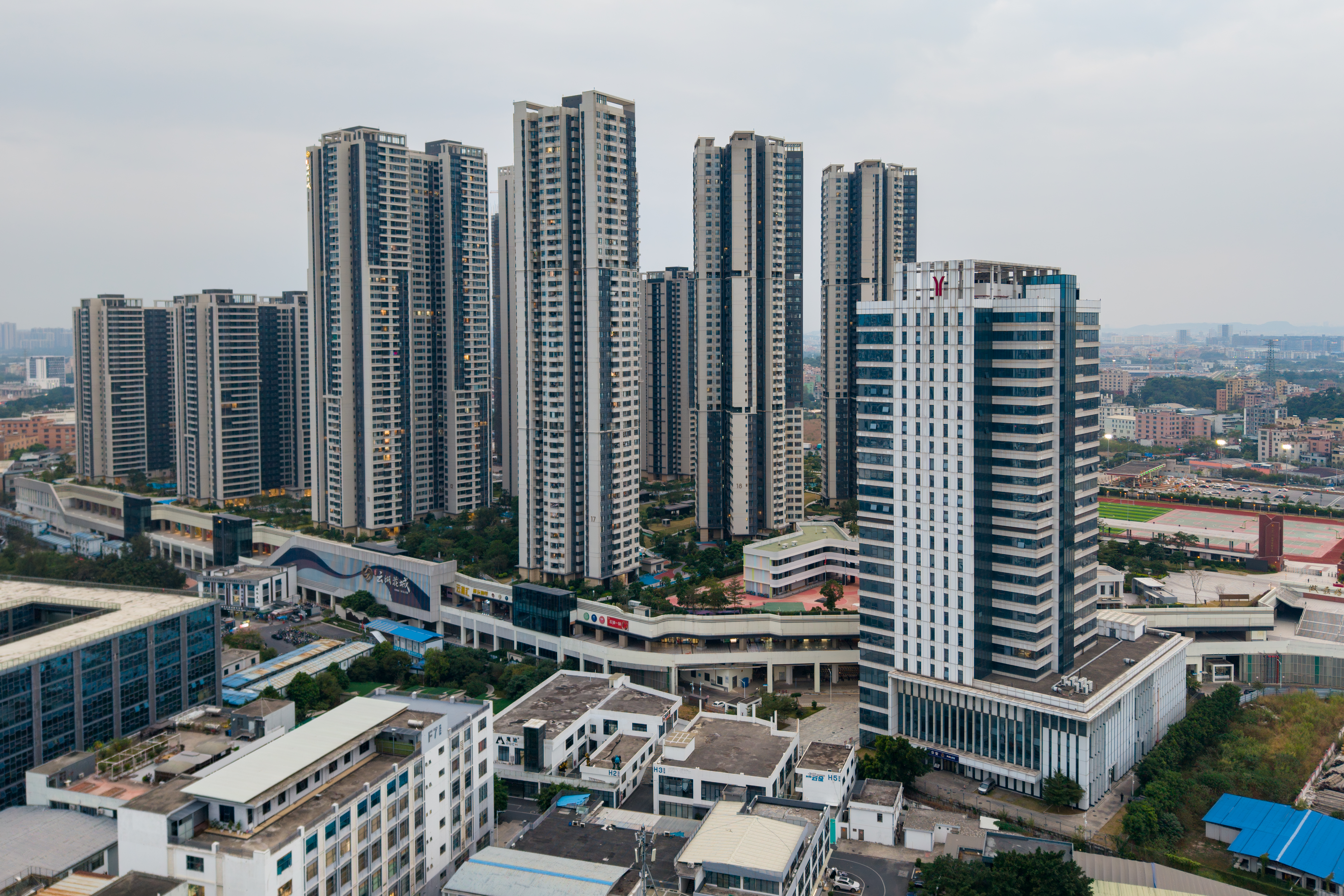
View of Baiyunhu Depot

Baiyunhu Depot (simplified Chinese: 白云湖车辆段; traditional Chinese: 白雲湖車輛段) is a rail yard serving the Guangzhou Metro. It is located in the village of Yagang in Baiyun District, within Guangzhou, Guangdong, China. The Baiyunhu Depot is east of Tinggang Station of Line 8 and the Hubin South Road Tunnel passes beneath the site.

Construction began in May 2013 and was completed by 21 March 2020. It has a total construction area of 283,000m^{2} and is the site of parking, cleaning, daily inspection, maintenance, and repair of trains operating on Guangzhou Metro Line 8. Starting 15 August 2020, the depot became the location for Line 8's dispatch and maintenance operations due to the renovation of Chisha Depot.
