= Xiaoping station =

Metro station in Guangzhou, China

Xiaoping 小坪
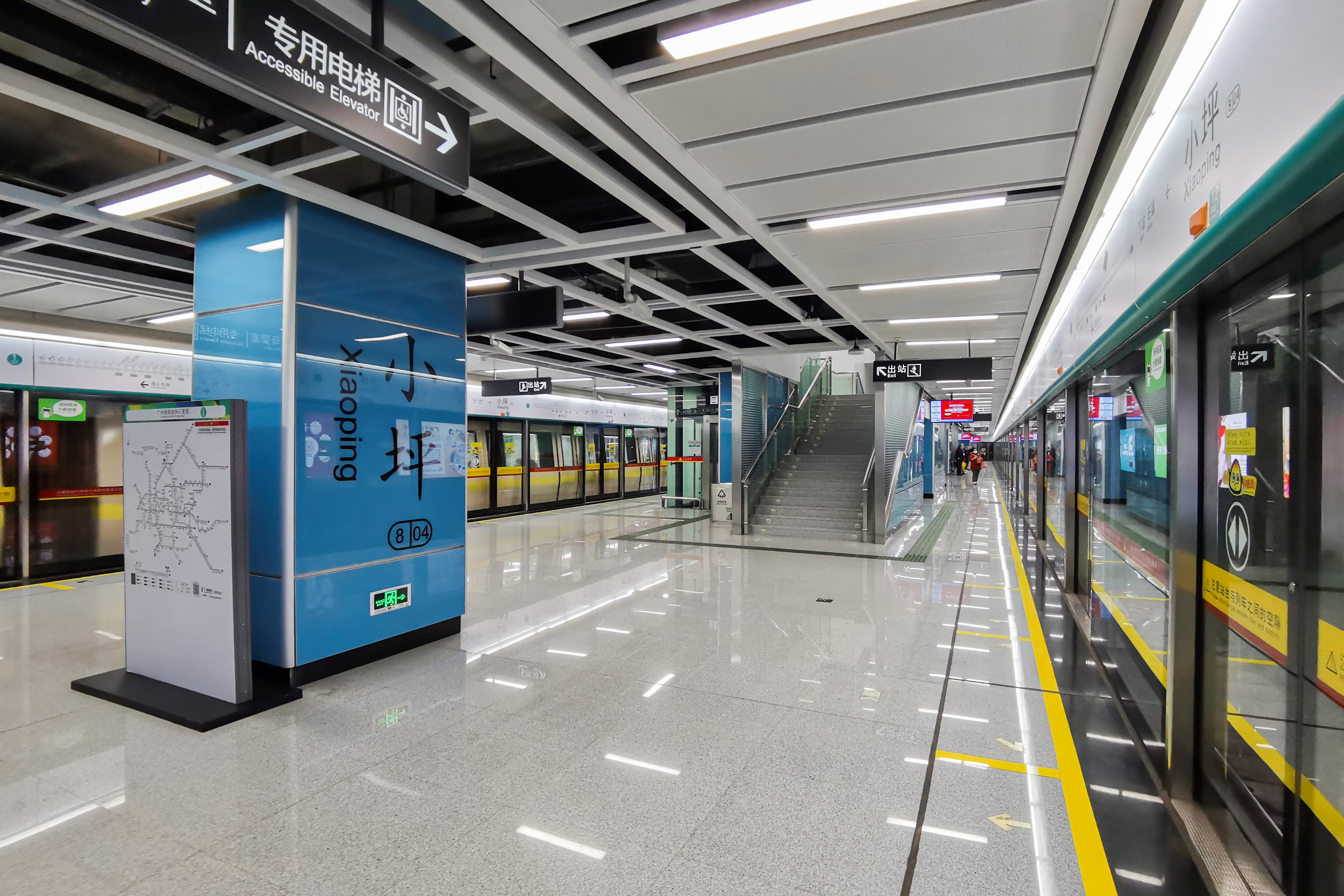
- Platform

Chinese name
- Simplified Chinese: 小坪站
- Traditional Chinese: 小坪站
Transcriptions

General information
- Location: Shicha Road, Jinbi South Road, Baiyun District, Guangzhou, Guangdong; China
- Coordinates: 23.2025694°N 113.2377083°E
- Operated by: Guangzhou Metro Co. Ltd.
- Line: Line 8
- Platforms: 2 (1 island platform)
- Tracks: 2

Construction
- Structure type: Underground
- Accessible: Yes

Other information
- Station code: 804

History
- Opened: 26 November 2020; 5 years ago

Services
Preceding station	Guangzhou Metro	Following station
Shijing towards Jiaoxin	Line 8	Shitan towards Wanshengwei
Location

Xiaoping Station (Chinese: 小坪站; Jyutping: siu2 ping4 zaam6) is a railway station of Guangzhou Metro Line 8, located at Shicha Road, Baiyun District, Guangzhou, Guangdong, China. The station opened on November 26, 2020 with the opening of the northern extension of Line 8.

The station has an underground island platform. Platform 1 is for trains towards Jiaoxin, whilst platform 2 is for trains towards Wanshengwei. There are 2 exits, lettered B and G. Exit B is accessible. Both exits are located on Shicha Road.

== Gallery ==
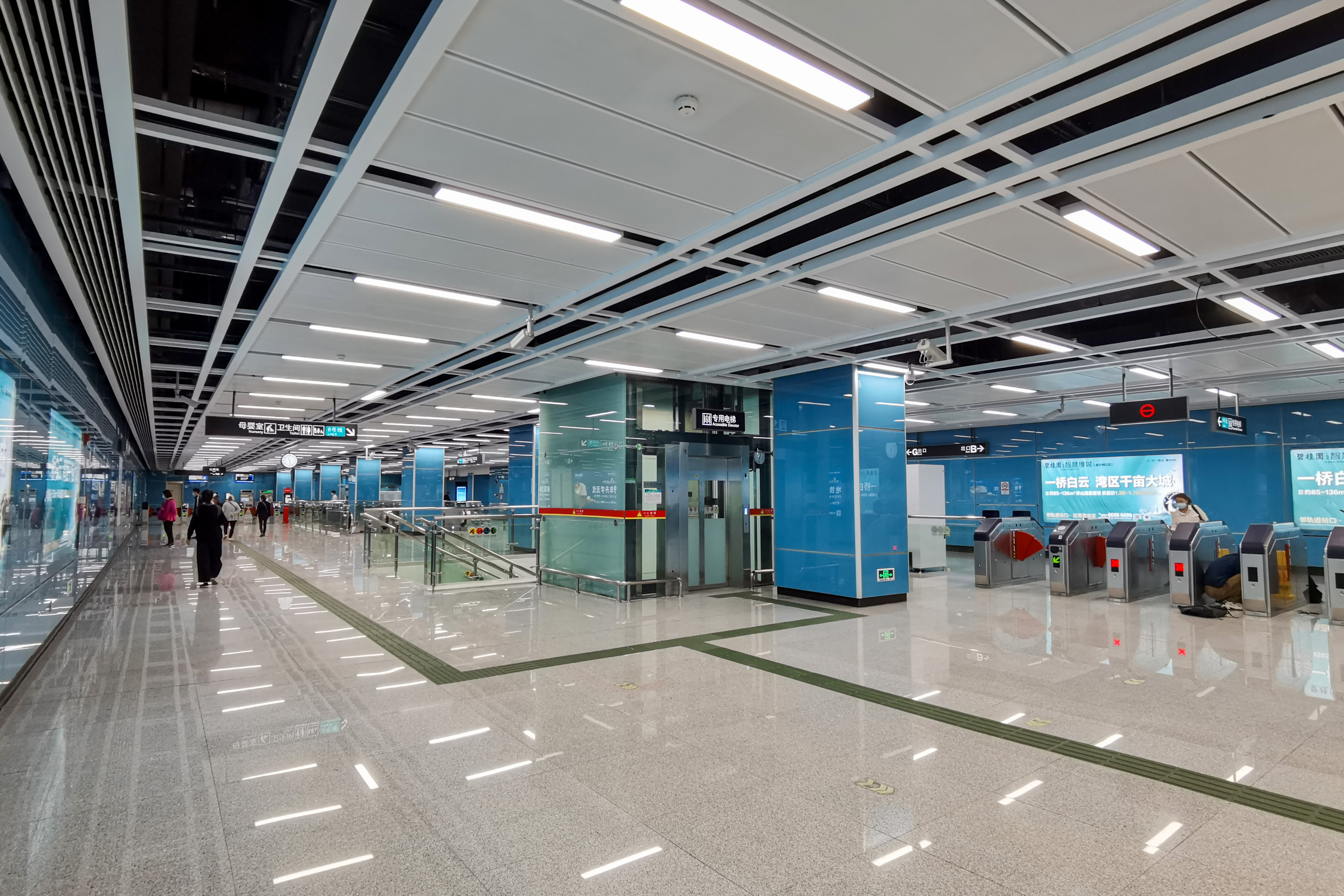
Concourse
