= Shijing station (Guangzhou Metro) =

Metro station in Guangzhou, China

Shijing 石井
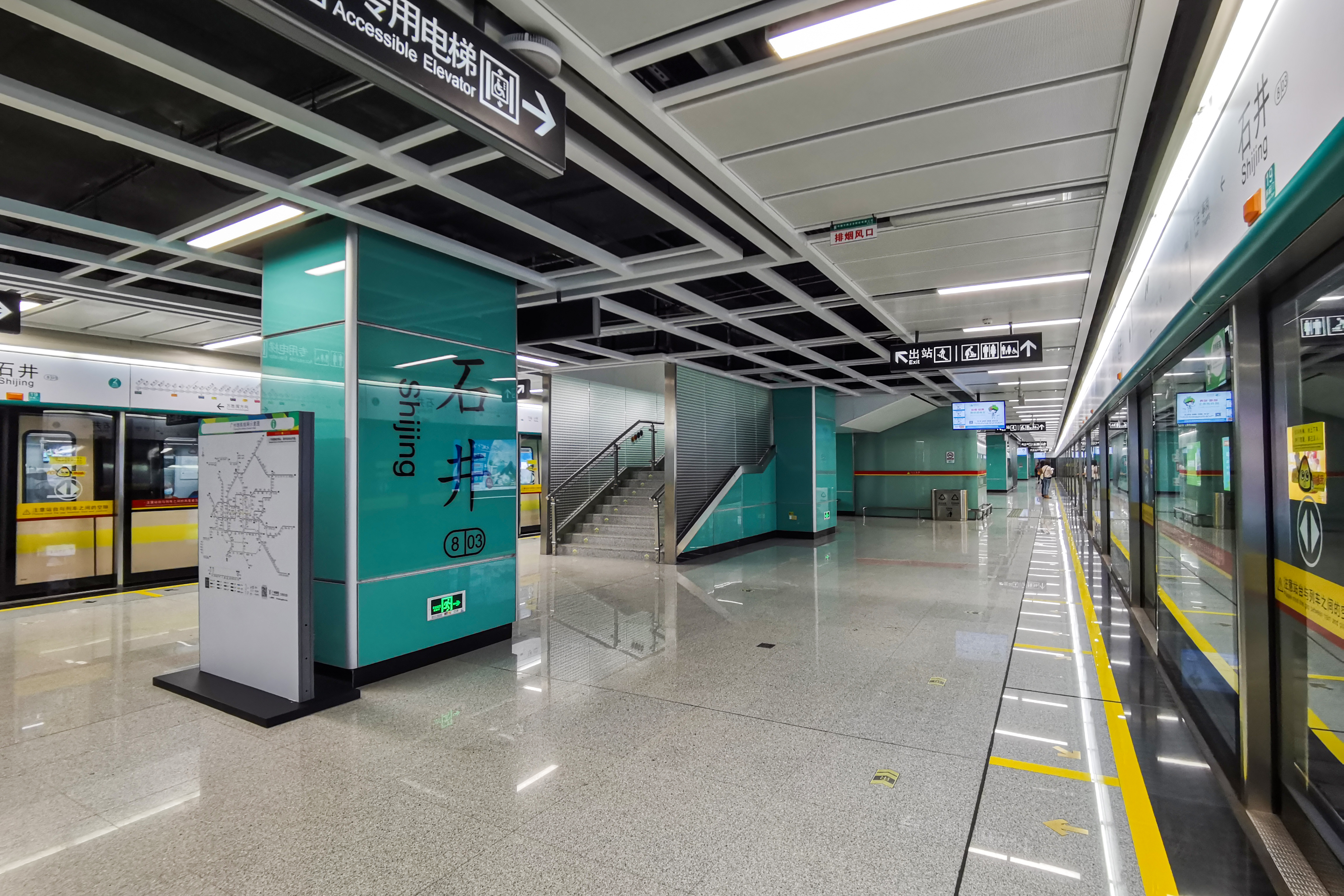
- Platform

Chinese name
- Simplified Chinese: 石井站
- Traditional Chinese: 石井站
Transcriptions
Standard Mandarin
- Hanyu Pinyin: Shíjǐng Zhàn
Yue: Cantonese
- Jyutping: sek^{2}zeng^{2}zaam^{6}

General information
- Location: Shisha Road, Shijing Avenue, Shifeng Road, Baiyun District, Guangzhou, Guangdong; China
- Coordinates: 23.2141667°N 113.2255111°E
- Operated by: Guangzhou Metro Co. Ltd.
- Line: Line 8
- Platforms: 2 (1 island platform)
- Tracks: 2

Construction
- Structure type: Underground
- Accessible: Yes

Other information
- Station code: 803

History
- Opened: 26 November 2020; 5 years ago

Services
Preceding station	Guangzhou Metro	Following station
Tinggang towards Jiaoxin	Line 8	Xiaoping towards Wanshengwei
Location

Shijing Station (Chinese: 石井站; pinyin: Shíjǐng Zhàn; Jyutping: sek2 zeng2 zaam6) is a metro station of Guangzhou Metro Line 8, at Shijing Subdistrict, Baiyun District, Guangzhou, Guangdong, China. The station opened on November 26, 2020, with the opening of the northern extension of Line 8.

The station has an underground island platform. Platform 1 is for trains towards Jiaoxin, whilst platform 2 is for trains towards Wanshengwei. There are 4 exits, lettered A, B, C and D. Exit B is accessible. Exit A is located on Shijing Avenue, whilst exits B, C and D are located on Shisha Road.

== Gallery ==
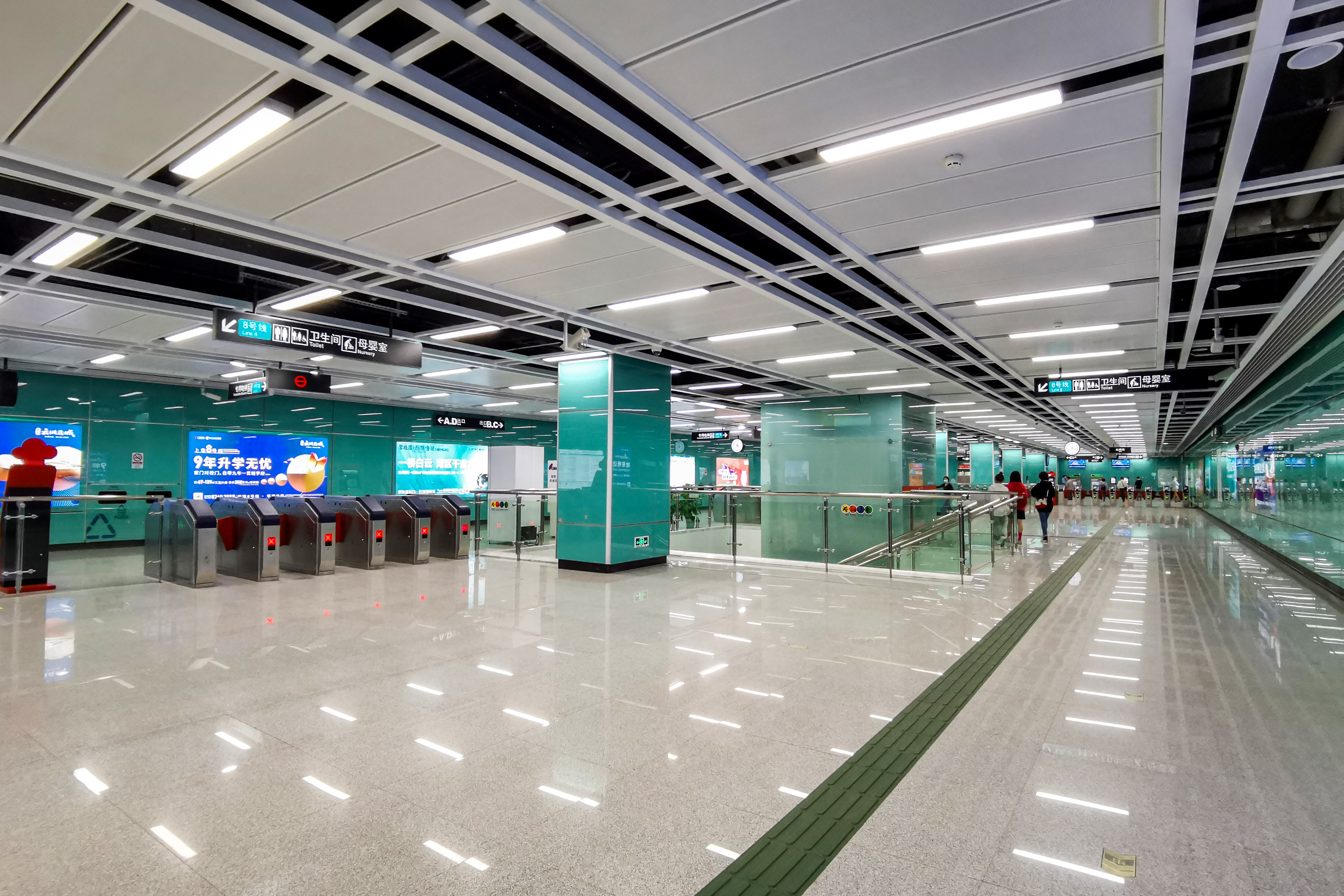
Concourse
