= Shitan station =

Guangzhou Metro Line 8 station

Shitan 石潭
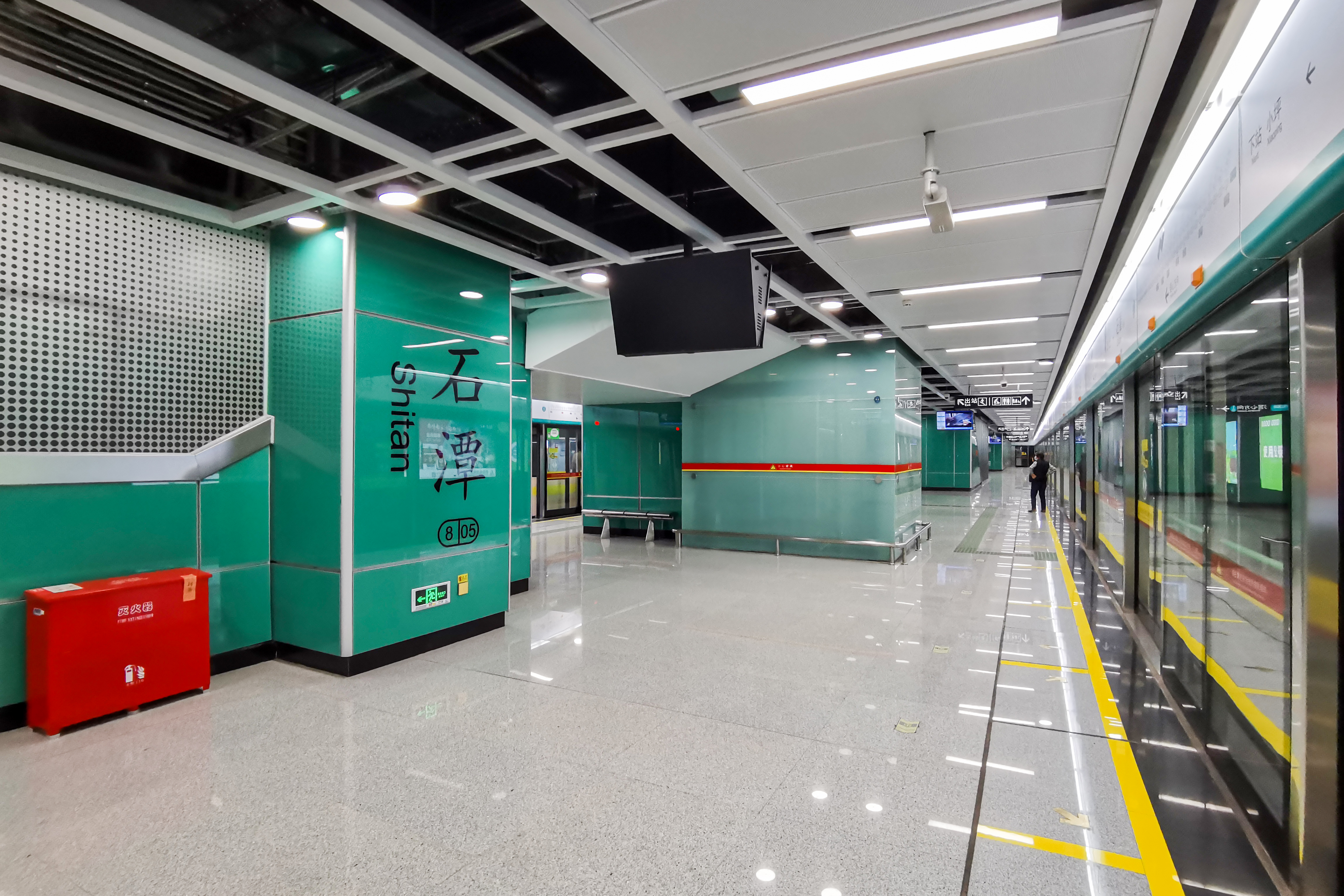
- Platform

Chinese name
- Chinese: 石潭站
Transcriptions
Standard Mandarin
- Hanyu Pinyin: Shítán Zhàn
Yue: Cantonese
- Yale Romanization: Sehktàahm Jaahm
- Jyutping: Sek^{6}taam^{4} Zaam^{6}

General information
- Location: Intersection of Shicha Road (石槎路) and Tangcha Road (棠槎路) Overpass; Shijing Subdistrict, Baiyun District, Guangzhou, Guangdong; China
- Coordinates: 23°11′26.520″N 113°14′8.610″E
- Operator: Guangzhou Metro Co. Ltd.
- Line: Line 8
- Platforms: 2 (1 island platform)
- Tracks: 2
- Connections: Guangzhou Baiyun railway station

Construction
- Structure type: Underground
- Accessible: Yes

Other information
- Station code: 805

History
- Opened: 26 November 2020 (5 years ago)

Services
Preceding station	Guangzhou Metro	Following station
Xiaoping towards Jiaoxin	Line 8	Julong towards Wanshengwei
Location

Shitan Station (Chinese: 石潭站; pinyin: Shítán Zhàn; Cantonese Yale: Sehktàahm Jaahm) is a station on Line 8 of the Guangzhou Metro. It is located at the intersection of Shicha Road and Tangcha Road in Guangzhou's Baiyun District. The station opened on 26 November 2020 with the opening of the northern extension of Line 8.

The station has a connection link to the nearby Guangzhou Baiyun railway station.

== Station structure ==
=== Platform layout ===
The station is a two-storey underground station. The ground level is the exit, and it is surrounded by Shicha Road, Tangtan Road, Tangcha Road Overpass, Guangzhou Baiyun railway station west square, Yuesheng Square and other nearby buildings. The first floor is the concourse, and the second floor is the platform for Line 8.

Like the stations in the northern extension of Line 8, this station is decorated in glass curtain panels. The color of the station is emerald.

G	-	Exits A, B, C, D
L1; Concourse	Transfer passage	Towards Guangzhou Baiyun railway station Ticket Machines, Security Facilities
L1; Concourse	Concourse	Ticket Machines, Customer Service, Shops, Police Station, Security Facilities
L2; Platforms	Platform 1	8 towards Jiaoxin (Xiaoping)
L2; Platforms	Island platform, doors will open on the left (Toilets, Nursery)
L2; Platforms	Platform 2	8 towards Wanshengwei (Julong)

=== Concourse ===
The concourse is equipped with electronic ticket vending machines and a customer service center. There are also self-service facilities like automatic vending machines. There are elevators, escalators and stairs in the fare-paid area for passengers to access the platform.

In addition, there are multiple sets of ticket machines at the transfer passage to Guangzhou Baiyun railway station near the station part of Line 8, and the interface to the paid area of the concourse is equipped with multiple sets of turnstiles for passengers to enter and exit, and the security screening facilities are located on the side of the passage near Guangzhou Baiyun Station.

=== Platform ===
The station has an island platform under Shicha Road. Toilets and a nursery room are located at the northern end of the platform towards Xiaoping.

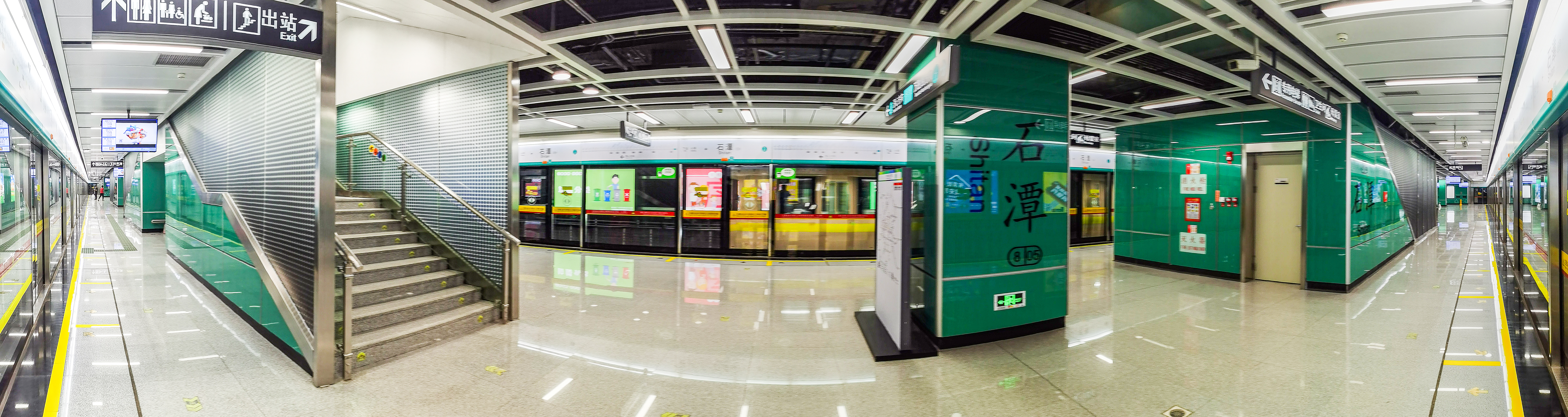
Platform panorama

=== Entrances/exits ===
The station has 4 points of entry/exit, of which Exits B to D opened with the station's initial opening, whilst Exit A opened on 20 August 2022. Exit B is accessible via elevator.

In addition, there is a transfer passage for passengers to and from Guangzhou Baiyun railway station of the national railway through the station body of Line 22 in the middle of the paid area of the concourse and the passage of Exit B of the station's non-paid area, and 6 pairs of 12 moving walkways were set up in the passage. The passage was opened on 26 December 2023 with the opening of the national railway station.

- A: Shicha Road
- B: Shicha Road
- C: Shicha Road
- D: Shicha Road
- Transfer passage (Note: The station guidance only signs Exit B towards Guangzhou Baiyun Station): Guangzhou Baiyun railway station
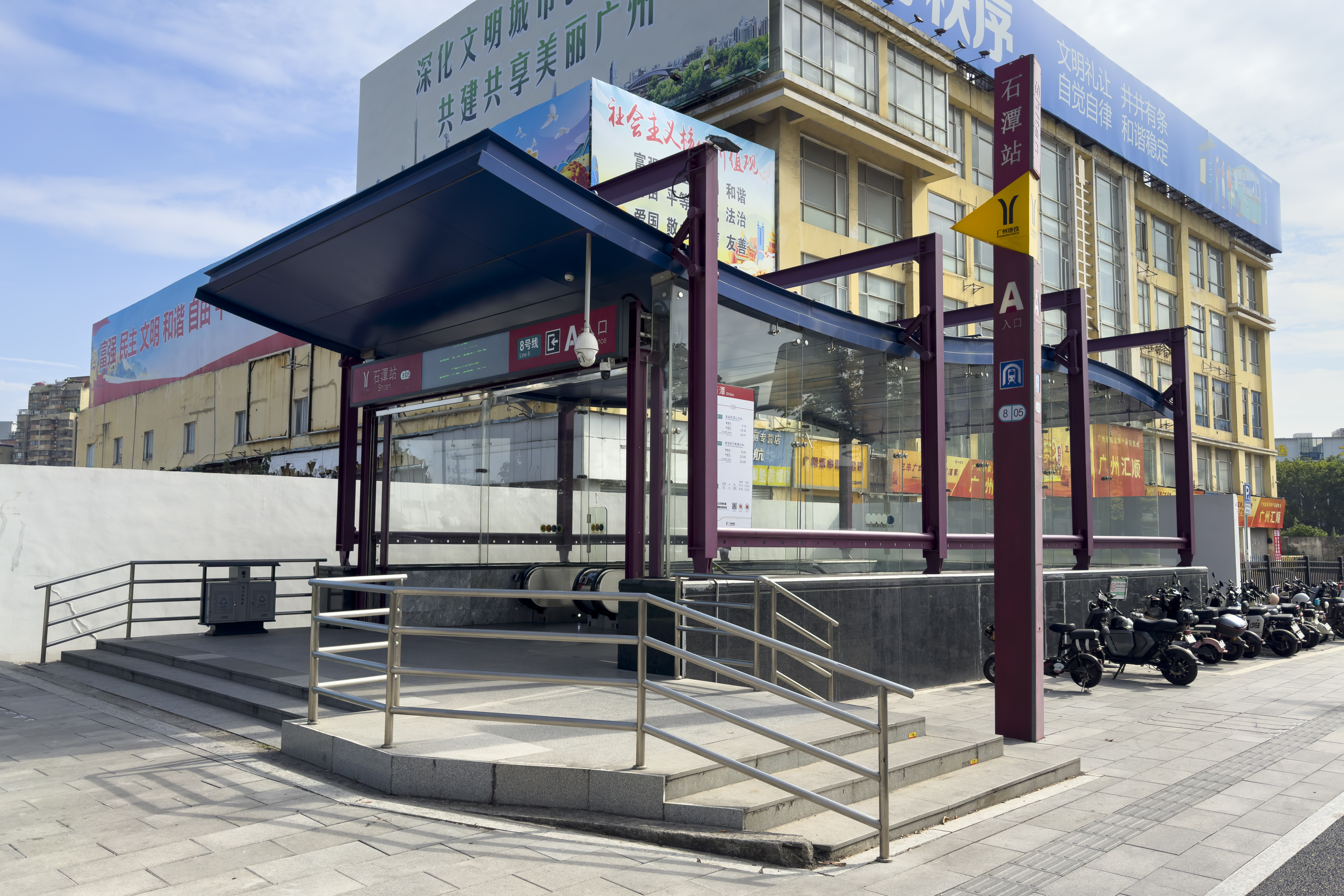
Entrance A

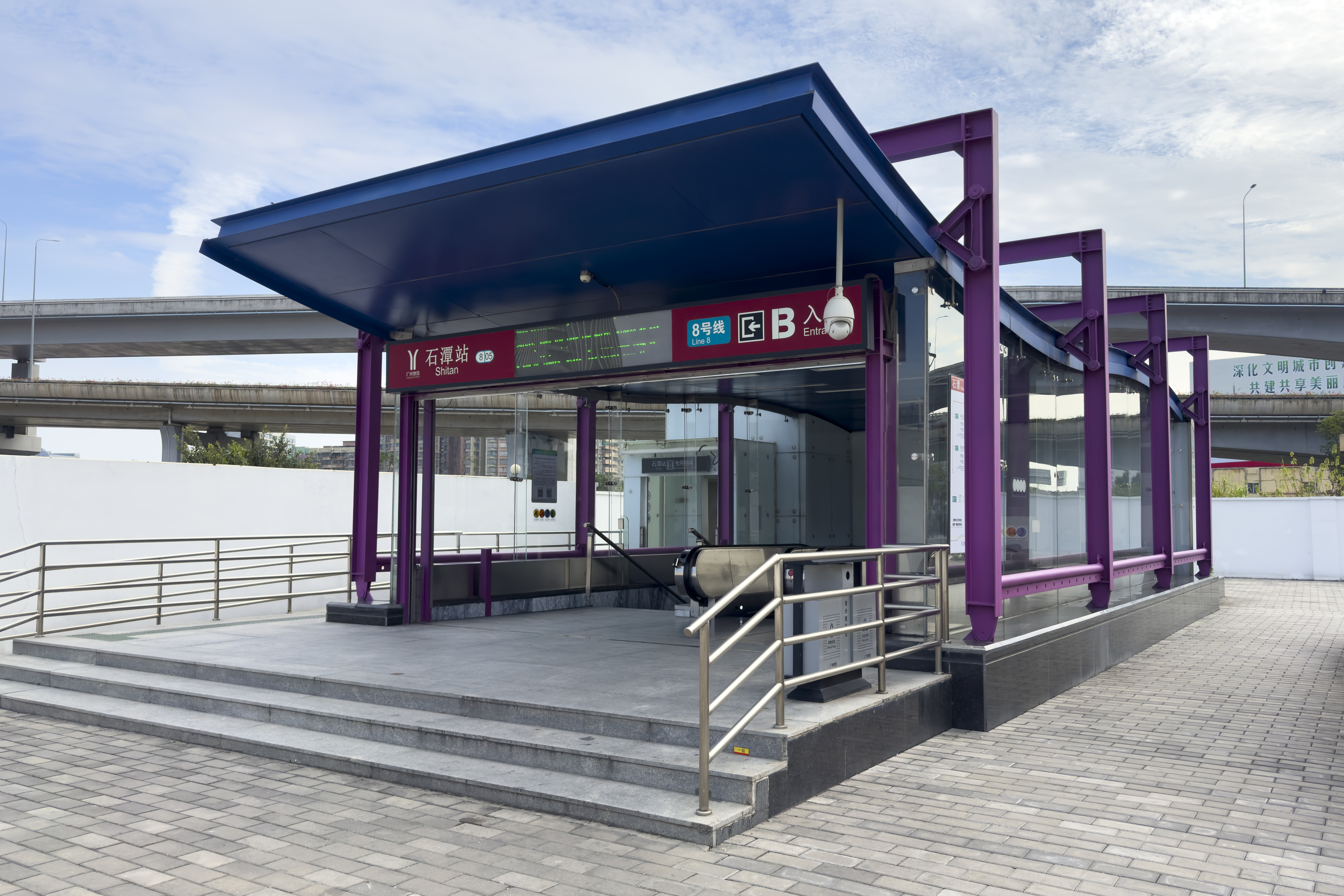
Entrance B

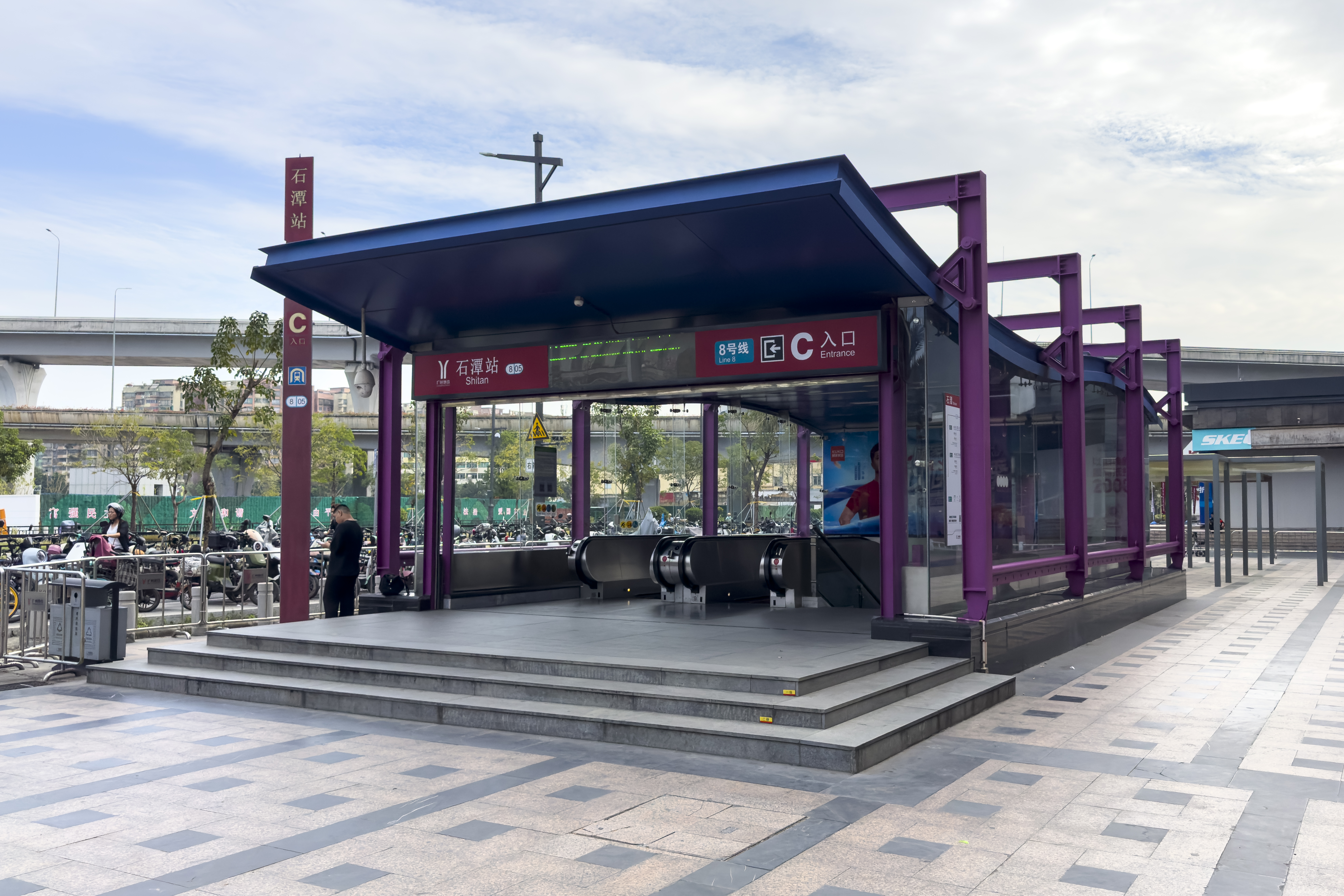
Entrance C

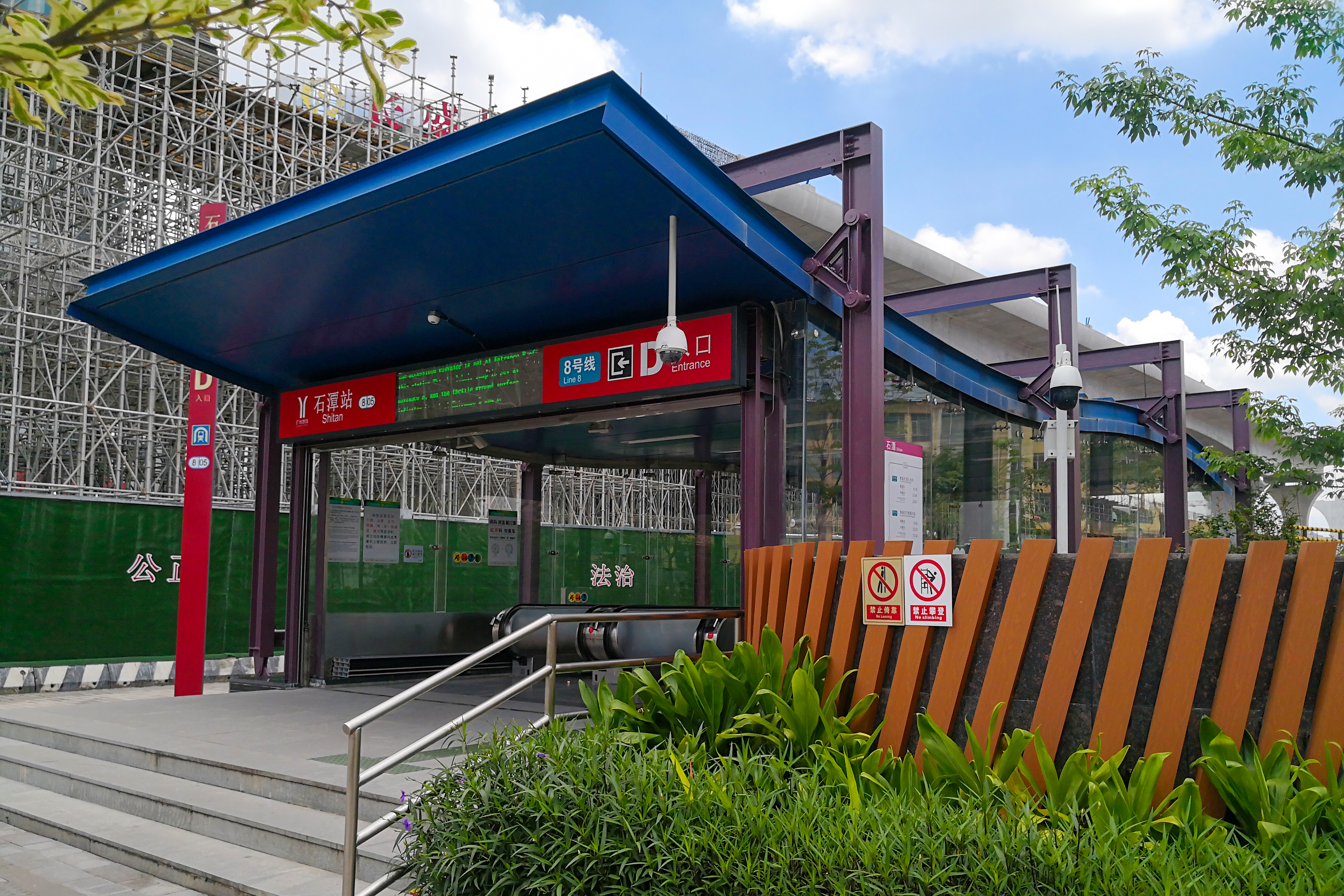
Entrance D

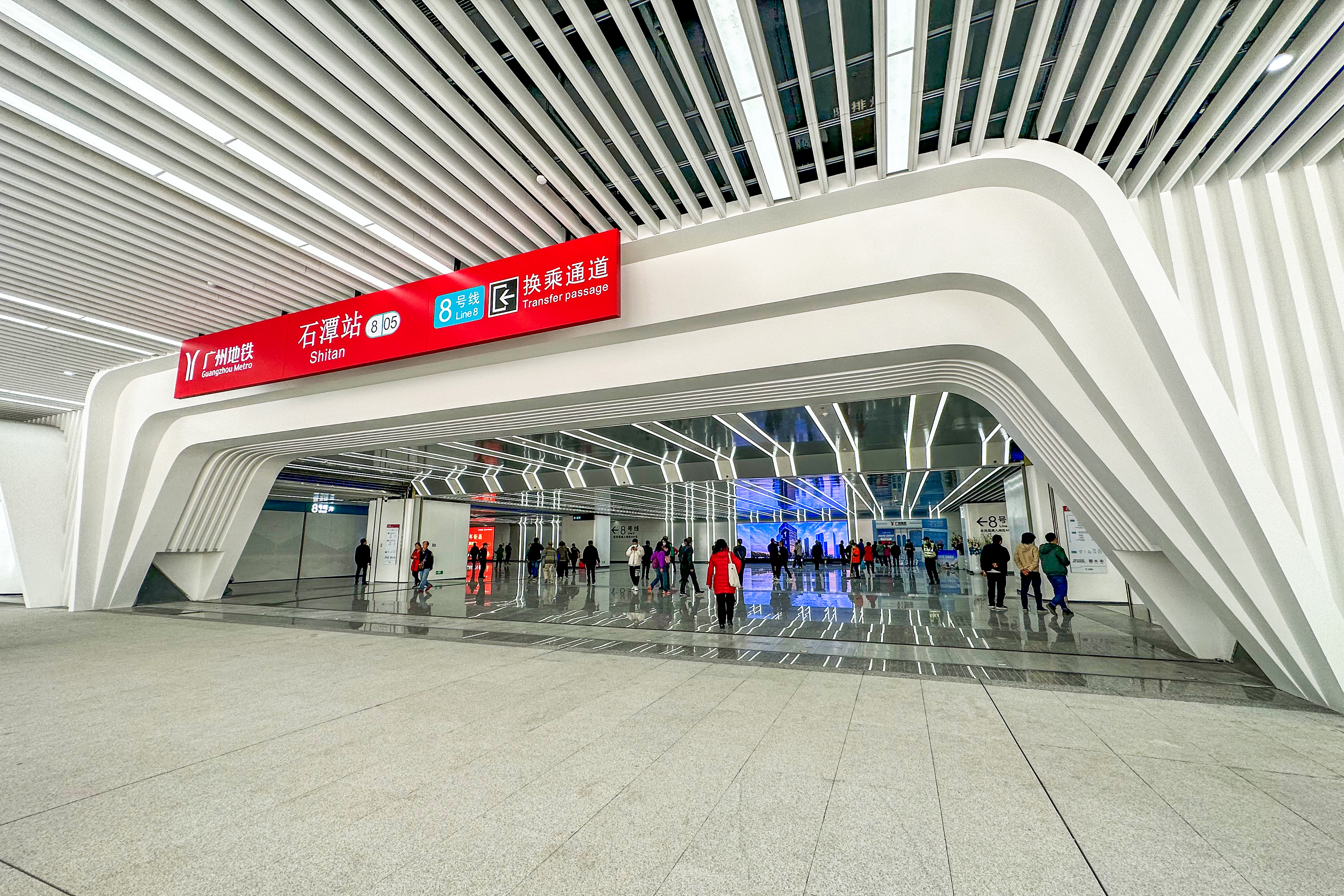
Guangzhou Baiyun Railway Station transfer passage

== Gallery ==
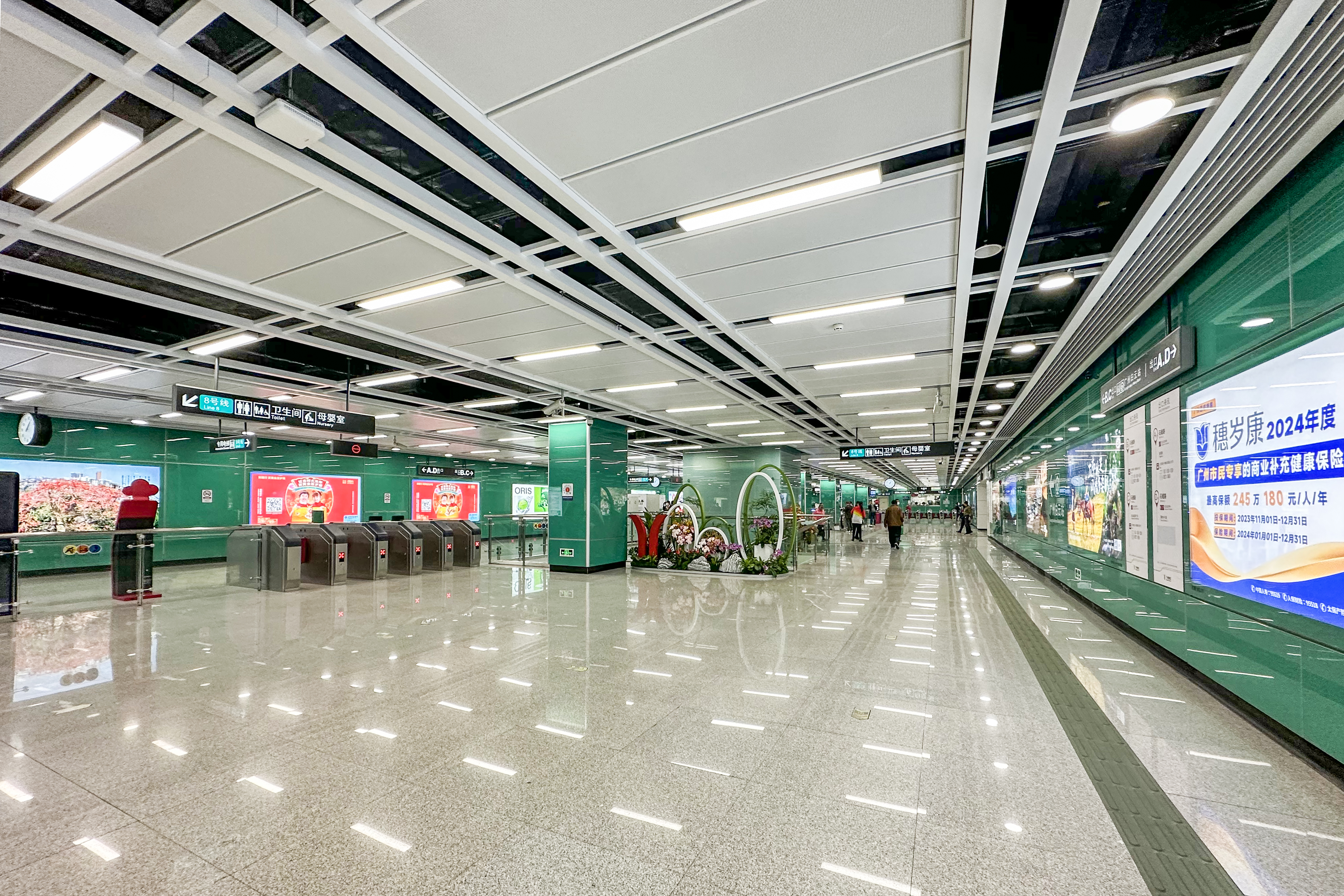
Concourse

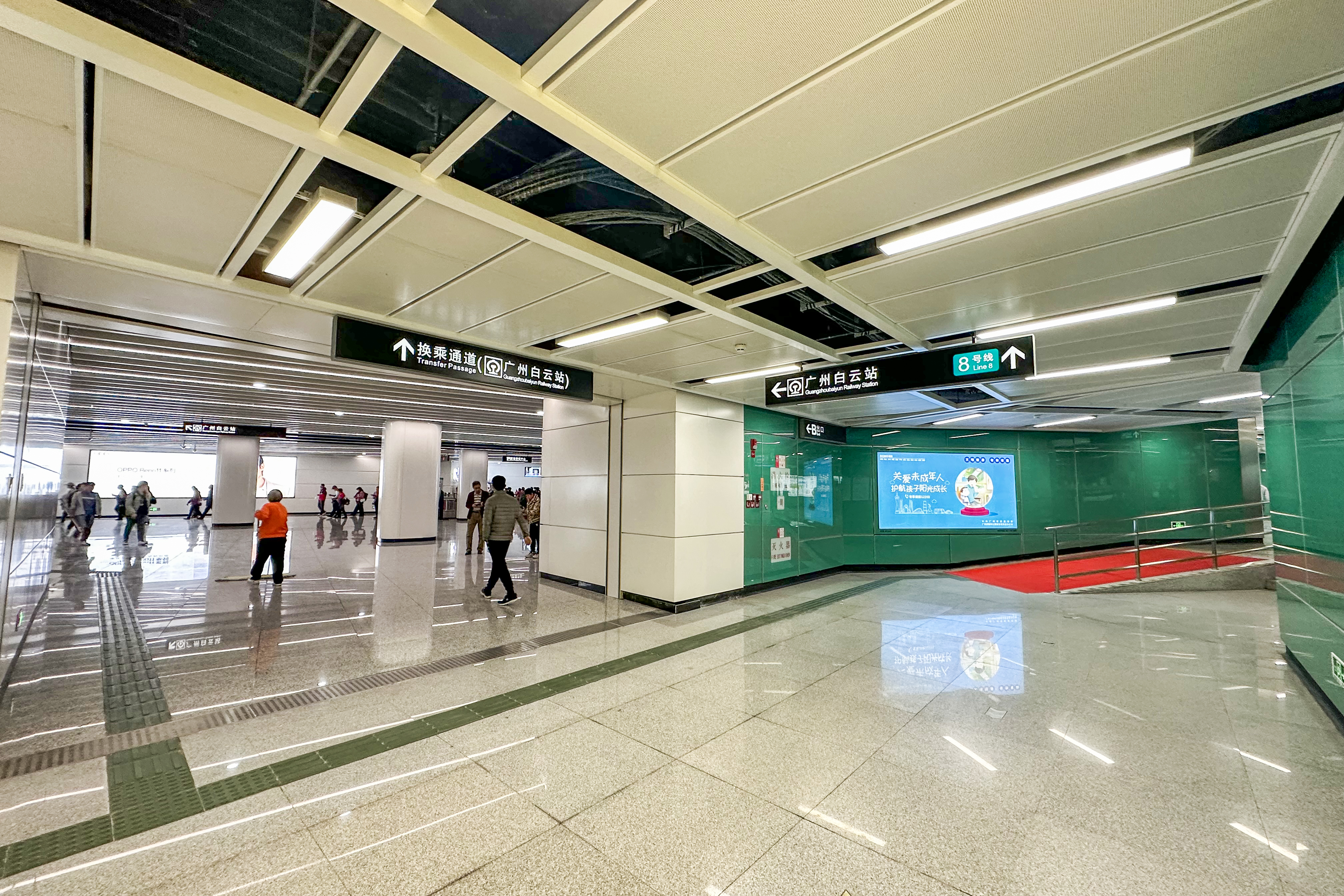
The interface of the transfer passage to Guangzhou Baiyun Station in the Exit B passage

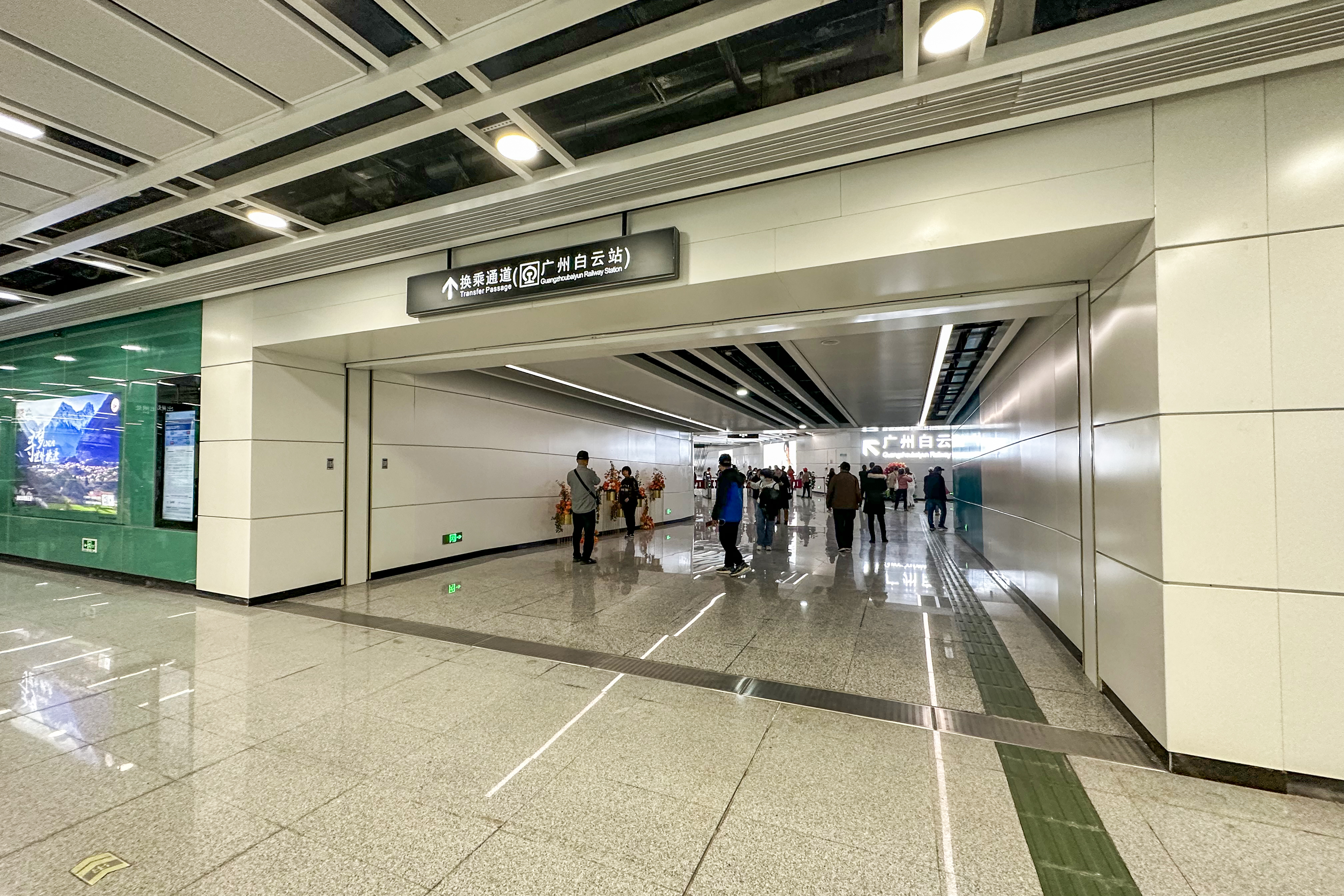
The interface of the transfer passage to Guangzhou Baiyun Station in the station paid area

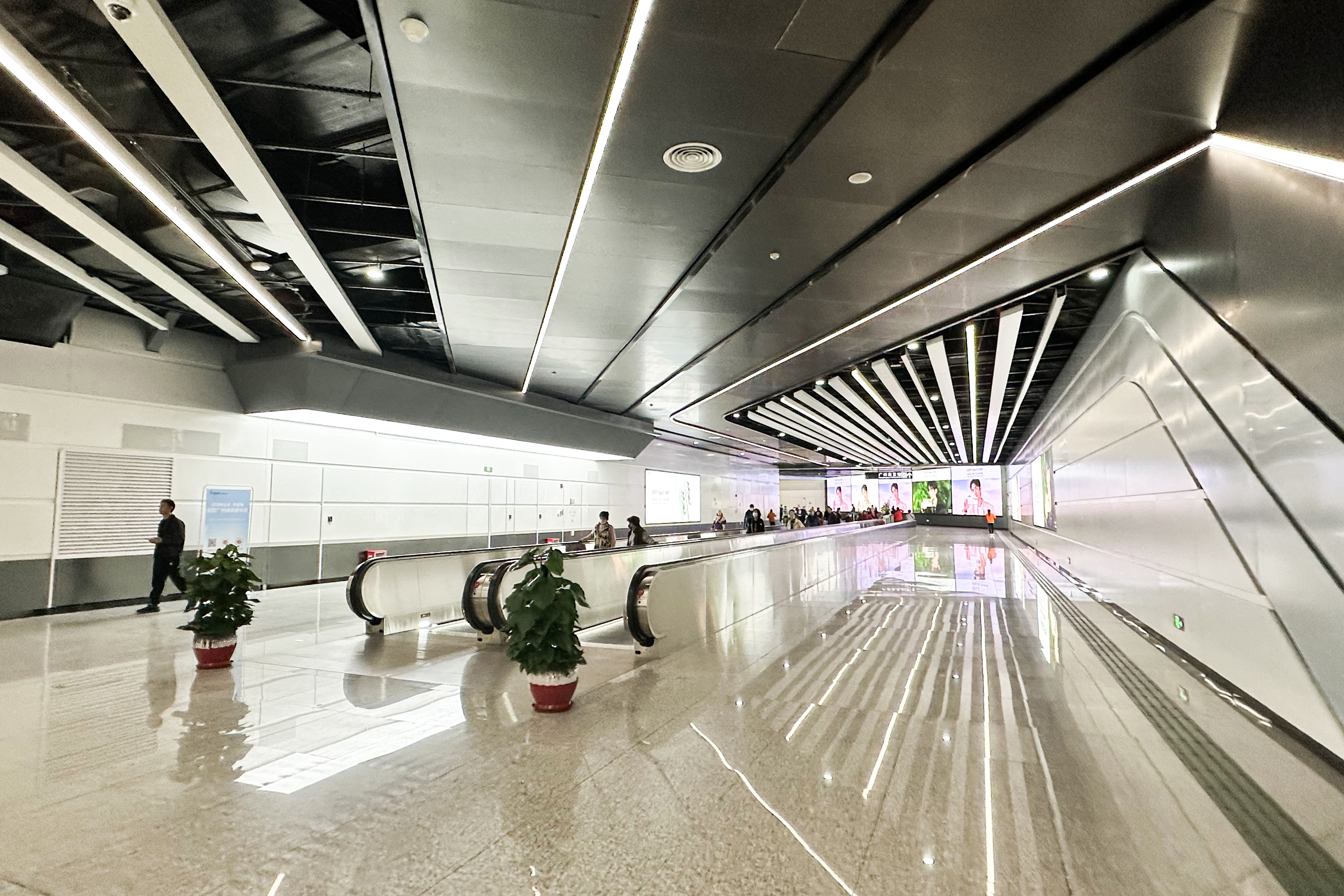
Transfer passage to Guangzhou Baiyun Station

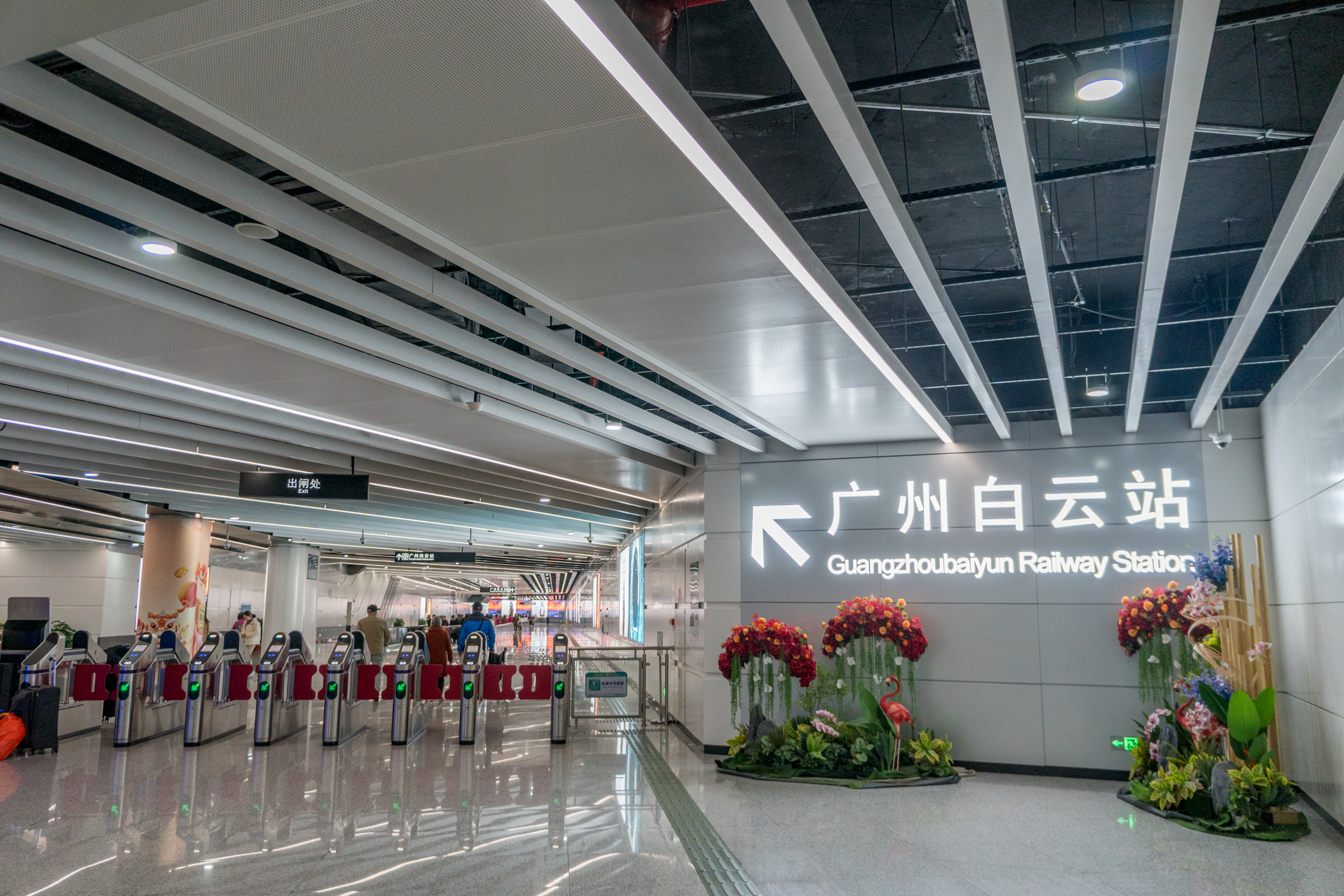
Exit gate of the transfer passage of Guangzhou Baiyun Station

== Usage ==
The area around the station is mainly residential and industrial areas, with a daily passenger flow of about 10,000 people. After the opening of Guangzhou Baiyun Station, this station became the only metro station connected to the national railway station before the opening of Line 12, so it attracted a large number of passengers to use this station to travel to and from Baiyun Station. Within half a month of its opening, the number of passengers at the station surged to about 40,000, of which 92% of passengers entered the station through the Baiyun Station transfer passage.

== History ==
In 1997, in the "Guangzhou City Urban Expressway, Traffic Network Planning Research (Final Report)", the then Line 4 set up Pingshacun station north of the current station. In the 2003 plan, most of the section of the line became part of the current Line 8, and the station was split into two stations, and the station was moved south to its current location and named Pingsha station. On 2 December 2016, the Guangzhou Civil Affairs Bureau announced the initial names of the stations on the northern extension of Line 8, and the station was named Shitan station.

The station was successfully powered in March 2020, and on 31 July the same year, the station completed the "three rights" transfer.

On 26 November 2020, the station opened with the opening of the northern extension of Line 8.

During COVID-19 pandemic control rules in 2022, the station was affected by prevention and control measures many times and needed to adjust its services. From 11:45 a.m. on 4 December 2021 to 5 December 2021, station service was temporarily suspended. During the epidemic in April, the station was suspended from 9 to 23 April. During the year-end epidemic, the station was suspended from 21 to 27 November.
