= Tinggang station =

Metro station in Guangzhou, China

Tinggang 亭岗
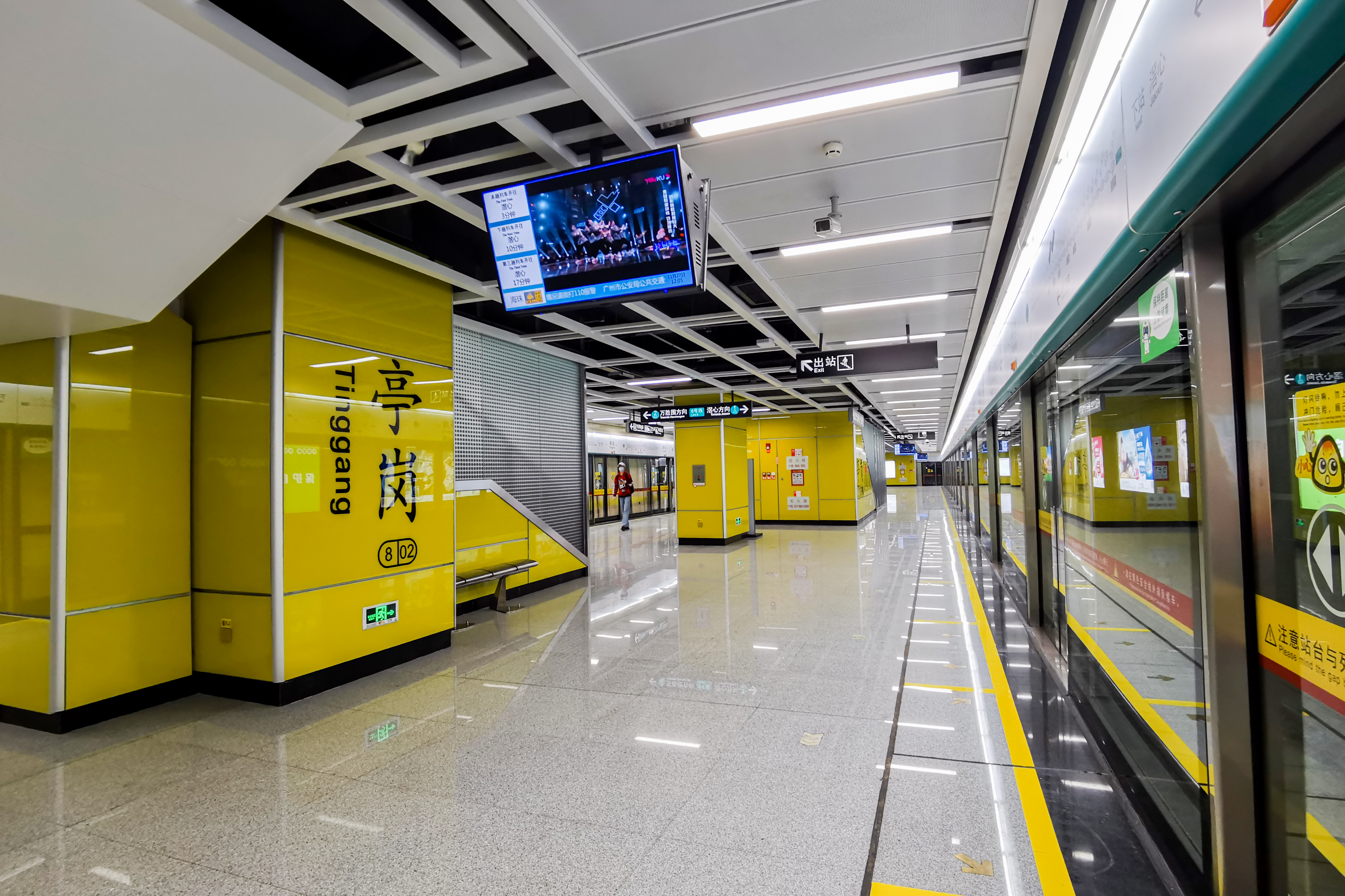
- Platform

Chinese name
- Simplified Chinese: 亭岗站
- Traditional Chinese: 亭崗站
Transcriptions

General information
- Location: Shisha Road, Hubin South Road, Baiyun District, Guangzhou, Guangdong; China
- Coordinates: 23.2249444°N 113.2146528°E
- Operated by: Guangzhou Metro Co. Ltd.
- Line: Line 8
- Platforms: 2 (1 island platform)
- Tracks: 2

Construction
- Structure type: Underground
- Accessible: Yes

Other information
- Station code: 802

History
- Opened: 26 November 2020; 5 years ago

Services
Preceding station	Guangzhou Metro	Following station
Jiaoxin Terminus	Line 8	Shijing towards Wanshengwei
Location

Tinggang Station (simplified Chinese: 亭岗站; traditional Chinese: 亭崗站) is a station of Guangzhou Metro Line 8, located underground on the south side of Hubin South Road, Shisha Road, Baiyun District, Guangzhou, Guangdong Province, China. The station was opened on November 26, 2020 with the opening of the northern extension of Guangzhou Metro Line 8.

The station has an underground island platform. Platform 1 is for trains towards Jiaoxin, whilst platform 2 is for trains towards Wanshengwei. There are 4 exits, lettered A, B, C and D. Exit A is accessible. All exits are located on Shisha Road.

== Gallery ==
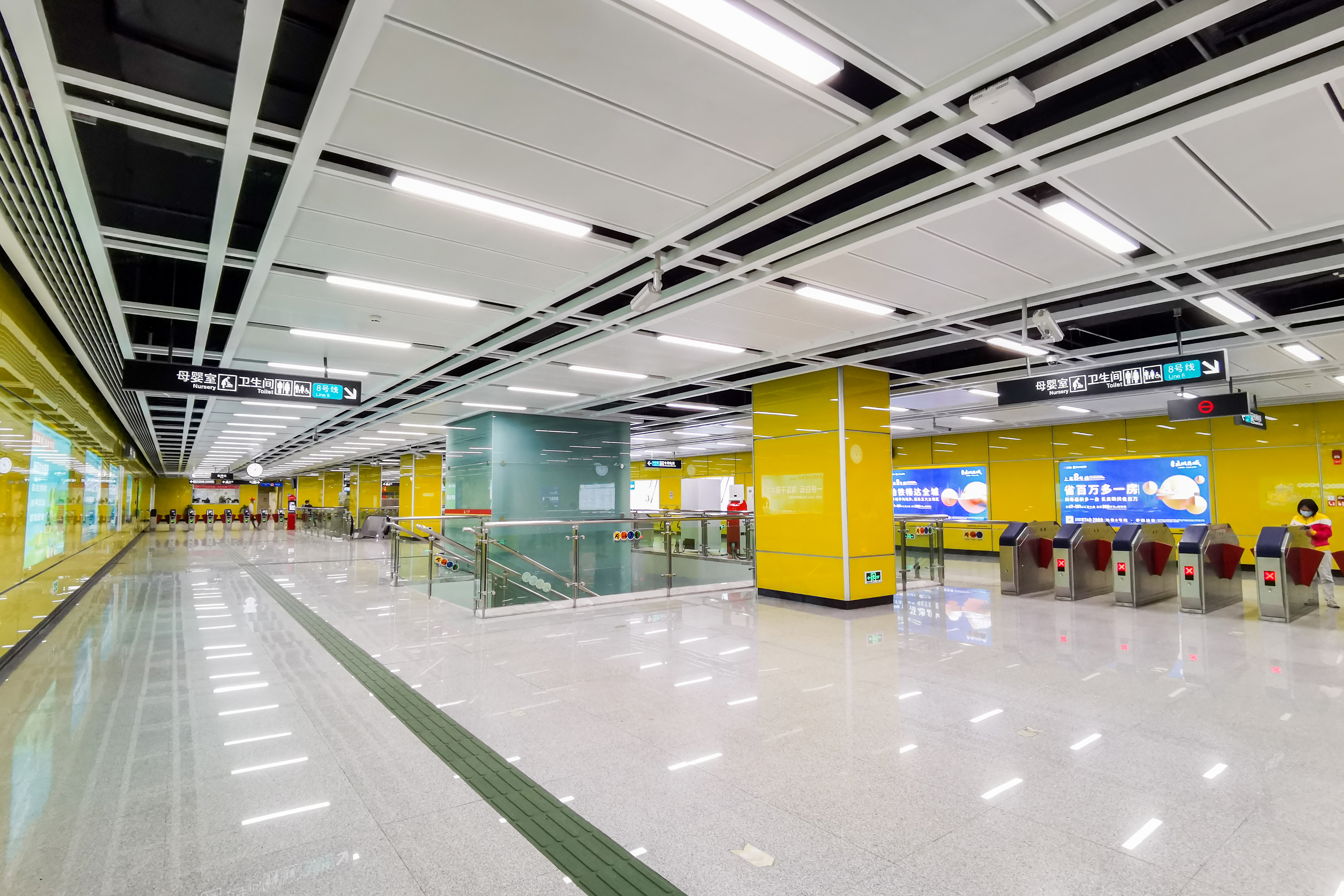
Concourse

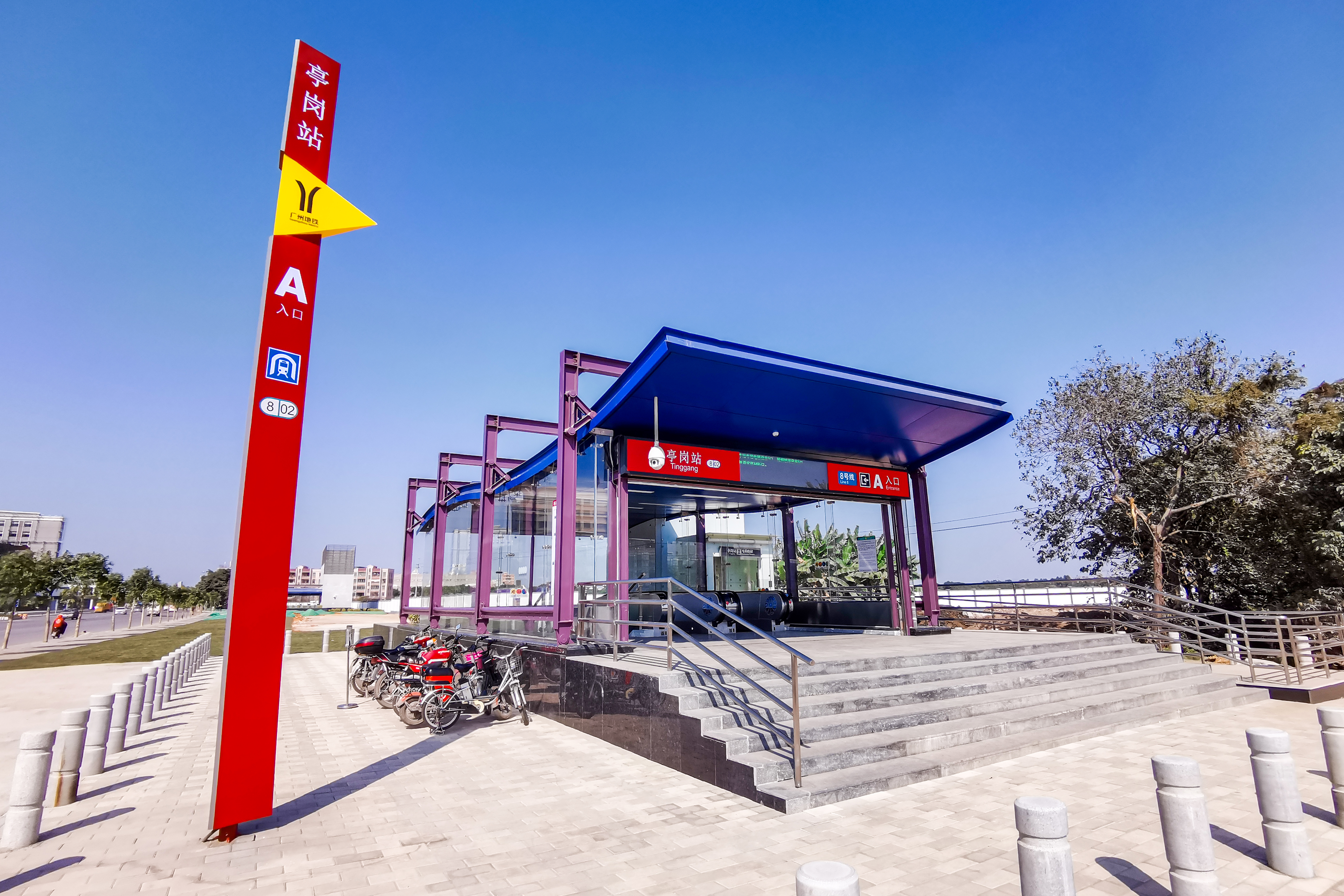
Exit A

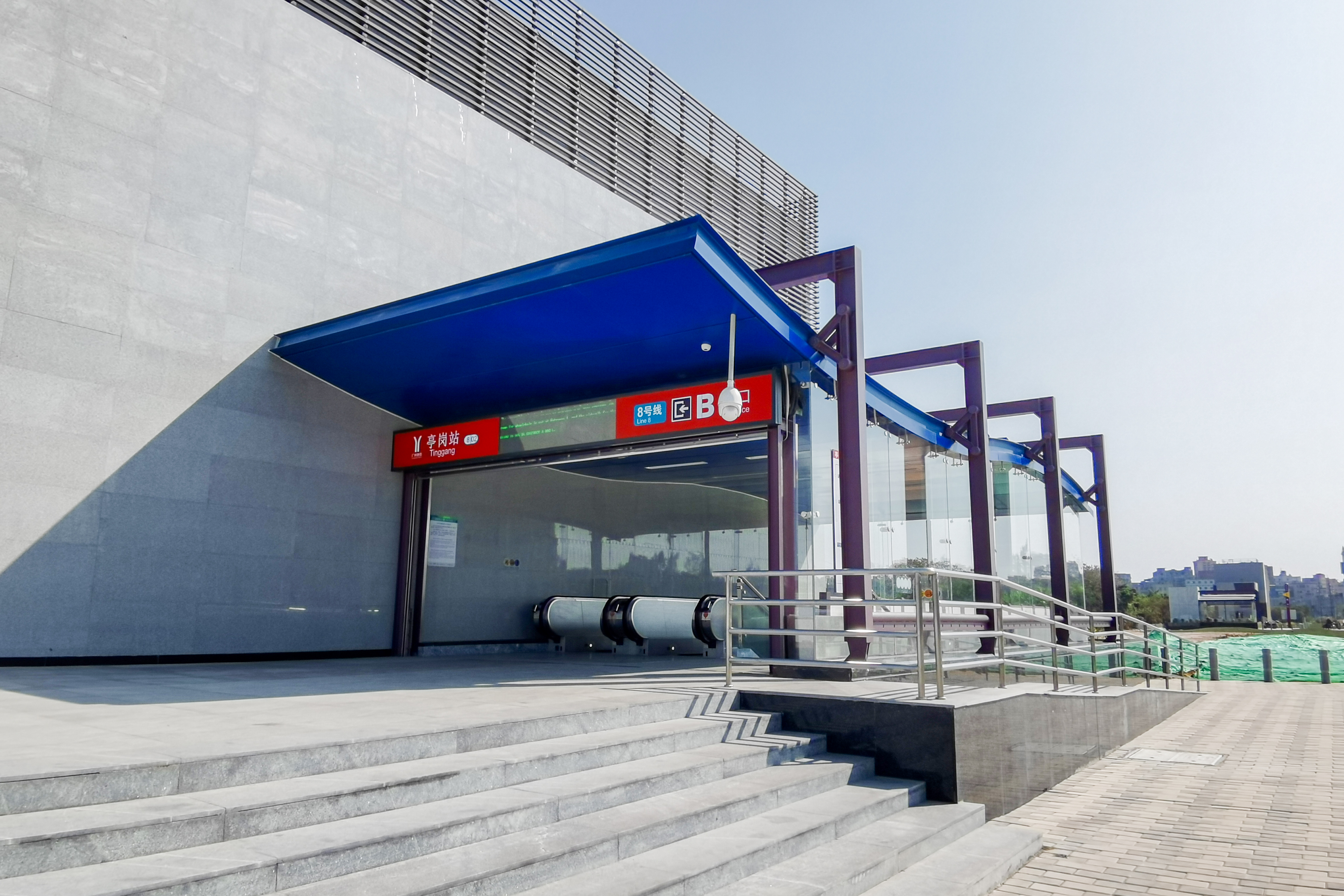
Exit B

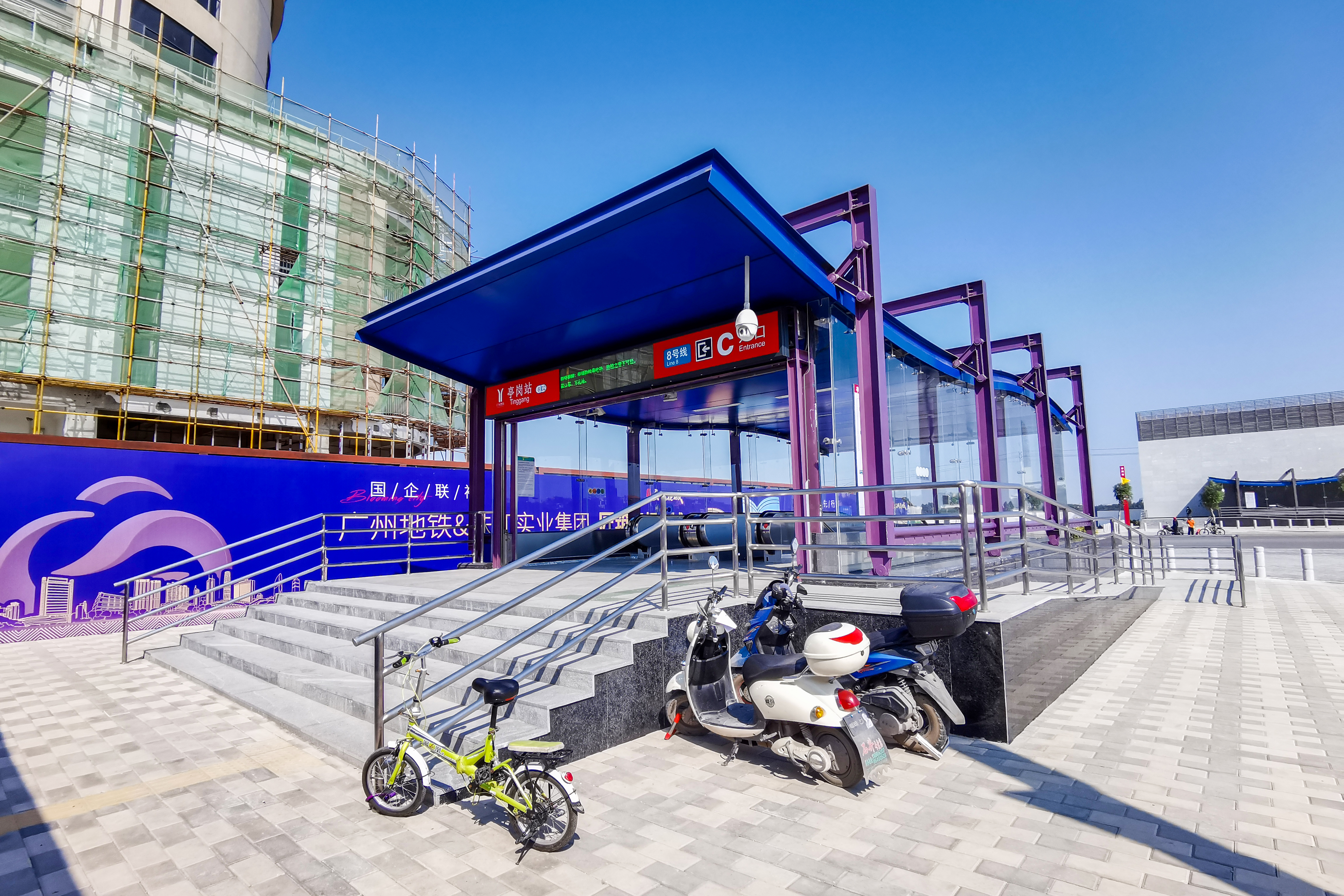
Exit C

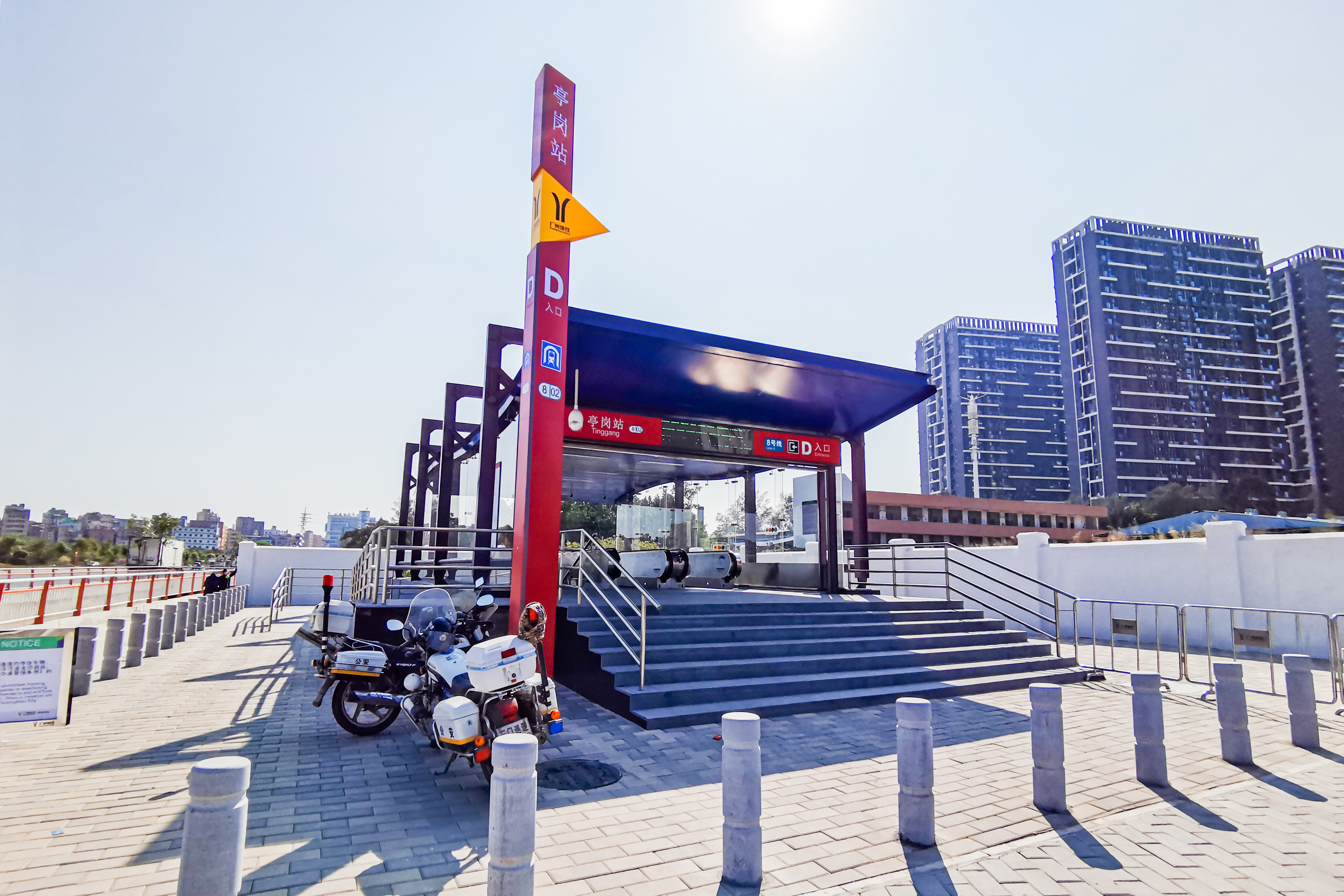
Exit D

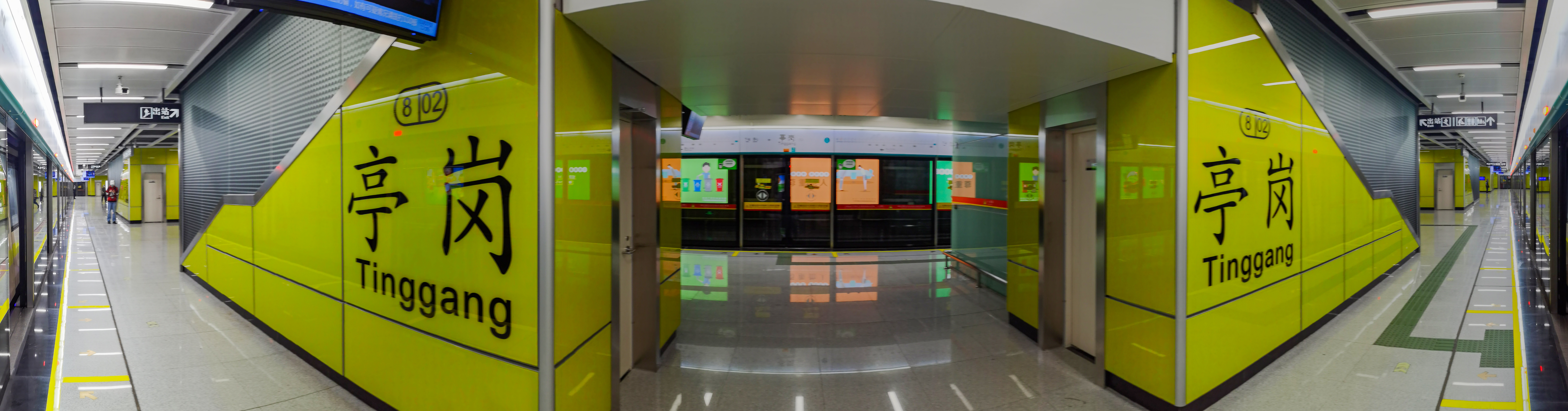
Platform Panorama
