= List of Guangzhou Metro stations =

Map of Guangzhou and Foshan Metro network

Guangzhou Metro is the metro system that serves the city of Guangzhou in Guangdong Province of the People's Republic of China. It is operated by the state-owned Guangzhou Metro Corporation and was the fourth metro system to be built in mainland China. Having delivered 1.99 billion rides in 2013, it is one of the busiest metro systems in the world.

The current Guangzhou Metro system consists of nineteen metro lines and three tram lines. (Note: The tram lines are also operated by Guangzhou Tram Corporation)

- Line 1 (Guangzhou East Railway Station – Xilang)
- Line 2 (Jiahewanggang – Guangzhou South Railway Station)
- Line 3 (Tianhe Coach Terminal/Airport North – Haibang)
- Line 4 (Huangcun – Nansha Passenger Port)
- Line 5 (Jiaokou – Huangpu New Port)
- Line 6 (Xunfenggang – Xiangxue)
- Line 7 (Meidi Dadao – Yanshan)
- Line 8 (Jiaoxin – Wanshengwei)
- Line 9 (Fei'eling – Gaozeng)
- Line 10 (Xilang – Yangji East)
- Line 11 (Chisha – Longtan)
- Line 12 (Xunfenggang – Guangzhou Gymnasium / Ersha Island – Higher Education Mega Center South)
- Line 13 (Tianhe Park – Xinsha)
- Line 14 (Lejia Road – Dongfeng / Xinhe – Zhenlong)
- Line 18 (Xiancun – Wanqingsha)
- Line 21 (Tianhe Park – Zengcheng Square)
- Line 22 (Fangcun – Panyu Square)
- Guangfo line (Xincheng Dong – Lijiao)
- APM line (Linhexi – Canton Tower)
- Haizhu Tram (Canton Tower – Wanshengwei)
- Huangpu Tram Line 1 (Xinfeng Lu – Xiangxue)
- Huangpu Tram Line 2 (Xiangxue – Kaiyuan Road East)

Below is a list of Guangzhou Metro stations in operation sorted by lines.

== Line 1 ==
Stations of Line 1, Guangzhou Metro
Station	Station No.	Chinese name	Location	Transfers	Platform type	Grade	Opened
Xilang	101	西塱	Liwan District	10 Guangfo 22	Side/dual-island hybrid	At-grade	28 June 1997
Kengkou	102	坑口	Liwan District		Side	At-grade	28 June 1997
Huadiwan	103	花地湾	Liwan District		Side	Underground	28 June 1997
Fangcun	104	芳村	Liwan District	11 22	Island	Underground	28 June 1997
Huangsha	105	黄沙	Liwan District	6	Island	Underground	28 June 1997
Changshou Lu	106	长寿路	Liwan District		Island	Underground	28 June 1999
Chen Clan Academy	107	陈家祠	Liwan District	8	Island	Underground	28 June 1999
Ximenkou	108	西门口	Yuexiu District		Island	Underground	28 June 1999
Gongyuanqian	109	公园前	Yuexiu District	2	Spanish solution	Underground	28 June 1999
Peasant Movement Institute	110	农讲所	Yuexiu District		Island	Underground	28 June 1999
Martyrs' Park	111	烈士陵园	Yuexiu District	12	Island	Underground	28 June 1999
Dongshankou	112	东山口	Yuexiu District	6	Island	Underground	28 June 1999
Yangji	113	杨箕	Yuexiu District	5	Island	Underground	28 June 1999
Tiyu Xilu	114	体育西路	Tianhe District	3 OSI: APM (via Tianhenan)	Island	Underground	28 June 1999
Tianhe Sports Center	115	体育中心	Tianhe District		Island	Underground	28 June 1999
Guangzhou East Railway Station	116	广州东站	Tianhe District	3 11	Island	Underground	28 June 1999

== Line 2 ==
Stations of Line 2, Guangzhou Metro
Station	Station No.	Chinese name	Location	Transfers	Platform type	Grade	Opened
Guangzhou South Railway Station	201	广州南站	Panyu District	7 22; 2 Guangzhu; Guangzhao GH ER	Side/island hybrid	Underground	25 September 2010
Shibi	202	石壁	Panyu District	7	Island	Underground	25 September 2010
Huijiang	203	会江	Panyu District		Island	Underground	25 September 2010
Nanpu	204	南浦	Panyu District		Side/island hybrid	Underground	25 September 2010
Luoxi	205	洛溪	Panyu District		Island	Underground	25 September 2010
Nanzhou	206	南洲	Haizhu District	Guangfo	Island	Underground	25 September 2010
Dongxiao South	207	东晓南	Haizhu District	10	Dual-side	Underground	25 September 2010
Jiangtai Road	208	江泰路	Haizhu District	11	Island	Underground	25 September 2010
Changgang	209	昌岗	Haizhu District	8	Island	Underground	25 September 2010
Jiangnanxi	210	江南西	Haizhu District		Split	Underground	29 December 2002
The 2nd Workers' Cultural Palace	211	市二宫	Haizhu District		Island	Underground	29 December 2002
Haizhu Square	212	海珠广场	Yuexiu District	6	Island	Underground	29 December 2002
Gongyuanqian	213	公园前	Yuexiu District	1	Spanish solution	Underground	29 December 2002
Sun Yat-sen Memorial Hall	214	纪念堂	Yuexiu District		Island	Underground	29 December 2002
Yuexiu Park	215	越秀公园	Yuexiu District		Split	Underground	29 December 2002
Guangzhou Railway Station	216	广州火车站	Yuexiu District	5 11 14	Island	Underground	29 December 2002
Sanyuanli	217	三元里	Baiyun District		Island	Underground	29 December 2002
Feixiang Park	218	飞翔公园	Baiyun District		Stacked side	Underground	25 September 2010
Baiyun Park	219	白云公园	Baiyun District		Stacked side	Underground	25 September 2010
Baiyun Culture Square	220	白云文化广场	Baiyun District	12	Stacked side	Underground	25 September 2010
Xiao-gang	221	萧岗	Baiyun District		Side/island hybrid	Underground	25 September 2010
Jiangxia	222	江夏	Baiyun District		Stacked side	Underground	25 September 2010
Huangbian	223	黄边	Baiyun District		Stacked side	Underground	25 September 2010
Jiahewanggang	224	嘉禾望岗	Baiyun District	3 14	Dual-island	Underground	25 September 2010

== Line 3 ==
Stations of Line 3, Guangzhou Metro
Station	Station No.	Chinese name	Location	Transfers	Platform type	Grade	Opened
Main route
Haibang	301-4	海傍	Panyu District	4	Island	Underground	1 November 2024
Haichong Lu	301-3	海涌路	Panyu District		Island	Underground	1 November 2024
Shiqinan	301-2	石碁南	Panyu District		Dual-Island	Underground	1 November 2024
Bangjiang	301-1	傍江	Panyu District		Island	Underground	1 November 2024
Panyu Square	301	番禺广场	Panyu District	18 22	Island	Underground	30 December 2006
Shiqiao	302	市桥	Panyu District		Island	Underground	30 December 2006
Hanxi Changlong	303	汉溪长隆	Panyu District	7 GH	Island	Underground	30 December 2006
Dashi	304	大石	Panyu District	ER	Island	Underground	30 December 2006
Xiajiao	305	厦滘	Panyu District		Island	Underground	30 December 2006
Lijiao	306	沥滘	Haizhu District	Guangfo	Island	Underground	30 December 2006
Datang	307	大塘	Haizhu District	11	Island	Underground	30 December 2006
Kecun	308	客村	Haizhu District	8	Island	Underground	26 December 2005
Canton Tower	309	广州塔	Haizhu District	APM THZ1	Island	Underground	26 December 2005
Zhujiang New Town	310	珠江新城	Tianhe District	5	Island	Underground	26 December 2005
Tiyu Xilu	311	体育西路	Tianhe District	1 OSI: APM (via Tianhenan)	Dual-island	Underground	26 December 2005
Linhexi	317	林和西	Tianhe District	APM	Island	Underground	26 December 2005
Guangzhou East Railway Station	318	广州东站	Tianhe District	1 11	Split	Underground	26 December 2005
Yantang	319	燕塘	Tianhe District	6	Split	Underground	30 October 2010
Meihuayuan	320	梅花园	Baiyun District		Island	Underground	30 October 2010
Jingxi Nanfang Hospital	321	京溪南方医院	Baiyun District		Island	Underground	30 October 2010
Tonghe	322	同和	Baiyun District		Island	Underground	30 October 2010
Yongtai	323	永泰	Baiyun District		Island	Underground	30 October 2010
Baiyundadaobei	324	白云大道北	Baiyun District		Island	Underground	30 October 2010
Jiahewanggang	325	嘉禾望岗	Baiyun District	2 14	Dual-island	Underground	30 October 2010
Longgui	326	龙归	Baiyun District		Island	Underground	30 October 2010
Renhe	327	人和	Baiyun District		Island	Underground	30 October 2010
Gaozeng	328	高增	Baiyun District	9	Island	Underground	28 December 2017
Airport South	329	机场南	Huadu District	ER	Side	Underground	30 October 2010
Airport North	330	机场北	Huadu District	ER	Side	Underground	26 April 2018
Spur line
Shipaiqiao	312	石牌桥	Tianhe District		Island	Underground	30 December 2006
Gangding	313	岗顶	Tianhe District		Island	Underground	30 December 2006
South China Normal University	314	华师	Tianhe District	11	Island	Underground	30 December 2006
Wushan	315	五山	Tianhe District		Island	Underground	30 December 2006
Tianhe Coach Terminal	316	天河客运站	Tianhe District	6	Side	Underground	30 December 2006

== Line 4 ==
Stations of Line 4, Guangzhou Metro
Station	Station No.	Chinese name	Location	Transfers	Platform type	Grade	Opened
Nansha Passenger Port	401	南沙客运港	Nansha District		Side	Underground	28 December 2017
Nanheng	402	南横	Nansha District		Island	Underground	28 December 2017
Tangkeng	403	塘坑	Nansha District		Island	Underground	28 December 2017
Dachong	404	大涌	Nansha District		Island	Underground	28 December 2017
Guanglong	405	广隆	Nansha District		Island	Underground	28 December 2017
Feishajiao	406	飞沙角	Nansha District		Island	Underground	28 December 2017
Jinzhou	407	金洲	Nansha District		Side	Elevated	28 June 2007
Jiaomen	408	蕉门	Nansha District		Side	Elevated	28 June 2007
Huangge	409	黄阁	Nansha District		Side/island hybrid	Elevated	30 December 2006
Huangge Auto Town	410	黄阁汽车城	Nansha District		Side	Elevated	30 December 2006
Qingsheng	411	庆盛	Nansha District		Side	Elevated	28 December 2017
Dongchong	412	东涌	Nansha District		Side	Elevated	30 December 2006
Dichong	413	低涌	Panyu District		Side	Elevated	30 December 2006
Haibang	414	海傍	Panyu District	3	Side	Elevated	30 December 2006
Shiqi	415	石碁	Panyu District		Side	Elevated	30 December 2006
Guanqiao	416	官桥	Panyu District	GH	Side	Elevated	2026
Xinzao	417	新造	Panyu District		Island	Underground	26 December 2005
Higher Education Mega Center South	418	大学城南	Panyu District	7 12	Side	Underground	26 December 2005
Higher Education Mega Center North	419	大学城北	Panyu District	12	Side/island hybrid	Underground	26 December 2005
Guanzhou	420	官洲	Haizhu District	12	Island	Underground	26 December 2005
Wanshengwei	421	万胜围	Haizhu District	8 THZ1	Island	Underground	26 December 2005
Chebeinan	422	车陂南	Tianhe District	5	Island	Underground	28 December 2009
Chebei	423	车陂	Tianhe District	13	Island	Underground	25 September 2010
Huangcun	424	黄村	Tianhe District	21	Island/side hybrid	Underground	25 September 2010

== Line 5 ==
Stations of Line 5, Guangzhou Metro
Station	Station No.	Chinese name	Location	Transfers	Platform type	Grade	Opened
Jiaokou	501	滘口	Liwan District		Island	Elevated	28 December 2009
Tanwei	502	坦尾	Liwan District	6	Island	Elevated	28 December 2009
Zhongshanba	503	中山八	Liwan District	11	Island	Underground	28 December 2009
Xichang	504	西场	Liwan District		Split	Underground	28 December 2009
Xicun	505	西村	Liwan District	8	Split	Underground	28 December 2009
Guangzhou Railway Station	506	广州火车站	Yuexiu District	2 11 14	Split	Underground	28 December 2009
Xiaobei	507	小北	Yuexiu District		Split	Underground	28 December 2009
Taojin	508	淘金	Yuexiu District		Island	Underground	28 December 2009
Ouzhuang	509	区庄	Yuexiu District	6	Split	Underground	28 December 2009
Zoo	510	动物园	Yuexiu District		Stacked side	Underground	28 December 2009
Yangji	511	杨箕	Yuexiu District	1	Island	Underground	28 December 2009
Wuyangcun	512	五羊邨	Yuexiu District	10	Island	Underground	28 December 2009
Zhujiang New Town	513	珠江新城	Tianhe District	3	Side	Underground	28 December 2009
Liede	514	猎德	Tianhe District		Island	Underground	28 December 2009
Tancun	515	潭村	Tianhe District		Island	Underground	28 December 2009
Yuancun	516	员村	Tianhe District	11	Island	Underground	28 December 2009
Keyun Lu	517	科韵路	Tianhe District		Island	Underground	28 December 2009
Chebeinan	518	车陂南	Tianhe District	4	Island	Underground	28 December 2009
Dongpu	519	东圃	Tianhe District		Island	Underground	28 December 2009
Sanxi	520	三溪	Tianhe District		Island	Underground	28 December 2009
Yuzhu	521	鱼珠	Huangpu District	13	Island	Underground	28 December 2009
Dashadi	522	大沙地	Huangpu District		Island	Underground	28 December 2009
Dashadong	523	大沙东	Huangpu District	7	Island	Underground	28 December 2009
Wenchong	524	文冲	Huangpu District		Island	Underground	28 December 2009
Shuangsha	525	双沙	Huangpu District		Island	Underground	28 December 2023
Miaotou	526	庙头	Huangpu District		Island	Underground	28 December 2023
Xiayuan	527	夏园	Huangpu District	13	Island	Underground	28 December 2023
Baoying Dadao	528	保盈大道	Huangpu District		Island	Underground	28 December 2023
Xiagang	529	夏港	Huangpu District		Island	Underground	28 December 2023
Huangpu New Port	530	黄埔新港	Huangpu District		Side	Underground	28 December 2023

== Line 6 ==
Stations of Line 6, Guangzhou Metro
Station	Station No.	Chinese name	Location	Transfers	Platform type	Grade	Opened
Xunfenggang	601	浔峰岗	Baiyun District	12	Island/side hybrid	Elevated	28 December 2013
Hengsha	602	横沙	Baiyun District		Side	Elevated	28 December 2013
Shabei	603	沙贝	Baiyun District		Side	Elevated	28 December 2013
Hesha	604	河沙	Liwan District		Island	Underground	28 December 2013
Tanwei	605	坦尾	Liwan District	5	Side	Underground	28 December 2013
Ruyifang	606	如意坊	Liwan District	11	Island	Underground	28 December 2013
Huangsha	607	黄沙	Liwan District	1	Island	Underground	28 December 2013
Cultural Park	608	文化公园	Liwan District	8	Island	Underground	28 December 2013
Yide Lu	609	一德路	Yuexiu District		Split	Underground	28 January 2015
Haizhu Square	610	海珠广场	Yuexiu District	2	Split	Underground	28 December 2013
Beijing Lu	611	北京路	Yuexiu District		Island	Underground	28 December 2013
Tuanyida Square	612	团一大广场	Yuexiu District		Split	Underground	28 December 2013
Donghu	613	东湖	Yuexiu District	10 12	Island	Underground	28 December 2013
Dongshankou	614	东山口	Yuexiu District	1	Split	Underground	28 December 2013
Ouzhuang	615	区庄	Yuexiu District	5	Split	Underground	28 December 2013
Huanghuagang	616	黄花岗	Yuexiu District		Split	Underground	28 December 2013
Shaheding	617	沙河顶	Tianhe District		Island	Underground	28 December 2013
Shahe	618	沙河	Tianhe District	11	Split	Underground	28 December 2024
Tianpingjia	619	天平架	Tianhe District		Island	Underground	28 December 2013
Yantang	620	燕塘	Tianhe District	3	Island	Underground	28 December 2013
Tianhe Coach Terminal	621	天河客运站	Tianhe District	3	Island	Underground	28 December 2013
Changban	622	长湴	Tianhe District		Island	Underground	28 December 2013
Botanical Garden	623	植物园	Tianhe District		Dual-island	Underground	28 June 2017
Longdong	624	龙洞	Tianhe District		Island	Underground	28 December 2016
Kemulang	625	柯木塱	Tianhe District		Island	Underground	28 June 2017
Gaotangshi	626	高塘石	Tianhe District		Island	Underground	28 December 2016
Huangbei	627	黄陂	Huangpu District		Island	Underground	28 December 2016
Jinfeng	628	金峰	Huangpu District		Island	Underground	28 December 2016
Xiangang	629	暹岗	Huangpu District		Island	Underground	28 December 2016
Suyuan	630	苏元	Huangpu District	21	Island	Underground	28 December 2016
Luogang	631	萝岗	Huangpu District	7 THP1	Island	Underground	28 December 2016
Xiangxue	632	香雪	Huangpu District	THP1 THP2	Island	Underground	28 December 2016

== Line 7 ==
Stations of Line 7, Guangzhou Metro
Station	Station No.	Chinese name	Location	Transfers	Platform type	Grade	Opened
Meidi Dadao	701-8	美的大道	Shunde District, Foshan		Side	Underground	1 May 2022
Beijiao Park	701-7	北滘公园	Shunde District, Foshan	3	Triple-Island	Underground	1 May 2022
Midea	701-6	美的	Shunde District, Foshan		Island	Underground	1 May 2022
Nanchong	701-5	南涌	Shunde District, Foshan		Island	Underground	1 May 2022
Jinlong	701-4	锦龙	Shunde District, Foshan		Island	Underground	1 May 2022
Chencun	701-3	陈村	Shunde District, Foshan		Island	Underground	1 May 2022
Chencunbei	701-2	陈村北	Shunde District, Foshan		Island	Underground	1 May 2022
Dazhou	701-1	大洲	Panyu District		Island	Underground	1 May 2022
Guangzhou South Railway Station	701	广州南站	Panyu District	2 22 2	Dual-Side/Island hybrid	Underground	28 December 2016
Shibi	702	石壁	Panyu District	2	Dual-Island	Underground	28 December 2016
Xiecun	703	谢村	Panyu District		Island	Underground	28 December 2016
Zhongcun	704	钟村	Panyu District		Island	Underground	28 December 2016
Hanxi Changlong	705	汉溪长隆	Panyu District	3	Island	Underground	28 December 2016
Nancun Wanbo	706	南村万博	Panyu District	18	Island	Underground	28 December 2016
Yuangang	707	员岗	Panyu District		Island	Underground	28 December 2016
Banqiao	708	板桥	Panyu District		Island	Underground	28 December 2016
Higher Education Mega Center South	709	大学城南	Panyu District	4 12	Island	Underground	28 December 2016
Shenjing	710	深井	Huangpu District		Island	Underground	28 December 2023
Changzhou	711	长洲	Huangpu District		Island	Underground	28 December 2023
Hongshengsha	712	洪圣沙	Huangpu District		Island	Underground	TBD
Yufengwei	713	裕丰围	Huangpu District	13	Island	Underground	28 December 2023
Dashadong	714	大沙东	Huangpu District	5	Island	Underground	28 December 2023
Jitang	715	姬堂	Huangpu District		Island	Underground	28 December 2023
Jiazhuang	716	加庄	Huangpu District		Island	Underground	28 December 2023
Kefeng Lu	717	科丰路	Huangpu District		Island	Underground	28 December 2023
Luogang	718	萝岗	Huangpu District	6 THP1	Island	Underground	28 December 2023
Shuixi	719	水西	Huangpu District	21 THP1	Island	Underground	28 December 2023
Yanshan	720	燕山	Huangpu District		Side	Underground	28 December 2023

== Line 8 ==
Stations of Line 8, Guangzhou Metro
Station	Station No.	Chinese name	Location	Transfers	Platform type	Grade	Opened
Jiaoxin	801	滘心	Baiyun District		Side	Underground	26 November 2020
Tinggang	802	亭岗	Baiyun District		Island	Underground	26 November 2020
Shijing	803	石井	Baiyun District		Island	Underground	26 November 2020
Xiaoping	804	小坪	Baiyun District		Island	Underground	26 November 2020
Shitan	805	石潭	Baiyun District		Island	Underground	26 November 2020
Julong	806	聚龙	Baiyun District	12	Island	Underground	26 November 2020
Shangbu	807	上步	Baiyun District		Island	Underground	26 November 2020
Tongde	808	同德	Baiyun District		Island	Underground	26 November 2020
Ezhangtan	809	鹅掌坦	Baiyun District		Island	Underground	26 November 2020
Xicun	810	西村	Liwan District	5	Island	Underground	28 December 2022
Caihong Bridge	811	彩虹桥	Liwan District	11	Spanish solution	Underground	28 December 2022
Chen Clan Academy	812	陈家祠	Liwan District	1	Island	Underground	26 November 2020
Hualinsi Buddhist Temple	813	华林寺	Liwan District		Island	Underground	26 November 2020
Cultural Park	814	文化公园	Liwan District	6	Split	Underground	28 December 2019
Tongfuxi	815	同福西	Haizhu District		Split	Underground	28 December 2019
Fenghuang Xincun	816	凤凰新村	Haizhu District		Split	Underground	3 November 2010
Shayuan	817	沙园	Haizhu District	Guangfo	Dual-island	Underground	3 November 2010
Baogang Dadao	818	宝岗大道	Haizhu District		Island	Underground	3 November 2010
Changgang	819	昌岗	Haizhu District	2	Island	Underground	25 September 2010
Xiaogang	820	晓港	Haizhu District		Island	Underground	29 December 2002
Sun Yat-sen University	821	中大	Haizhu District		Island	Underground	28 June 2003
Lujiang	822	鹭江	Haizhu District		Island	Underground	28 June 2003
Kecun	823	客村	Haizhu District	3	Island	Underground	28 June 2003
Chigang	824	赤岗	Haizhu District	12	Island	Underground	28 June 2003
Modiesha	825	磨碟沙	Haizhu District	18	Side	Underground	28 June 2003
Xingangdong	826	新港东	Haizhu District		Side	Underground	28 June 2003
Pazhou	827	琶洲	Haizhu District	11	Side	Underground	28 June 2003
Wanshengwei	828	万胜围	Haizhu District	4 THZ1	Side	Underground	26 December 2005

== Line 9 ==
Stations of Line 9, Guangzhou Metro
Station	Station No.	Chinese name	Location	Transfers	Platform type	Grade	Opened
Fei'eling	901	飞鹅岭	Huadu District		Island	Underground	28 December 2017
Huadu Autocity	902	花都汽车城	Huadu District		Island	Underground	28 December 2017
Guangzhou North Railway Station	903	广州北站	Huadu District		Island	Underground	28 December 2017
Huachenglu	904	花城路	Huadu District		Island	Underground	28 December 2017
Huaguoshan Park	905	花果山公园	Huadu District		Island	Underground	28 December 2017
Huadu Square	906	花都广场	Huadu District		Island	Underground	28 December 2017
Ma'anshan Park	907	马鞍山公园	Huadu District		Island	Underground	28 December 2017
Liantang	908	莲塘	Huadu District		Island	Underground	28 December 2017
Qingbu	909	清㘵	Huadu District		Island	Underground	28 December 2017
Qingtang	910	清塘	Huadu District		Island	Underground	30 June 2018
Gaozeng	911	高增	Baiyun District	3	Island	Underground	28 December 2017

== Line 10 ==
Stations of Line 10, Guangzhou Metro
Station	Station No.	Chinese name	Location	Transfers	Platform type	Grade	Opened
Xilang	1001	西塱	Liwan District	1 22 Guangfo	Side	Underground	29 June 2025
Huawei	1002	花围	Liwan District		Dual-Island	Underground	29 June 2025
Dongsha	1003	东沙	Liwan District		Island	Underground	29 June 2025
Daganwei	1004	大干围	Haizhu District		Island	Underground	29 June 2025
Gongye Avenue South	1005	工业大道南	Haizhu District		Island	Underground	29 June 2025
Dongxiao South	1006	东晓南	Haizhu District	2	Island	Underground	29 June 2025
Wufeng	1007	五凤	Haizhu District	11	Island	Underground	29 June 2025
Sun Yat-sen University South Gate	1008	中大南门	Haizhu District		Island	Underground	29 December 2025
Binjiang East Road	1009	滨江东路	Haizhu District		Island	Underground	29 June 2025
Donghu	1010	东湖	Yuexiu District	6 12	Island	Underground	29 June 2025
Wuyangcun	1011	五羊邨	Yuexiu District	5	Island	Underground	29 June 2025
Yangji East	1012	杨箕东	Tianhe District		Island	Underground	29 June 2025

== Line 11 ==
Stations of Line 11, Guangzhou Metro
Station	Station No.	Chinese name	Location	Transfers	Platform type	Grade	Opened
↑ towards Longtan ↑
Chisha	1101	赤沙	Haizhu District	12	Dual-Island	Underground	28 December 2024
Pazhou	1102	琶洲	Haizhu District	8	Island	Underground	28 December 2024
Yuancun	1103	员村	Tianhe District	5	Island	Underground	20 December 2019
Tianhe Park	1104	天河公园	Tianhe District	13 21	Dual-Island	Underground	20 December 2019
Huajing Road	1105	华景路	Tianhe District		Island	Underground	28 December 2024
South China Normal University	1106	华师	Tianhe District	3	Split	Underground	28 December 2024
Longkou West	1107	龙口西	Tianhe District		Island	Underground	28 December 2024
Guangzhou East Railway Station	1108	广州东站	Tianhe District	1 3	Island	Underground	29 September 2025
Shahe	1109	沙河	Tianhe District	6	Island	Underground	28 December 2024
Yuntai Garden	1110	云台花园	Yuexiu District		Island	Underground	28 December 2024
Dajinzhong Road	1111	大金钟路	Tianhe District		Island	Underground	28 December 2024
Guangzhou University of Chinese Medicine	1112	中医药大学	Tianhe District	12	Island	Underground	28 December 2024
Ziyuangang	1113	梓元岗	Tianhe District		Split	Underground	28 December 2024
Guangzhou Railway Station	1114	广州火车站	Yuexiu District	2 5 14	Split	Underground	TBD
Liuhua	1115	流花	Yuexiu District		Island	Underground	28 December 2024
Caihong Bridge	1116	彩虹桥	Liwan District	8	Dual-Island	Underground	28 December 2024
Zhongshanba	1117	中山八	Liwan District	5	Island	Underground	28 December 2024
Ruyifang	1118	如意坊	Liwan District	6	Island	Underground	28 December 2024
Shiweitang	1119	石围塘	Liwan District		Island	Underground	28 December 2024
Fangcun	1120	芳村	Liwan District	1 22	Island	Underground	28 December 2024
Dachongkou	1121	大冲口	Liwan District		Island	Underground	28 December 2024
Shachong	1122	沙涌	Liwan District	Guangfo	Island	Underground	28 December 2024
Hedong East	1123	鹤洞东	Liwan District		Island	Underground	28 December 2024
Diyuan	1124	棣园	Haizhu District		Island	Underground	28 December 2024
Yangang	1125	燕岗	Haizhu District	Guangfo	Island	Underground	28 December 2024
Jiangtai Road	1126	江泰路	Haizhu District	2	Island	Underground	28 December 2024
Wufeng	1127	五凤	Haizhu District	10	Island	Underground	28 December 2024
Yijing Road	1128	逸景路	Haizhu District		Island	Underground	28 December 2024
Shangchong	1129	上涌	Haizhu District		Island	Underground	28 December 2024
Datang	1130	大塘	Haizhu District	3	Island	Underground	28 December 2024
Longtan	1131	龙潭	Haizhu District	18	Island	Underground	28 December 2024
↓ towards Chisha ↓

== Line 12 ==
Stations of Line 12, Guangzhou Metro
Station	Station No.	Chinese name	Location	Transfers	Platform type	Grade	Opened
Xunfenggang	1201	浔峰岗	Baiyun District	6	Side	Underground	29 June 2025
Xunfenggang North	1202	浔峰岗北	Baiyun District		Island	Underground	29 June 2025
Xizhou	1203	西洲	Baiyun District		Island	Underground	29 June 2025
Julong	1204	聚龙	Baiyun District	8	Island	Underground	29 June 2025
Guangzhou Baiyun Railway Station	1205	广州白云站	Baiyun District		Triple-Island	Underground	29 June 2025
Tangchong	1206	棠涌	Baiyun District		Island	Underground	29 June 2025
Xinshixu	1207	新市墟	Baiyun District	14	Island	Underground	29 June 2025
Baiyun Culture Square	1208	白云文化广场	Baiyun District	2	Island	Underground	29 June 2025
Guangzhou Gymnasium	1209	广州体育馆	Baiyun District		Island	Underground	29 June 2025
Jingtai	1210	景泰	Baiyun District		Island	Underground	TBD
Keziling	1211	柯子岭	Baiyun District		Island	Underground	TBD
Guangzhou University of Chinese Medicine	1212	中医药大学	Baiyun District	11	Island	Underground	TBD
Luhu Lake	1213	麓湖	Yuexiu District		Island	Underground	TBD
Jianshe 6th Road	1214	建设六马路	Yuexiu District		Island	Underground	TBD
Martyrs' Park	1215	烈士陵园	Yuexiu District	1	Island	Underground	TBD
Donghu	1216	东湖	Yuexiu District	6 10	Island	Underground	TBD
Ersha Island	1217	二沙岛	Yuexiu District		Island/side hybrid	Underground	29 June 2025
Chigang Pagoda	1218	赤岗塔	Haizhu District		Dual-Island	Underground	29 June 2025
Chigang	1219	赤岗	Haizhu District	8	Island	Underground	13 February 2026
Chisha North	1220	赤沙北	Haizhu District		Island	Underground	29 June 2025
Chisha	1221	赤沙	Haizhu District	11	Dual-Island	Underground	29 June 2025
Beishan	1222	北山	Haizhu District		Island	Underground	29 June 2025
Guanzhou	1223	官洲	Haizhu District	4	Island	Underground	29 June 2025
Higher Education Mega Center North	1224	大学城北	Panyu District	4	Dual-Island	Underground	29 June 2025
Higher Education Mega Center South	1225	大学城南	Panyu District	4 7	Island	Underground	29 June 2025

== Line 13 ==
Stations of Line 13, Guangzhou Metro
Station	Station No.	Chinese name	Location	Transfers	Platform type	Grade	Opened
Tianhe Park	1320	天河公园	Tianhe District	11 21	Spanish solution	Underground	29 September 2025
Tangxia	1321	棠下	Tianhe District		Island	Underground	29 September 2025
Chebei	1322	车陂	Tianhe District	4	Split	Underground	29 September 2025
Tianhe Zhucun	1323	天河珠村	Tianhe District		Split	Underground	29 September 2025
Yuzhu	1324	鱼珠	Huangpu District	5	Side	Underground	28 December 2017
Yufengwei	1325	裕丰围	Huangpu District	7	Island	Underground	28 December 2017
Shuanggang	1326	双岗	Huangpu District		Island	Underground	28 December 2017
Nanhai God Temple	1327	南海神庙	Huangpu District		Island	Underground	28 December 2017
Xiayuan	1328	夏园	Huangpu District	5	Island	Underground	28 December 2017
Nangang	1329	南岗	Huangpu District		Island	Underground	28 December 2017
Shacun	1330	沙村	Zengcheng District		Island	Underground	28 December 2017
Baijiang	1331	白江	Zengcheng District		Island	Underground	28 December 2017
Xintang	1332	新塘	Zengcheng District		Island	Underground	28 December 2017
Guanhu	1333	官湖	Zengcheng District		Island	Underground	28 December 2017
Xinsha	1334	新沙	Zengcheng District		Island	Underground	28 December 2017

== Line 14 ==
Stations of Line 14, Guangzhou Metro
Station	Station No.	Chinese name	Location	Transfers	Platform type	Grade	Opened
Main Line
Guangzhou Railway Station	1401	广州火车站	Yuexiu District	2 5 11	TBD	Underground	TBD
Lejia Road	1402	乐嘉路	Baiyun District		Side	Underground	29 September 2025
Yunxiao Road	1403	云霄路	Baiyun District		Island	Underground	29 September 2025
Xinshixu	1404	新市墟	Baiyun District	12	Island	Underground	29 September 2025
Mawu	1405	马务	Baiyun District		Island	Underground	29 September 2025
Hebian	1406	鹤边	Baiyun District		Island	Underground	29 September 2025
Helong	1407	鹤龙	Baiyun District		Island	Underground	29 September 2025
Pengbian	1408	彭边	Baiyun District		Island	Underground	29 September 2025
Jiahewanggang	1409	嘉禾望岗	Baiyun District	2 3	Island	Underground	28 December 2018
Baiyun Dongping	1410	白云东平	Baiyun District		Island	Underground	28 December 2018
Xialiang	1411	夏良	Baiyun District		Island	Underground	28 December 2018
Taihe	1412	太和	Baiyun District		Island	Underground	28 December 2018
Zhuliao	1413	竹料	Baiyun District		Side	Elevated	28 December 2018
Zhongluotan	1414	钟落潭	Baiyun District		Dual-Island	Elevated	28 December 2018
Mali	1415	马沥	Baiyun District		Side	Elevated	28 December 2018
Xinhe	1416	新和	Baiyun District		Dual-Island	Elevated	28 December 2017
Taiping	1417	太平	Conghua District		Dual-Island	Elevated	28 December 2018
Shengang	1418	神岗	Conghua District		Side	Elevated	28 December 2018
Chicao	1419	赤草	Conghua District		Dual-Island	Elevated	28 December 2018
Conghua Coach Terminal	1420	从化客运站	Conghua District		Island	Underground	28 December 2018
Dongfeng	1421	东风	Conghua District		Dual-Island	Underground	28 December 2018
Knowledge City Branch Line
Xinhe	1414	新和	Baiyun District		Dual-Island	Elevated	28 December 2017
Hongwei	1422	红卫	Huangpu District		Island	Underground	28 December 2017
Xinnan	1423	新南	Huangpu District		Island	Underground	28 December 2017
Fengxia	1424	枫下	Huangpu District		Island	Underground	28 December 2017
Sino-Singapore Guangzhou Knowledge City	1425	知识城	Huangpu District		Island	Underground	28 December 2017
Hetangxia	1426	何棠下	Huangpu District		Island	Underground	28 December 2017
Wangcun	1427	旺村	Huangpu District		Island	Underground	28 December 2017
Tangcun	1428	汤村	Huangpu District		Island	Underground	28 December 2017
Zhenlongbei	1429	镇龙北	Huangpu District		Island	Underground	28 December 2017
Zhenlong	1430	镇龙	Huangpu District	21	Dual-Island	Underground	28 December 2017

== Line 18 ==
Stations of Line 18, Guangzhou Metro
Station	Station No.	Chinese name	Location	Transfers	Platform type	Grade	Opened
Wanqingsha	1801	万顷沙	Nansha District		Island	Underground	28 September 2021
Hengli	1802	横沥	Nansha District		Island	Underground	28 September 2021
Panyu Square	1803	番禺广场	Panyu District	3 22	Dual-island	Underground	28 September 2021
Nancun Wanbo	1804	南村万博	Panyu District	7	Island	Underground	28 September 2021
Shaxi	1805	沙溪	Panyu District		Island	Underground	28 September 2021
Longtan	1806	龙潭	Haizhu District	11	Island	Underground	28 September 2021
Modiesha	1807	磨碟沙	Haizhu District	8	Island	Underground	28 September 2021
Xiancun	1808	冼村	Tianhe District		Island	Underground	28 September 2021

== Line 21 ==
Stations of Line 21, Guangzhou Metro
Station	Station No.	Chinese name	Location	Transfers	Platform type	Grade	Opened
Tianhe Park	2102	天河公园	Tianhe District	11 13	Dual-Island	Underground	20 December 2019
Tangdong	2103	棠东	Tianhe District		Island	Underground	20 December 2019
Huangcun	2104	黄村	Tianhe District	4	Island	Underground	20 December 2019
Daguannanlu	2105	大观南路	Tianhe District		Island	Underground	20 December 2019
Tianhe Smart City	2106	天河智慧城	Tianhe District		Island	Underground	20 December 2019
Shenzhoulu	2107	神舟路	Huangpu District		Island	Underground	20 December 2019
Science City	2108	科学城	Huangpu District		Island	Underground	20 December 2019
Suyuan	2109	苏元	Huangpu District	6	Island	Underground	20 December 2019
Shuixi	2110	水西	Huangpu District	7 THP1	Island	Underground	20 December 2019
Changping	2111	长平	Huangpu District	THP1	Side	Elevated	20 December 2019
Jinkeng	2112	金坑	Huangpu District		Dual-Island	Elevated	20 December 2019
Zhenlongxi	2113	镇龙西	Huangpu District		Dual-Island	Underground	28 December 2018
Zhenlong	2114	镇龙	Huangpu District	14	Dual-Island	Underground	28 December 2018
Zhongxin	2115	中新	Zengcheng District		Island	Underground	28 December 2018
Kengbei	2116	坑贝	Zengcheng District		Island	Underground	28 December 2018
Fenggang	2117	凤岗	Zengcheng District		Island	Underground	28 December 2018
Zhucun	2118	朱村	Zengcheng District		Dual-Island	Elevated	28 December 2018
Shantian	2119	山田	Zengcheng District		Dual-Island	Elevated	28 December 2018
Zhonggang	2120	钟岗	Zengcheng District		Island	Underground	28 December 2018
Zengcheng Square	2121	增城广场	Zengcheng District		Island	Underground	28 December 2018

== Line 22 ==
Stations of Line 22, Guangzhou Metro
Station	Station No.	Chinese name	Location	Transfers	Platform type	Grade	Opened
Panyu Square	2201	番禺广场	Panyu District	3 18	Dual-island	Underground	31 March 2022
Shiguanglu	2202	市广路	Panyu District		Island	Underground	31 March 2022
Guangzhou South Railway Station	2203	广州南站	Panyu District	2 7 2	Island	Underground	31 March 2022
Chentougang	2204	陈头岗	Panyu District		Dual-island	Underground	31 March 2022
Nanpu West	2205	南浦西	Panyu District		Island	Underground	29 December 2025
Nanjiao	2206	南漖	Liwan District		Island	Underground	29 December 2025
Xilang	2207	西塱	Liwan District	1 10 Guangfo	Island	Underground	29 December 2025
Fangcun	2208	芳村	Liwan District	1 11	Island	Underground	29 December 2025

== Guangfo Line ==
Stations of Guangfo Line, Guangzhou Metro
Station	Station No.	Chinese name	Location	Transfers	Platform type	Grade	Opened
Xincheng Dong	GF01	新城东	Shunde District, Foshan		Island	Underground	28 December 2016
Dongping	GF02	东平	Shunde District, Foshan	3	Island	Underground	28 December 2016
Shijilian	GF03	世纪莲	Shunde District, Foshan		Island	Underground	28 December 2016
Lanshi	GF04	澜石	Chancheng District, Foshan		Island	Underground	28 December 2016
Kuiqi Lu	GF05	魁奇路	Chancheng District, Foshan	2	Island	Underground	3 November 2010
Jihua Park	GF06	季华园	Chancheng District, Foshan		Island	Underground	3 November 2010
Tongji Lu	GF07	同济路	Chancheng District, Foshan		Island	Underground	3 November 2010
Zumiao	GF08	祖庙	Chancheng District, Foshan		Island	Underground	3 November 2010
Pujun Beilu	GF09	普君北路	Chancheng District, Foshan		Island	Underground	3 November 2010
Chao'an	GF10	朝安	Chancheng District, Foshan		Island	Underground	3 November 2010
Guicheng	GF11	桂城	Nanhai District, Foshan	3	Island	Underground	3 November 2010
Nangui Lu	GF12	南桂路	Nanhai District, Foshan		Island	Underground	3 November 2010
Leigang	GF13	𧒽岗	Nanhai District, Foshan	TNH1	Island	Underground	3 November 2010
Qiandeng Lake	GF14	千灯湖	Nanhai District, Foshan		Island	Underground	3 November 2010
Financial Hi-Tech Zone	GF15	金融高新区	Nanhai District, Foshan		Island	Underground	3 November 2010
Longxi	GF16	龙溪	Liwan District, Guangzhou		Island	Underground	3 November 2010
Jushu	GF17	菊树	Liwan District, Guangzhou		Island	Underground	3 November 2010
Xilang	GF18	西塱	Liwan District, Guangzhou	1 10 22	Island	Underground	3 November 2010
Hedong	GF19	鹤洞	Liwan District, Guangzhou		Island	Underground	28 December 2015
Shachong	GF20	沙涌	Haizhu District, Guangzhou	11	Island	Underground	28 December 2015
Shayuan	GF21	沙园	Haizhu District, Guangzhou	8	Dual-Island	Underground	28 December 2015
Yangang	GF22	燕岗	Haizhu District, Guangzhou	11	Island	Underground	28 December 2015
Shixi	GF23	石溪	Haizhu District, Guangzhou		Island	Underground	28 December 2018
Nanzhou	GF24	南洲	Haizhu District, Guangzhou	2	Island	Underground	28 December 2018
Lijiao	GF25	沥滘	Haizhu District, Guangzhou	3	Side	Underground	28 December 2018

== APM Line ==
Stations of Zhujiang New Town Automated People Mover System
Station	Station No.	Chinese name	Location	Transfers	Platform type	Grade	Opened
Canton Tower	APM01	广州塔	Haizhu District	3 THZ1	Island	Underground	28 November 2010
Haixinsha	APM02	海心沙	Tianhe District		Island	Underground	24 February 2011
Guangzhou Opera House	APM03	大剧院	Tianhe District		Island	Underground	8 November 2010
Huacheng Dadao	APM04	花城大道	Tianhe District		Island	Underground	8 November 2010
Guangzhou Women and Children's Medical Center	APM05	妇儿中心	Tianhe District		Island	Underground	8 November 2010
Huangpu Dadao	APM06	黄埔大道	Tianhe District		Island	Underground	8 November 2010
Tianhenan	APM07	天河南	Tianhe District		Island	Underground	8 November 2010
Tianhe Sports Center South	APM08	体育中心南	Tianhe District		Island	Underground	8 November 2010
Linhexi	APM09	林和西	Tianhe District	3	Island	Underground	8 November 2010
