= Guangzhou Tram =

Tram system in Guangzhou, Guangdong Province, China

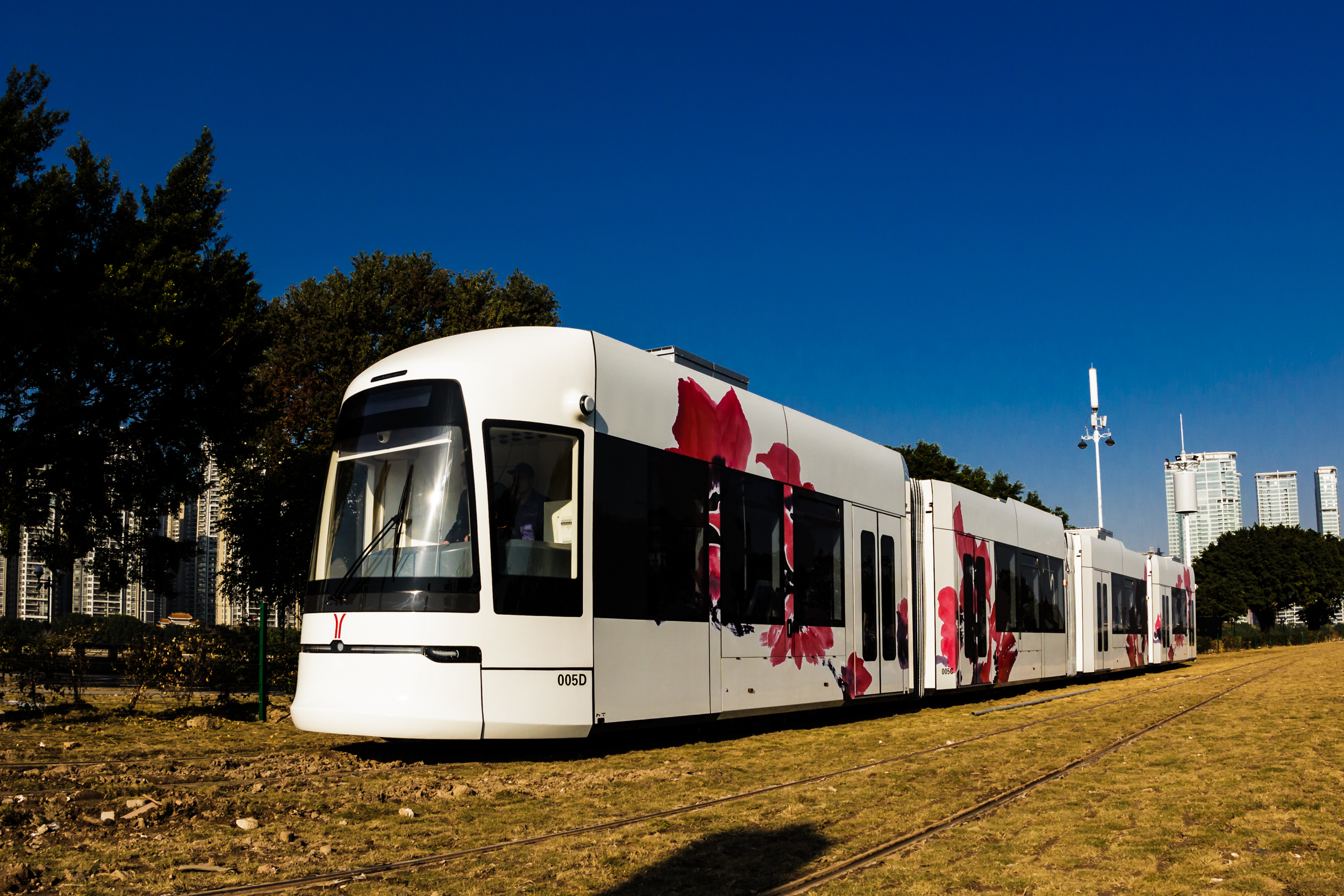
- A tram of Haizhu Tram Line 1

Overview
- Native name: 广州有轨电车
- Locale: Guangzhou, China
- Transit type: Tram
- Number of lines: 3
- Annual ridership: 3.544 million (2018)
- Website: Guangzhou Tram

Operation
- Began operation: December 31, 2014; 11 years ago
- Operator: Guangzhou Tram Corporation

Technical
- System length: 24.9 km (15.5 mi)

Guangzhou Tram (Chinese: 广州有轨电车; or "YoungTram") is the tram system in Guangzhou, Guangdong Province, China. It is operated by Guangzhou Tram Corporation, a wholly owned subsidiary of Guangzhou Metro Corporation.

== Lines ==
As of June 2025, 3 lines (Haizhu Tram, Huangpu Tram Line 1 and Huangpu Tram Line 2) are in operation. Several lines around Huangpu District, Zengcheng District, Guangzhou South Railway Station, Guangzhou Baiyun Airport and other places are being planned.

=== Haizhu ===
The main section of the Haizhu Island Circular New Tram (Chinese: 海珠环岛新型有轨电车; or THZ1) opened on 31 December 2014. The line is located on the northern shore of Haizhu Island and runs from Canton Tower station to Wanshengwei station, making a total of 9 stops and measuring 7 kilometers (4.3 mi) in length.

=== Huangpu ===
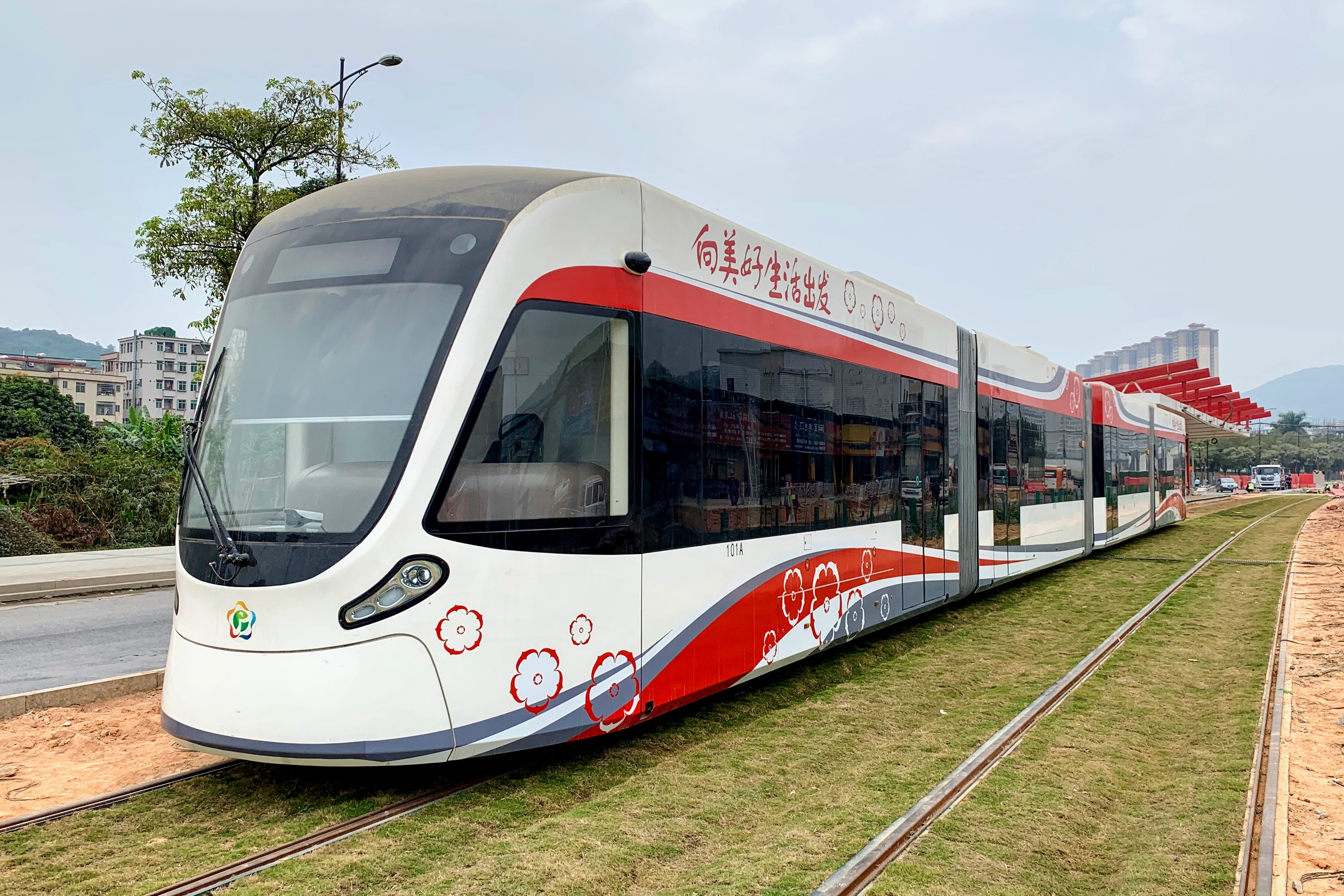
A tram of Huangpu Tram Line 1.

Construction of Huangpu's first tram line, Huangpu Tram Line 1 (Chinese: 黄埔有轨电车1号线), started in March 2018. It operates between Xiangxue and Xinfeng Lu (Chinese: 香雪-新丰路), connecting the Huangpu and Changlingju area. Trial operation without passengers started in September 2019. The initial section opened on 1 July 2020, with the remaining section opening on 28 December 2020.

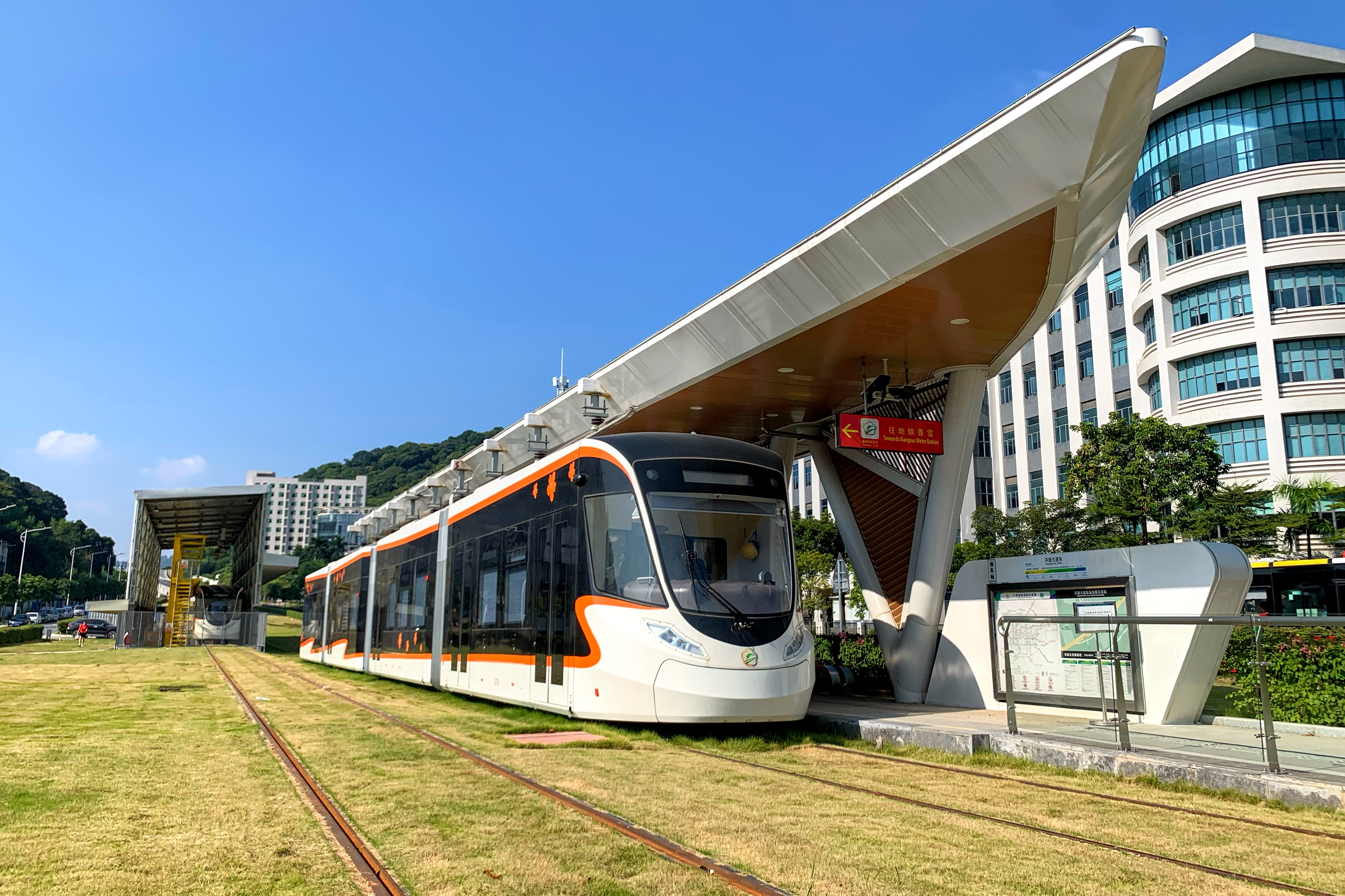
A tram of Huangpu Tram Line 2.

In addition to Line 1, construction of Huangpu Tram Line 2 (Chinese: 黄埔有轨电车2号线) started in December 2019, and the northern section between Xiangxue and Kaiyuan Road East with 4.9 kilometres (3.0 mi) and seven new stations opened on 20 June 2025. From there, a partly elevated extension of 9.5 kilometres (5.9 mi) with 12 stations, ending at Nangang station of metro line 13, is under construction. When finished Line 2 will operate between Xiangxue and Nangang (Chinese: 香雪-南岗), mainly serving residents of the subdistricts of Xiangxue, Yunpu and Dongqu.

According to a document released by the Huangpu District Government in 2017, 13 other tram lines are planned in the area.

== See also ==
- Guangzhou Metro
- Zhujiang New Town APM (Guangzhou Metro)
