= Nangang station (Guangzhou Metro) =

Guangzhou Metro station

Coordinates: 23°05′45.58″N 113°32′31.15″E

Nangang 南岗
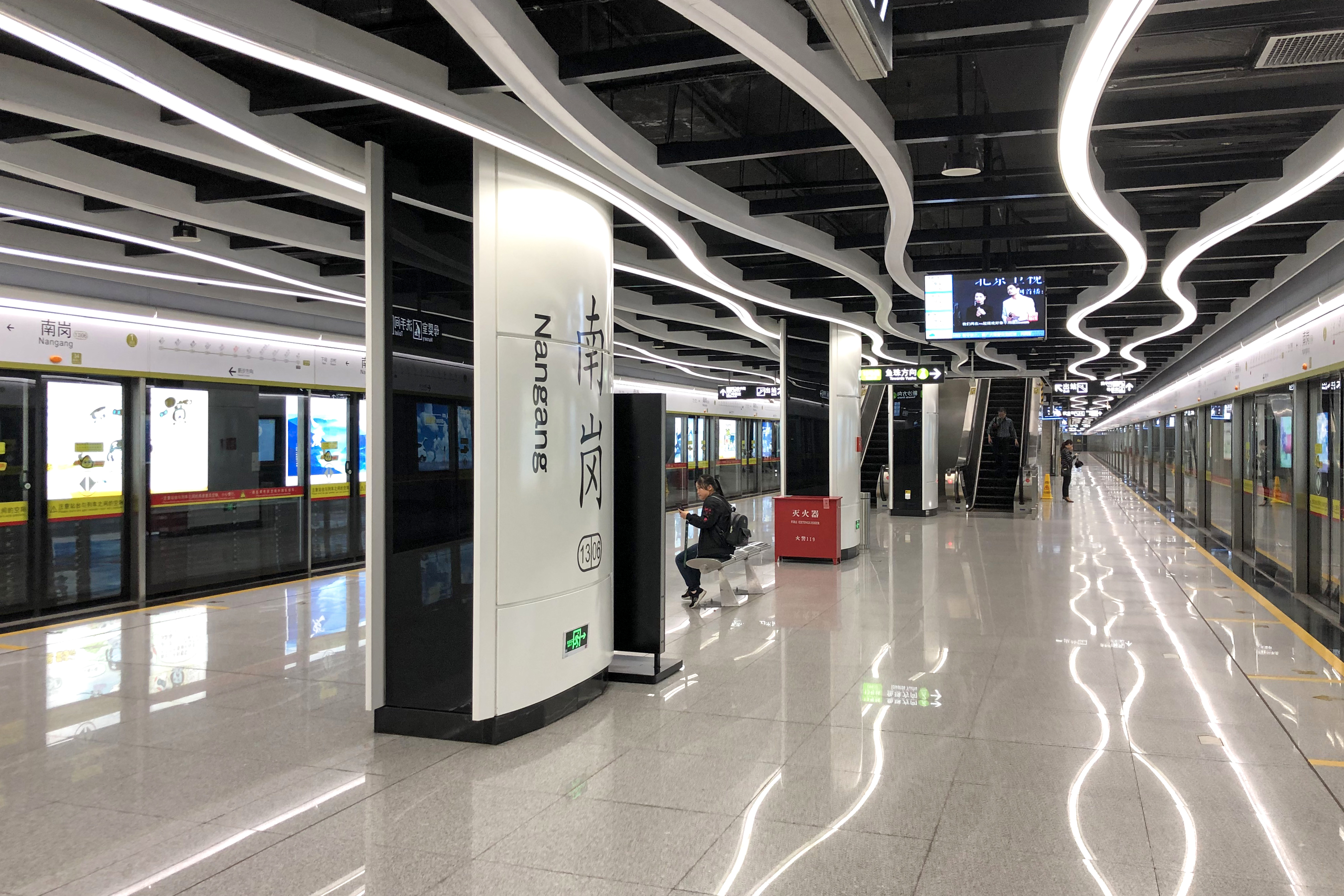

Chinese name
- Simplified Chinese: 南岗站
- Traditional Chinese: 南崗站
Transcriptions
Standard Mandarin
- Hanyu Pinyin: Nángǎng Zhàn
Yue: Cantonese
- Jyutping: naam^{4}gong^{1} zaam^{6}

General information
- Location: East Huangpu Road (G107) at Nangang Road (南岗路) and Xiangyuan Road (亨元路); Huangpu District, Guangzhou, Guangdong; China
- Operator: Guangzhou Metro Co. Ltd.
- Lines: Line 13; Huangpu Tram Line 2 (U/C)

Construction
- Structure type: Underground

Other information
- Station code: 1329 THP220

History
- Opened: 28 December 2017; 8 years ago

Services
Preceding station	Guangzhou Metro	Following station
Xiayuan towards Tianhe Park	Line 13	Shacun towards Xinsha
Future services
Nangangxu towards Xiangxue	Huangpu Tram Line 2	Terminus
Location

Nangang station (Chinese: 南岗站) is a station of Line 13 of the Guangzhou Metro. It started operations on 28 December 2017.

In the future, it will become an interchange to Huangpu Tram Line 2.

== Station layout ==
G	-	Exits
L1; Concourse	Lobby	Customer Service, Vending machines, ATMs
L2; Platforms	Platform 2	13 towards Tianhe Park (Xiayuan)
L2; Platforms	Island platform, doors will open on the left
L2; Platforms	Platform 1	13 towards Xinsha (Shacun)

== Exits ==
Exit number	Exit location
Exit C	Huangpu Donglu
Exit D	Huangpu Donglu
Exit E	Huangpu Donglu
