= Line 1 (Guangzhou Huangpu Tram) =

Tram line in Huangpu District, Guangzhou

Guangzhou Huangpu Tram Line 1
- THP1
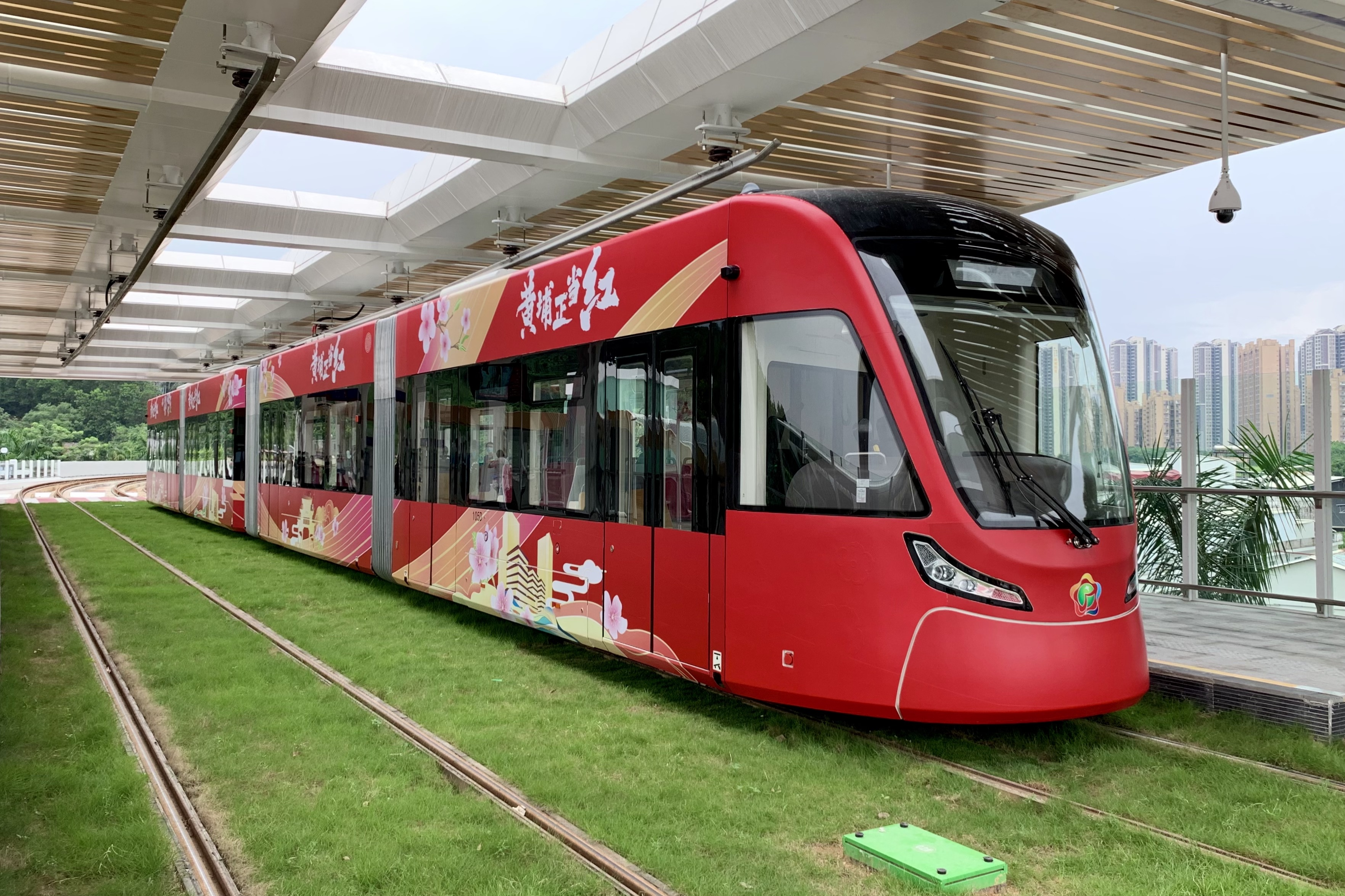

Overview
- Native name: 广州黄埔有轨电车1号线
- Owner: Guangzhou Development Zone Transport Investment Group
- Locale: Huangpu District, Guangzhou, Guangdong
- Termini: Xiangxue Subway Station; Xinfeng Lu
- Stations: 19 (in operation); 20 (future)

Service
- Type: Tram
- System: Guangzhou Trams
- Services: 1
- Operator(s): Guangzhou Tram Co., Ltd.
- Depot(s): Lingfu, Yuyan

History
- Opened: 1 July 2020; 5 years ago

Technical
- Line length: 14.3 km (8.9 mi)
- Number of tracks: 2
- Character: At-grade, elevated
- Track gauge: 1,435 mm (4 ft 8 1/2 in)

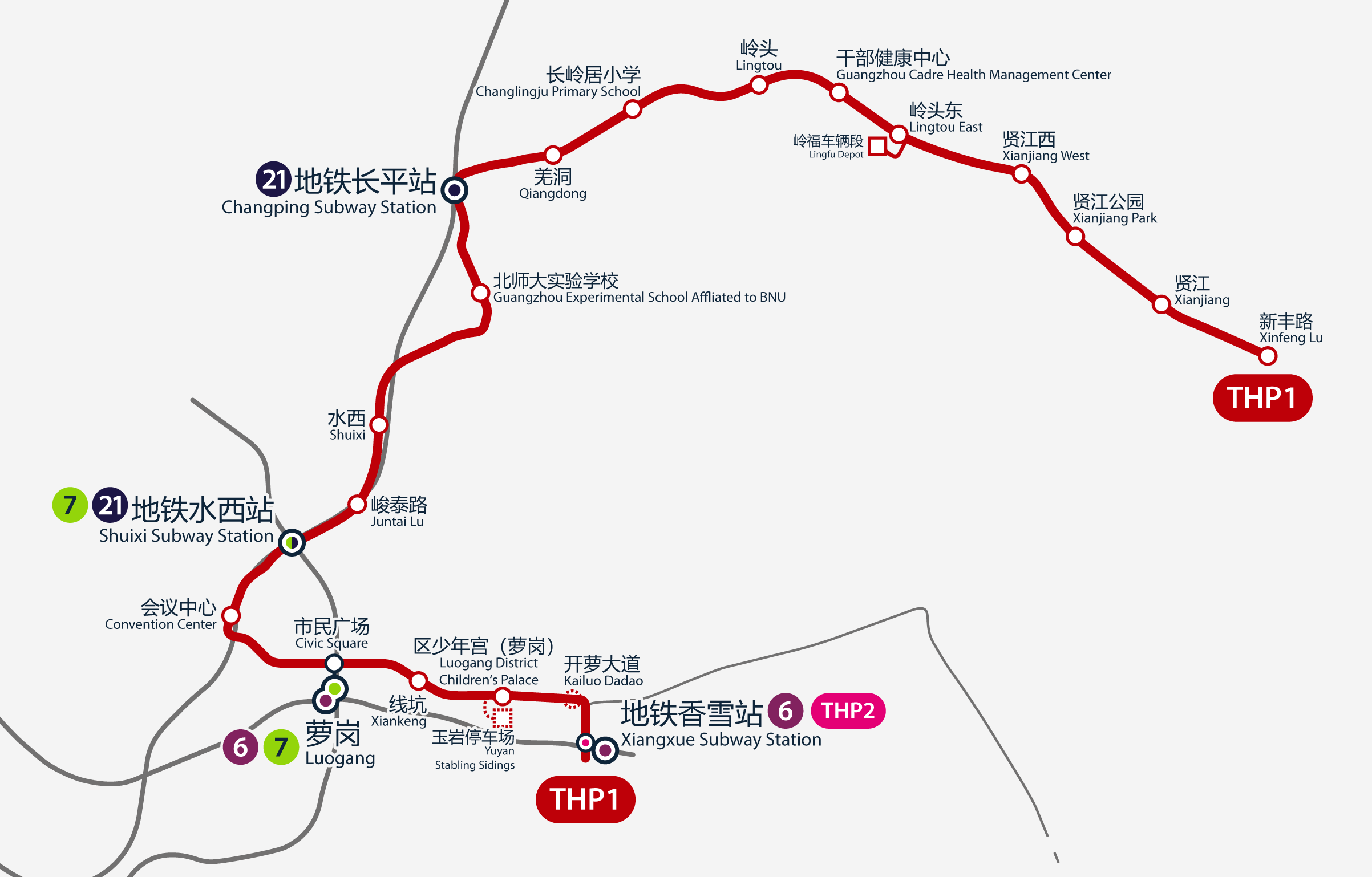
Map of Guangzhou Huangpu Tram Line 1

Guangzhou Huangpu Tram Line 1 (Chinese: 广州黄埔有轨电车1号线) is a tram line serving the Huangpu District of Guangzhou, operated by Guangzhou Trams. The initial section opened on 1 July 2020. The remaining section opened on 28 December 2020. It is 14.3 km (8.9 mi) in length with 20 stations, currently 19 stations are operational. It has connections with four Guangzhou Metro stations, Xiangxue, Shuixi, Luogang and Changping.

== Stations ==
Station №	Station name		Connections	Distance km	Location
Station №	English	Chinese	Connections	Distance km	Location
THP119	Xinfeng Lu	新丰路			Huangpu
THP118	Xianjiang	贤江			Huangpu
THP117	Xianjiang Park	贤江公园			Huangpu
THP116	Xianjiang West	贤江西			Huangpu
THP115	Lingtou East	岭头东			Huangpu
THP114	Guangzhou Cadre Health Management Center	干部健康中心			Huangpu
THP113	Lingtou	岭头			Huangpu
THP112	Changlingju Primary School	长岭居小学			Huangpu
THP111	Qiangdong	羌洞			Huangpu
THP110	Changping Subway Station	地铁长平站	21 2111		Huangpu
THP109	Guangzhou Experimental School Affiliated to BNU	北师大实验学校			Huangpu
THP108	Shuixi	水西			Huangpu
THP107	Juntai Lu	峻泰路			Huangpu
THP106	Shuixi Subway Station	地铁水西站	7 719 21 2110		Huangpu
THP105	Convention Center	会议中心			Huangpu
THP104	Civic Square	市民广场	Luogang: 6 631 7 718		Huangpu
THP103	Xiankeng	线坑			Huangpu
THP102	Luogang District Children's Palace	区少年宫（萝岗）			Huangpu
	Kailuo Dadao (reserved)	开萝大道			Huangpu
THP101	Xiangxue Subway Station	地铁香雪站	THP2 THP201; 6 632		Huangpu

== See also ==
- Guangzhou Tram
