= Shacun station =

Guangzhou Metro station

Coordinates: 23°06′38″N 113°34′13″E

Shacun 沙村
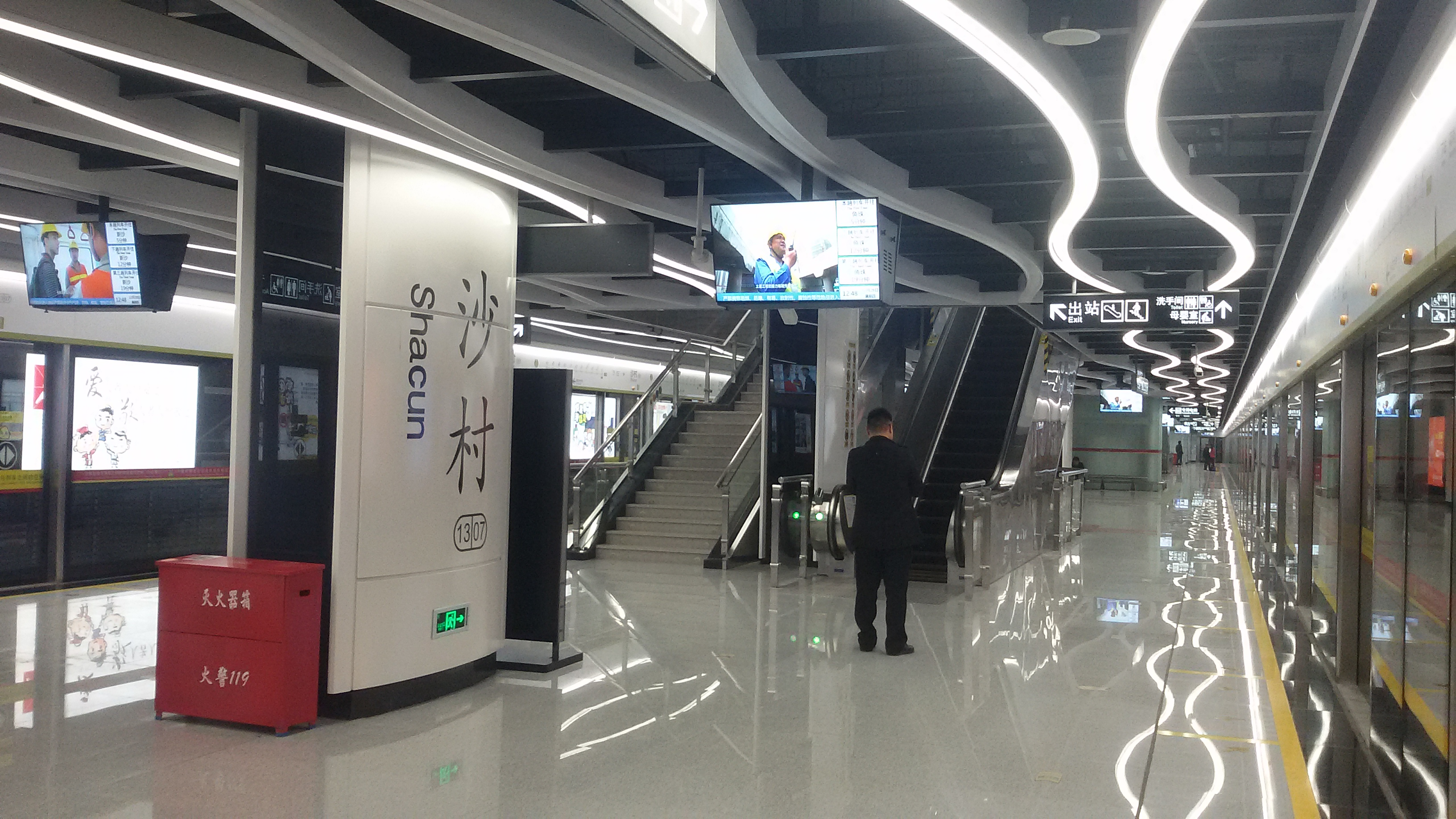

General information
- Location: West Xintang Avenue (新塘大道西); Xintang, Zengcheng District, Guangzhou, Guangdong; China
- Operator: Guangzhou Metro Co. Ltd.
- Line: Line 13

Construction
- Structure type: Underground

Other information
- Station code: 1330

History
- Opened: 28 December 2017; 8 years ago

Services
Preceding station	Guangzhou Metro	Following station
Nangang towards Tianhe Park	Line 13	Baijiang towards Xinsha
Location

Shacun station (Chinese: 沙村站; pinyin: Shācūn Zhàn; Jyutping: saa^{1}cyun^{1} zaam^{6}) is a station of Line 13 of the Guangzhou Metro. It started operations on 28 December 2017.

== Station layout ==
G	-	Exits
L1; Concourse	Lobby	Customer Service, Vending machines, ATMs
L2; Platforms	Platform 2	13 towards Tianhe Park (Nangang)
L2; Platforms	Island platform, doors will open on the left
L2; Platforms	Platform 1	13 towards Xinsha (Baijiang)

== Exits ==
Exit number		Exit location
Exit C	C1	Wenchong Donglu
Exit C	C2	Xintang Dadaoxi
Exit D		Xintang Dadaoxi
Exit E		Xintang Dadaoxi
