= Line 2 (Guangzhou Huangpu Tram) =

Tram line in Huangpu District, Guangzhou

Guangzhou Huangpu Tram Line 2
- THP2
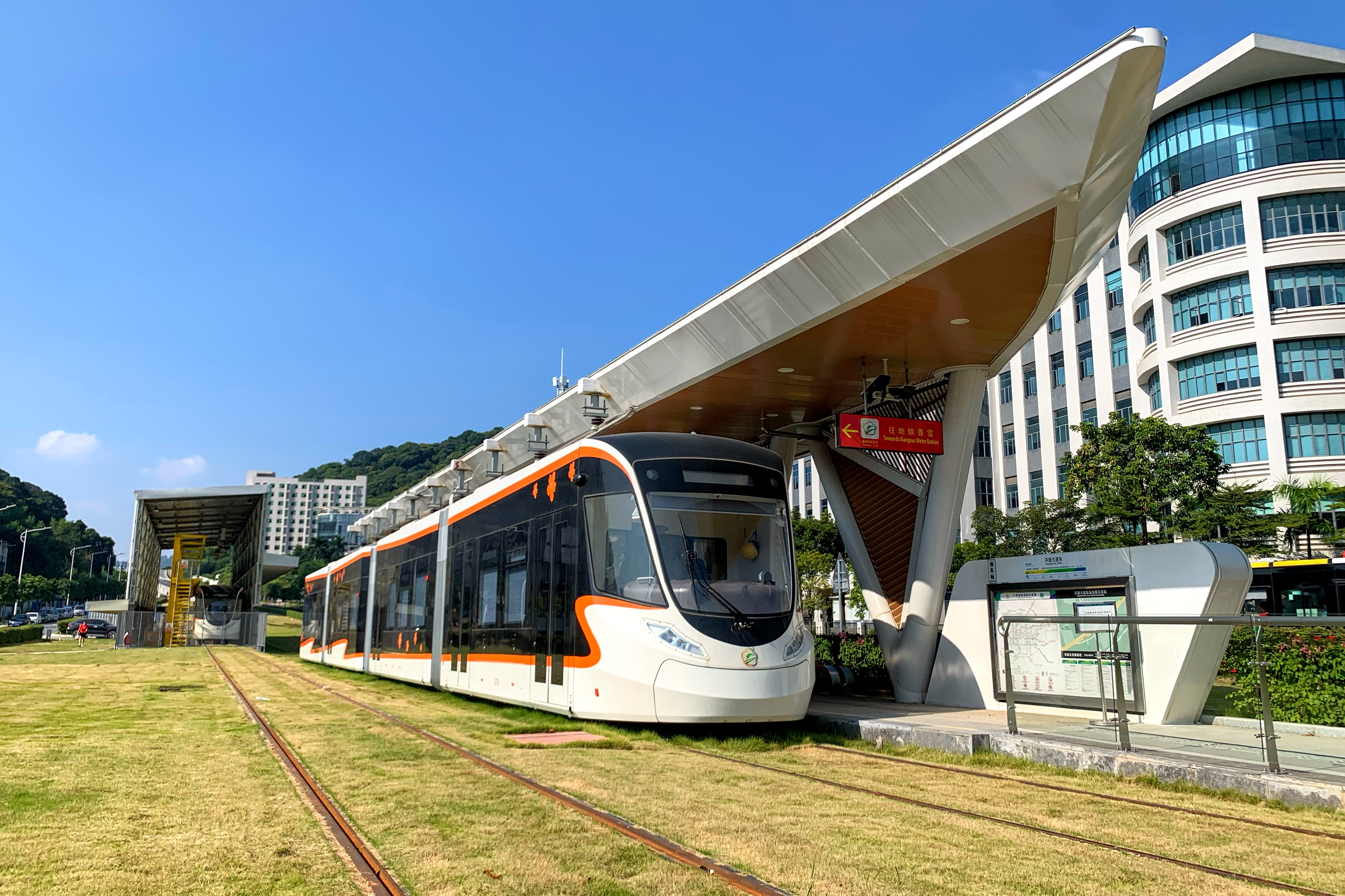
- A tram in Kaiyuan Road East station

Overview
- Native name: 广州黄埔有轨电车2号线
- Owner: Guangzhou Huangpu Light Rail Line 2 Construction & Investment Co., Ltd.
- Locale: Huangpu District, Guangzhou, Guangdong
- Termini: Xiangxue Subway Station; Kaiyuan Road East
- Stations: 8 (in operation); 20 (future)

Service
- Type: Tram
- System: Guangzhou Trams
- Services: 1
- Operator(s): Guangzhou Metro Transit Development Co., Ltd.
- Depot(s): Yuangang Depot; Liucun Depot

History
- Opened: 20 June 2025; 14 months ago

Technical
- Line length: 4.9 km (3.0 mi)
- Number of tracks: 2
- Character: At-grade
- Track gauge: 1,435 mm (4 ft 8 1/2 in)

Guangzhou Huangpu Tram Line 2 (Chinese: 广州黄埔有轨电车2号线) is a tram line serving the Huangpu District of Guangzhou, operated by Guangzhou Trams. On 20 March 2023, the northern section of the Guangzhou Huangpu Tram Line 2 project (Xiangxue Subway Station - Kaiyuan Road East Station) was put into trial operation. On 20 June 2025, the northern section officially opened for passenger service. It is 14.38 km (8.9 mi) in length with 20 stations, of which currently 8 stations spanning 4.9 km (3.0 mi) are operational.

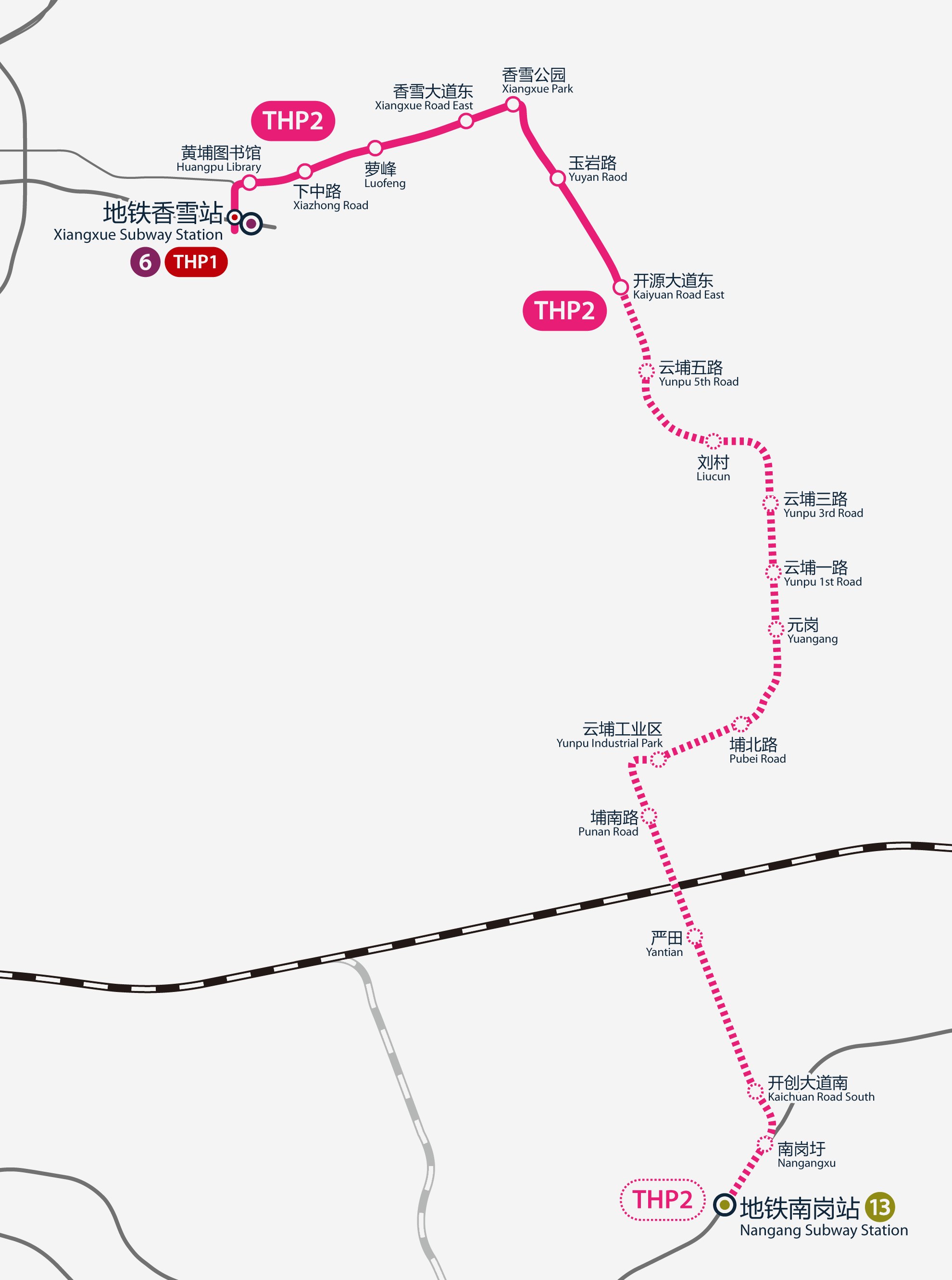
Map of Guangzhou Huangpu Tram Line 2

The northern section of this line (Xiangxue Subway Station – Kaiyuan Road East) completed its pre-operation safety assessment as early as April 2023. However, due to disagreements between the owner and the operator regarding the entrusted operation contract, and the failure to rectify some issues identified in the safety assessment, its opening was delayed until 20 June 2025. The remaining southern section is still under construction and will be developed in conjunction with related municipal facilities.

== Fares ==
The line uses fixed independent fare. Single journey costs 2 RMB regardless of the distance.

== Stations ==
Station No.	Station name		Connections	Distance km	Location
Station No.	English	Chinese	Connections	Distance km	Location
THP201	Xiangxue Subway Station	地铁香雪站	THP1 THP101; 6 632		Huangpu
THP202	Huangpu Library	黄埔图书馆			Huangpu
THP203	Xiazhong Road	下中路			Huangpu
THP204	Luofeng	萝峰			Huangpu
THP205	Xiangxue Road East	香雪大道东			Huangpu
THP206	Xiangxue Park	香雪公园			Huangpu
THP207	Yuyan Road	玉岩路			Huangpu
THP208	Kaiyuan Road East	开源大道东			Huangpu
	Yunpu 5th Road (U/C)	云埔五路			Huangpu
	Liucun (U/C)	刘村			Huangpu
	Yunpu 3rd Road (U/C)	云埔三路			Huangpu
	Yunpu 1st Road (U/C)	云埔一路			Huangpu
	Yuangang (U/C)	元岗			Huangpu
	Pubei Road (U/C)	埔北路			Huangpu
	Yunpu Industrial Zone (U/C)	云埔工业区			Huangpu
	Punan Road (U/C)	埔南路			Huangpu
	Yantian (U/C)	严田			Huangpu
	Kaichuang Road South (U/C)	开创大道南			Huangpu
	Nangangxu (U/C)	南岗圩			Huangpu
	Nangang Subway Station	地铁南岗	13 1329		Huangpu

== History ==
=== Planning ===
In December 2017, the feasibility study for the line was approved, and preliminary design preparations were subsequently carried out. On 1 July 2019, the environmental impact assessment for the route was released for public comment.

=== Construction ===
The groundbreaking ceremony for this line was held on 28 September 2019, and construction officially commenced on 25 December the same year. Construction on the Xiangxue Road section (from Xiangxue Subway Station to Xiangxue Park Station) officially began in April 2020, with track laying commencing in early October the same year. Main construction was completed in late October 2020.

In March 2021, construction officially began on the Yuyan Road section. On 1 July the same year, the tracks for the Xiangxue Road section and the Yuyan Road section (from Xiangxue Subway Station to Yunfeng Road Station) were successfully connected.

On 16 April 2022, the first continuous section of the Huangpu Tram viaduct across the Guangzhou-Shenzhen Expressway was successfully poured.

As of 2026, the main structures of key control points of the southern section of Line 2, such as the elevated bridge across the Guangzhou-Shenzhen Expressway and the newly built bridge across the Nangang River, have been completed. However, construction on some other points is still unable to commence due to the progress of planned municipal engineering projects, with notable sections including the Yuyun Road section at Yunpu 5th Road, the track connection between Punan Road and Kaichuang Road Bridge and the Hongming Road Overpass between Yantian and Kaichuang Road South. Construction on the Nangang section (between Nangang River and Nangang Subway Station) will also have to wait until the old village renovation project in Nangang Community starts.

=== Operation ===
On 28 December 2020, the day Line 1 opened to the public, in conjunction with the opening of the 13th Luogang Xiangxue Cultural Tourism Festival, the Jiaotong Investment Group announced that the section of Line 2 from Huangpu Library to Xiangxue Park would be open for trial rides from the following day until 3 January 2021, to facilitate tourists' visits to Xiangxue Park to appreciate plum blossoms.

In early March 2023, the northern section completed its initial safety pre-operation assessment. It began trial operation without passengers on the 20th the same month. On 13 April, the Guangzhou Municipal Development and Reform Commission approved the fare scheme for Line 2. On 25 April 2023, the northern section passed the pre-opening safety assessment.

The northern section began initial operation on 20 June 2025.

== See also ==
- Guangzhou Tram
