= Luogang station =

Guangzhou Metro Line 6 and Line 7 station

Luogang 萝岗
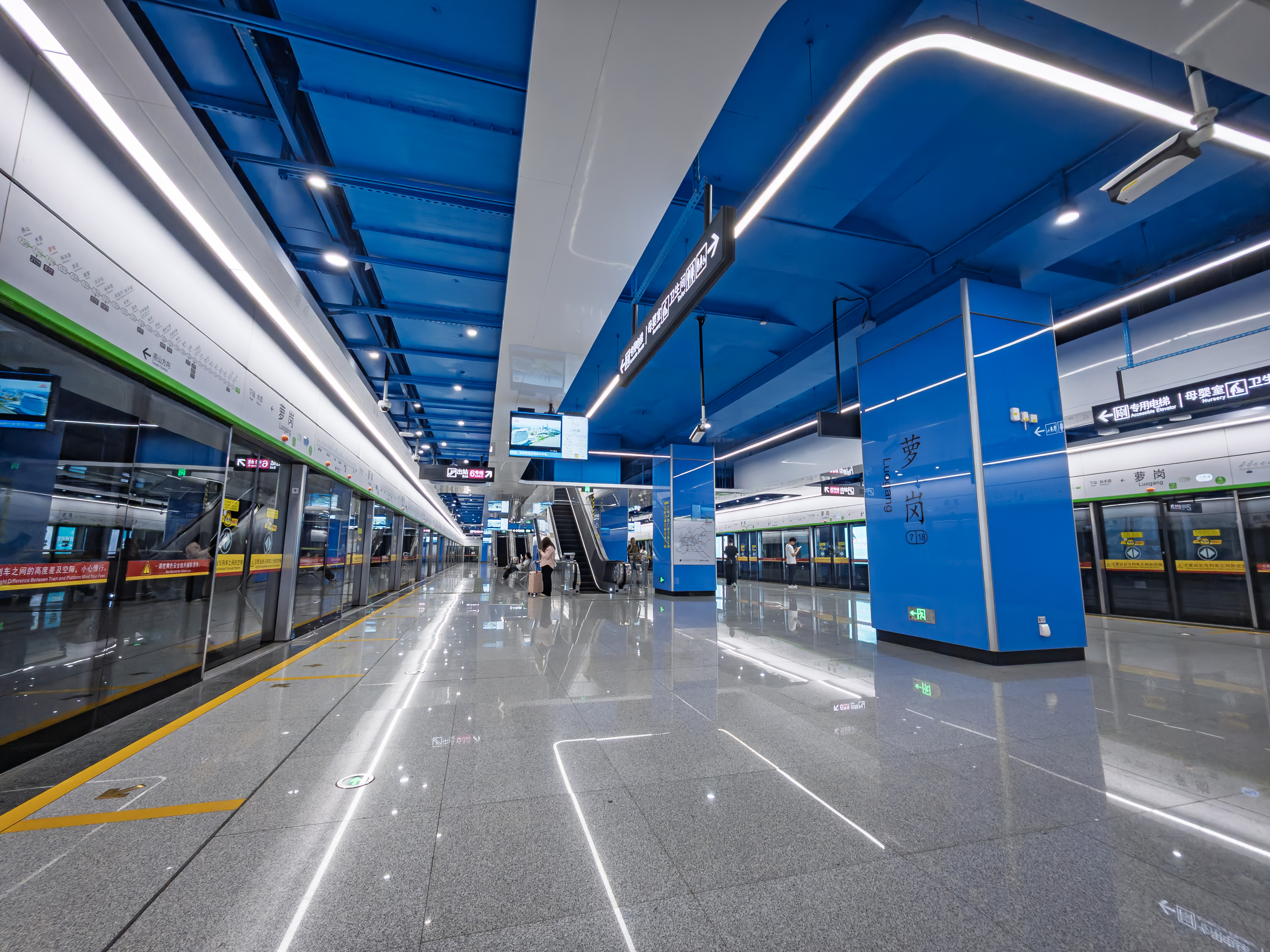
- Line 7 platform

Chinese name
- Simplified Chinese: 萝岗站
- Traditional Chinese: 蘿崗站
Transcriptions
Standard Mandarin
- Hanyu Pinyin: Luógǎng Zhàn
Yue: Cantonese
- Yale Romanization: Lògōng Jaahm
- Jyutping: Lo^{4}gong^{1} Zaam^{6}

General information
- Location: Kaichuang Avenue (开创大道) and Xiangxue No. 3 Road (香雪三路) / Kaida Road (开达路); Huangpu District, Guangzhou, Guangdong; China
- Coordinates: 23°10′42.08″N 113°28′32.06″E
- Operator: Guangzhou Metro Co. Ltd.
- Lines: Line 6; Line 7
- Platforms: 4 (2 island platforms)
- Tracks: 4
- Connections: THP1 (Civic Square)

Construction
- Structure type: Underground
- Accessible: Yes

Other information
- Station code: 631 718

History
- Opened: Line 6: 28 December 2016 (9 years ago); Line 7: 28 December 2023 (2 years ago)

Services
Preceding station	Guangzhou Metro	Following station
Suyuan towards Xunfenggang	Line 6	Xiangxue Terminus
Kefeng Lu towards Meidi Dadao	Line 7	Shuixi towards Yanshan
Transfer at Civic Square
Convention Center towards Xinfeng Lu	Huangpu Tram Line 1 transfer at Civic Square	Xiankeng towards Xiangxue
Location

Luogang station (simplified Chinese: 萝岗站; traditional Chinese: 蘿崗站; pinyin: Luógǎng Zhàn; Cantonese Yale: Lògōng Jaahm) is an interchange station between Line 6 and Line 7 of the Guangzhou Metro. Line 6 opened on 28 December 2016, whilst Line 7 opened on 28 December 2023.

== Station layout ==
=== Line 6 ===
G	-	Exits A, C, D
L1; Concourse	Lobby	Ticket Machines, Customer Service, Shops, Police Station, Security Facilities; Transfer passageway to Line 7
L2; Platforms	Platform 2	6 towards Xunfenggang (Suyuan)
L2; Platforms	Island platform, doors will open on the left (Toilets)
L2; Platforms	Platform 1	6 towards Xiangxue (terminus)

=== Line 7 ===
G	-	Exits B, E, F
L1; Concourse	Lobby	Ticket Machines, Customer Service, Shops, Police Station, Security Facilities
L1; Concourse	Transfer Node	Transfer passageway to Line 6
L2; Equipment Area	-	Station Equipment
L3; Platforms	Platform 4	7 towards Meidi Dadao (Kefeng Lu)
L3; Platforms	Island platform, doors will open on the left (Toilets, Nursery)
L3; Platforms	Platform 3	7 towards Yanshan (Shuixi)

=== Entrances/exits ===
The station has 6 points of entry/exit, of which Exits A, C and D are located at the Line 6 concourse, whilst Exits E, F and G are located at the Line 7 concourse. Exits C and E are equipped with elevators.

At the time of the station's opening, Exit C was originally located on the west side of Xiangxue 3rd Road, but it was demolished on 28 July 2021 to accommodate the second phase of Line 7, and a new Exit C was relocated to near Huixing Road. A new Exit G was set up by Line 7 near the original location.

==== Line 6 concourse ====
- A: Kaichuang Avenue
- C: Xiangxue 3rd Road
- D: Huixing Road

==== Line 7 concourse ====
- E: Xiangxue 3rd Road, Guangzhou Intellectual Property Court
- F: Xiangxue 3rd Road, THP1 Civic Square Station
- G: Xiangxue 3rd Road
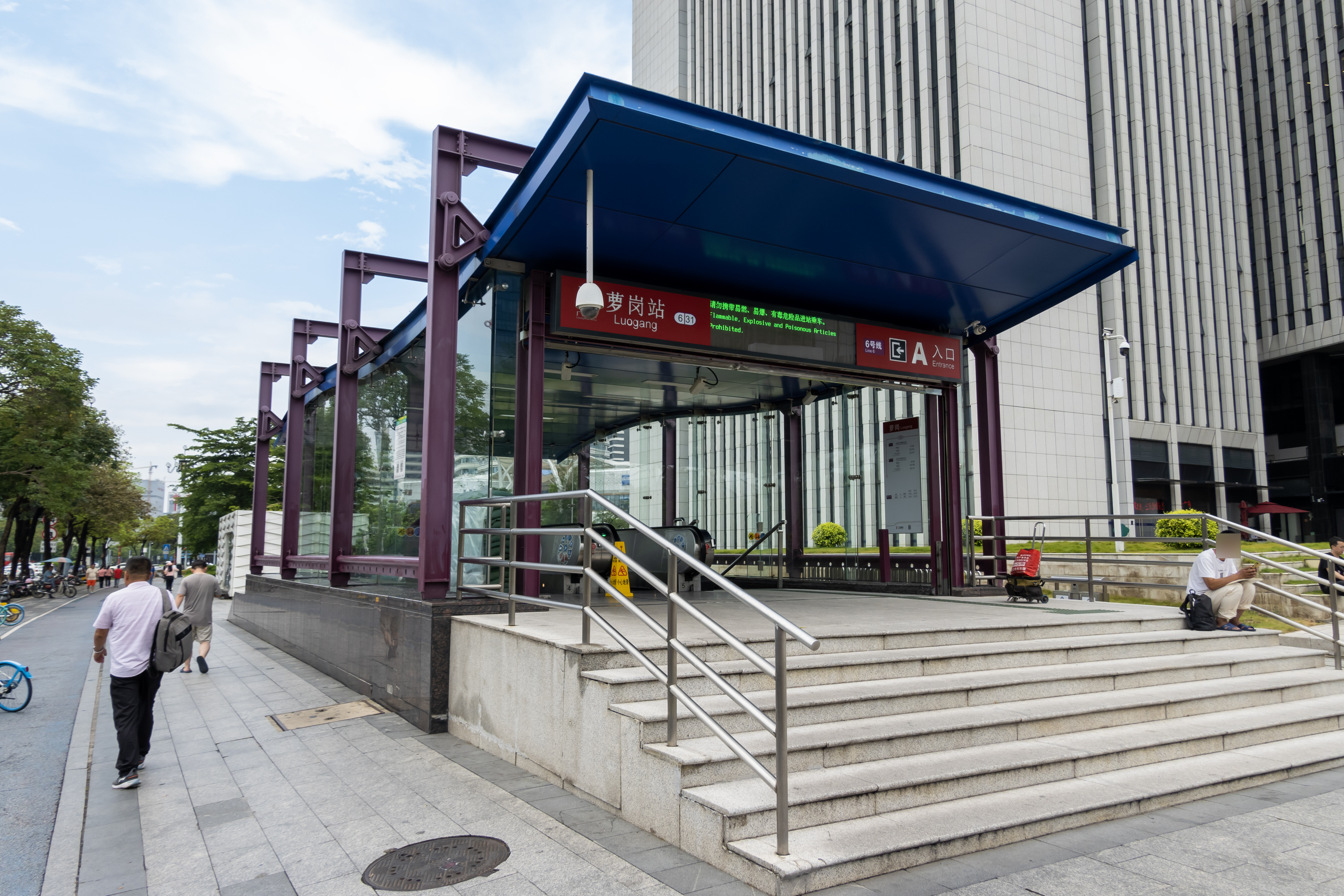
Entrance A

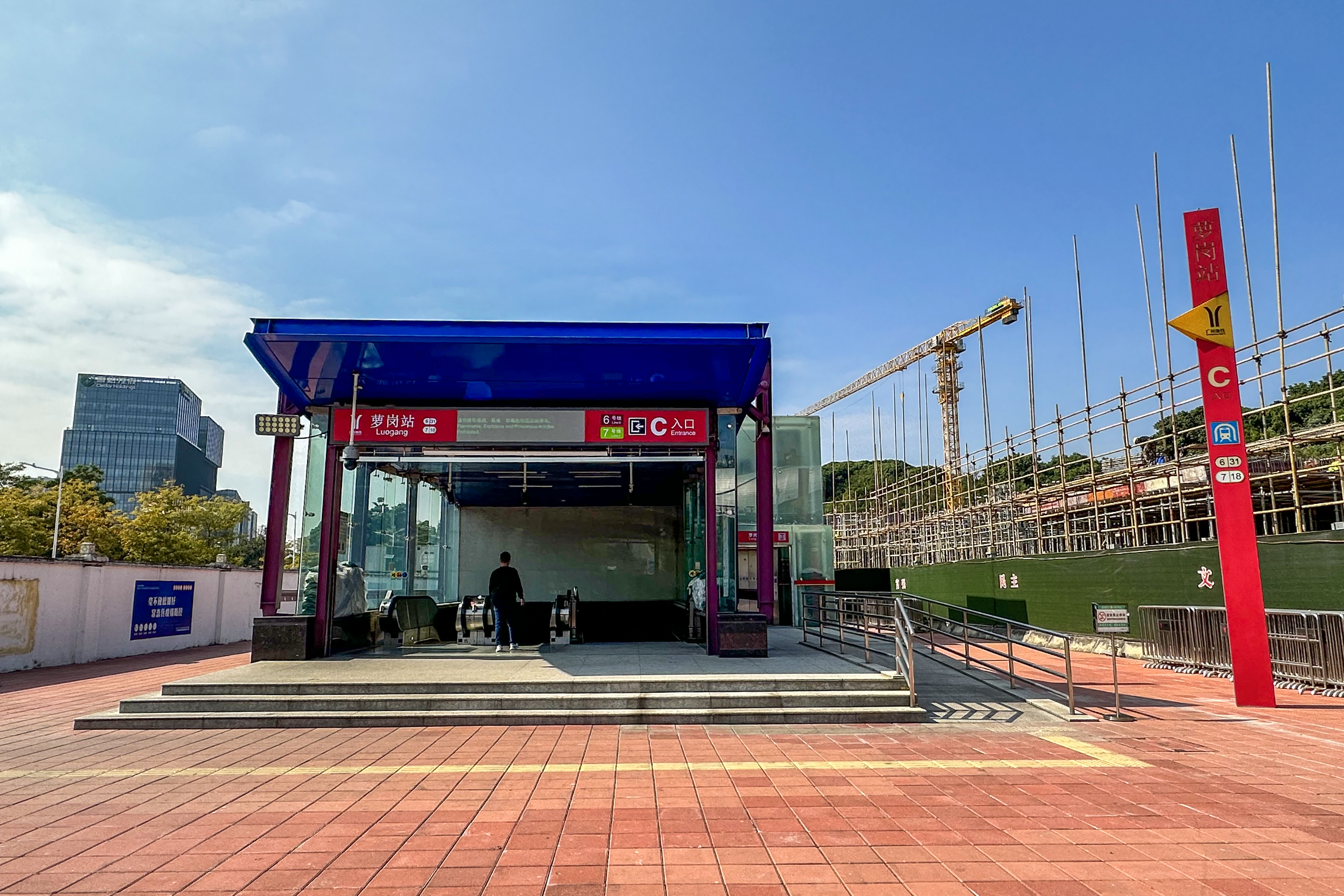
Entrance C

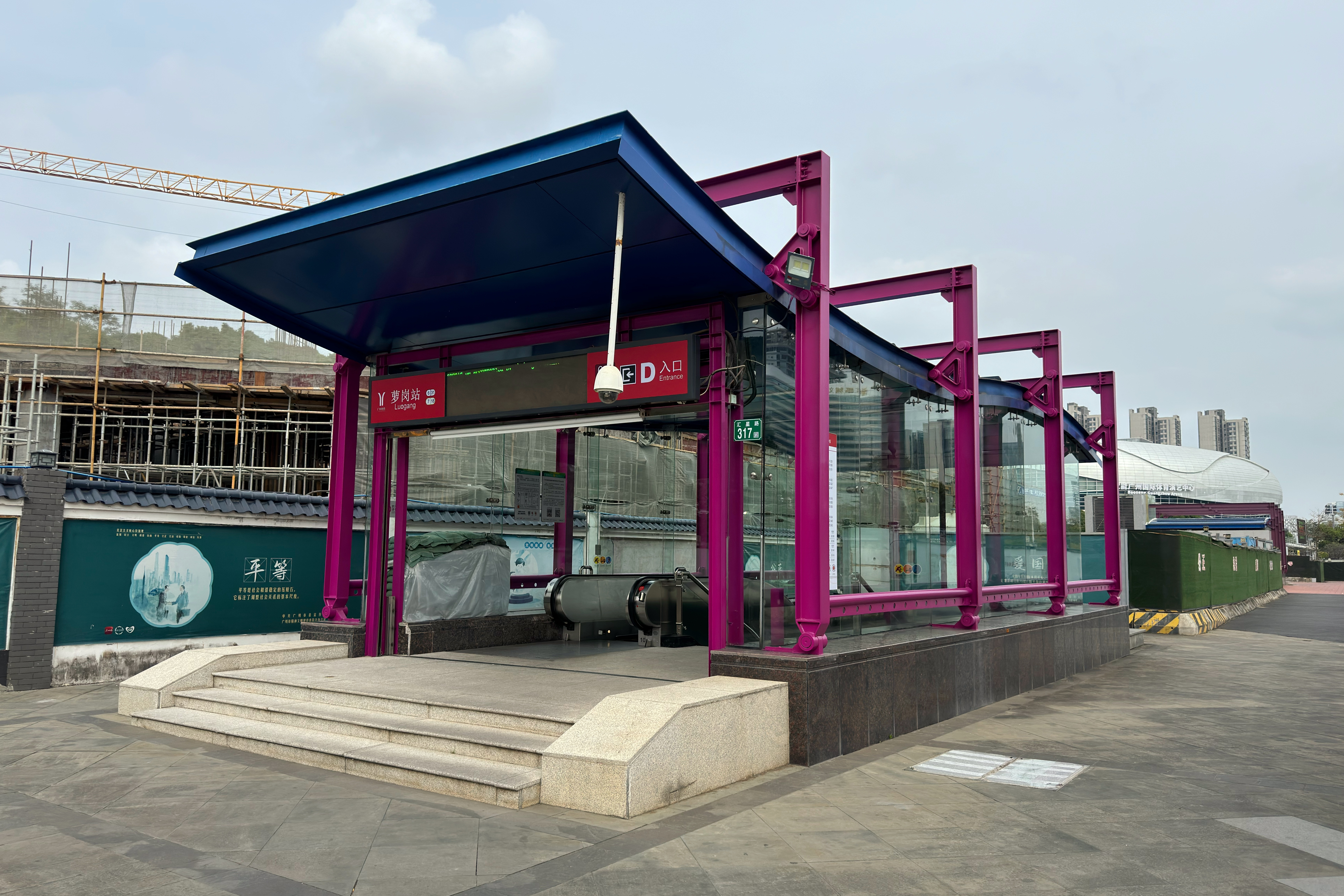
Entrance D

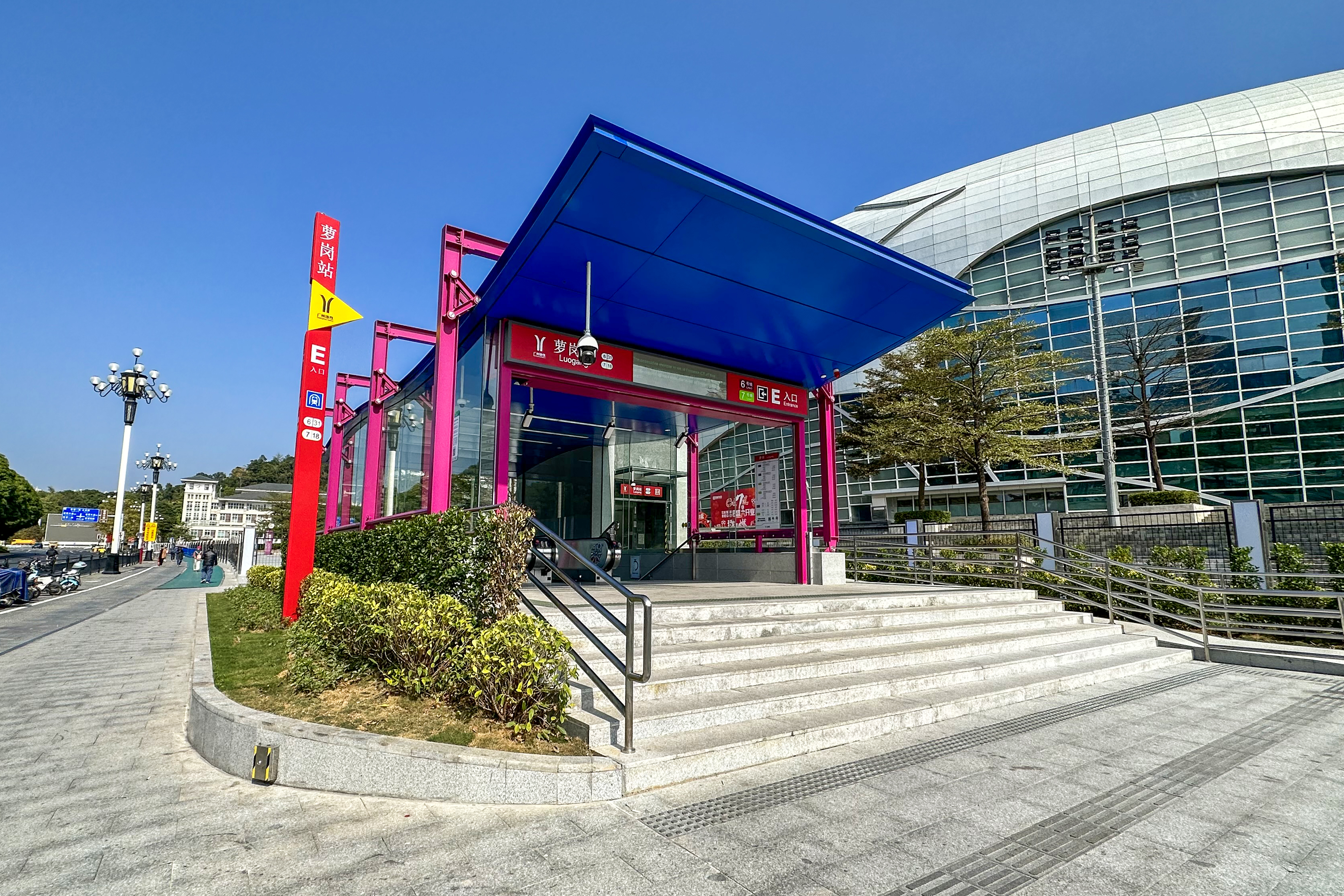
Entrance E

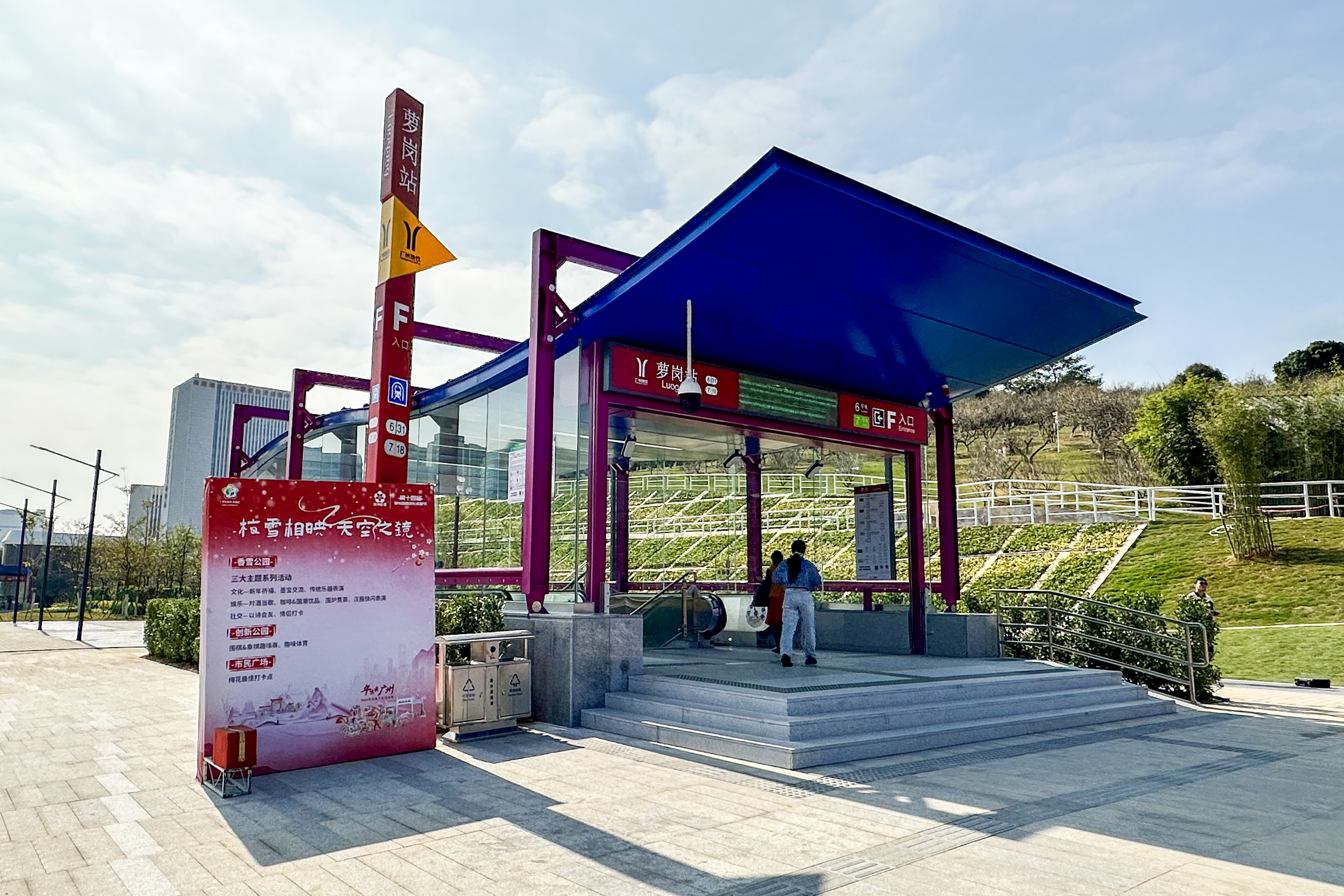
Entrance F

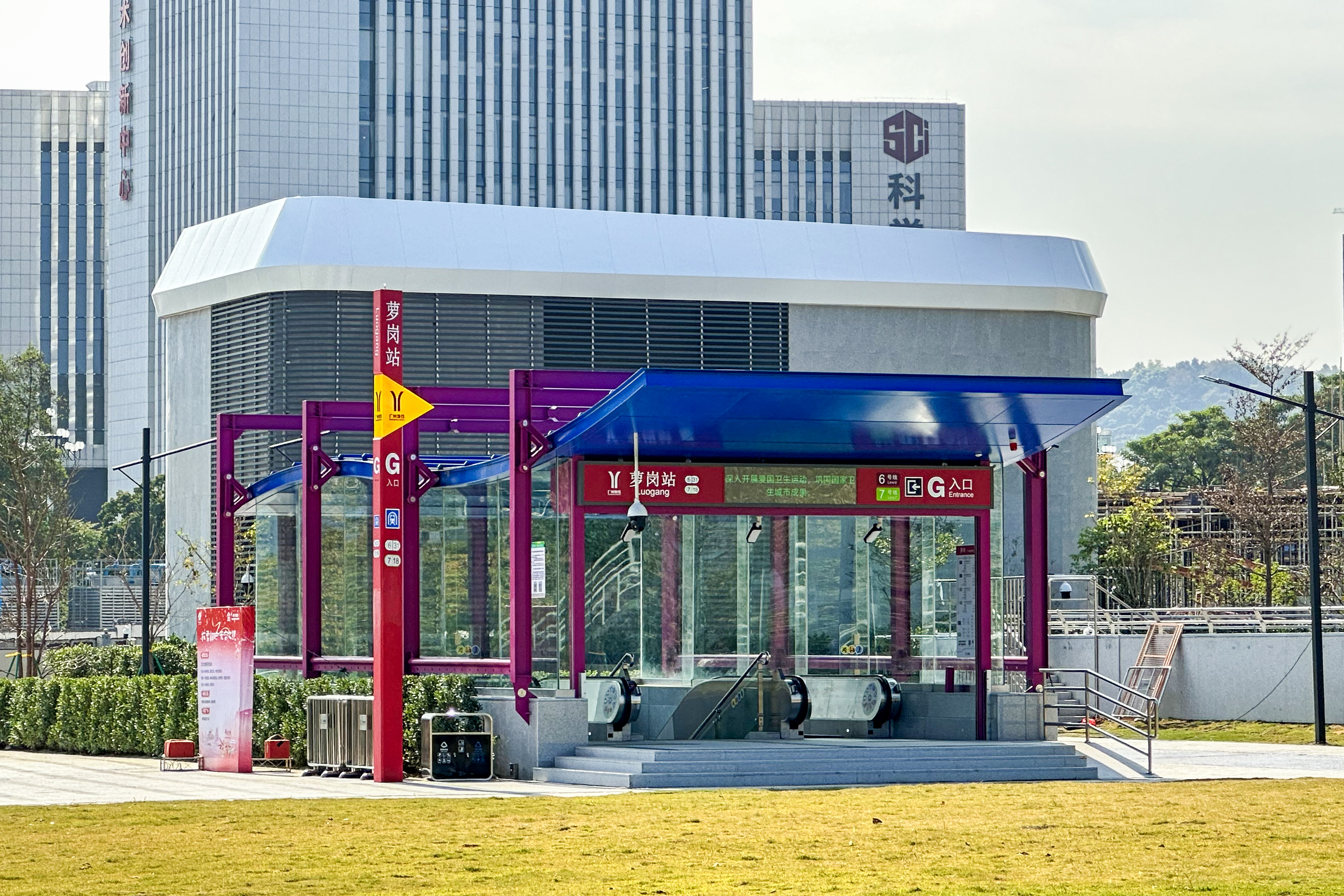
Entrance G

== Gallery ==
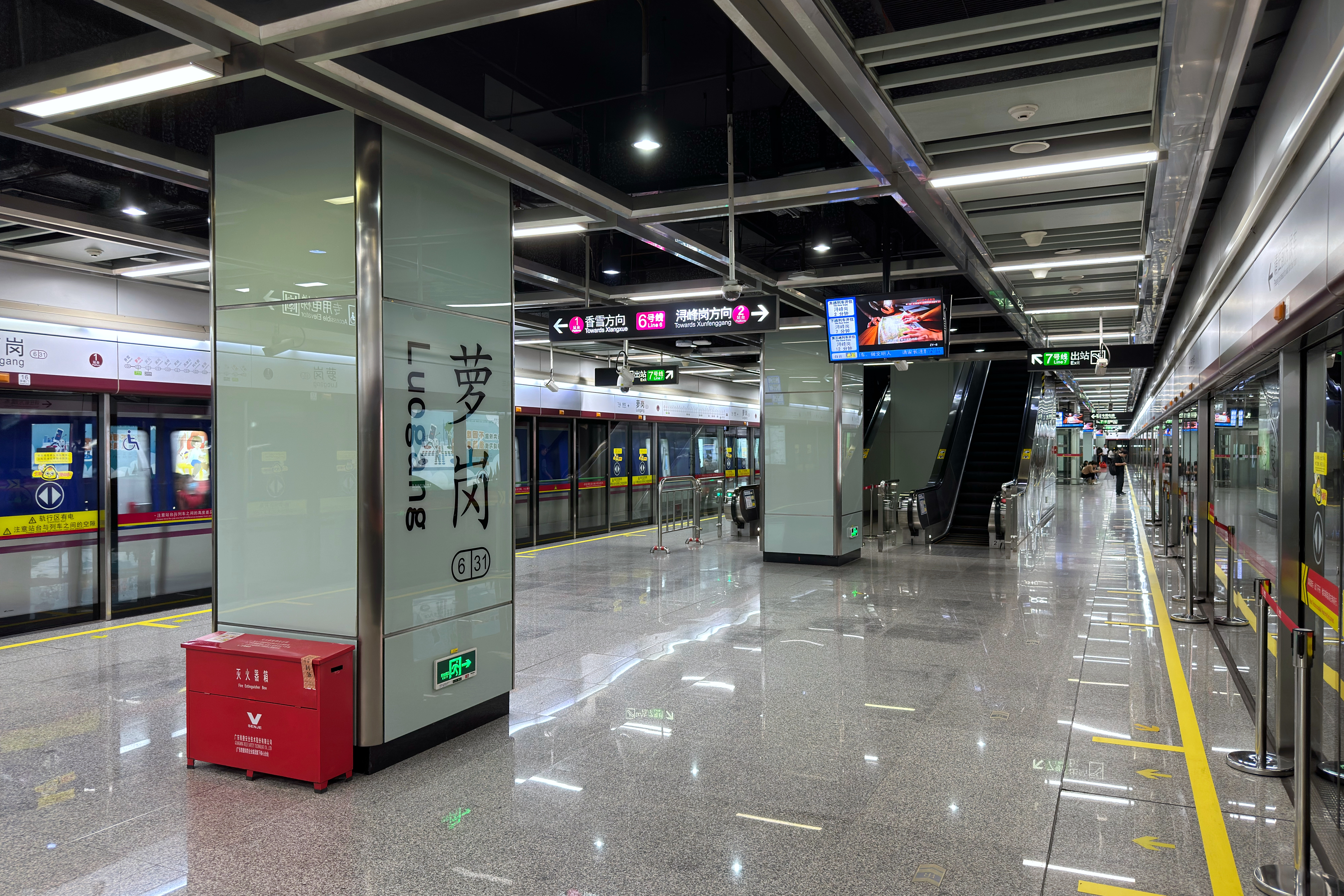
Line 6 platform

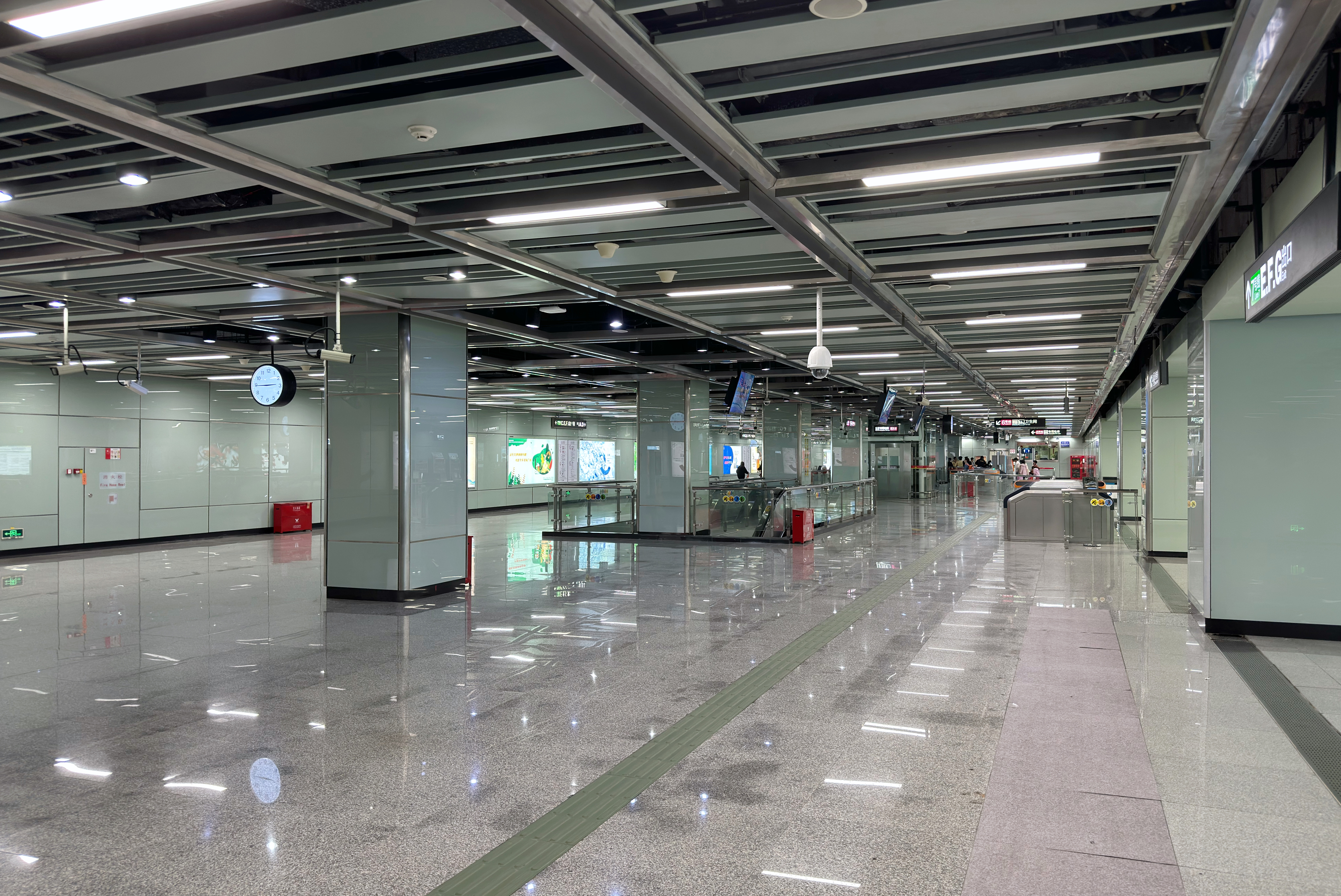
Line 6 concourse

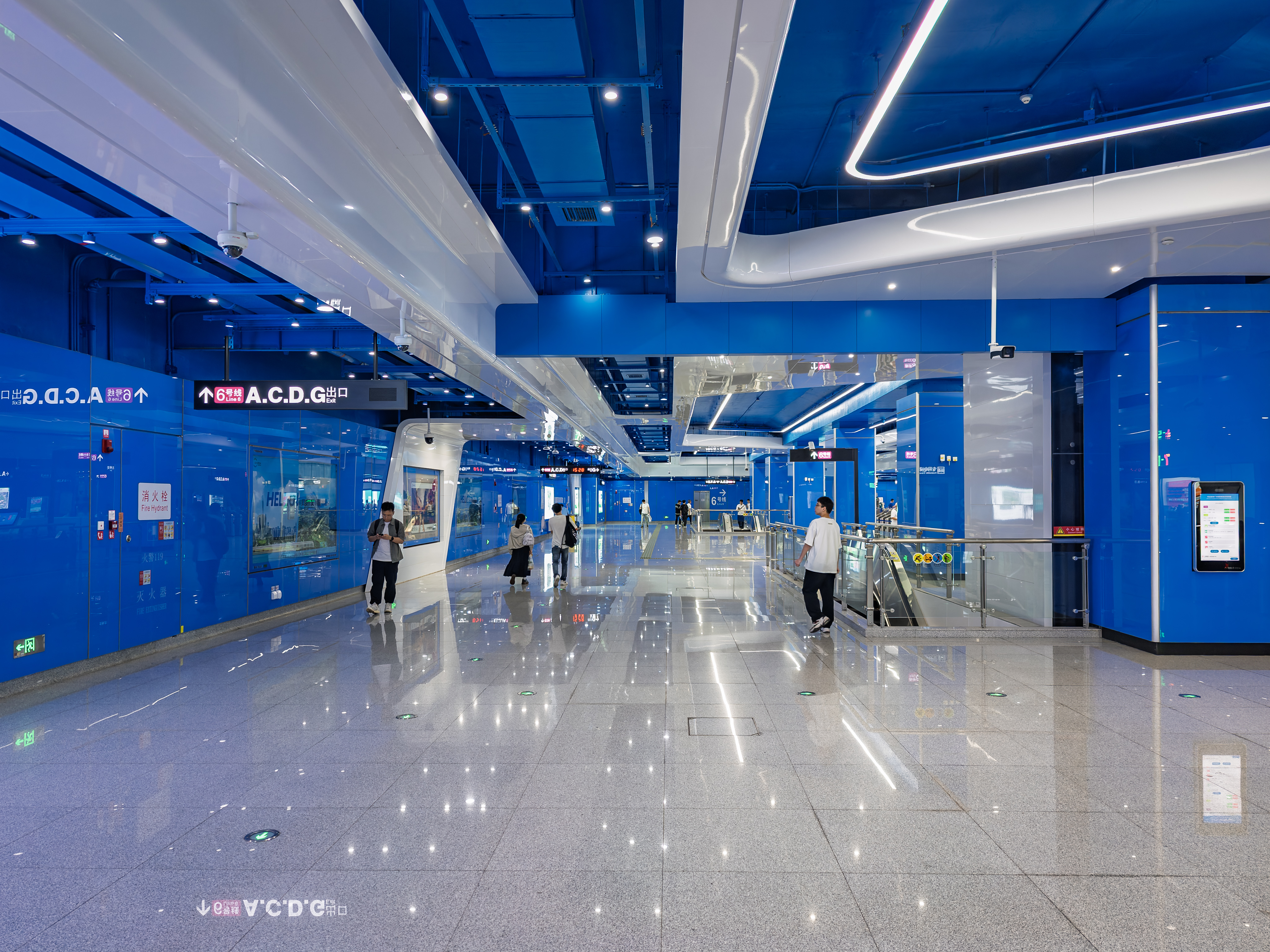
Line 7 concourse

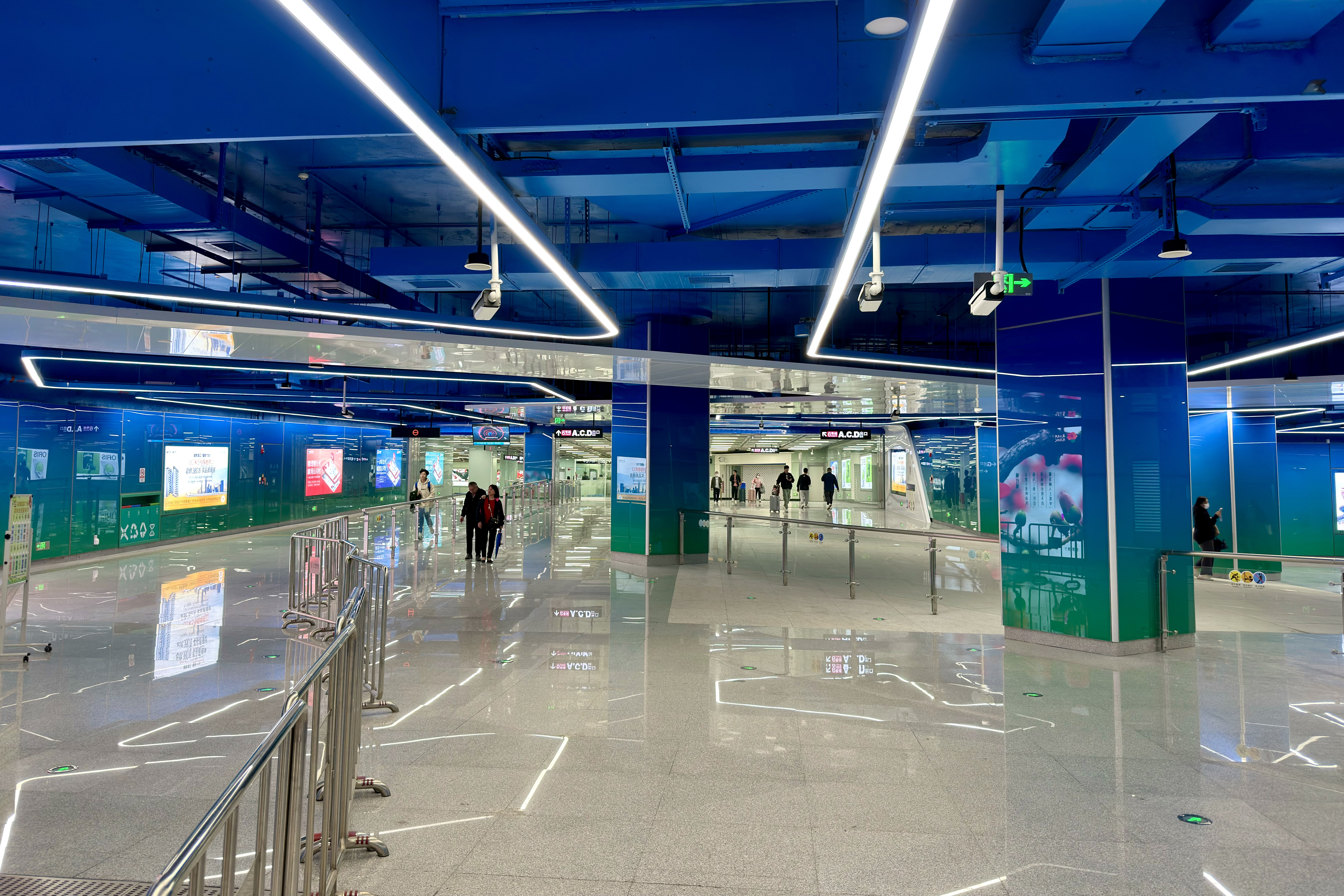
Transfer passageway

== History ==
=== Line 6 ===
This station first appeared in the 2003 subway plan and was one of the intermediate stations of Line 4 on Kaichuang Avenue. In 2006, Luogang District chose Line 6, which directly leads to downtown Guangzhou, to connect the central area of Luogang, and planned the second phase of Line 6 to extend significantly eastward from Gaotangshi to replace the Kaichuang Avenue section of Line 4. On 18 October 2009, the station took the lead in starting construction as the second phase of the experimental site of Line 6 and topped out before the 2010 Guangzhou Asian Games. In September 2011, the Guangzhou Civil Affairs Bureau announced the initial station name of the Luogang section of Line 6, and the name of this station remained unchanged.

On 28 December 2016, the station opened with the opening of the second phase of Line 6.

=== Line 7 ===
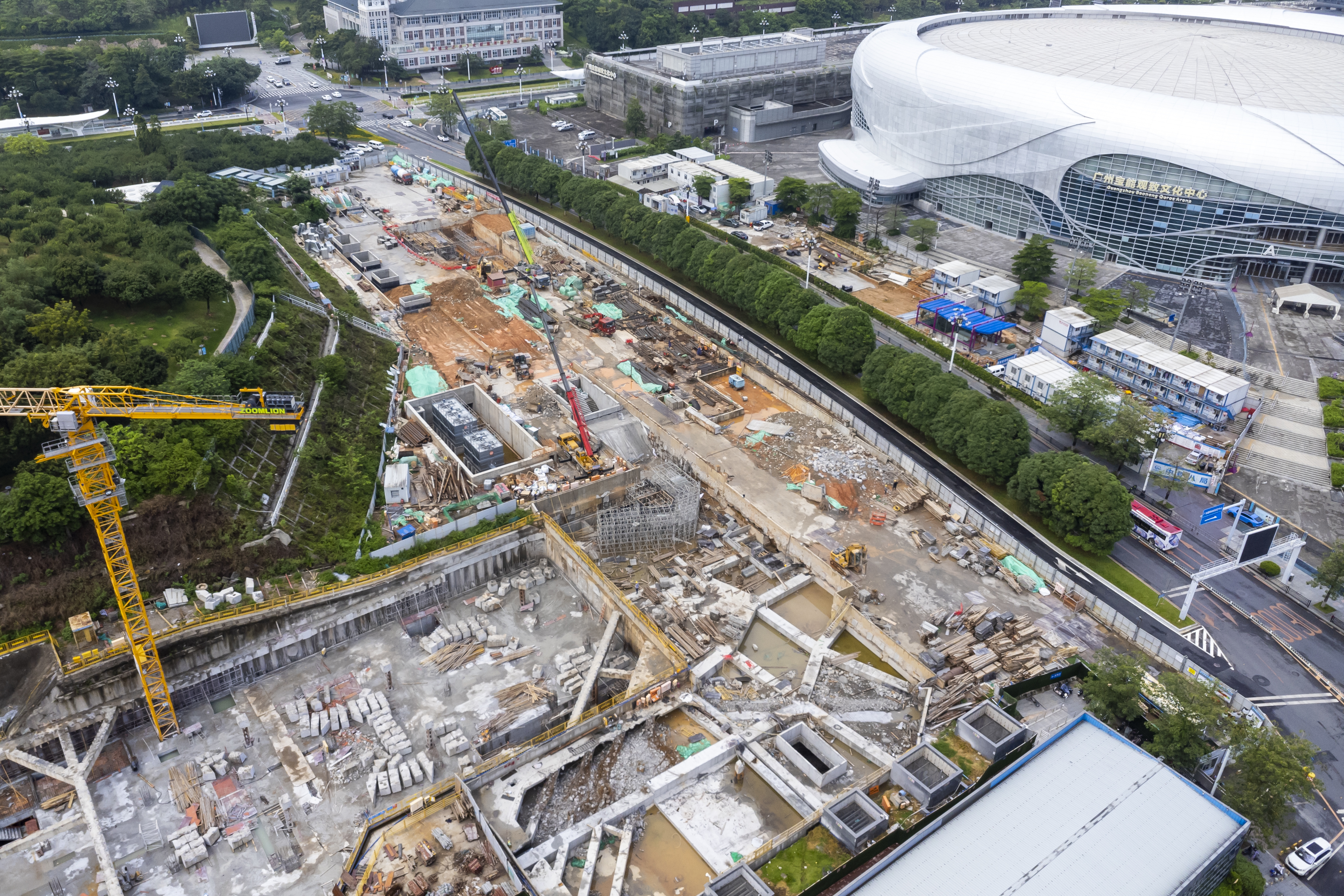
Line 7 construction site (June 2023)

In response to the merger of the former Huangpu District and Luogang District into the new Huangpu District in 2015, the line plan of the Huangpu section for Line 7 was also significantly extended from Dashadong to the north, and the line was originally planned to terminate at this station and intersect with Line 6. This was the case until 2016, when the northward extension to Shuixi and the finalized Shuibei Station (now Yanshan) was implemented, which meant the station was also planned to be changed to an intermediate station. This corresponding section was now added to the second phase of Line 7 and was subsequently implemented.

In order to cooperate with the construction of the transfer channel, the original Exit C of Line 6 was closed and demolished on 28 July 2021, and the entrance/exit was rebuilt near Huixing Road. Some areas of the Line 6 concourse have also been enclosed on 28 November 2023 to accommodate the access of the Line 7 station.

In August 2022, the main structure of the Line 7 station was topped out. The station completed the "three rights" transfer on 31 October 2023.

On the morning of 28 December 2023, Guangzhou Metro held an opening event at this station. At 12:00 on the same day, the Line 7 station section officially opened with the opening of the second phase of Line 7, and the station became a transfer station.

== Future development ==
=== Line 17 and Line 37 ===
According to the "Guangzhou Urban Rail Transit Network Planning Plan" (2018-2035) approved by the Guangzhou Municipal Government in November 2020, two high-speed metro Lines 17 and 37 will set up a station here in the future. However, the relevant plan has not yet been implemented and there is still a possibility of change.
