= Xiangxue station =

Guangzhou Metro station

Coordinates: 23.172382°N 113.501224°E

Xiangxue 香雪
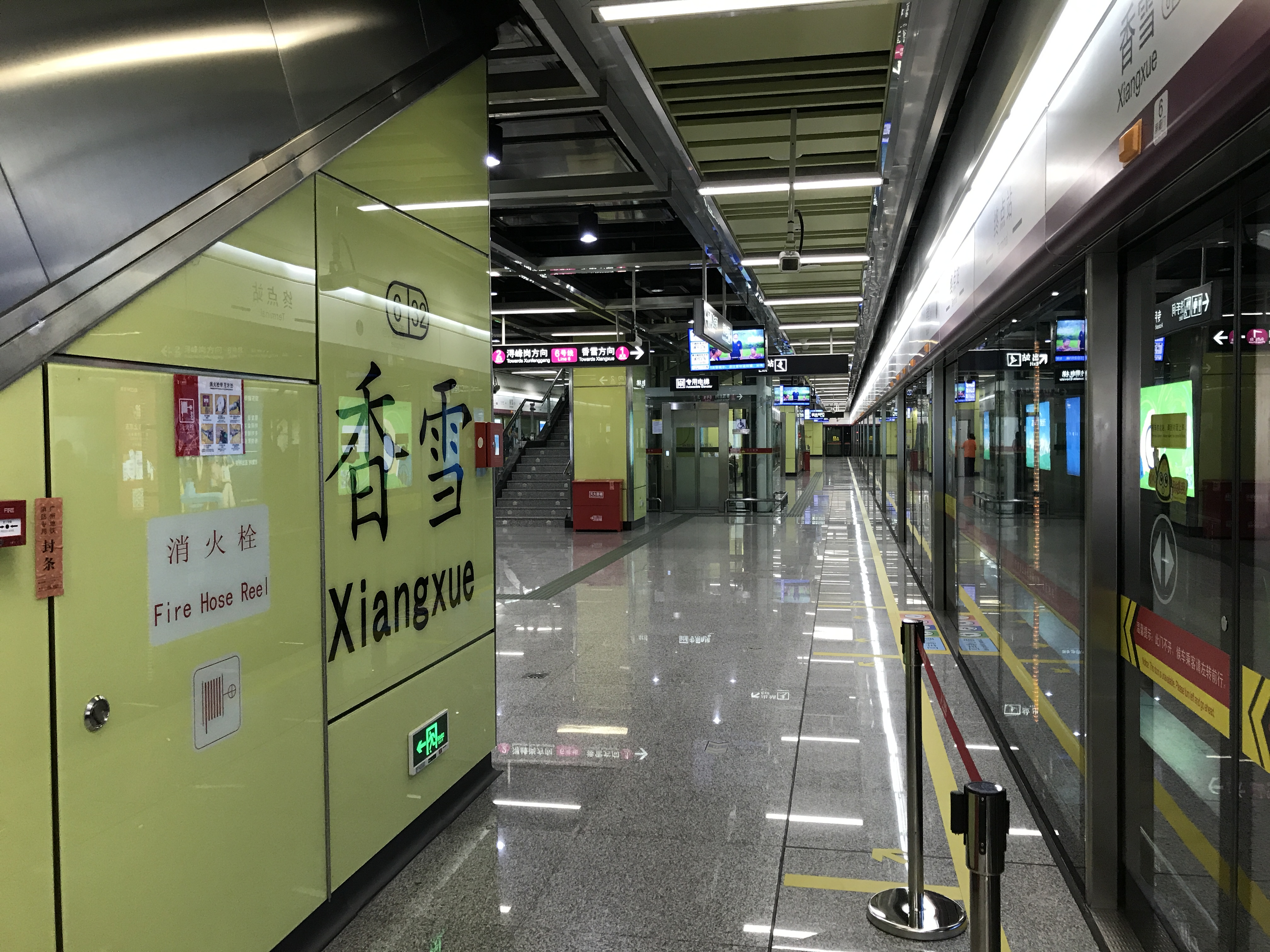

General information
- Location: Kaichuang Avenue (开创大道) and Lihong No. 2 Road (荔红二路); Huangpu District, Guangzhou, Guangdong; China
- Operated by: Guangzhou Metro Co. Ltd.
- Lines: Line 6 Huangpu Tram Line 1 Huangpu Tram Line 2

Other information
- Station code: 632; THP101; THP201

History
- Opened: 28 December 2016; 9 years ago

Services
| Preceding station | Guangzhou Metro | Following station |
|---|---|---|
| Luogang towards Xunfenggang | Line 6 | Terminus |
| Luogang District Children's Palace towards Xinfeng Lu | Huangpu Tram Line 1 | Terminus |
| Terminus | Huangpu Tram Line 2 | Huangpu Library towards Kaiyuan Road East |
Location

Xiangxue station (Chinese: 香雪站; pinyin: Xiāngxuě Zhàn; Jyutping: hoeng^{1}syut^{3} zaam^{6}), is a station and the current eastern terminus of Line 6 of the Guangzhou Metro. It started operations on 28 December 2016.

== Station layout ==
Line 6

| G | - | Exits |
| L1; Concourse | Lobby | Customer Service, Shops, Vending machines, ATMs, Paid transfer to THP1 THP2 (U/C) |
| L2; Platforms | Platform 2 | 6 towards Xunfenggang (Luogang) |
| L2; Platforms | Island platform, doors will open on the left |
| L2; Platforms | Platform 1 | 6 termination platform |

Huangpu Tram

| G Platforms | Track (West) | THP1 towards Xinfeng Lu (Luogang District Children's Palace) |
| G Platforms | Island platform, doors will open on the left |
| G Platforms | Track (East) | THP2 towards Kaiyuan Road East (Huangpu Library) |
| B | Connections | Paid transfer to 6 (U/C) |

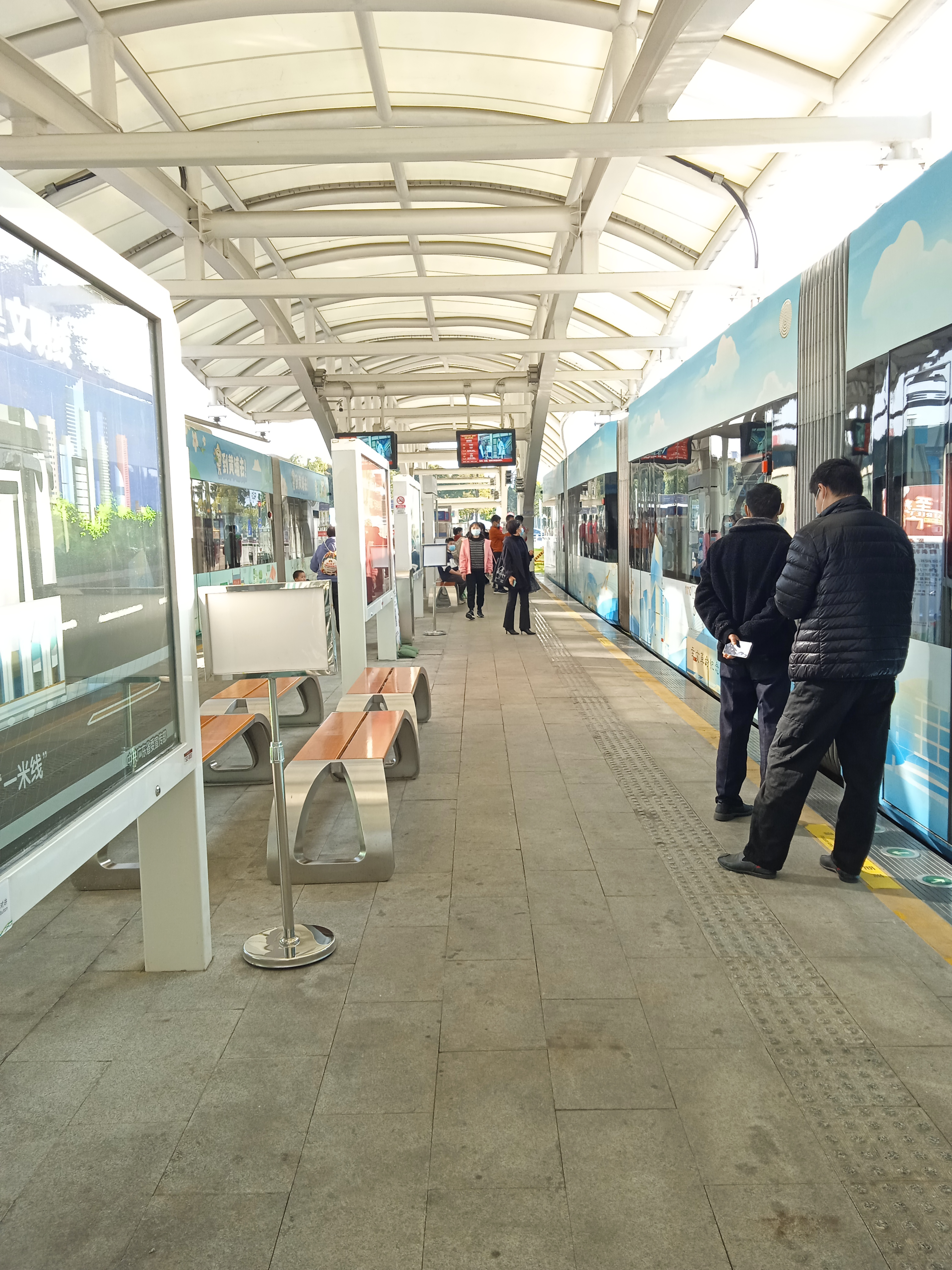
Huangpu Tram platform

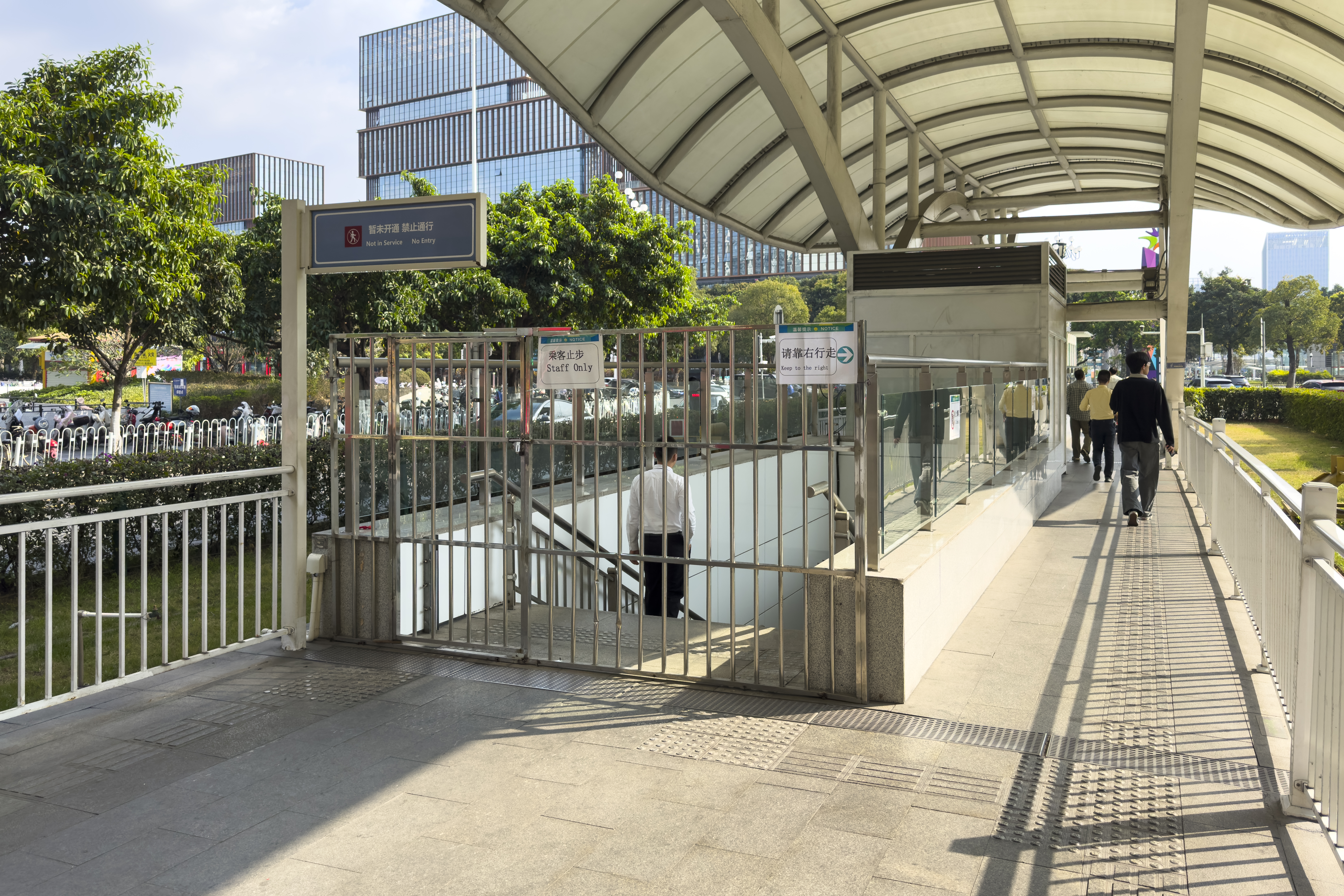
Unopened transfer to Line 6

== Exits ==
| Exit number | | Exit location |
|---|---|---|
| Exit B | B1 | Kaichuang Dadao |
| Exit E | | Lihong Erlu |
| Exit F | | Kailuo Dadao; THP1 THP2 |
