= Tianpingjia station =

Guangzhou Metro station

Tianpingjia 天平架
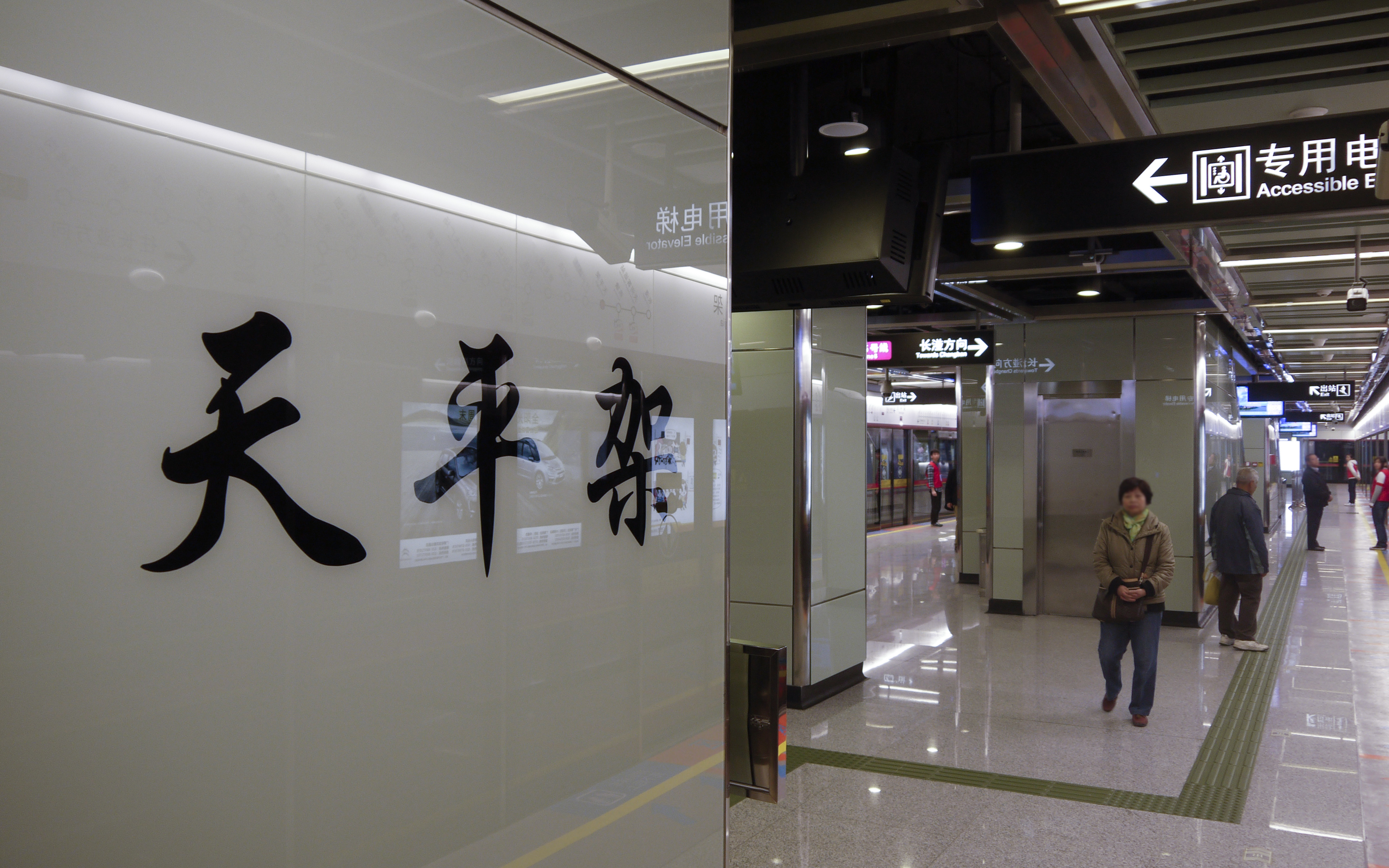
- Platform

Chinese name
- Chinese: 天平架站
Transcriptions
Standard Mandarin
- Hanyu Pinyin: Tiānpíngjià Zhàn
Yue: Cantonese
- Jyutping: Tin^{3}ping^{4}gaa^{3} Zaam^{6}

General information
- Location: Shatai Road (沙太路) and Xinghua Road (兴华路); Tianhe District, Guangzhou, Guangdong; China
- Coordinates: 23°09′35″N 113°19′16″E
- Operated by: Guangzhou Metro Co. Ltd.
- Line: Line 6
- Platforms: 2 (1 island platform)
- Tracks: 2

Construction
- Structure type: Underground
- Accessible: Yes

Other information
- Station code: 619

History
- Opened: 28 December 2013; 12 years ago

Services
| Preceding station | Guangzhou Metro | Following station |
|---|---|---|
| Shahe towards Xunfenggang | Line 6 | Yantang towards Xiangxue |
Location

Tianpingjia Station (Chinese: 天平架站; pinyin: Tiānpíngjià Zhàn; Jyutping: tin^{1}ping^{4}gaa^{3} zaam^{6}) is a station on Line 6 of the Guangzhou Metro. It is located underground in the Tianhe District of Guangzhou and started operation on 28 December 2013.

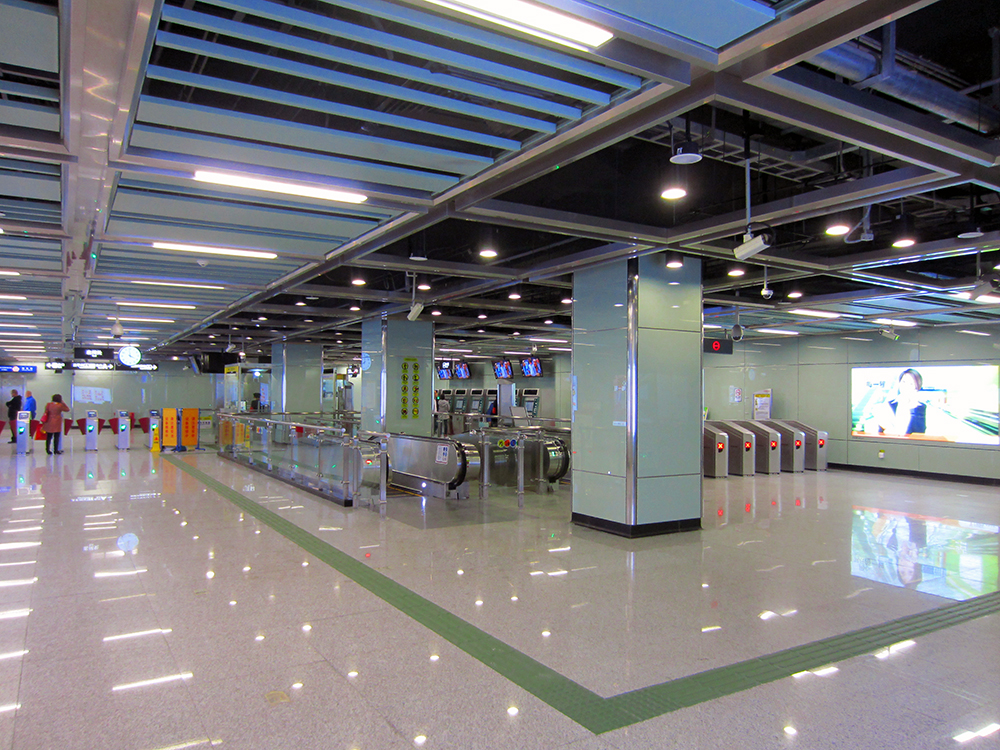
Concourse

== Station layout ==
| G | - | Exits A & B |
| L1; Concourse | Lobby | Ticket Machines, Customer Service, Shops, Police Station, Safety Facilities, Restroom |
| L2; Equipment Area | - | Station equipment |
| L3; Platforms | Platform 2 | 6 towards Xunfenggang (Shahe) |
| L3; Platforms | Island platform, doors will open on the left |
| L3; Platforms | Platform 1 | 6 towards Xiangxue (Yantang) |

=== Entrances/exits ===
The station has 2 points of entry/exit, located on both sides of Xinghua Road. Exit A is accessible via stairlift.

- A: Xinghua Road, Tianpingjia Bus Terminus
- B: Xinghua Road, Guangzhou No. 75 Middle School
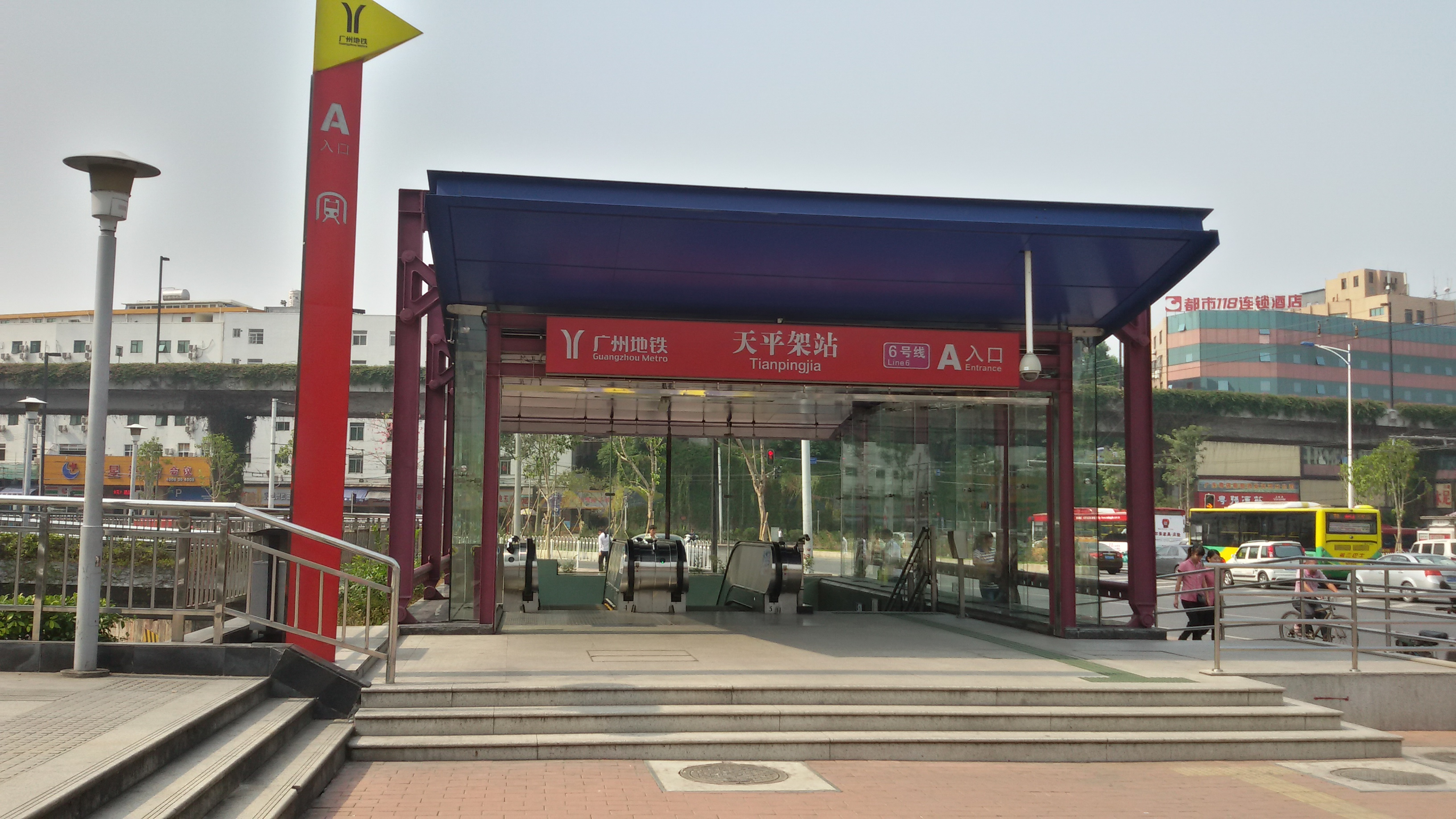
Entrance A

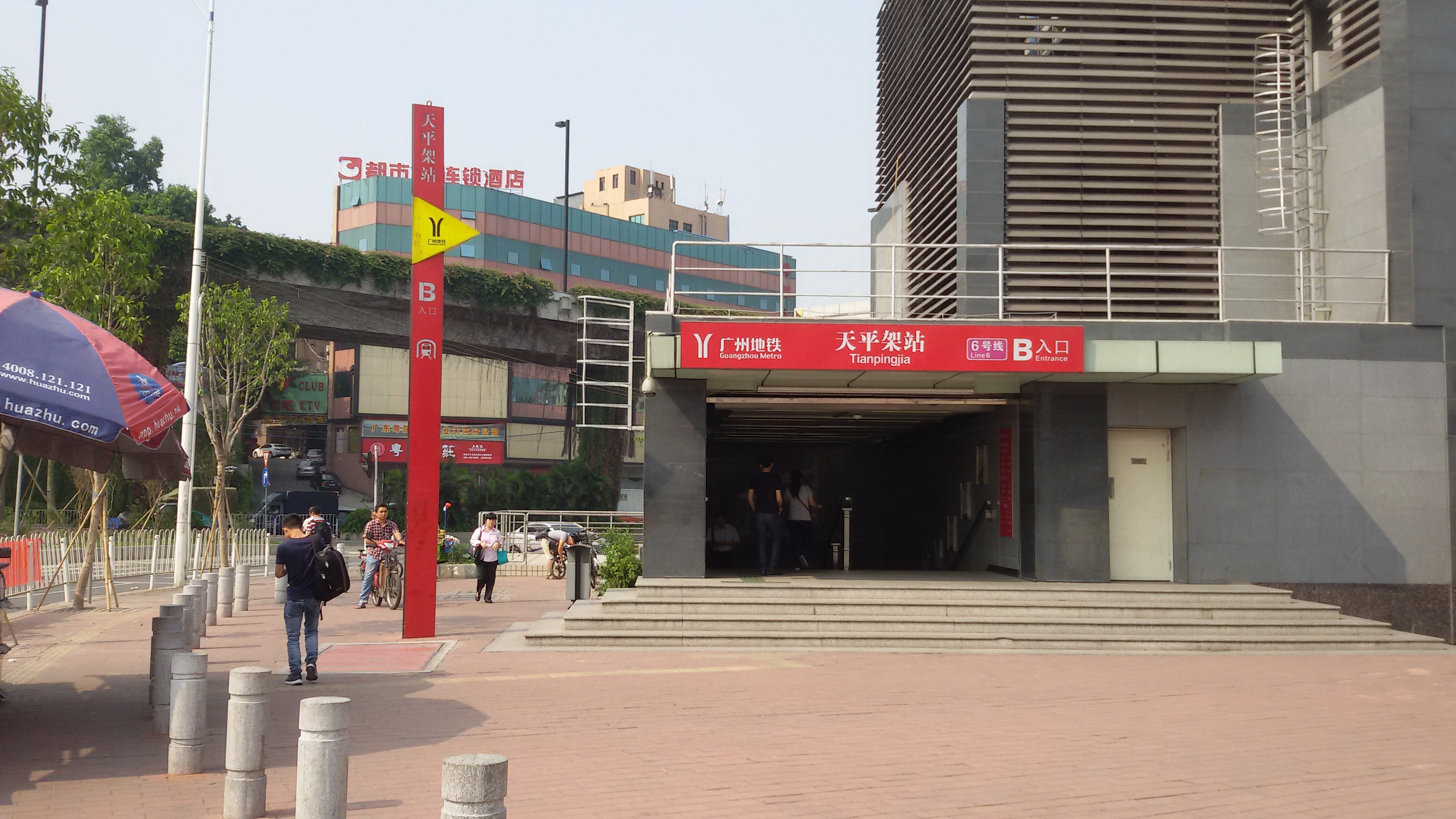
Entrance B

== History ==
In the 1997 "Guangzhou City Urban Expressway Traffic Network Planning Study (Final Report)", the then Line 7 had a Tianpingjia station, and later in the 2003 plan, the then Line 7 was renamed Line 6, and there was also a Tianpingjia station, and the location of the station was basically the same as the current one. Subsequently, the station officially started construction in 2009.

On 13 September 2012, the station and Donghu Station officially started the installation and construction of power supply equipment. On 9 October 2012, the boring tunnel machine completed the section between Shuiyin Road (now Shaheding and Tianpingjia, marking the completion of the first phase of the line constructed using the tunnel boring method.

On 28 December 2013, the station was put into use with the opening of Line 6 trial operation.
