= Yantang station =

Guangzhou Metro interchange station

Coordinates: 23.1599°N 113.3270°E

Yantang 燕塘
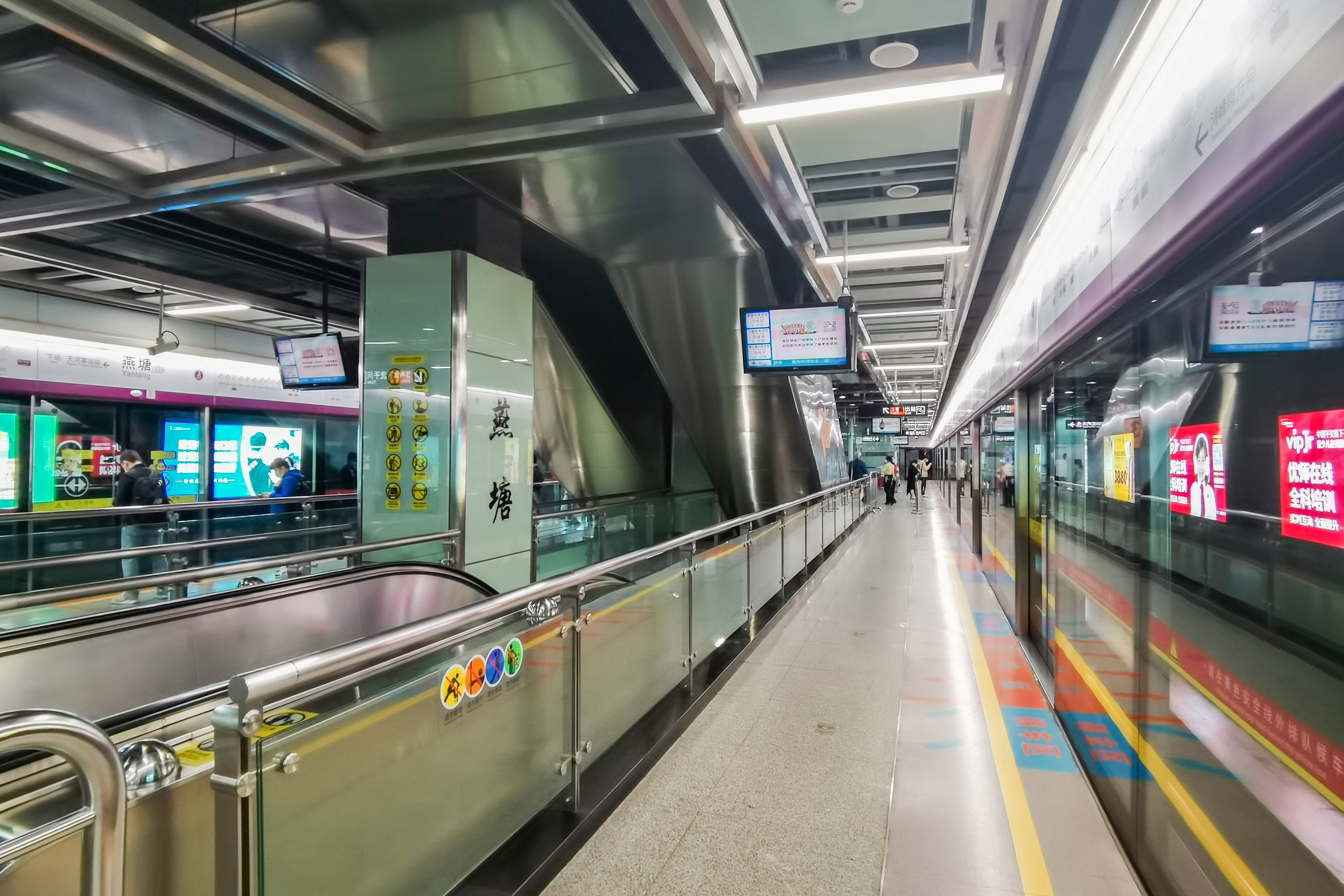
- Line 6 platform

Chinese name
- Chinese: 燕塘站
Transcriptions
Standard Mandarin
- Hanyu Pinyin: Yāntáng Zhàn
Yue: Cantonese
- Yale Romanization: Yintòhng Jaahm
- Jyutping: Jin^{3}tong^{4} Zaam^{6}
- Hong Kong Romanization: Yin Tong station

General information
- Location: Tianhe District, Guangzhou, Guangdong; China
- Operated by: Guangzhou Metro Co. Ltd.
- Lines: Line 3; Line 6
- Platforms: 4 (2 island platforms)
- Tracks: 4

Construction
- Structure type: Underground
- Accessible: Yes

Other information
- Station code: 319 620

History
- Opened: 30 October 2010; 15 years ago {Line 3); 28 December 2013; 12 years ago (Line 6)

Services
Preceding station	Guangzhou Metro	Following station
Guangzhou East Railway Station towards Haibang	Line 3	Meihuayuan towards Airport North (Terminal 2)
Tianpingjia towards Xunfenggang	Line 6	Tianhe Coach Terminal towards Xiangxue
Location

Yantang Station (Chinese: 燕塘站; Cantonese Yale: Yintòhng Jaahm) is an interchange station between Line 3 and Line 6 of the Guangzhou Metro. The underground station is located on the Guangshan Highway (广汕公路) (Yantang Section) in the Tianhe District of Guangzhou. It started operation on 30 October 2010 and on 28 December 2013, became an interchange station between Lines 3 and 6.

== Station layout ==
G	Street level	Exits A-C
L1; Concourse	Lobby	Ticket Machines, Customer Service, Shops, Police Station, Safety Facilities, Flight information
L2; Buffer Area & Platforms	Buffer Area	Buffer area between Lobbies
L2; Buffer Area & Platforms	Platform 4	6 towards Xunfenggang (Tianpingjia)
L2; Buffer Area & Platforms	Island platform, doors will open on the left
L2; Buffer Area & Platforms	Platform 3	6 towards Xiangxue (Tianhe Coach Terminal)
L3; Concourse	Transfer Lobby	Transfer lobby between Lines 3 & 6
L4; Platforms	Platform 1	3 towards Haibang (Guangzhou East Railway Station)
L4; Platforms	Island platform, doors will open on the left
L4; Platforms	Platform 2	3 towards Airport North (Meihuayuan)

== Exits ==
Exit number	Exit location
Exit A	Yanxing Lu
Exit B	Yangling Lu
Exit C	Yanling Lu

== Gallery ==
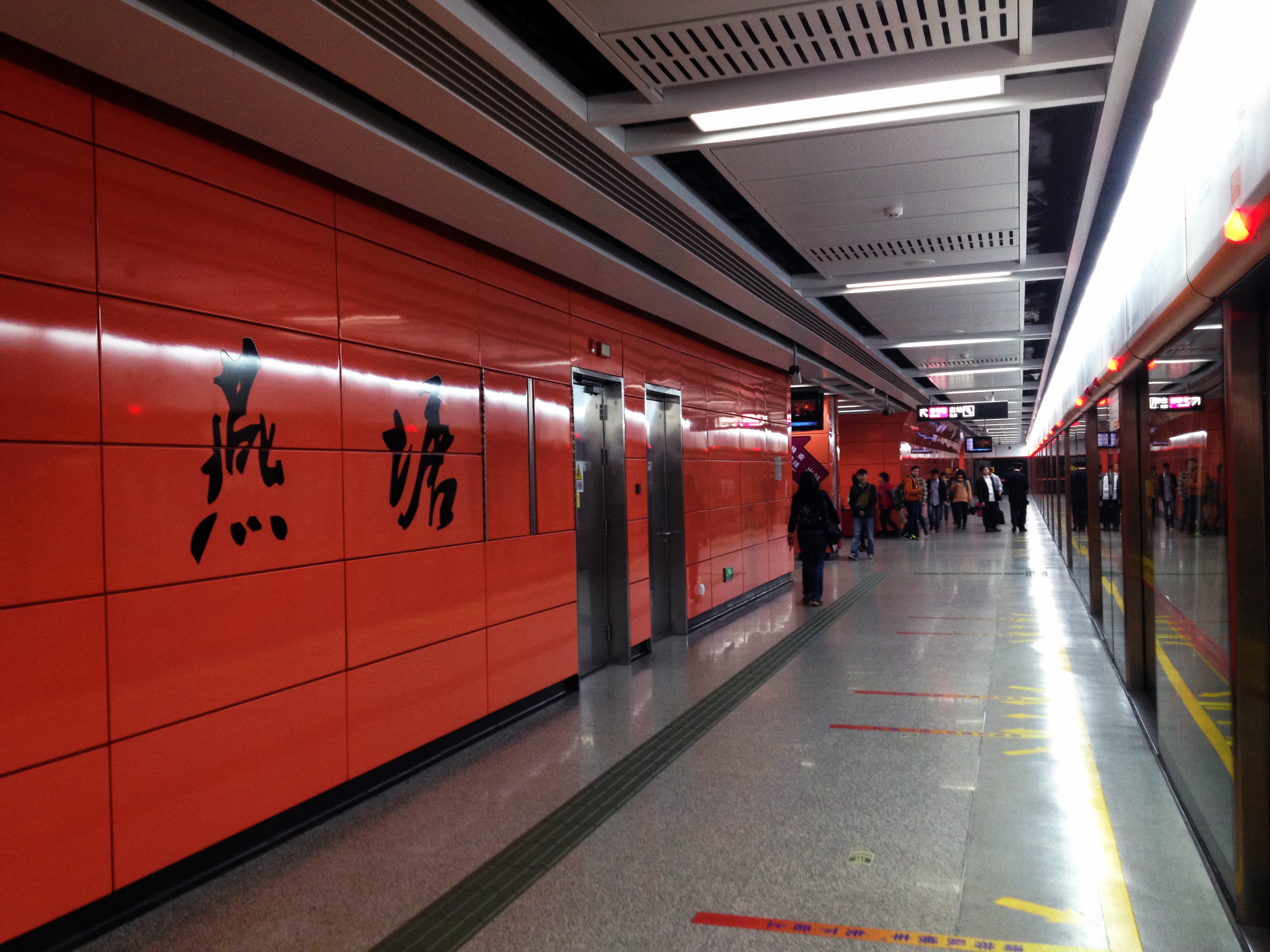
Platform 1 (Line 3 southbound platform)

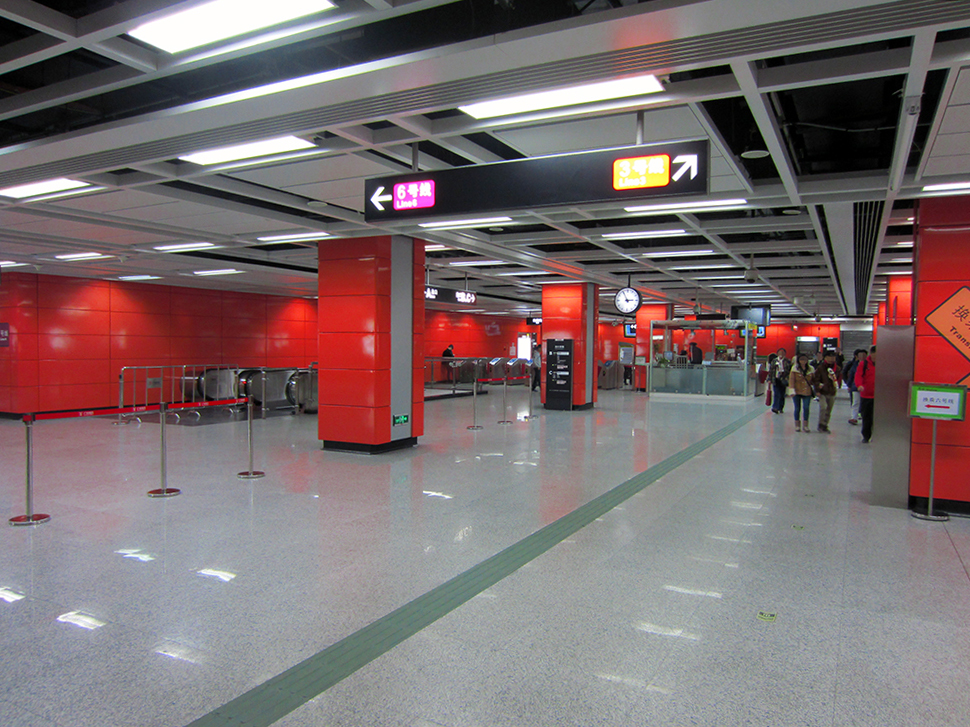
Concourse

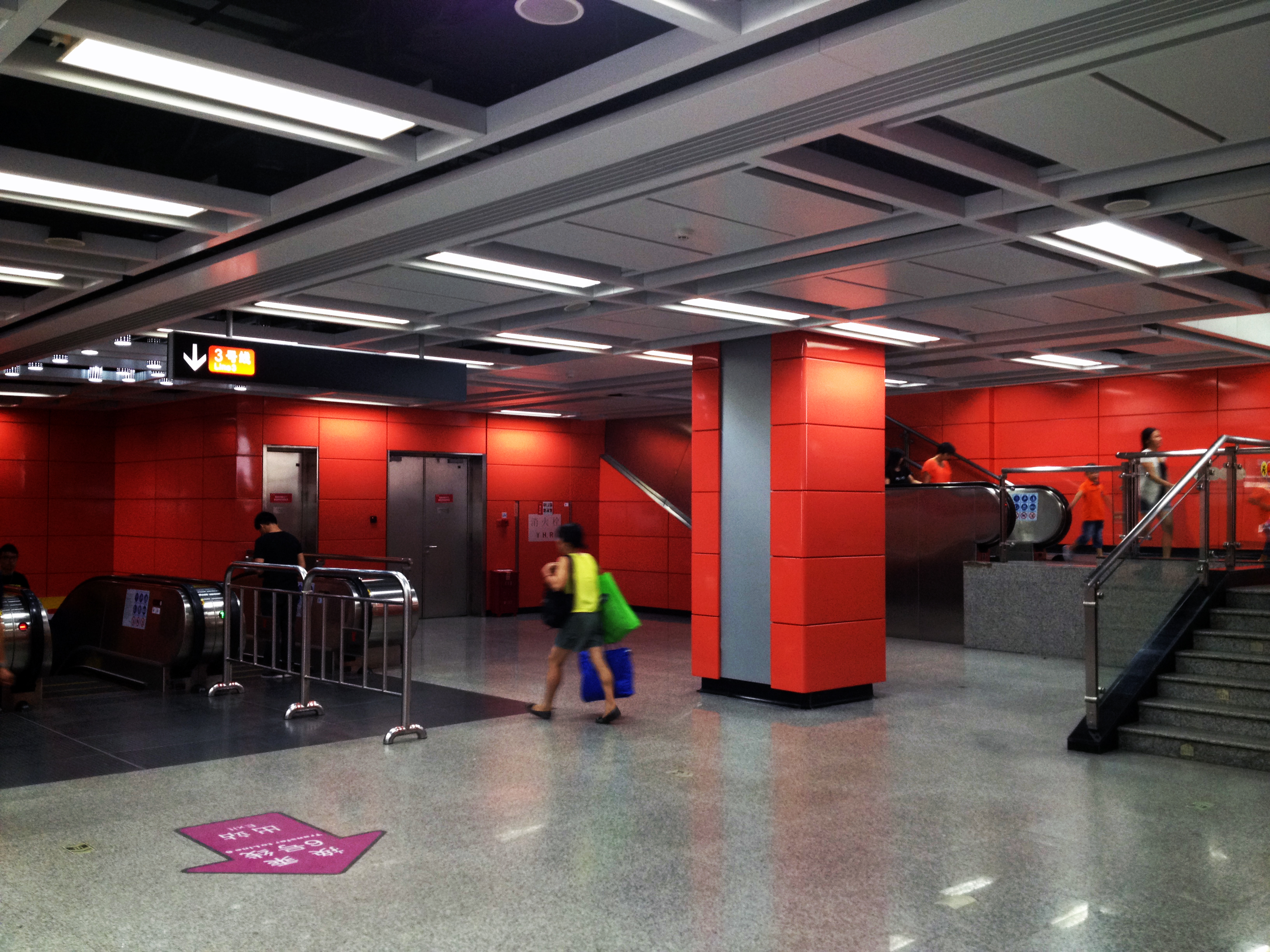
Transfer level
