= Shahe station (Guangzhou Metro) =

Guangzhou Metro Line 6 and Line 11 station

Shahe 沙河
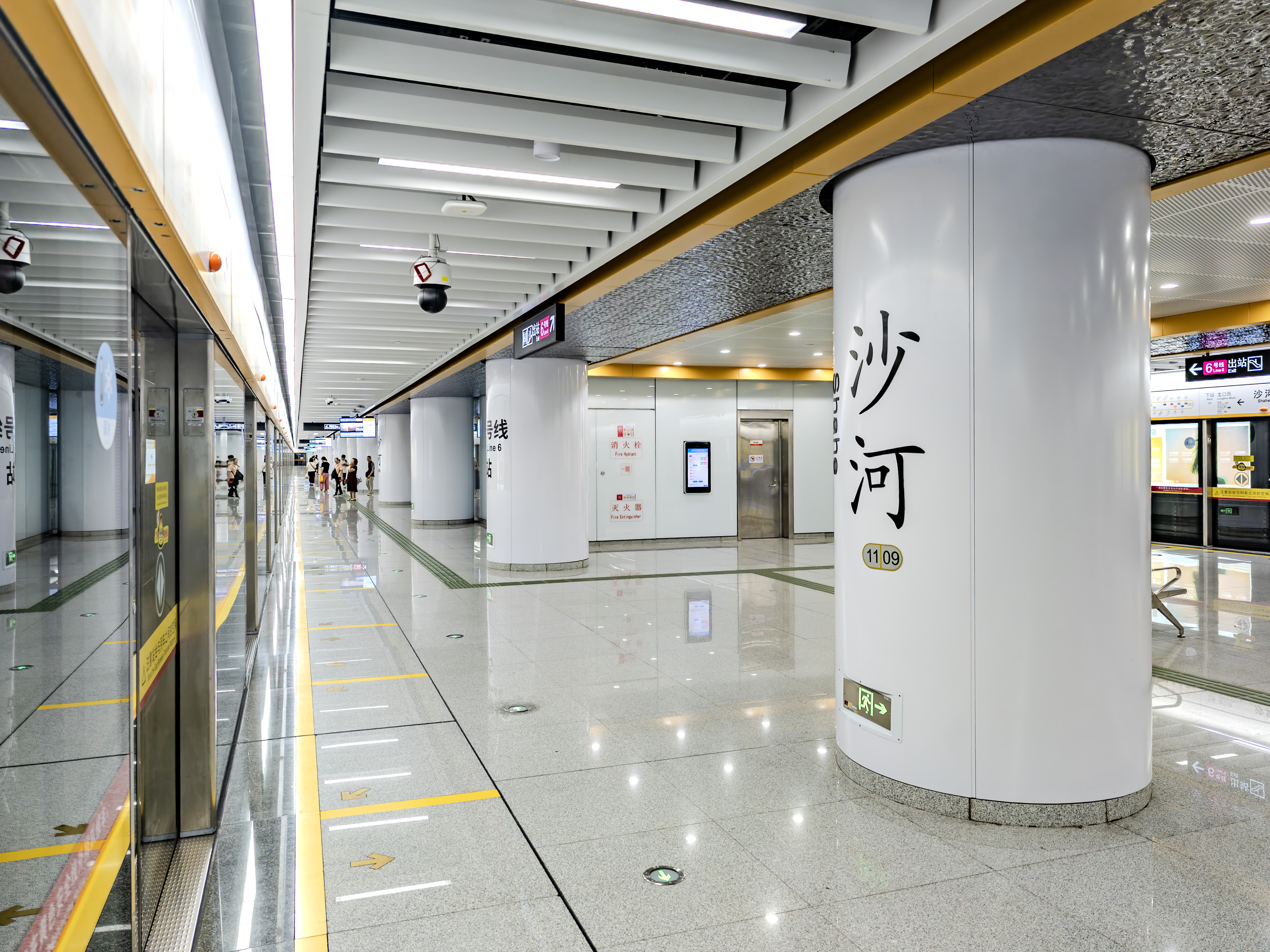
- Line 11 platform

Chinese name
- Chinese: 沙河站
Transcriptions
Standard Mandarin
- Hanyu Pinyin: Shāhé Zhàn
Yue: Cantonese
- Yale Romanization: Sāahǒ Jaahm
- Jyutping: Saa^{1}ho^{1} Zaam^{6}

General information
- Location: Northwest of intersection of Xianlie East Road (先烈东路) and Guangzhou Avenue North (广州大道北), Shahe Subdistrict; Tianhe District, Guangzhou, Guangdong; China
- Coordinates: 23°9′19″N 113°18′17″E
- Operator: Guangzhou Metro Co. Ltd.
- Lines: Line 6; Line 11
- Platforms: 4 (2 island platforms)
- Tracks: 4

Construction
- Structure type: Underground
- Accessible: Yes

Other information
- Station code: 618 1109

History
- Opened: 28 December 2024 (19 months ago)

Services
Preceding station	Guangzhou Metro	Following station
Shaheding towards Xunfenggang	Line 6	Tianpingjia towards Xiangxue
Yuntai Garden Outer Circle	Line 11	Guangzhou East Railway Station Inner Circle
Location

Shahe Station (Chinese: 沙河站; pinyin: Shāhé Zhàn; Cantonese Yale: Sāahǒ Jaahm) is an interchange station between Line 6 and Line 11 of the Guangzhou Metro. It started operations on 28 December 2024. It is located underground at the northwest of the intersection of Xianlie East Road and Guangzhou Avenue North in Tianhe District.

Due to the demolition of houses, this station could not be opened at the same time as other stations on Line 6. Later, due to changes in the planning of the relevant plots and a collapse accident, the opening time of this station was forced to be postponed. Finally, the station was opened on 28 December 2024, simultaneously with Line 11 and became a transfer station for the two lines, making it the fifth station in Guangzhou Metro to be opened directly as a transfer station after Wanshengwei, Chebeinan, Changgang and Gaozeng stations.

== Interchange style ==
There are 41 escalators in this station, which is one of the three stations with more than 40 escalators on the whole of Line 11, the other two being Guangzhou University of Chinese Medicine station and Caihong Bridge station. In terms of transfer, the station was originally planned to adopt the node transfer mode, with a passageway connecting the transfer level above the platforms of Platform 6 and Line 11 and connecting it through escalators and stairs. Considering that there is a very large capacity gap between Line 6 and Line 11, the transfer node is only a one-way passage from Line 6 to Line 11. Later, due to the adjustment of the station design, this node was not implemented, and now both lines must be transferred through the first basement level concourse.

== Station layout ==
G	Ground-level lobby	Exits A and B, Ticket Machines, Customer Service, Shops, Police Station, Security Facilities
Mezzanine	Transfer passageway	Passageway between underground lobby and Exit C, Station Equipment
L1	Underground lobby	Ticket Machines, Customer Service, Toilets, Nursery, Security Facilities
L2	Mezzanine	Passageway between lobbies and Line 11 platforms
L3; 6 Platforms	Platform 2	6 towards Xunfenggang (Shaheding)
L3; 6 Platforms	Split-island Platform, doors will open on the left
L3; 6 Platforms		Passageway between platforms
L3; 6 Platforms	Split-island Platform, doors will open on the left
L3; 6 Platforms	Platform 1	6 towards Xiangxue (Tianpingjia)
L4; 11 Platforms	Platform 3	11 Outer Circle (Yuntai Garden)
L4; 11 Platforms	Island platform, doors will open on the left
L4; 11 Platforms	Platform 4	11 Inner Circle (Guangzhou East Railway Station)

=== Entrances/exits ===
The station has 5 points of entry/exit. Exits A and B are equipped with ramps.

- A: Xianlie East Road
- B: Xianlie East Road
- C: Xianlie East Road, Southern Medical University Stomatological Hospital (Guangdong Stomatological Hospital) Shahe Campus
- D: Guangzhou Avenue North
- E: Guangzhou Avenue North, Guangyuan East Road
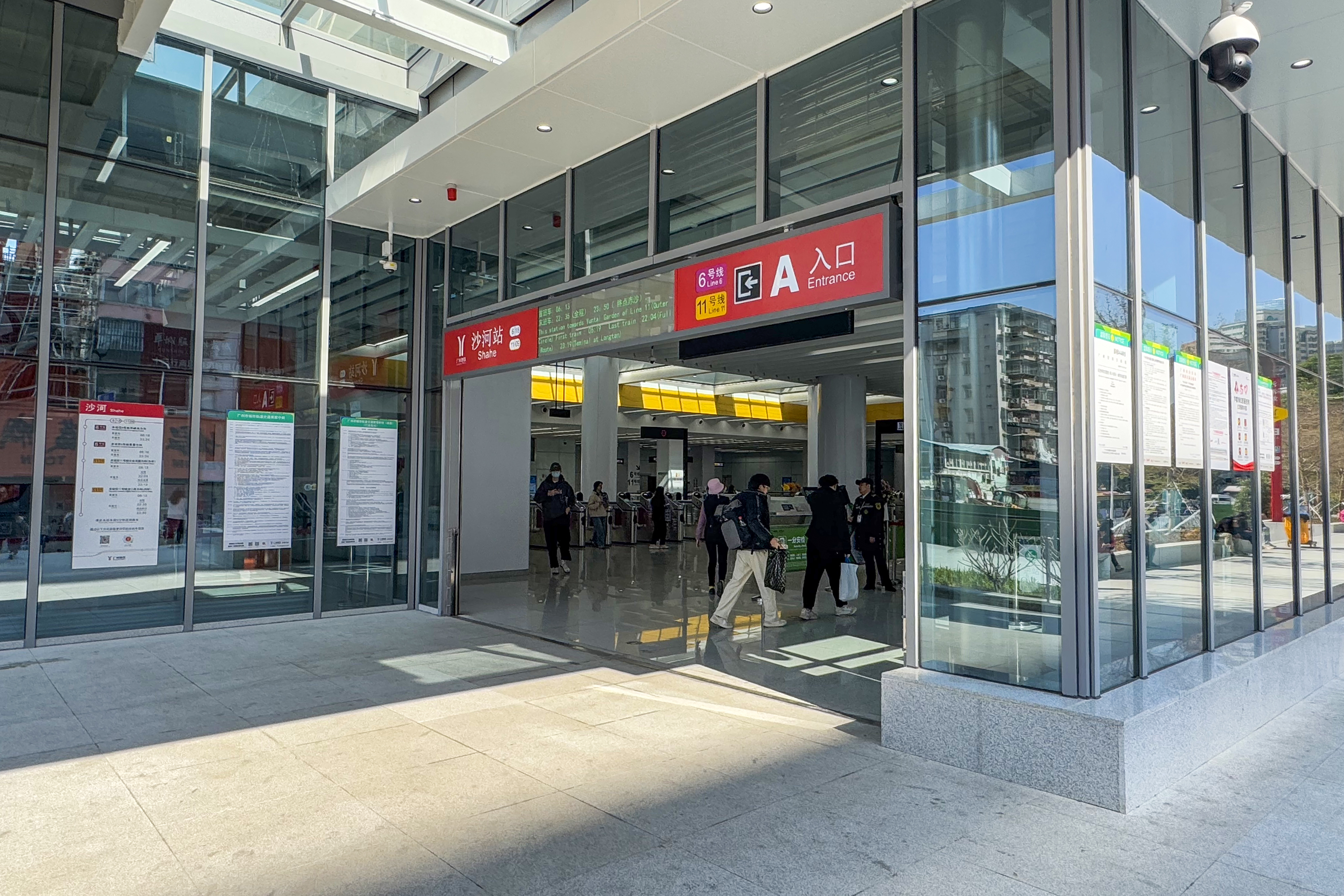
Entrance A

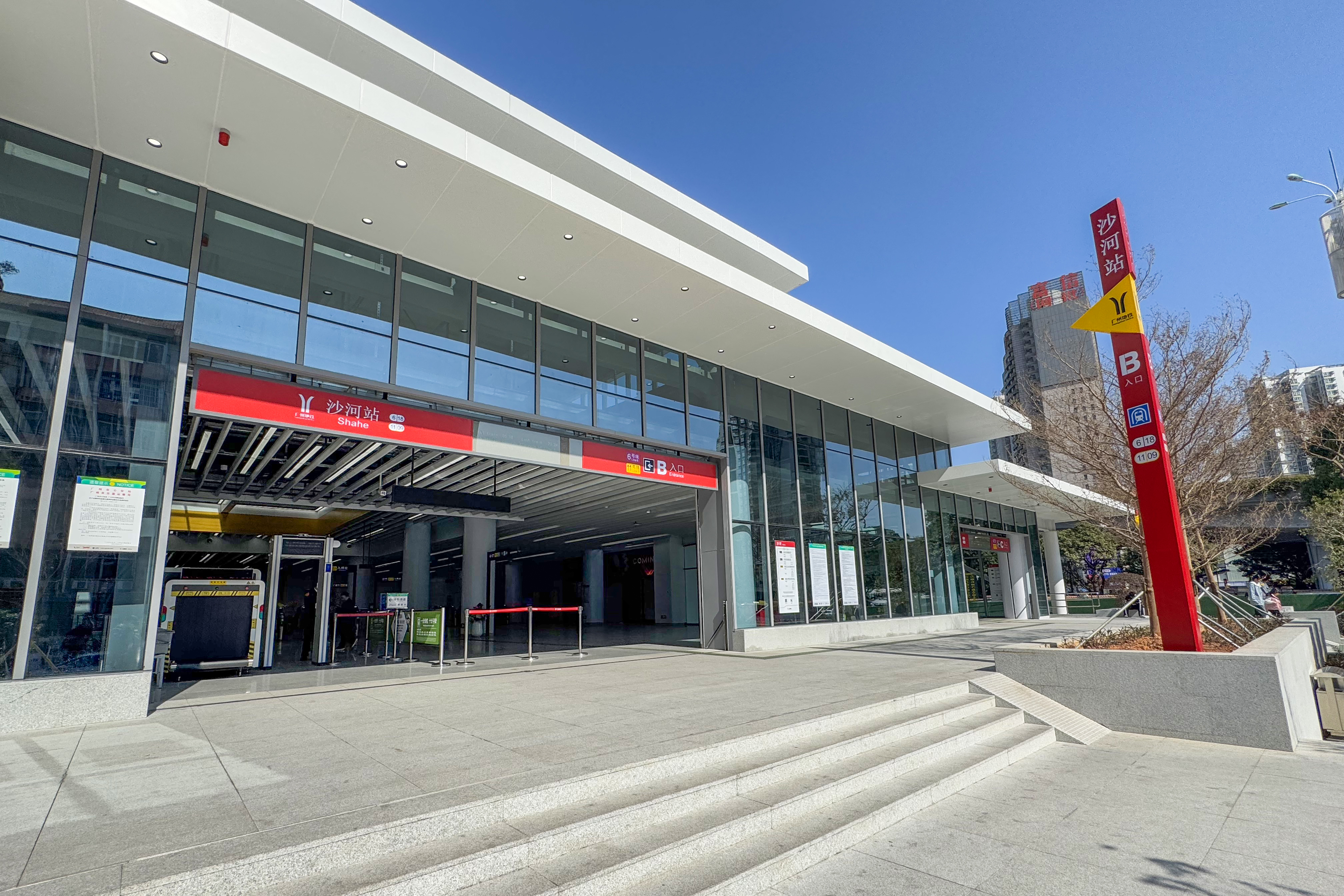
Entrance B

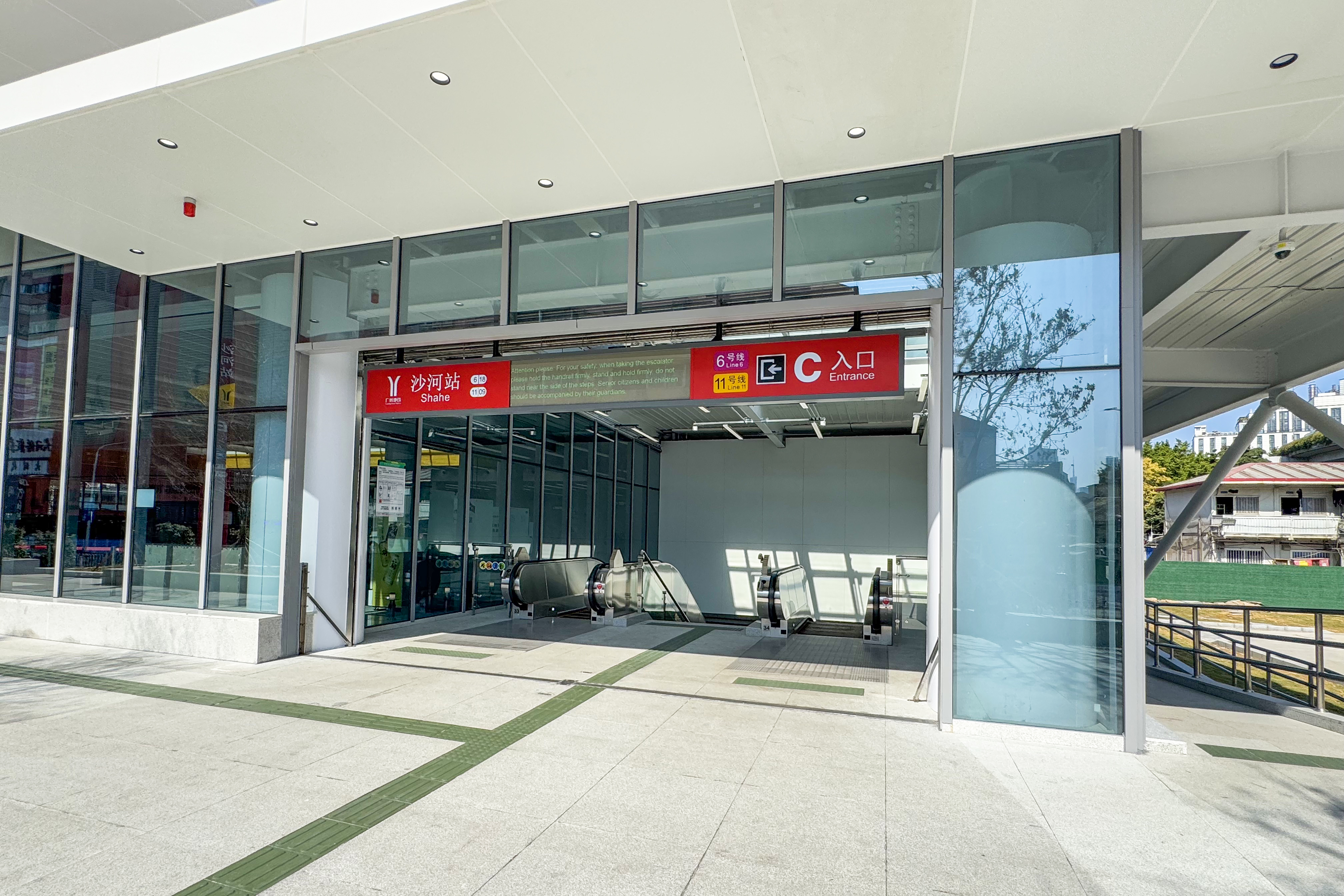
Entrance C

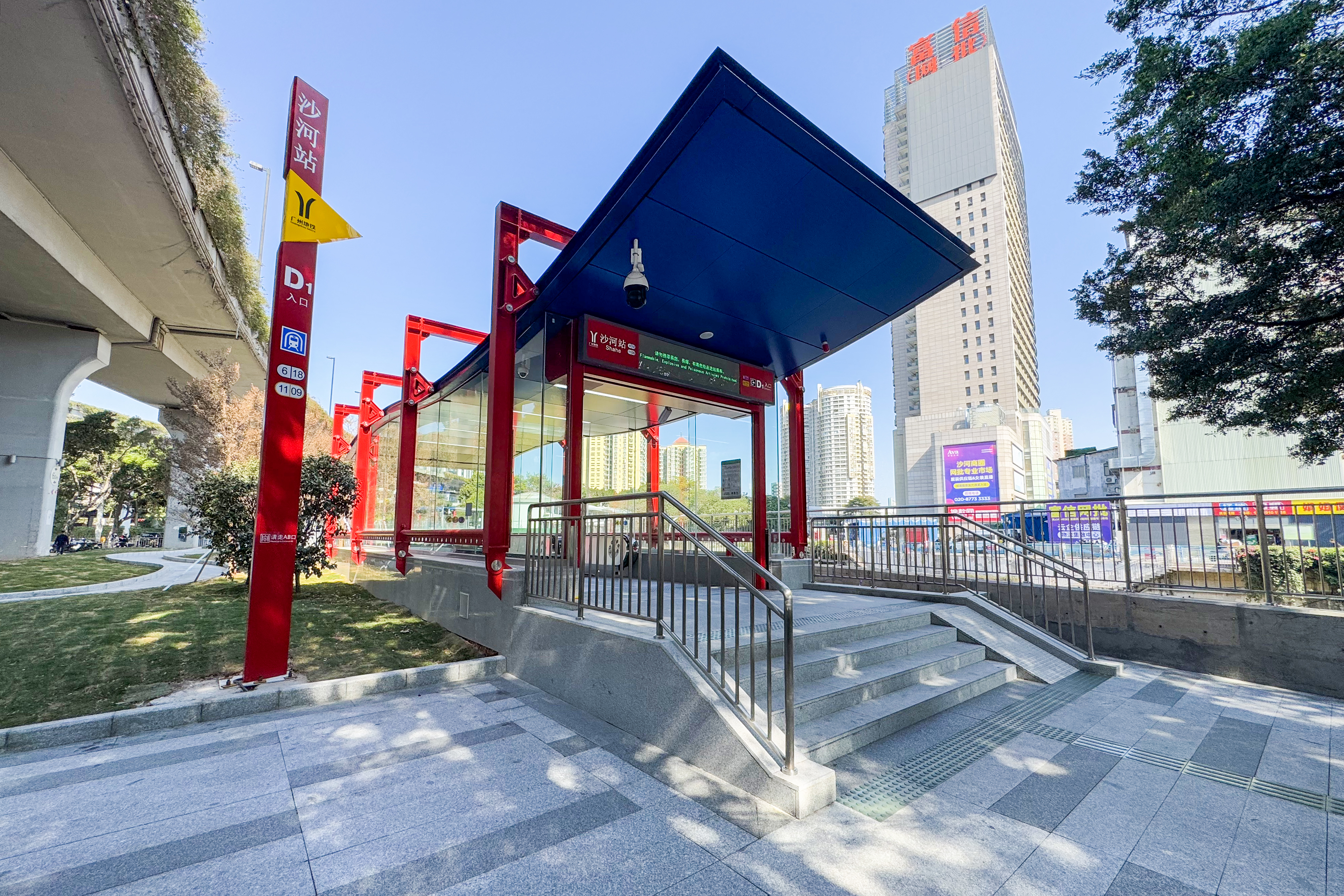
Entrance D1

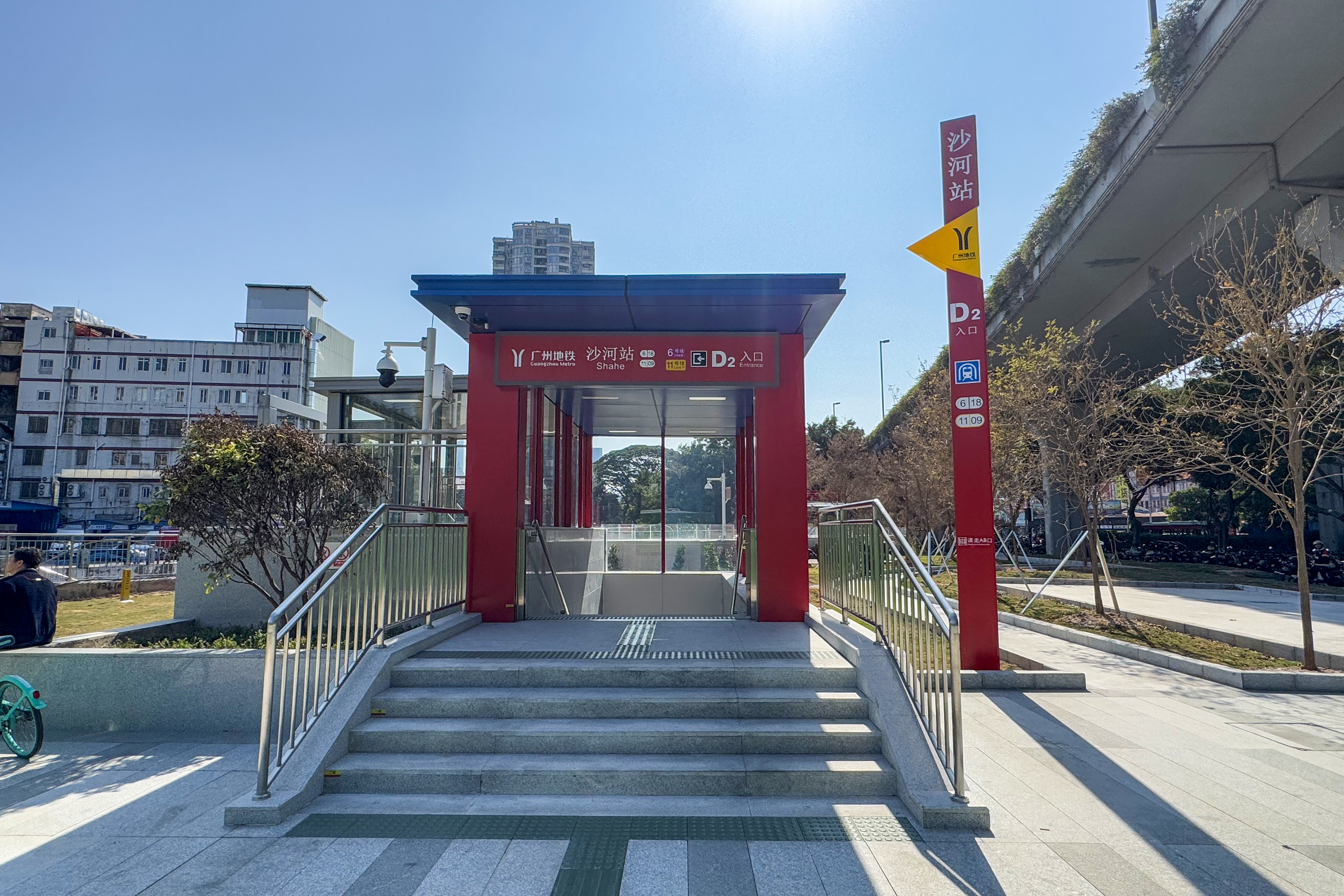
Entrance D2

== Gallery ==
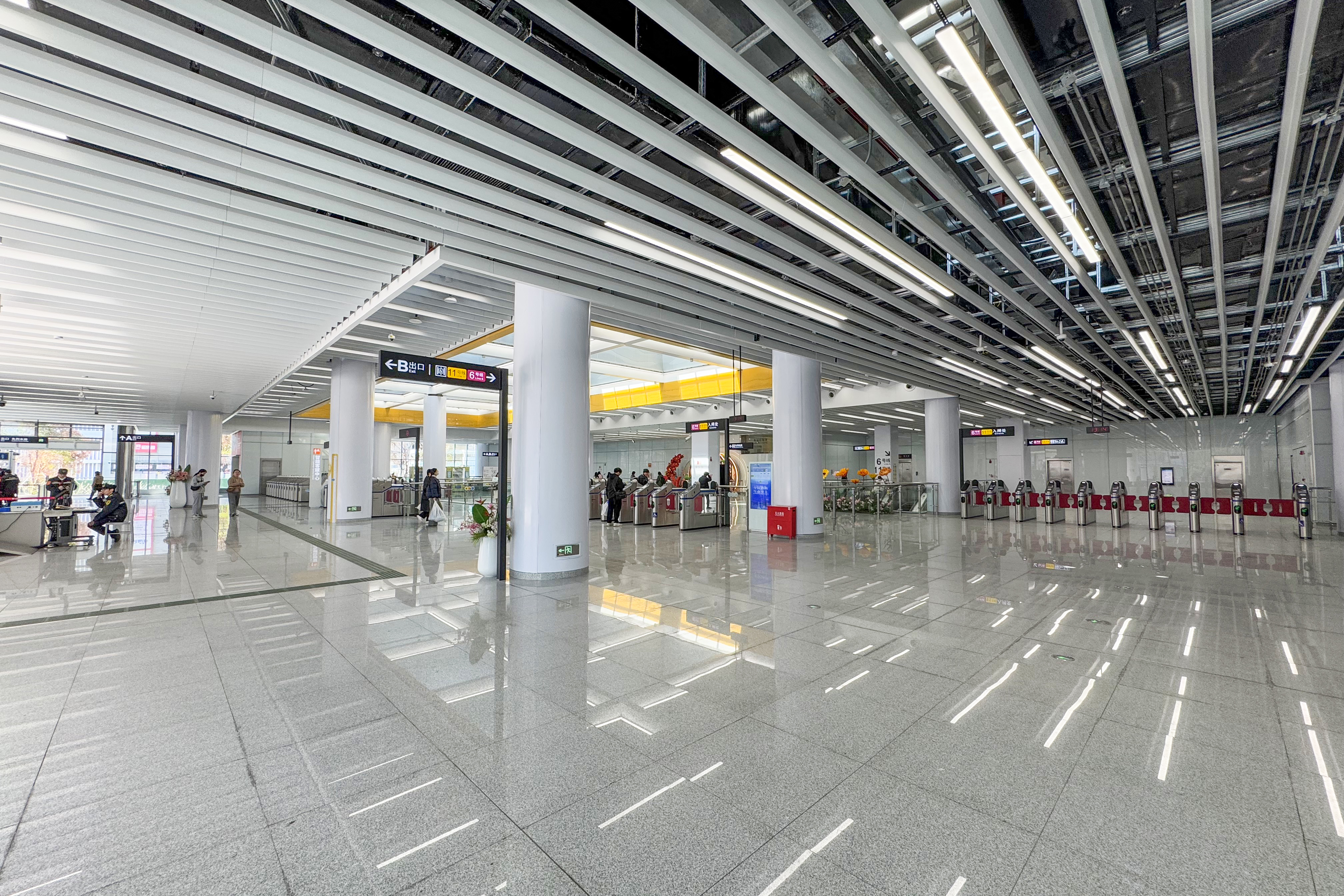
Ground-level concourse

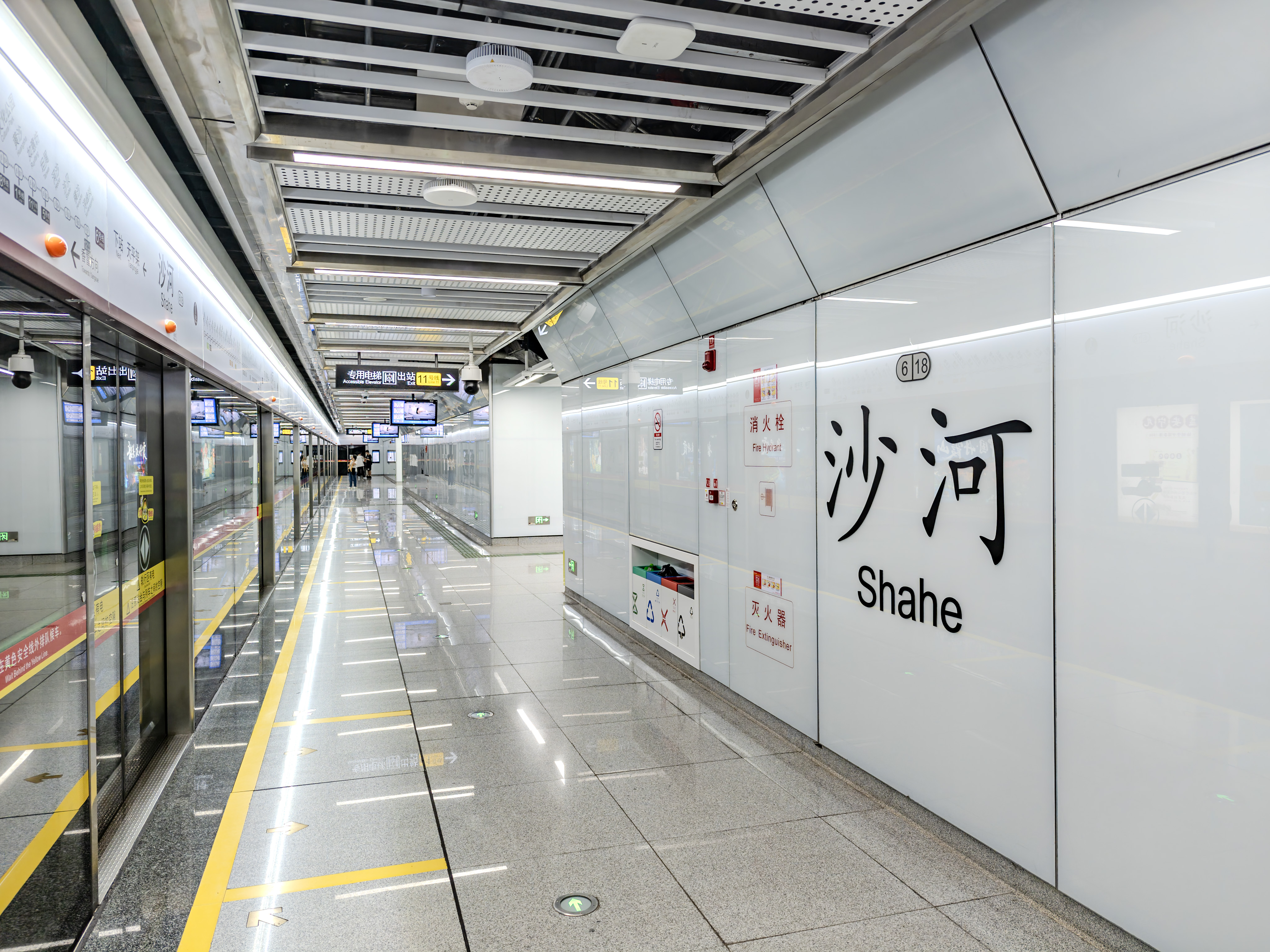
Line 6 Platform 1

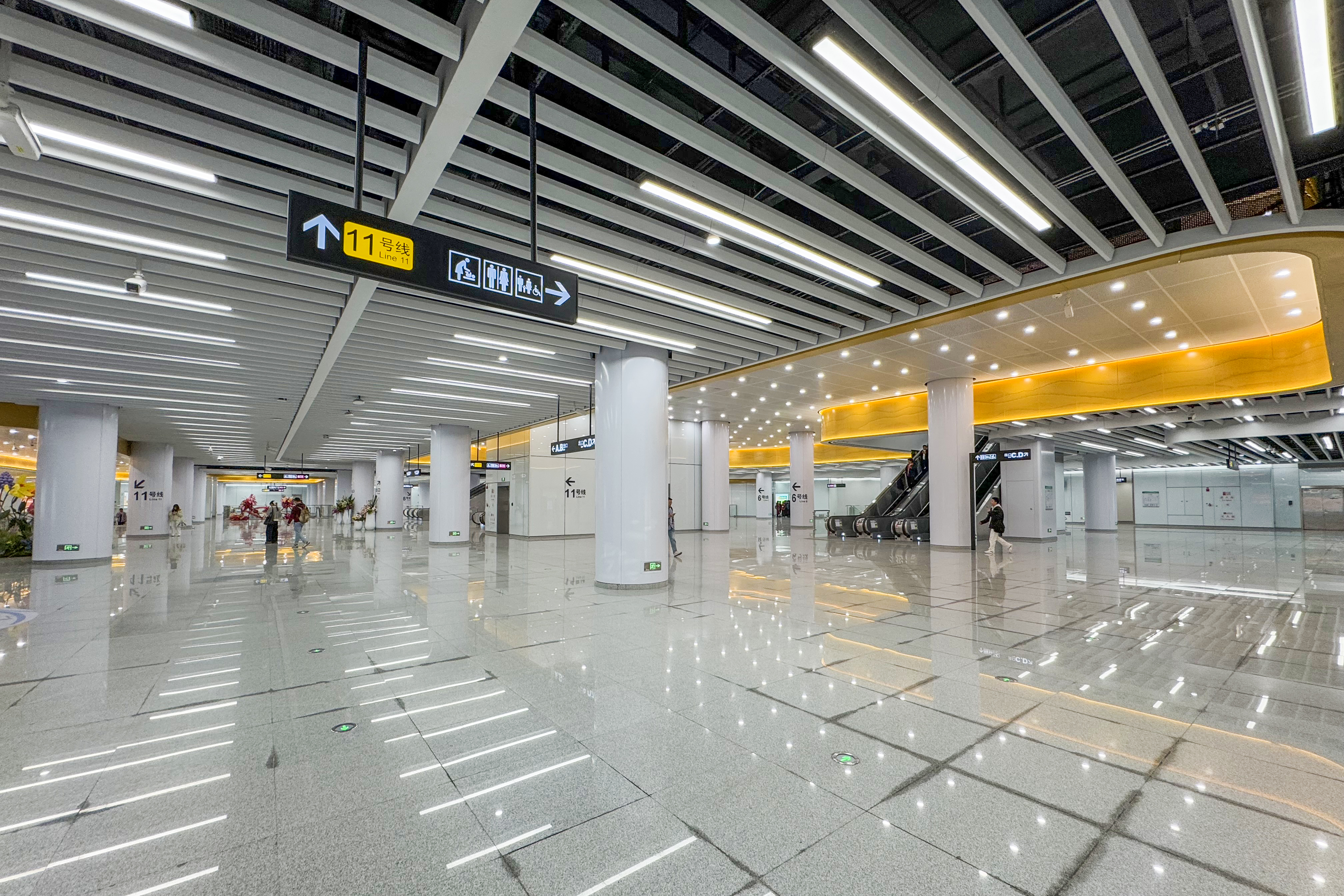
Underground concourse (western side of paid area)

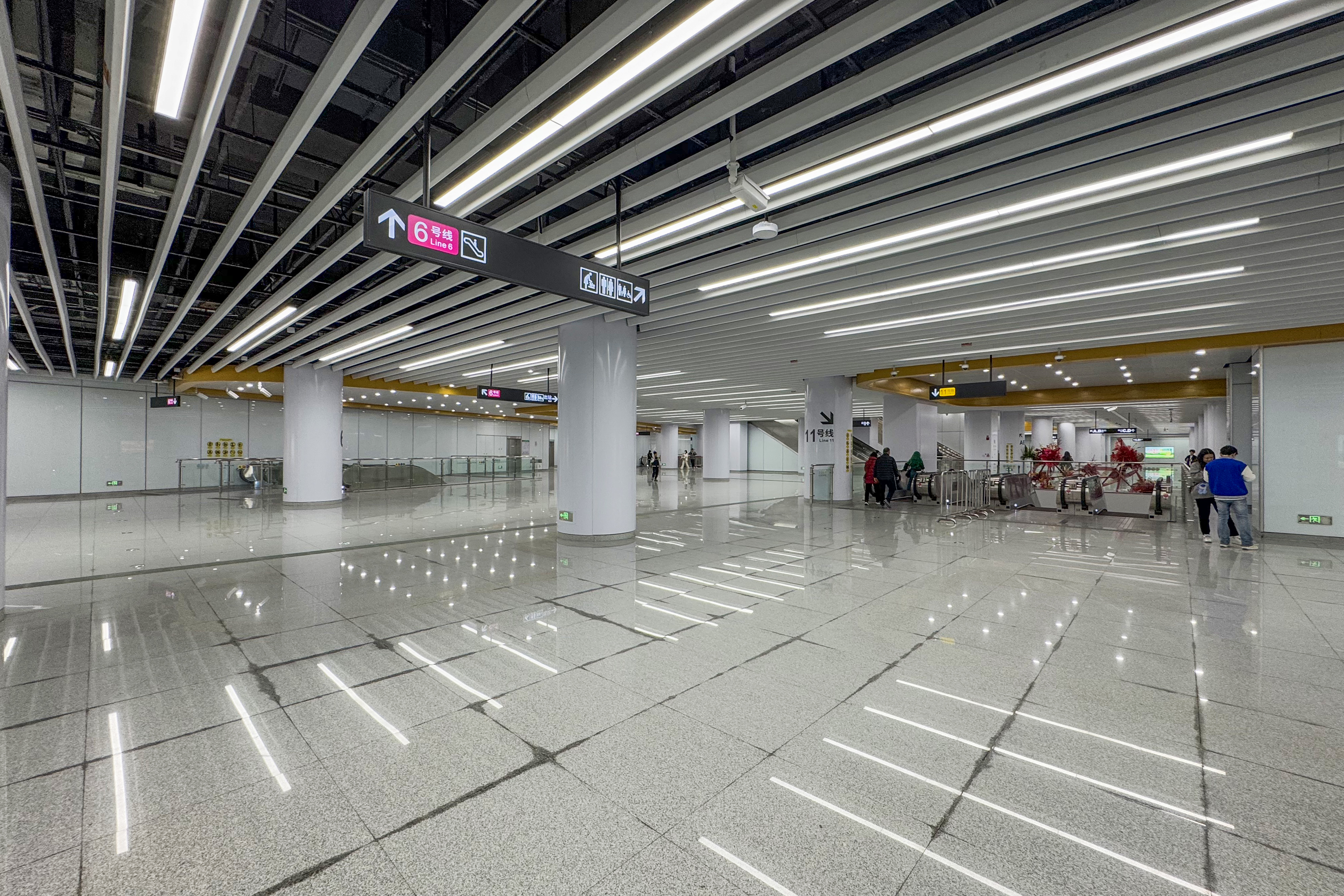
Underground concourse (eastern side of paid area)

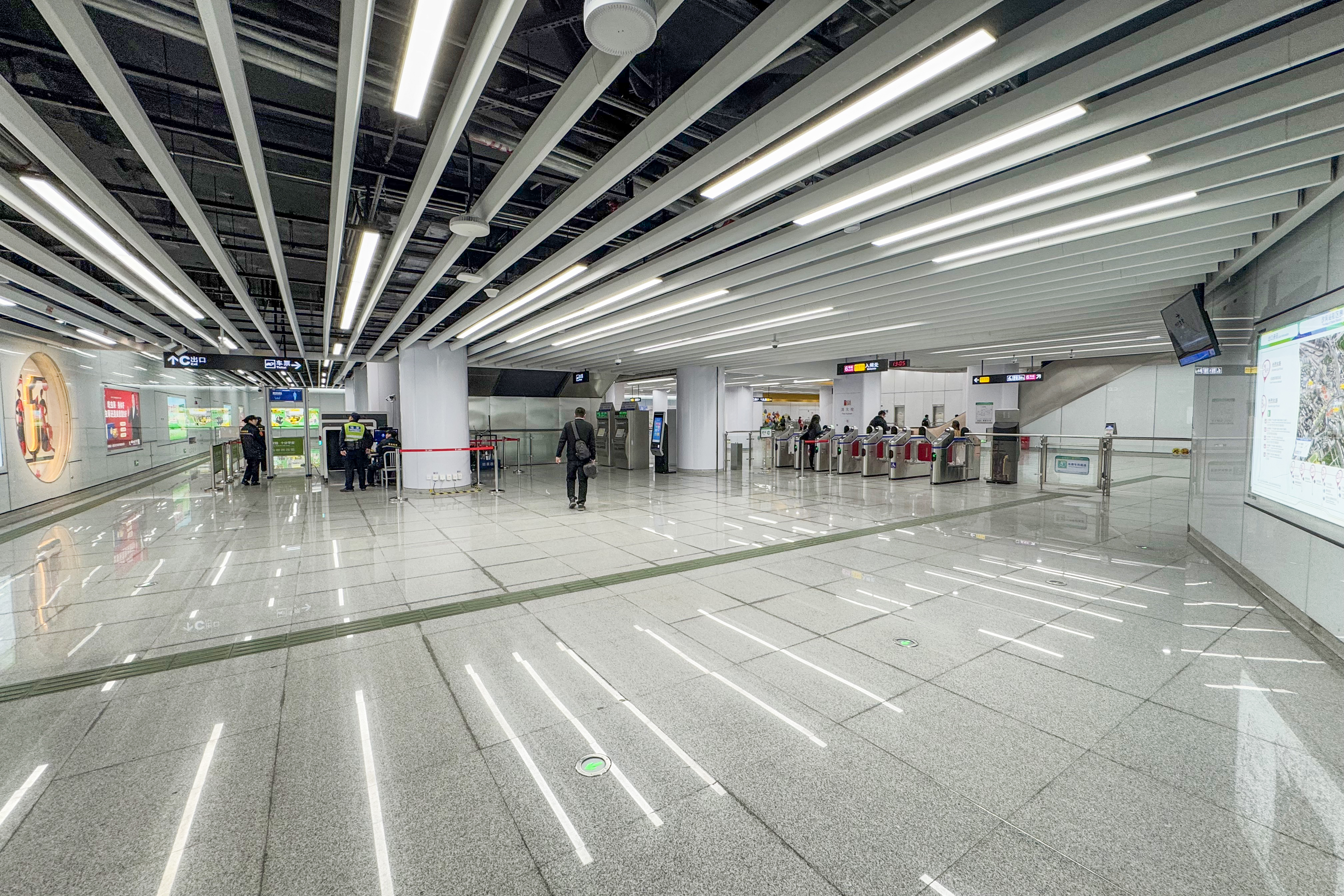
Underground concourse (non paid area)

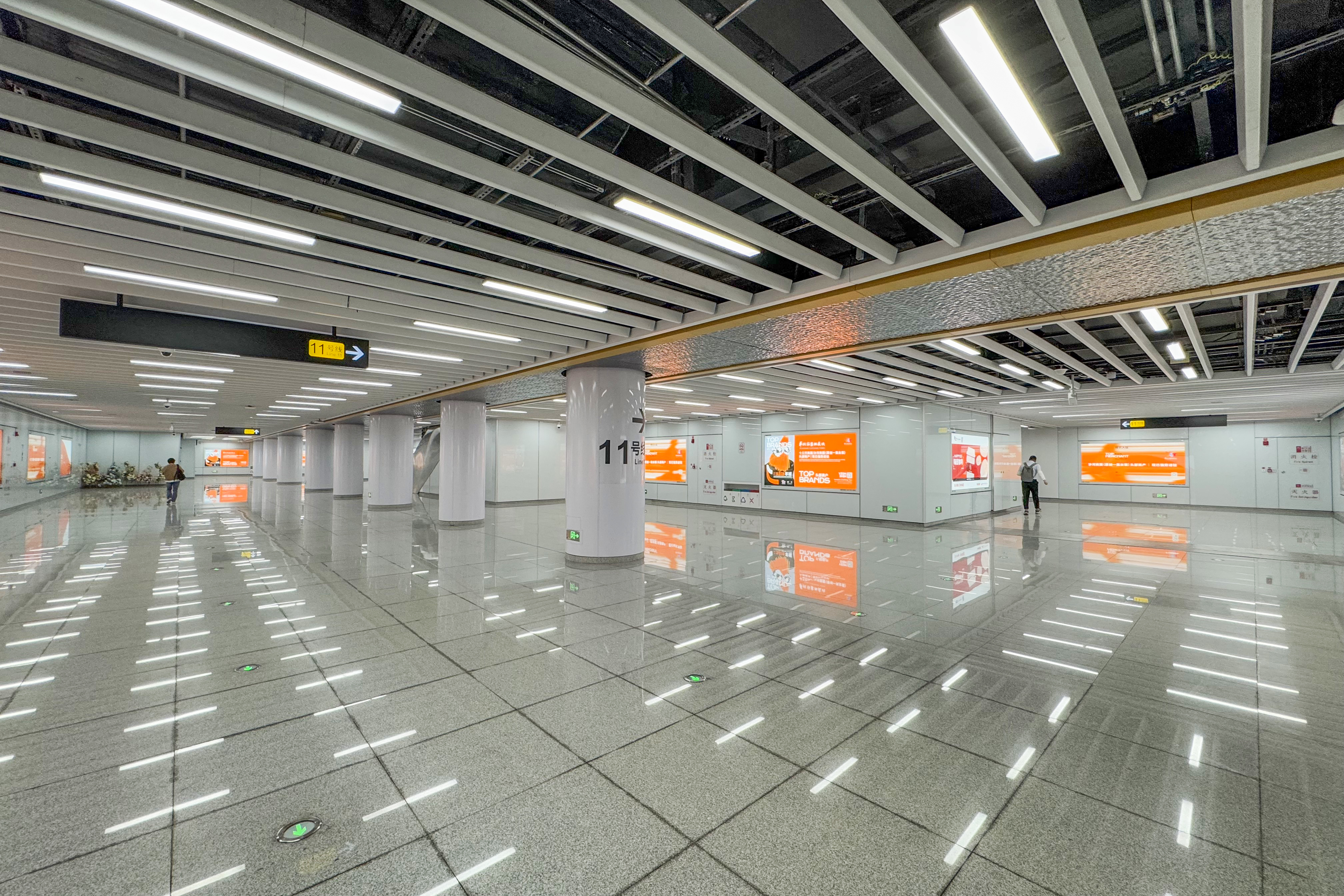
Interchange section of underground concourse

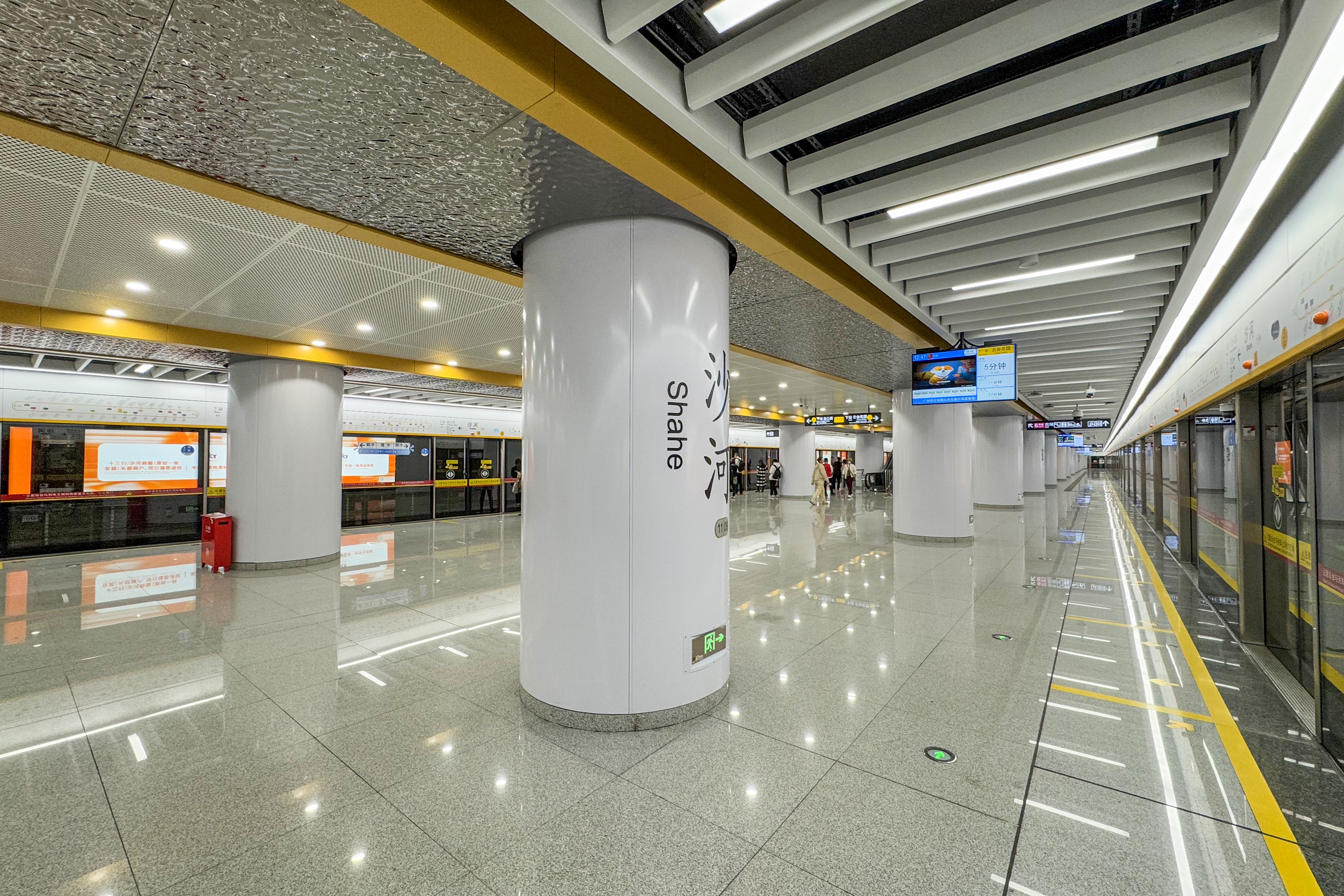
Line 11 platform view

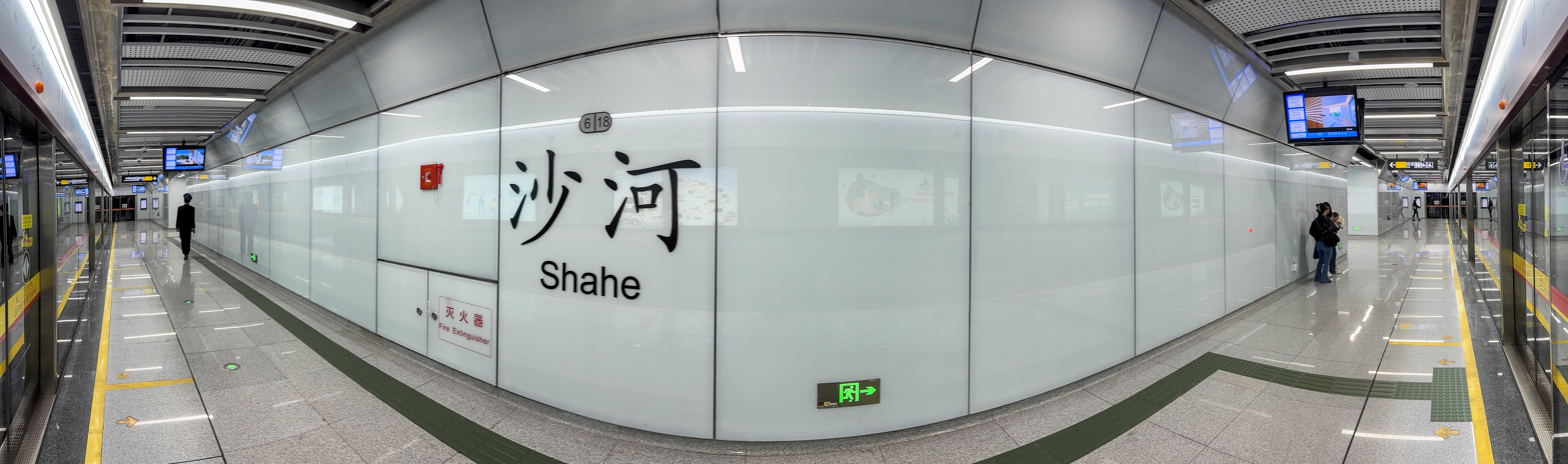
Line 6 platform 2 panorama

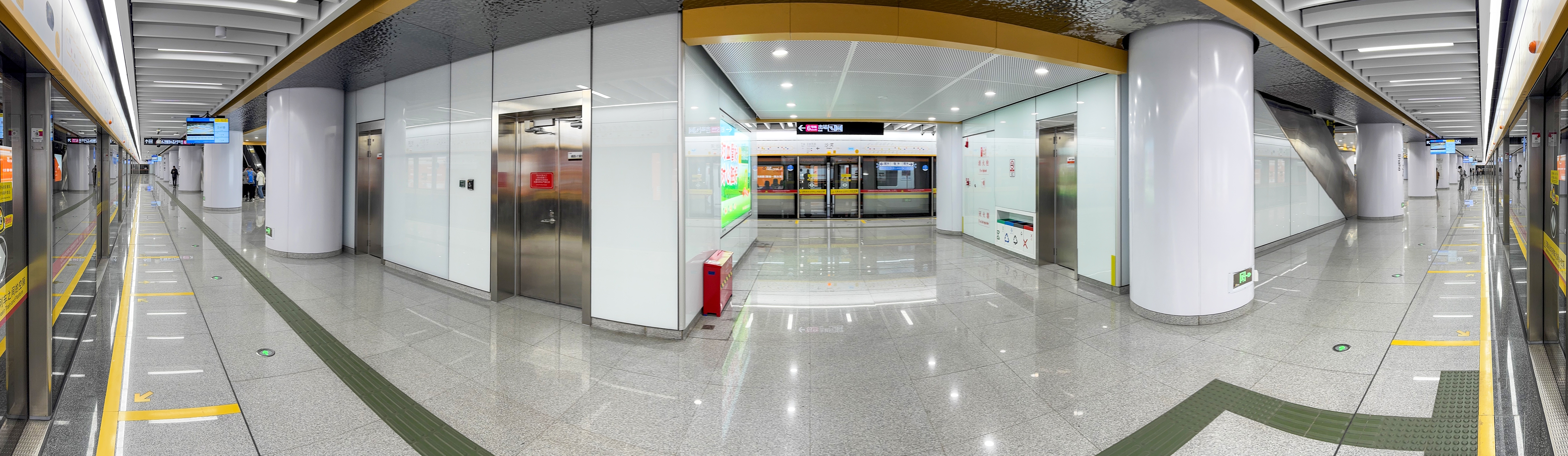
Line 11 platform 4 panorama

== History ==
In the 1997 "Guangzhou City Urban Expressway, Traffic Network Planning Study (Final Report)", the station was set up on Line 7 (now Line 6), and the location was essentially the same as the current one. Later, in the 2003 proposal, the then Line 7 was renamed the current Line 6, which also includes this station. The original design of the station has four floors, the first and second underground floors are the basement of the super-structured property, the third underground floor is the concourse and equipment area, and the fourth underground floor is the Line 6 platform. However, in 2008, with the re-emergence of a new round of rail traffic line network planning plan in Guangzhou, there was also an interchange at the station between a circular line and Line 6, and at the same time, due to the change of the station plot plan, the original planned development of the covered property was changed to a public green space. However, due to the difficulties in demolition and relocation in the early stage, and after Line 11 was included in the 12th Five-Year Plan for Rail Transportation in Guangzhou and was approved, the station will be coordinated and constructed together with the Line 11 station and is planned to be simultaneously open with it. When the station was built on Line 11, the transfer conditions for Line 26 were also reserved.

At the time of construction of the first phase of Line 6, the station had only completed the civil works of the Line 6 platform, as well as the necessary equipment and basic lighting facilities, and had not carried out any decoration and installation of facilities such as screen doors.

The construction of the main structure of the station was completed at the end of 2023. On 30 August 2024, the station completed the "three rights" transfer. Ground traffic on Xianlie East Road resumed shortly after. On December 28 the same year, the station was put into use with the opening of Line 11.

=== Demolition difficulty ===
Construction of the first phase of Line 6 began in 2005, but due to the problem of housing demolition, the station was unable to build the concourse and equipment floors, and only the underground excavation of the platform layer tunnel was completed, so it could not be opened with the opening of the first phase of Line 6, and the train passed through the station non-stop for a long time. The requisition, demolition and construction of the station was later incorporated into the construction of Line 11.

On 3 February 2019, the Tianhe District People's Government issued the Decision on the Expropriation of Houses on State-Owned Land at Shahe Station of Guangzhou Rail Transit Line 11. On April 29, the expropriation of 102 households was completed and the demolition of the buildings concerned commenced on the same day.

== Collapse incident ==
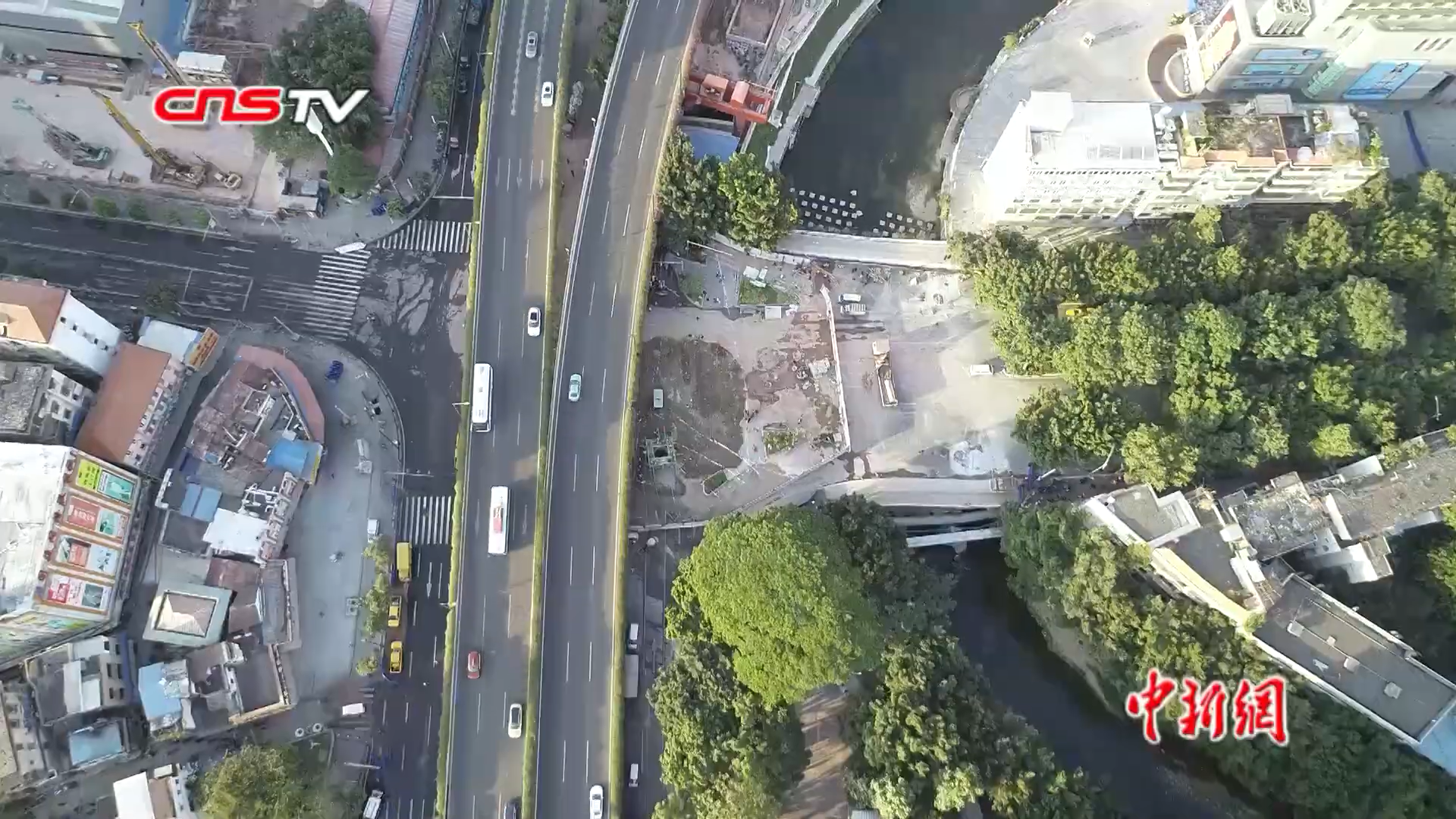
The rescue site reported in the news the day after the collapse accident, at this time, the slope of the collapse area has been reinforced with concrete

At 09:28 on 1 December 2019, the ground collapsed at the junction of Guangzhou Avenue North and Yudong Road West next to the construction site of Line 11, resulting in a sewage cleaning truck and an electric bicycle falling into the pit, and 3 people went missing. The next day, Guangzhou Metro stated that the collapse was not caused by the construction of the tunnel boring machine, and continued to search for the trapped people after reinforcing the slope in the collapsed area. All the missing people were eventually found on 10 January 2020, and all of them were killed by the collapse.

In May 2020, the Guangzhou Municipal Emergency Management Bureau released an accident investigation report. The investigation team determined that the direct cause of the accident was the superposition of factors such as the special geological environment encountered in the construction of the underground excavation method, which caused the permeable collapse of the vault. At the time of the accident, the underground team leader led the 5 operators to evacuate safely in an orderly manner in accordance with the emergency plan, and no casualties were caused in the shaft. However, after discovering the water seepage, the construction unit failed to enclose the collapsed road surface in time, resulting in the death of three passerby. According to the investigation report, the direct economic loss of the accident was about 20.047 million yuan. The investigation team recommended that the two people in charge of the construction project who were directly responsible for the accident be investigated for criminal responsibility, and also that 9 relevant personnel of the enterprises involved, and 5 personnel of the regulatory department be given party discipline, government sanctions and accountability.

On 31 December 2021, Zhou, the safety director and actual person in charge of the Shahe Station underground excavation civil engineering project, and Wang Moumou, the chief engineer and technical person in charge of the project, were all sentenced to three years in prison and three years of probation by the Tianhe District People's Court for the crime of major liability accidents.

== Future development ==
In addition to the transfer node on the Line 11 platform, the interface of the transfer passageway is also reserved in the underground concourse for the planned Line 26.
