= Line 6 (Guangzhou Metro) =

Line of the Guangzhou Metro

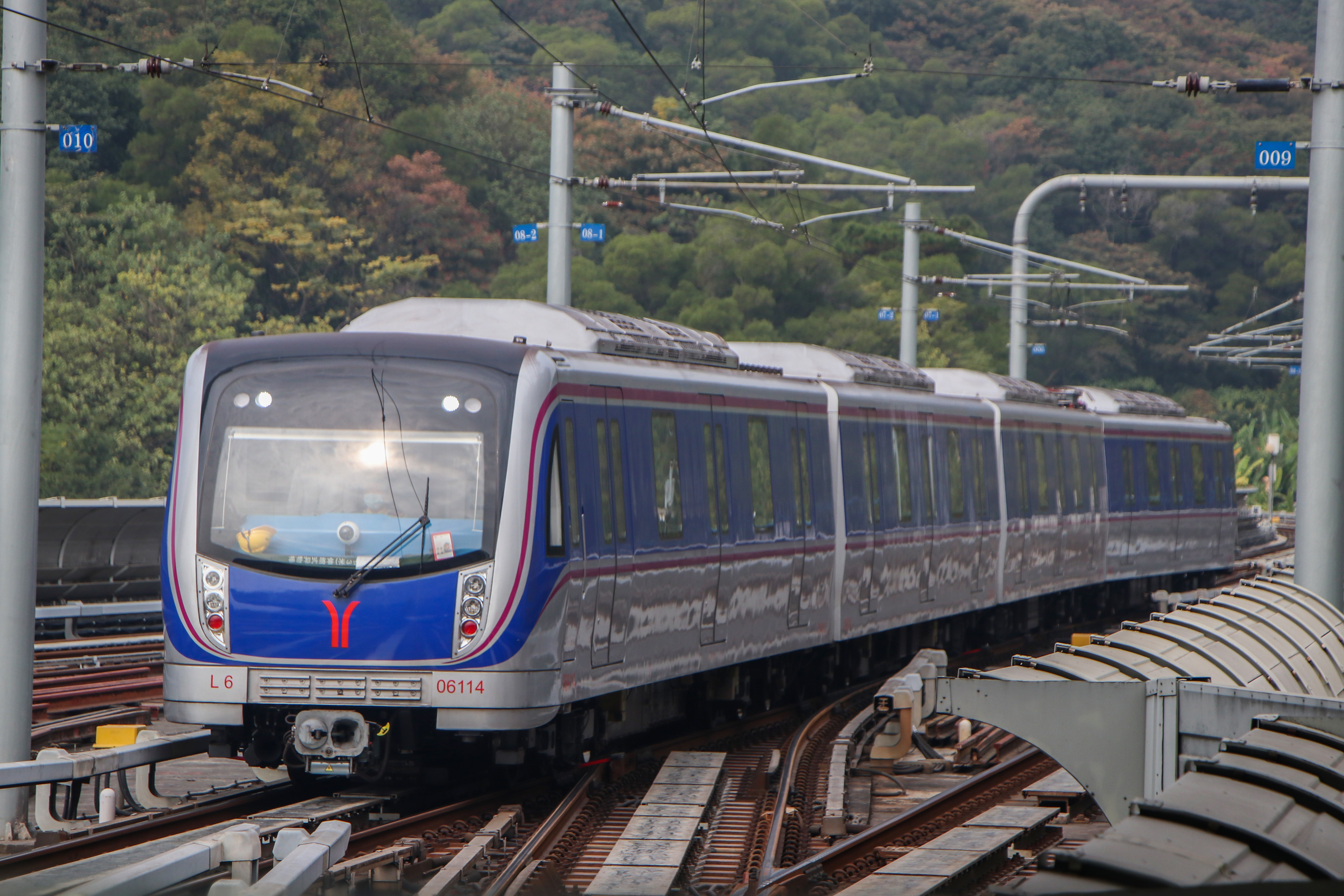
- A Line 6 train

Overview
- Other name(s): M7 (7 lines plan name); M6 (2000 plan name); Luogang line (萝岗线)
- Status: Operational
- Owner: City of Guangzhou
- Locale: Huangpu, Tianhe, Yuexiu, Liwan, and Baiyun districts Guangzhou, Guangdong
- Termini: Xunfenggang; Xiangxue
- Stations: 32

Service
- Type: Rapid transit
- System: Guangzhou Metro
- Services: 2
- Operator: Guangzhou Metro Corporation
- Rolling stock: CRRC Qingdao Sifang/Kawasaki Heavy Industries Metro cars
- Daily ridership: 785,900 (2025 daily average); 1.153 million (2019 Peak)

History
- Opened: December 28, 2013; 12 years ago

Technical
- Line length: 41.7 km (25.9 mi)
- Character: Underground/Elevated (Three stations)
- Track gauge: 1,435 mm (4 ft 8 1/2 in)
- Electrification: Third rails, 1,500 V DC
- Operating speed: 90 km/h (56 mph)

Line 6
- Simplified Chinese: 广州地铁6号线
- Traditional Chinese: 廣州地鐵6號線
Transcriptions
Standard Mandarin
- Hanyu Pinyin: Guǎngzhōu Dìtiě Liù Hào Xiàn
Yue: Cantonese
- Jyutping: gwong^{2}zau^{1} dei^{6}tit^{3} luk^{6} hou^{6} sin^{3}

Line 6 of the Guangzhou Metro runs from Baiyun District to Huangpu District. It starts at Xunfenggang and ends at Xiangxue, interchanging with Line 5 at Tanwei and Ouzhuang; Line 1 at Huangsha and Dongshankou; Line 8 at Cultural Park; Line 2 at Haizhu Square; Line 11 at Shahe; Line 21 at Suyuan; Line 3 at Yantang and Tianhe Coach Terminal, and Line 7 at Luogang. The total length is 41.9 km (26.04 mi) with 32 stations. Line 6 serves densely populated areas including residential communities in Jinshazhou, the pedestrian street in Beijing Lu and wholesale markets in Shahe. Nevertheless, Line 6, which runs four-car trains, has long had a questionable train capacity. The phase one section between Xunfenggang and Changban began to provide service from 28 December 2013 with the exception of Yide Lu and Shahe stations. Yide Lu opened over a year later on 28 January 2015, and Shahe opened on 28 December 2024. The second phase of Line 6 from Changban to Xiangxue has been in operation since 28 December 2016. Like Lines 4 and 5, Line 6 is equipped with linear induction motor technology. Line 6's color is maroon.

== History ==
=== Route ===
What would become Line 6 first appeared in the Guangzhou Fast Rail Transit Network Design Report in 1997. It proposed a Line 7 starting from Sanyanqiao near Jiaokou, running along the north bank of the Pearl River, then turning sharp north for an interchange with Line 1 at Martyrs' Park, then northeast out of the city centre to Gaotangshi.

By 2003, the western end of the plan had been rearranged, with Line 5 now heading to Jiaokou, and Line 6 moved further north to terminate on Jinshazhou Island. The interchange with Line 1 had also been moved one stop down to Dongshankou.

Line 6's Environmental Impact Assessment received approval on 13 July 2006. The route was confirmed in a government announcement in December that year, running 31.3 kilometres (19.4 mi) from Xunfenggang to Gaotangshi with 26 stations in total (identical to the current route). A depot would be constructed on Jinshazhou island, with a stabling yard in Kemulang at the other end of the line (ultimately not constructed). It was expected to be completed in 2010.

A further east extension from Changban to Xiangxue was announced in 2009. By now, the first stage announced in 2006 had been truncated to Changban, with Changban to Gaotangshi now part of the extension. Accordingly, the proposed stabling yard at Kemulang was replaced with one in Luogang district.

=== Construction ===
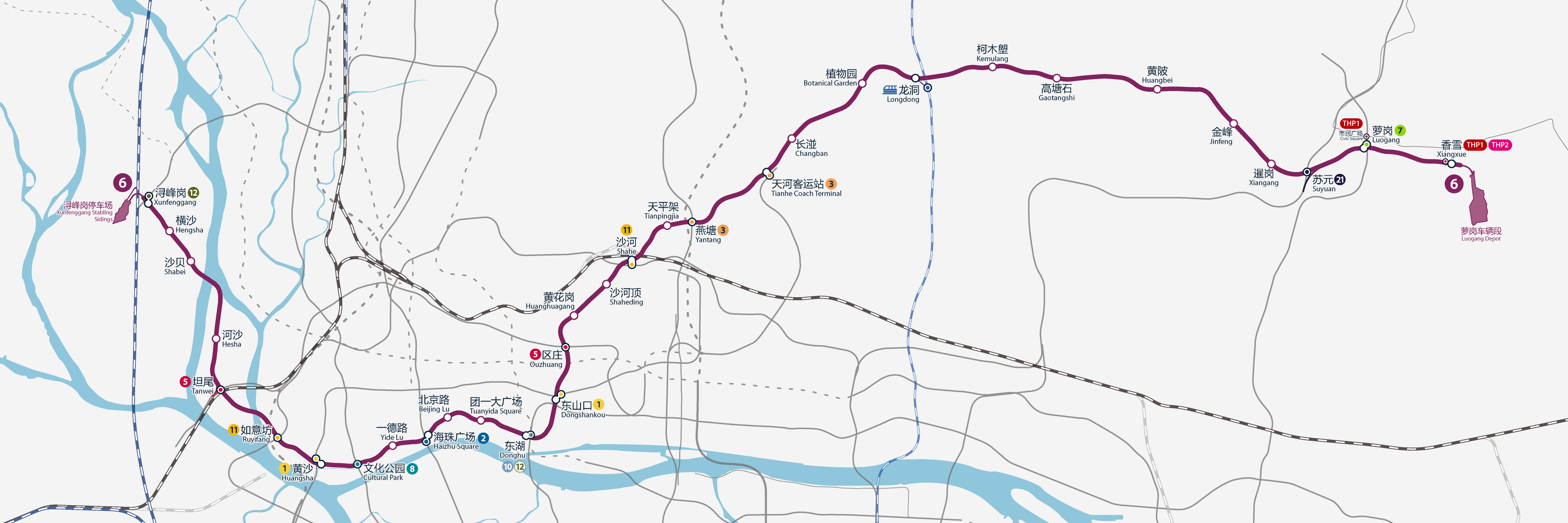
Line 6 drawn to scale.

Huangsha was chosen as an experimental construction site, being the first to start construction on 28 June 2005. The first tunnel section (Huangsha - Haizhu Square) was completed in October 2009, with all tunneling was completed by April 2013. Track laying started in December 2011, being completed in May 2013. Phase 1 was successfully opened on 28 December 2013.

| Segment | Commencement | Length | Station(s) | Name |
|---|---|---|---|---|
| Xunfenggang — Changban | 28 December 2013 | 24.5 km (15.22 mi) | 20 | Phase 1 |
| Yide Lu | 28 January 2015 | Infill station | 1 | |
| Changban — Xiangxue | 28 December 2016 | 17.2 km (10.69 mi) | 8 | Phase 2 |
| Botanical Garden, Kemulang | 28 June 2017 | Infill stations | 2 | |
| Shahe | 28 December 2024 | Infill stations | 1 | |

=== Capacity ===
In 2004, when feasibility studies began for Line 6, it was noted on Line 1, ridership had turned out to be much lower at opening (172-176k passengers per day) compared to estimates during planning (290k/day). As a result, Guangzhou Metro adopted a policy to use shorter trains, with higher service frequency when necessary. As such, it was planned to use smaller, shorter L type trains of 4 cars on Line 6, especially as the line was considered to serve an auxiliary role in the network.

By 2009, overcrowding on Line 3, which had also been designed under the same principle, caused Guangzhou Metro to again consider the capacity of Line 6. It was calculated that an upgrade to 6 car B type trains as used on Line 3 would increase capacity by 50%. However at this time it was found it was no longer feasible to increase train length as construction had already started and so redesign of the stations was no longer possible.

In response, it was instead decided to remove 2 rows of seats in each carriage - increasing capacity by around 80 passengers per carriage. This practice has continued for all new rolling stock orders. A further 4 trains were ordered, bringing the minimum service headway to 3 minutes 22 seconds.

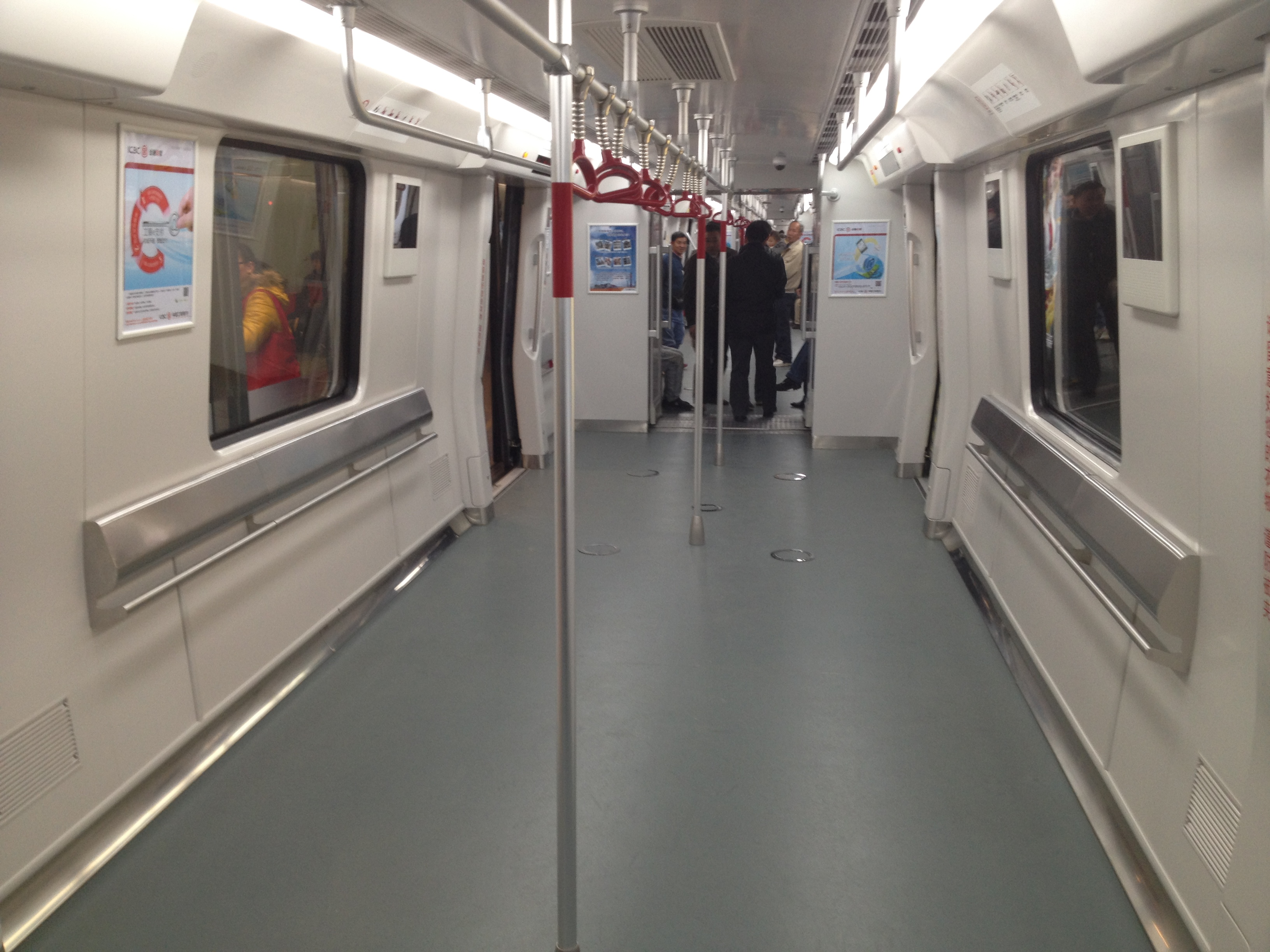
Line 6 car with seats removed.

Even so, overcrowding was experienced as soon as the line opened. The initial ridership was projected to be 428k passengers per day, however it was revealed the line averaged almost 700k/day in its first month. With the opening of Phase II in late 2016 ridership continued to increase, averaging 850,000 passengers per day as of April 2018. Since 2017, daily ridership of Line 6 consistently peaks over 1 million passengers per day during high load periods such as holidays.

Guangzhou Metro has responded to the crowding by decreasing headways and buying supplementary rolling stock to further increase frequencies. Phase II stations east of Botanical Garden Station were redesigned before stating construction to allow for at least 6 car Type L trains to be used. There are various plans to separate this section of Line 6 to be an independent line, allowing for the use of 6 car trains and diverting passenger traffic away from the central Phase I section Line 6.

== Future ==
The Third Phase of Line 6 was originally planned to further extend the line east deeper into Zengcheng, terminating at Guanhu station and connect with the Zengcheng Development Zone Station on the Xinbaiguang intercity railway. The extension would be 19 km (11.81 mi) long with provisions to be spun off into an independent line (Line 23). The spun off line was planned to run between Jingxi Nanfang Hospital and Guanhu stations with the central section reusing the Phase II section of Line 6 between Botanical Garden and Xiangxue Stations making use of provisions made at Botanical Garden Station for interchanging with the rest of Line 6. However in 2018, plans for Line 23 using any section of Line 6 was abandoned and the proposed Phase III east extension of Line 6 was folded permanently into the eastern section of a new Line 23 plan that is completely independent of Line 6. The western section of this new independent Line 23 will no longer be using any Phase II trackage of Line 6, instead heading southwest to Chisha station in Haizhu District. The new Line 6 Phase III extension plan will instead be a short 4 km (2.49 mi) two station extension to Liucun.

In 2019, another proposal to spin off the eastern section of Line 6 east of Botanical Garden Station. This time the new line will take over the eastern section beyond Botanical Garden Station and head south to Canton Tower station. This new line is tentatively named Line 20.

== Stations ==
| Service routes | | Station No. | Station name | | Connections | Future Connections | Distance km | | Location |
| Service routes | | Station No. | English | Chinese | Connections | Future Connections | Distance km | | Location |
|---|---|---|---|---|---|---|---|---|---|
| ● | ● | 601 | Xunfenggang | 浔峰岗 | 12 1201 | | 0.00 | 0.00 | Baiyun |
| ● | ● | 602 | Hengsha | 横沙 | | | 0.87 | 0.87 | Baiyun |
| ● | ● | 603 | Shabei | 沙贝 | | | 0.81 | 1.68 | Baiyun |
| ● | ● | 604 | Hesha | 河沙 | | | 2.21 | 1.89 | Liwan |
| ● | ● | 605 | Tanwei | 坦尾 | 5 502 | | 1.09 | 2.98 | Liwan |
| ● | ● | 606 | Ruyifang | 如意坊 | 11 1118 | | 1.86 | 4.84 | Liwan |
| ● | ● | 607 | Huangsha | 黄沙 | 1 105 | | 1.19 | 6.03 | Liwan |
| ● | ● | 608 | Cultural Park | 文化公园 | 8 814 | | 0.85 | 6.88 | Liwan |
| ● | ● | 609 | Yide Lu | 一德路 | | | 0.95 | 7.83 | Yuexiu |
| ● | ● | 610 | Haizhu Square | 海珠广场 | 2 212 | | 0.95 | 8.78 | Yuexiu |
| ● | ● | 611 | Beijing Lu | 北京路 | | | 0.56 | 9.34 | Yuexiu |
| ● | ● | 612 | Tuanyida Square | 团一大广场 | | | 0.83 | 10.17 | Yuexiu |
| ● | ● | 613 | Donghu | 东湖 | 10 1010 | 12 1216 | 1.15 | 11.32 | Yuexiu |
| ● | ● | 614 | Dongshankou | 东山口 | 1 112 | | 1.36 | 12.68 | Yuexiu |
| ● | ● | 615 | Ouzhuang | 区庄 | 5 509 | | 1.10 | 13.78 | Yuexiu |
| ● | ● | 616 | Huanghuagang | 黄花岗 | | | 1.07 | 14.85 | Yuexiu |
| ● | ● | 617 | Shaheding | 沙河顶 | | | 0.97 | 15.82 | Tianhe |
| ● | ● | 618 | Shahe | 沙河 | 11 1109 | | 1.03 | 16.85 | Tianhe |
| ● | ● | 619 | Tianpingjia | 天平架 | | | 1.10 | 17.95 | Tianhe |
| ● | ● | 620 | Yantang | 燕塘 | 3 319 | | 0.64 | 18.59 | Tianhe |
| ● | ● | 621 | Tianhe Coach Terminal | 天河客运站 | 3 316 (Operated by Line 10 in the future) | 10 | 2.21 | 20.80 | Tianhe |
| ● | ● | 622 | Changban | 长湴 | | | 0.99 | 21.79 | Tianhe |
| ● | | 623 | Botanical Garden | 植物园 | | | 1.89 | 23.68 | Tianhe |
| ● | | 624 | Longdong | 龙洞 | ER | | 1.74 | 25.42 | Tianhe |
| ● | | 625 | Kemulang | 柯木塱 | | | 1.94 | 27.36 | Tianhe |
| ● | | 626 | Gaotangshi | 高塘石 | | | 1.52 | 28.88 | Tianhe |
| ● | | 627 | Huangbei | 黄陂 | | | 2.42 | 31.30 | Huangpu |
| ● | | 628 | Jinfeng | 金峰 | | | 2.20 | 33.50 | Huangpu |
| ● | | 629 | Xiangang | 暹岗 | | | 1.30 | 34.80 | Huangpu |
| ● | | 630 | Suyuan | 苏元 | 21 2109 | | 0.93 | 35.73 | Huangpu |
| ● | | 631 | Luogang | 萝岗 | 7 718; Civic Square: THP1 THP104 | | 1.53 | 37.26 | Huangpu |
| ● | | 632 | Xiangxue | 香雪 | THP1 THP101 THP2 THP201 | | 2.09 | 39.35 | Huangpu |

== Rolling stock ==
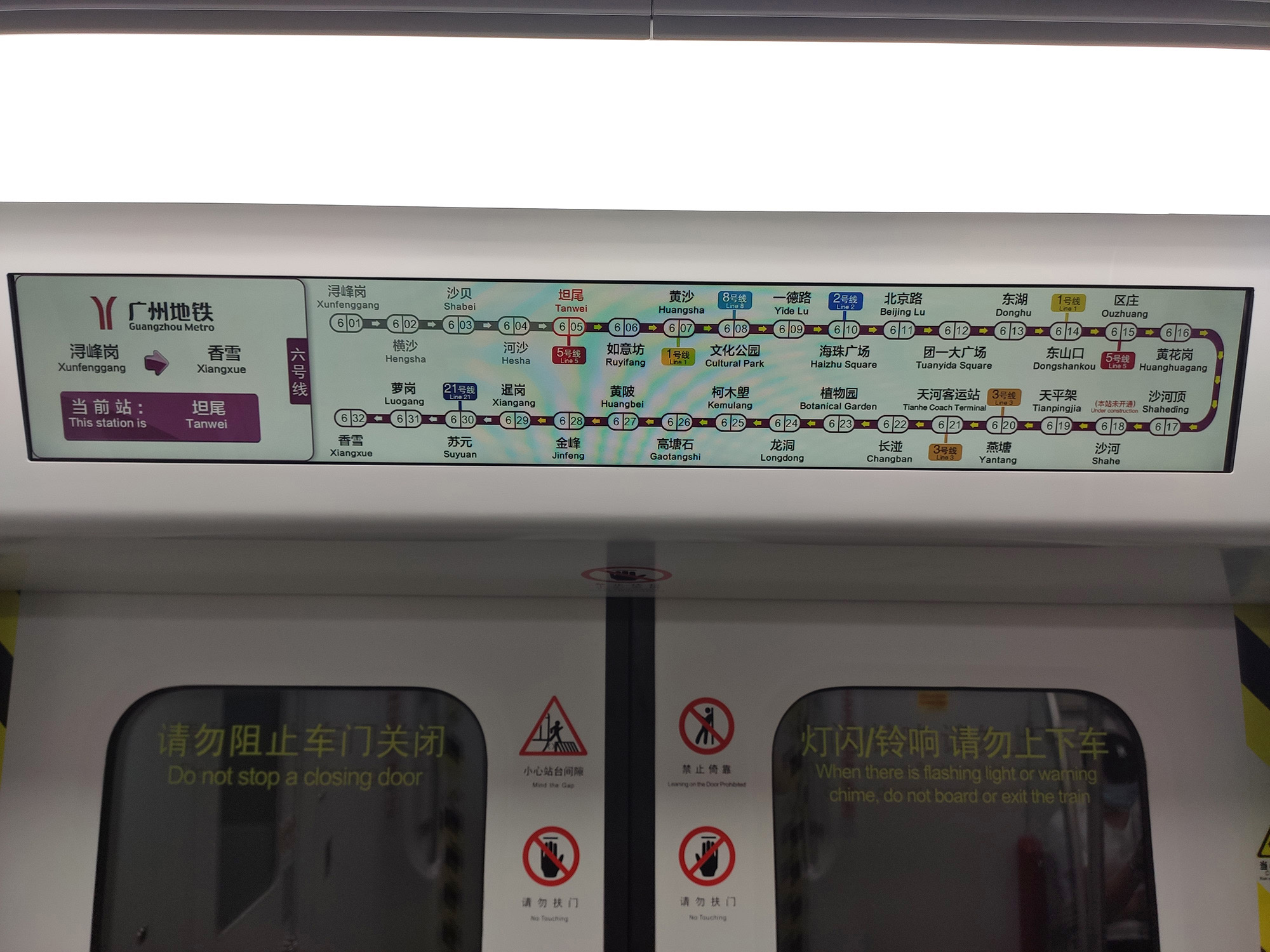
Line 6 train interior LCD

As of September 2021, Line 6 is served by 89 sets of four car linear motor trains.

| Type | Time of manufacturing | Series | Sets | Assembly | Notes |
|---|---|---|---|---|---|
| Type L | 2011–2012 | L3 | 40 | Mc+Mp+Mp+Mc | First batch by CRRC Qingdao Sifang |
| Type L | 2015–2016 | L3 | 11 | Mc+Mp+Mp+Mc | Second batch by CRRC Qingdao Sifang |
| Type L | 2019–2021 | L6 | 38 | Mcp+M+M+Mcp | Manufactured by CRRC Guangdong |
