= Meihuayuan station =

Guangzhou Metro station

Coordinates: 23.1752°N 113.3202°E

Meihuayuan 梅花园

Chinese name
- Simplified Chinese: 梅花园站
- Traditional Chinese: 梅花園站
- Literal meaning: Plum Blossom Garden station
Transcriptions
Standard Mandarin
- Hanyu Pinyin: Méihuāyuán Zhàn
Yue: Cantonese
- Yale Romanization: Mùihfāyùhn Jaahm
- Jyutping: Mui^{4}faa^{1}jyun^{4} Zaam^{6}
- Hong Kong Romanization: Mui Fa Yuen station

General information
- Location: Baiyun District, Guangzhou, Guangdong; China
- Operator: Guangzhou Metro Co. Ltd.
- Line: Line 3
- Platforms: 2 (1 island platform)

Construction
- Structure type: Underground

Other information
- Station code: 320

History
- Opened: 30 October 2010; 16 years ago

Services
| Preceding station | Guangzhou Metro | Following station |
|---|---|---|
| Yantang towards Haibang | Line 3 | Jingxi Nanfang Hospital towards Airport North (Terminal 2) |
Location

Meihuayuan Station (simplified Chinese: 梅花园站; traditional Chinese: 梅花園站; Cantonese Yale: Mùihfāyùhn Jaahm; lit. 'Plum Blossom Garden Station') is a metro station on Line 3 of the Guangzhou Metro. The underground station is located on the Meihuayuan Section of Guangzhou Avenue North (广州大道北) in the Baiyun District of Guangzhou. It started operation on 30 October 2010.

== Station layout ==
| G | - | Exit |
| L1; Concourse | Lobby | Customer Service, Shops, Vending machines, ATMs, Flight information |
| L2; Equipment Area | - | Station equipment |
| L3; Platforms | Platform 1 | 3 towards Haibang (Yantang) |
| L3; Platforms | Island Platform, doors will open on the left |
| L3; Platforms | Platform 2 | 3 towards Airport North (Jingxi Nanfang Hospital) |

== Exits ==
| Exit number | Exit location |
|---|---|
| Exit B | Guangzhou Dadaobei |
| Exit D | Guangzhou Dadaobei |
