= Huanghuagang station =

Guangzhou Metro station

Coordinates: 23.14017°N 113.29877°E

Huanghuagang 黄花岗
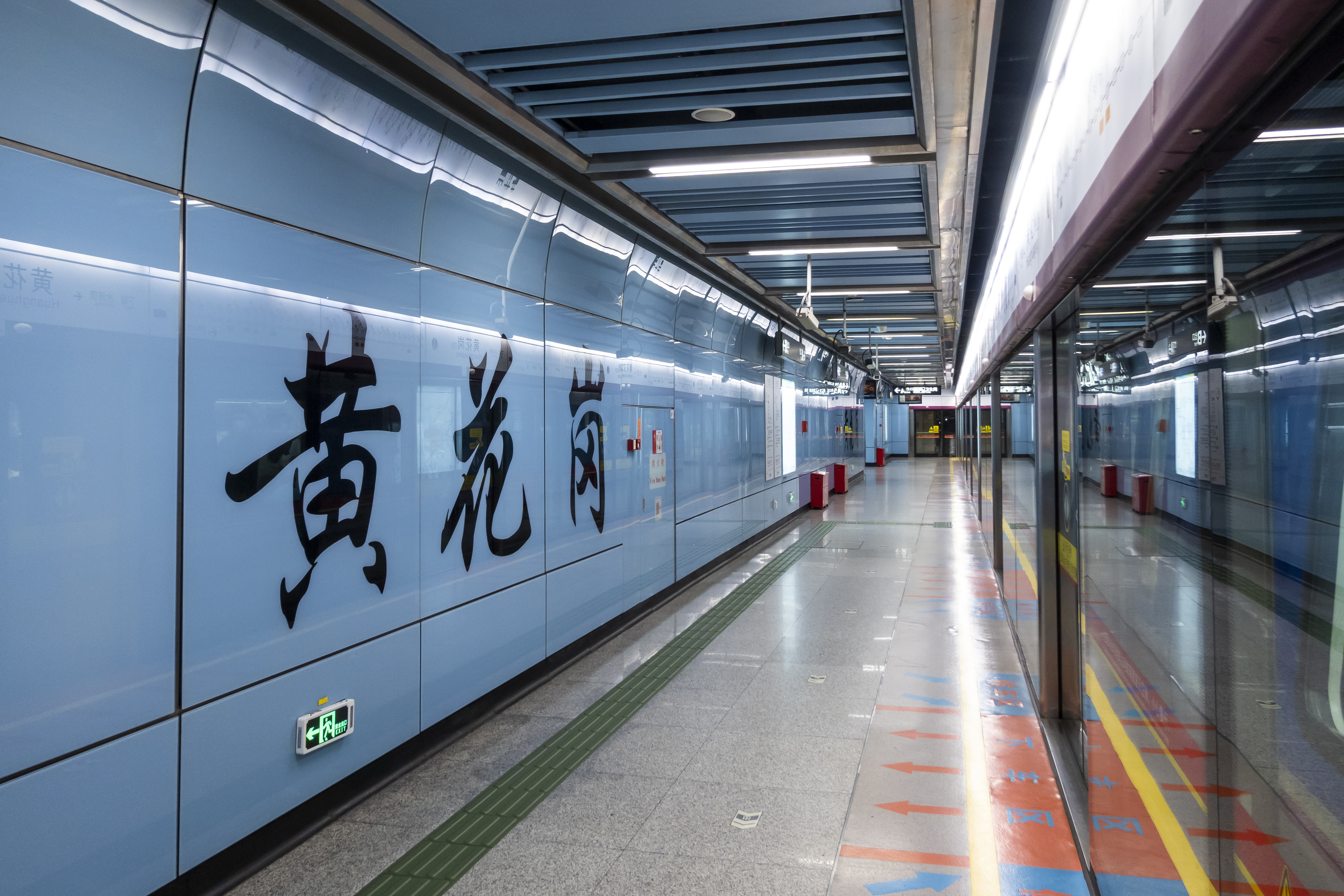
- Station platform

Chinese name
- Simplified Chinese: 黄花岗站
- Traditional Chinese: 黃花崗站
Transcriptions
Standard Mandarin
- Hanyu Pinyin: Huánghuāgǎng Zhàn
Yue: Cantonese
- Jyutping: wong^{4}faa^{1}gong^{1} zaam^{6}
- Hong Kong Romanization: Wong Fa Kong station

General information
- Location: Middle Lieshi Road (先烈中路) north of the intersection with East Keyuan Road (科苑东路); Yuexiu District, Guangzhou, Guangdong; China
- Operated by: Guangzhou Metro Co. Ltd.
- Line: Line 6
- Platforms: 2 (1 island platform)

Construction
- Structure type: Underground

Other information
- Station code: 616

History
- Opened: 28 December 2013; 12 years ago

Services
Preceding station	Guangzhou Metro	Following station
Ouzhuang towards Xunfenggang	Line 6	Shaheding towards Xiangxue
Location

Huanghuagang Station (Chinese: 黄花岗站) is a station on Guangzhou Metro Line 6 located under the Yuexiu District of Guangzhou. It started operation on 28 December 2013.

== Station layout ==
G Concourse	North Lobby	Exit A, Customer Service, Vending machines, ATMs
G Concourse	South Lobby	Exit B, Customer Service, Vending machines, ATMs
L1; Buffer Area	-	Buffer area between Lobbies and Platforms
L2; Buffer & Equipment Area	North Buffer Area	Buffer area between North Lobby and Platforms, Station equipment
L2; Buffer & Equipment Area	South Buffer Area	Buffer area between North Lobby and Platforms, Toilet, Station equipment
L3; Platforms	Platform 2	6 towards Xunfenggang (Ouzhuang)
L3; Platforms	Side platform, doors will open on the left
L3; Platforms	Pedestrian Passageway	Passage linking platforms
L3; Platforms	Side platform, doors will open on the left
L3; Platforms	Platform 1	6 towards Xiangxue (Shaheding)

== Exits ==
Exit number	Exit location
Exit A	Xianlie Zhonglu
Exit B	Xianlie Zhonglu
