= Shaheding station =

Guangzhou Metro station

Shaheding 沙河顶
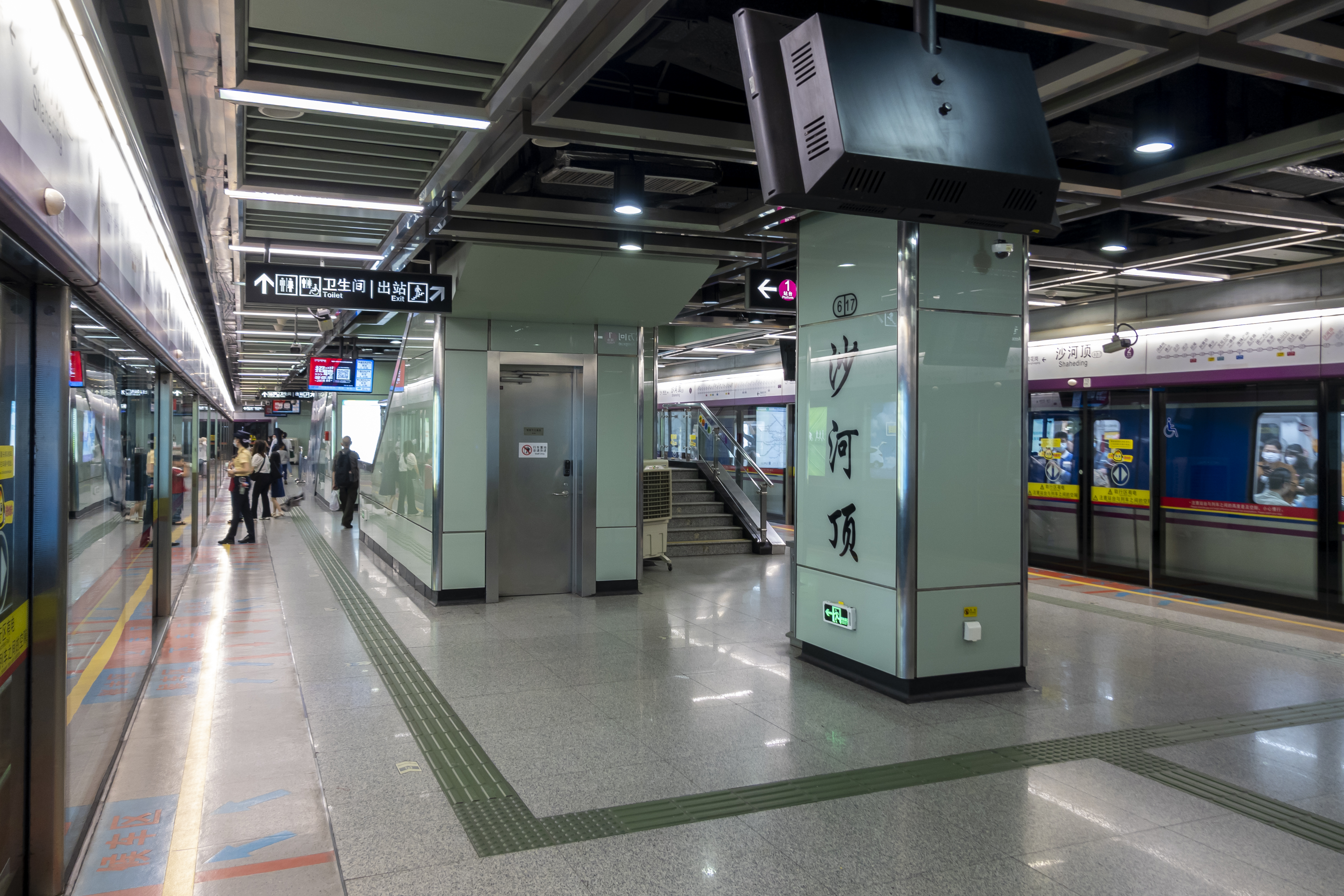
- Platform

Chinese name
- Simplified Chinese: 沙河顶站
- Traditional Chinese: 沙河頂站
Transcriptions
Standard Mandarin
- Hanyu Pinyin: Shāhédǐng Zhàn
Yue: Cantonese
- Jyutping: saa^{1}ho^{4}ding^{2} zaam^{6}

General information
- Location: Xianlie East Road (先烈东路) and Shuiyin Road (水荫路); Tianhe District, Guangzhou, Guangdong; China
- Coordinates: 23°08′50″N 113°18′25″E
- Operated by: Guangzhou Metro Co. Ltd.
- Line: Line 6
- Platforms: 2 (1 island platform)
- Tracks: 2

Construction
- Structure type: Underground
- Accessible: Yes

Other information
- Station code: 617

History
- Opened: 28 December 2013; 12 years ago

Services
Preceding station	Guangzhou Metro	Following station
Huanghuagang towards Xunfenggang	Line 6	Shahe towards Xiangxue
Location

Shaheding Station (Chinese: 沙河顶站) is a station of Guangzhou Metro Line 6. It is located underground in Tianhe District. It started operation on 28 December 2013.

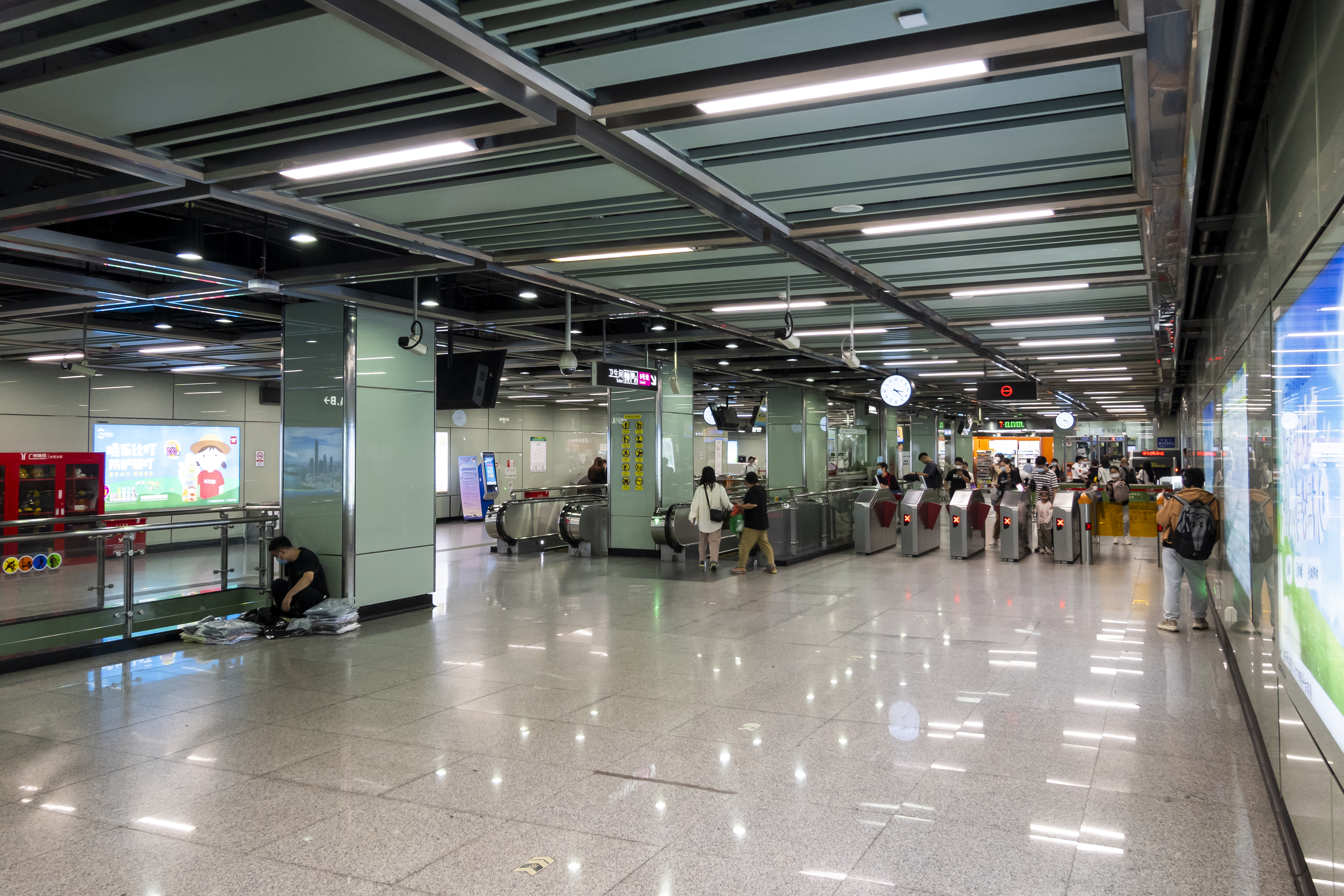
Concourse

== Station layout ==
G	-	Exits A & B
L1; Concourse	Lobby	Ticket Machines, Customer Service, Shops, Police Station, Safety Facilities
L2; Platforms	Platform 2	6 towards Xunfenggang (Huanghuagang)
L2; Platforms	Island platform, doors will open on the left
L2; Platforms	Platform 1	6 towards Xiangxue (Shahe)

=== Entrances/exits ===
The station has 2 points of entry/exit, with Exit A being accessible via stairlift.

- A: Xianlie East Road, Shuiyin Road, Guangzhou 19th Route Army Songhu Anti-Japanese Fallen Soldiers Cemetery, Guangzhou No.16 Middle School Shuiyin Campus
- B: Xianlie East Road, Party School of the Guangzhou Municipal Committee of the Chinese Communist Party, Xinghai Conservatory of Music
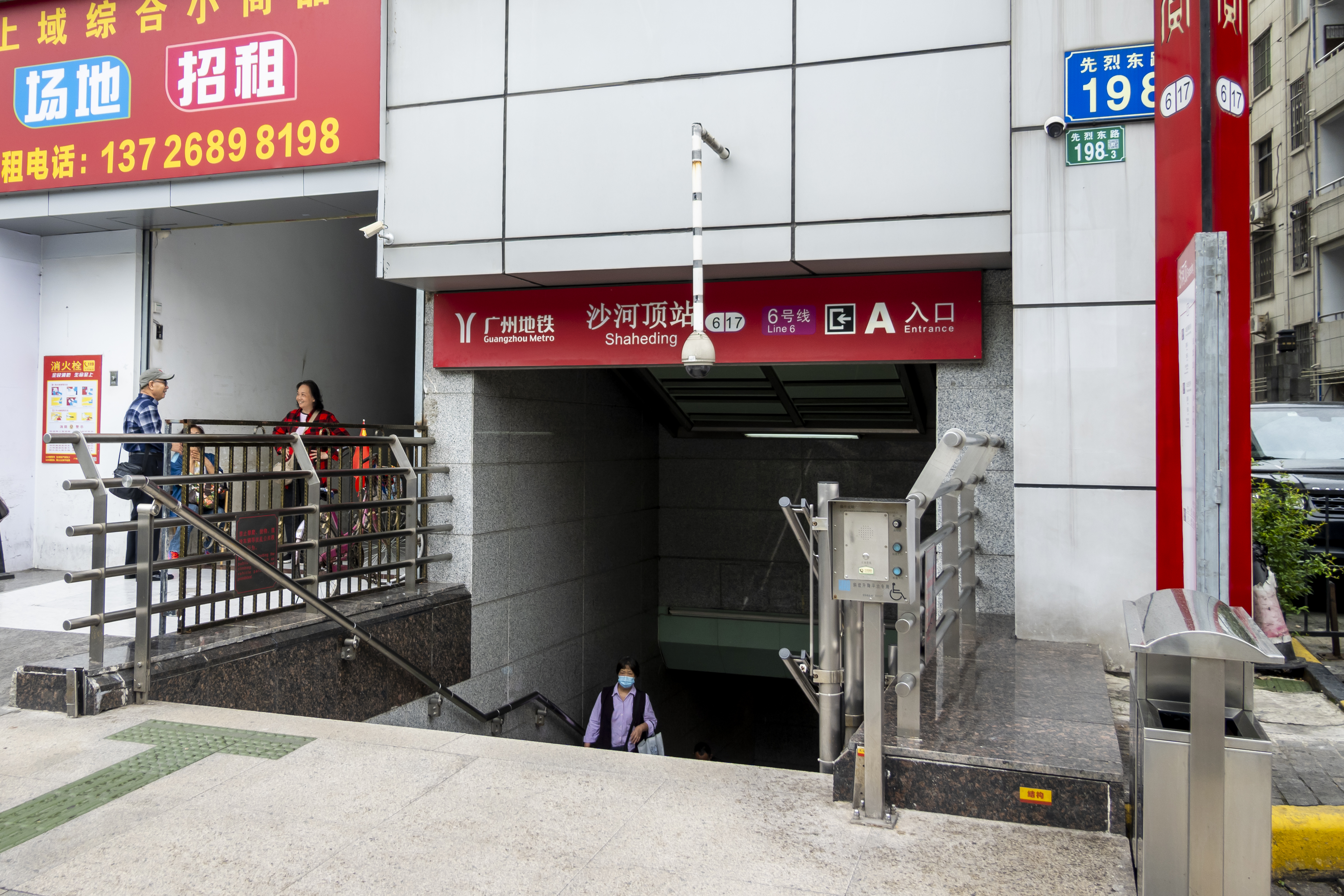
Entrance A

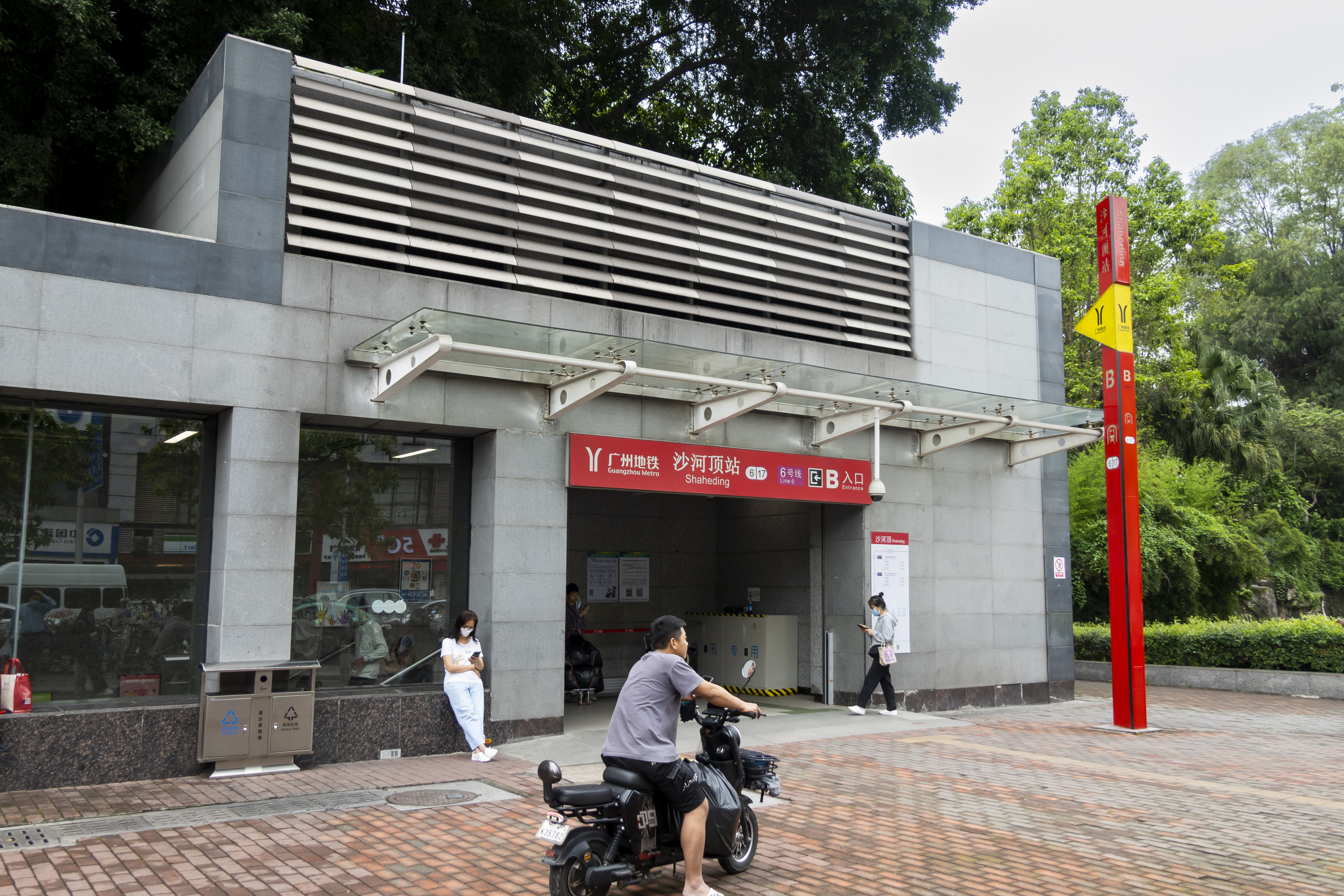
Entrance B

== History ==
The station was originally named Shuiyin Road station at the beginning of Line 6 planning, and was later officially named Shaheding.

Due to the impact of the site environment and the demolition of Guangdong University of Technology, the station plan has been adjusted twice. On 22 October 2010, the main structure of the station was topped out. On 26 December 2012, the section between this station and Huanghuagang Station was bored through.

On 28 December 2013, the station was put into use with the opening of Line 6 trial operation.
