= Fenghuang Xincun station =

Guangzhou Metro station

Fenghuang Xincun 凤凰新村
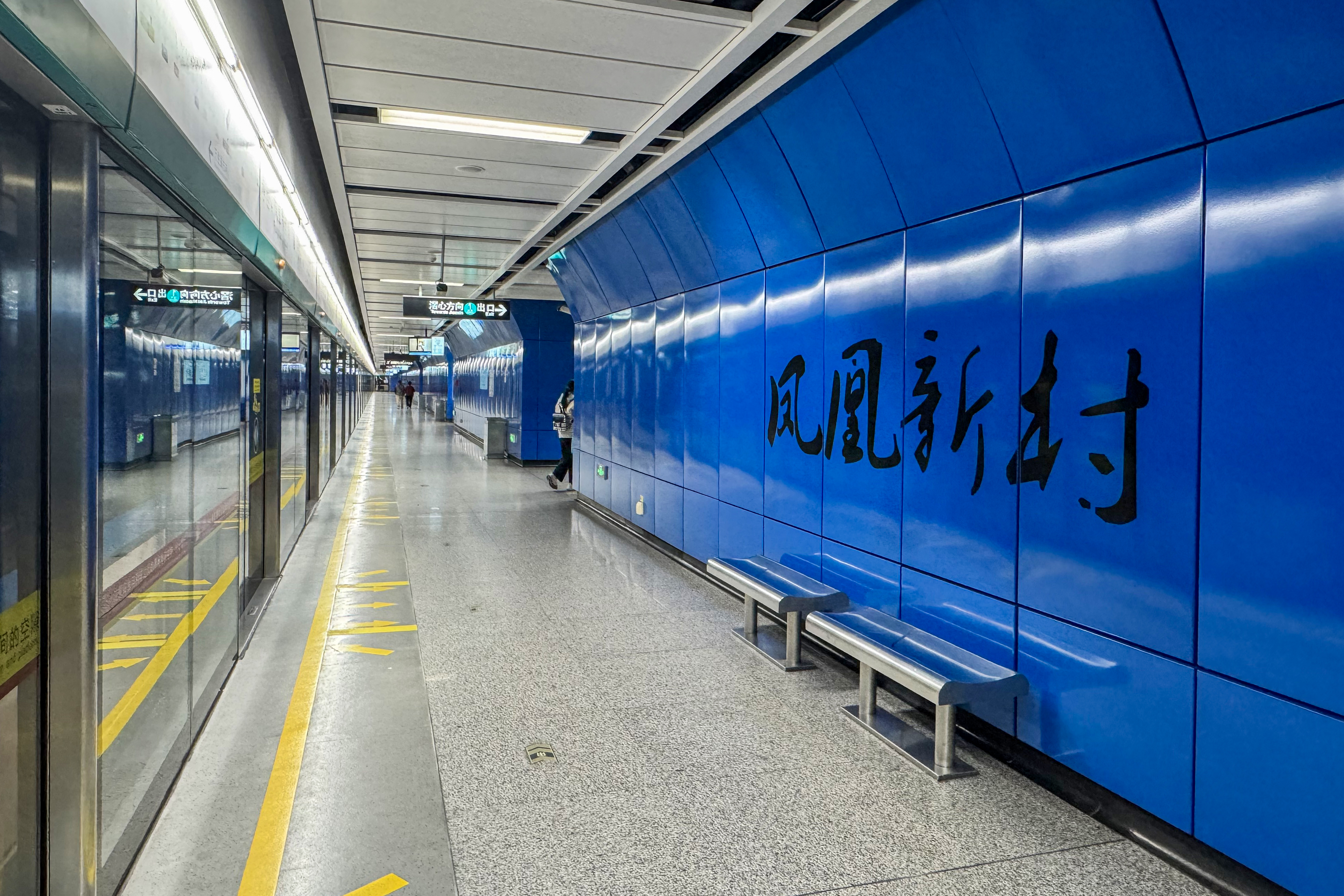
- Platform 2

Chinese name
- Simplified Chinese: 凤凰新村站
- Traditional Chinese: 鳳凰新村站
- Literal meaning: Fenghuang New Village Station
Transcriptions
Standard Mandarin
- Hanyu Pinyin: Fènghuáng Xīncūn Zhàn
Yue: Cantonese
- Jyutping: fung^{6}wong^{4} san^{1}cyun^{1} zaam^{6}

General information
- Location: Gongye Avenue North (工业大道北) and Nantian Road (南田路); Haizhu District, Guangzhou, Guangdong; China
- Coordinates: 23°05′51″N 113°15′02″E
- Operated by: Guangzhou Metro Co. Ltd.
- Line: Line 8
- Platforms: 2 (1 island platform)

Construction
- Structure type: Underground

Other information
- Station code: 816

History
- Opened: 3 November 2010; 15 years ago

Services
Preceding station	Guangzhou Metro	Following station
Tongfuxi towards Jiaoxin	Line 8	Shayuan towards Wanshengwei
Location

Fenghuang Xincun Station (Chinese: 凤凰新村站) is a station on Line 8 of the Guangzhou Metro. The underground station is located on Gongye Avenue North (工业大道北) in the Haizhu District. The station opened on November 3, 2010 after a delay caused by the cooling tower at Shayuan Station. It was the terminus of the line until December 28, 2019 when the line was extended to Cultural Park station.

== Station layout ==
G	-	Exits
L1; Concourse	Lobby	Customer Service, Shops, Vending machines, ATMs
L2; Equipment Area	-	Station equipment
L3; Platforms	Platform 1	8 towards Jiaoxin (Tongfuxi)
L3; Platforms	Island platform, doors will open on the left
L3; Platforms	Platform 2	8 towards Wanshengwei (Shayuan)

=== Entrances/exits ===
The station has 3 points of entry/exit. Exit D was opened on 9 January 2026.

- A: Nantian Road
- B: Gongye Avenue North
- D: Meiyuan West Road (梅园西路)

Exit A is accessible via stairlift.

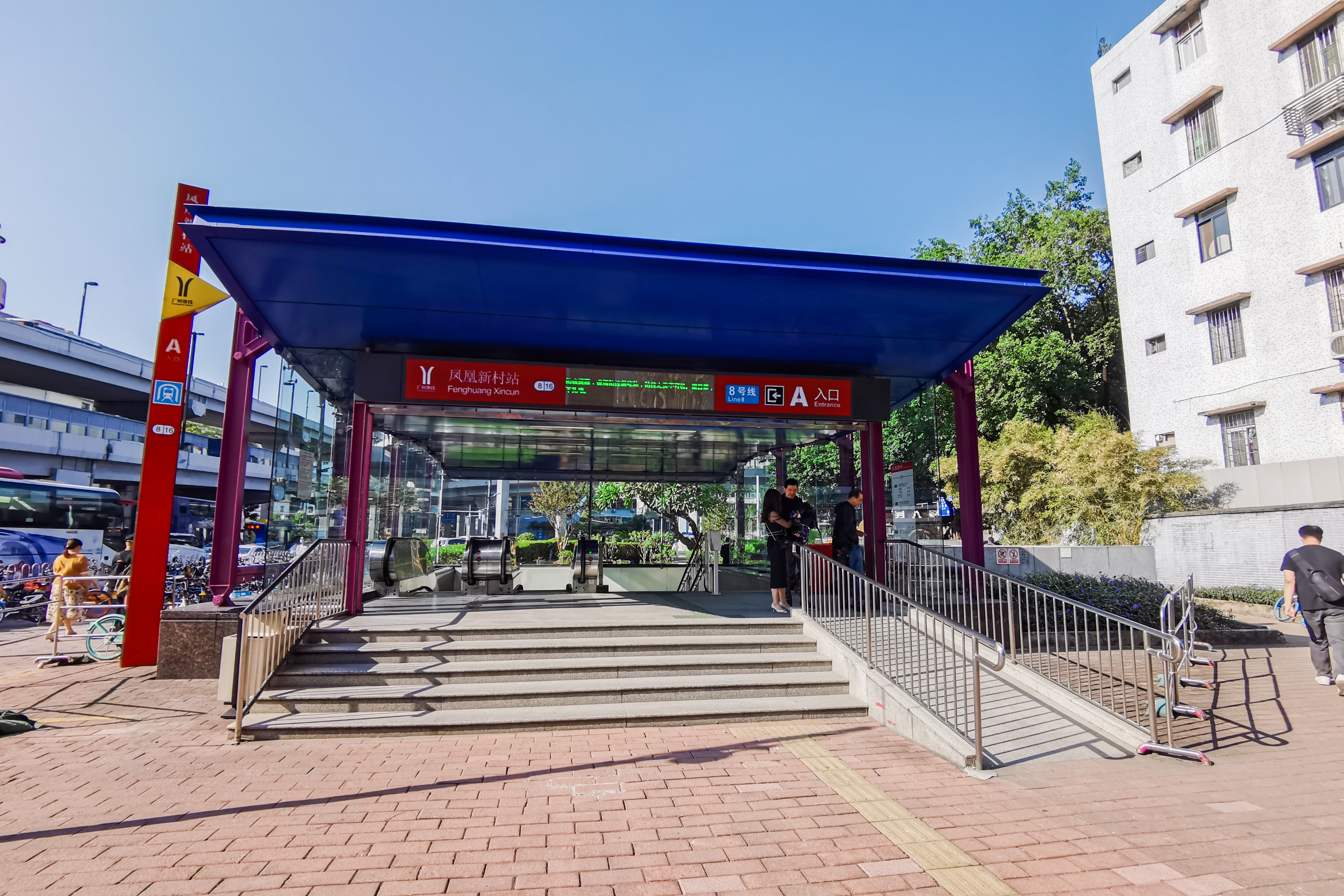
Exit A

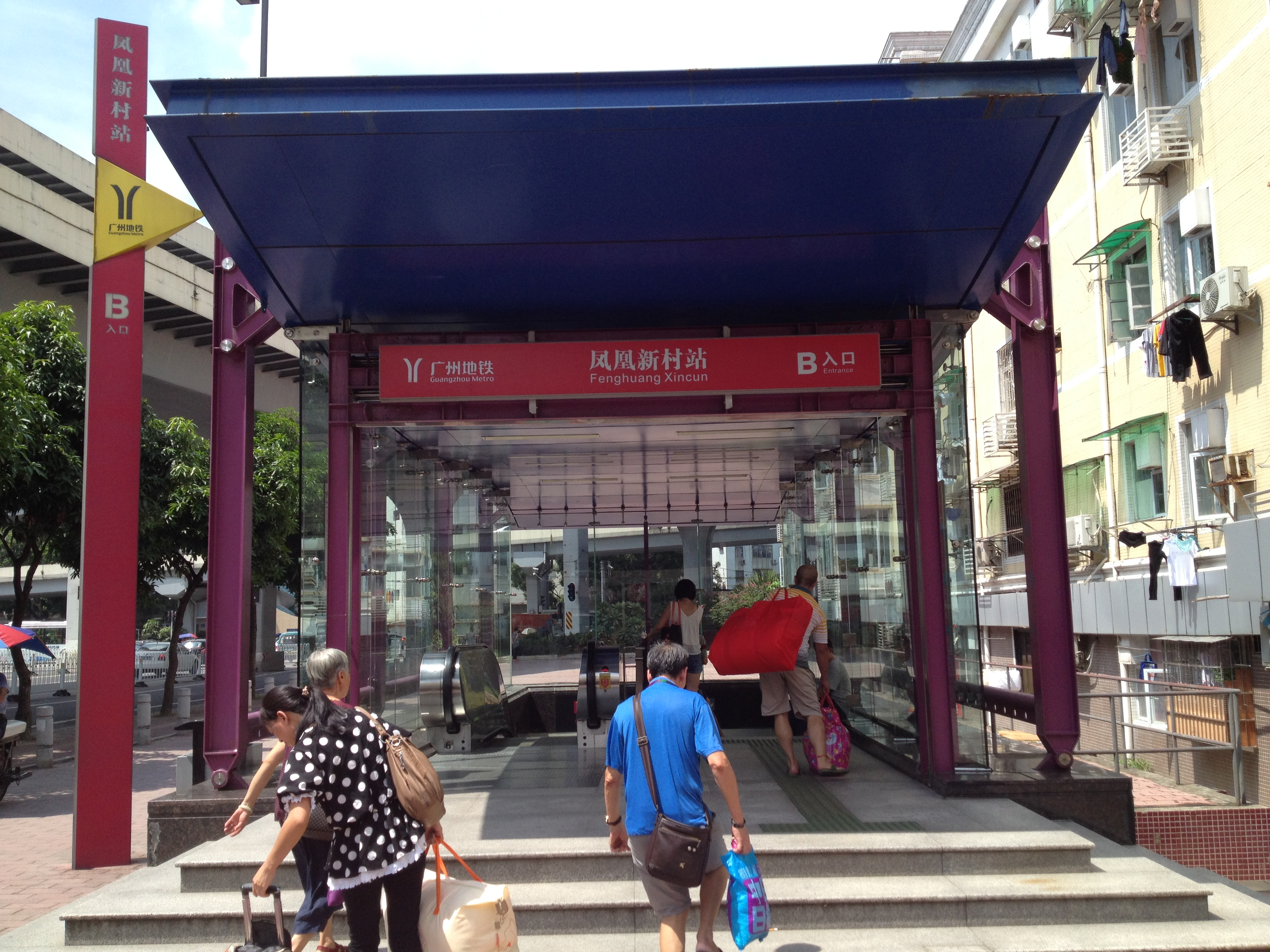
Exit B

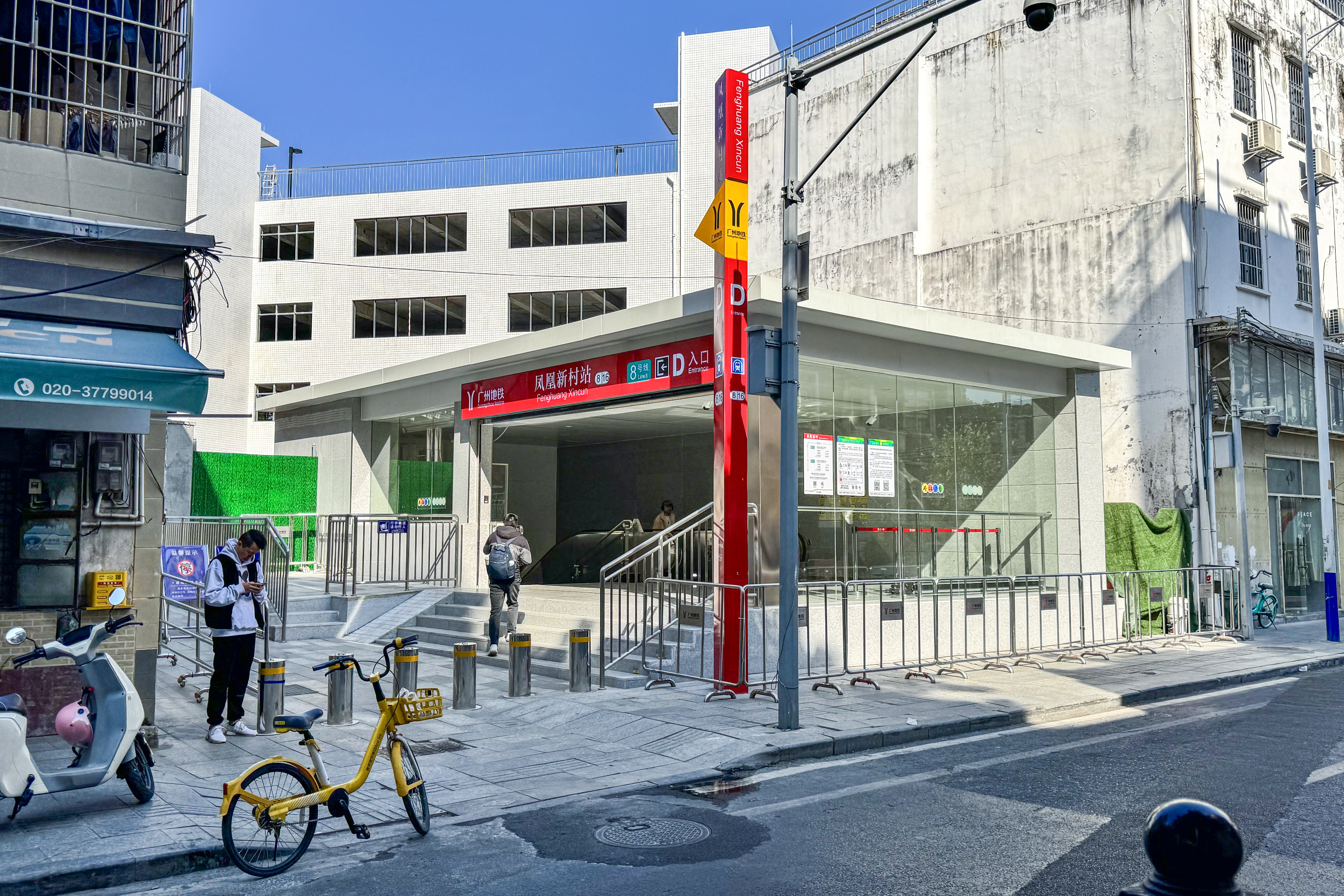
Exit D

== Gallery ==
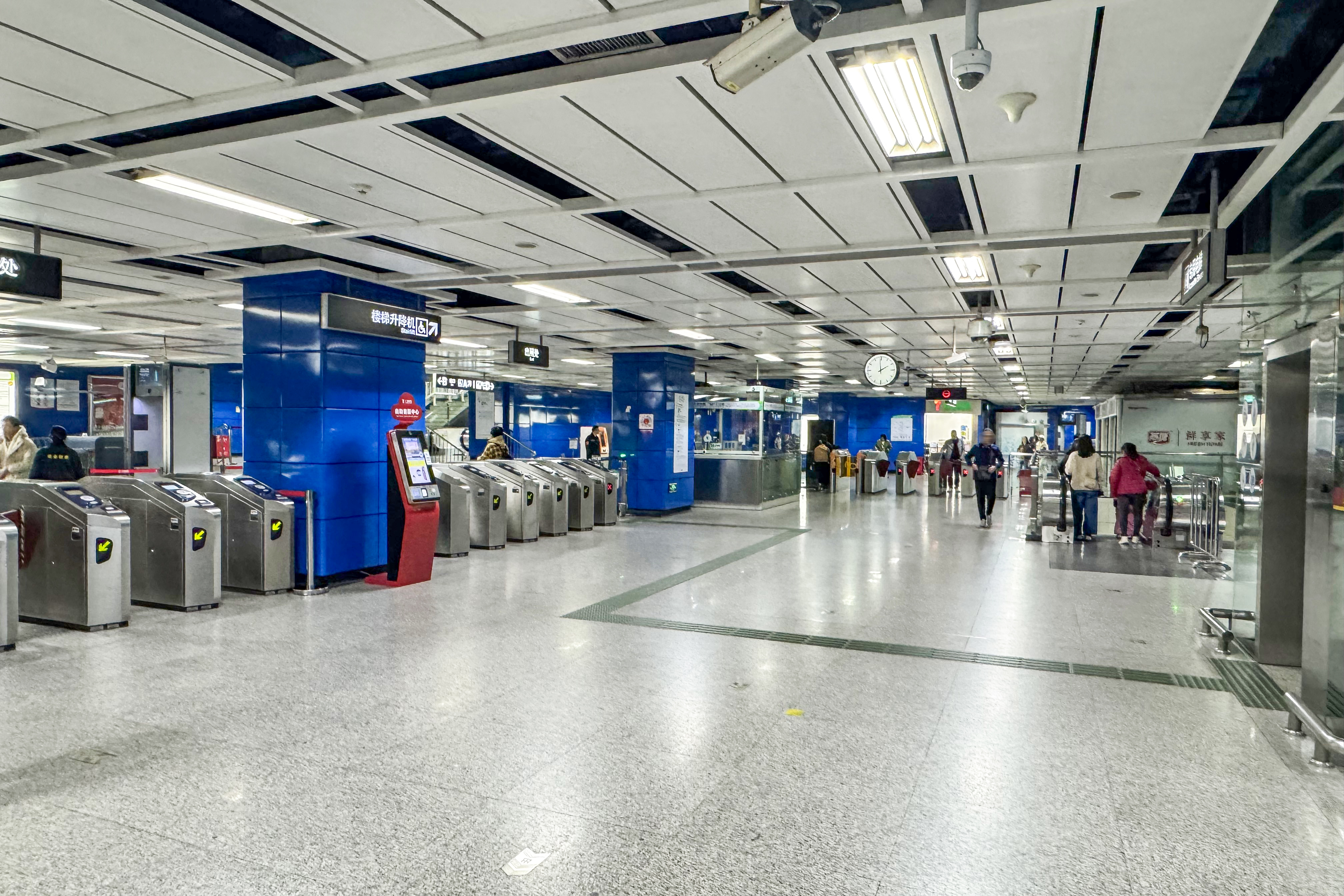
Concourse
