= The 2nd Workers' Cultural Palace station =

Guangzhou Metro station

Coordinates: 23.106006°N 113.269877°E

The 2nd Workers' Cultural Palace 市二宫
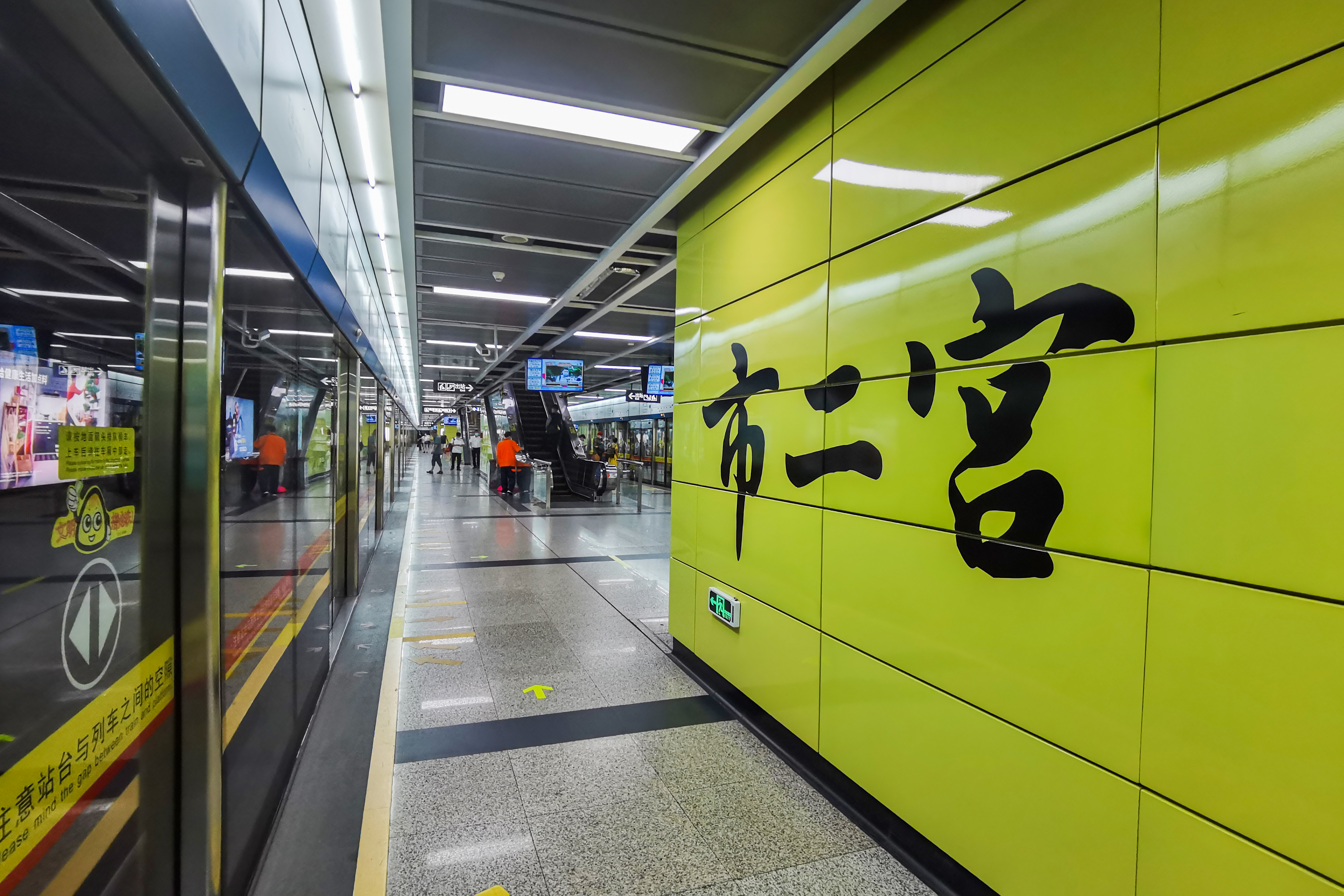

Chinese name
- Simplified Chinese: 市二宫站
- Traditional Chinese: 市二宮站
Transcriptions
Standard Mandarin
- Hanyu Pinyin: Shì'èrgōng Zhàn
Yue: Cantonese
- Yale Romanization: Síhyihgūng Jaahm
- Jyutping: Si5ji6gung1 Zaam6

General information
- Location: Haizhu District, Guangzhou, Guangdong; China
- Operated by: Guangzhou Metro Co. Ltd.
- Line: Line 2
- Platforms: 2 (1 island platform)

Construction
- Structure type: Underground

Other information
- Station code: 211

History
- Opened: 29 December 2002; 23 years ago

Services
Preceding station	Guangzhou Metro	Following station
Jiangnanxi towards Guangzhou South Railway Station	Line 2	Haizhu Square towards Jiahewanggang
Location

The 2nd Workers' Cultural Palace Station or Shi'ergong Station (Chinese: 市二宫站; Jyutping: si5 ji6 gung1 zaam6; Cantonese Yale: Síhyihgūng Jaahm) is a station on Line 2 of the Guangzhou Metro. It is situated underground at the junction of Jiangnan Avenue (江南大道) and Tongfu Road (同福路) in the Haizhu District and began operation on 29 December 2002. The streets of the local area are noted for selling wedding dresses.
