= Haizhu Square station =

Guangzhou Metro interchange station

Haizhu Square 海珠广场
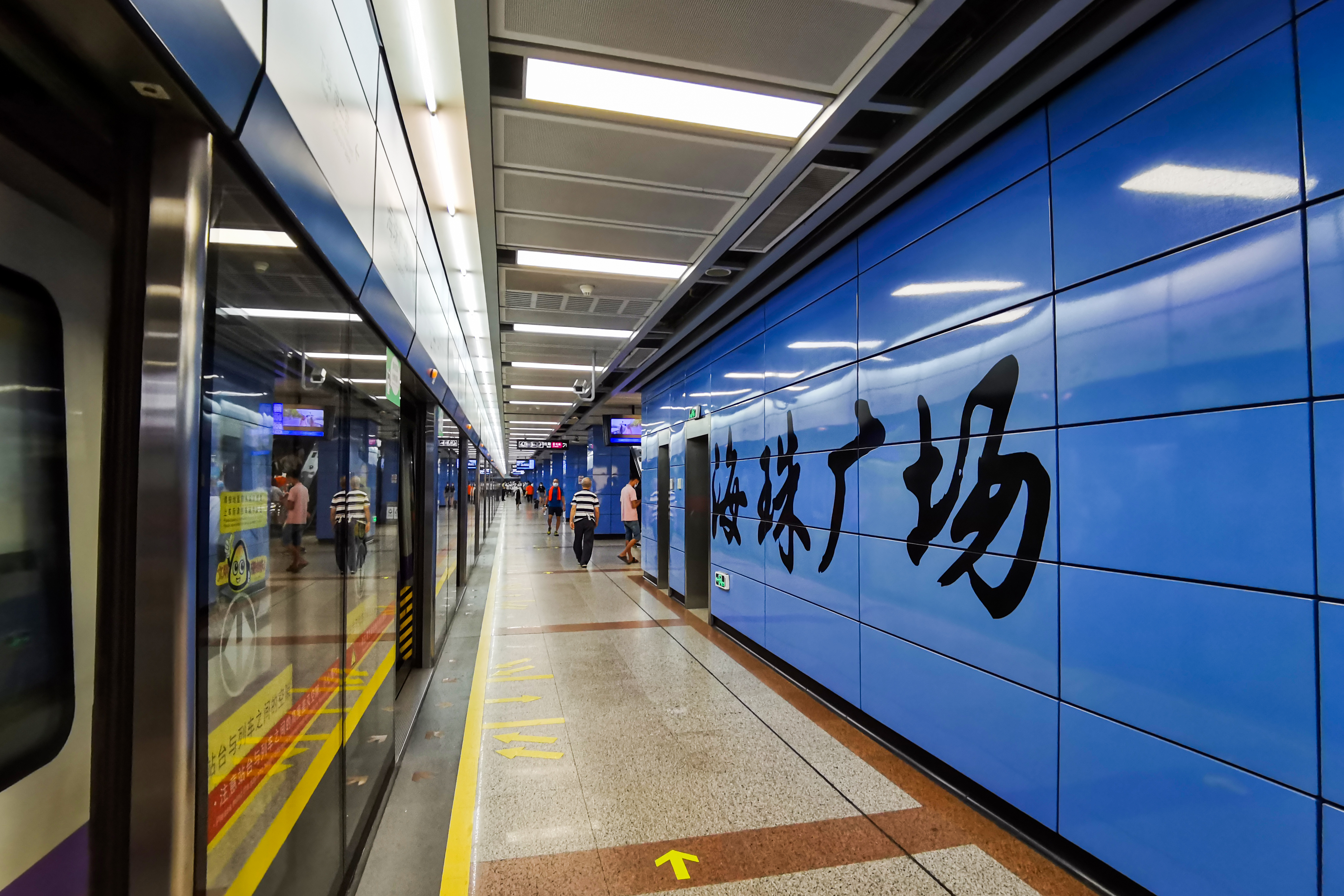
- Platform 2 (Line 2 towards Guangzhou South Railway Station)

Chinese name
- Simplified Chinese: 海珠广场站
- Traditional Chinese: 海珠廣場站
Transcriptions
Standard Mandarin
- Hanyu Pinyin: Hǎizhū Guǎngchǎng Zhàn
Yue: Cantonese
- Yale Romanization: Hóijyū Gwóngchèuhng Jaahm
- Jyutping: Hoi2zyu1 Gwong2coeng4 Zaam6
- Hong Kong Romanization: Hoi Chue Square station

General information
- Location: Yuexiu District, Guangzhou, Guangdong; China
- Coordinates: 23.114796°N 113.265344°E
- Operator: Guangzhou Metro Co. Ltd.
- Lines: Line 2; Line 6
- Platforms: 4 (2 island platforms)
- Tracks: 4

Construction
- Structure type: Underground
- Accessible: Yes

Other information
- Station code: 212 610

History
- Opened: 29 December 2002; 23 years ago (Line 2); 28 December 2013; 12 years ago (Line 6)

Services
| Preceding station | Guangzhou Metro | Following station |
|---|---|---|
| The 2nd Workers' Cultural Palace towards Guangzhou South Railway Station | Line 2 | Gongyuanqian towards Jiahewanggang |
| Yide Lu towards Xunfenggang | Line 6 | Beijing Lu towards Xiangxue |
Location

Haizhu Square Station (simplified Chinese: 海珠广场站; traditional Chinese: 海珠廣場站; Jyutping: hoi2 zyu1 gwong2 coeng4 zaam6; Cantonese Yale: Hóijyū Gwóngchèuhng Jaahm) is an interchange station between Line 2 and Line 6 of the Guangzhou Metro. It started operations on 29 December 2002. It is situated underneath Guangzhou Qiyi Road, Yide Road and Taikang Road in Yuexiu District. It is near Haizhu Square, Guangzhou Hotel (广州酒店) and Hotel Canton Landmark (华夏大酒店).

== Station layout ==
| B1; Concourse | Line 2 Lobby | Ticket Machines, Customer Service, Shops, Police Station, Baby Change, Safety Facilities, Exits A, B1, B2, B3, D |
| B1; Concourse | Transfer Passageway | Transfer passageway between Lines 2 & 6 |
| B1; Concourse | Line 6 Lobby | Ticket Machines, Customer Service, Shops, Police Station, Safety Facilities, Toilets, Exits E and F |
| B2; Equipment Area | - | Station Equipment |
| B3; Equipment Area | - | Station Equipment |
| B3; Equipment Area | Buffer Area | Buffer area of Line 6 |
| B4; Line 2 Platforms | Platform 2 | 2 towards Guangzhou South Railway Station (The 2nd Workers' Cultural Palace) |
| B4; Line 2 Platforms | Island platform, doors will open on the left |
| B4; Line 2 Platforms | Platform 1 | 2 towards Jiahewanggang (Gongyuanqian) |
| B4; Line 2 Platforms | Transfer Passageway | Transfer passageway between Lines 2 & 6 |
| B5; Line 6 Platforms | Platform 4 | 6 towards Xunfenggang (Yide Lu) |
| B5; Line 6 Platforms | Side platform, doors will open on the left |
| B5; Line 6 Platforms | Pedestrian Passageway | Passage linking Line 8 platforms |
| B5; Line 6 Platforms | Side platform, doors will open on the left |
| B5; Line 6 Platforms | Platform 3 | 6 towards Xiangxue (Beijing Lu) |

== Exits ==
The station has 7 exits, lettered A, B (B1 to B3) and D to F.

== Gallery ==
Line 2 concourse

Line 6 concourse

Line 6 culture wall

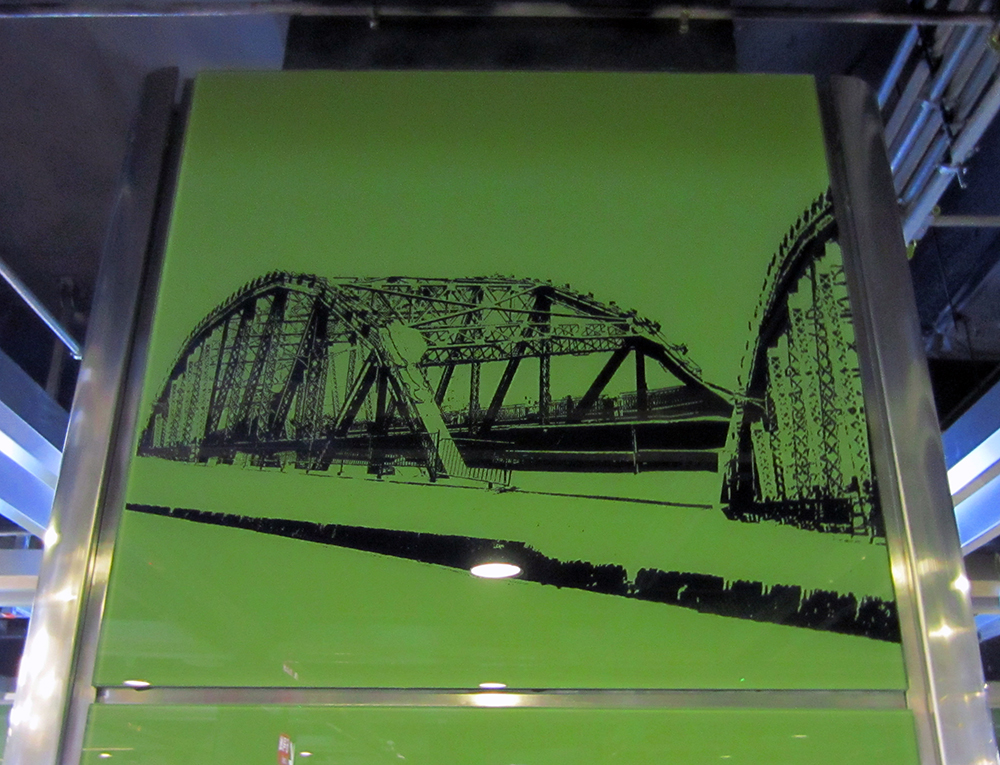
Line 6 wall decoration

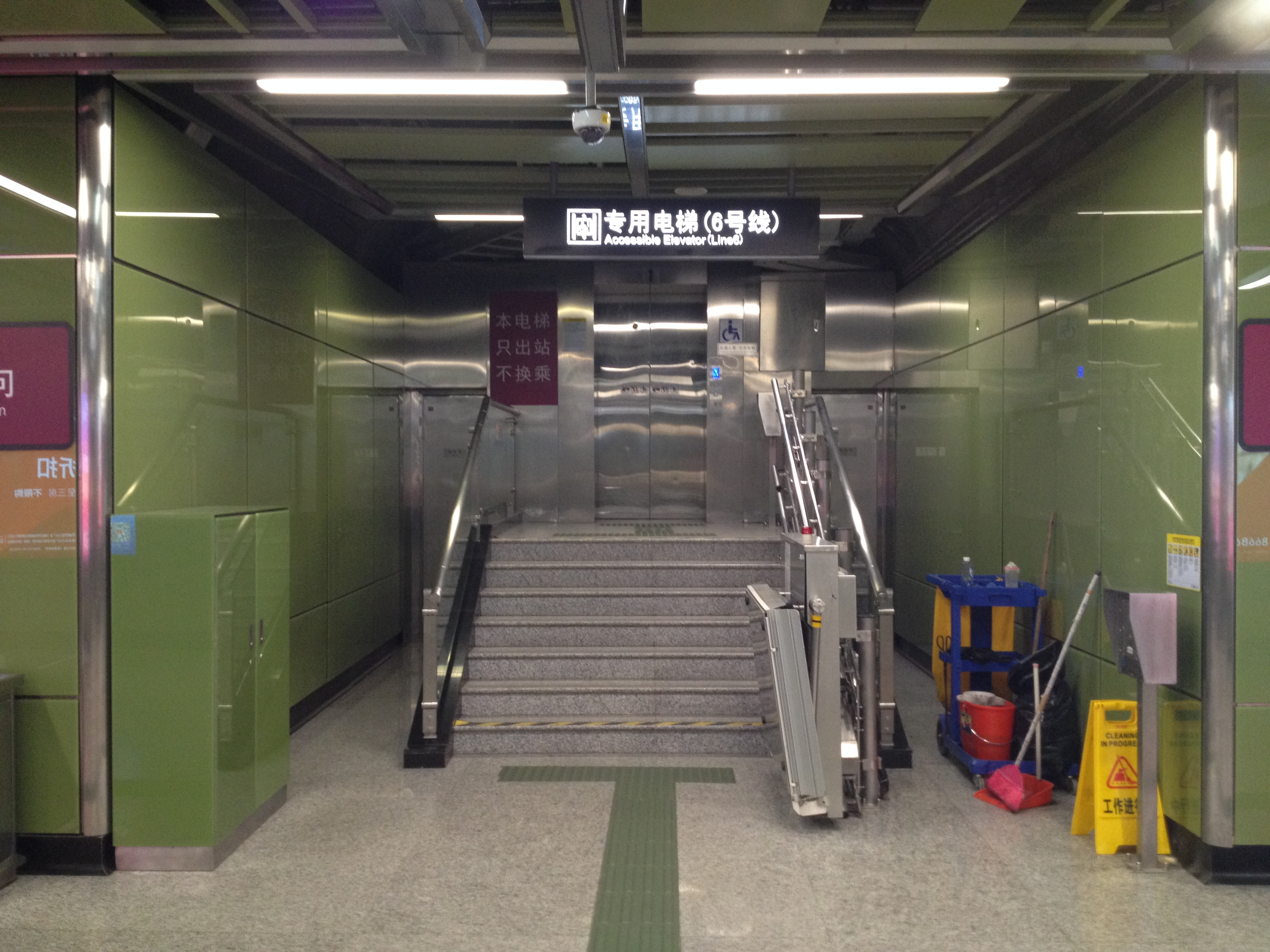
Line 6 elevator

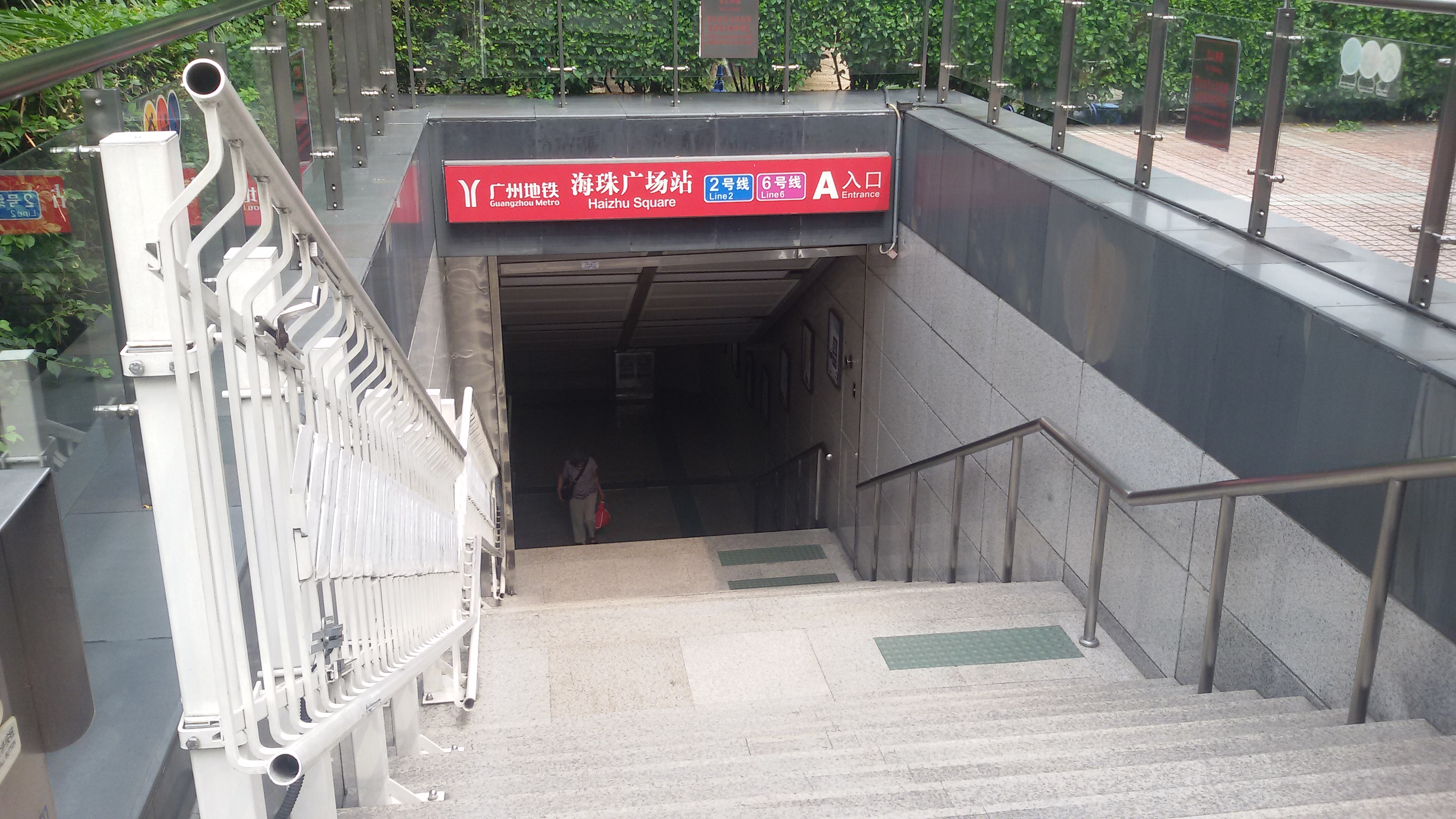
Exit A

Exit F
