= Shayuan station =

Guangzhou Metro interchange station

Coordinates: 23.088625°N 113.260584°E

Shayuan 沙园
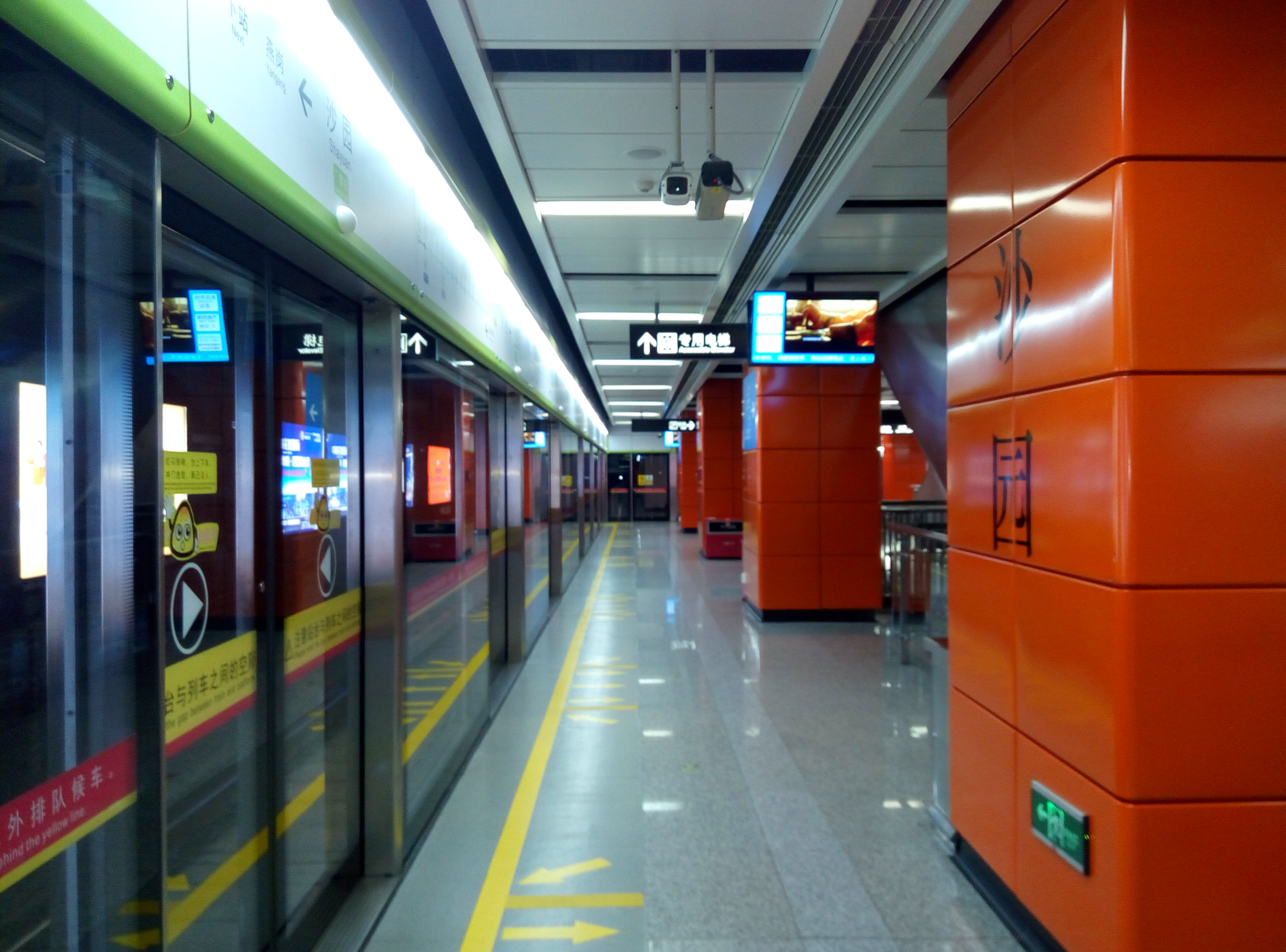
- Platform 3 (Guangfo line towards Lijiao)

Chinese name
- Simplified Chinese: 沙园站
- Traditional Chinese: 沙園站
Transcriptions
Standard Mandarin
- Hanyu Pinyin: Shāyuán Zhàn
Yue: Cantonese
- Jyutping: Saa^{1}jyun^{4} Zaam^{6}

General information
- Location: Rongjing Road and Gongye Avenue North; Haizhu District, Guangzhou, Guangdong; China
- Operator: Guangzhou Metro Co. Ltd.
- Lines: Line 8; Guangfo line
- Platforms: 4 (2 island platforms)
- Tracks: 4

Construction
- Structure type: Underground
- Accessible: Yes

Other information
- Station code: 817 GF21

History
- Opened: 3 November 2010; 15 years ago (Line 8); 28 December 2015; 10 years ago (Guangfo line)

Services
Preceding station	Guangzhou Metro	Following station
Fenghuang Xincun towards Jiaoxin	Line 8	Baogang Dadao towards Wanshengwei
Shachong towards Xincheng Dong	Guangfo line	Yangang towards Lijiao
Location

Shayuan station (Chinese: 沙园站) is an interchange station between Line 8 of the Guangzhou Metro and the Guangfo Line. It is located at the underground of the junction of Rongjing Road and Gongye Avenue North in Haizhu District. It was put into service on 3 November 2010. The Guangfo Line service has entered operations on 28 December 2015.

== Station layout ==
G	-	Exits A-D
L1 Concourse	-	Ticket Machines, Customer Service, Shops, Police Station, Safety Facilities
L2 Platforms	Platform 1	8 towards Jiaoxin (Fenghuang Xincun)
L2 Platforms	Island platform, doors will open on the left
L2 Platforms	Platform 3	Guangfo towards Lijiao (Yangang)
L3 Platforms	Platform 2	8 towards Wanshengwei (Baogang Dadao)
L3 Platforms	Island platform, doors will open on the right
L3 Platforms	Platform 4	Guangfo towards Xincheng Dong (Shachong)

== Exits ==
Exit number	Exit location
Exit A	Gongye Dadaobei
Exit B	Gongye Dadaobei
Exit C	Gongye Dadaobei
Exit D	Gongye Dadaobei

== Gallery ==
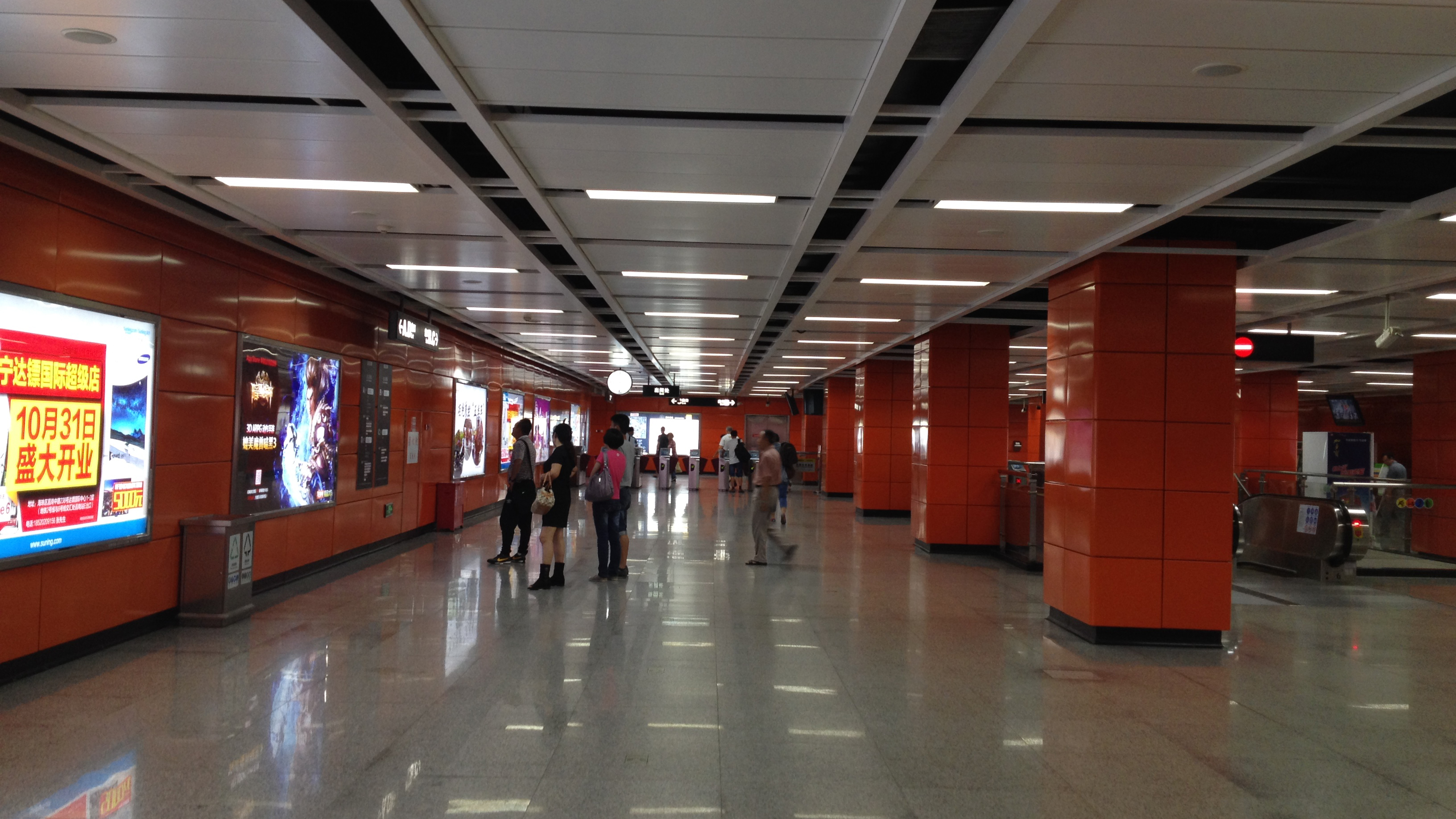
Concourse

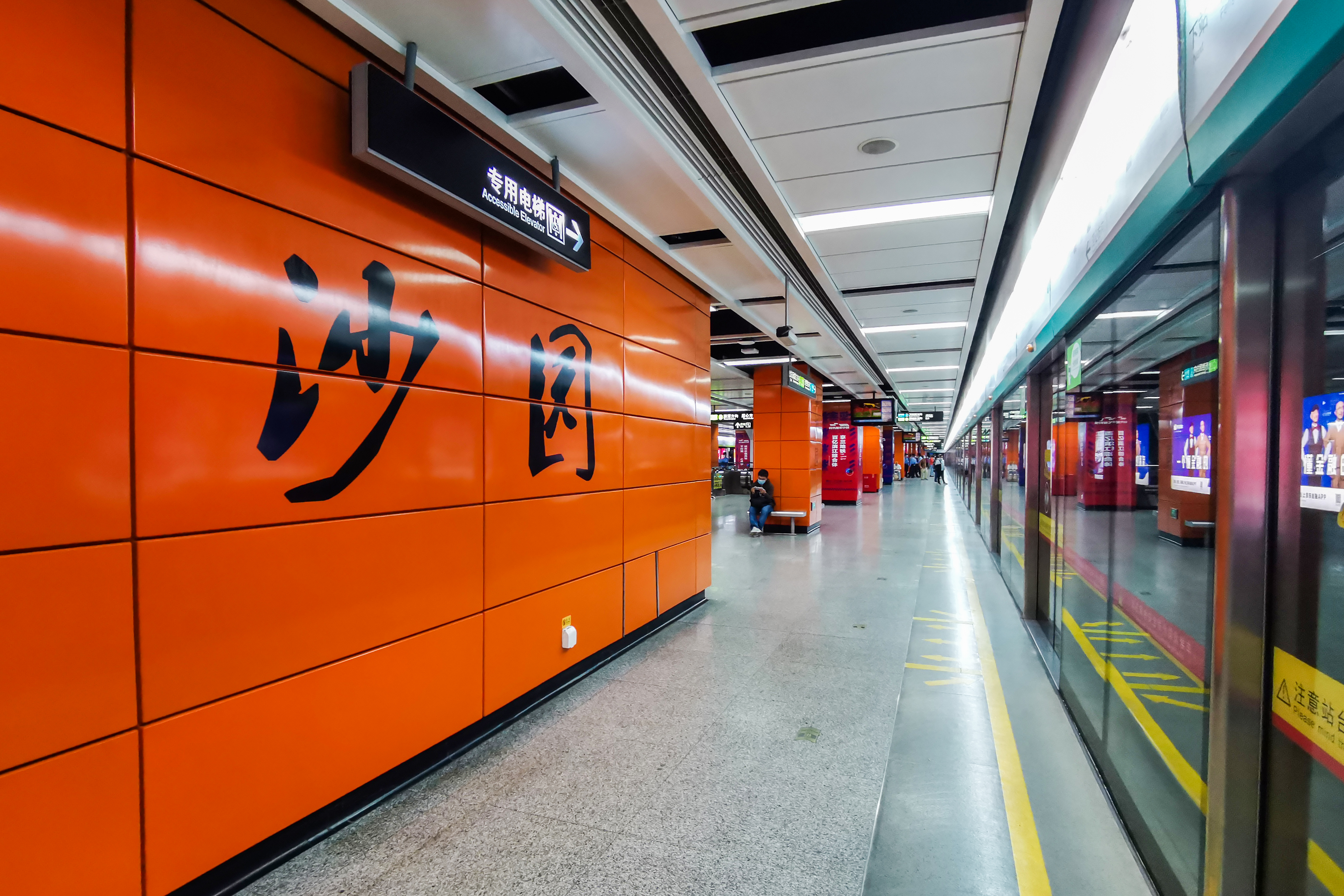
Platform 1 (Line 8 northbound platform)
