= Tongfuxi station =

Guangzhou Metro station

Tongfuxi 同福西
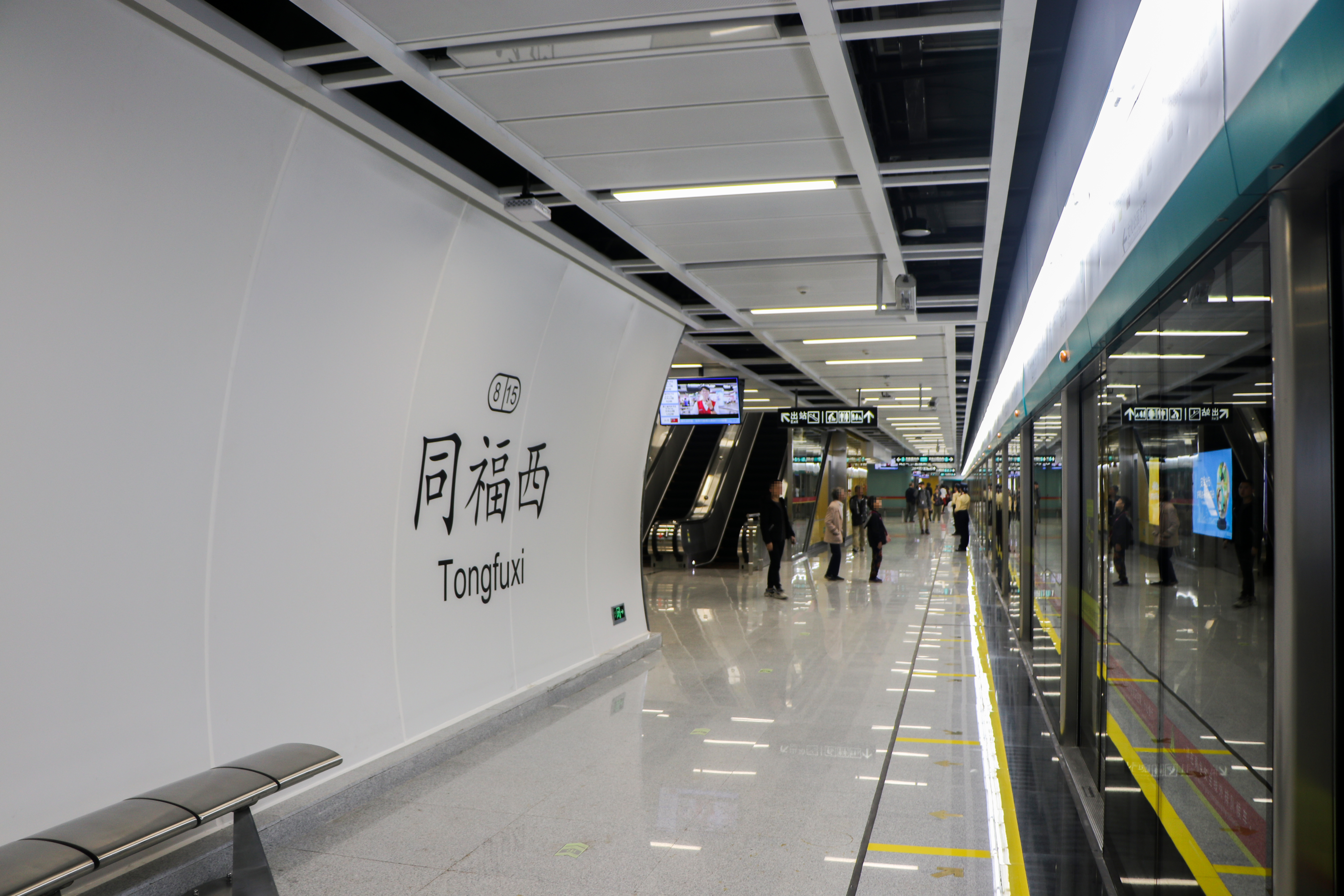
- Platform 1 (towards Jiaoxin)

Chinese name
- Chinese: 同福西站
Transcriptions
Standard Mandarin
- Hanyu Pinyin: Tóngfúxī Zhàn

General information
- Location: Haizhu District, Guangzhou, Guangdong; China
- Coordinates: 23.109186°N 113.248976°E
- Operator: Guangzhou Metro Co. Ltd.
- Line: Line 8
- Platforms: 2 (1 island platform)
- Tracks: 2

Construction
- Structure type: Underground
- Accessible: Yes

Other information
- Station code: 815

History
- Opened: 28 December 2019; 6 years ago

Services
Preceding station	Guangzhou Metro	Following station
Cultural Park towards Jiaoxin	Line 8	Fenghuang Xincun towards Wanshengwei
Location

Tongfuxi Station (Chinese: 同福西站; pinyin: Tóngfúxī Zhàn; lit. 'Tongfu West station') is a station on Line 8 of the Guangzhou Metro, between Cultural Park station and Fenghuang Xincun station. It is located underground in the Haizhu District and started operation on 28 December 2019.

== Station layout ==
G	-	Exits A, B, D, E
L1; Concourse	Lobby	Ticket Machines, Customer Service, Shops, Police Station, Safety Facilities
L2; Equipment Area	-	Station equipment
L3; Platforms	Platform 1	8 towards Jiaoxin (Cultural Park)
L3; Platforms	Side platform, doors will open on the left
L3; Platforms	Pedestrian Passageway	Passage linking platforms
L3; Platforms	Side platform, doors will open on the left
L3; Platforms	Platform 2	8 towards Wanshengwei (Fenghuang Xincun)

== Gallery ==
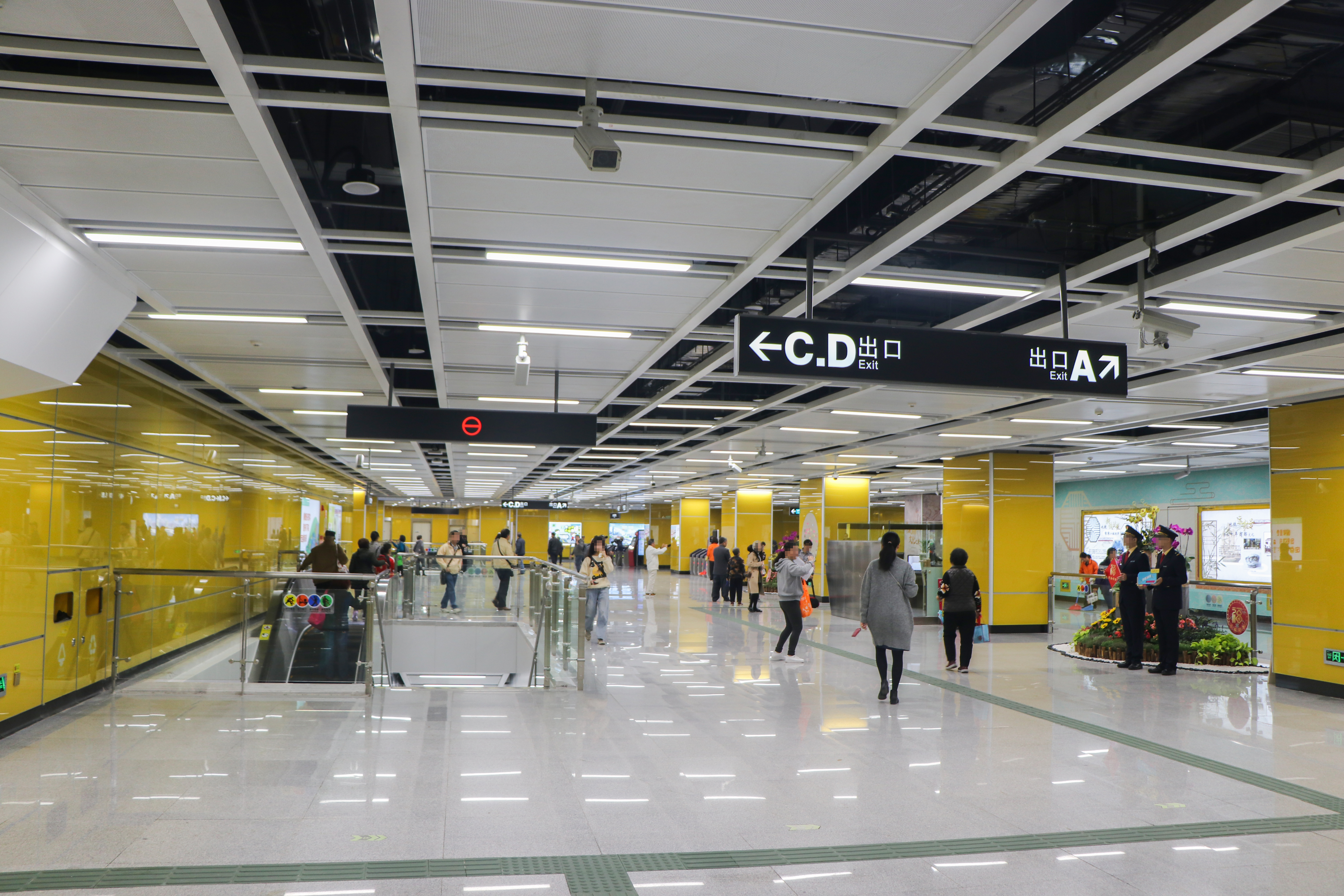
East concourse

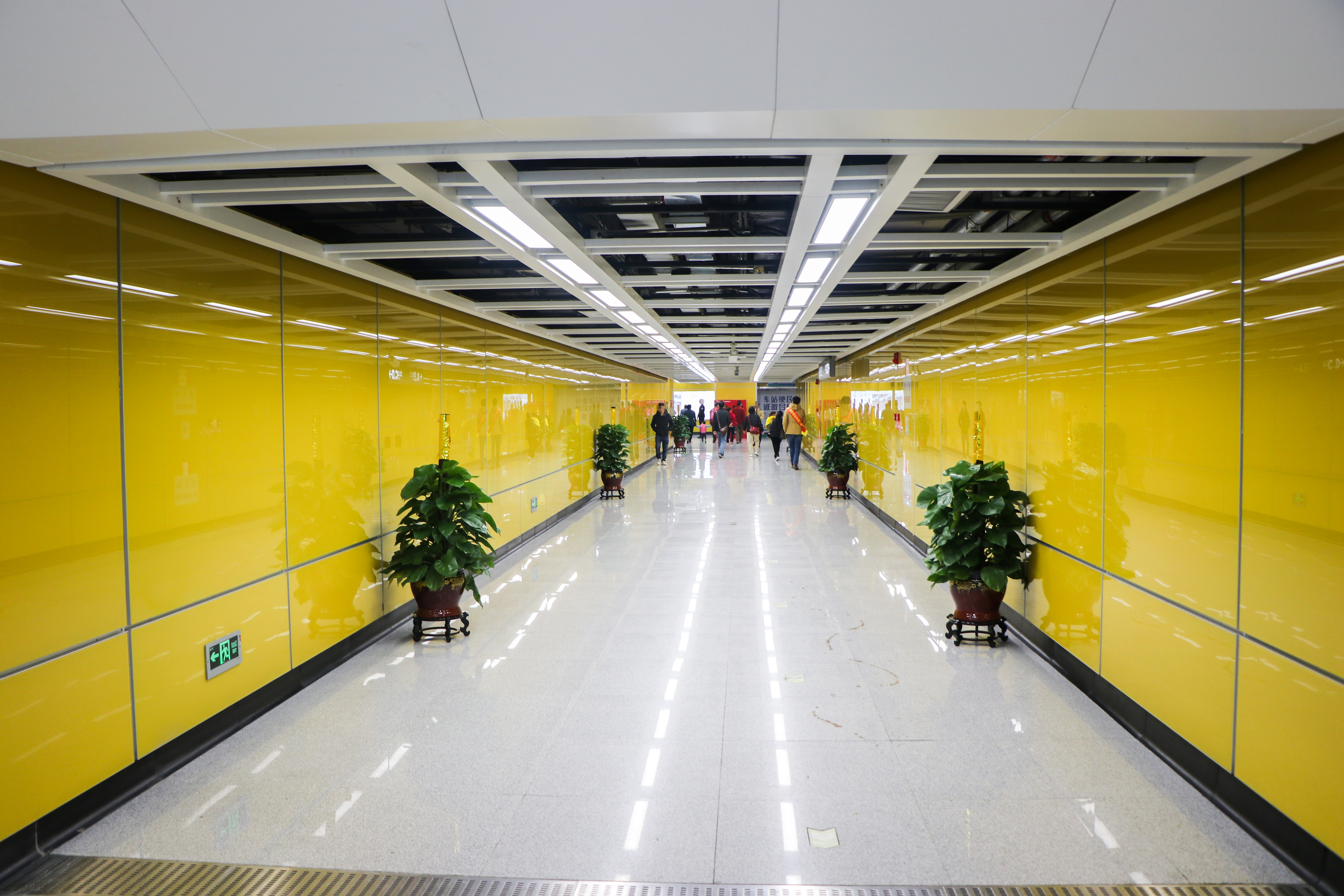
Concourse unpaid passageway

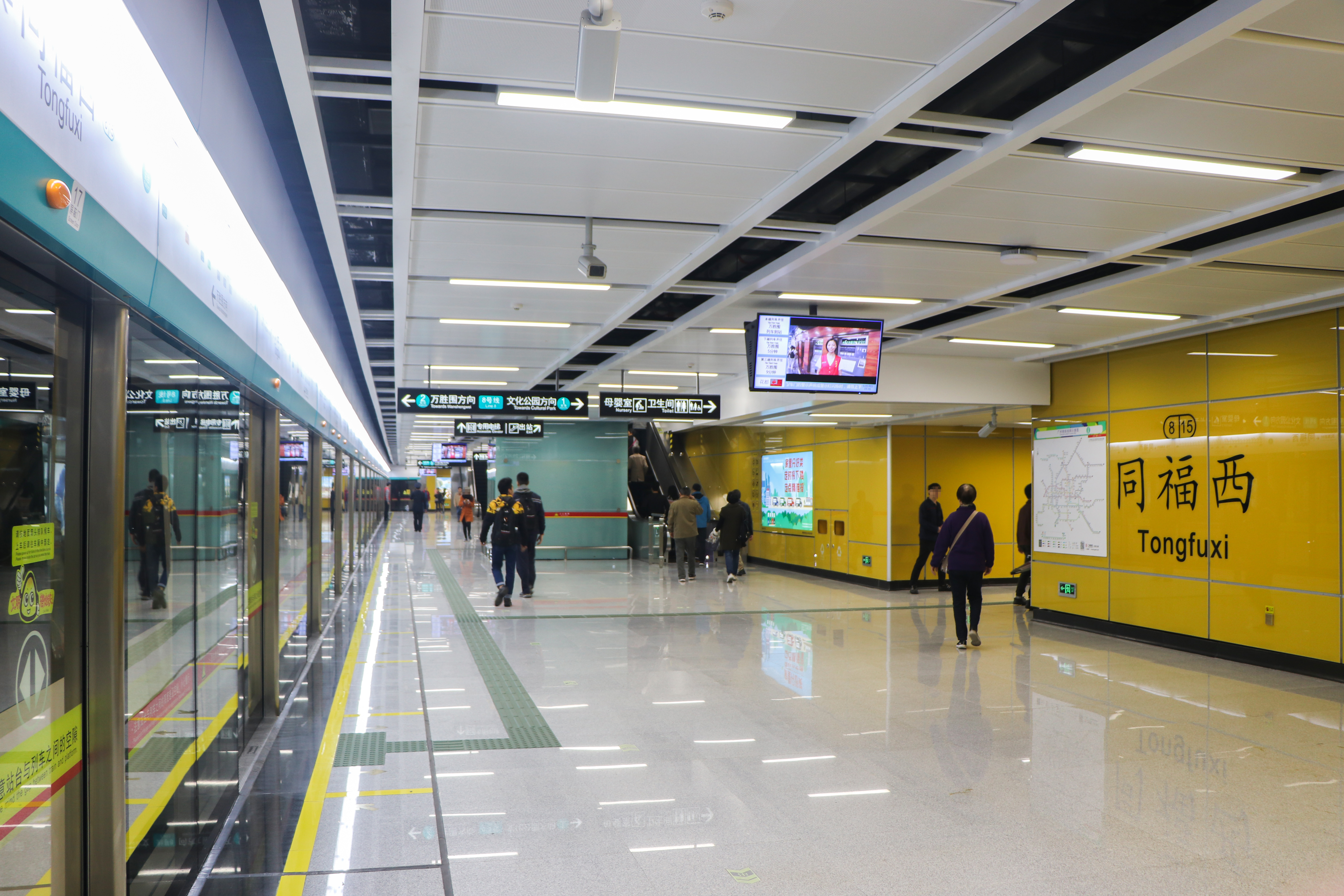
Platform 2 (towards Wanshengwei)

== Exits ==
Exit number	Exit location
Exit A	Tongfuxi Road
Exit B	Gongye Dadaobei
Exit D	Gongye Dadaobei
Exit E	Tongfuxi Road
