= Tuanyida Square station =

Guangzhou Metro station

Coordinates: 23.1186°N 113.2781°E

Tuanyida Square 团一大广场
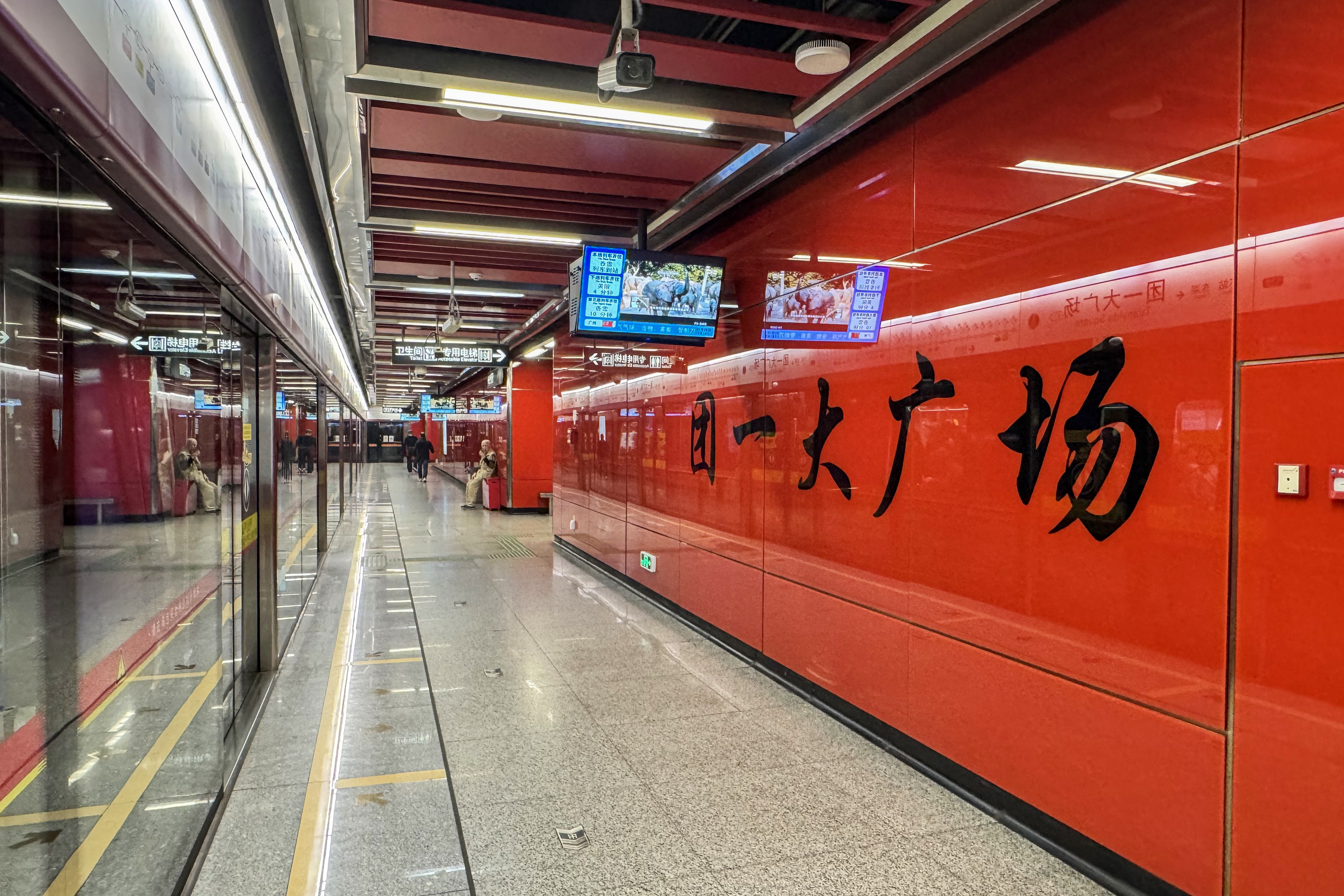

Chinese name
- Simplified Chinese: 团一大广场站
- Traditional Chinese: 團一大廣場站
Transcriptions
Standard Mandarin
- Hanyu Pinyin: Tuányīdà Guǎngchǎng Zhàn
Yue: Cantonese
- Jyutping: tyun^{4}jat^{1}daai^{6} gwong^{2}coeng^{4} zaam^{6}

General information
- Location: Dongyuan Cross Road (东园横路) and South Yuexiu Road (越秀南路) / Yicui Road (挹翠路); Yuexiu District, Guangzhou, Guangdong; China
- Operator: Guangzhou Metro Co. Ltd.
- Line: Line 6
- Platforms: 2 (1 island platform)

Construction
- Structure type: Underground

Other information
- Station code: 612

History
- Opened: 28 December 2013; 12 years ago

Services
Preceding station	Guangzhou Metro	Following station
Beijing Lu towards Xunfenggang	Line 6	Donghu towards Xiangxue
Location

Tuanyida Square Station (Chinese: 团一大广场站; lit. 'Square of the First National Congress of the Youth League station') is a station of Guangzhou Metro Line 6. It is located in the Yuexiu District of Guangzhou and started operation on 28 December 2013.

== Station layout ==
G	-	Exits
L1; Concourse	Lobby	Customer Service, Vending machines, ATMs
L2; Equipment Area	-	Station equipment
L3; Buffer Area	Equipment Area	Station equipment
L3; Buffer Area	-	Buffer area between Lobby and Platforms
L4; Platforms	Platform 2	6 towards Xunfenggang (Beijing Lu)
L4; Platforms	Island platform, doors will open on the left
L4; Platforms	Platform 1	6 towards Xiangxue (Donghu)

== Exits ==
Exit number	Exit location
Exit A	Yuexiu Nanlu
Exit B	Yicui Lu
