= Yide Lu station =

Guangzhou Metro station

Yide Lu 一德路
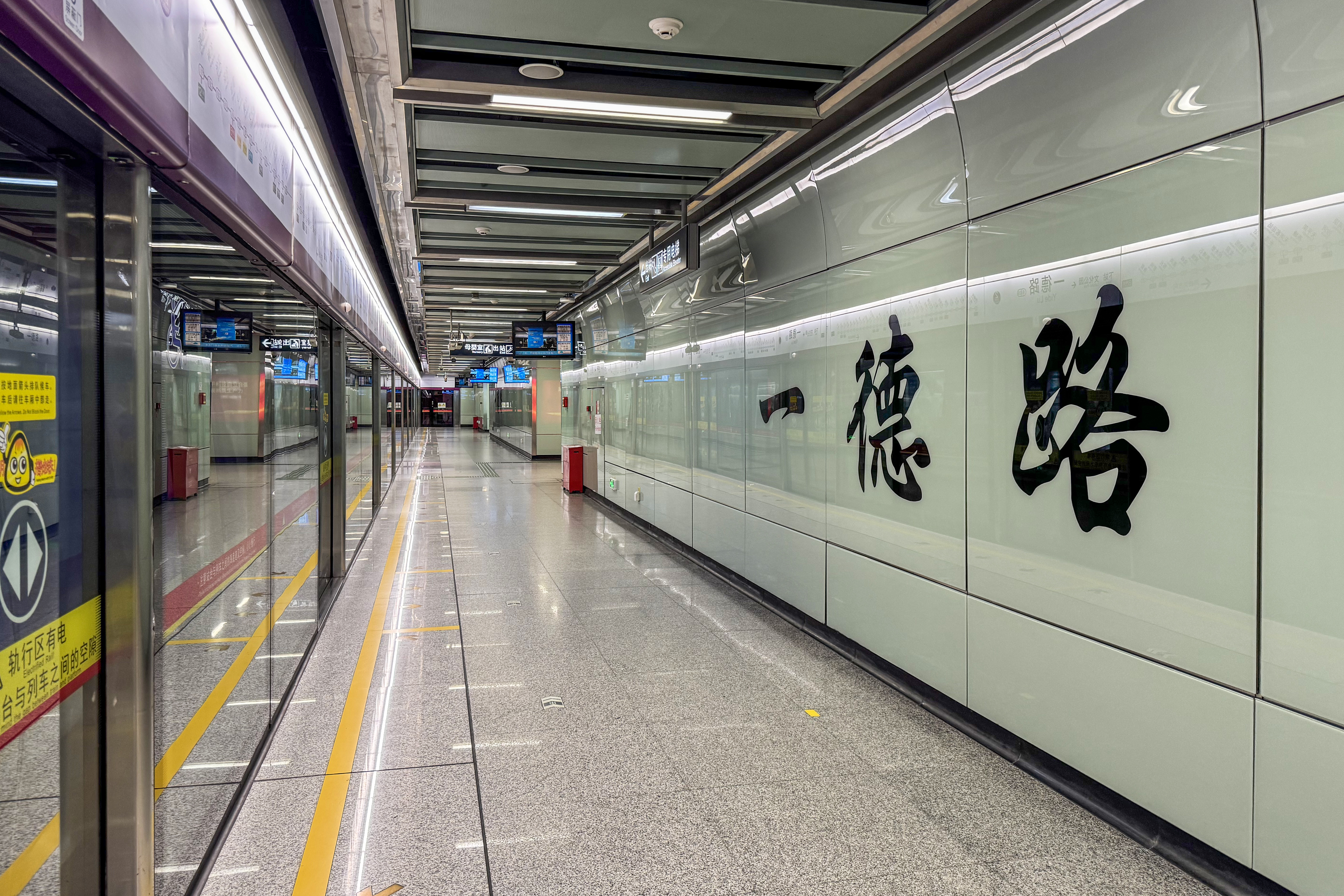
- Platform 2

General information
- Location: Yide Road and South Haizhu Road; Yuexiu District, Guangzhou, Guangdong; China
- Coordinates: 23.113036°N 113.2572°E
- Operated by: Guangzhou Metro Co. Ltd.
- Line: Line 6
- Platforms: 2 (1 island platform)

Construction
- Structure type: Underground

Other information
- Station code: 609

History
- Opened: 28 January 2015; 11 years ago

Services
Preceding station	Guangzhou Metro	Following station
Cultural Park towards Xunfenggang	Line 6	Haizhu Square towards Xiangxue
Location

Yide Lu Station (Chinese: 一德路站; pinyin: Yīdé Lù Zhàn; Jyutping: jat^{1}dak^{1} lou^{6} zaam^{6}) is a station on Line 6 of the Guangzhou Metro located in the Yuexiu District of Guangzhou. It began operation on 28 January 2015.

== Station layout ==
G	-	Exits
L1; Concourse	Lobby	Customer Service, Vending machines, ATMs
L2; Buffer Area	-	Buffer area between Lobby and Platforms
L3; Platforms	Platform 2	6 towards Xunfenggang (Cultural Park)
L3; Platforms	Island platform, doors will open on the left
L3; Platforms	Platform 1	6 towards Xiangxue (Haizhu Square)

== Exits ==
Exit number	Exit location
Exit A	Yide Lu
Exit B	Haizhu Nanlu

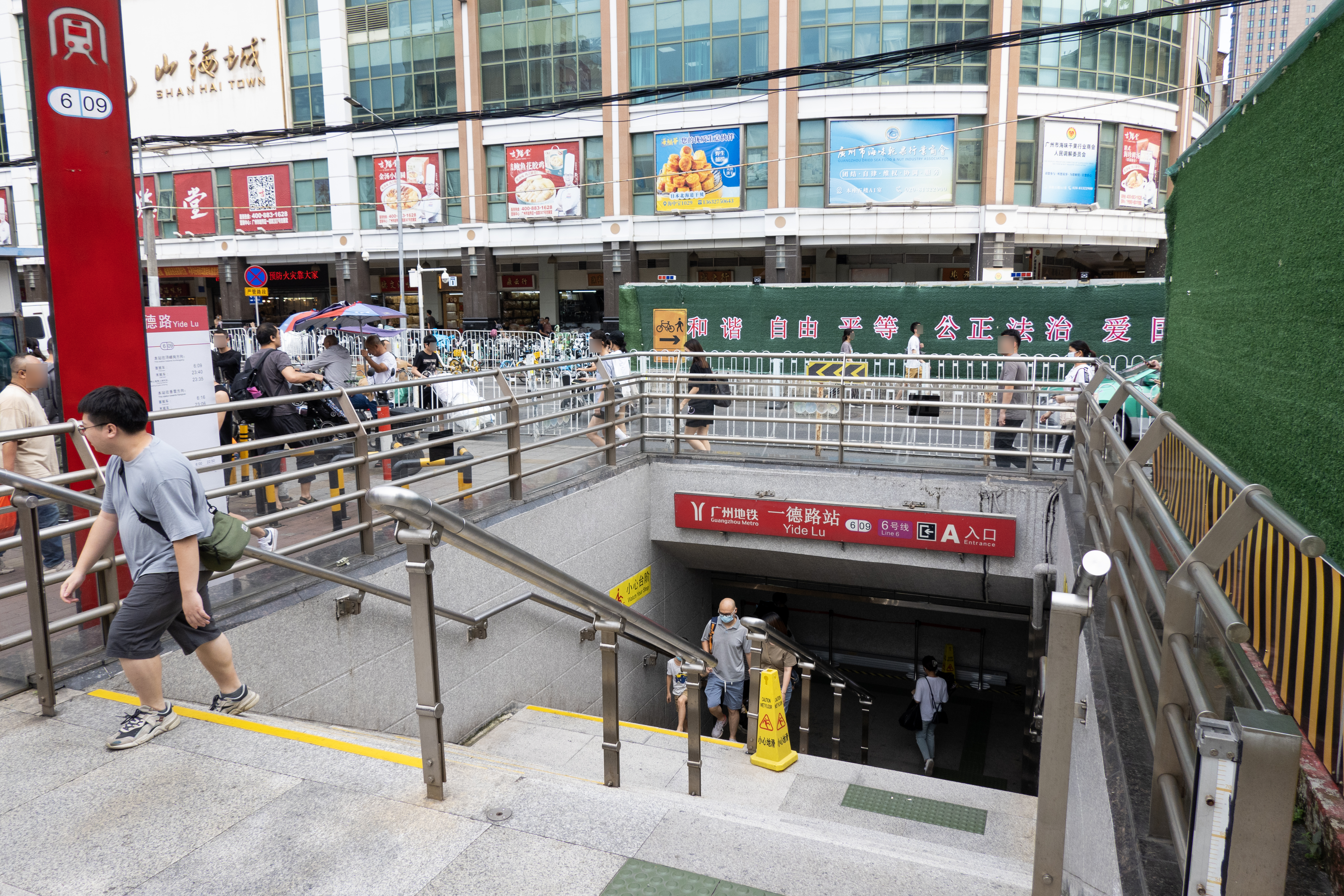
Exit A

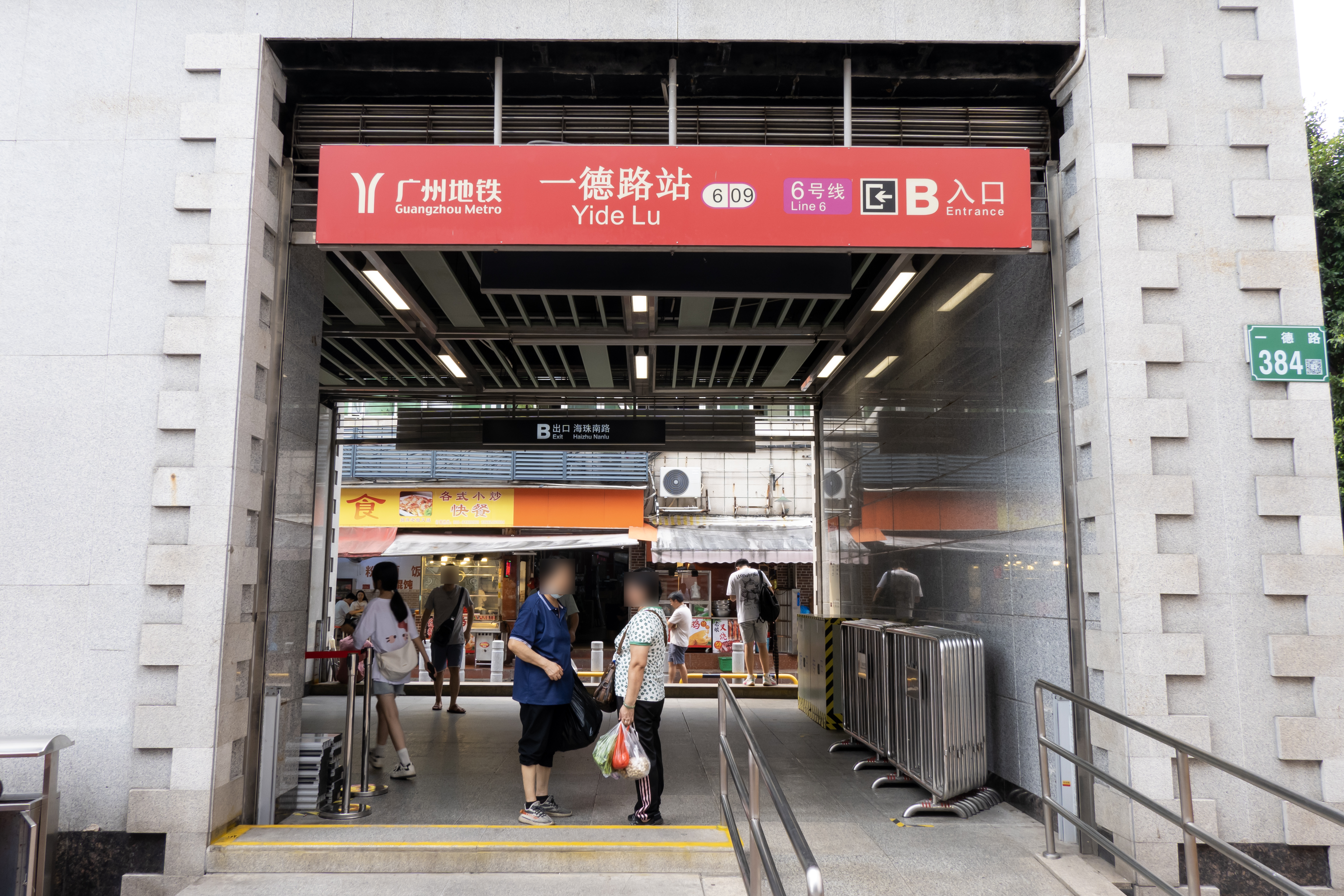
Exit B
