= Beijing Lu station =

Guangzhou Metro station

Coordinates: 23.1187°N 113.2703°E

Beijing Lu 北京路
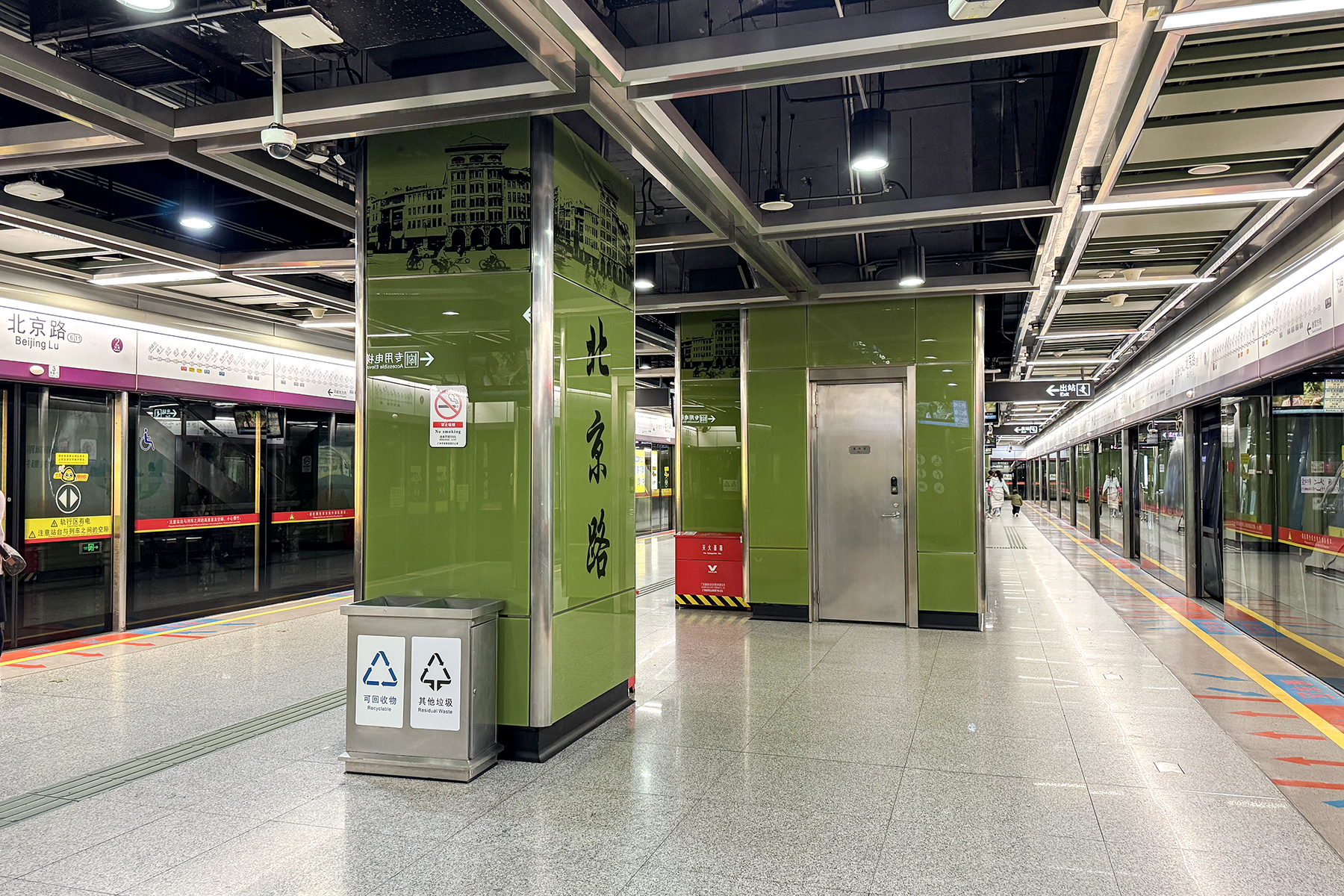

General information
- Location: Beijing Road and Wanfu Road (万福路); Yuexiu District, Guangzhou, Guangdong; China
- Operated by: Guangzhou Metro Co. Ltd.
- Line: Line 6
- Platforms: 2 (1 island platform)

Construction
- Structure type: Underground

Other information
- Station code: 611

History
- Opened: 28 December 2013; 12 years ago

Services
Preceding station	Guangzhou Metro	Following station
Haizhu Square towards Xunfenggang	Line 6	Tuanyida Square towards Xiangxue
Location

Beijing Lu Station (Chinese: 北京路站; pinyin: Běijīng Lù Zhàn; Jyutping: bak^{1}ging^{1} lou^{6} zaam^{6}) is a station of Guangzhou Metro Line 6. It is located underground in Yuexiu District near the Beijing Road Pedestrian Street. It started operation on 28 December 2013.

== Station layout ==
G	-	Exits
L1; Concourse	Lobby	Customer Service, Shop, Vending machines, ATMs
L2; Equipment Area	-	Station equipment
L3; Platforms	Platform 2	6 towards Xunfenggang (Haizhu Square)
L3; Platforms	Island platform, doors will open on the left
L3; Platforms	Platform 1	6 towards Xiangxue (Tuanyida Square)

== Exits ==
Exit number	Exit location
Exit A	Beijing Lu
Exit B	Wanfu Lu
