= Cultural Park station =

Guangzhou Metro station

Cultural Park 文化公园
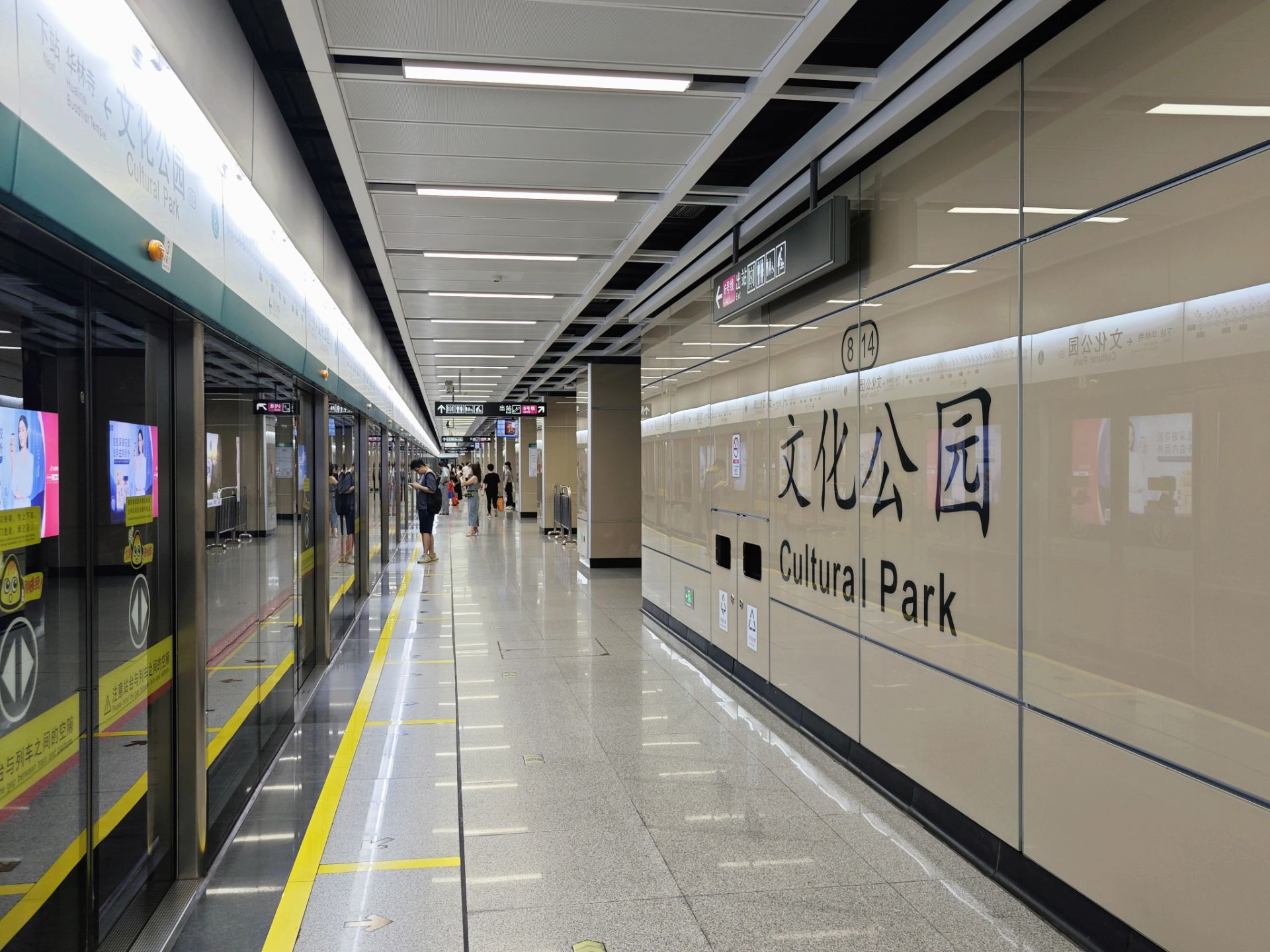
- Line 8 platform

Chinese name
- Simplified Chinese: 文化公园站
- Traditional Chinese: 文化公園站
Transcriptions
Standard Mandarin
- Hanyu Pinyin: Wénhuà Gōngyuán Zhàn
Yue: Cantonese
- Jyutping: Man^{4}faa^{3} Gung^{1}jyun^{4} Zaam^{6}

General information
- Location: Liwan District, Guangzhou, Guangdong; China
- Coordinates: 23°06′33″N 113°14′56″E
- Operated by: Guangzhou Metro Co. Ltd.
- Lines: Line 6; Line 8
- Platforms: 4 (1 island platform and 1 split island platform)
- Tracks: 4

Construction
- Structure type: Underground
- Accessible: Yes

Other information
- Station code: 608 814

History
- Opened: 28 December 2013; 12 years ago (Line 6); 28 December 2019; 6 years ago (Line 8)

Services
Preceding station	Guangzhou Metro	Following station
Huangsha towards Xunfenggang	Line 6	Yide Lu towards Xiangxue
Hualinsi Buddhist Temple towards Jiaoxin	Line 8	Tongfuxi towards Wanshengwei
Location

Cultural Park station (simplified Chinese: 文化公园站; traditional Chinese: 文化公園站; pinyin: Wénhuà Gōngyuán Zhàn) is an interchange station between Line 6 and Line 8 of the Guangzhou Metro. It is located underground in the Liwan District and started operation on 28 December 2013.

== Station layout ==
G	-	Exits A, B, D, E
L1; Concourse	Lobby	Ticket Machines, Customer Service, Shops, Police Station, Safety Facilities, Toilets
L2; Equipment Area	-	Station equipment
L3; Line 6 Platforms	Reserved Zone	Reserved for Line 8
L3; Line 6 Platforms	Platform 2	6 towards Xunfenggang (Huangsha)
L3; Line 6 Platforms	Island platform, doors will open on the left
L3; Line 6 Platforms	Platform 1	6 towards Xiangxue (Yide Lu)
L4; Line 8 Platforms	Platform 3	8 towards Jiaoxin (Hualinsi Buddhist Temple)
L4; Line 8 Platforms	Side platform, doors will open on the left
L4; Line 8 Platforms	Pedestrian Passageway	Passage linking Line 8 platforms
L4; Line 8 Platforms	Side platform, doors will open on the left
L4; Line 8 Platforms	Platform 4	8 towards Wanshengwei (Tongfuxi)

== Entrances/exits ==
- A: Xidi Ermalu
- B: Liu'ersan Road
- D: Xidi Ermalu
- E: Zhen'an Road (镇安路)
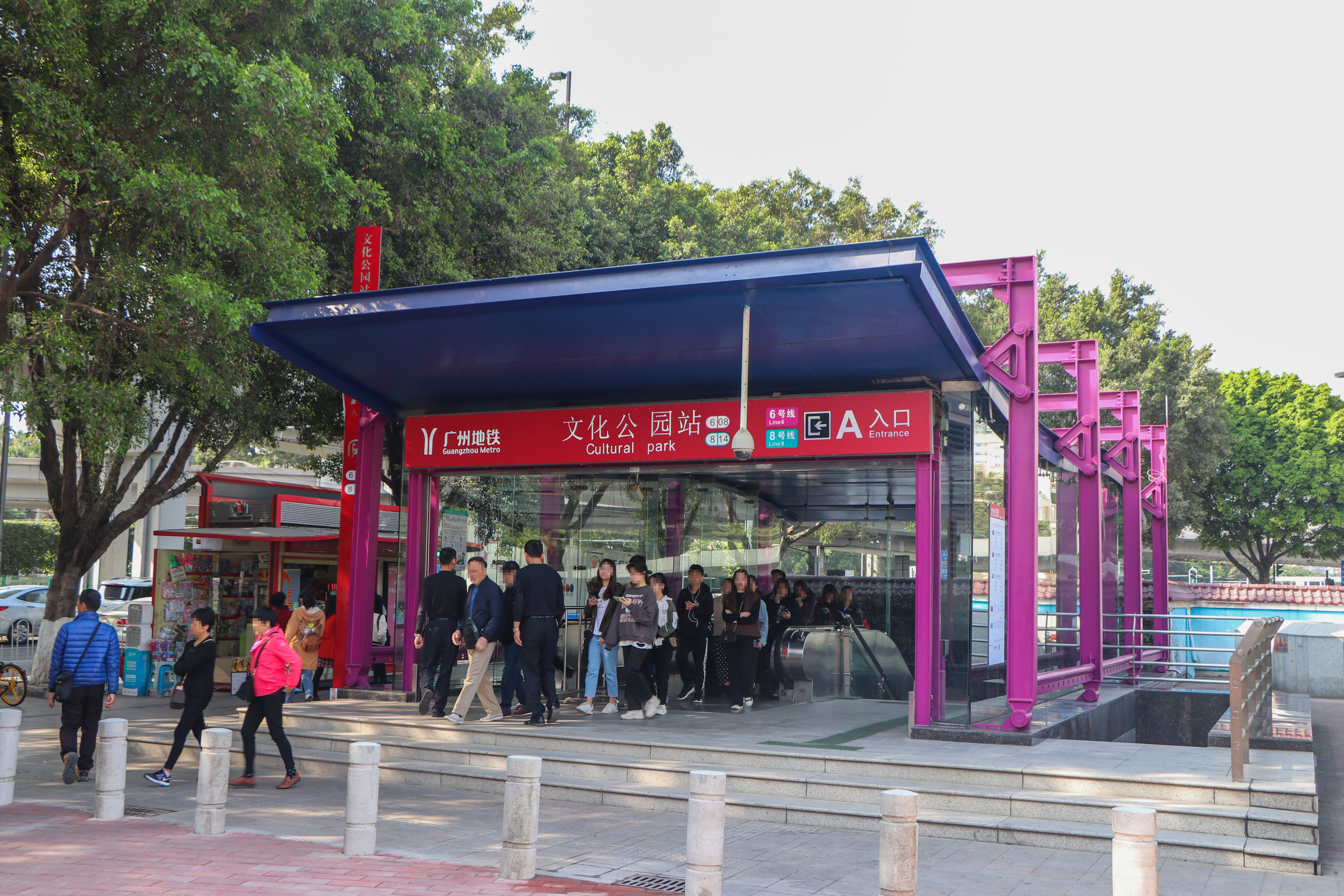
Exit A

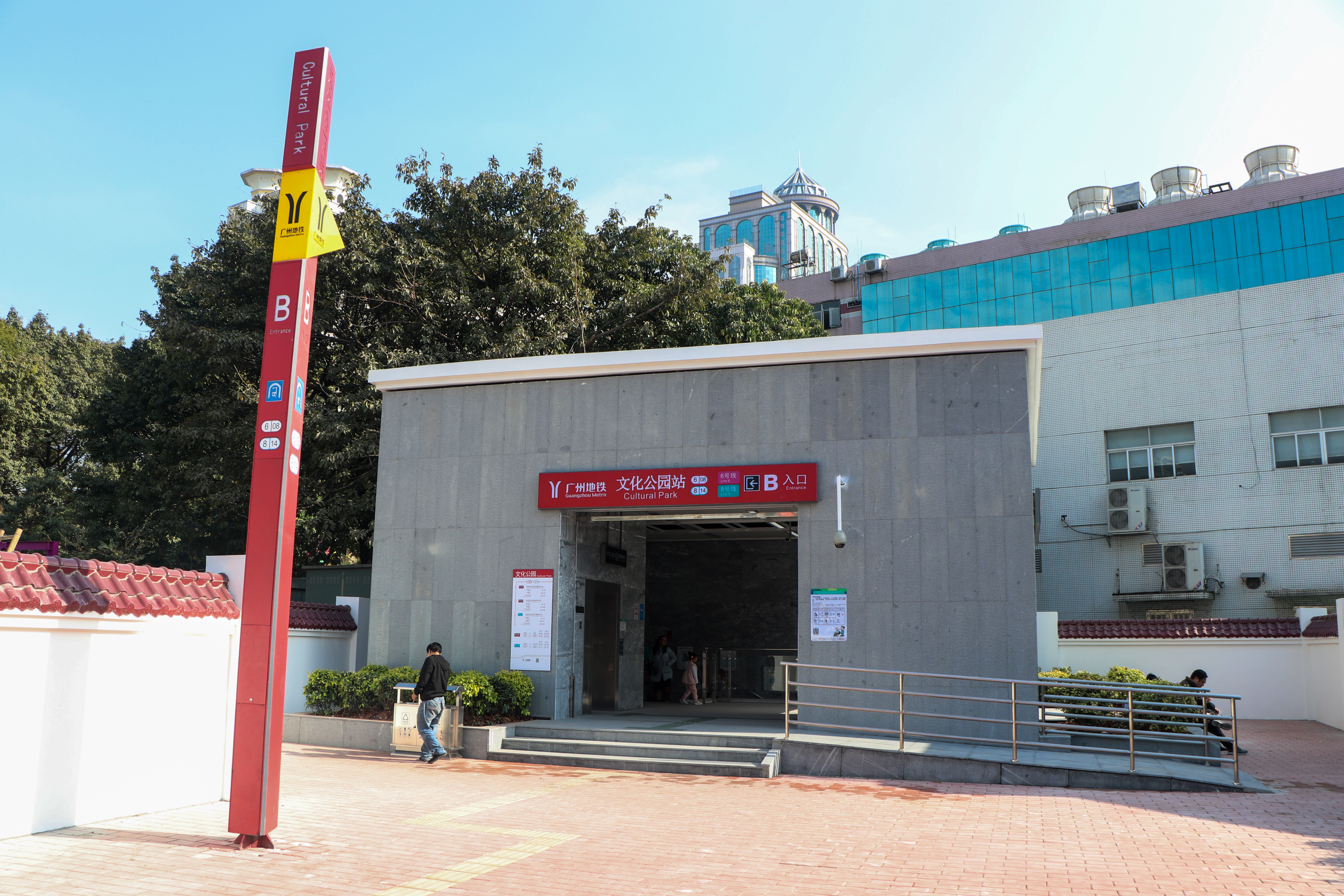
Exit B

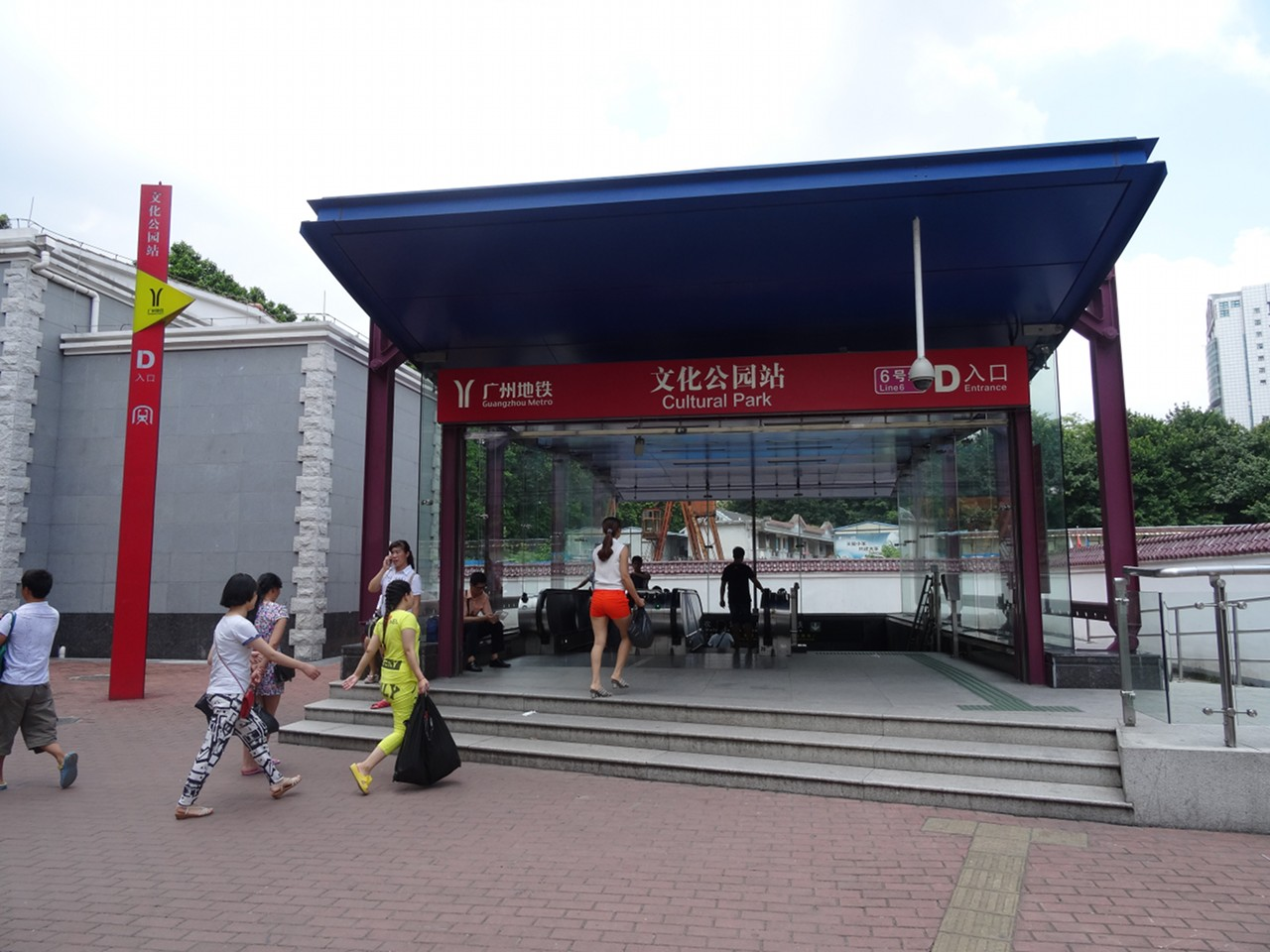
Exit D

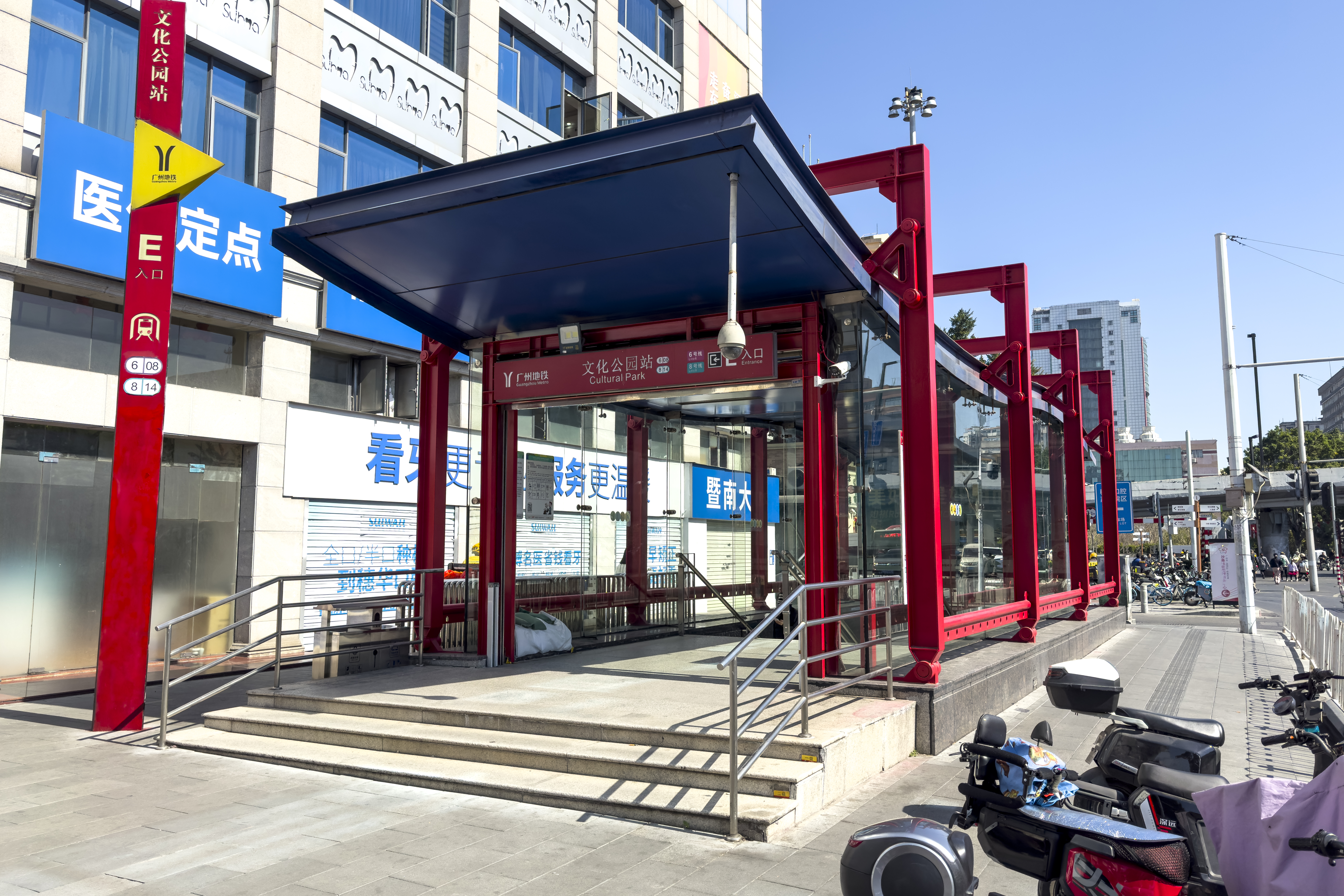
Exit E

== Gallery ==
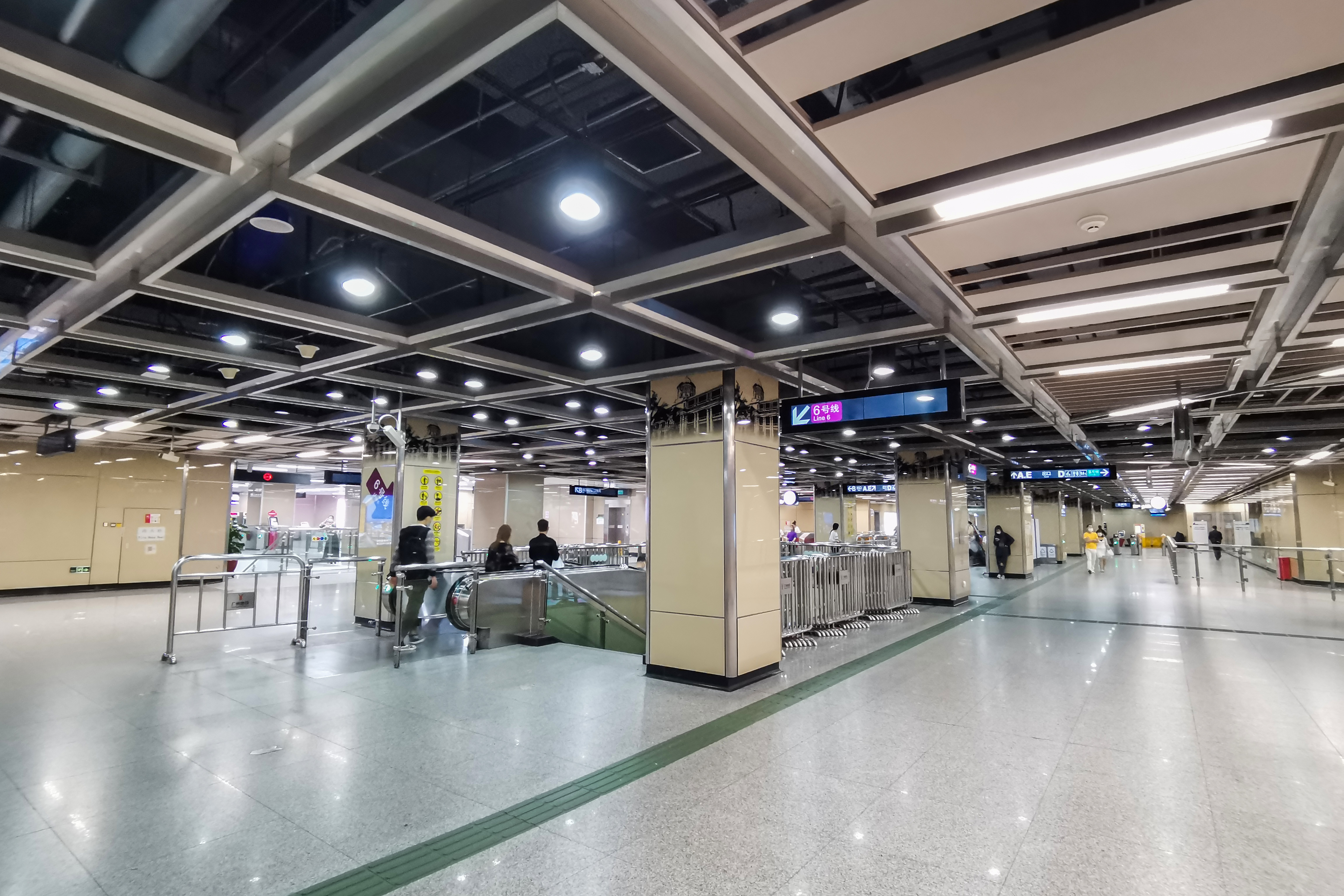
West concourse (Line 6)

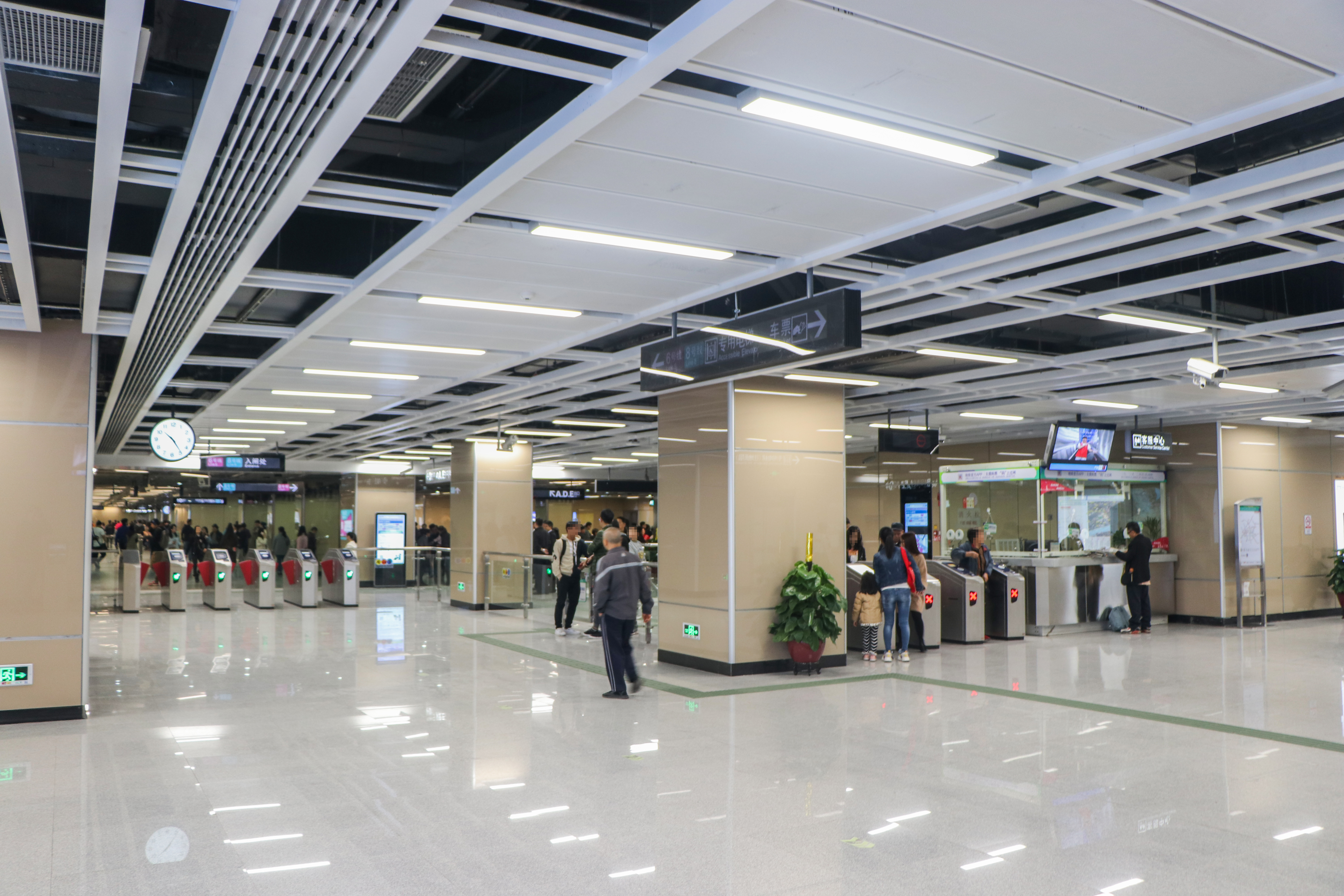
South concourse (Line 8)

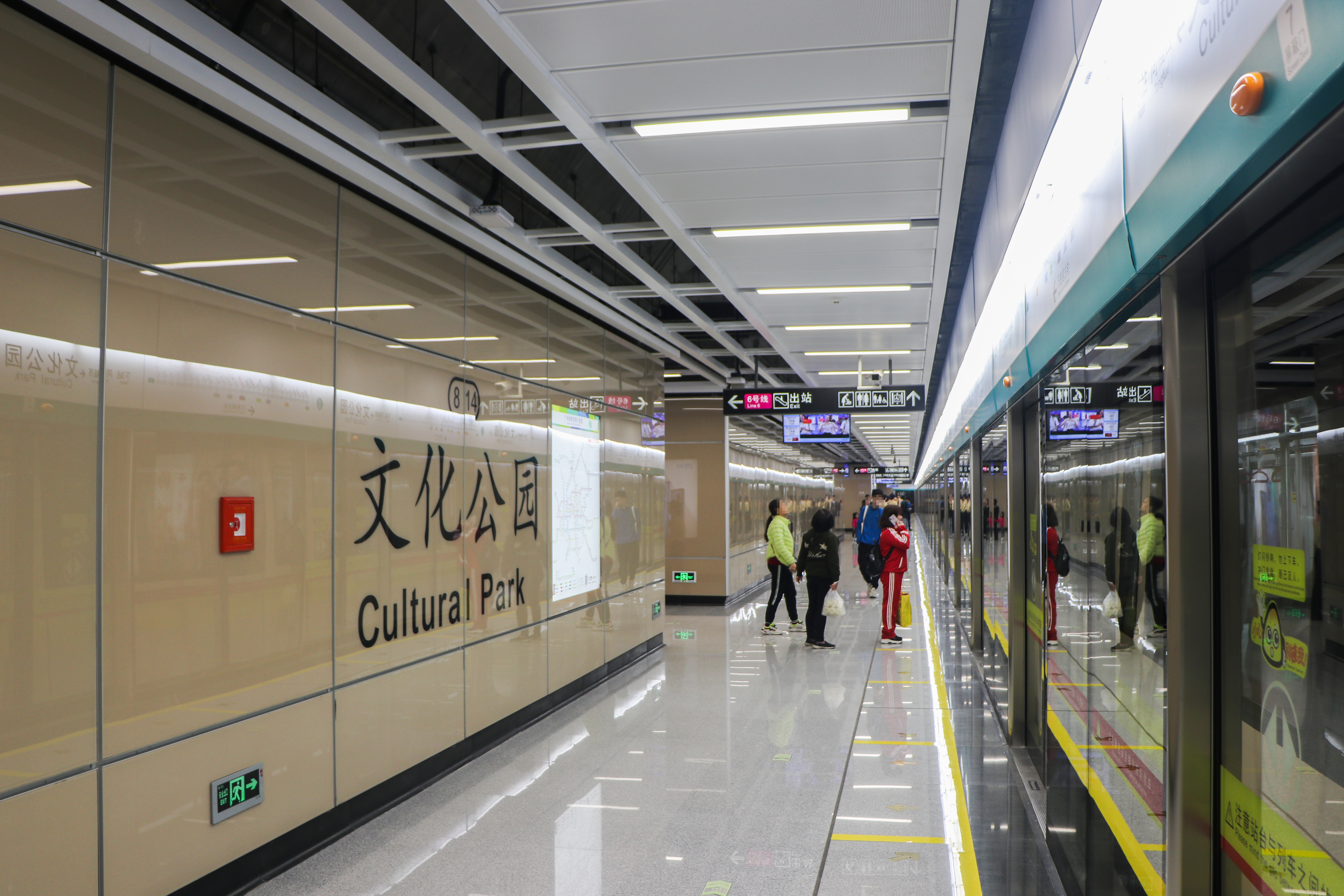
Platform 4 (Line 8 towards Wanshengwei)

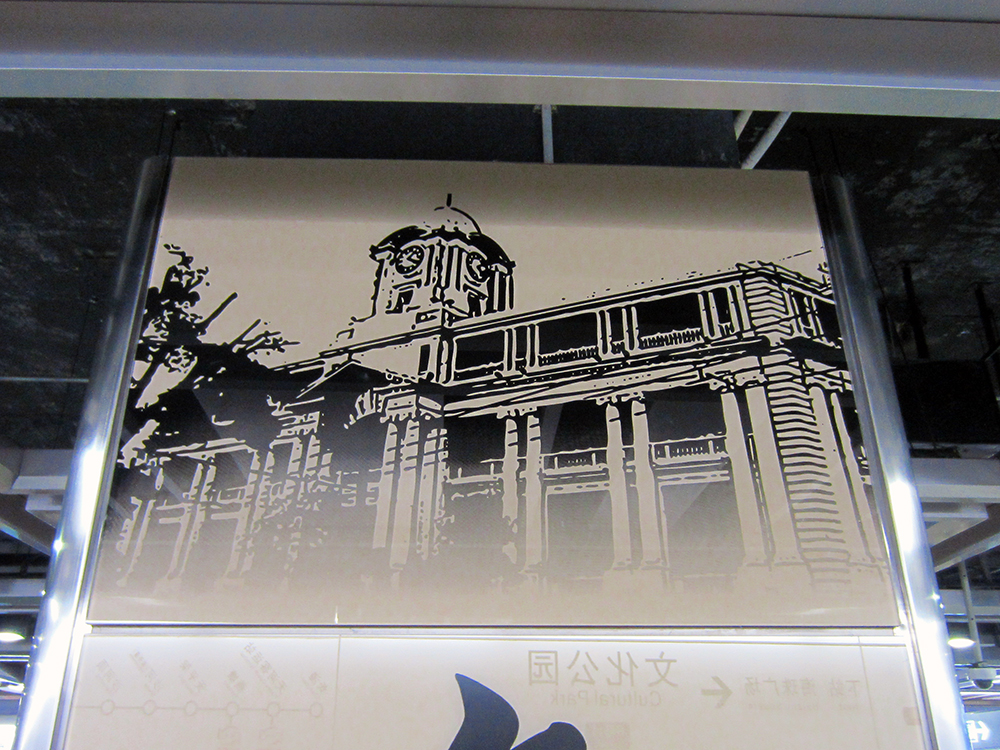
Line 6 platform wall decoration

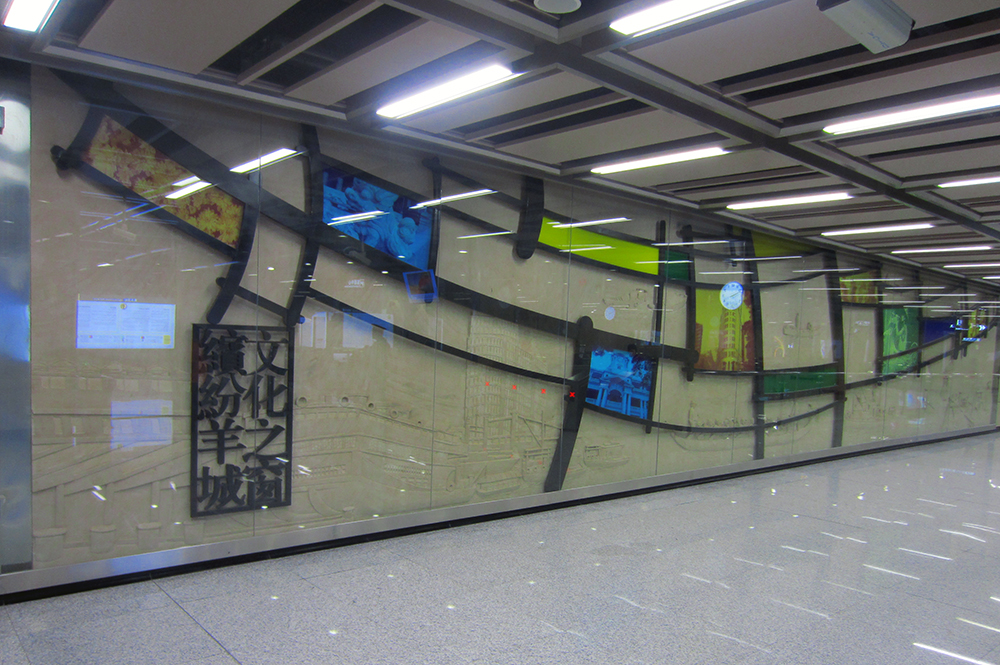
Culture wall
