= Party Pier station =

Haizhu Tram station in Guangzhou

Party Pier 琶醍
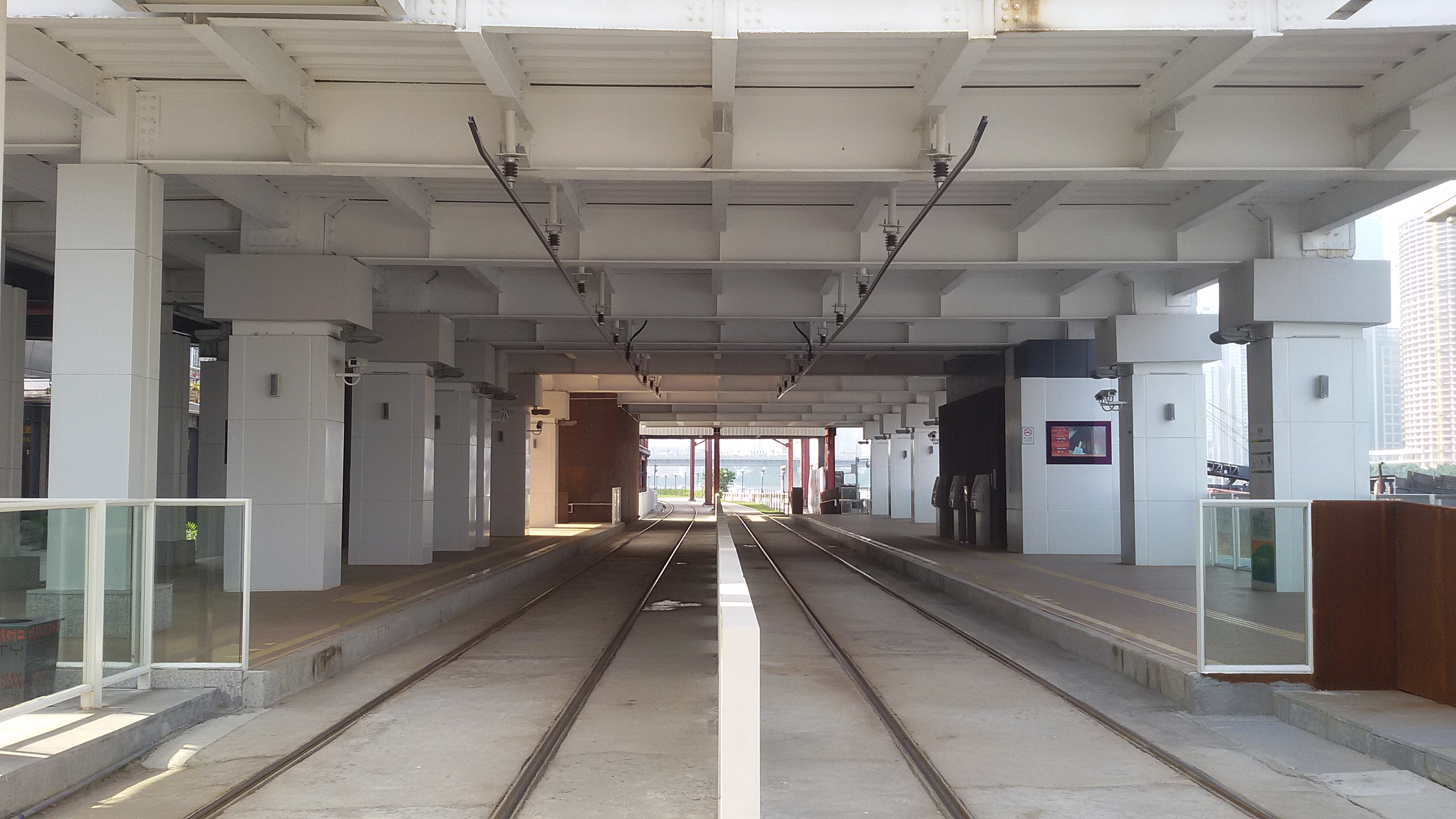

General information
- Location: Haizhu, Guangzhou, Guangdong; China
- Operated by: Guangzhou Metro Co. Ltd.
- Line: Haizhu Tram

Other information
- Station code: THZ103

History
- Opened: 21 October 2015

Services
Preceding station	Guangzhou Metro	Following station
Liede Bridge South towards Canton Tower	Haizhu Tram	Nanfeng towards Wanshengwei
Location

Party Pier station (Chinese: 琶醍站), is a station of Haizhu Tram of the Guangzhou Metro. It started operations on 21 October 2015.
