= Pazhou Bridge South station =

Haizhu Tram station in Guangzhou

Pazhou Bridge South 琶洲大桥南
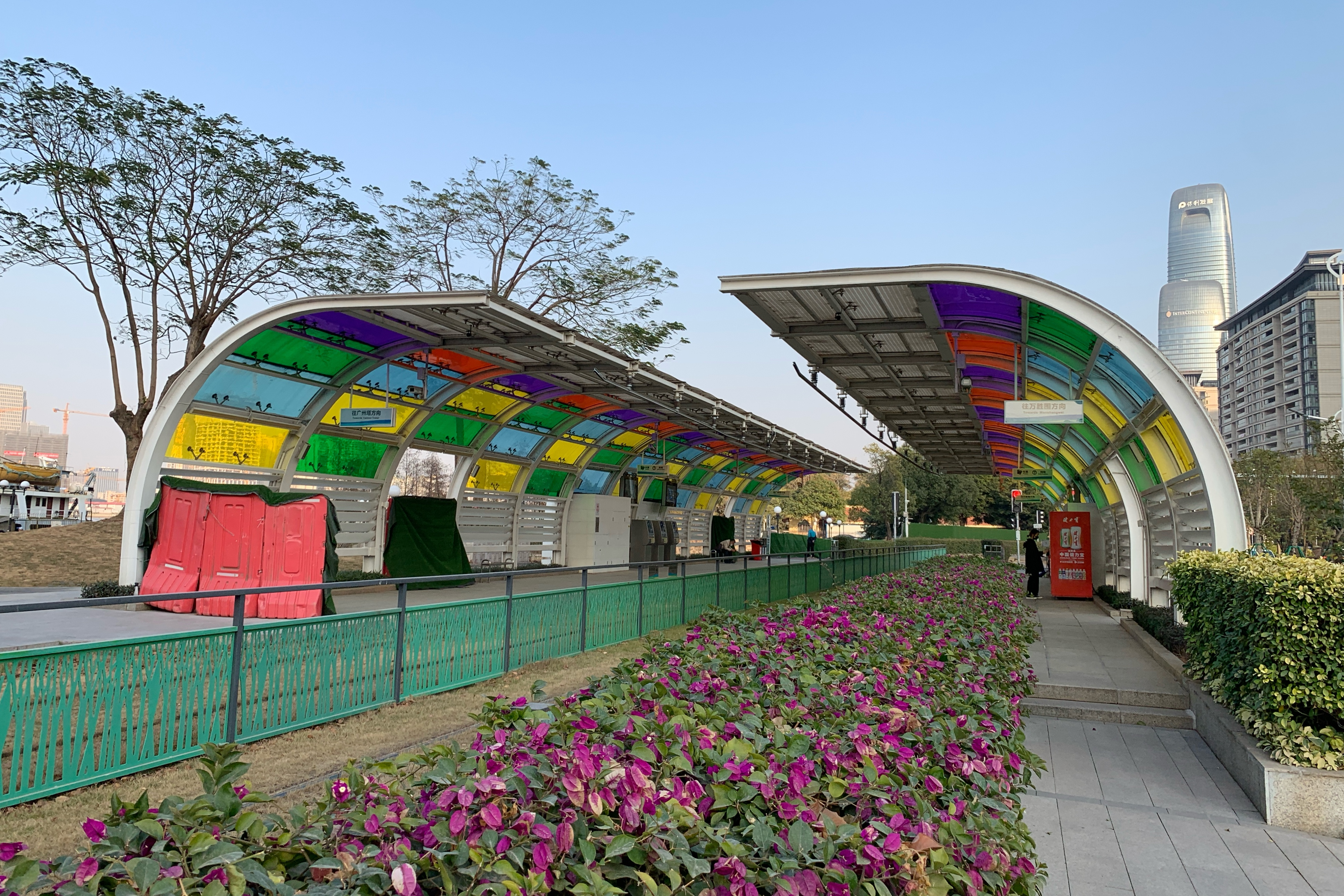

General information
- Location: Haizhu, Guangzhou, Guangdong; China
- Operated by: Guangzhou Metro Co. Ltd.
- Line: Haizhu Tram

Other information
- Station code: THZ108

History
- Opened: 31 December 2014

Services
Preceding station	Guangzhou Metro	Following station
Canton Fair Complex East towards Canton Tower	Haizhu Tram	Pazhou Pagoda towards Wanshengwei
Location

Pazhou Bridge South station (Chinese: 琶洲大桥南站), is a station of Haizhu Tram of the Guangzhou Metro. It started operations on 31 December 2014.
