= Liede Bridge South station =

Haizhu Tram station in Guangzhou

Liede Bridge South 猎德大桥南
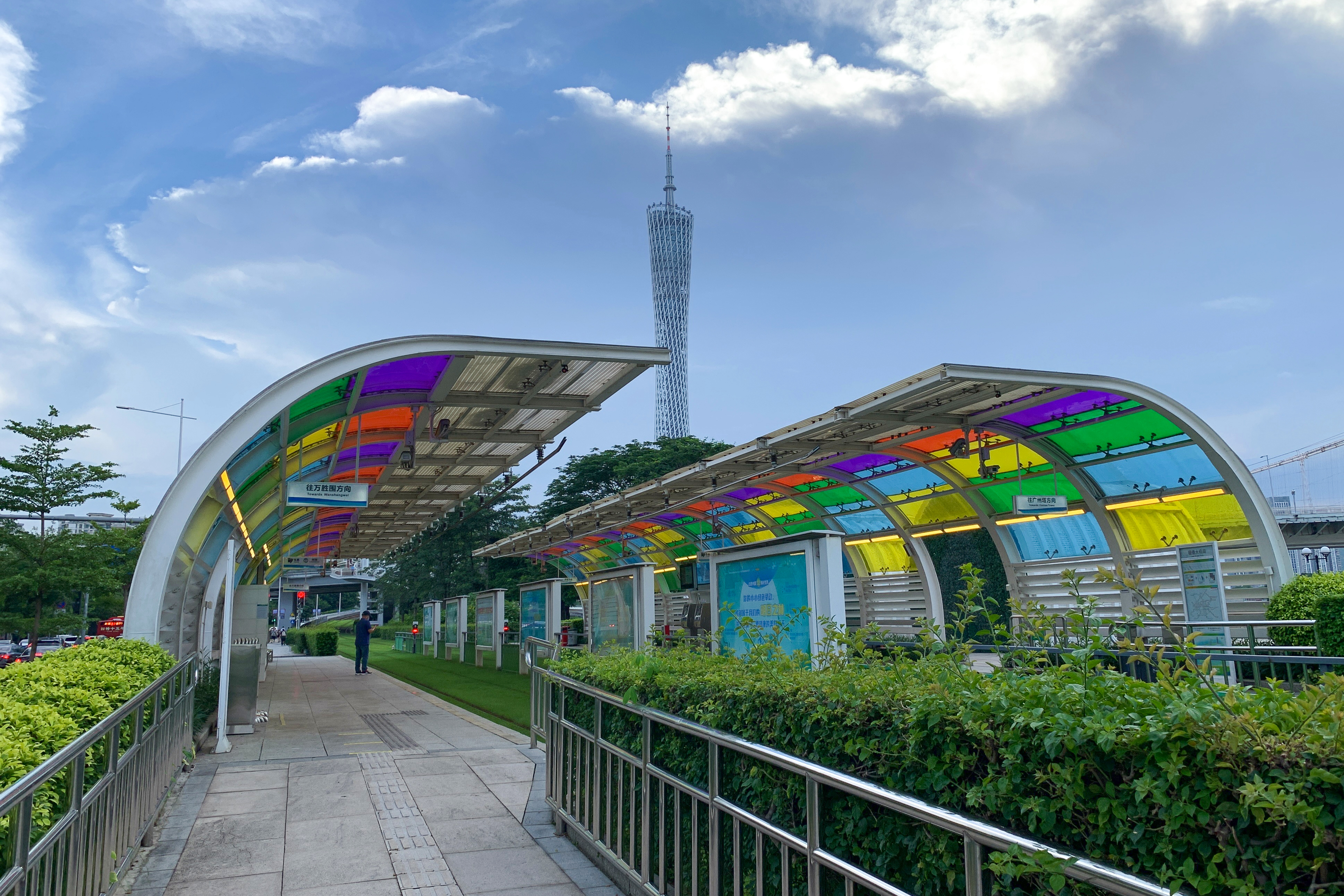

General information
- Location: Haizhu, Guangzhou, Guangdong; China
- Coordinates: 23.1102°N 113.3301°E
- Operated by: Guangzhou Metro Co. Ltd.
- Line: Haizhu Tram

Construction
- Structure type: At-grade

Other information
- Station code: THZ102

History
- Opened: 31 December 2014

Services
Preceding station	Guangzhou Metro	Following station
Canton Tower Terminus	Haizhu Tram	Party Pier towards Wanshengwei
Location

Liede Bridge South station (Chinese: 猎德大桥南站) is a station on the Haizhu Tram line of Guangzhou's tram network, operated by Guangzhou Metro. Located in Haizhu District, the station is situated on the southern bank of the Pearl River near Liede Bridge. It opened on 31 December 2014 as part of the initial section of the Haizhu Tram, which was the first modern tram line to operate in Guangzhou.

== History ==
The Haizhu Tram, officially known as the Haizhu Island Circular New Tram (Chinese: 海珠环岛新型有轨电车) and also called YoungTram, began trial operations on 31 December 2014. Liede Bridge South was one of the original stations to open with the line, which was the first of Guangzhou's planned modern tram lines to enter service. The 7.7 km (4.8 mi) tram line runs along the northern shore of Haizhu Island beside the Pearl River, connecting Canton Tower in the west with Wanshengwei in the east.

== Location ==
The station is named after Liede Bridge (Chinese: 猎德大桥), a 4.3 km (2.7 mi) cable-stayed bridge that crosses the Pearl River immediately north of the station. Opened in July 2009, Liede Bridge connects Pazhou Island in Haizhu District with Tianhe District and was the first cable-stayed bridge in Guangzhou. The bridge features a distinctive shell-shaped single-pylon design and is nicknamed the "Pearl of the Pearl River". It is a prominent feature of the Guangzhou International Light Festival and is known for its nighttime illumination; in April 2023, French President Emmanuel Macron shared a video of the bridge's light show on social media following his visit to China.

From the station, passengers have direct access to Liede Bridge's pedestrian pathways, which offer panoramic views of the Pearl River, Canton Tower, the Tianhe CBD skyline, and Zhujiang New Town. The area beneath the bridge includes a riverside park.

== Service ==
Liede Bridge South is an at-grade station with side platforms serving trams in both directions on the Haizhu Tram line. Trams operate between Canton Tower and Wanshengwei at approximately 15-minute intervals, with a journey time of 25–30 minutes for the full route. The fare is CNY 2 per trip.

== Station layout ==
G Platforms	-	Exits
G Platforms	Side platform, doors will open on the right
G Platforms	Platform 1	THZ1 towards Wanshengwei (Party Pier)
G Platforms	Platform 2	THZ1 towards Canton Tower (Canton Tower East)
G Platforms	Side platform, doors will open on the right
G Platforms	-	Exits

== Surroundings ==
The station provides access to:

- Liede Bridge – pedestrian walkways with views of the Pearl River and city skyline
- Riverside Park – located beneath Liede Bridge along the Pearl River
- Modiesha Park – nearby along the tram route
- Canton Tower – visible from the bridge and accessible via the tram line

== See also ==
- Haizhu Tram
- Guangzhou Tram
- Liede Bridge
