= Canton Fair Complex East station =

Haizhu Tram station in Guangzhou, China

Canton Fair Complex East 会展东
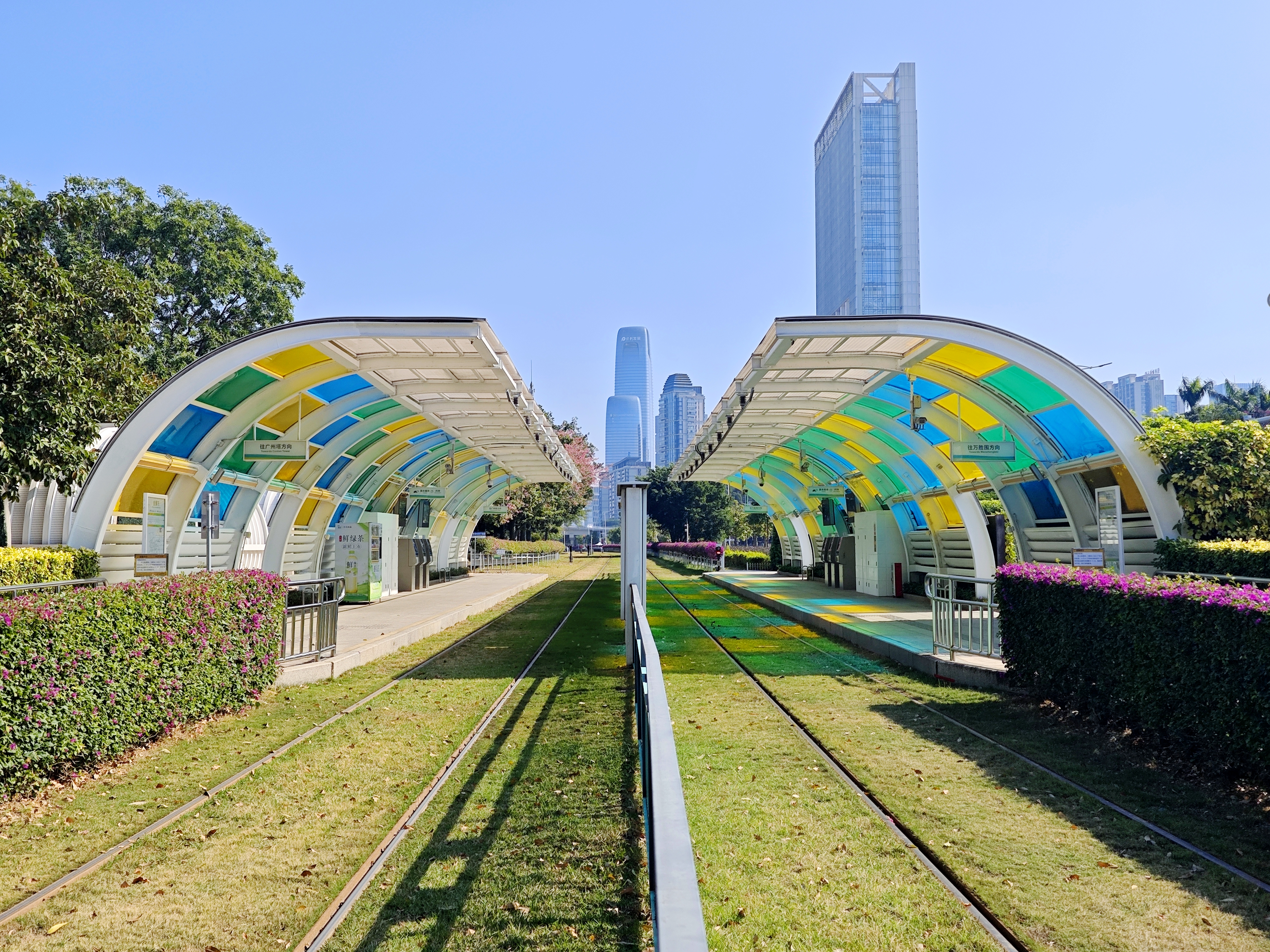

General information
- Location: Haizhu, Guangzhou, Guangdong; China
- Coordinates: 23.11°N 113.36°E
- Operated by: Guangzhou Metro Co. Ltd.
- Line: Haizhu Tram

Other information
- Station code: THZ107

History
- Opened: 31 December 2014

Services
Preceding station	Guangzhou Metro	Following station
Canton Fair Complex Middle towards Canton Tower	Haizhu Tram	Pazhou Bridge South towards Wanshengwei
Location

Canton Fair Complex East station (Chinese: 会展东站), is a station of Haizhu Tram of the Guangzhou Metro. It started operations on 31 December 2014.
