= Canton Fair Complex Middle station =

Haizhu Tram station in Guangzhou, China

Canton Fair Complex Middle 会展中
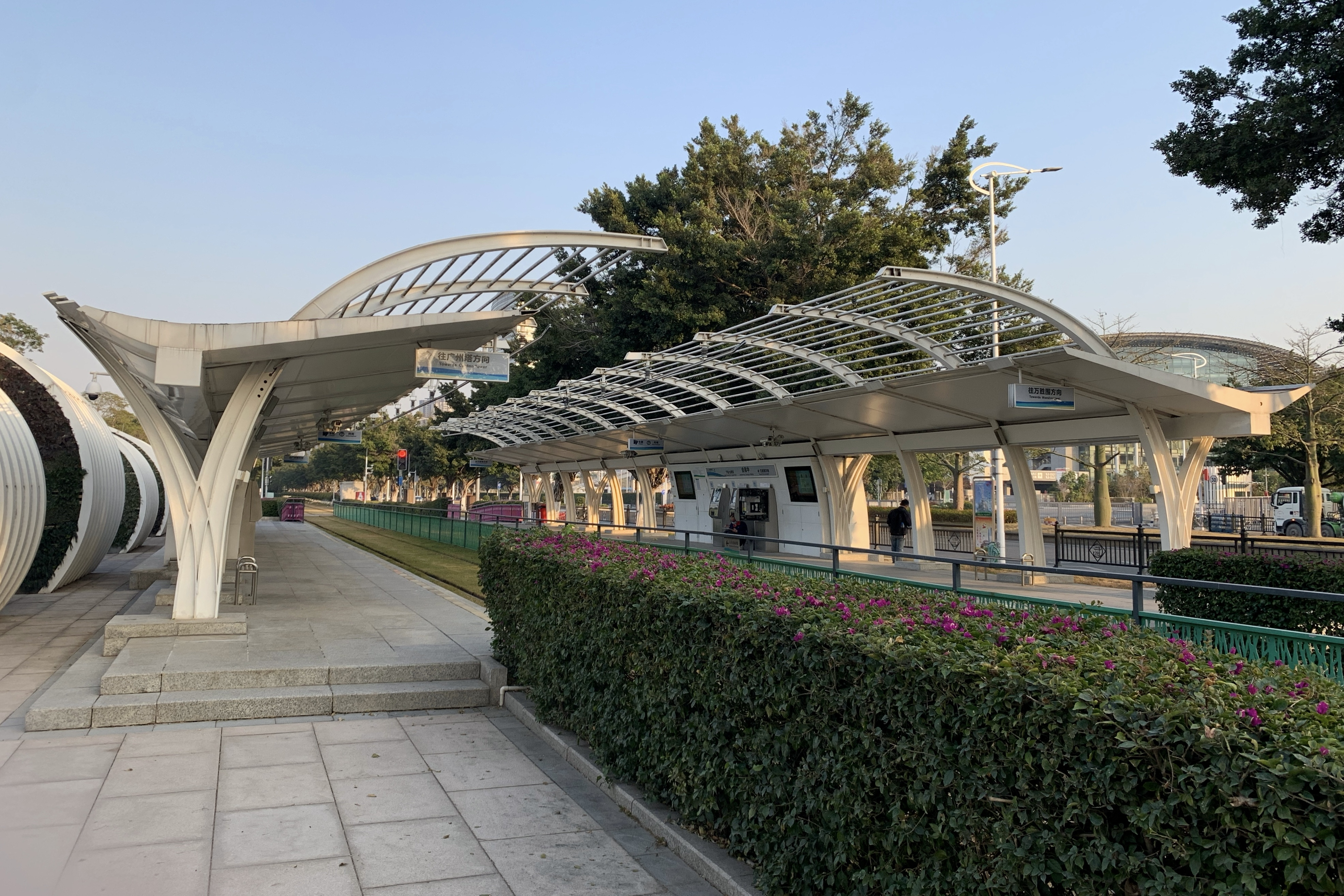

General information
- Location: Haizhu, Guangzhou, Guangdong; China
- Coordinates: 23.11°N 113.36°E
- Operated by: Guangzhou Metro Co. Ltd.
- Line: Haizhu Tram

Other information
- Station code: THZ106

History
- Opened: 31 December 2014

Services
Preceding station	Guangzhou Metro	Following station
Canton Fair Complex West towards Canton Tower	Haizhu Tram	Canton Fair Complex East towards Wanshengwei
Location

Canton Fair Complex Middle station (Chinese: 会展中站), is a station of Haizhu Tram of the Guangzhou Metro. It started operations on 31 December 2014.
