= Canton Fair Complex West station =

Haizhu Tram station in Guangzhou, China

Canton Fair Complex West 会展西
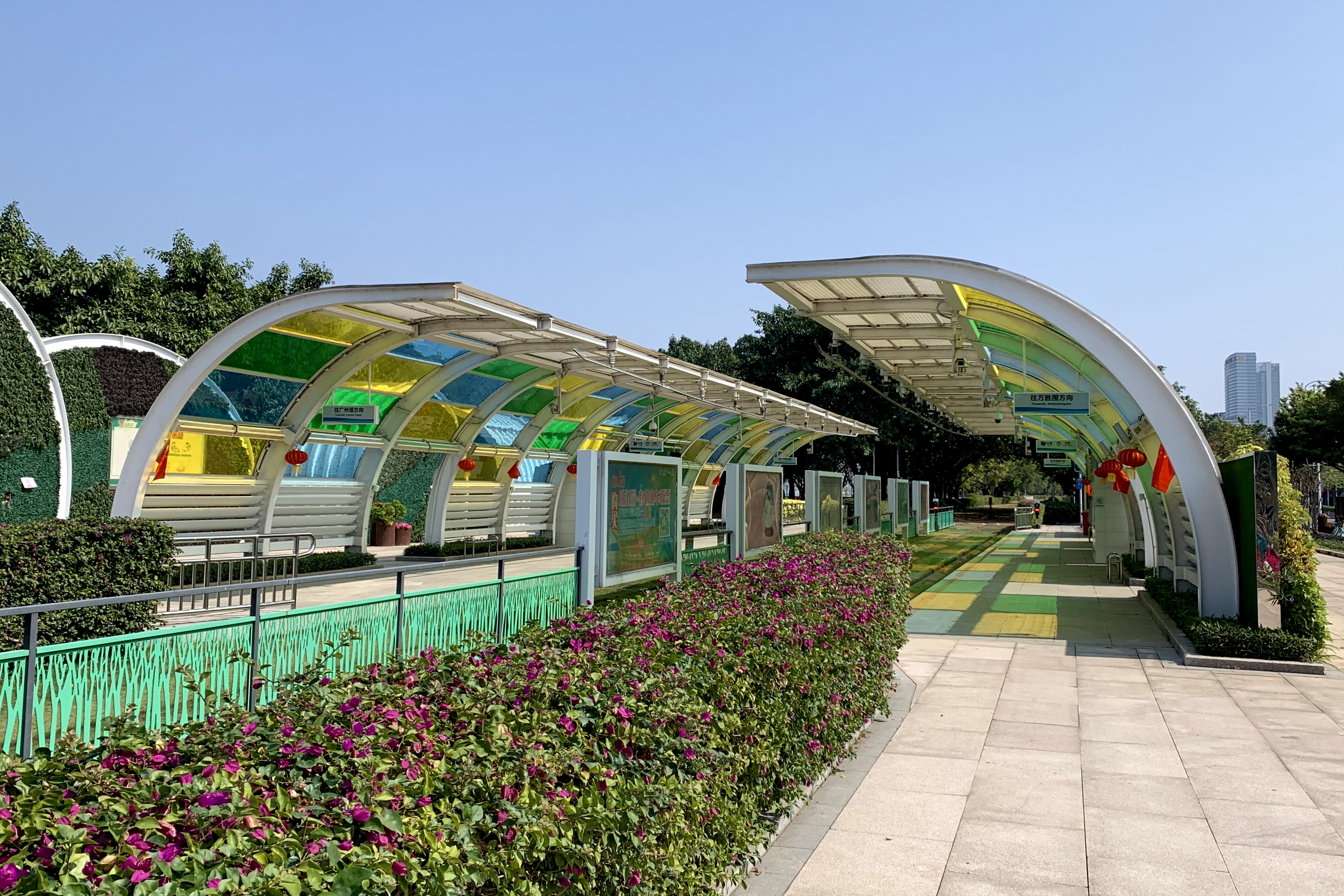

General information
- Location: Haizhu, Guangzhou, Guangdong, China
- Coordinates: 23.11°N 113.35°E
- Operated by: Guangzhou Metro Co. Ltd.
- Line: Haizhu Tram

Other information
- Status: suspended service
- Station code: THZ105

History
- Opened: 31 December 2014

Services
| Preceding station | Guangzhou Metro | Following station |
|---|---|---|
| Nanfeng towards Canton Tower | Haizhu Tram | Canton Fair Complex Middle towards Wanshengwei |
Location

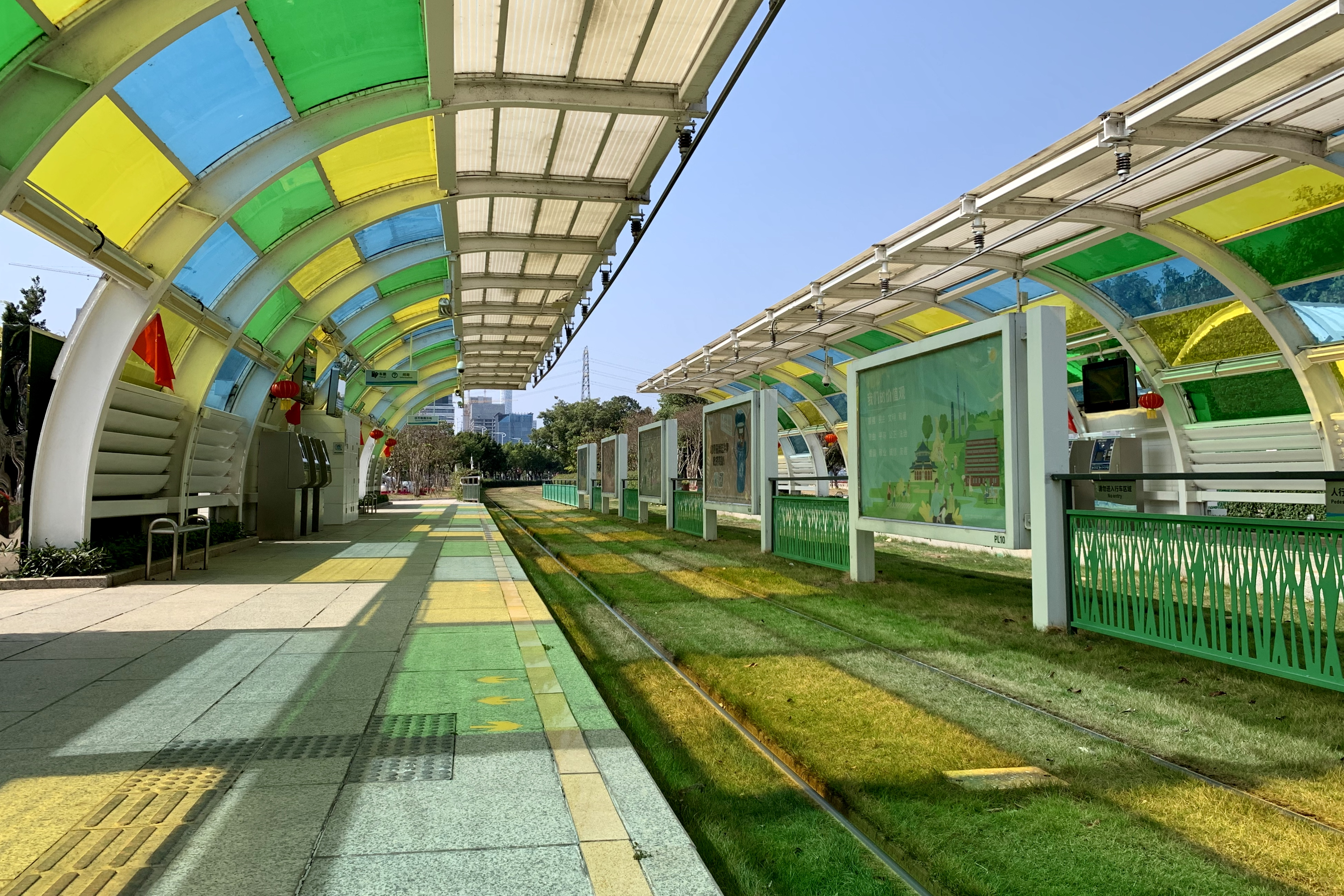
South Platform

Canton Fair Complex West station (Chinese: 会展西站) is a station of Haizhu Tram of the Guangzhou Metro. It started operations on 31 December 2014.

Due to construction of W. Huizhan road tunnel, Canton Fair Complex West station has suspended service since 17 May 2025, to allow moving of tram tracks and platforms.
