= Nanfeng station (Guangzhou Metro) =

Haizhu Tram station in Guangzhou

Nanfeng 南风
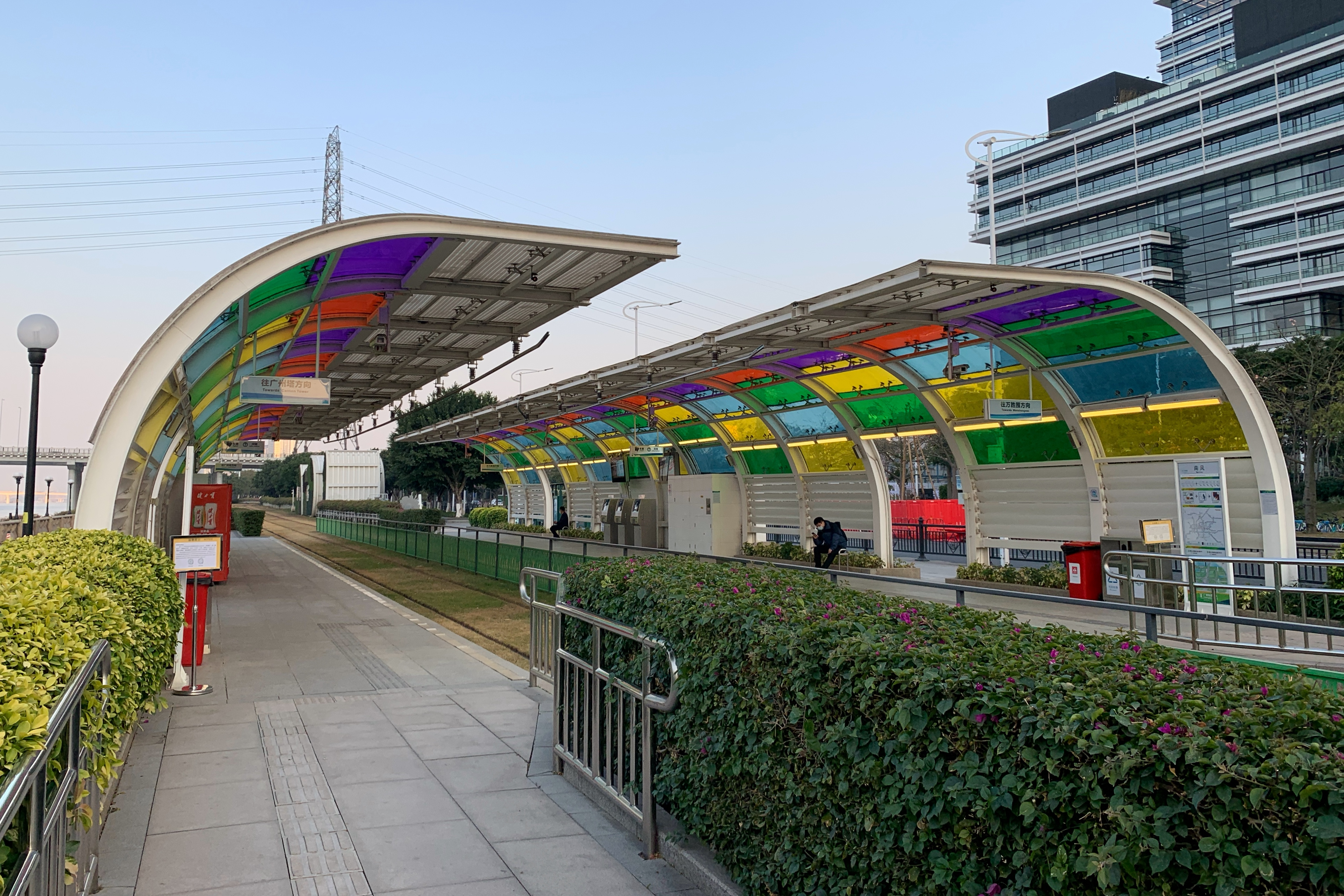

General information
- Location: Haizhu, Guangzhou, Guangdong; China
- Coordinates: 23.1083°N 113.3433°E
- Operated by: Guangzhou Metro Co. Ltd.
- Line: Haizhu Tram

Other information
- Station code: THZ104

History
- Opened: 31 December 2014

Services
Preceding station	Guangzhou Metro	Following station
Party Pier towards Canton Tower	Haizhu Tram	Canton Fair Complex West towards Wanshengwei
Location

Nanfeng station (Chinese: 南风站), is a station of Haizhu Tram of the Guangzhou Metro. It started operations on 31 December 2014.
