= Nanfeng station =

Nanfeng station may refer to:

- Nanfeng station (Guangzhou Metro), a light rail station in Guangzhou, China
- Nanfeng station (Hangzhou Metro), a metro station in Hangzhou, China
