= Pazhou Pagoda station =

Haizhu Tram station in Guangzhou

Pazhou Pagoda 琶洲塔
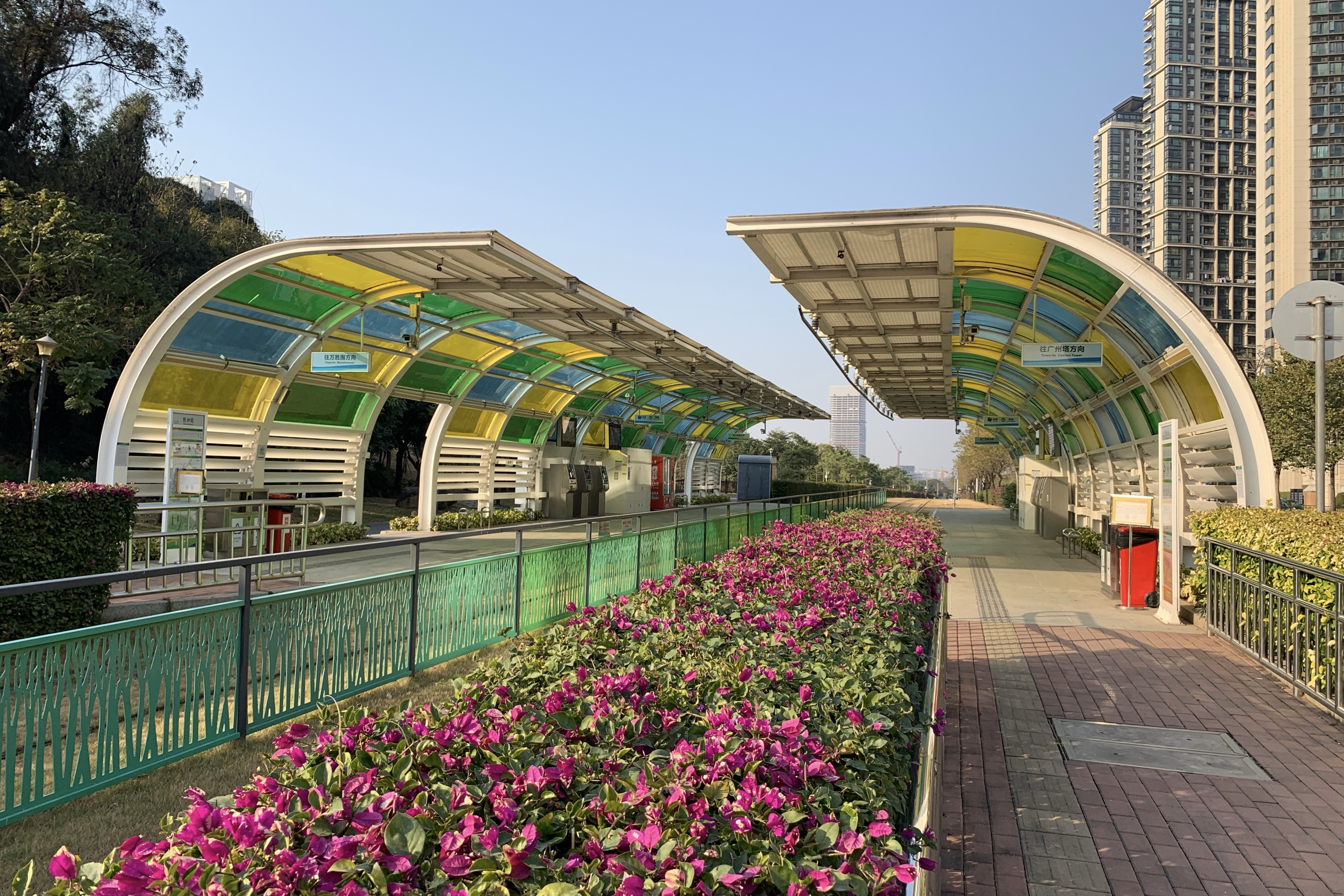

General information
- Location: Haizhu, Guangzhou, Guangdong; China
- Operated by: Guangzhou Metro Co. Ltd.
- Line: Haizhu Tram

Other information
- Station code: THZ109

History
- Opened: 31 December 2014

Services
Preceding station	Guangzhou Metro	Following station
Pazhou Bridge South towards Canton Tower	Haizhu Tram	Wanshengwei Terminus
Location

Pazhou Pagoda station (Chinese: 琶洲塔站), is a station of Haizhu Tram of the Guangzhou Metro. It started operations on 31 December 2014.
