= Haizhu Tram =

Tram system in Haizhu District, Guangzhou

Haizhu Island Circular New Tram
- THZ1
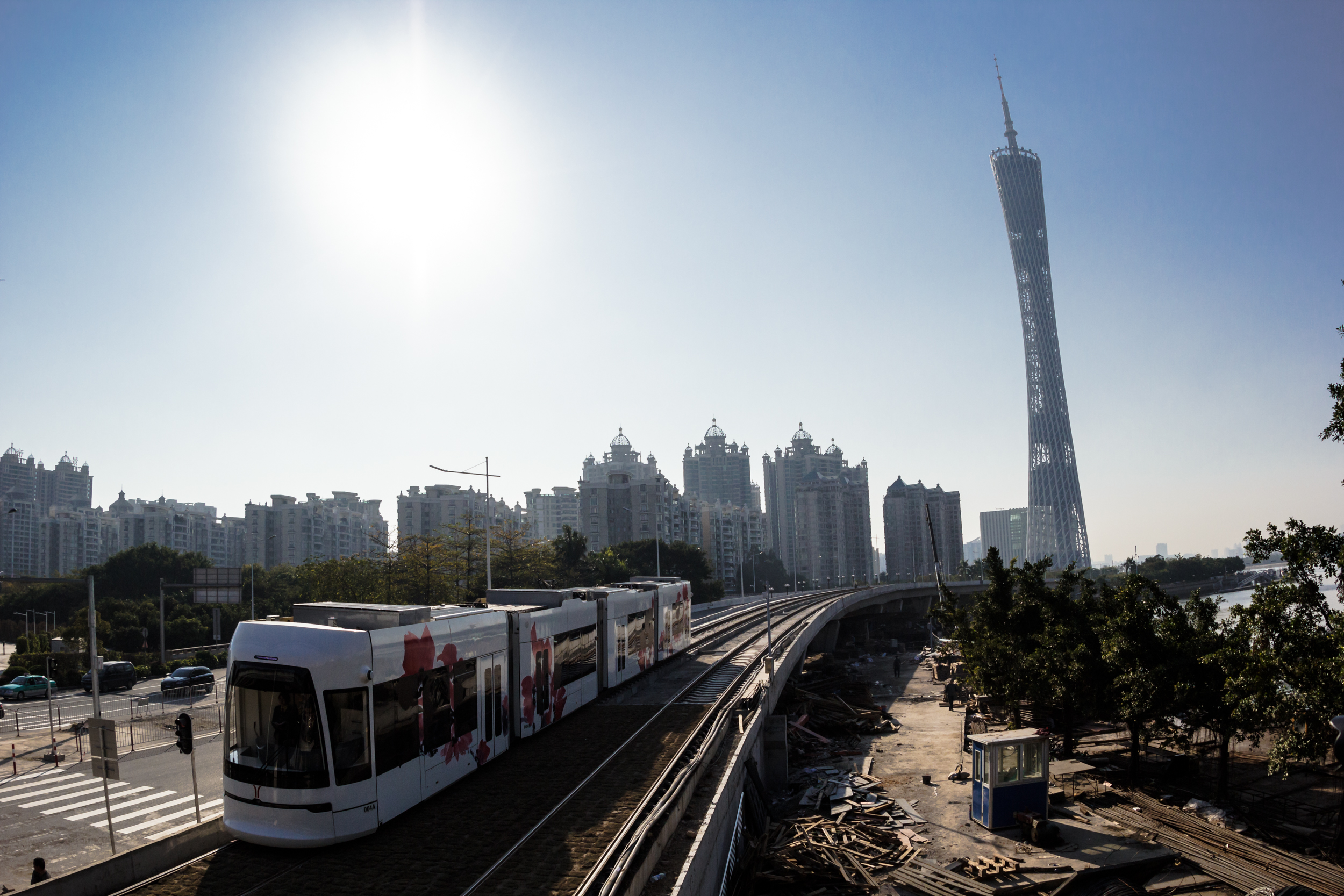

Overview
- Native name: 海珠环岛新型有轨电车
- Owner: City of Guangzhou
- Locale: Haizhu District, Guangzhou, Guangdong
- Termini: Canton Tower; Wanshengwei
- Stations: 9

Service
- Type: Tram
- System: Guangzhou Trams
- Services: 2
- Operator(s): Guangzhou Metro
- Depot(s): Modiesha Stabling Yard

History
- Opened: 31 December 2014; 10 years ago

Technical
- Line length: 6.9 km (4.3 mi)
- Number of tracks: 2
- Character: At-grade
- Track gauge: 1,435 mm (4 ft 8 1/2 in)
- Operating speed: 70 km/h (43 mph)
Route map

Haizhu Tram
- Simplified Chinese: 海珠环岛新型有轨电车
- Traditional Chinese: 海珠環島新型有軌電車
Transcriptions
Standard Mandarin
- Hanyu Pinyin: Hǎizhū Huándǎo Xīnxíng Yǒuguǐ Diànchē
Yue: Cantonese
- Jyutping: hoi^{2}zyu1 waan^{4}dou^{2} san^{1}jing^{4} jau^{5}gwai^{2} din^{6}ce^{1}

The Haizhu Island Circular New Tram (Chinese: 海珠环岛新型有轨电车) Line, also known as Haizhu Tram, THZ1, or YoungTram, is a tram system mainly serving the Haizhu District of Guangzhou, between Canton Tower and Wanshengwei. It is an at-grade tram system. The whole line (except Party Pier station) began operation on 31 December 2014. Party Pier station was added on 21 October 2015.

The Haizhu Tram is the first of the planned lines operated by Guangzhou Trams to open.

== Length and stations ==
The entire track of the first section of the Haizhu Tram, with a length of 6.9 km and all stations are laid at-grade.

Station No.	Station name		Connections	Distance km		Location
Station No.	English	Chinese	Connections	Distance km		Location
THZ101	Canton Tower	广州塔	3 309 APM APM01	–	0.0	Haizhu
THZ102	Liede Bridge South	猎德大桥南		0.90	0.90	Haizhu
THZ103	Party Pier	琶醍		0.44	1.34	Haizhu
THZ104	Nanfeng	南风		0.96	2.30	Haizhu
THZ105	Canton Fair Complex West (Closed until July 2026)	会展西		0.78	3.08	Haizhu
THZ106	Canton Fair Complex Middle	会展中		0.65	3.73	Haizhu
THZ107	Canton Fair Complex East	会展东		0.64	4.47	Haizhu
THZ108	Pazhou Bridge South	琶洲大桥南		0.68	5.05	Haizhu
THZ109	Pazhou Pagoda	琶洲塔		0.70	5.75	Haizhu
THZ110	Wanshengwei	万胜围	4 421 8 828	1.19	6.94	Haizhu

=== Former station ===
- THZ1-01 Canton Tower (old site), closed in 12 November 2024.

== See also ==
- Guangzhou Tram
