= Liede Bridge =

Bridge in Guangzhou, Guangdong, China

Liede Bridge 猎德大桥
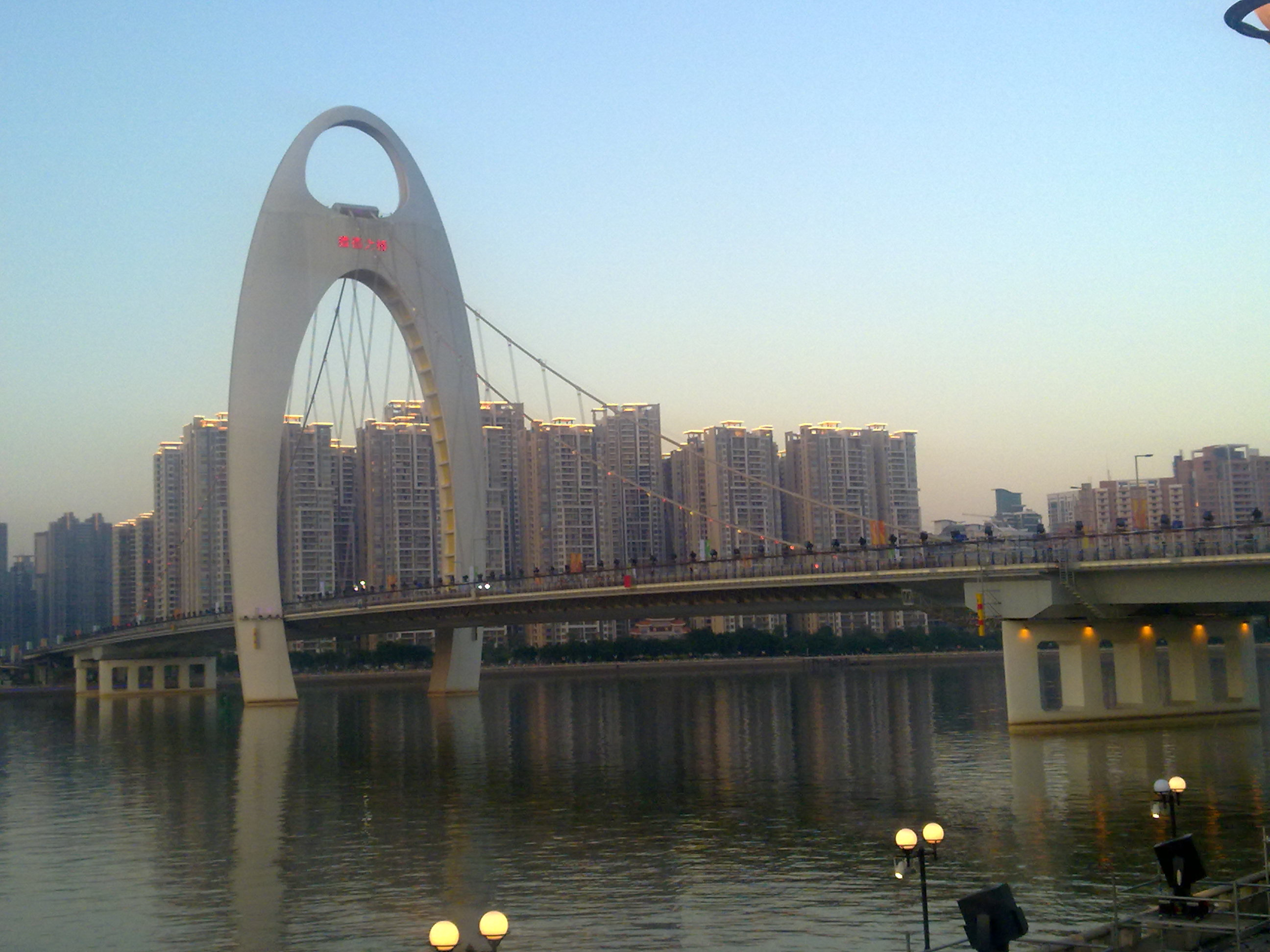
- Coordinates: 23°06′43″N 113°19′43″E
- Carries: 6 lanes of traffic on Liede Avenue
- Crosses: Pearl River
- Locale: Guangzhou, Guangdong, China

Characteristics
- Design: Suspension bridge
- Total length: 4.3 kilometres (2.7 mi)
- Longest span: 219 metres (719 ft)

History
- Opened: 31 July 2009

Location
- Interactive map of Liede Bridge

Liede Bridge (Chinese: 猎德大桥) is a bridge crossing over the Pearl River in Guangzhou, Guangdong, China. The 4.3 kilometres (2.7 mi) bridge connects Pazhou Island in Haizhu District with Tianhe District and opened in 2009.
