= Wanshengwei station =

Guangzhou Metro interchange station

Coordinates: 23°05′52″N 113°23′05″E

Wanshengwei 万胜围
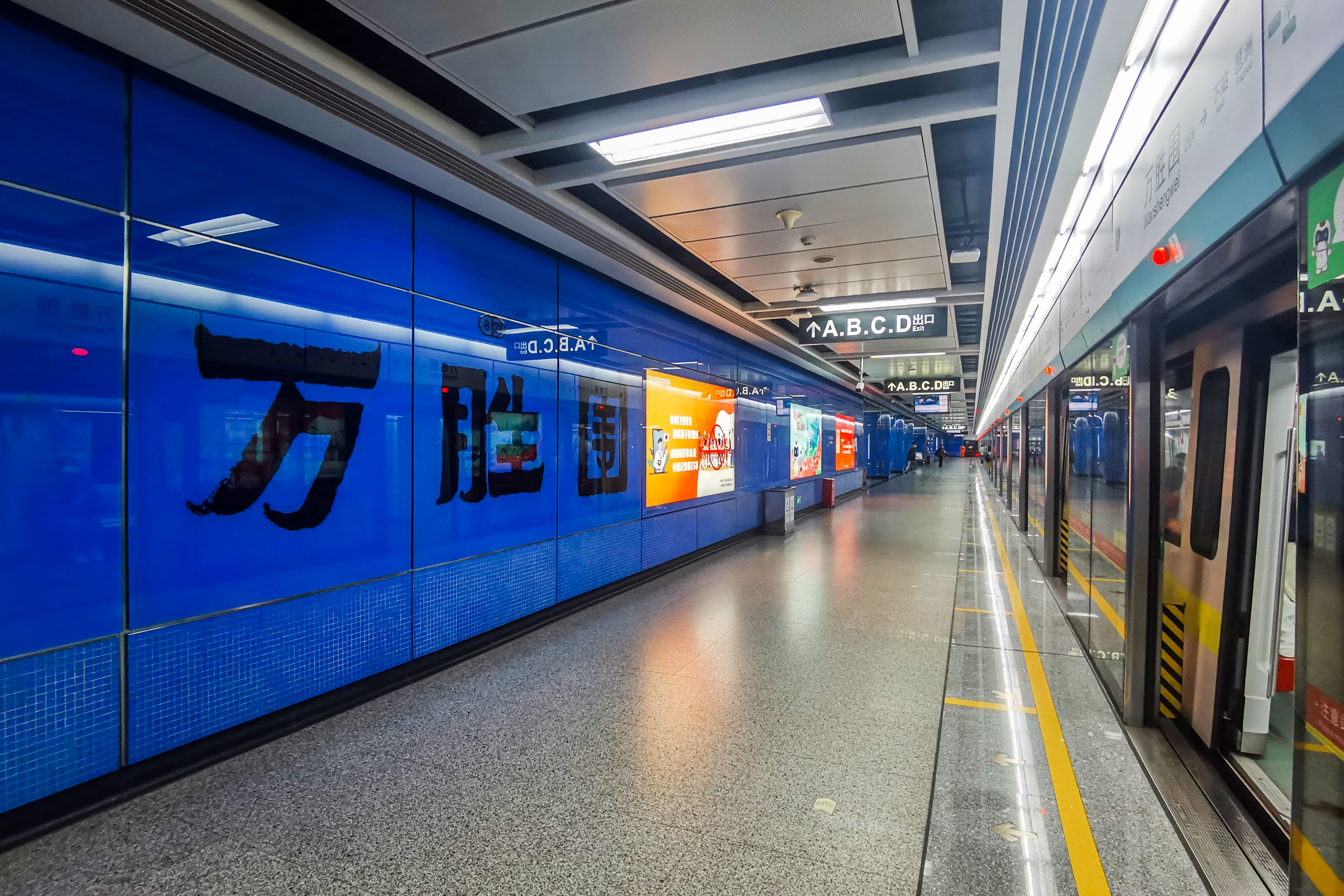
- Platform 3 (Line 8 originating platform)

Chinese name
- Simplified Chinese: 万胜围站
- Traditional Chinese: 萬勝圍站
- Literal meaning: Walled Village of a Myriad Victories Station
Transcriptions
Standard Mandarin
- Hanyu Pinyin: Wànshèngwéi Zhàn
Yue: Cantonese
- Yale Romanization: Màahnsing'wàih Jaahm
- Jyutping: Maan^{6}sing^{3}wai^{4} Zaam^{6}
- Hong Kong Romanization: Man Shing Wai station

General information
- Location: Haizhu District, Guangzhou, Guangdong; China
- Operated by: Guangzhou Metro Co. Ltd.
- Lines: Line 4; Line 8; Haizhu Tram
- Platforms: 6 (1 island platform and 4 side platforms)
- Tracks: 6

Construction
- Structure type: Underground (Lines 4 & 8); At-grade (Haizhu Tram)
- Accessible: Yes

Other information
- Station code: 421 828 THZ110

History
- Opened: 26 December 2005; 20 years ago (Line 4/Line 8); 31 December 2014; 11 years ago (Haizhu Tram)

Services
Preceding station	Guangzhou Metro	Following station
Chebeinan towards Huangcun	Line 4	Guanzhou towards Nansha Passenger Port
Pazhou towards Jiaoxin	Line 8	Terminus
Pazhou Pagoda towards Canton Tower	Haizhu Tram	Terminus
Location

Wanshengwei Station (simplified Chinese: 万胜围站; traditional Chinese: 萬勝圍站; Cantonese Yale: Màahnsing'wàih Jaahm) is an interchange station between Line 4 and Line 8 of the Guangzhou Metro, and also the eastern terminus of Line 8. It started operations on 26 December 2005. It is an underground station and located near the junction of Xingang East Road (新港东路) and Xinjiao South Road (新滘南路) in Haizhu District.

This station, like the others on Line 8 (except Changgang station, Baogang Dadao station, Shayuan station, and Fenghuang Xincun station, which were added after the dividing of Line 2), ran as part of a single route with the current Line 2 until the extension to both lines opened in late 2010.

The station is also the eastern terminus of the Haizhu Tram line of the Guangzhou Trams, which runs to Canton Tower Tram station.

== Station layout ==
G (Tram); Platforms	-	Exits
G (Tram); Platforms	Side platform, doors will open on the right
G (Tram); Platforms	Platform 1	THZ1 termination platform
G (Tram); Platforms	Platform 2	THZ1 towards Canton Tower (Pazhou Pagoda)
G (Tram); Platforms	Side platform, doors will open on the right
G (Tram); Platforms	-	Exits
G (Metro)	-	Exits
L1; Concourse & Platforms	North Lobby	Ticket Machines, Customer Service, Police Station, Safety Facilities
L1; Concourse & Platforms	Side platform, doors will open on the right
L1; Concourse & Platforms	Platform 3	8 towards Jiaoxin (Pazhou)
L1; Concourse & Platforms	Platform 4	8 termination platform
L1; Concourse & Platforms	Side platform, doors will open on the right
L1; Concourse & Platforms	South Lobby	Ticket Machines, Customer Service, Police Station, Safety Facilities
L2; Platforms	Platform 2	4 towards Nansha Passenger Port (Guanzhou)
L2; Platforms	Island Platform, doors will open on the left
L2; Platforms	Platform 1	4 towards Huangcun (Chebeinan)
L2; Platforms	Passageway	Passageway between North & South Lobbies

== Exits ==
Exit number	Exit location
Exit A	Guangzhou Metro Corporation
Exit B	Xingang Donglu, Haizhu Tram
Exit C	Xingang Donglu, Haizhu Tram
Exit D	Xingang Donglu

== Gallery ==
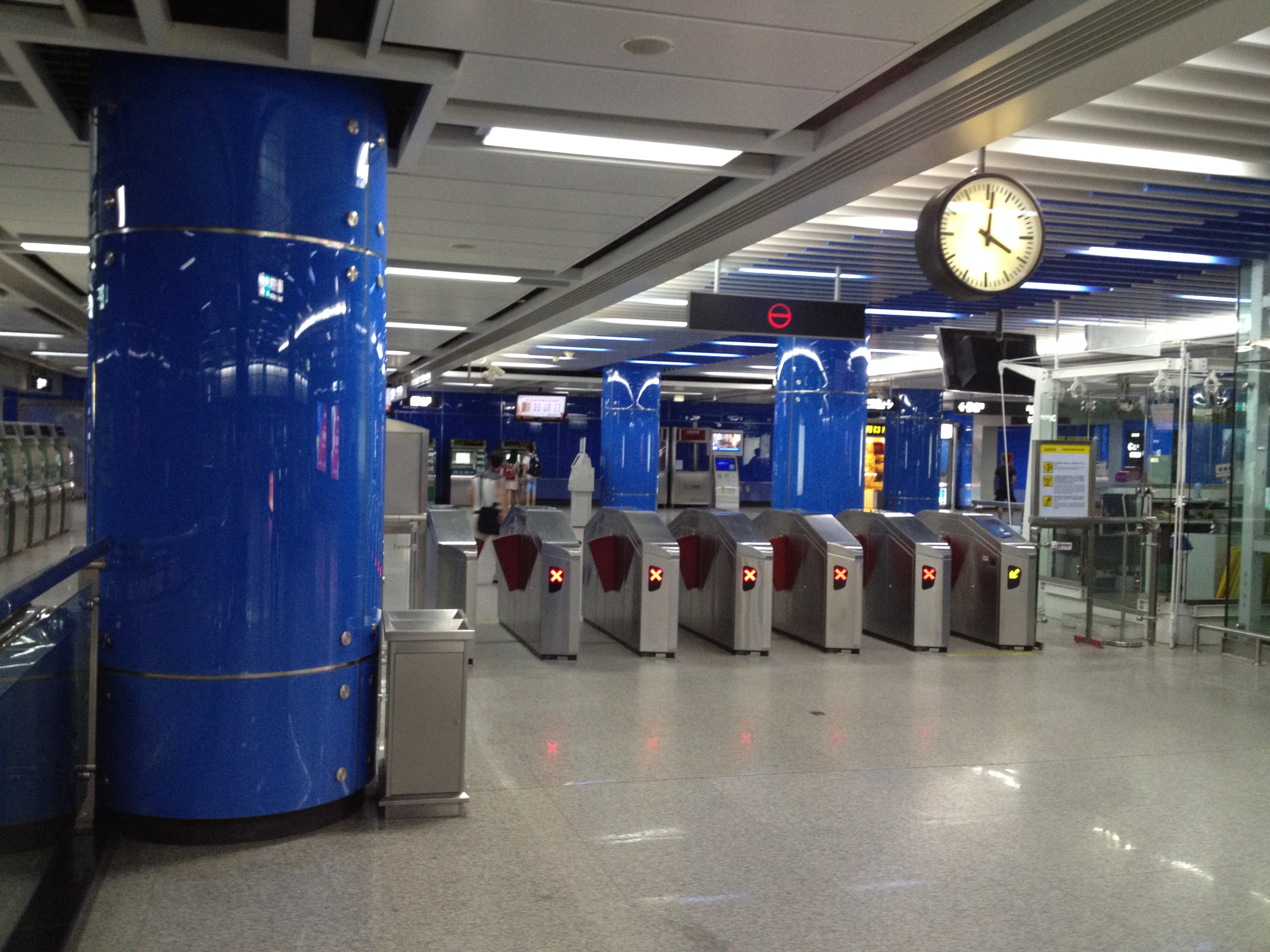
North concourse

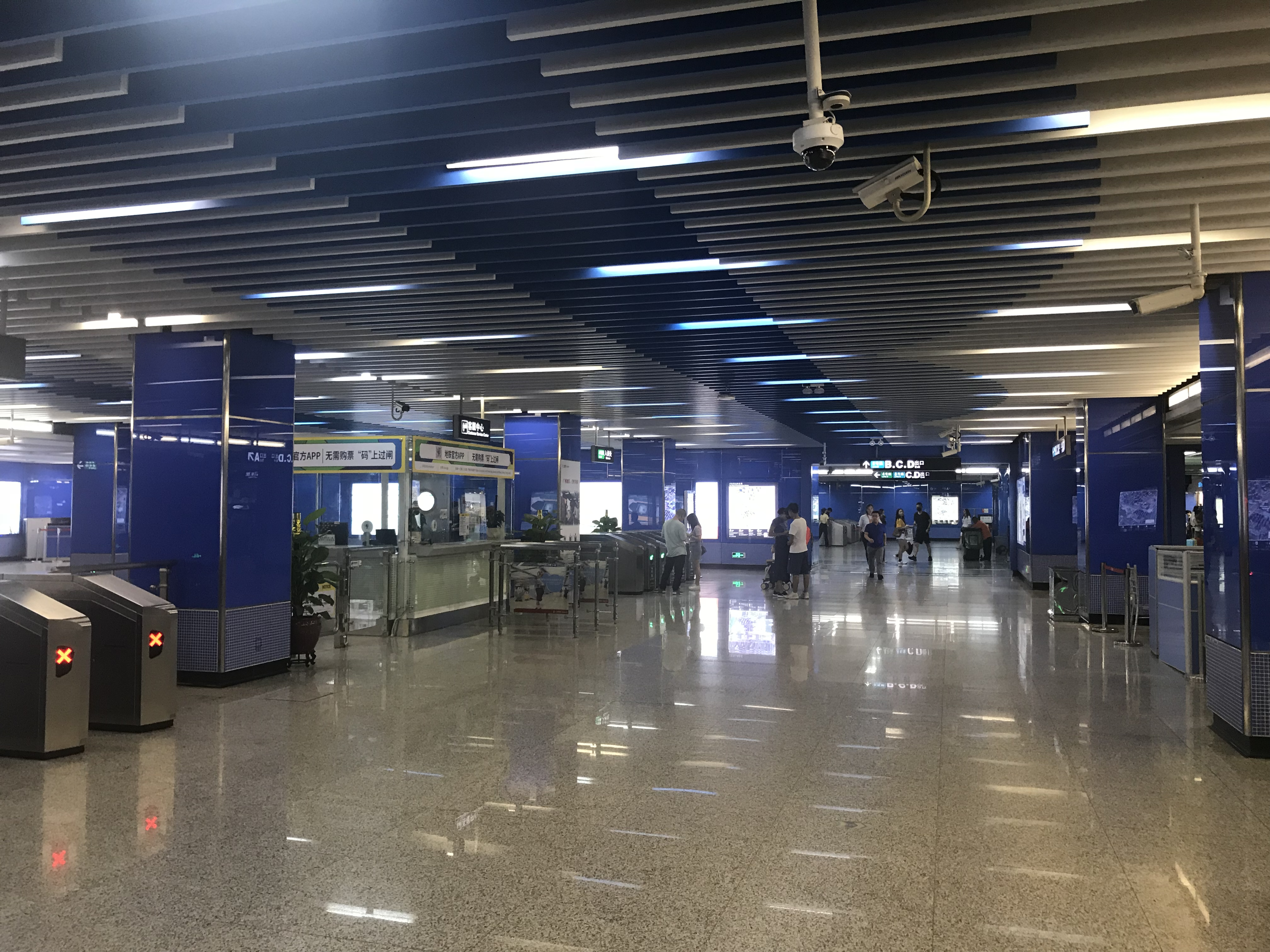
South concourse

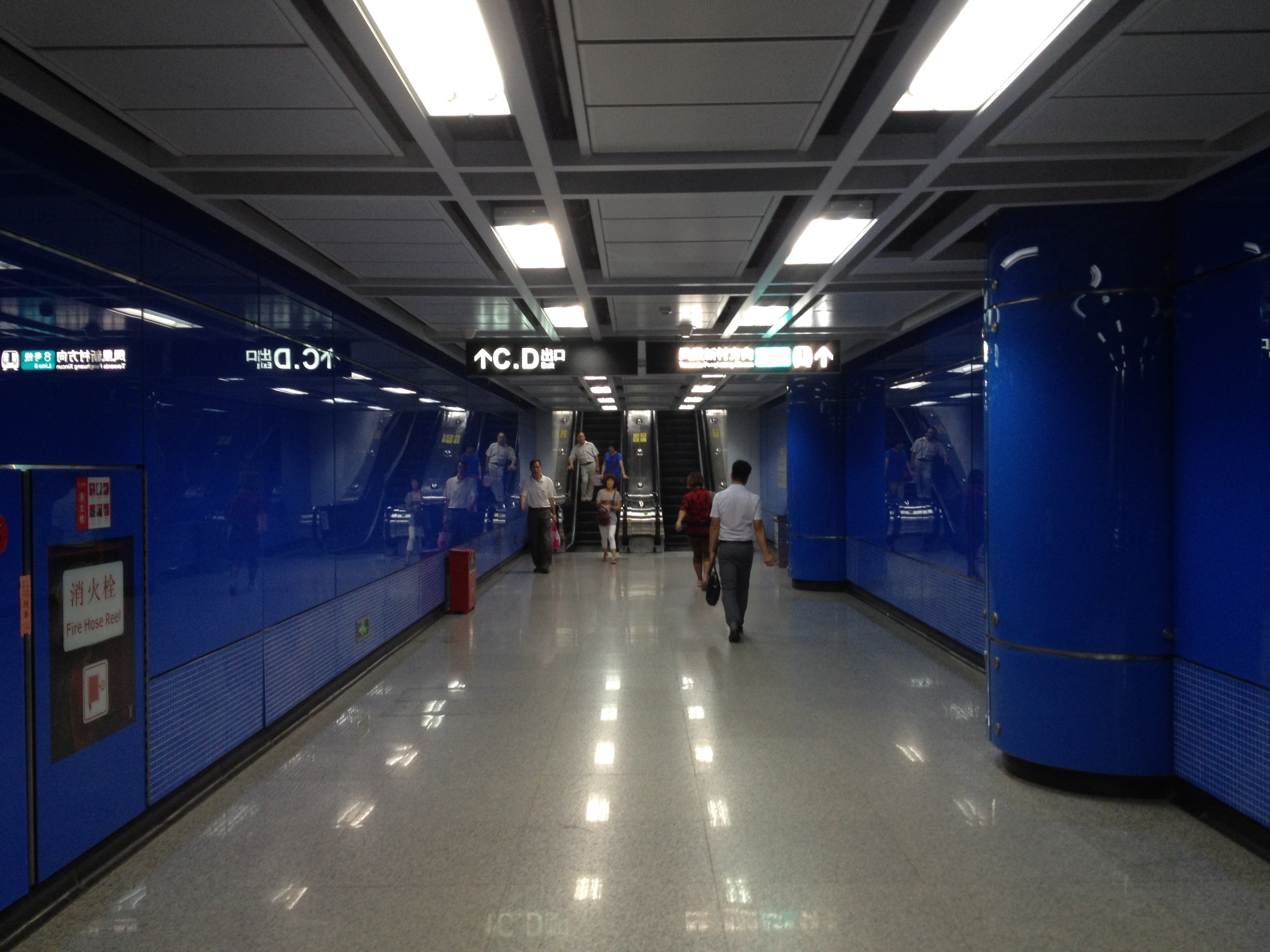
Concourse passageway

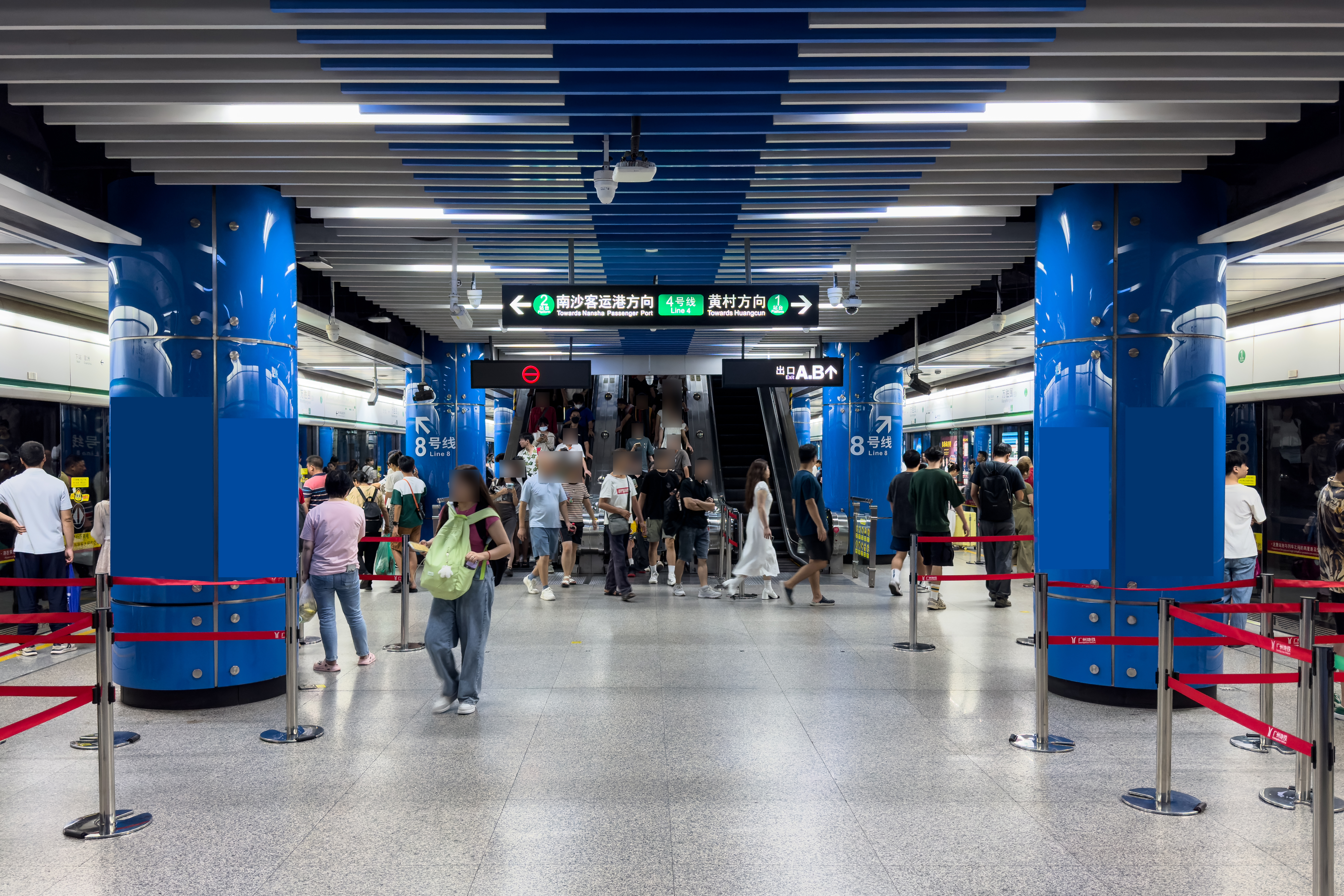
Line 4 platform
