= Canton Tower station (Haizhu Tram) =

Haizhu Tram station in Guangzhou, China

Canton Tower 广州塔
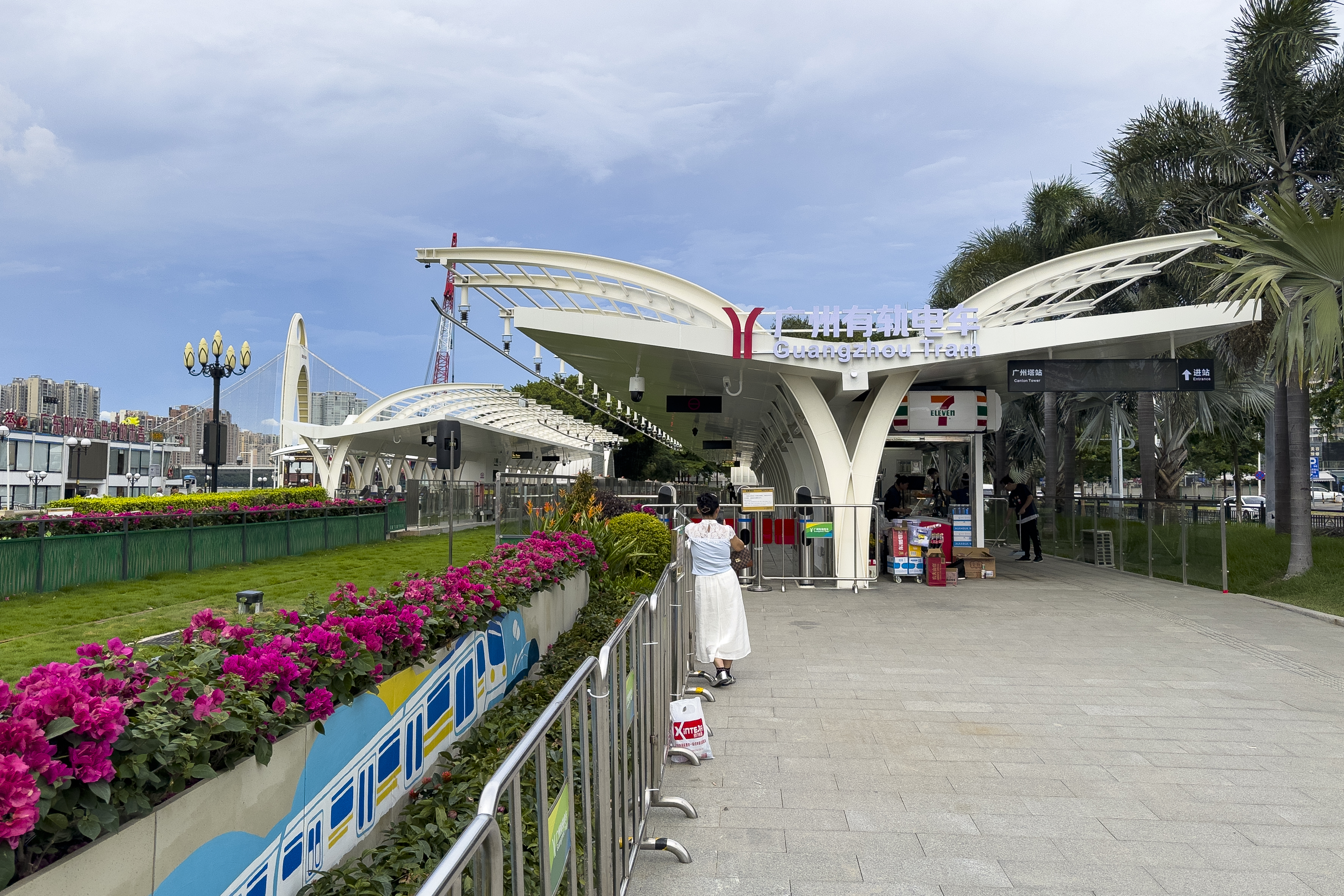

General information
- Location: Haizhu, Guangzhou, Guangdong; China
- Coordinates: 23.1100694°N 113.3214618°E
- Operated by: Guangzhou Metro Co. Ltd.
- Line: Haizhu Tram

Construction
- Structure type: At-grade

Other information
- Station code: THZ101

History
- Opened: 31 December 2014; 11 years ago 1 July 2025 (rebuild)
- Closed: 12 November 2024; 17 months ago

Services
Preceding station	Guangzhou Metro	Following station
Terminus	Haizhu Tram	Liede Bridge South towards Wanshengwei
Location

Canton Tower station (Chinese: 广州塔站), formerly Canton Tower East station (广州塔东), is a station of Haizhu Tram of the Guangzhou Metro. It started operations on 31 December 2014. The station was closed for renovation on 12 November 2024 and reopened on 1 July 2025 as the new western terminus of the line.

== Station layout ==
G Platforms	-	Exits
G Platforms	Side platform, doors will open on the right
G Platforms	Platform 1	THZ1 towards Wanshengwei (Liede Bridge South)
G Platforms	Platform 2	THZ1 termination platform
G Platforms	Side platform, doors will open on the right
G Platforms	-	Exits
