= Ruyifang station =

Guangzhou Metro Line 6 and Line 11 station

Ruyifang 如意坊
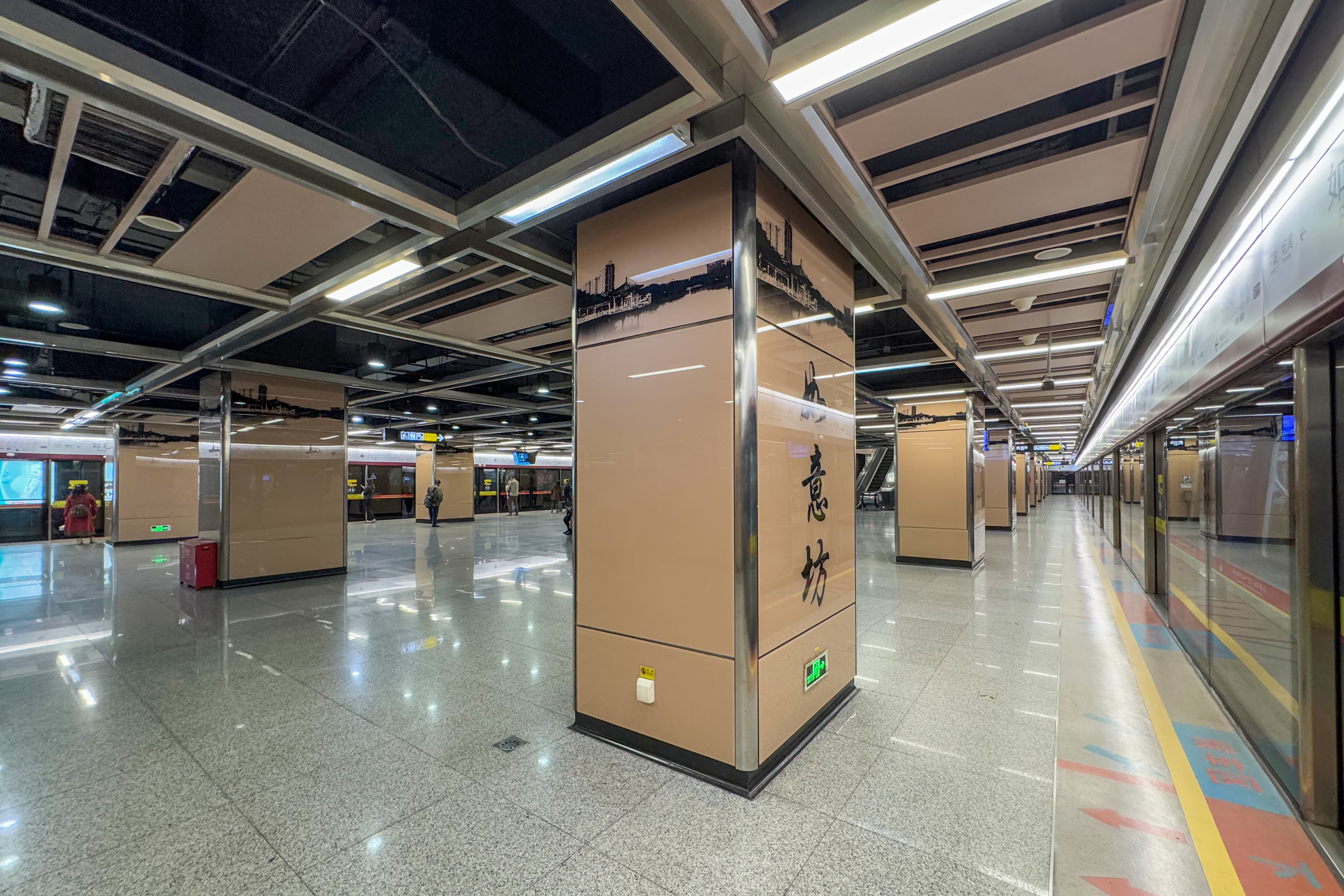
- Line 6 platform

Chinese name
- Chinese: 如意坊站
Transcriptions
Standard Mandarin
- Hanyu Pinyin: Rúyìfāng Zhàn
Yue: Cantonese
- Yale Romanization: Yùhyífōng Jaahm
- Jyutping: Jyu^{4}ji^{3}fong^{1} Zaam^{6}

General information
- Location: West of intersection of Huangsha Avenue (黄沙大道) and Duobao Road (多宝路), Changhua Subdistrict; Liwan District, Guangzhou, Guangdong; China
- Coordinates: 23°7′4.1052″N 113°13′32.5646″E
- Operator: Guangzhou Metro Co. Ltd.
- Lines: Line 6; Line 11
- Platforms: 4 (2 island platforms)
- Tracks: 4

Construction
- Structure type: Underground
- Accessible: Yes

Other information
- Station code: 606 1118

History
- Opened: Line 6: 28 December 2013 (12 years ago); Line 11: 28 December 2024 (19 months ago)

Services
Preceding station	Guangzhou Metro	Following station
Tanwei towards Xunfenggang	Line 6	Huangsha towards Xiangxue
Shiweitang Outer Circle	Line 11	Zhongshanba Inner Circle
Location

Ruyifang Station (Chinese: 如意坊站; pinyin: Rúyìfāng Zhàn; Cantonese Yale: Yùhyífōng Jaahm) is an interchange station between Line 6 and Line 11 of the Guangzhou Metro. It is located underground in the Liwan District of Guangzhou. It started operations on 28 December 2013. The Line 11 station opened on 28 December 2024.

== Construction incident ==
In the 03:00 hour of 5 October 2007, as the Ruyifang station was being dug up, water from an unidentified source covered a 300 m^{2} (3,200 sq ft) area of the construction site was submerged to a depth of 5 to 6 m (16 to 20 ft). No injuries were reported, and by 06:30 on 6 October, the previously submerged portion was re-sealed.

After the incident, the original split platforms design for Line 6 were re-designed into a full-width island platform, but they had to maintain the original width due to the construction of the siding near the station had completed. This 23m-wide platform once made it the widest platform of the whole line and the metro network, until it was overtaken in 2020 by Hualinsi Buddhist Temple of Line 8 (the middle part of the platform is around 26m wide).

== Station layout ==
G	-	Exits A, B, C2, E
L1; Transfer level	-	Towards concourse and exits
L1; Transfer level	-	Station Equipment, Security Facilities (Exit E)
L2	Exit D transfer level	Towards L3 transfer level and L4 concourse
L2	Transfer level	Towards concourse and exits, Reserved for commercial use
L3	Exit D transfer level	Towards Exits D1, D2 and L2 transfer level
L3	Transfer level	Towards concourse and exits, Reserved for commercial use
L4; Concourse	Lobby	Ticket Machines, Customer Service, Shops, Police Station, Baby Change, Security Facilities
L5; 11 Platforms	Platform 3	11 Outer Circle (Shiweitang)
L5; 11 Platforms	Island platform, doors will open on the left (Toilets, Nursery)
L5; 11 Platforms	Platform 4	11 Inner Circle (Zhongshanba)
L5; 11 Platforms	Attic	Toilet, Transfer passageway between Lines 6 & 11
L6; 6 Platforms	Platform 2	6 towards Xunfenggang (Tanwei)
L6; 6 Platforms	Island platform, doors will open on the left
L6; 6 Platforms	Platform 1	6 towards Xiangxue (Huangsha)

=== Entrances/exits ===
The station has 5 points of entry/exit, in which Exits A and B opened with the station's initial opening. When Line 11 opened, Exits D1, D2 and E opened. Exit A is equipped with an elevator, and Exit B is equipped with a stairlift.

Although there is an elevator next to Exit A, because most of the station space is divided into public areas, the space in the station equipment area is limited, so Exit A cannot be equipped with a direct elevator to the concourse on the fourth basement floor, and only two elevators can be set up separately.

- A: Huangsha Avenue
- B: Huangsha Avenue
- ~~C2~~: (Under construction)
- D1: Duobao Road, Liwan Lake Park, The Third Affiliated Hospital of Guangzhou Medical University
- D2: Duobao Road
- E: Huangsha Avenue
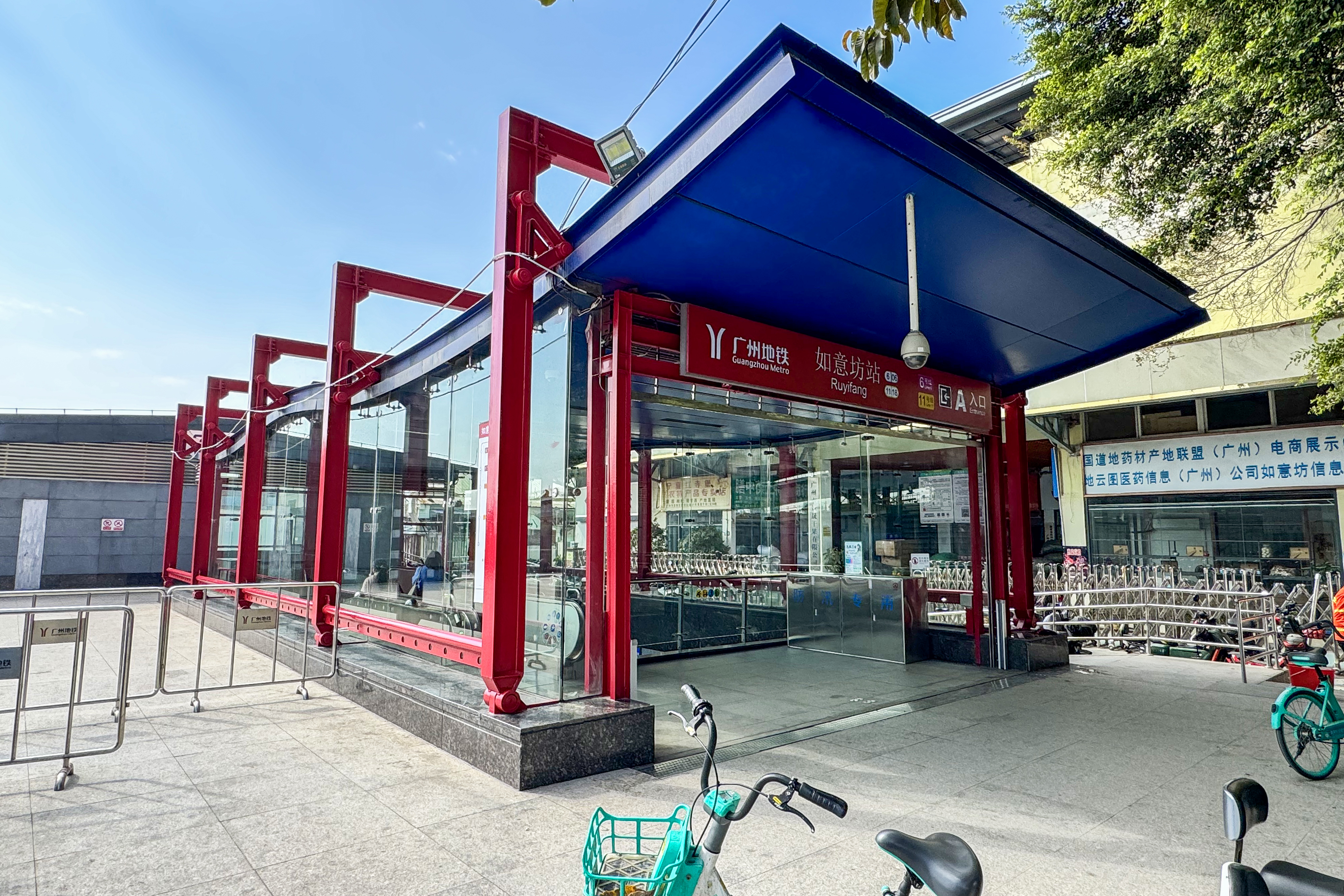
Entrance A

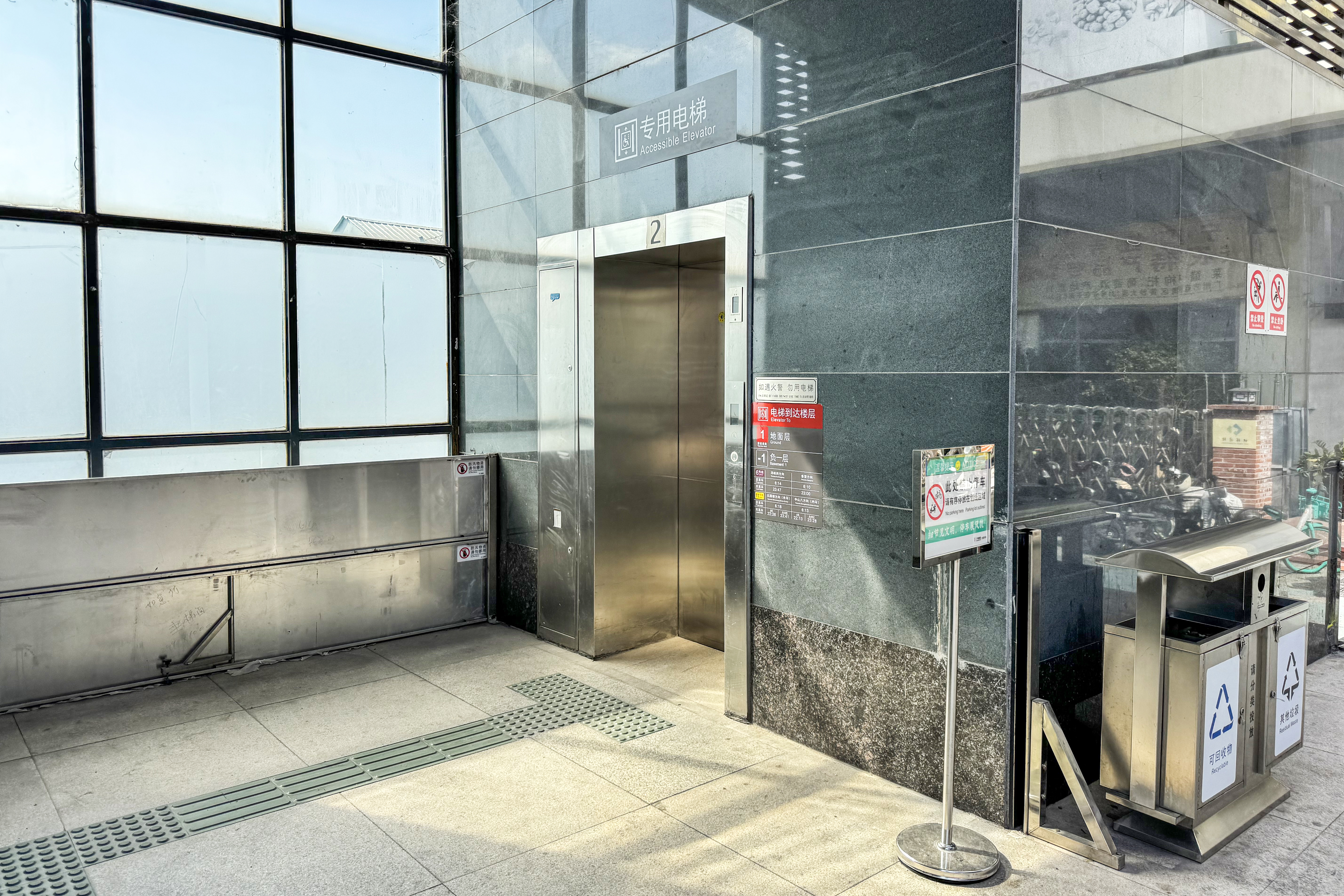
Elevator of Entrance A

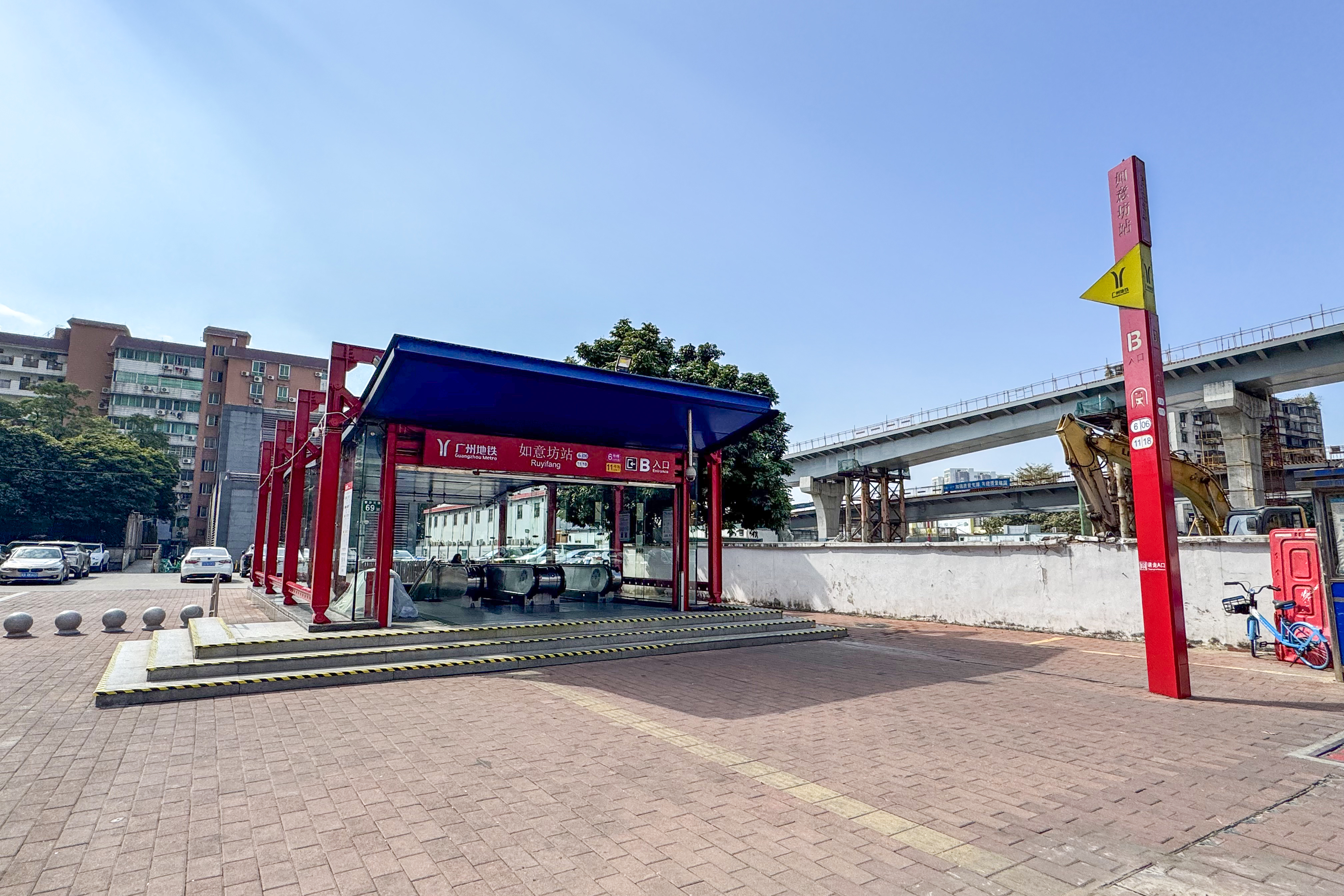
Entrance B

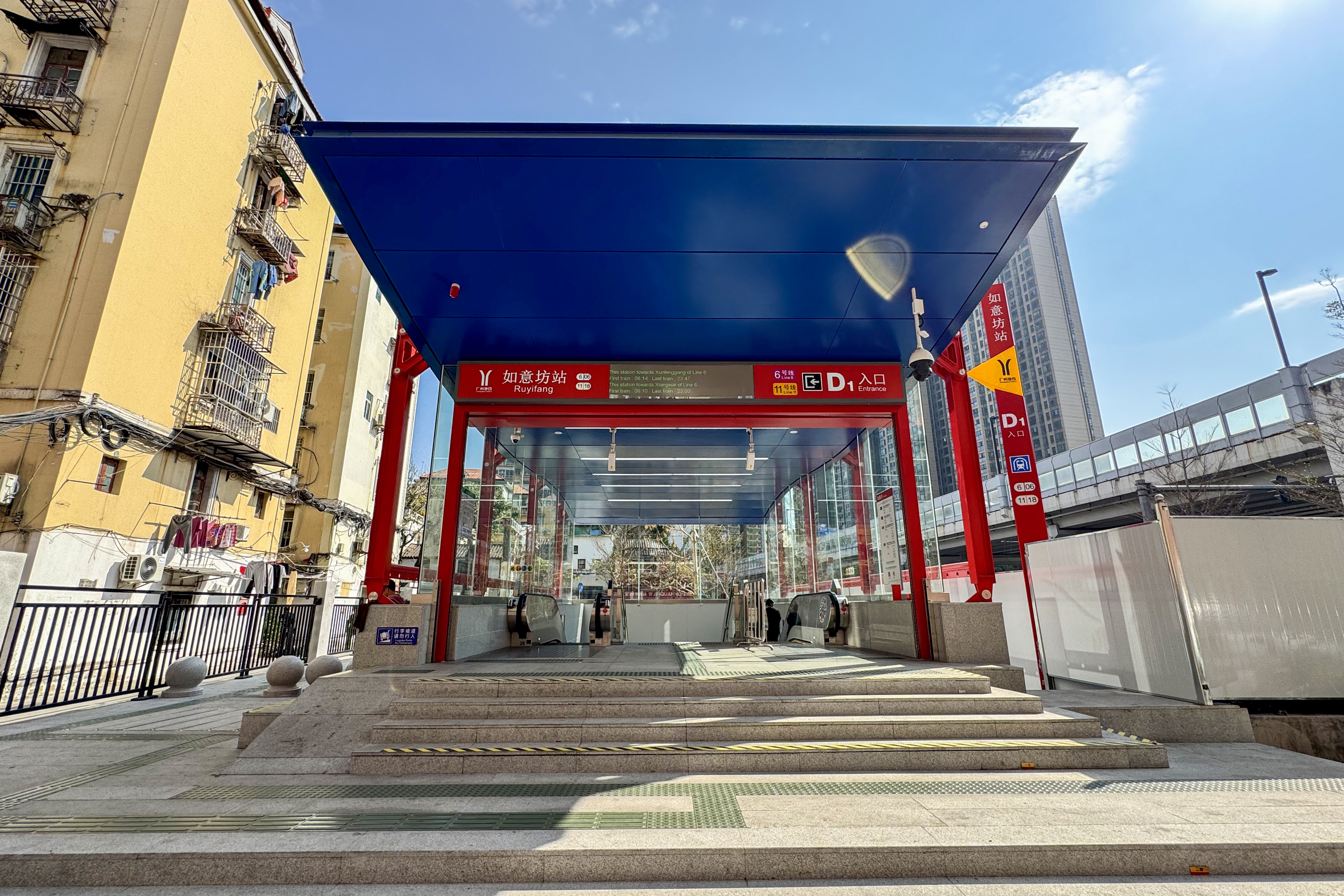
Entrance D1

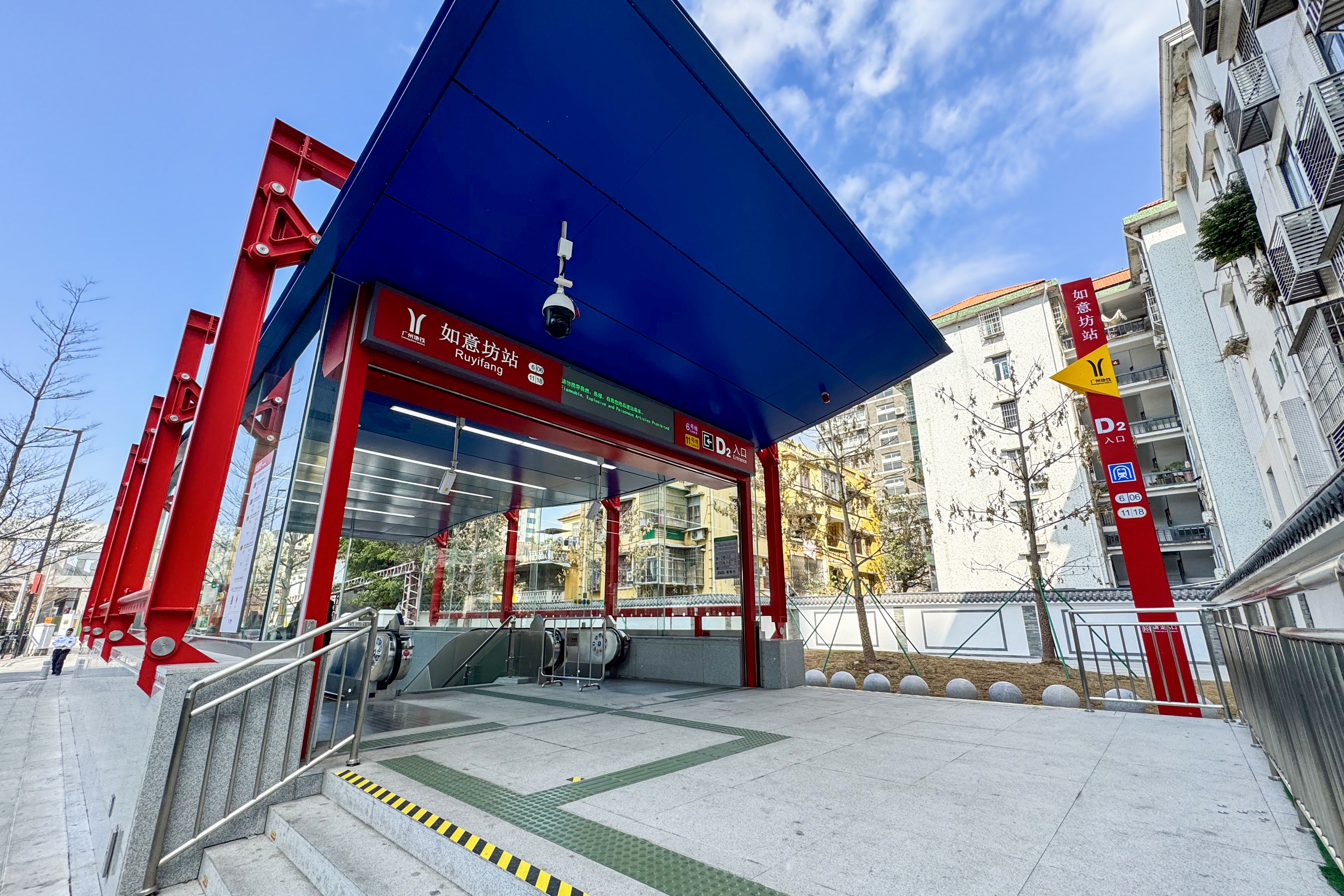
Entrance D2

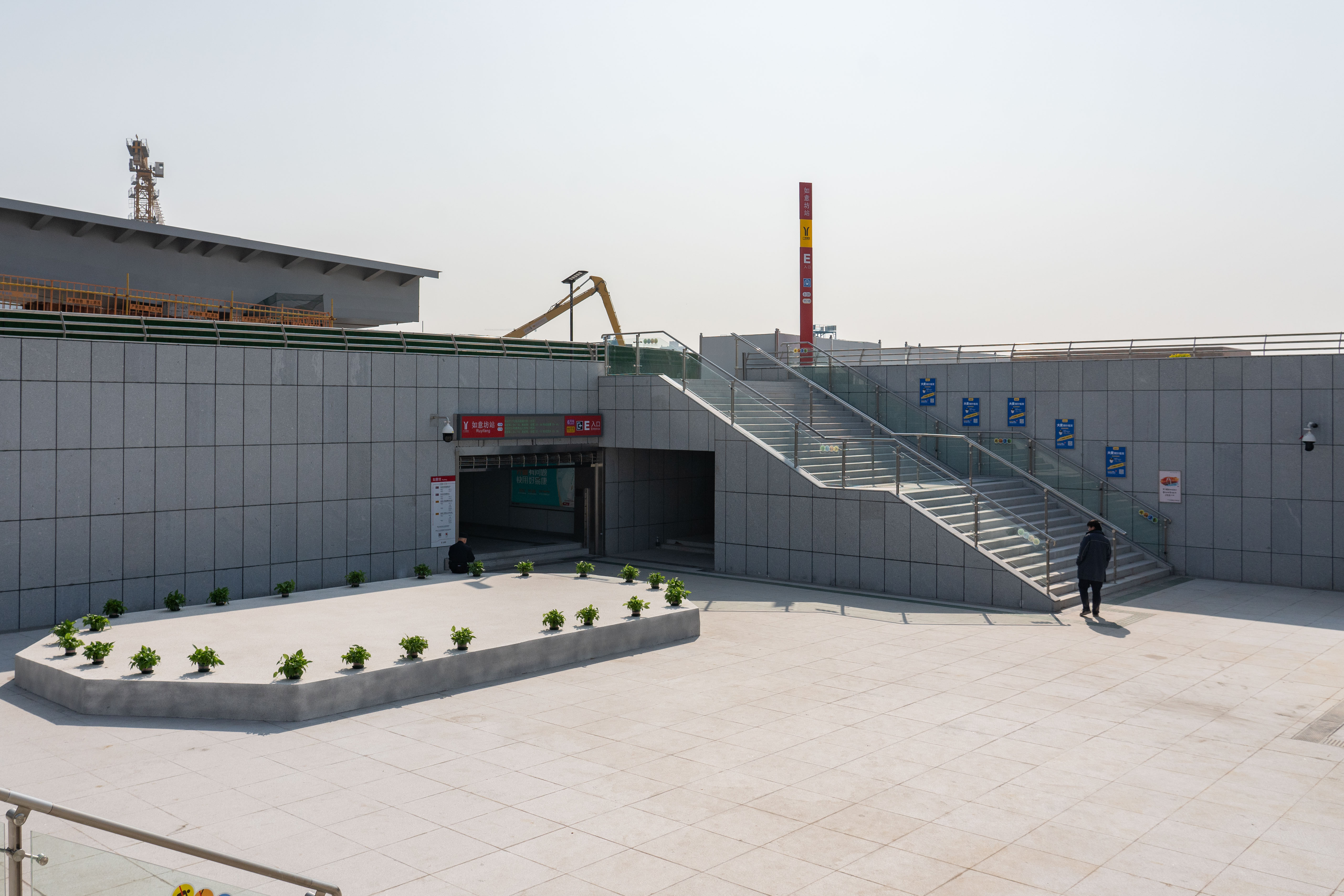
Entrance E

== Gallery ==
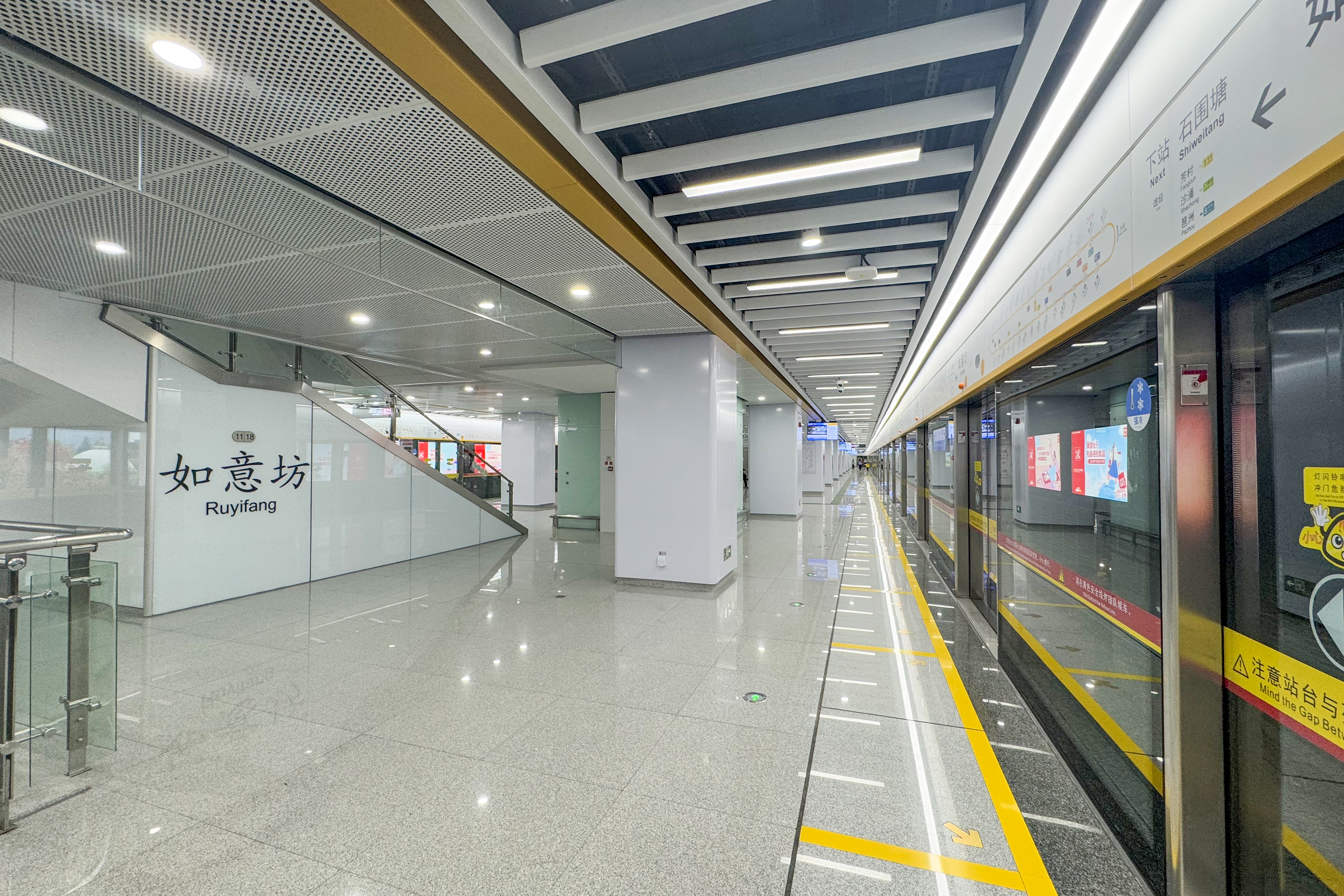
Line 11 platform 3 (Outer Circle platform)

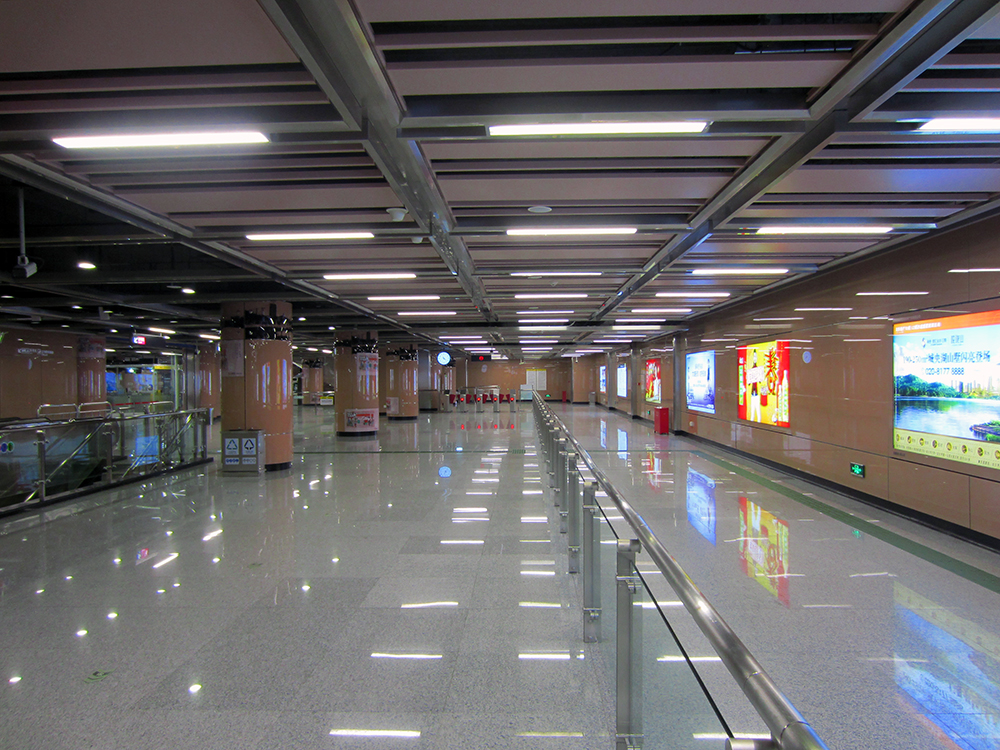
Line 6 concourse (prior to Line 11 opening)

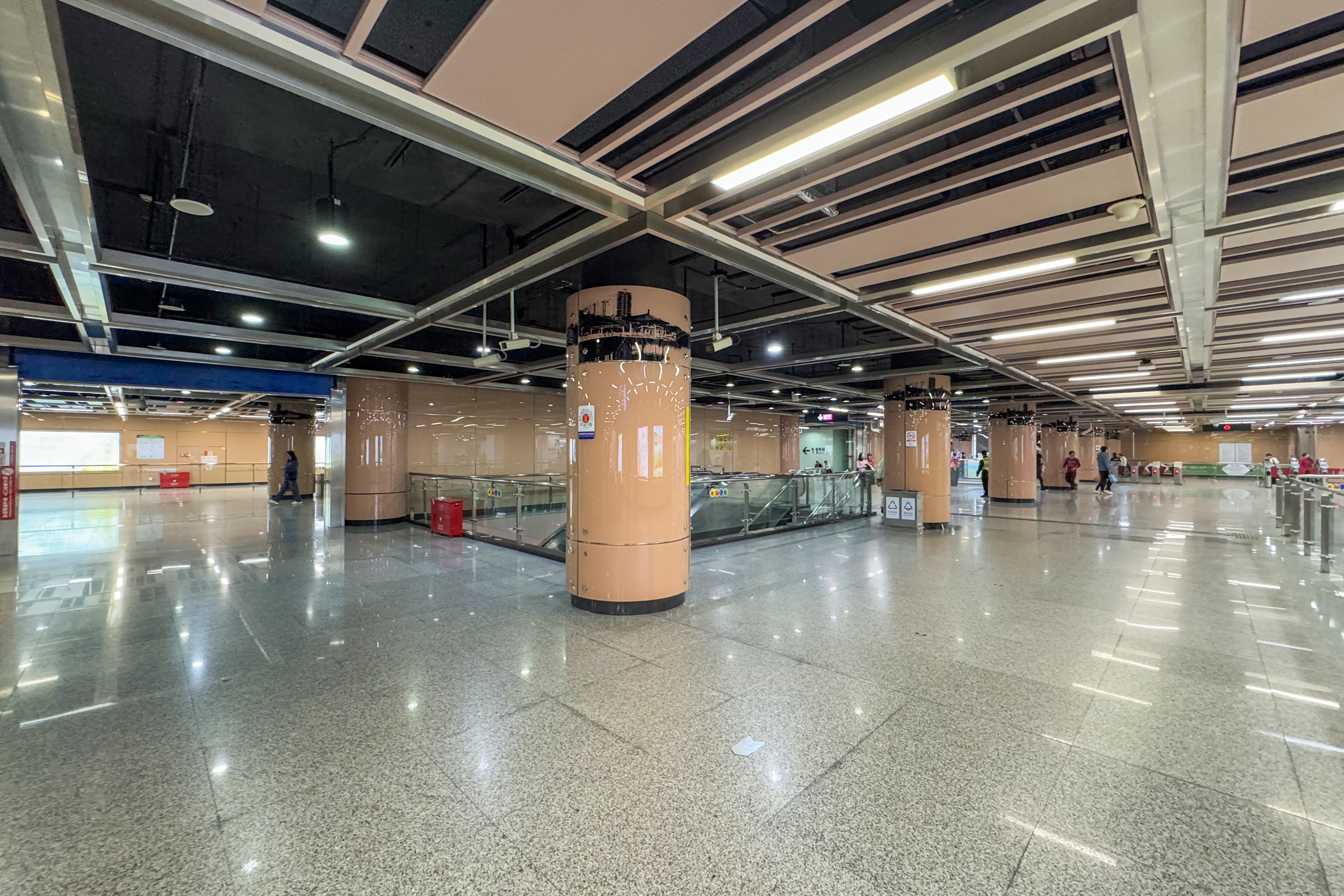
Line 6 concourse (after Line 11 opening)

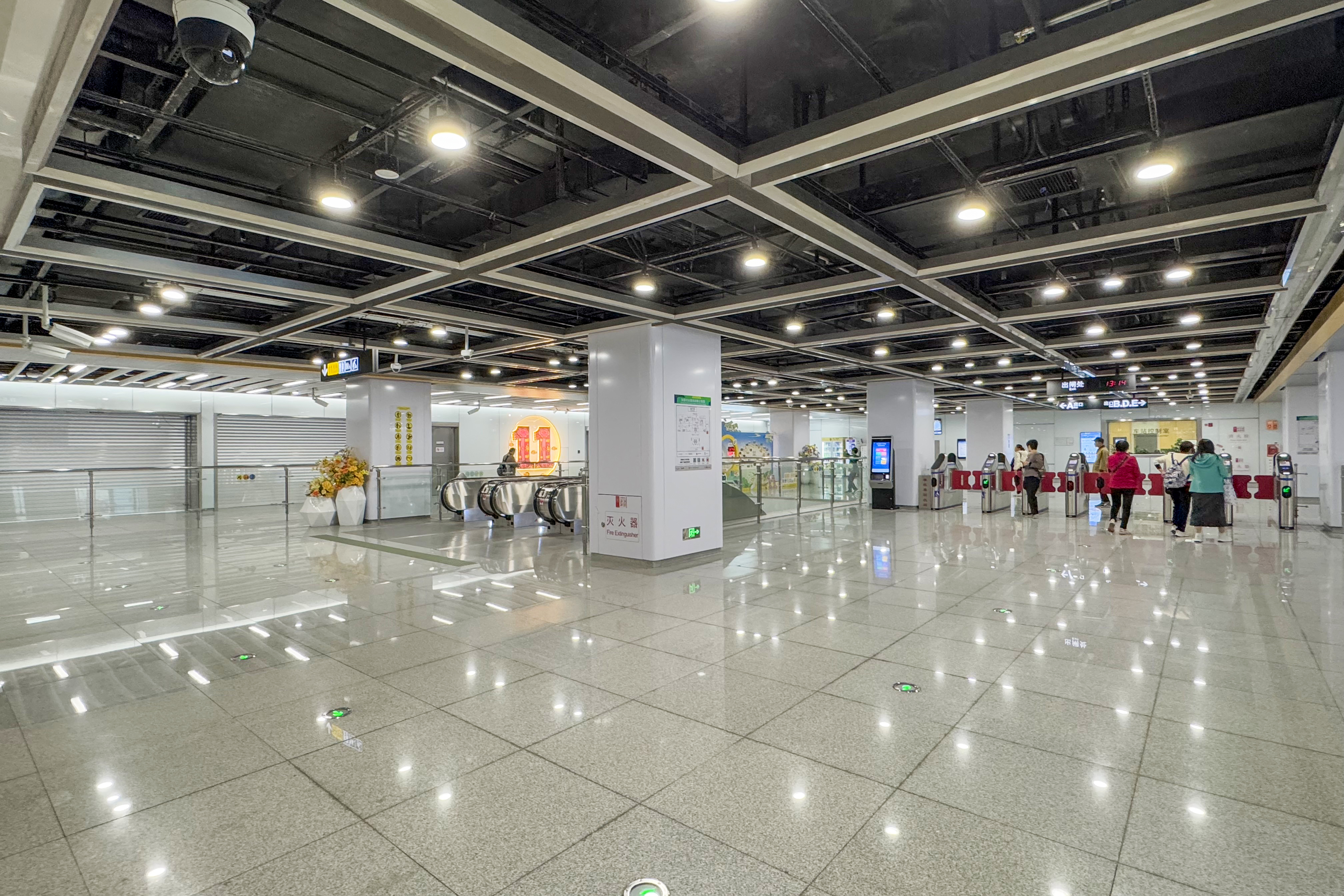
Line 11 concourse east side

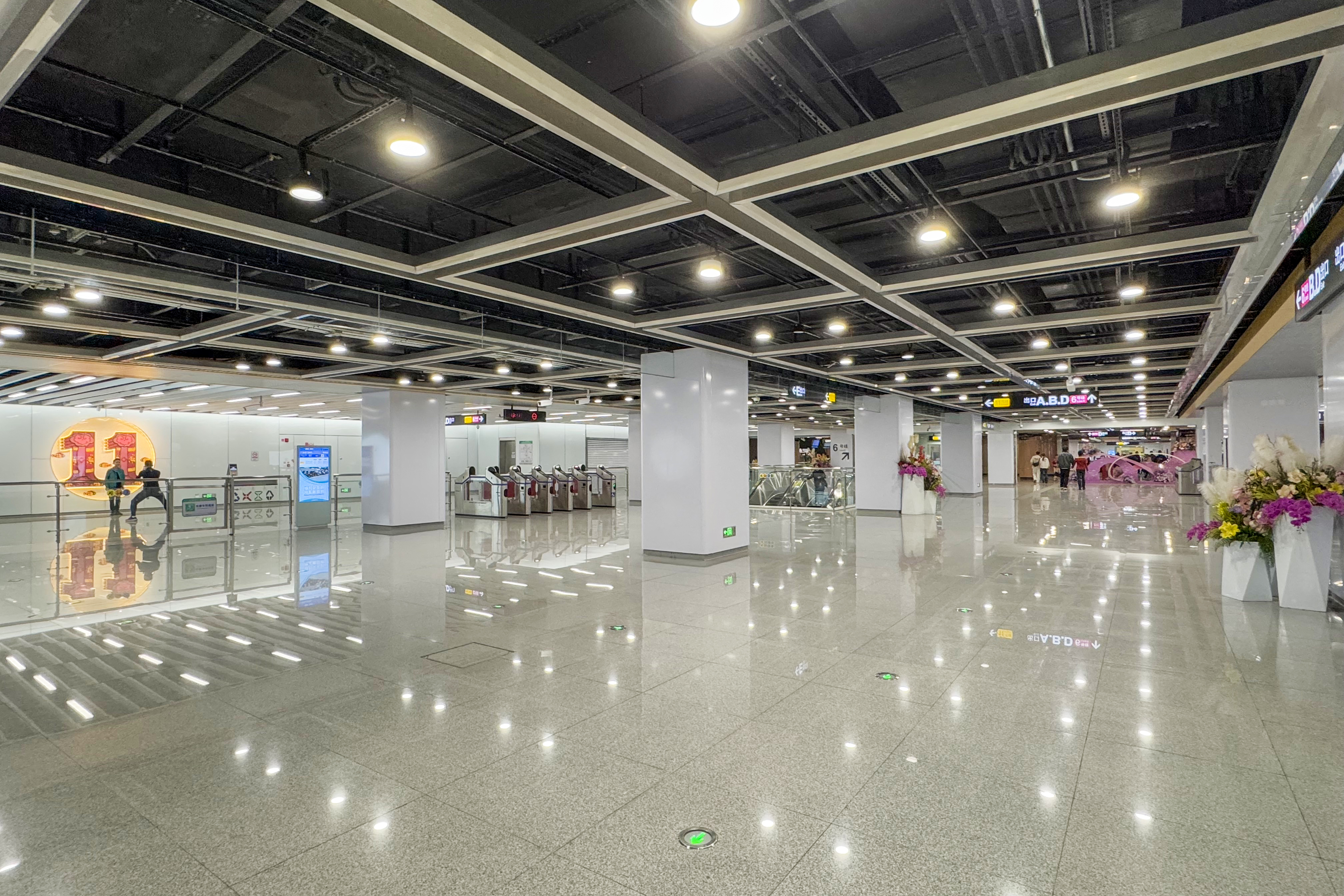
Line 11 concourse west side

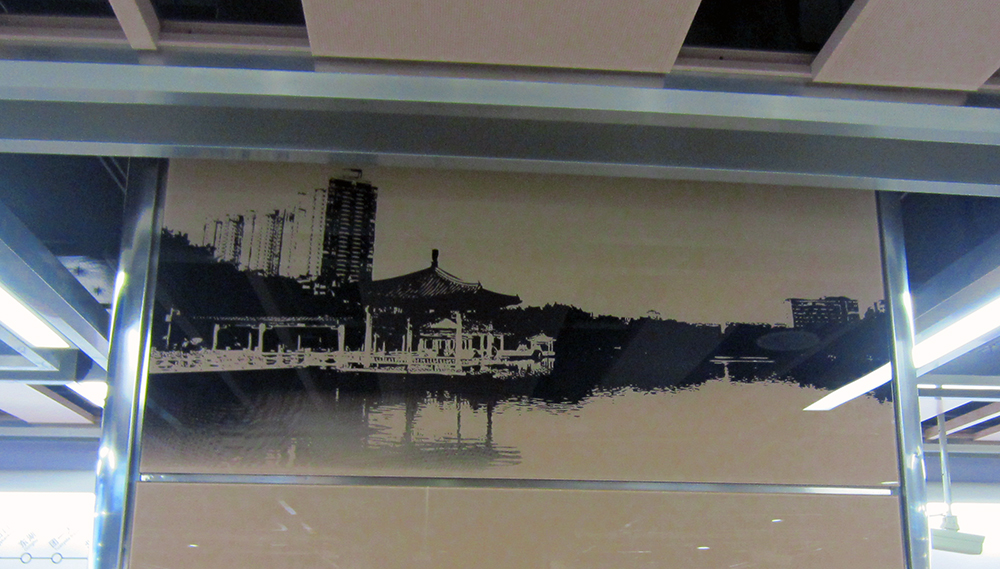
Column decoration

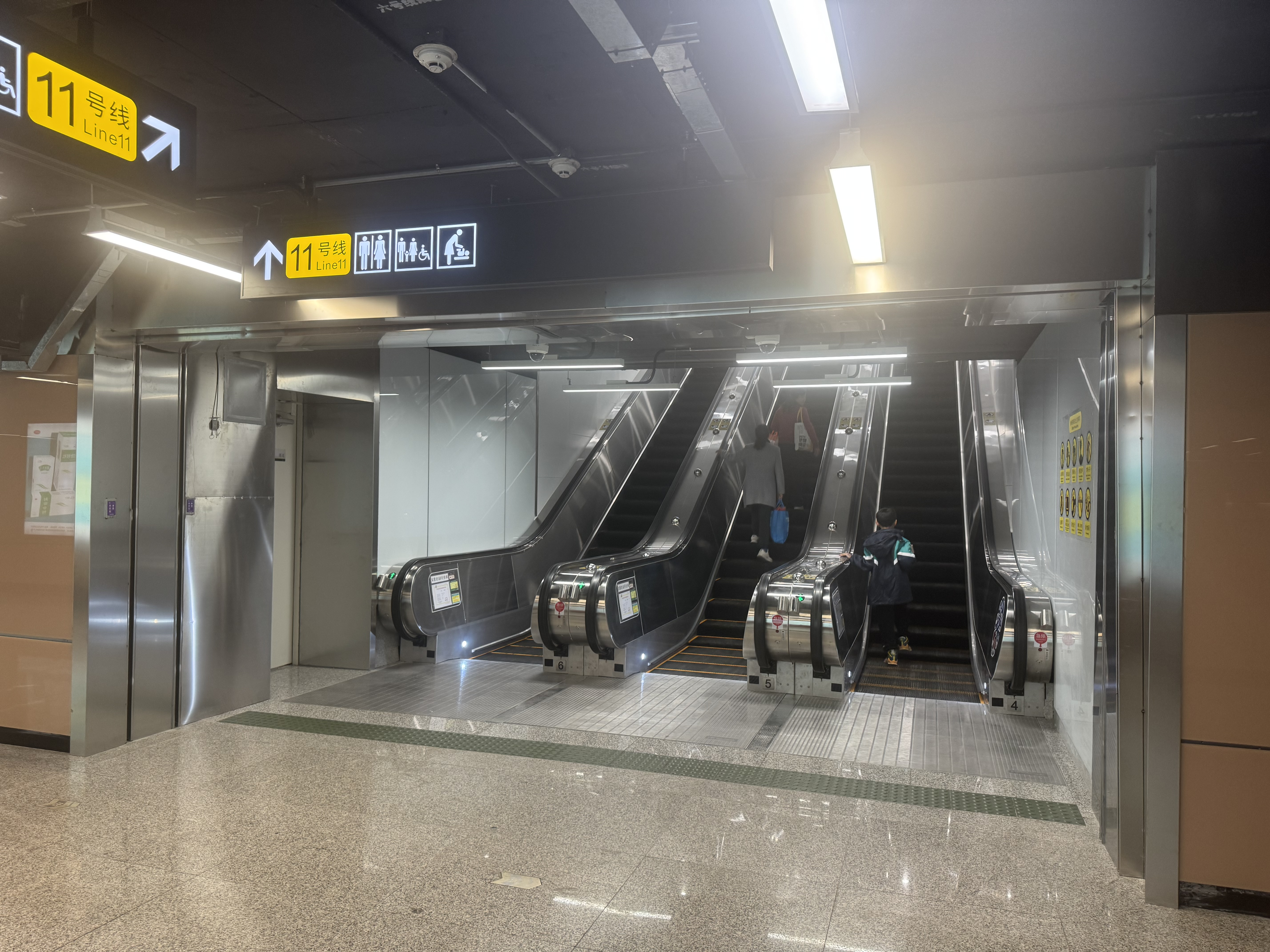
One-way transfer node from Line 6 to Line 11 platforms

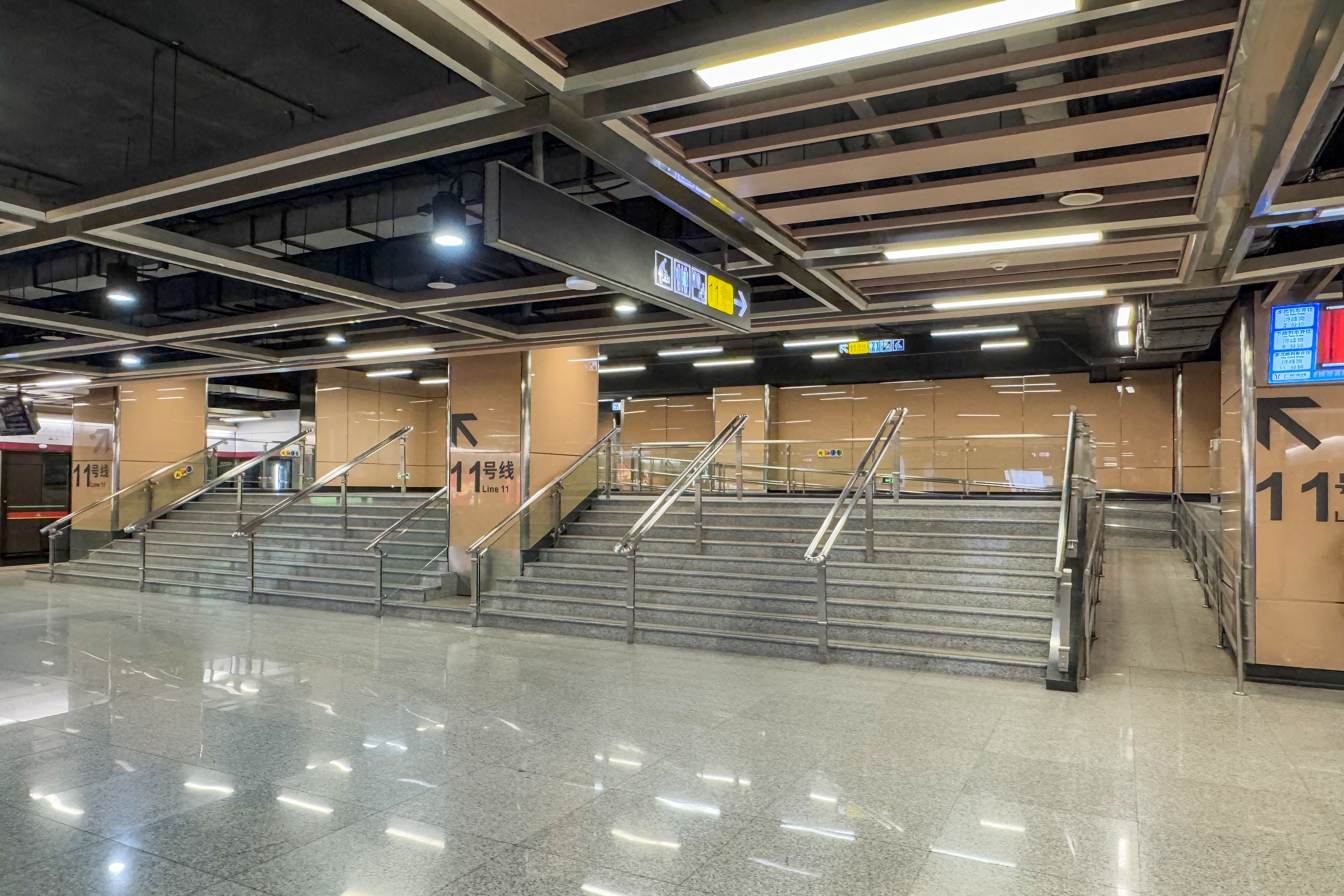
Line 6 platform transfer stairway to Line 11

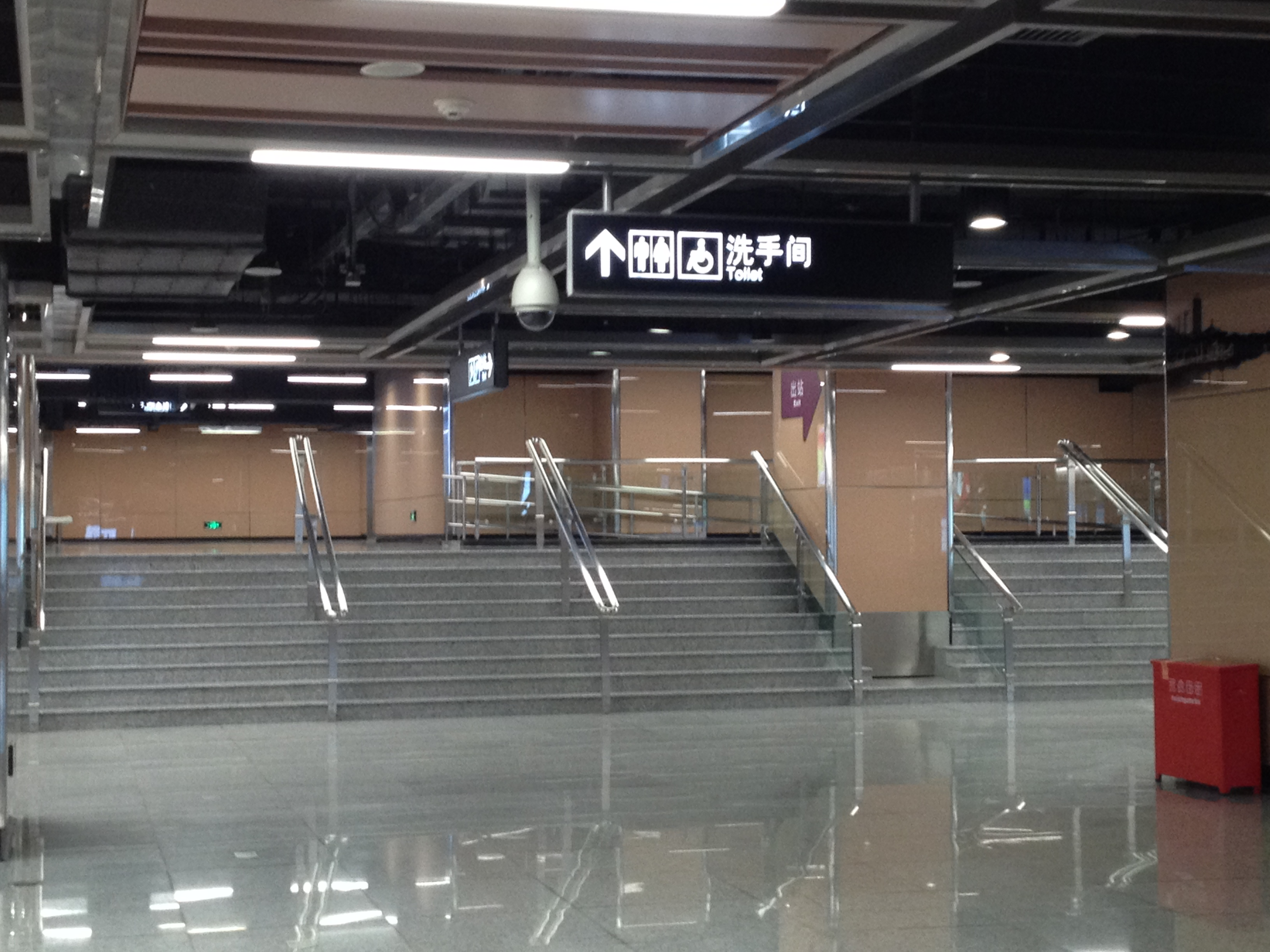
Restroom at north end of Line 6 concourse, with the reserved transfer node for Line 11 visible (2014)

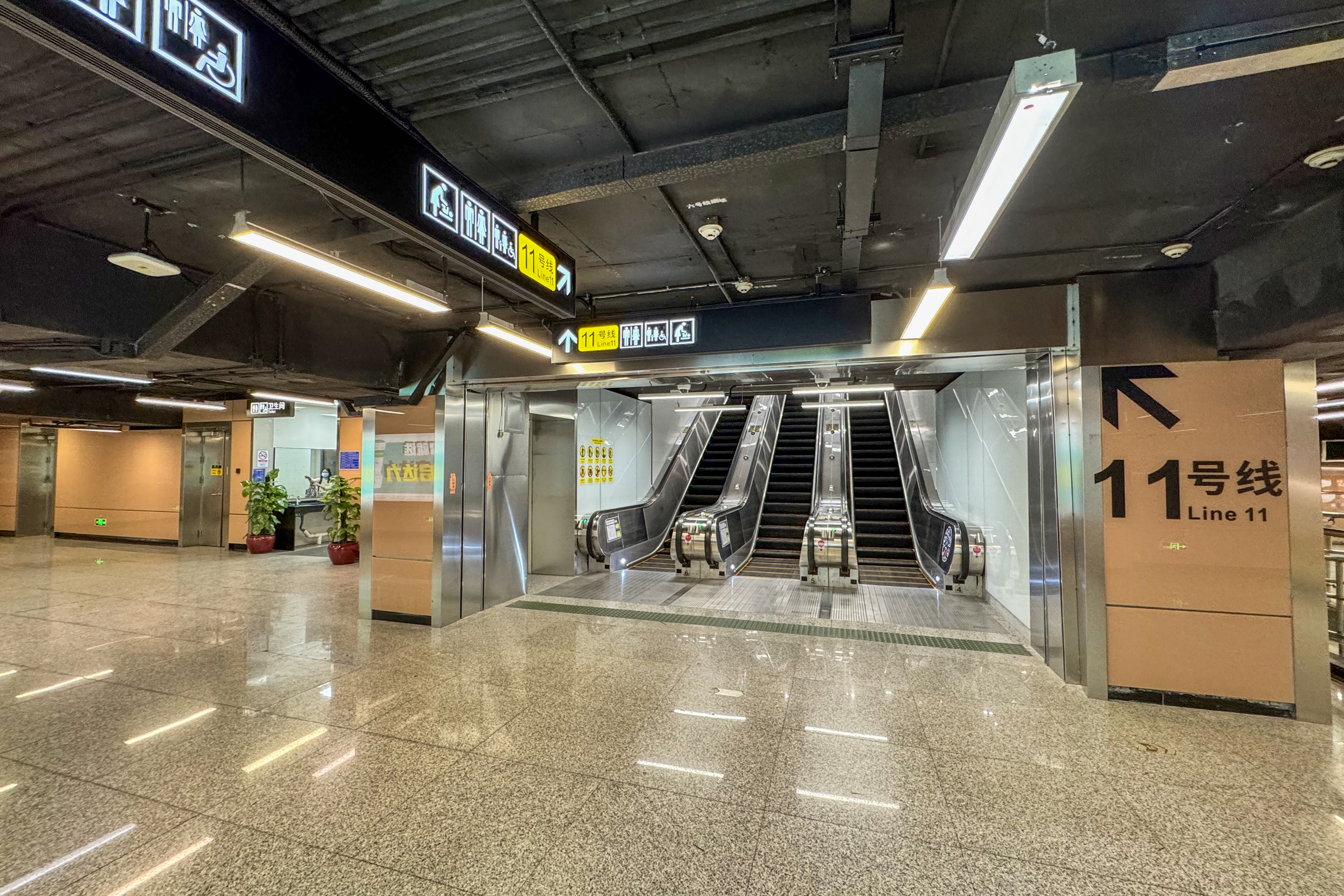
Line 6 platform interlayer transfer escalators to Line 11 and toilets

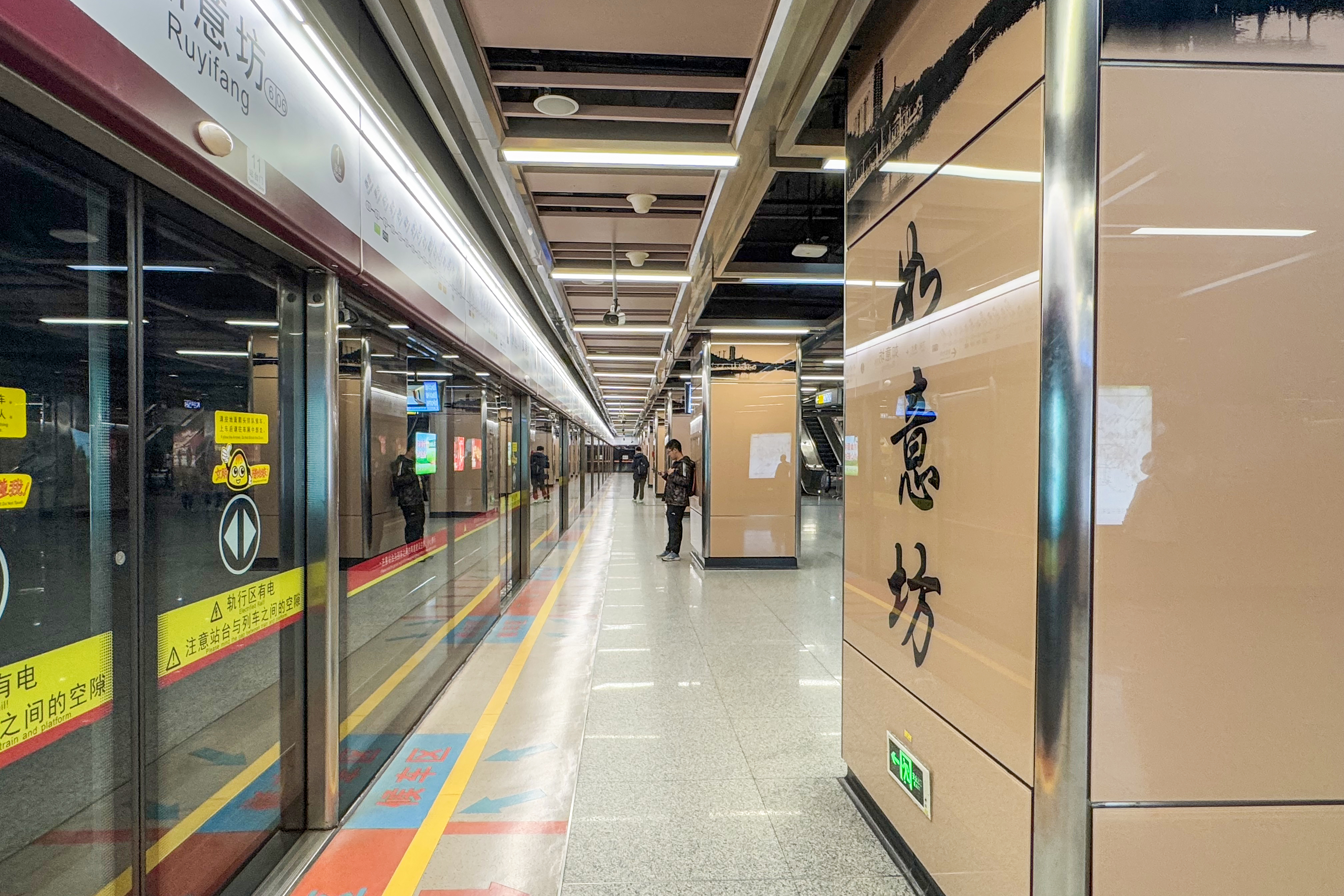
Line 6 platform 1 (towards Xunfenggang)

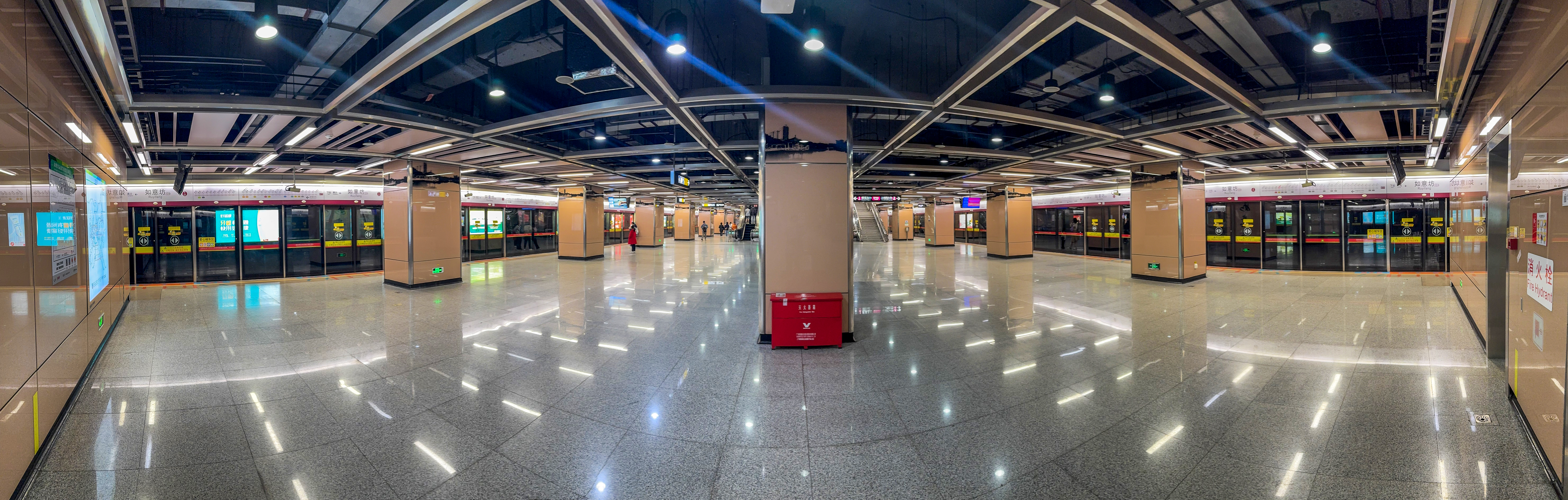
Line 6 full platform panorama

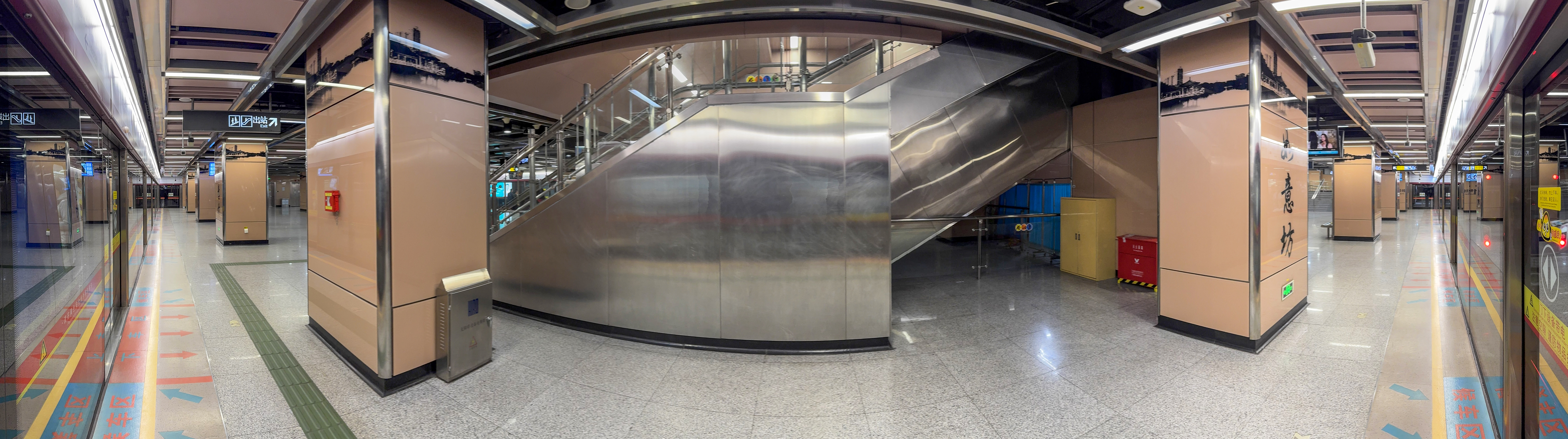
Line 6 platform 2 panorama

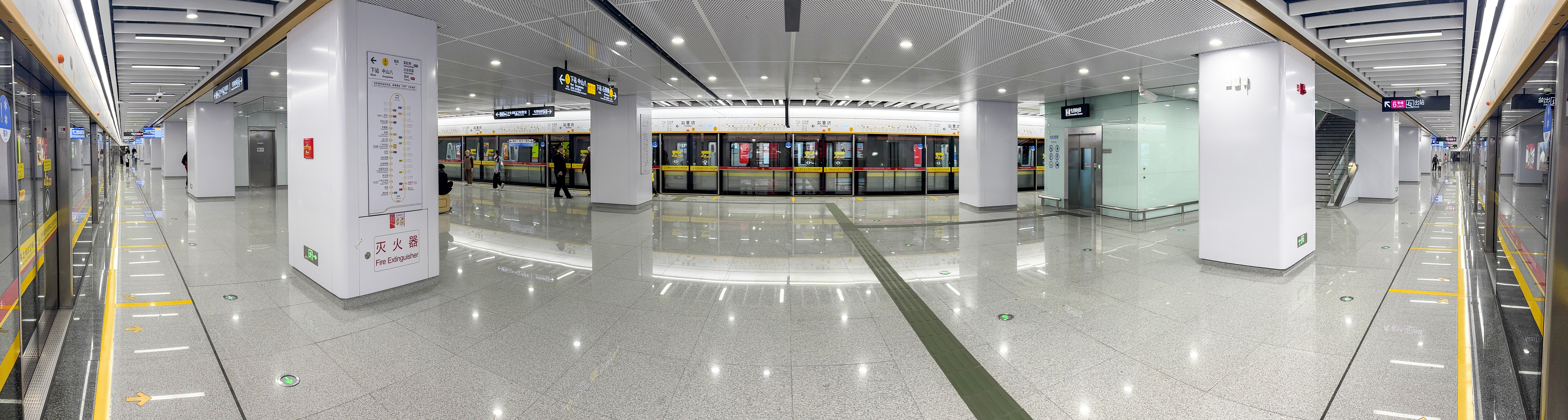
Line 11 platform 4 panorama

== History ==
This station first appeared in 1997 in the "Guangzhou City Rapid Rail Traffic Line Planning Research (Final Report)", and was a station on Line 5 (Ring Line) in Plan B at that time, located near the original Guangzhou South Railway Station. Later, in the 2003 plan, this station was confirmed to be one of the stops on the current Line 6. In the 2008 proposal, the new Great Ring Line also passed through the station and intersected with Line 6. In the end, the ring line became the current line 11 (Large Ring) in the 2010 plan, and it can still interchange with Line 6 here. In 2006, the construction of the Line 6 station started. The original construction plan of the station was the design of the open-cut station hall and the concealed excavation of the island platform, which was later modified to the design of the island platform station with full cut-and-cover after the subsidence incident. At the same time, due to the planned circular line passing through this station, some platforms and interchange points of the ring line have been added to the station design. On 15 October 2011, the station was topped out. On 28 December 2013, the station was put into use with the opening of Line 6.

The Line 11 station started the main structure construction in July 2018, topped out in December 2021, and in April 2024 completed the construction work connecting the station to Line 6, before completing the "three rights" transfer on 30 July of the same year.
