= Zhongshanba station =

Guangzhou Metro Line 5 and Line 11 station

Zhongshanba 中山八
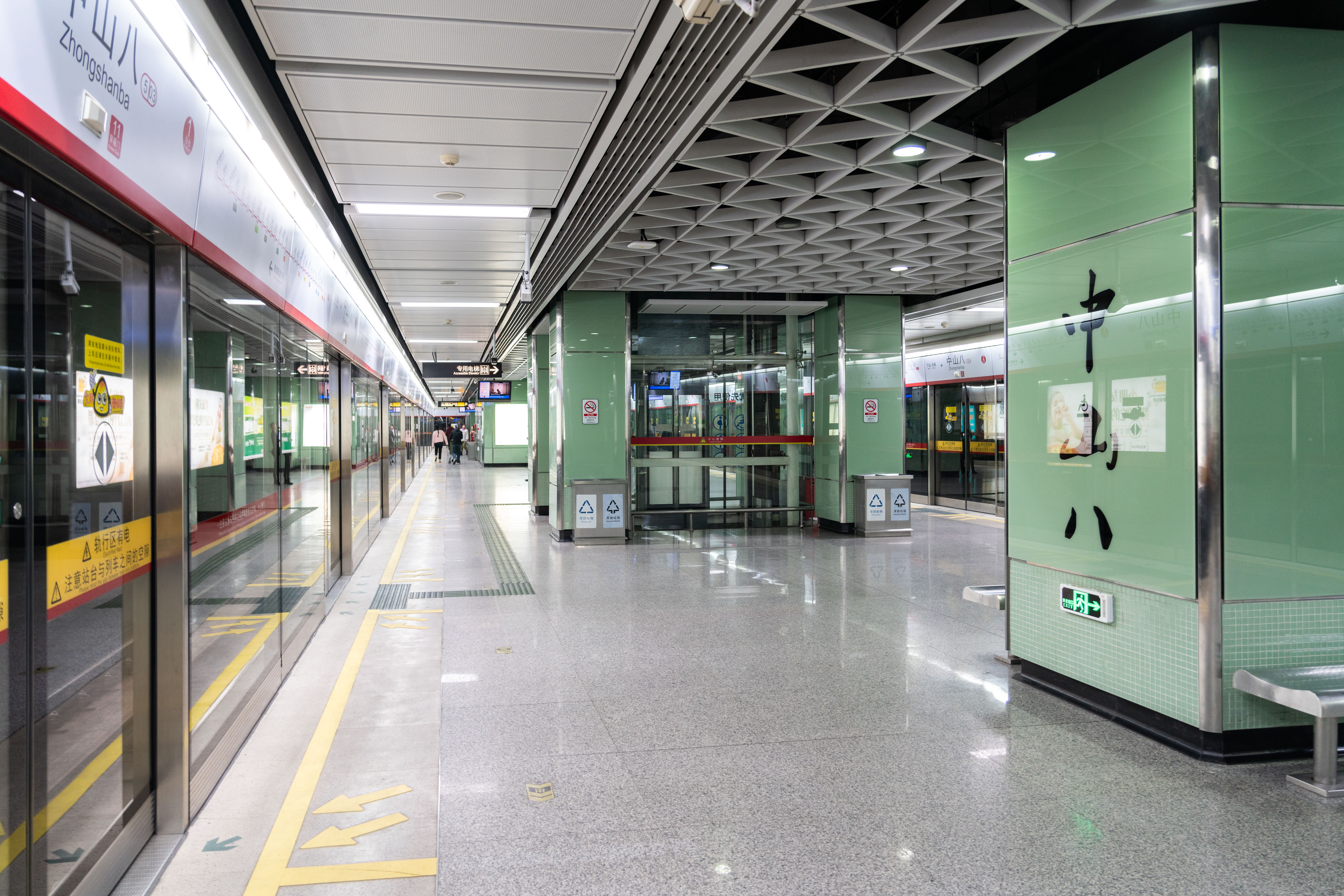
- Line 5 platform

Chinese name
- Chinese: 中山八站
Transcriptions
Standard Mandarin
- Hanyu Pinyin: Zhōngshānbā Zhàn
Yue: Cantonese
- Yale Romanization: Jūngsāanbaat Jaahm
- Jyutping: Zung^{1}saan^{1}baat^{3} Zaam^{6}

General information
- Location: Northeast side of intersection of Zhongshan 8th Road (中山八路) and Huangsha Avenue (黄沙大道), Caihong Subdistrict; Liwan District, Guangzhou, Guangdong; China
- Coordinates: 23°7′43.88″N 113°13′38.92″E
- Operator: Guangzhou Metro Co. Ltd.
- Lines: Line 5; Line 11
- Platforms: 4 (2 island platforms)
- Tracks: 4

Construction
- Structure type: Underground
- Accessible: Yes

Other information
- Station code: 503 1117

History
- Opened: Line 5: 28 December 2009 (16 years ago); Line 11: 28 December 2024 (19 months ago)

Services
Preceding station	Guangzhou Metro	Following station
Tanwei towards Jiaokou	Line 5	Xichang towards Huangpu New Port
Ruyifang Outer Circle	Line 11	Caihong Bridge Inner Circle
Location

Zhongshanba Station (Chinese: 中山八站; pinyin: Zhōngshānbā Zhàn; Cantonese Yale: Jūngsāanbaat Jaahm), formerly Zhongshan Balu Station (中山八路站; Jūngsāan Baat Louh Jaahm; 'Sun Yat-sen 8th Road Station') during planning, is an interchange station between Line 5 and Line 11 of the Guangzhou Metro. It is located under the junction of Zhongshan 8th Road (中山八路) and Huangsha Avenue (黄沙大道) in the commercial area of the Liwan District, near Liwan Lake (荔湾湖) and Guangzhou-Foshan Coach Terminal (广佛客运站). Line 5 started operations on 28 December 2009. Line 11 started operations on 28 December 2024.

The station body of Line 11 and the Zhongshan 8th Road Transportation Hub project above it were constructed simultaneously.

== Usage ==
Above this station is the Zhongshan 8th Road Bus Terminus, which is also close to the Guangzhou-Foshan Coach Terminal, so many passengers take the highway bus to this station to take the metro to various districts in Guangzhou. At the same time, this station is close to the clothing wholesale market, and is also close to the north gate of Liwan Lake Park, Pantang and nearby residences, so the station has a good flow of passengers throughout the day, but there are little to no crowding issues.

== Station layout ==
=== Line 5 ===
G	-	Exits A, D, E, F
L1; Concourse	Lobby	TIcket Machines, Customer Service, Shops, Police Station, Security Facilities, Transfer to Line 11
L2; Equipment Area	-	Station Equipment
L3; Platforms	Platform 2	5 towards Jiaokou (Tanwei)
L3; Platforms	Island platform, doors will open on the left
L3; Platforms	Platform 1	5 towards Huangpu New Port (Xichang)

=== Line 11 ===
G	-	Exits A, D, E, F
L1; Concourse	Lobby	Ticket Machines, Customer Service, Shops, Police Station, Baby Change, Security Facilities, Transfer to Line 5
L2	Transfer level	Towards concourse and platforms, Station Equipment
L3	Transfer level	Towards concourse and platforms, Toilets, Nursery, Station Equipment
L4	Transfer level	Towards concourse and platforms, Station Equipment
L5; Platforms	Platform 3	11 Outer Circle (Ruyifang)
L5; Platforms	Island platform, doors will open on the left
L5; Platforms	Platform 4	11 Inner Circle (Caihong Bridge)

=== Entrances/exits ===
The station originally had Exit B at the beginning of its opening, but it was closed and dismantled due to the construction of Line 11 in the later stage. After the opening of the Line 11 station, a new Exit E was added. Exit E is equipped with an elevator. Exits D, E and F provide access to the Zhongshan 8th Road Transportation Hub.

- A: Zhongshan 8th Road, Huangsha Avenue, Pun Tong, Liwan Lake Park, Renwei Temple
- D: Zhongshan 8th Road, Zhongshan 8th Road Transportation Hub
- E: Xinhong Street, Zhongshan 8th Road Transportation Hub
- F: Zhongshan 8th Road, Zhongshan 8th Road Transportation Hub
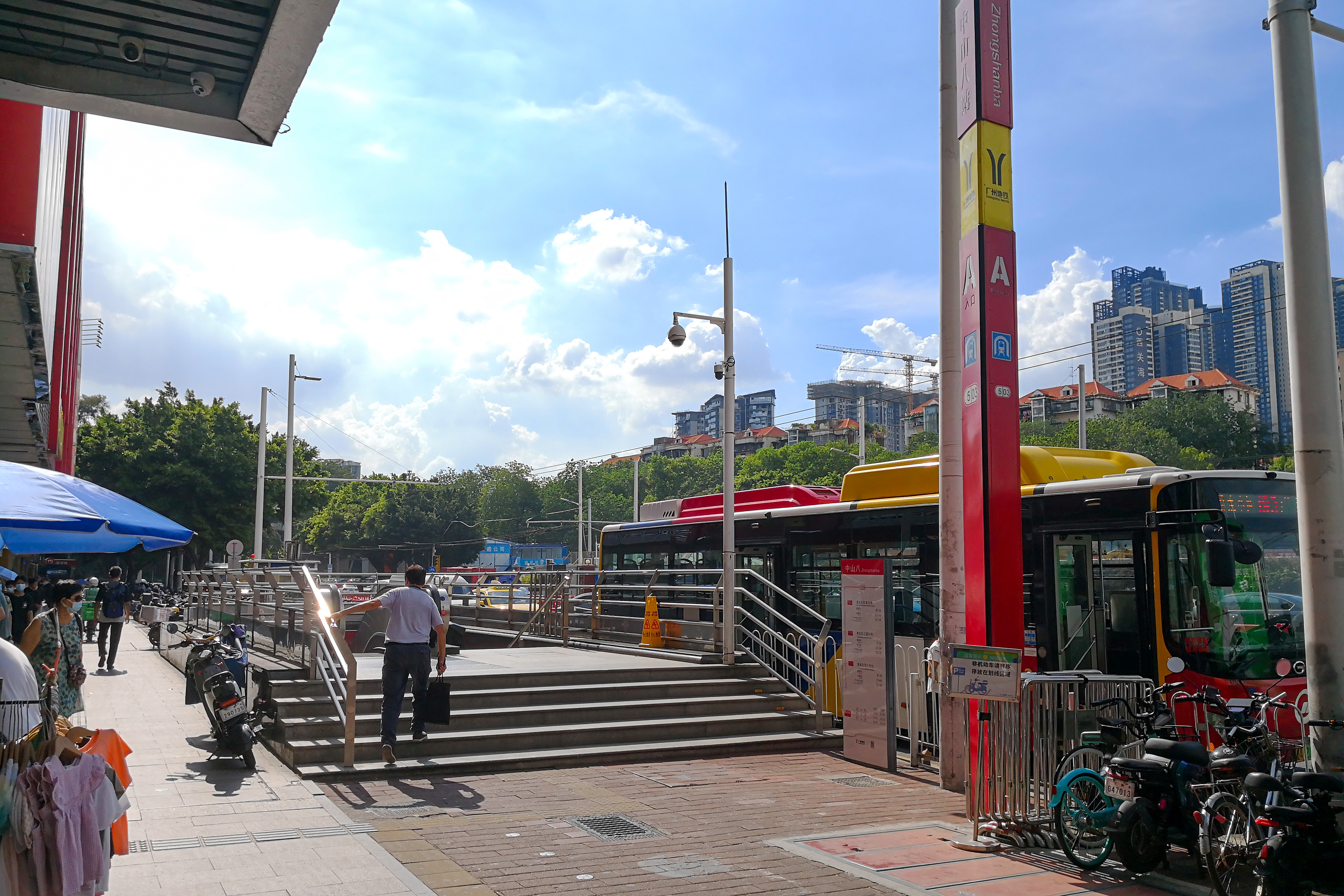
Entrance A

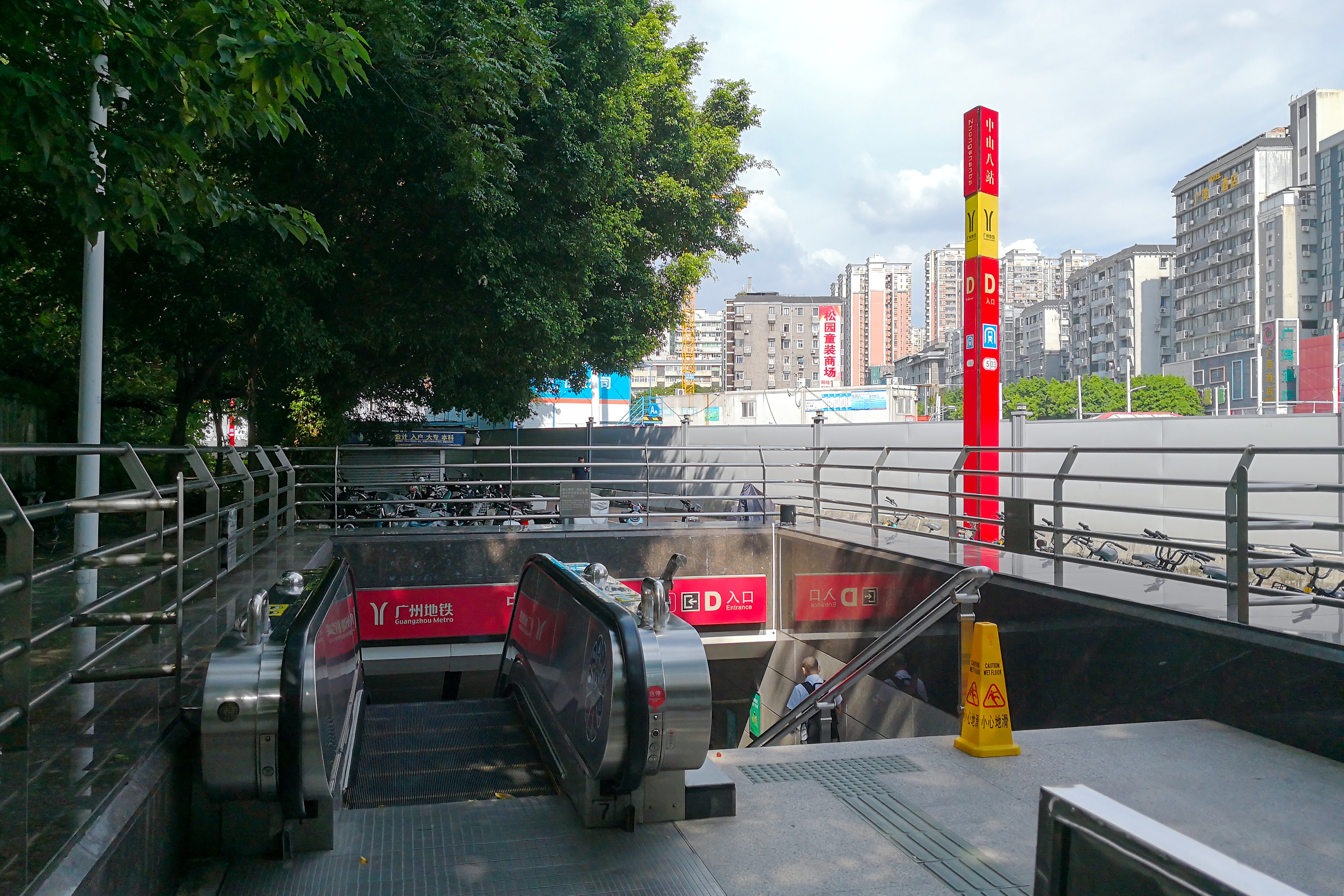
Entrance D

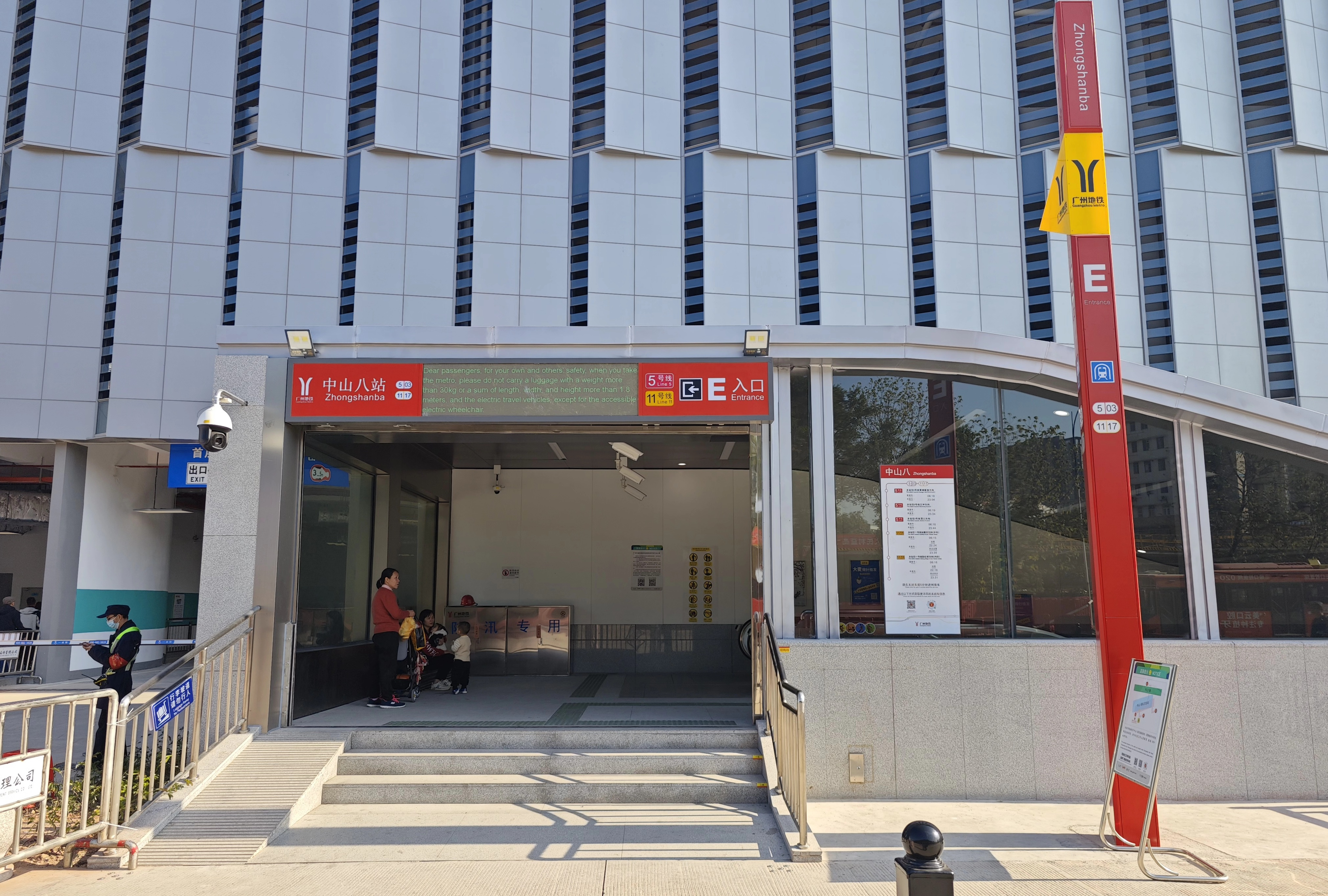
Entrance E

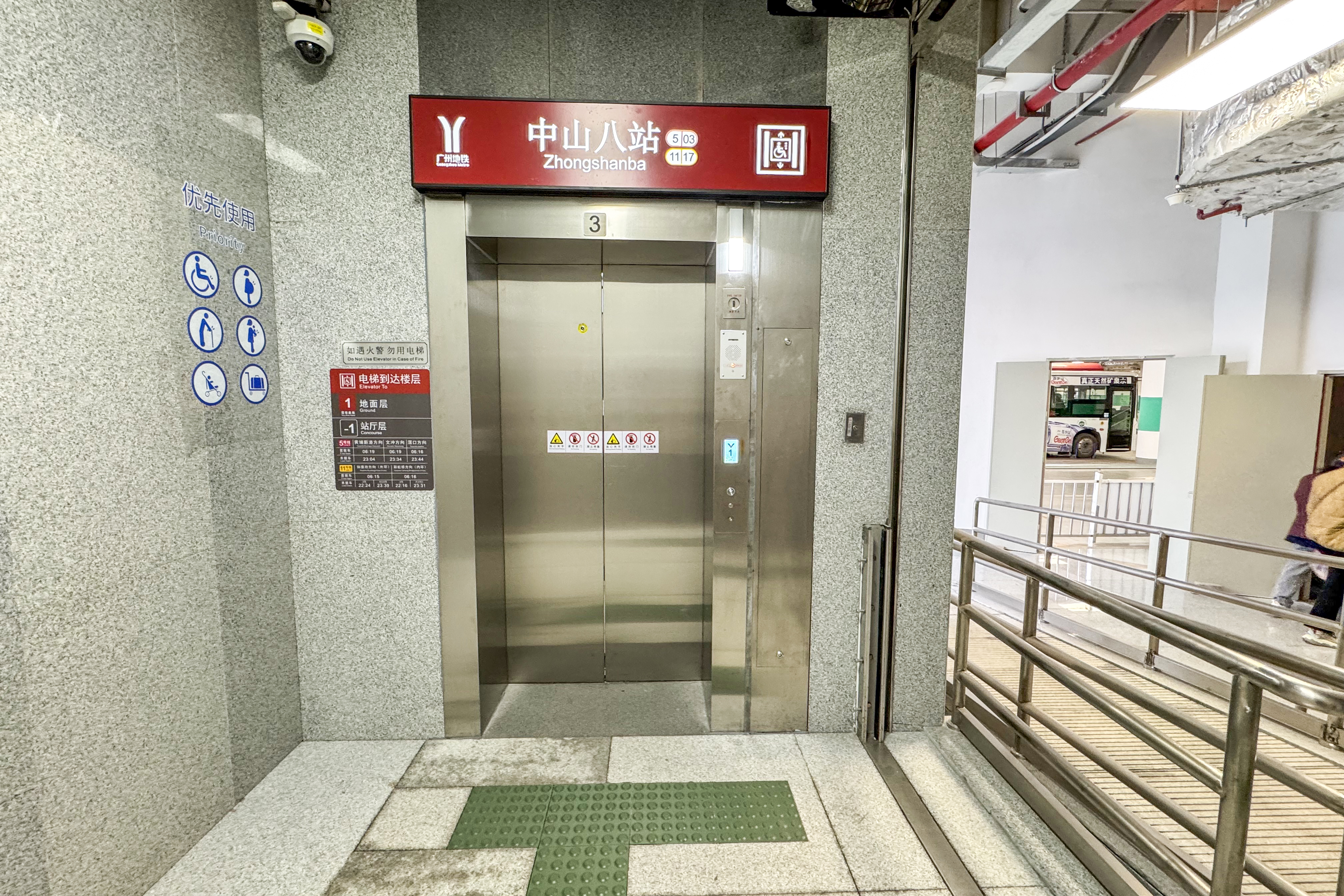
Elevator of Entrance E toward transportation hub

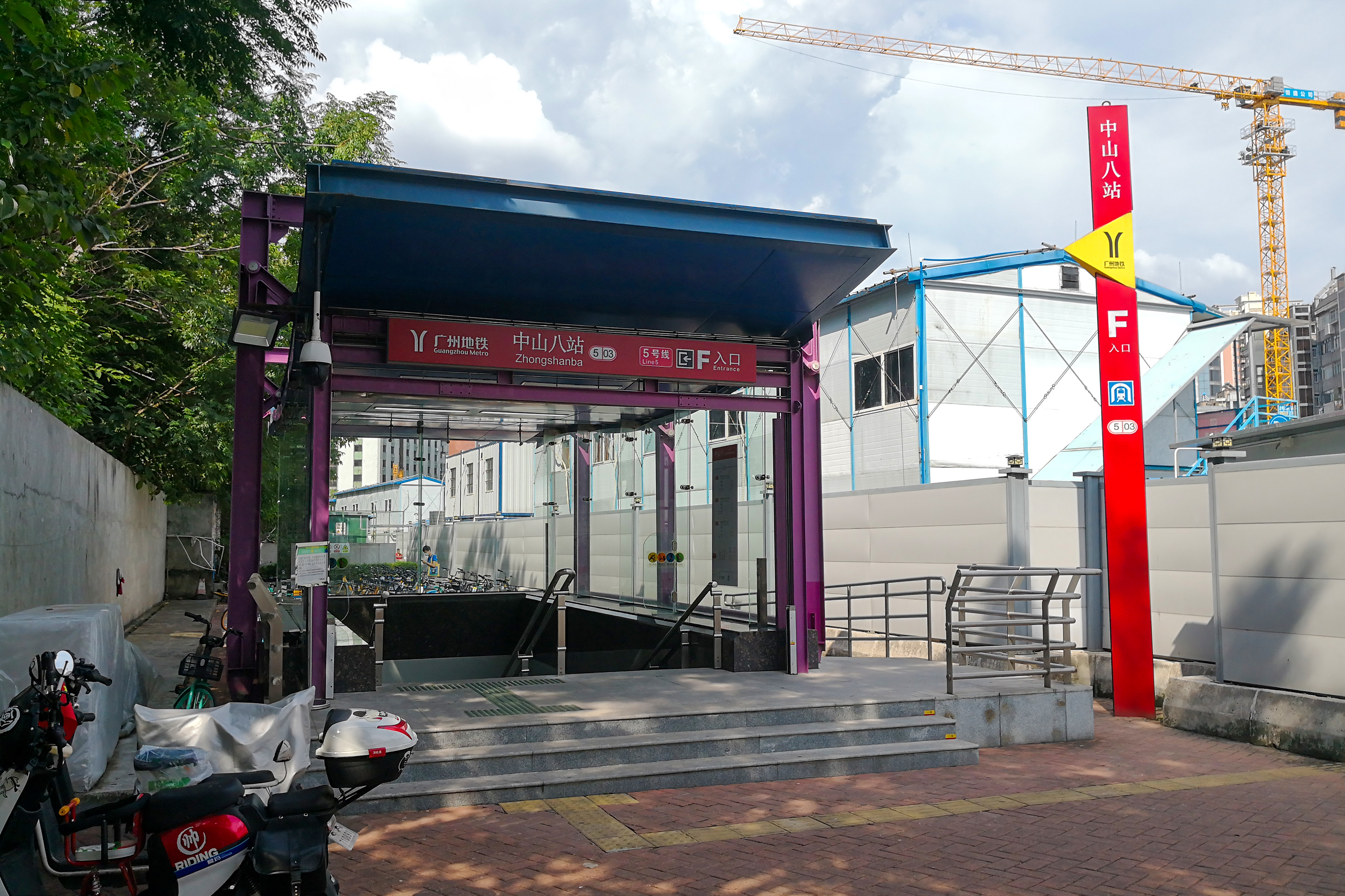
Entrance F

== Gallery ==
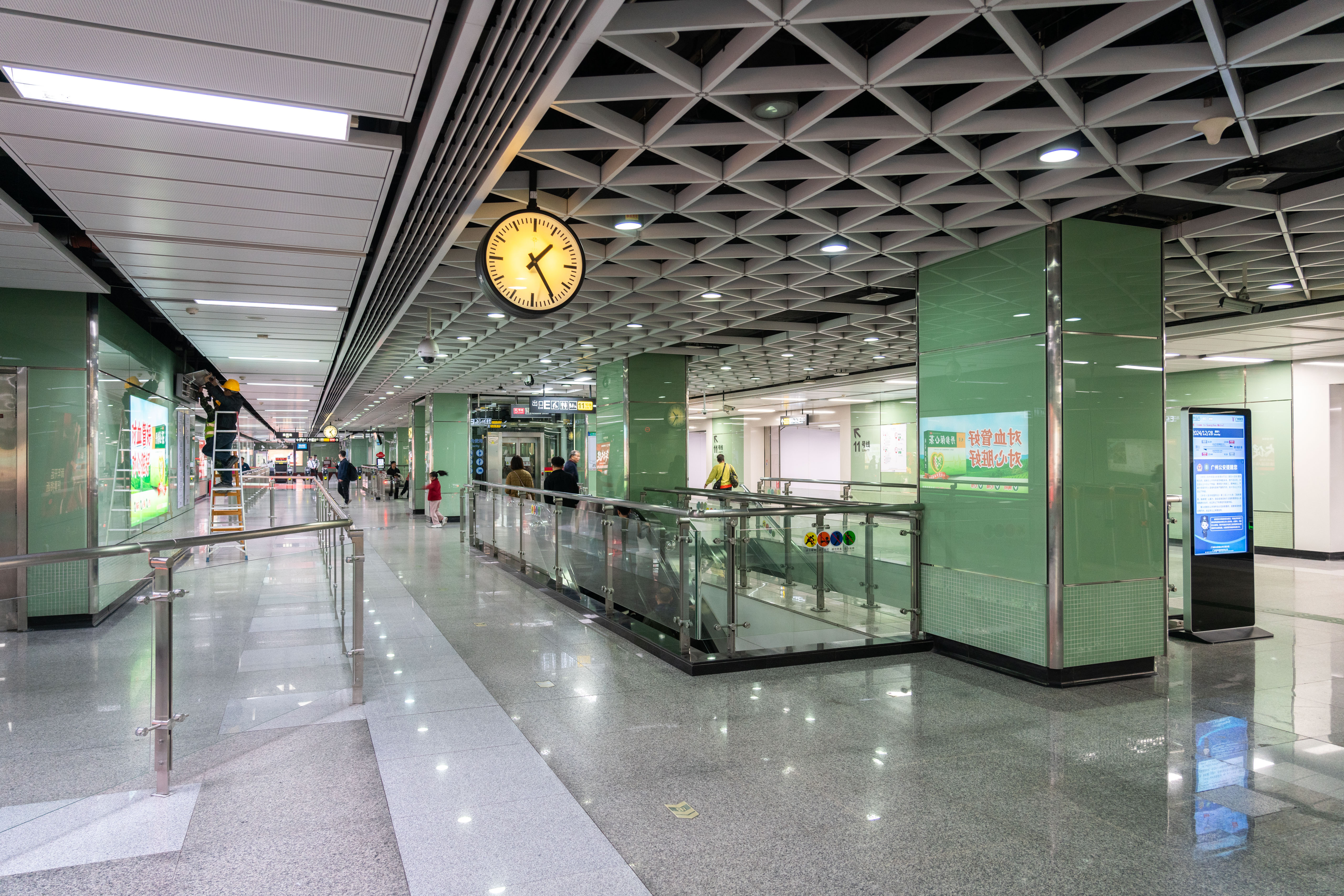
Line 5 concourse

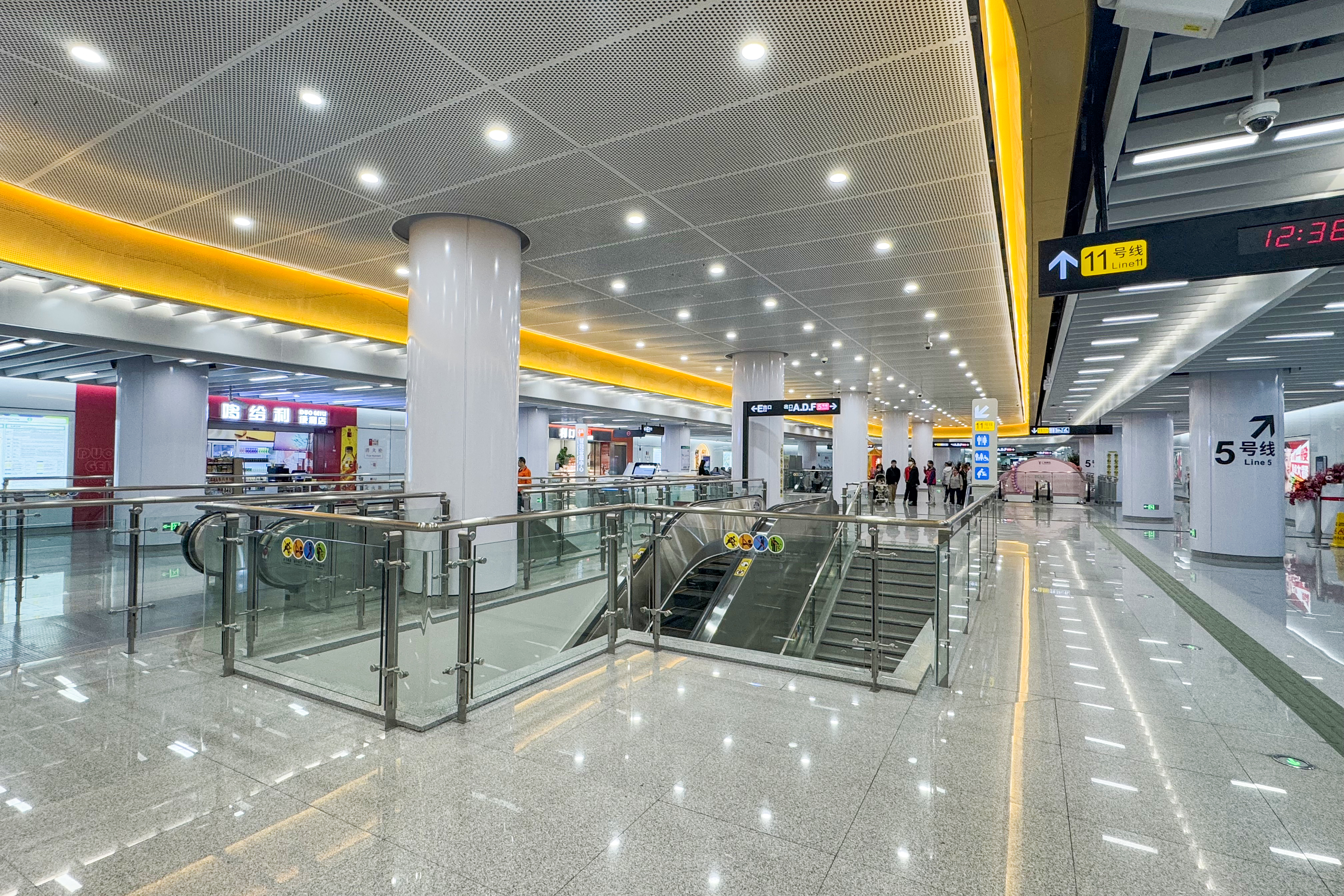
Line 11 concourse

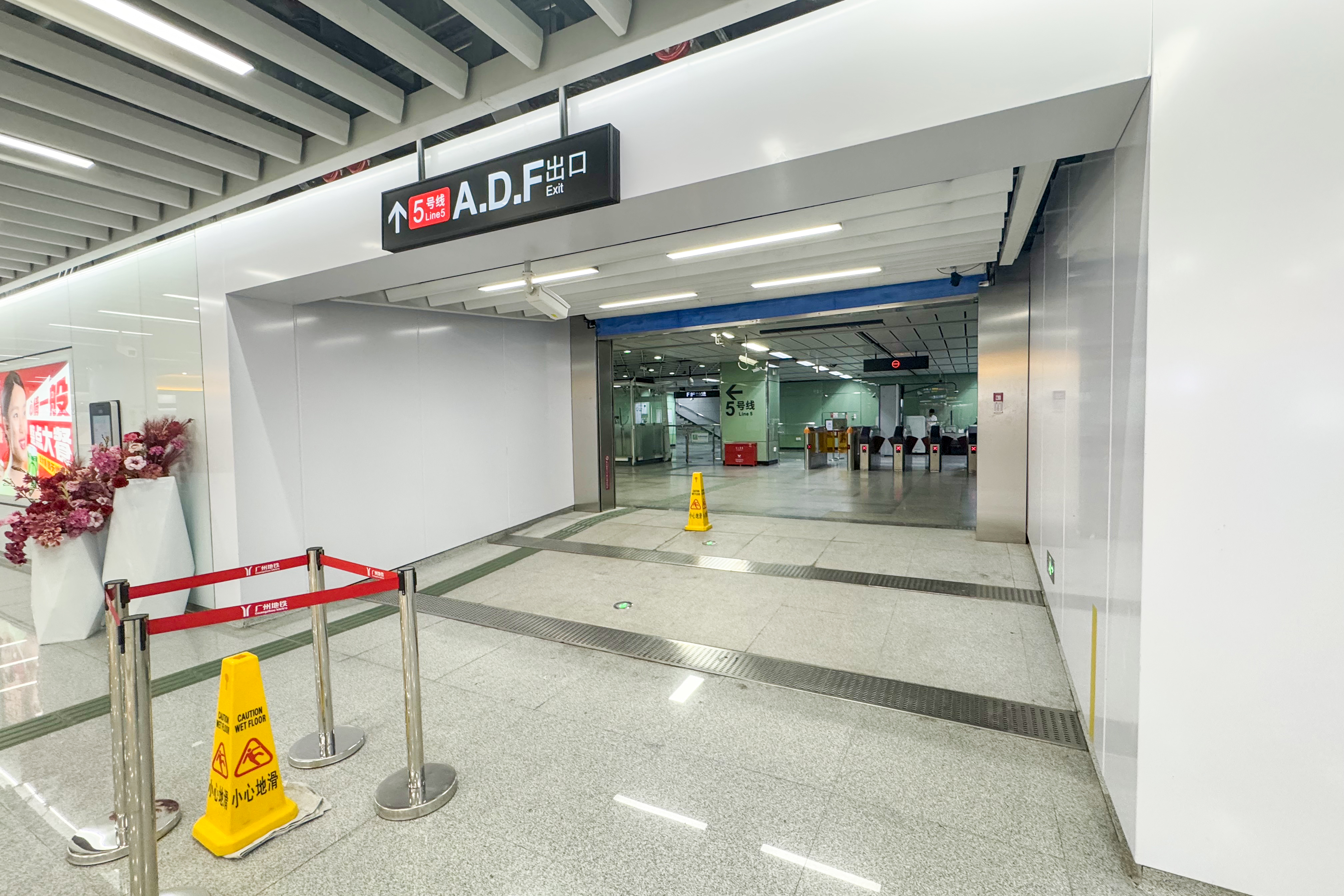
Line 11 concourse transfer node towards Line 5 concourse

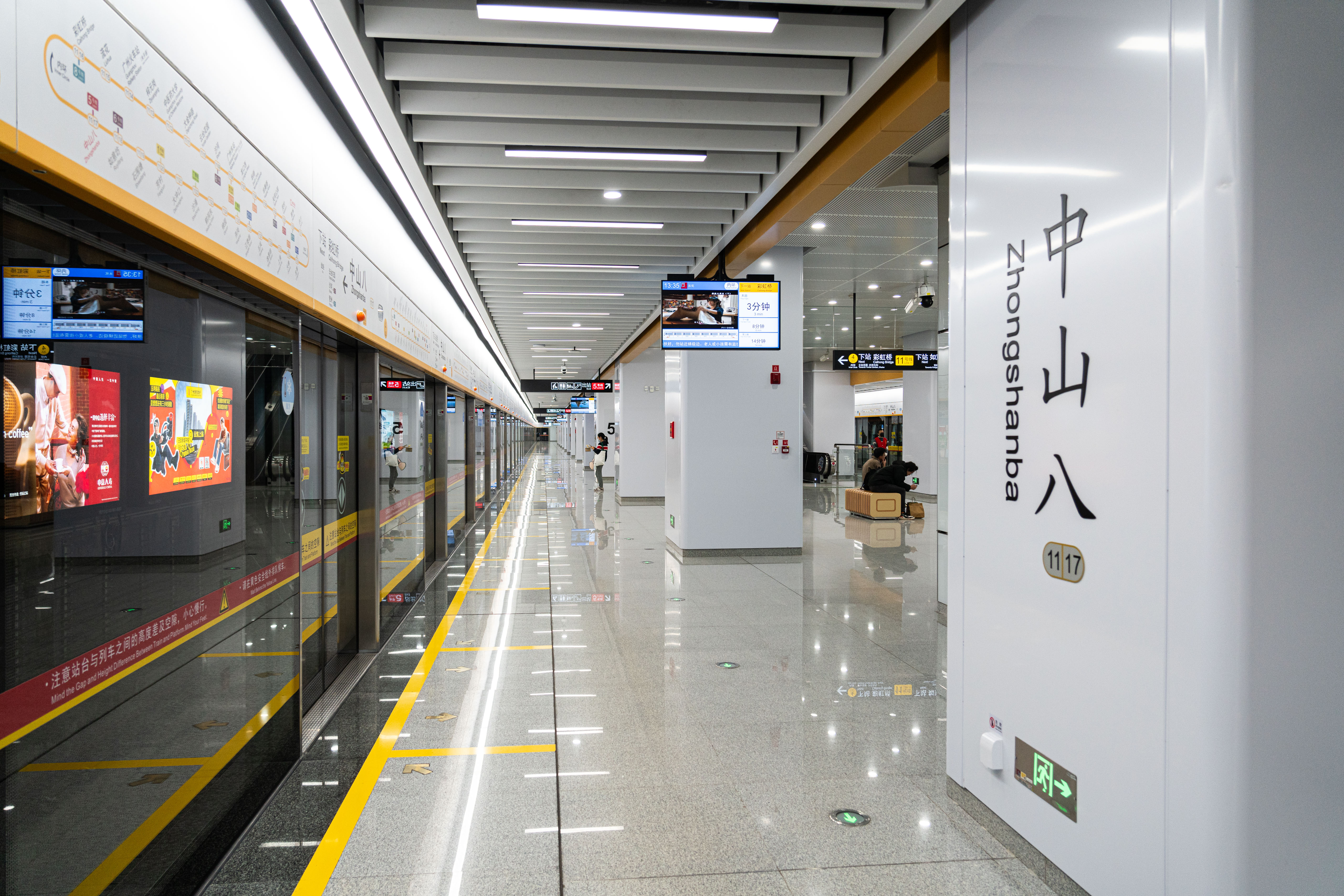
Line 11 platform 4 (Inner Circle platform)

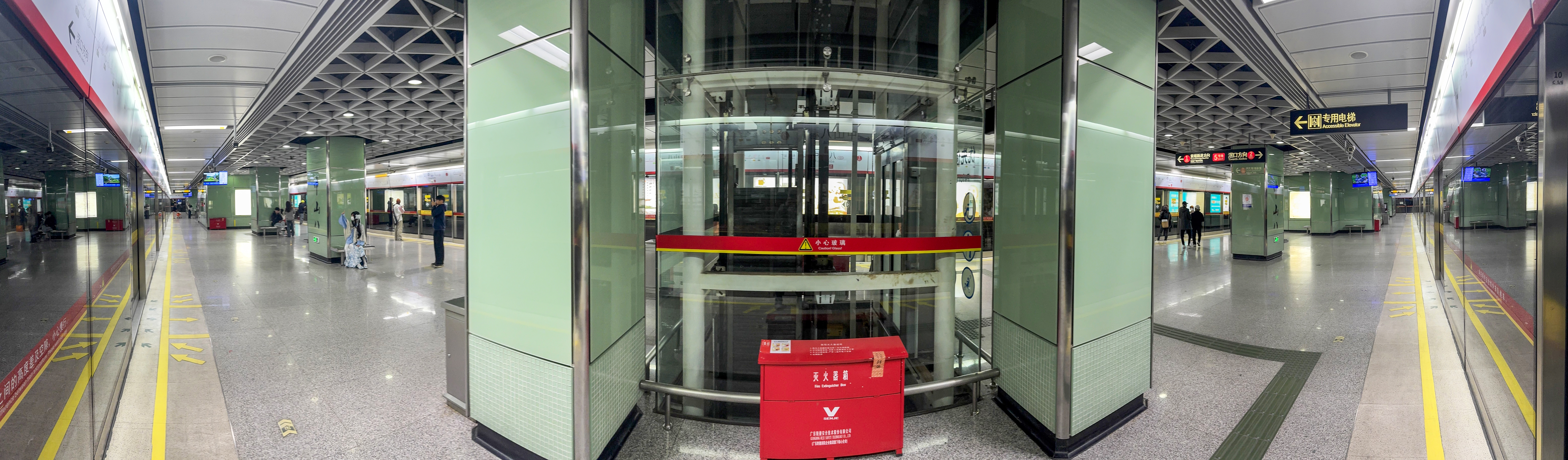
Line 5 platform panorama

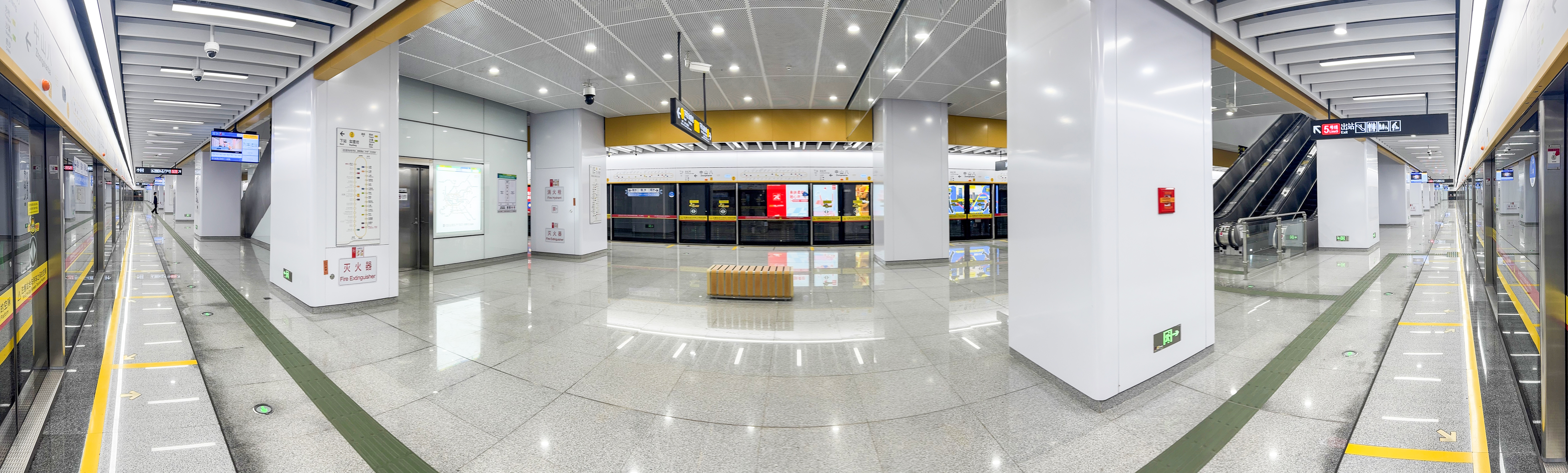
Line 11 platform panorama

== History ==
=== Plan ===
The station first appeared in 1997 in the "Guangzhou City Urban Expressway Traffic Line Network Planning Study (Final Report)", which was a station of Line 5 (Ring Line) in Plan B at that time, located on Zhongshan 8th Road near Liwan Lake Park, called Zhongshan Balu station. Later, in the 2003 plan, the station was identified as one of the stations of the current Line 5, and was subsequently renamed Zhongshanba Station. In the 2008 proposal, the new Great Ring Line also passed through this station and intersected with Line 5. In the 2010 plan, the ring line became the current Line 11 (Great Ring Line), which can still interchange with Line 5.

=== Construction ===
==== Line 5 ====
In 2006, Line 5 began construction. In December 2007, the station site was enclosed. On 28 December 2009, the station was put into use with the opening of Line 5. At the beginning of the station's opening, there was only one exit (Exit D), and Exit B was opened soon after. Exit A, located on the south side of Zhongshan 8th Road, had its construction postponed to September 2013 due to land acquisition issues and opened in early 2016. In 2019, the station opened Exit F. Exit B was closed on 8 August 2019 to facilitate the construction of Line 11.

==== Line 11 ====
In 2014, Line 11 carried out pre-construction survey and drilling, and at about 09:53 on August 28 of the same year, a train in the direction of Wenchong on Line 5 drove out of the station, and a foreign object suddenly hit the front of the train above the tunnel, but no casualties were caused. Guangzhou Metro adjusted the operation plan of Line 5 and organized a bus connection, before resuming normal service at 12:08 noon on the same day. The metro company later confirmed that the construction unit of Line 11 had changed the location of the drill hole without permission, resulting in the tunnel being drilled through the section.

In late April 2017, the construction of the Line 11 station officially began. In order to cooperate with the construction of the station, the concourse floor of Line 5 was temporarily renovated from June 10 to August 10. Subsequently, on August 8 of the following year, the metro closed Exit B to cooperate with the construction of the transfer passageway. On 9 December 2023, part of the passage of the Line 5 concourse was also closed to cooperate with the access project of the Line 11 concourse. On 3 July 2024, the station completed the "three rights" transfer.

On 28 December 2024, Line 11 began operations, and the station became an interchange station.
