= Xichang station =

Guangzhou Metro station

Coordinates: 23.1375°N 113.2373°E

Xichang 西场
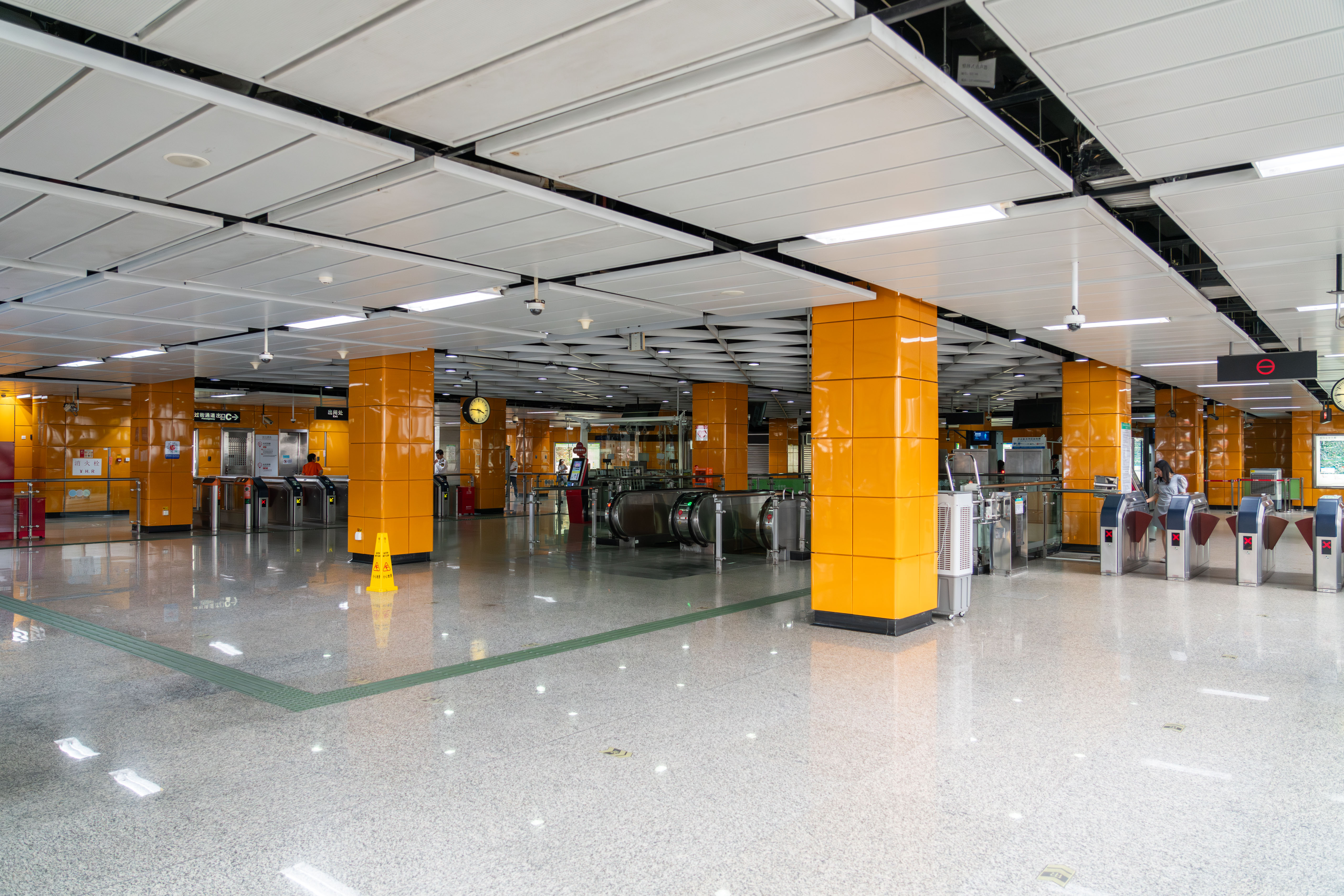
- Concourse of Xichang

Chinese name
- Simplified Chinese: 西场站
- Traditional Chinese: 西場站
Transcriptions
Standard Mandarin
- Hanyu Pinyin: Xīcháng Zhàn
Yue: Cantonese
- Yale Romanization: Sāichèuhng Jaahm
- Jyutping: Sai^{1}coeng^{4} Zaam^{6}

General information
- Location: Liwan District, Guangzhou, Guangdong; China
- Operated by: Guangzhou Metro Co. Ltd.
- Lines: Line 5; Line 13 (2026)
- Platforms: 2 (1 split island platform)
- Tracks: 2

Construction
- Structure type: Underground
- Accessible: Yes

Other information
- Station code: 504

History
- Opened: 28 December 2009; 16 years ago

Services
Preceding station	Guangzhou Metro	Following station
Zhongshanba towards Jiaokou	Line 5	Xicun towards Huangpu New Port
Future services
Luochongwei towards Chaoyang	Line 13	Caihong Bridge towards Xinsha
Location

Xichang Station (simplified Chinese: 西场站; traditional Chinese: 西場站; Cantonese Yale: Sāichèuhng Jaahm), formerly Dongfeng Road West Station (东风西路站; 東風西路站; Dūngfūng Sāi Louh Jaahm) during planning, is a station on Line 5 of the Guangzhou Metro. It is located under the junction of Huanshi Road West (环市西路) and Dongfeng Road West (东风西路) in the Liwan District of Guangzhou. Huanshi Road West is the main shopping area for shoes in the city. The station opened on 28 December 2009.
