= Tanwei station =

Guangzhou Metro interchange station

Tanwei 坦尾
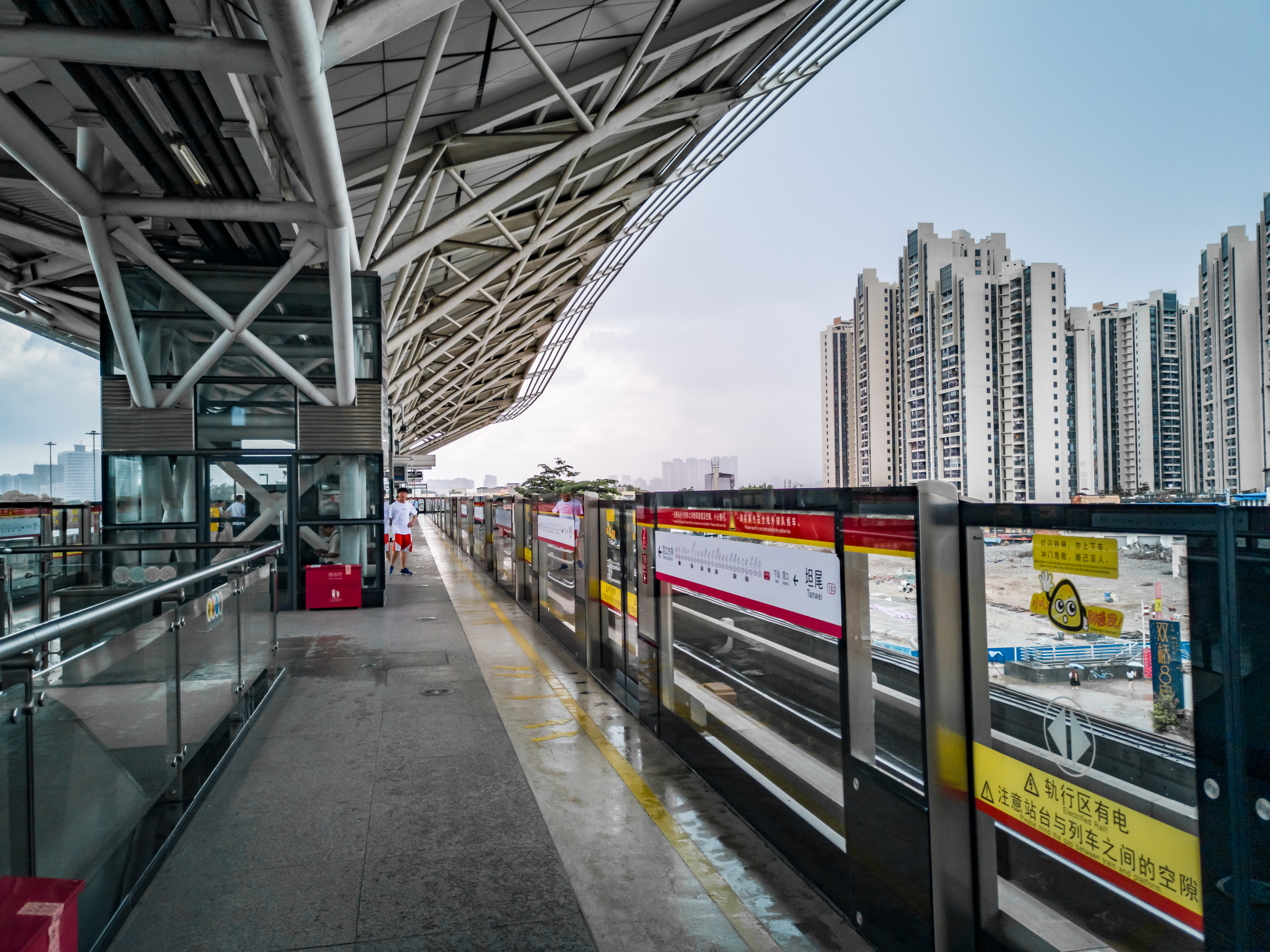
- Line 5 platform

Chinese name
- Chinese: 坦尾站
Transcriptions
Yue: Cantonese
- Jyutping: taan^{2} mei^{5} zaam^{6}
- Hong Kong Romanization: Tan Mei station

General information
- Location: Liwan District, Guangzhou, Guangdong; China
- Coordinates: 23.1256°N 113.2176°E
- Operated by: Guangzhou Metro Co. Ltd.
- Lines: Line 5; Line 6
- Platforms: 4 (1 island platform and 2 side platforms)
- Tracks: 4

Construction
- Structure type: Elevated (Line 5); Underground (Line 6)
- Accessible: Yes

Other information
- Station code: 502 605

History
- Opened: 28 December 2009; 16 years ago (Line 5); 28 December 2013; 12 years ago (Line 6)

Services
Preceding station	Guangzhou Metro	Following station
Jiaokou Terminus	Line 5	Zhongshanba towards Huangpu New Port
Hesha towards Xunfenggang	Line 6	Ruyifang towards Xiangxue
Location

Tanwei Station (Chinese: 坦尾站; Jyutping: taan^{2} mei^{5} zaam^{6}; Cantonese Yale: Táanméih Jaahm), formerly Datansha South Station (大坦沙南站; Daaihtáansā Nàahm Jaahm) and Datansha Station (大坦沙站; Daaihtáansā Jaahm) during planning, is an elevated station on Line 5 of the Guangzhou Metro and an underground station on Line 6. It is located at Zhongshuangqiao Park (中双桥公园) on Datansha Island in the Liwan District. It opened on 28 December 2009. It became an interchange station between Line 5 and Line 6 on 28 December 2013.

== Station layout ==
F3; Platforms	Platform 2	5 towards Jiaokou (Terminus)
F3; Platforms	Island platform, doors will open on the left
F3; Platforms	Platform 1	5 towards Huangpu New Port (Zhongshanba)
L2; Concourse	Mezzanine Lobby	Ticket Machines, Customer Service, Police Station, Safety Facilities
L2; Concourse	-	Pedestrian overpass, Shops
G Concourse	Ground Lobby	Ticket Machines, Customer Service, Safety Facilities; Transfer between Lines 5 & 6
G Concourse	Equipment Area	Station equipment, Toilet
L1; Concourse & Platforms	East Lobby	Ticket Machines, Customer Service, Safety Facilities
L1; Concourse & Platforms	Side platform, doors will open on the right
L1; Concourse & Platforms	Platform 4	6 towards Xunfenggang (Hesha)
L1; Concourse & Platforms	Platform 3	6 towards Xiangxue (Ruyifang)
L1; Concourse & Platforms	Side platform, doors will open on the right
L1; Concourse & Platforms	West Lobby	Ticket Machines, Customer Service, Safety Facilities

== Exits ==
Exit number	Exit location
Exit B	Shuangqiao Lu
Exit C	Shuangqiao Lu
Exit D	Qiaozhong Zhonglu
Exit F	Shuangqiao Lu
Exit G	Qiaozhong Zhonglu
Exit I	Qiaozhong Nanlu
Exit J	Qiaozhong Nanlu

== Gallery ==
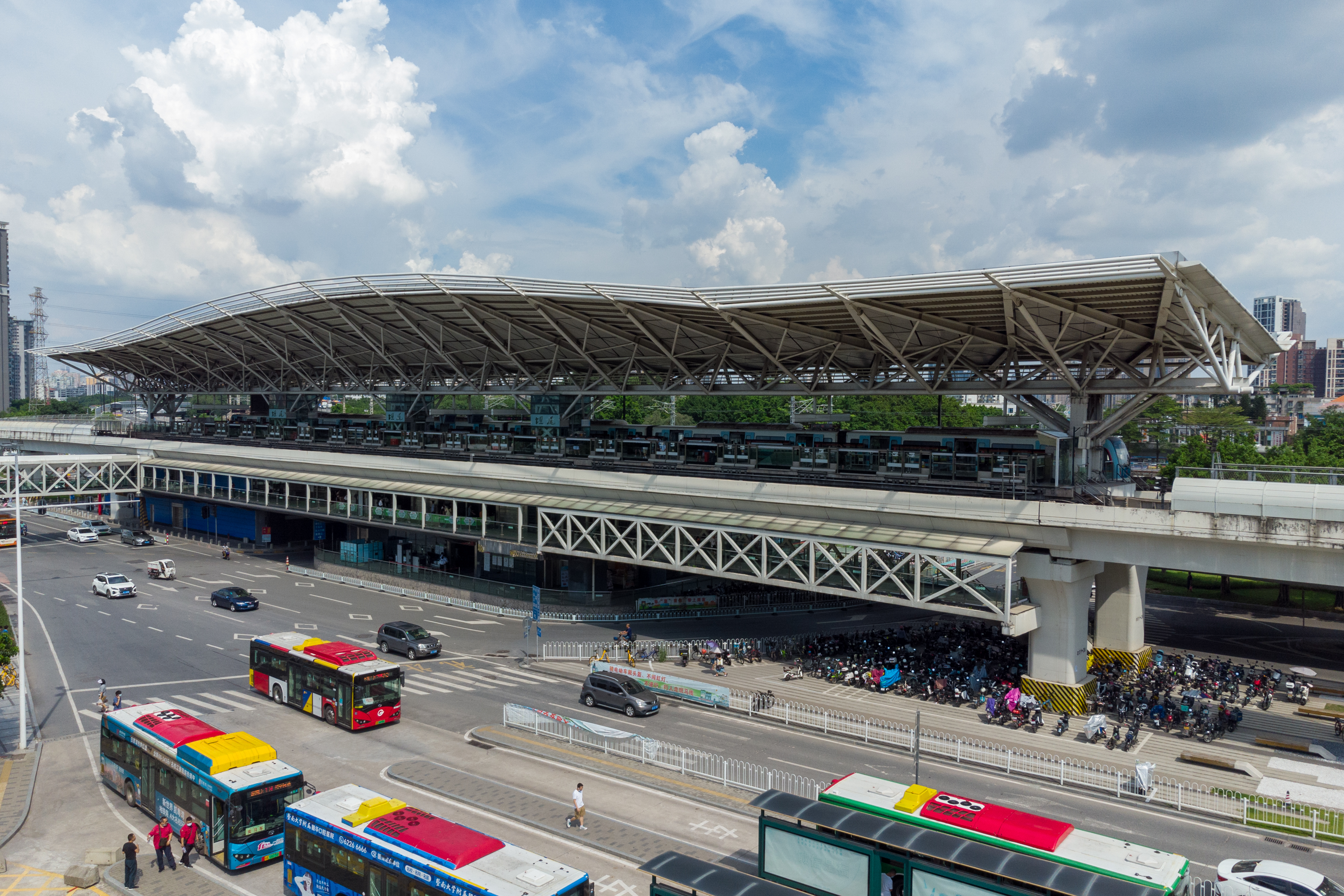
Line 5 exterior

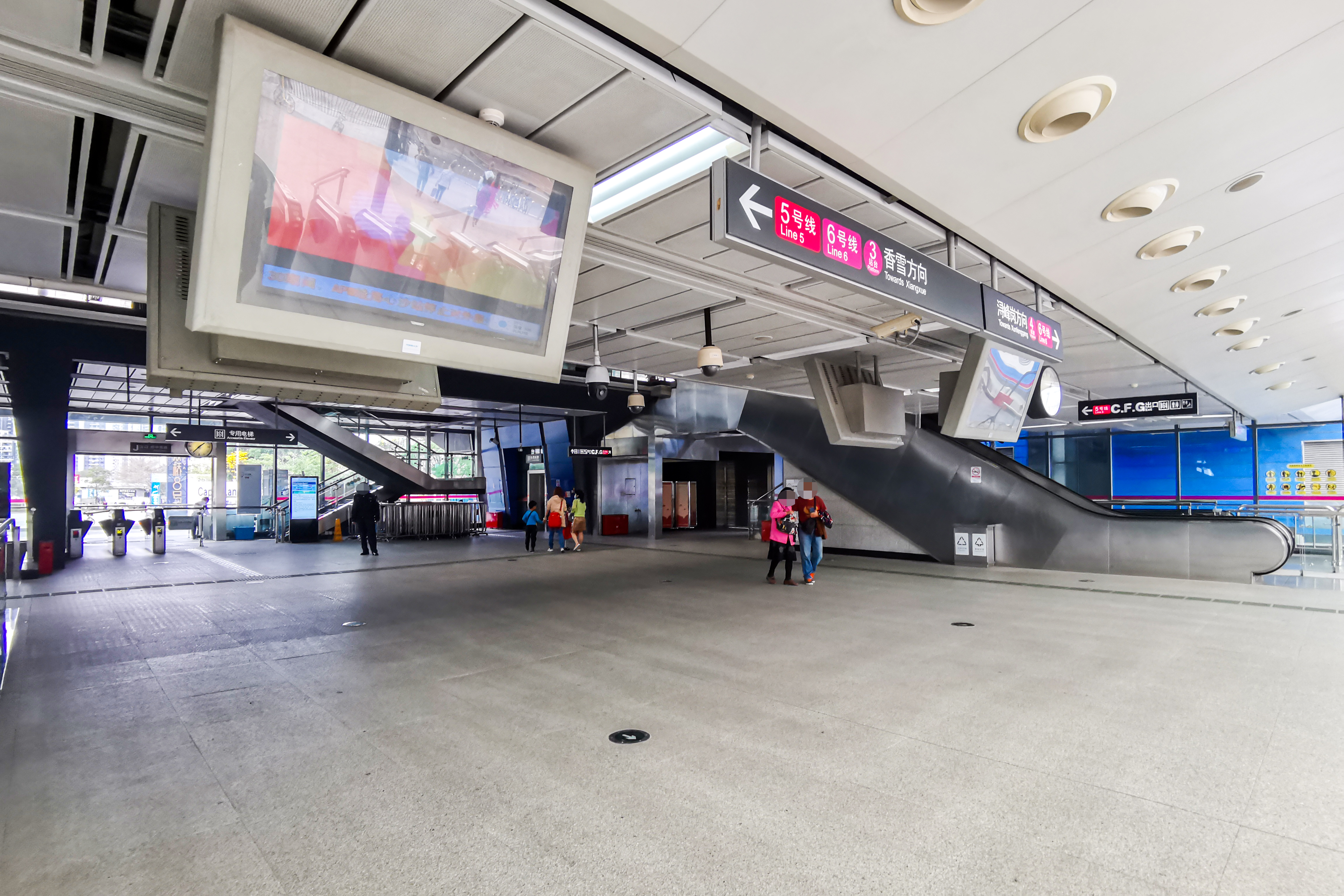
Concourse L1 (Line 5)

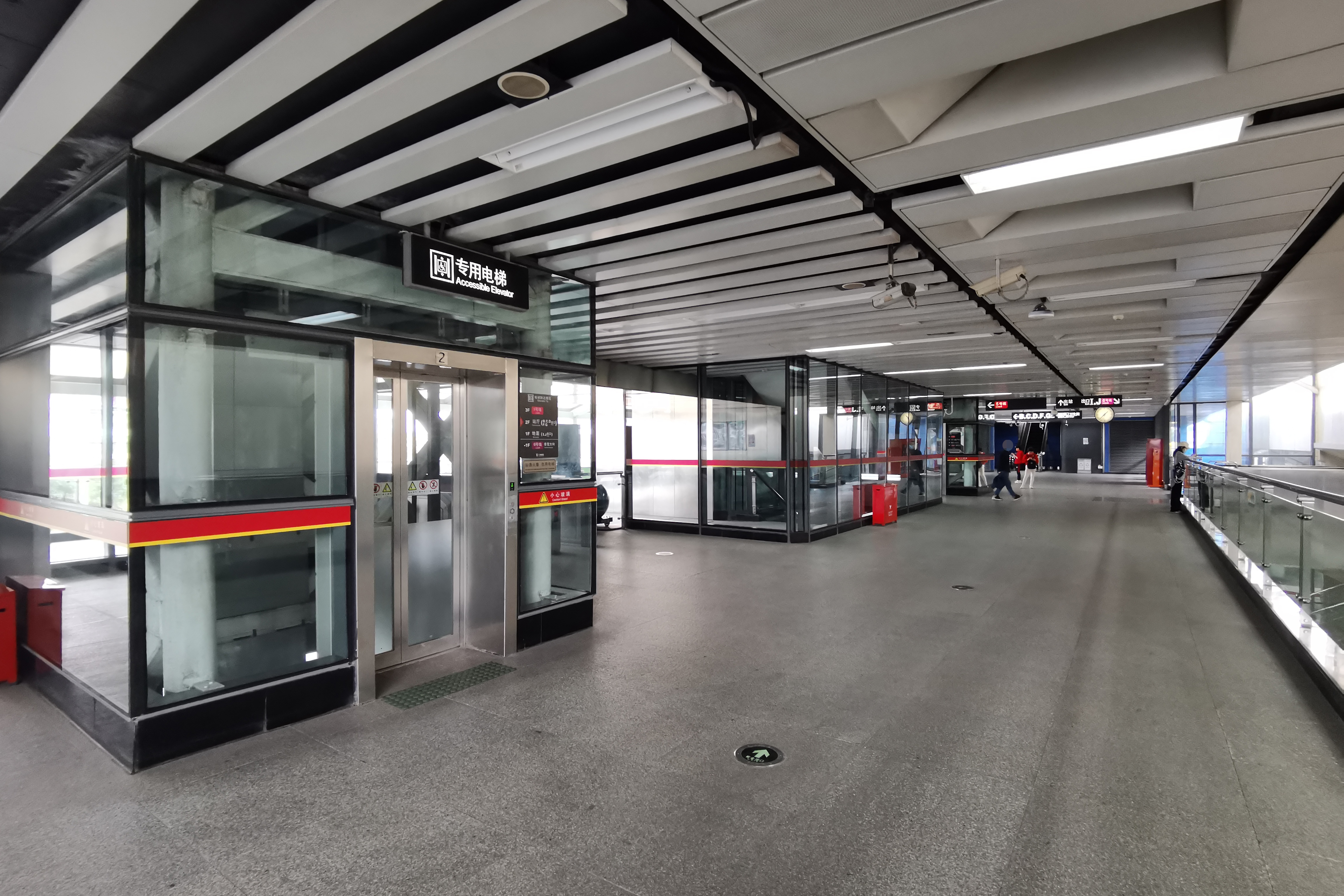
Concourse L2 (Line 6)

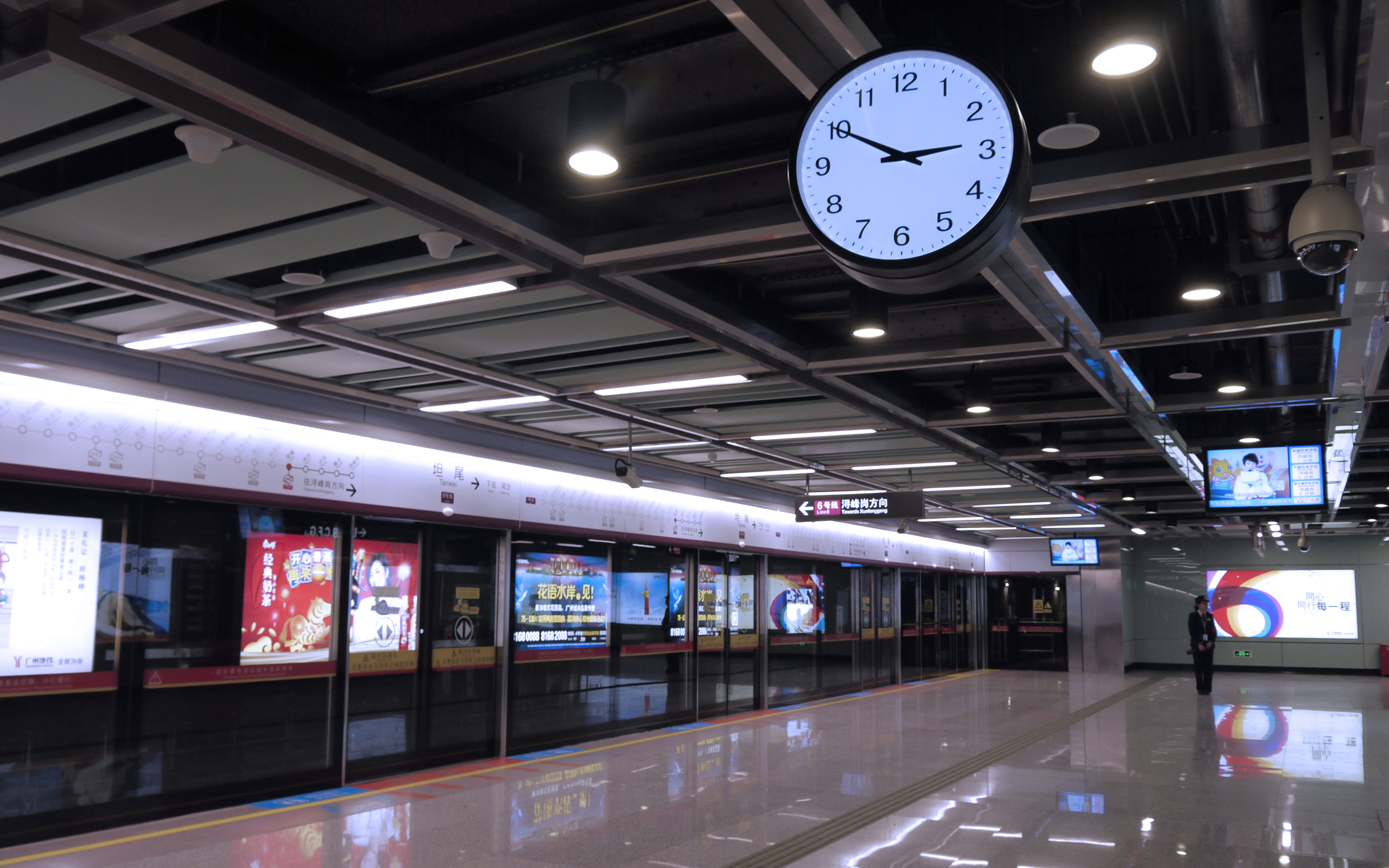
Platform 4 (Line 6 towards Xunfenggang)

== Others ==
Another station in Line 6 on Datansha Island, Datansha North Station (大坦沙北站; Daaihtáansā Bāk Jaahm) was renamed as Hesha Station (河沙站; Hòhsā Jaahm).
