= Dashadi station =

Guangzhou Metro station

Coordinates: 23.10347°N 113.44664°E

Dashadi 大沙地
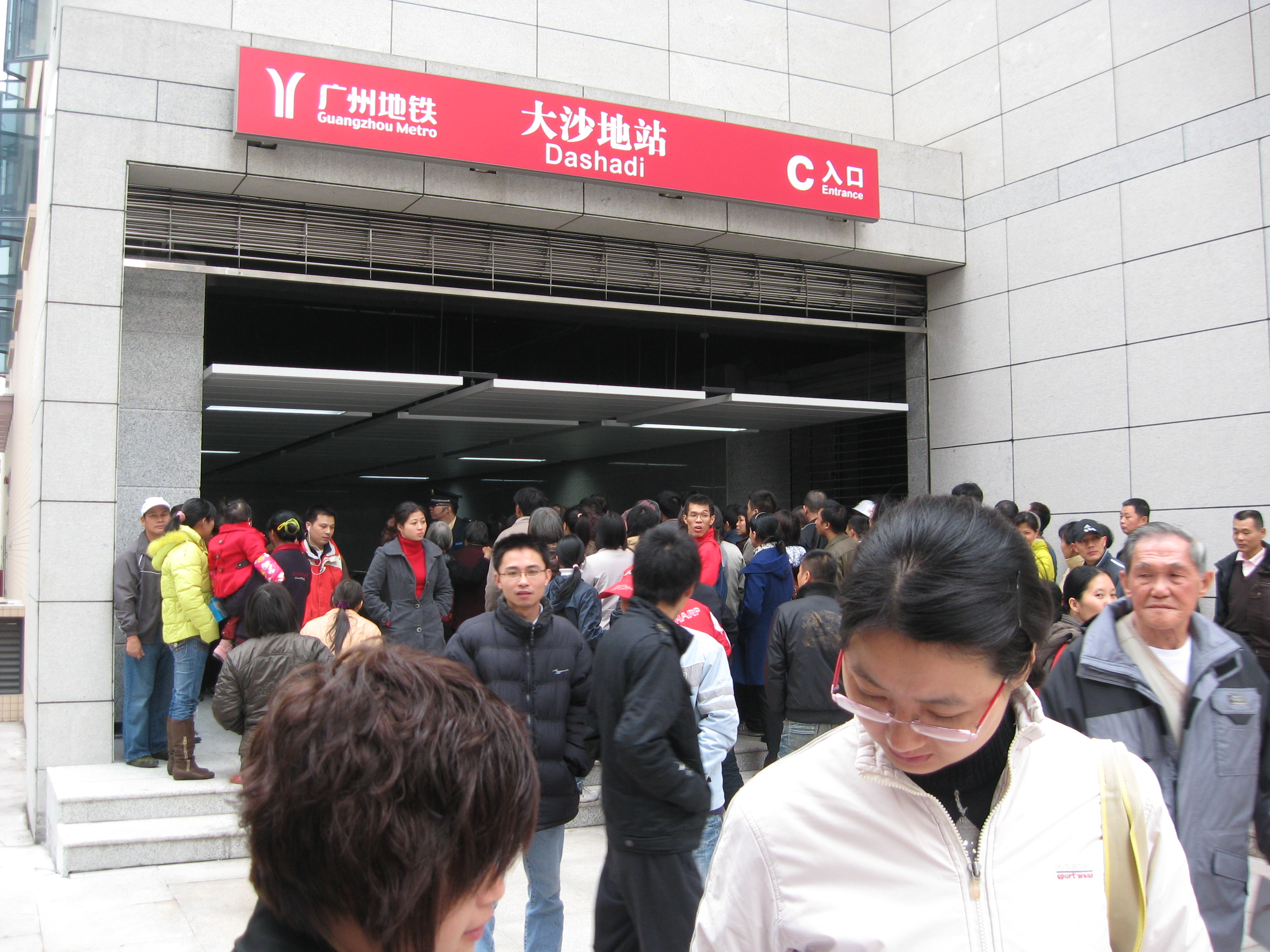

Chinese name
- Chinese: 大沙地站
Transcriptions
Standard Mandarin
- Hanyu Pinyin: Dàshādì Zhàn
Yue: Cantonese
- Jyutping: daai^{6}saa^{1}dei^{6} zaam^{6}

General information
- Location: Dashadi West Road (大沙地西路) and Gangwan Road (港湾路); Huangpu District, Guangzhou, Guangdong; China
- Operated by: Guangzhou Metro Co. Ltd.
- Line: Line 5
- Platforms: 2 (1 island platform)

Construction
- Structure type: Underground
- Accessible: yes

Other information
- Station code: 522

History
- Opened: 28 December 2009; 16 years ago

Services
Preceding station	Guangzhou Metro	Following station
Yuzhu towards Jiaokou	Line 5	Dashadong towards Huangpu New Port
Location

Dashadi Station (Chinese: 大沙地站; pinyin: Dàshādì Zhàn; Jyutping: daai^{6}saa^{1}dei^{6} zaam^{6}), formerly Gangwanlu Station (港湾路站) during planning, is a station on Line 5 of the Guangzhou Metro. It is located underground the junction of West Dashadi Road (大沙地西路) and Gangwan Road (港湾路), in the Huangpu District of Guangzhou, near Huangpu Police Station, Dashadi Shopping City and Huangpu Commercial City. It opened in December 2009.

== Gallery ==
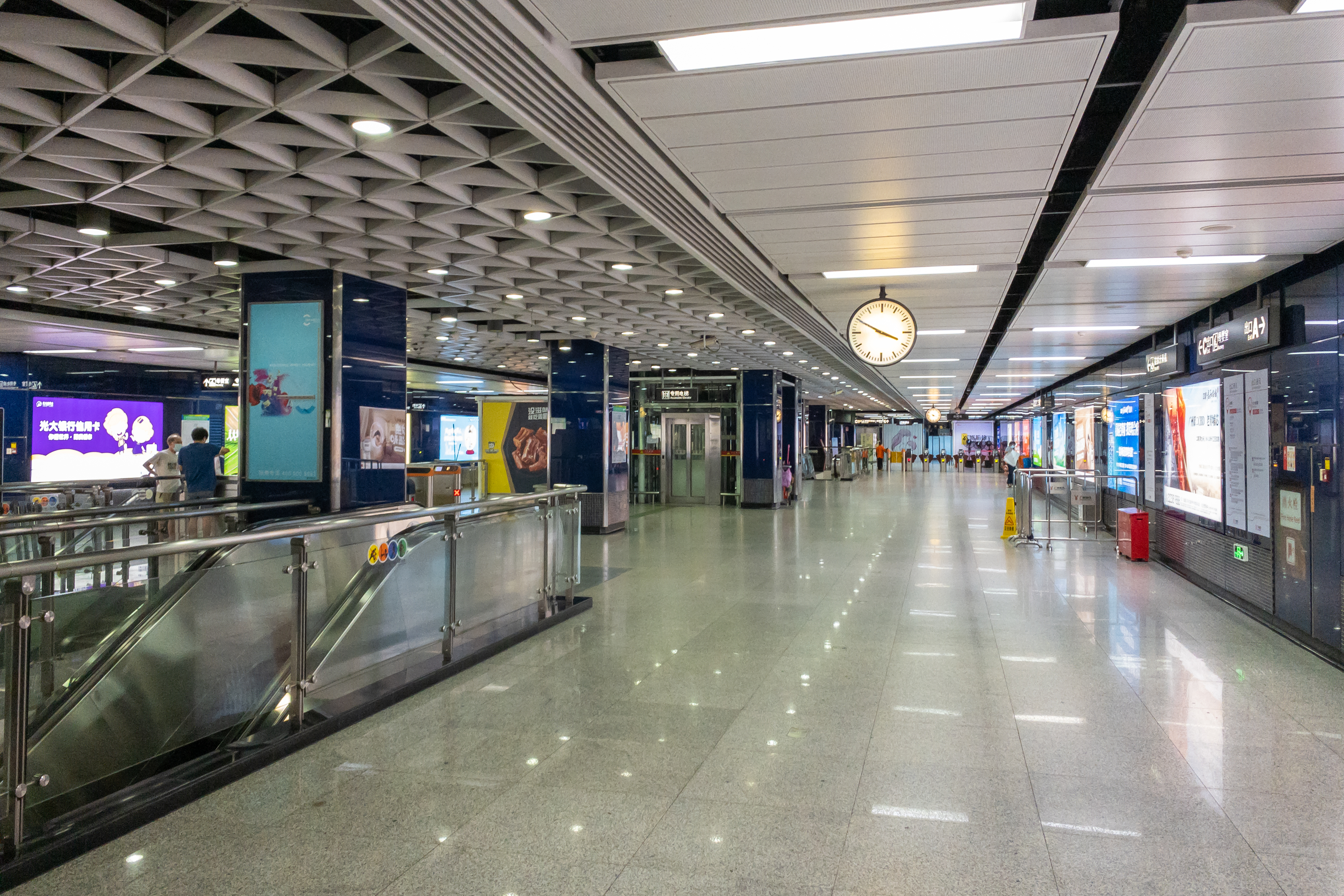
Concourse

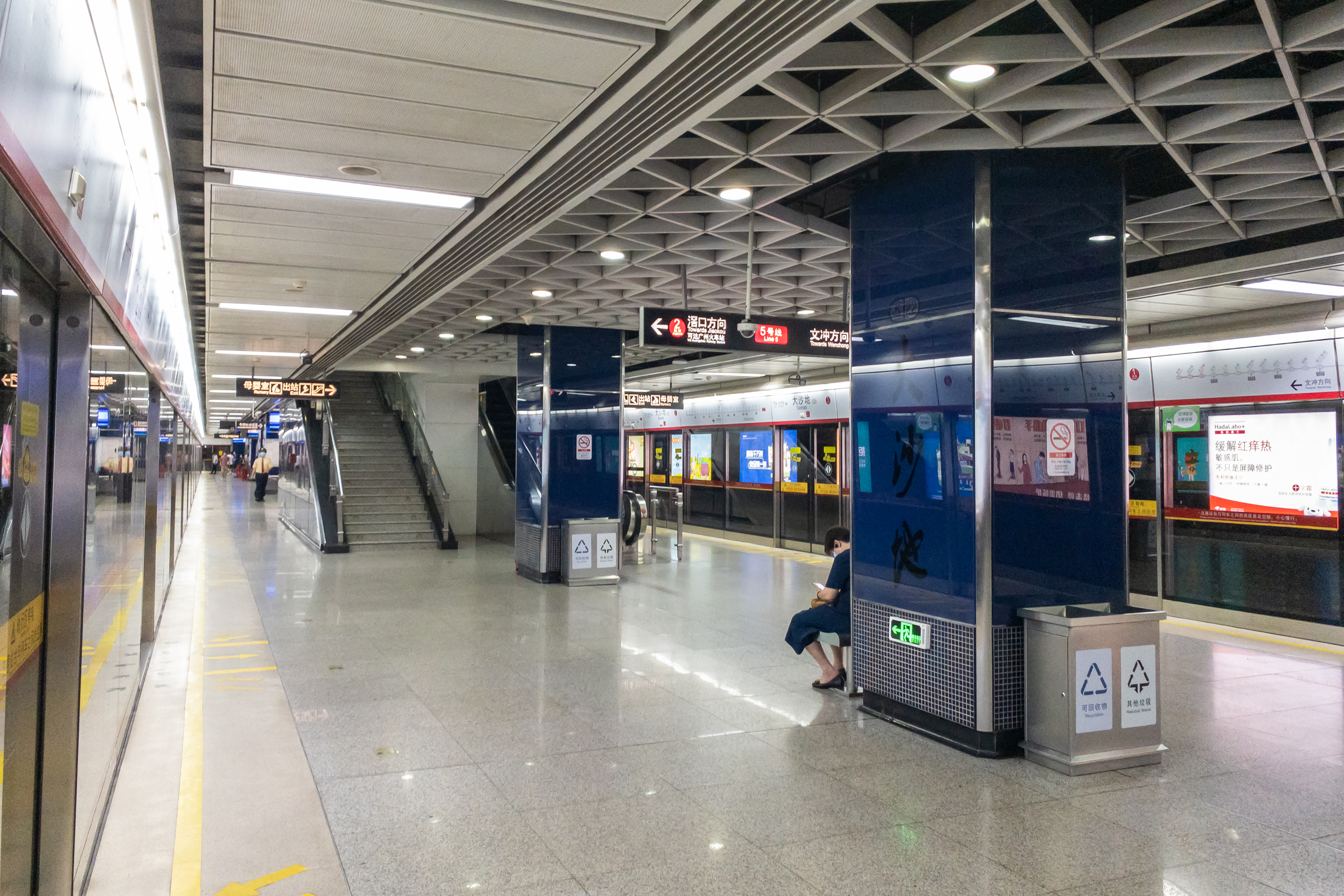
Platform 2
