= Wenchong station =

Guangzhou Metro Line 5 station

Wenchong 文冲
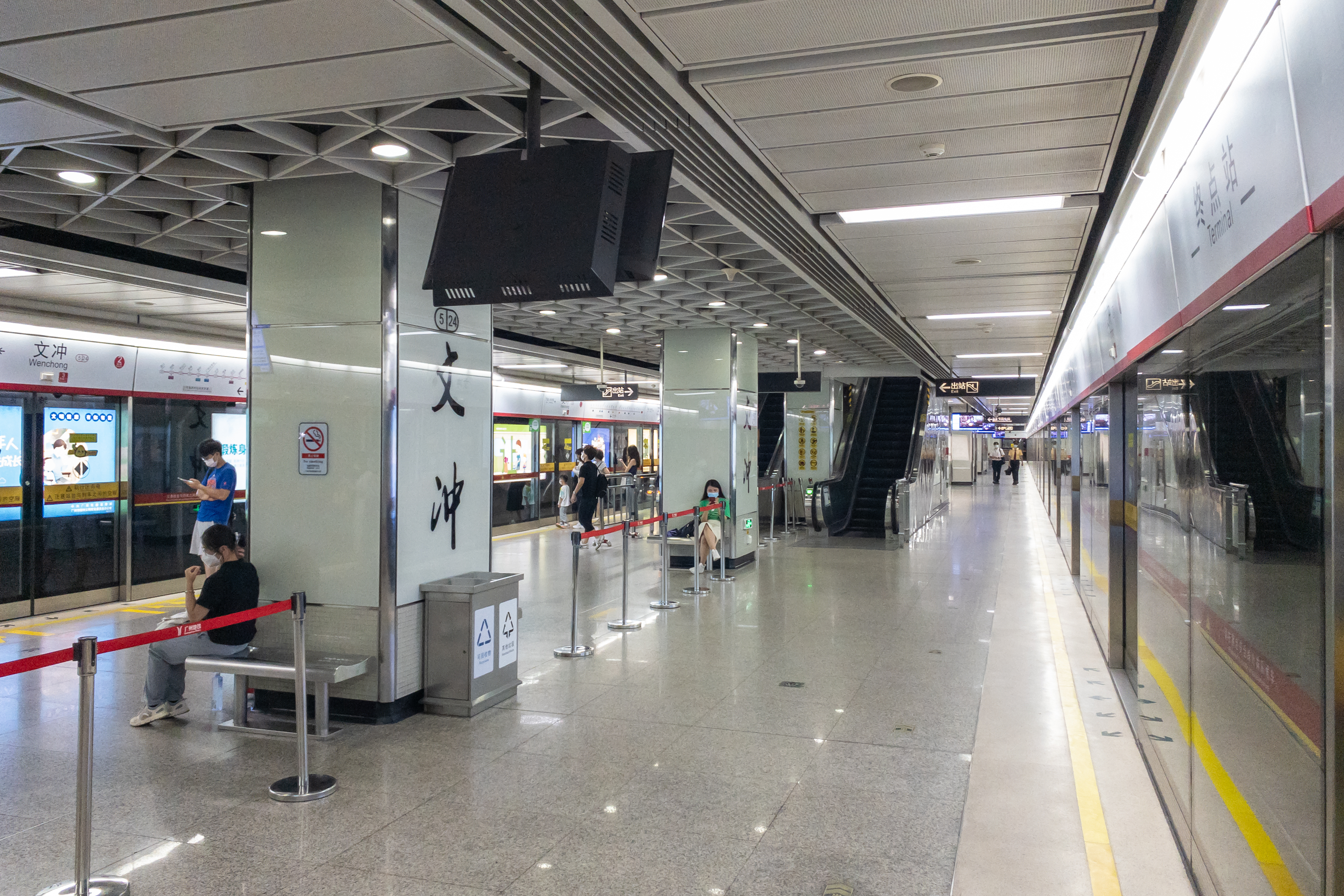
- Platform 1 (Line 5 termination platform, May 2022)

Chinese name
- Chinese: 文冲站
Transcriptions
Standard Mandarin
- Hanyu Pinyin: Wénchōng Zhàn
Yue: Cantonese
- Yale Romanization: Màhnchūng Jaahm
- Jyutping: Man^{4}cung^{1} Zaam^{6}

General information
- Location: Dashadi East Road (大沙地东路) and Shihua Road (石化路); Huangpu District, Guangzhou, Guangdong; China
- Coordinates: 23°6′22.6440″N 113°27′48.7076″E
- Operator: Guangzhou Metro Co. Ltd.
- Line: Line 5
- Platforms: 2 (1 island platform)
- Tracks: 2

Construction
- Structure type: Underground
- Accessible: Yes

Other information
- Station code: 524

History
- Opened: 28 December 2009 (16 years ago)

Services
| Preceding station | Guangzhou Metro | Following station |
|---|---|---|
| Dashadong towards Jiaokou | Line 5 | Shuangsha towards Huangpu New Port |
Location

Wenchong station (Chinese: 文冲站; pinyin: Wénchōng Zhàn; Cantonese Yale: Màhnchūng Jaahm), formerly Wenyuan station (文圆站) during planning and construction, is a station and the former terminus of Line 5 of the Guangzhou Metro. It is located under the junction of Dashadi Donglu (大沙地东路) and Shihua Lu (石化路), in the Huangpu District. It opened in December 2009, and was the eastern terminus of the line until 28 December 2023, when Line 5 was extended from Wenchong to Huangpu New Port.

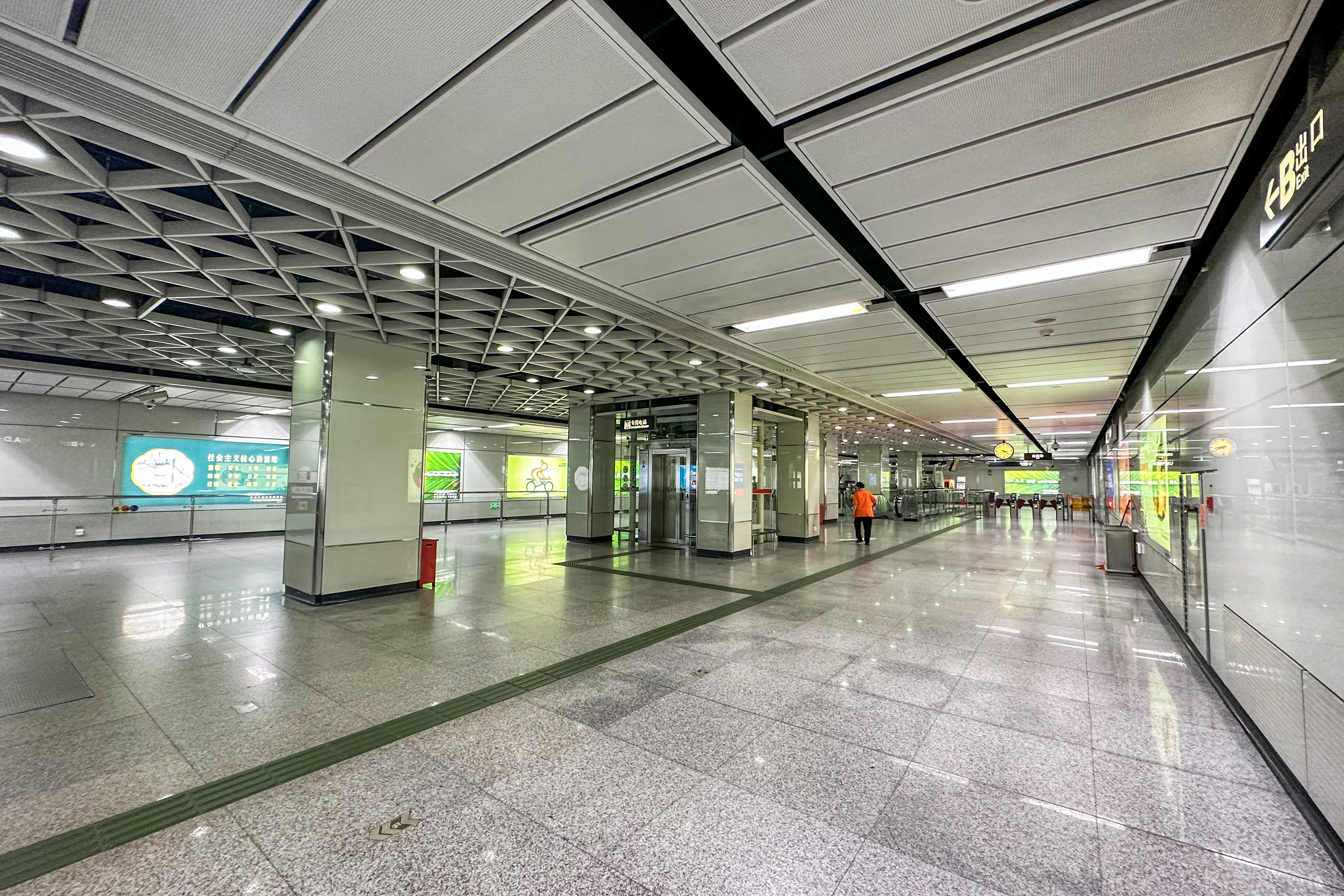
Concourse

== Station layout ==
| G | - | Exits A, B, D |
| L1; Concourse | Lobby | Ticket Machines, Customer Service, Shops, Police Station, Security Facilities |
| L2; Platforms | Platform 2 | 5 towards Jiaokou (Dashadong) |
| L2; Platforms | Island platform, doors will open on the left |
| L2; Platforms | Platform 1 | 5 towards Huangpu New Port (Shuangsha) |

=== Entrances/exits ===
The station has 3 points of entry/exit. Exit D is equipped with a stairlift.

- A: Dashadi East Road
- B: Shihua Road
- D: Shihua Road
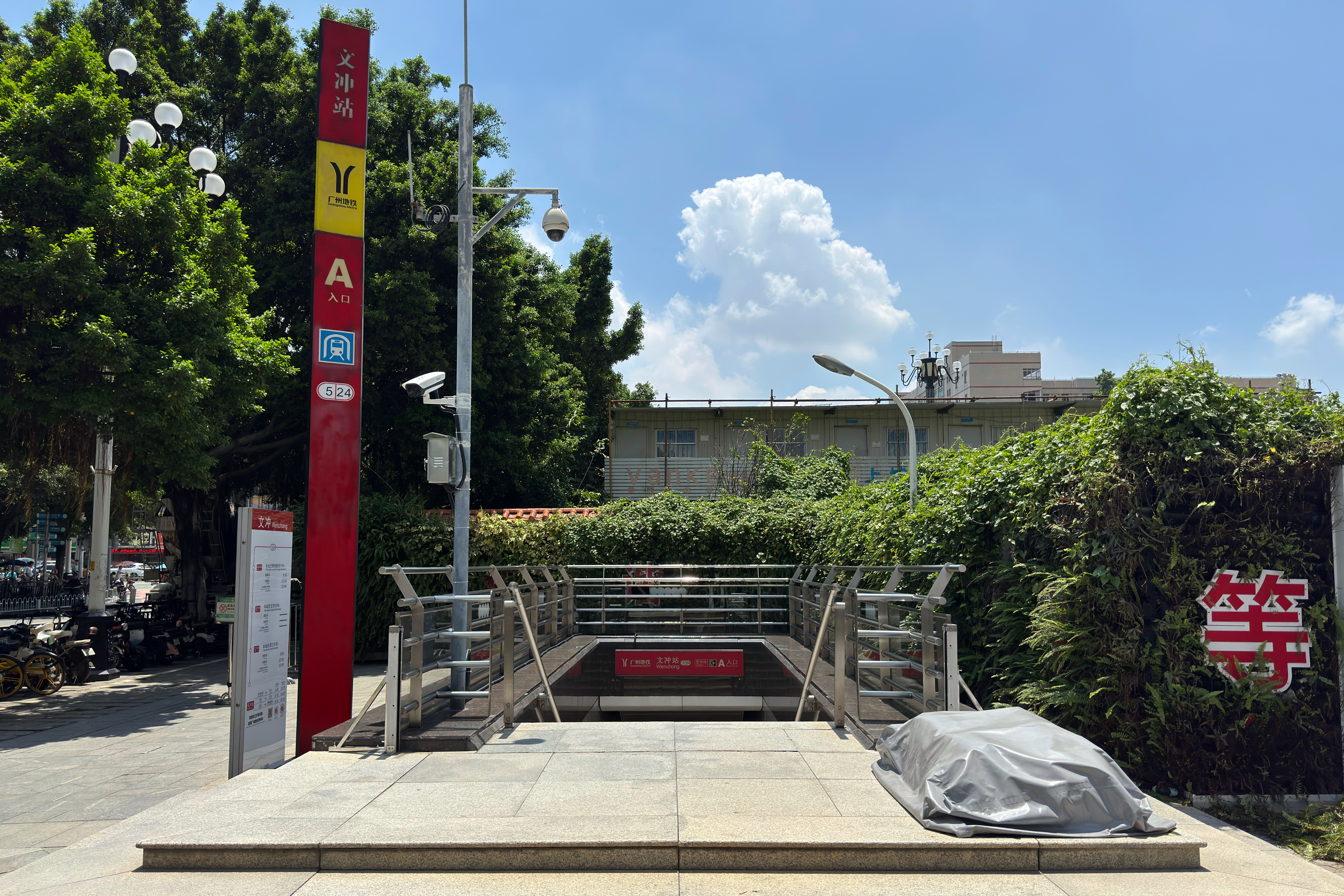
Entrance A

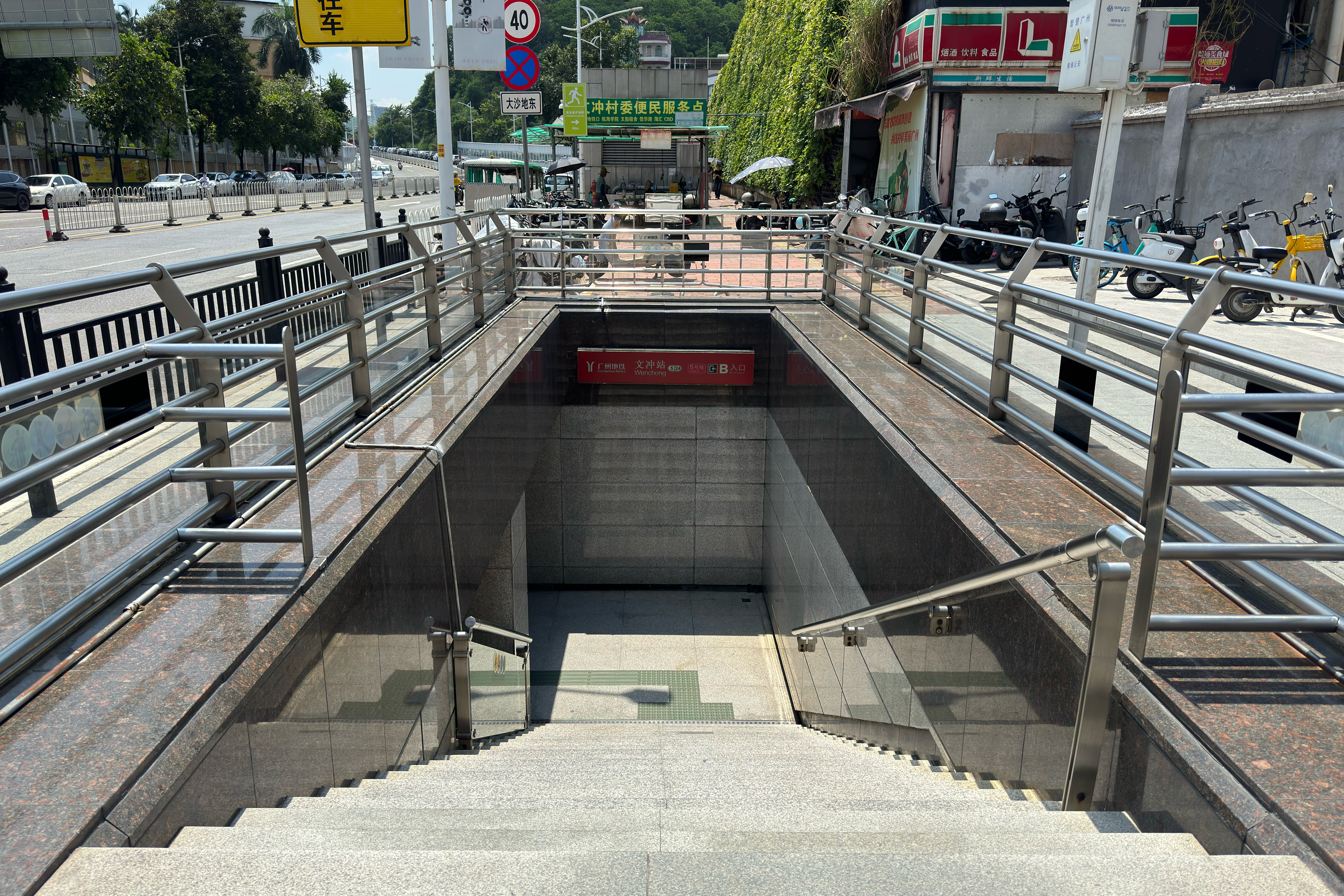
Entrance B

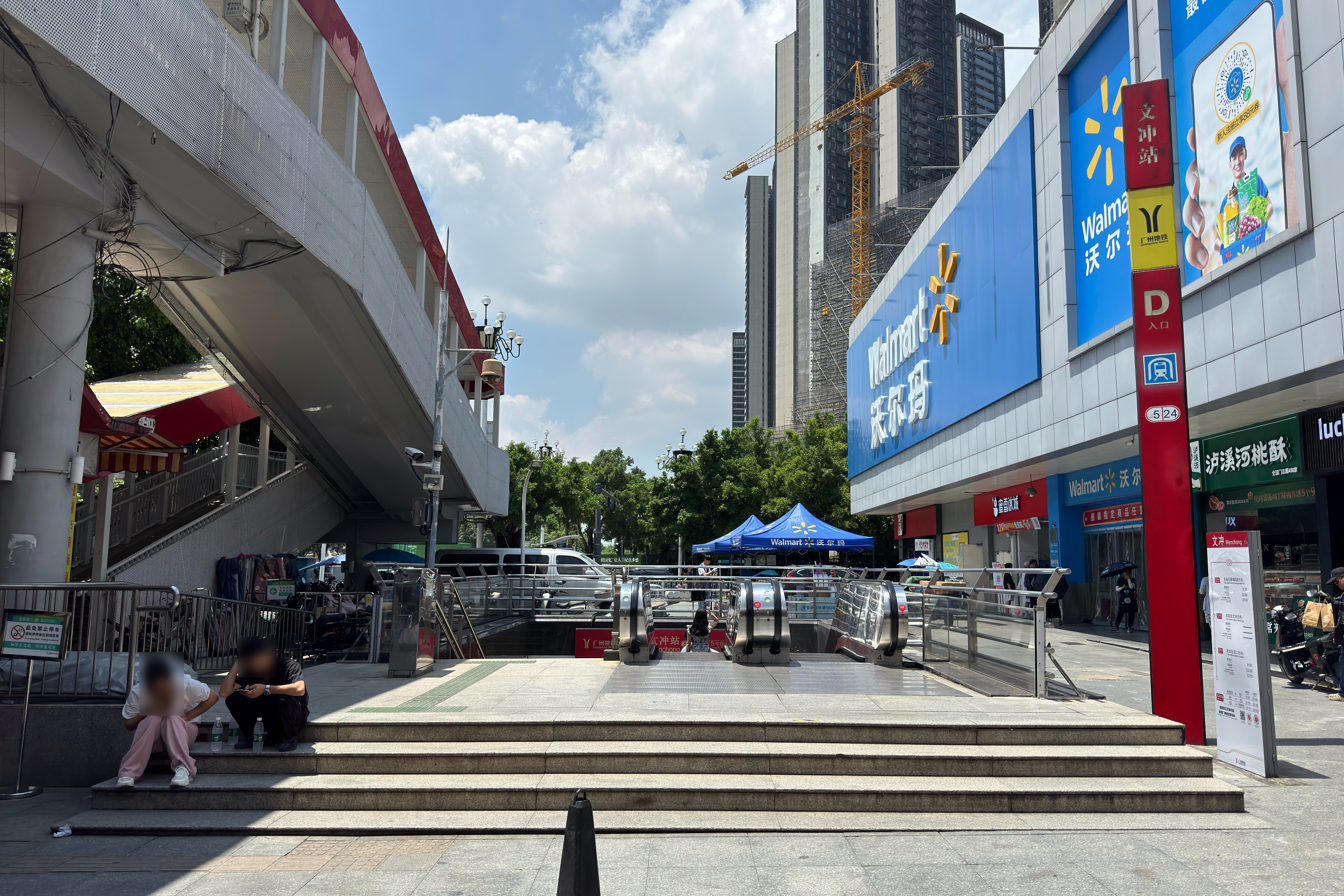
Entrance D

== Usage ==
The station is close to residential areas such as Shihua and some urban villages, and there is also the Guangzhou Maritime University one kilometer to the east.

Since the nearby bus station has a number of bus routes to the development zone, the east of Huangpu District, the Luogang area and other places, it attracts some passengers from the eastern district to connect buses to the above areas, so that the station has a large passenger flow on weekdays, and it will double during the morning and evening rush hours. However, with the opening of Line 13, this station is no longer the only subway station connected to the bus stop, so the flow of passengers in and out of the station has decreased.

In response to the opening of the back section of Line 21 exacerbating the passenger flow pressure of Line 5 during the morning rush hour, this station has implemented passenger flow control measures during the morning rush hour on weekdays since 18 December 2019. At present, the peak passenger flow hours of this station are from 7:30 a.m. to 9:10 a.m. on weekdays.

== History ==
=== Planning and construction ===
The station first appeared in the 2003 plan. During planning, Line 5 was changed to turn northeast to connect to Dashadi Road from the south side of Maogang Interchange, and then extend from east to west along Dasha Road, with this station also set up in the middle.

Subsequently, the station officially started construction in 2007. On 11 November 2008, the main structure topped out. On 28 June 2009, the station completed the "three rights" transfer. On 28 December 2009, the station opened with the opening of Line 5 and became its eastern terminus. On 28 December 2023, this station became an intermediate station of Line 5 with the opening of the eastern extension to Huangpu New Port.

=== Construction plan changes due to nail house demolition difficulty ===
The main double storage line and mainline part of the station at the east end of the station were originally planned to be built with an open-cut structure, but there was a nail house in the way. Because the owner was not satisfied with its demolition compensation, and the Huangpu District Construction Bureau could not accept the owner's excessively high conditions, so the house could not be demolished. In order to ensure that Line 5 was opened to traffic on time, the subway had to redesign the tunnel and change the previous open-cut structure to underground construction. After changing the design and construction, the right line of the underground tunnel of the turnback line broke through on 15 March 2008.

Within four years after the opening of the station, the extension of Dasha East Road was also opened, but the road suddenly changed from six lanes to two lanes in both directions when it reached the house. After that, the relevant government departments coordinated with the homeowner and reached an off-site resettlement agreement. On 8 October 2012, the house was requisitioned and demolished.
