= Dashadong station =

Guangzhou Metro station in China

Dashadong 大沙东
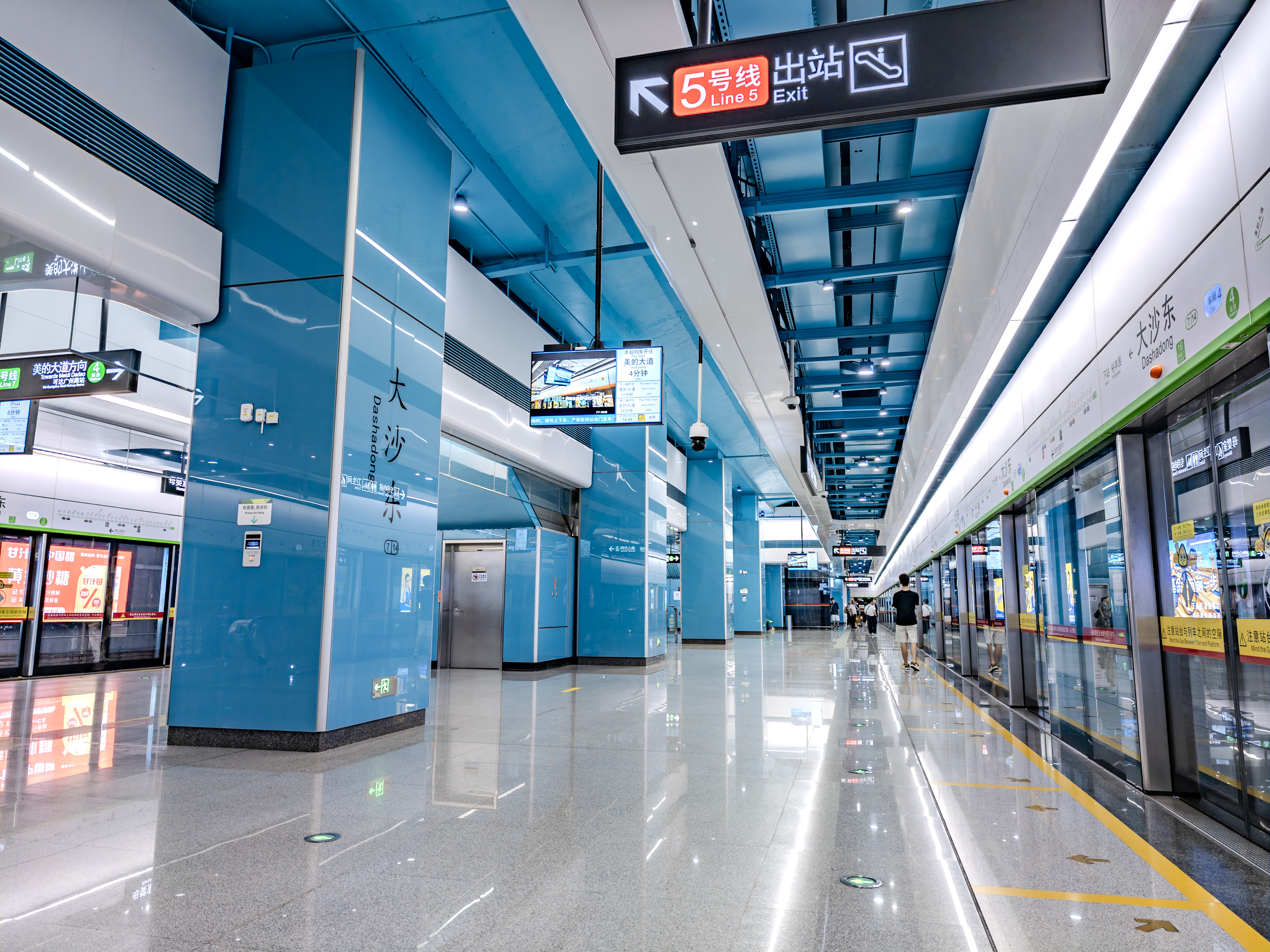
- Line 7 platform

Chinese name
- Simplified Chinese: 大沙东站
- Traditional Chinese: 大沙東站
- Literal meaning: Dasha East Station
Transcriptions
Standard Mandarin
- Hanyu Pinyin: Dàshādōng Zhàn
Yue: Cantonese
- Yale Romanization: Daaihsāa Dūng Jaahm
- Jyutping: Daai^{6}saa^{1} Dung^{1} zaam^{6}

General information
- Location: Dashadi East Road (大沙地东路) and Zhendong Road (镇东路); Huangpu District, Guangzhou, Guangdong; China
- Coordinates: 23°6′30.93″N 113°27′11.73″E
- Operator: Guangzhou Metro Co. Ltd.
- Lines: Line 5; Line 7
- Platforms: 4 (2 island platforms)
- Tracks: 4

Construction
- Structure type: Underground
- Accessible: Yes

Other information
- Station code: 523 714

History
- Opened: Line 5: 28 December 2009 (16 years ago); Line 7: 28 December 2023 (2 years ago)

Services
Preceding station	Guangzhou Metro	Following station
Dashadi towards Jiaokou	Line 5	Wenchong towards Huangpu New Port
Yufengwei towards Meidi Dadao	Line 7	Jitang towards Yanshan
Location

Dashadong Station (simplified Chinese: 大沙东站; traditional Chinese: 大沙東站; pinyin: Dàshādōng Zhàn; Cantonese Yale: Daaihsāa Dūng Jaahm), formerly Dashadi Station (大沙地站) during planning, is an interchange station between Line 5 and Line 7 of the Guangzhou Metro. It is located underground the junction of East Dashadi Road (大沙地东路) and Zhendong Road (镇东路), in the Huangpu District. Line 5 opened on 28 December 2009, whilst Line 7 opened on 28 December 2023.

== Station layout ==
The station is currently divided into two stations: Line 5 station under Dasha East Road and Line 7 station under Zhendong Road. The station is surrounded by Dasha East Road, Guangxin Road, Zhendong Road, Huangpu District Customs Building, Huangpu District People's Court and other nearby buildings.

In addition, the station has two toilets and a nursery room, which are located in the non-fare paid area near the end of the transfer passage near Line 5 and the head end of the Line 7 platform towards Meidi Dadao.

=== Line 5 ===
The Line 5 station has three underground floors. The first floor is the station concourse, the second floor is the equipment level, and the third floor is the Line 5 platform.

G	-	Exits A, C
L1; Concourse	Lobby	Ticket Machines, Customer Service, Shops, Police Station, Security Facilities; Transfer passageway to Line 7
L2; Equipment Area	-	Station Equipment
L3; Platforms	Platform 2	5 towards Jiaokou (Dashadi)
L3; Platforms	Island platform, doors will open on the left
L3; Platforms	Platform 1	5 towards Huangpu New Port (Wenchong)

=== Line 7 ===
The Line 7 station has four underground floors. The first floor is the concourse and transfer passage, the second and third floors are the station equipment levels, and the fourth floor is the Line 7 platform. It is the deepest station on the Phase 2 extension of Line 7.

G	-	Exits D, E
Mezzanine	Exit F buffer level	Security check, Towards exit F and transfer passageway
L1; Concourse	Lobby	Ticket Machines, Customer Service, Shops, Police Station, Security Facilities
L1; Concourse	Transfer passageway	Transfer passageway to Line 5 Toilets, Nursery (non-paid area)
L2; Equipment Area	-	Station Equipment
L3; Buffer Level	-	Station Equipment, towards concourse and platforms
L4; Platforms	Platform 4	7 towards Meidi Dadao (Yufengwei)
L4; Platforms	Island platform, doors will open on the left (Toilets, Nursery)
L4; Platforms	Platform 3	7 towards Yanshan (Jitang)

=== Concourse and transfer ===
The Line 5 and 7 stations each have a concourse, both located on the first floor, and the two concourses are connected by a transfer passage. To facilitate transfers, the north side of the station hall of Line 5 and the east side of the station hall of Line 7 are divided into fare paid areas, and the transfer passage is also divided into non-fare paid and fare paid areas, whilst there are automatic pedestrian walkways within the fare paid area.

The Line 5 concourse has escalators, stairs and 1 elevator for passengers to travel to and from the platforms. Since the platform of Line 7 is located deep underground, each of the three groups of 2 escalators in the paid area of the concourse are connected to their respective platform levels, and there are 2 escalators connecting to the platform at the platform level. There is also an elevator directly connected to the platform in the middle of the concourse fare paid area, and a set of stairs on the north side within said area that can also be directly connected to the platform.

There are intelligent customer service centers and ticket vending machines in both station concourses, as well as convenience stores in the non-fare paid area of the Line 5 concourse and bakery shops in the non-fare paid area of the Line 7 concourse.

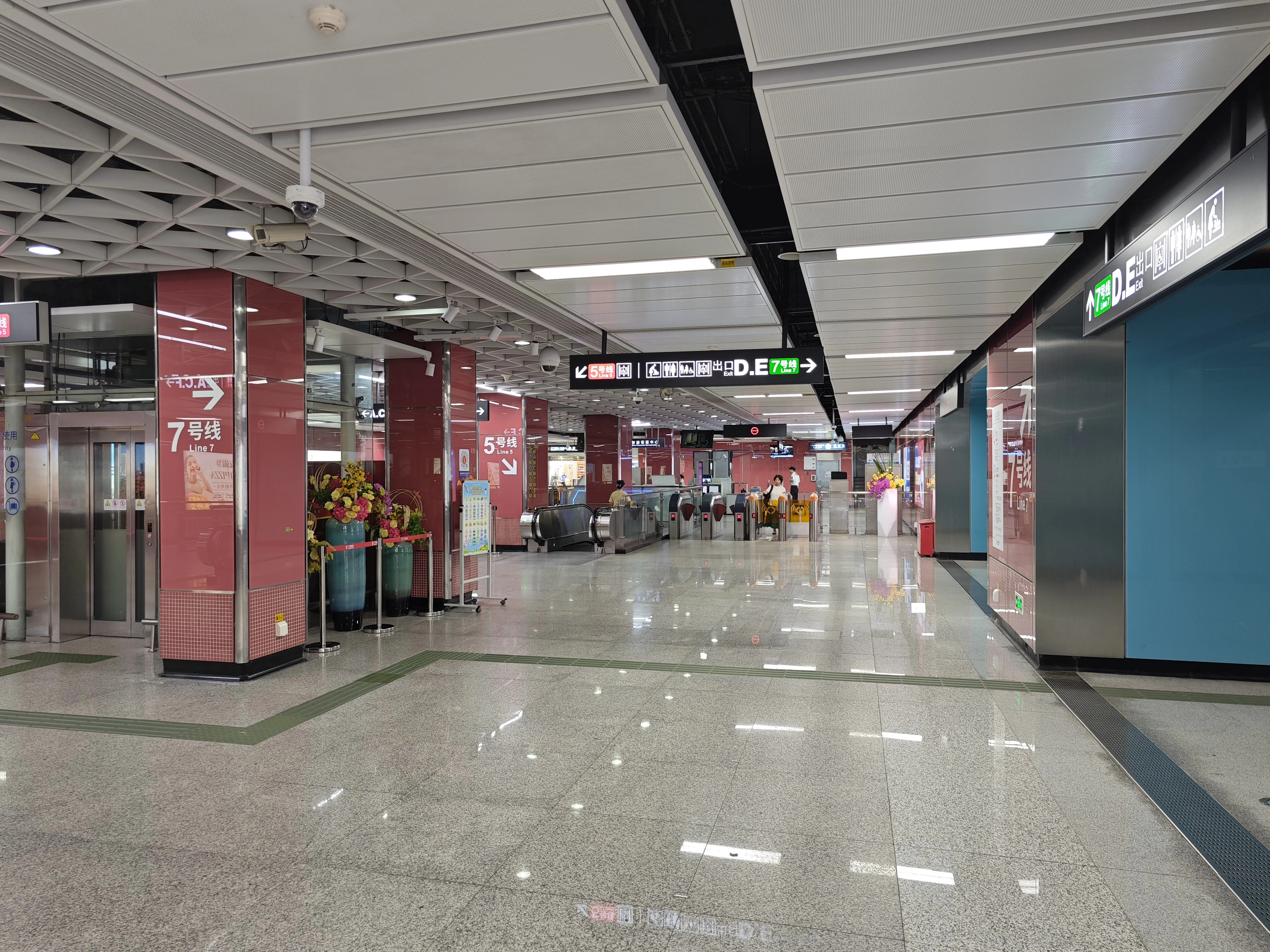
Line 5 concourse

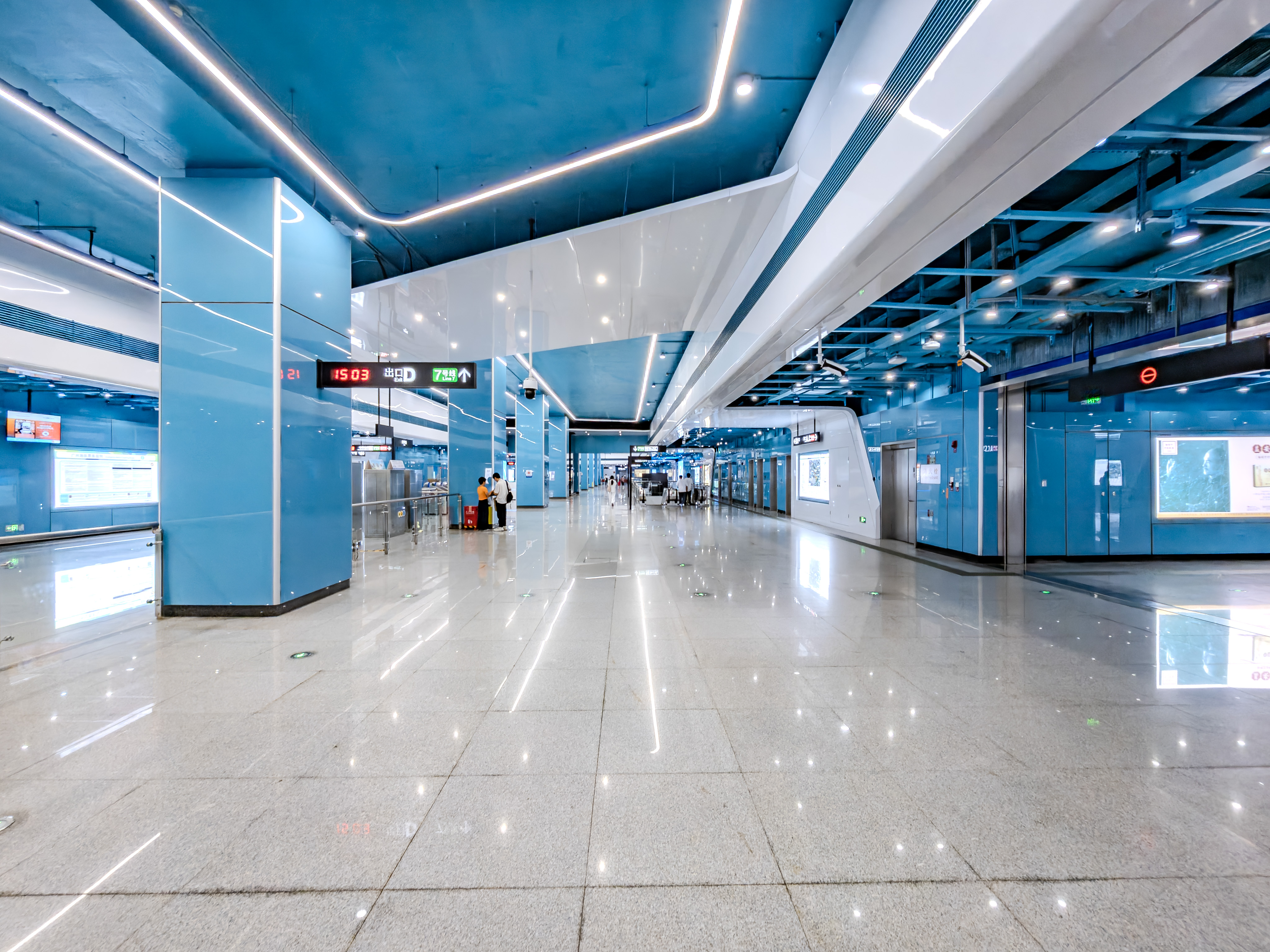
Line 7 concourse

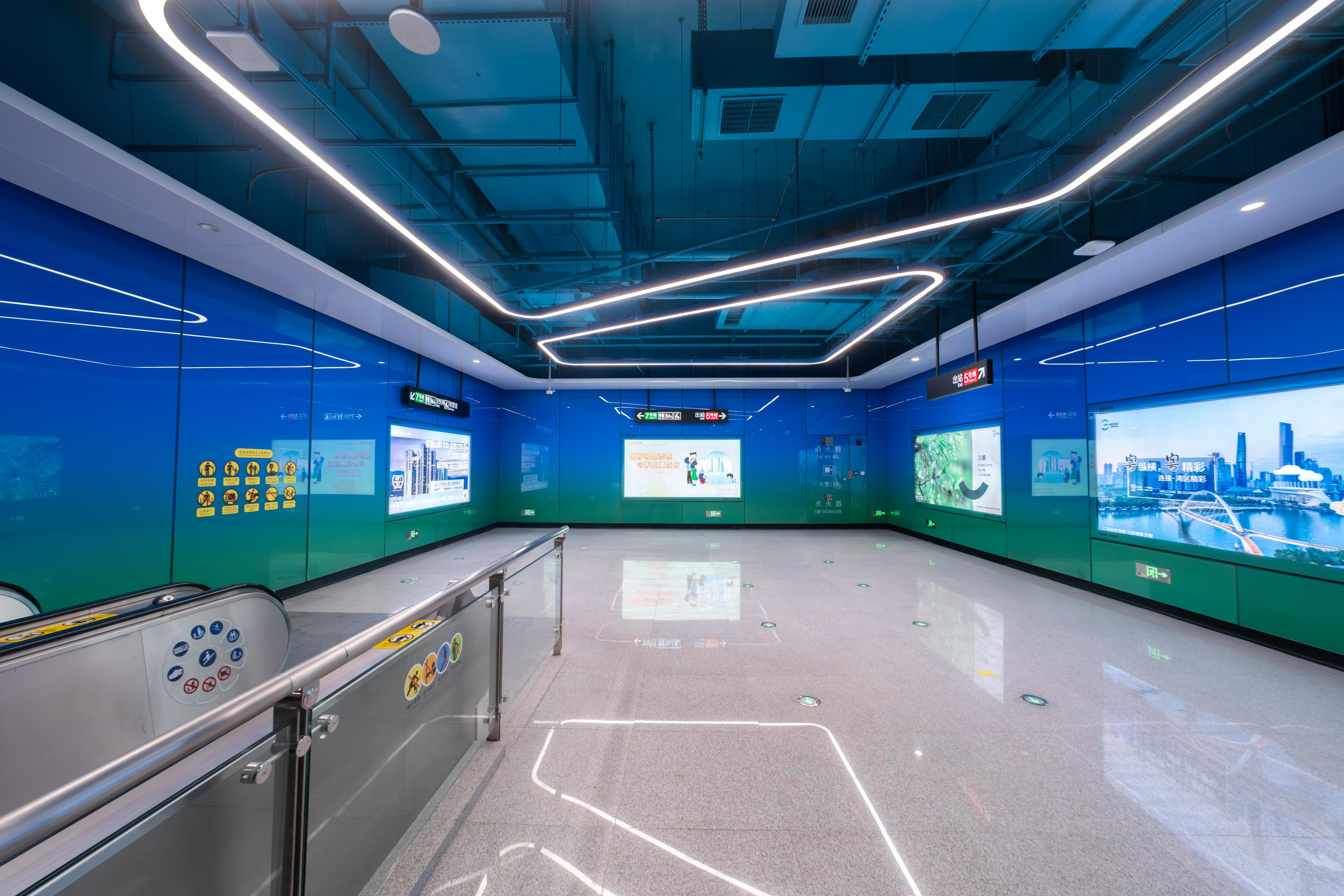
Line 7 buffer area

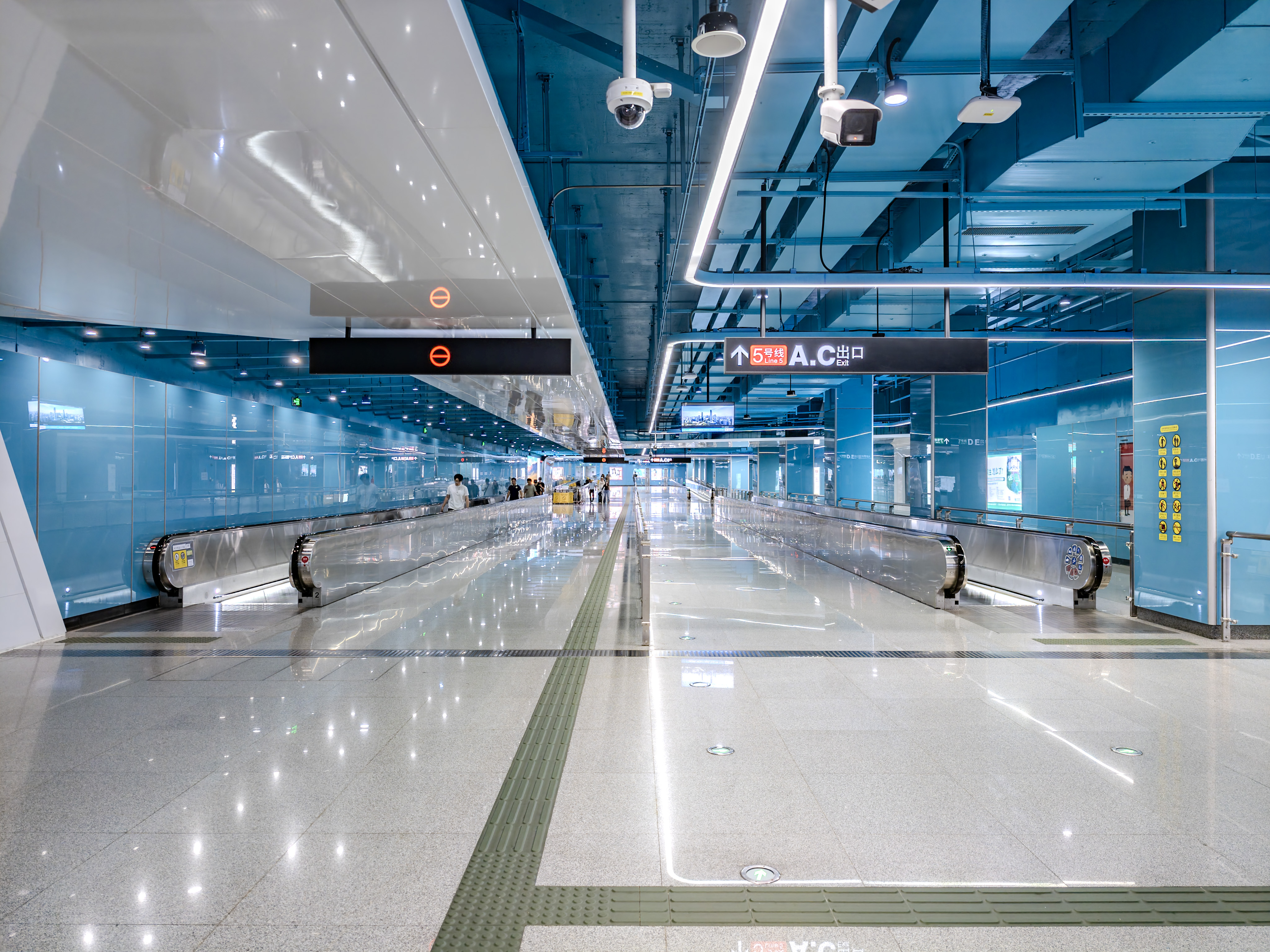
Transfer passageway

=== Platforms ===
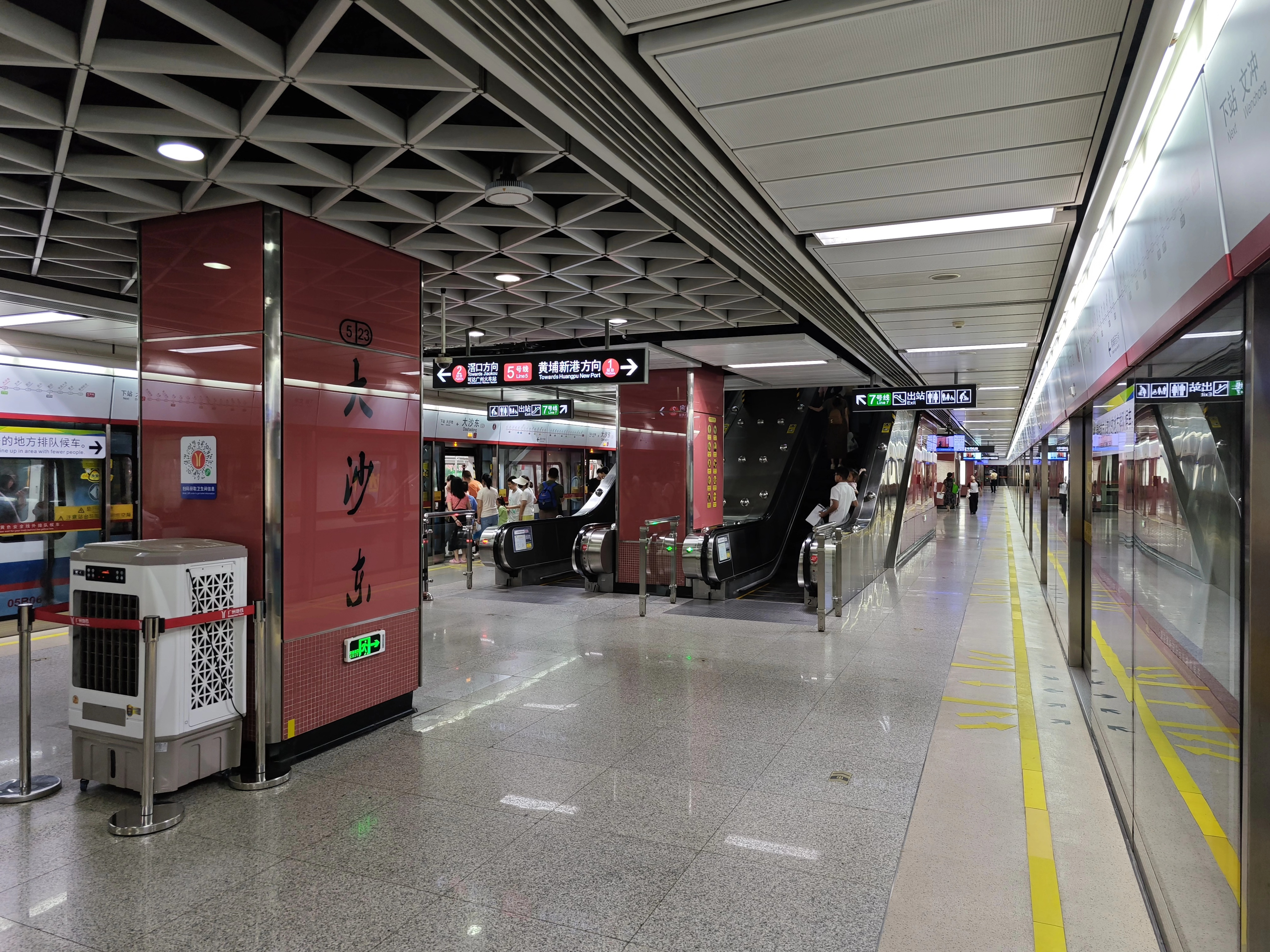
Line 5 platform

Both the Line 5 and Line 7 stations have underground island platforms, with Line 5 on the upper level and Line 7 on the lower level. The Line 5 platforms are under the intersection of Dasha East Road and Guangxin Road, and the Line 7 platforms are under Zhendong Road.

=== Entrances/exits ===
The station has 5 points of entry/exit, of which Exits A and C are located at the Line 5 concourse, Exits D and E are located at the Line 7 concourse and Exit F is located at the transfer passage between the two lines. Exit A is equipped with a stairlift, and Exit E is equipped with an elevator.

In addition to Exits A and C when the Line 5 station opened, Exit D was also set up on the north side of Dasha East Road, but in order to cooperate with the construction of the transfer channel of Line 7, Exit D was closed and demolished on 9 April 2021. Exit D is now used by the Line 7 station on the sidewalk on the east side of Zhendong Road.

==== Line 5 concourse ====
- A: Dashadi East Road, Guangzhou Huangpu District People's Court (West Campus)
- C: Dashadi East Road, Huangpu Customs of the People's Republic of China, Guangzhou Huangpu District People's Court (East Campus)

==== Transfer passage ====
- F: Dashadi East Road, Huangpu Customs of the People's Republic of China, Guangzhou Huangpu District People's Court (East Campus)

==== Line 7 concourse ====
- D: Zhendong Road
- E: Dashadi East Road, Guangzhou Huangpu District People's Court (West Campus)
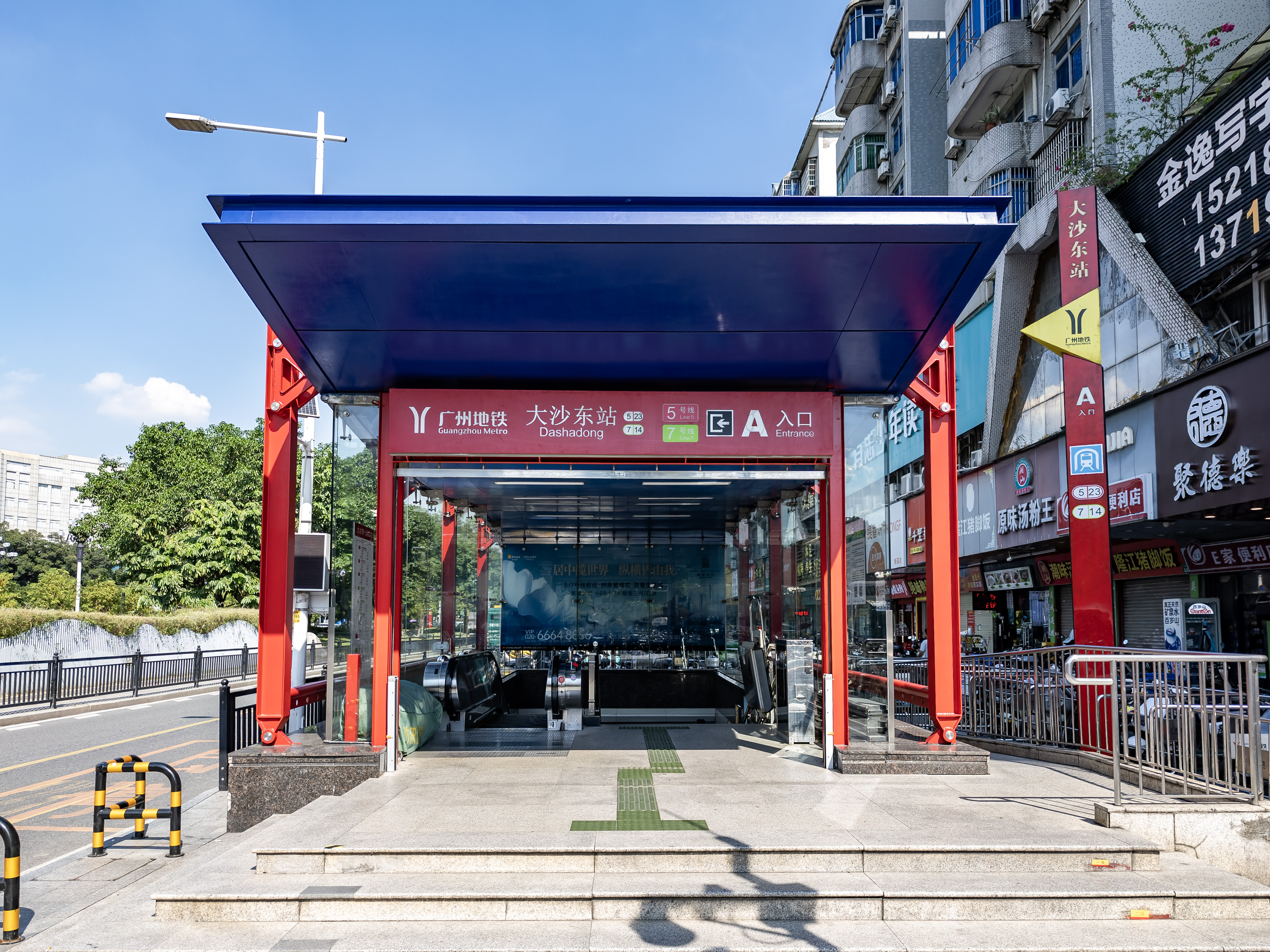
Entrance A

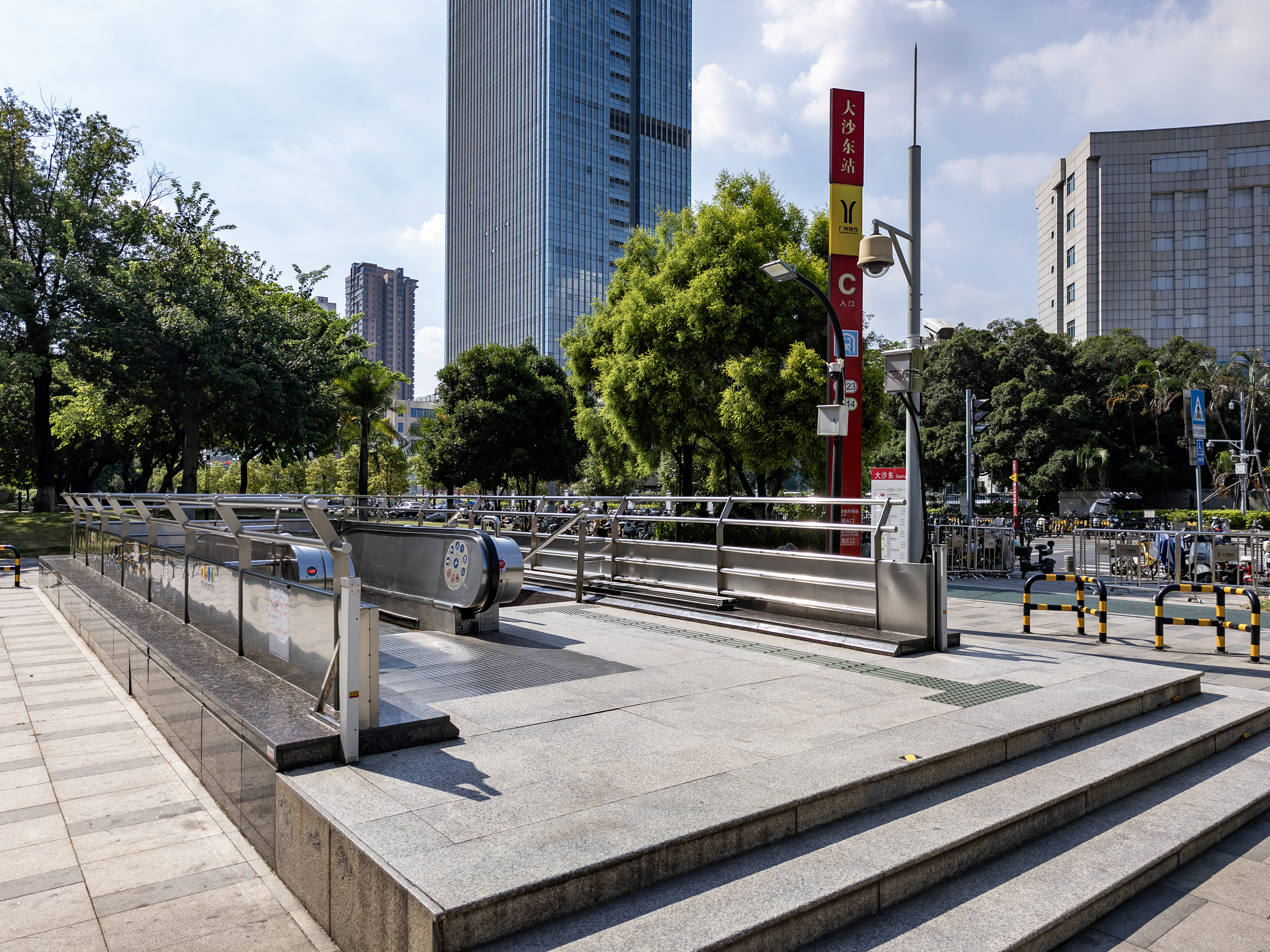
Entrance C

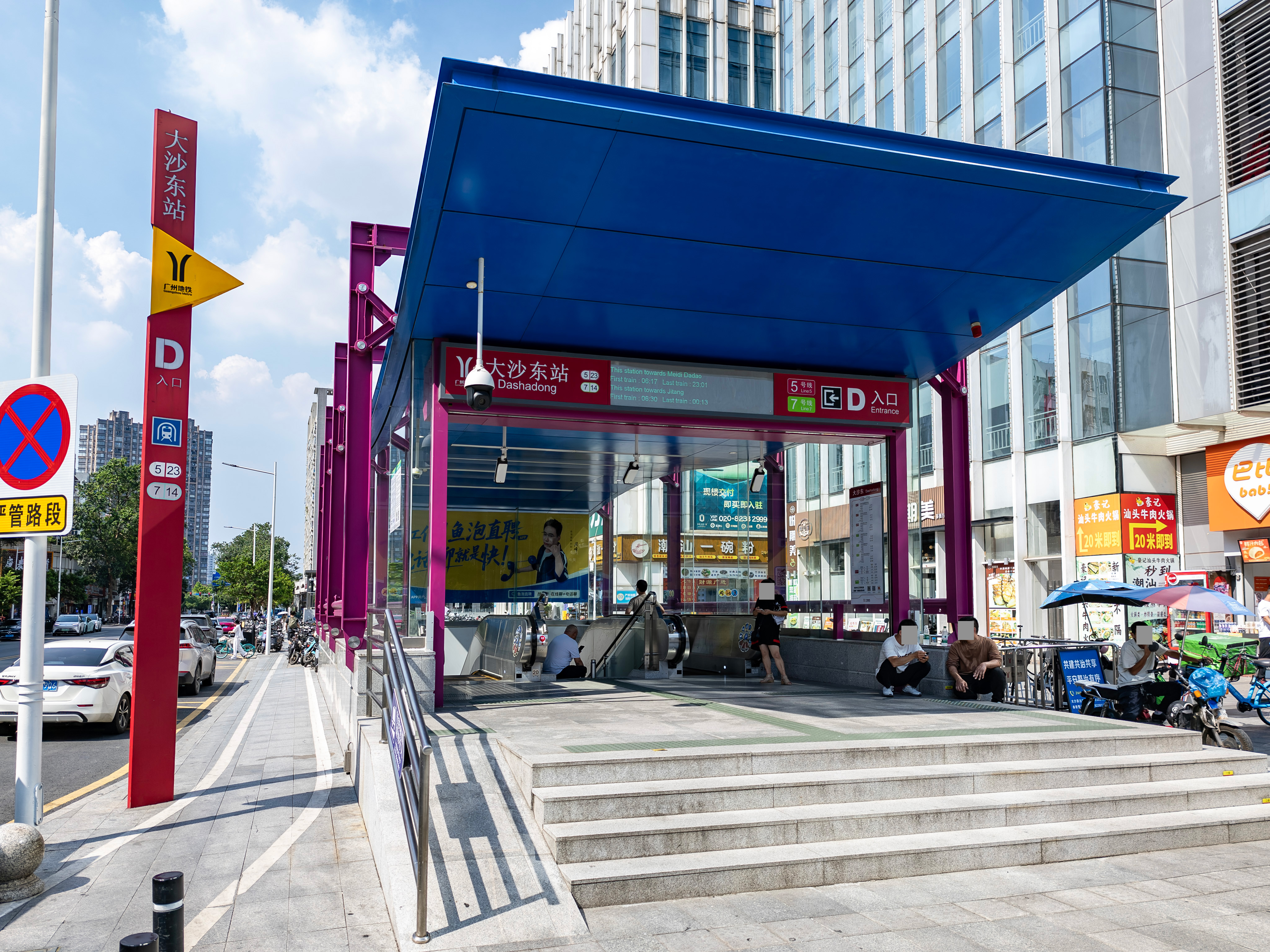
Entrance D

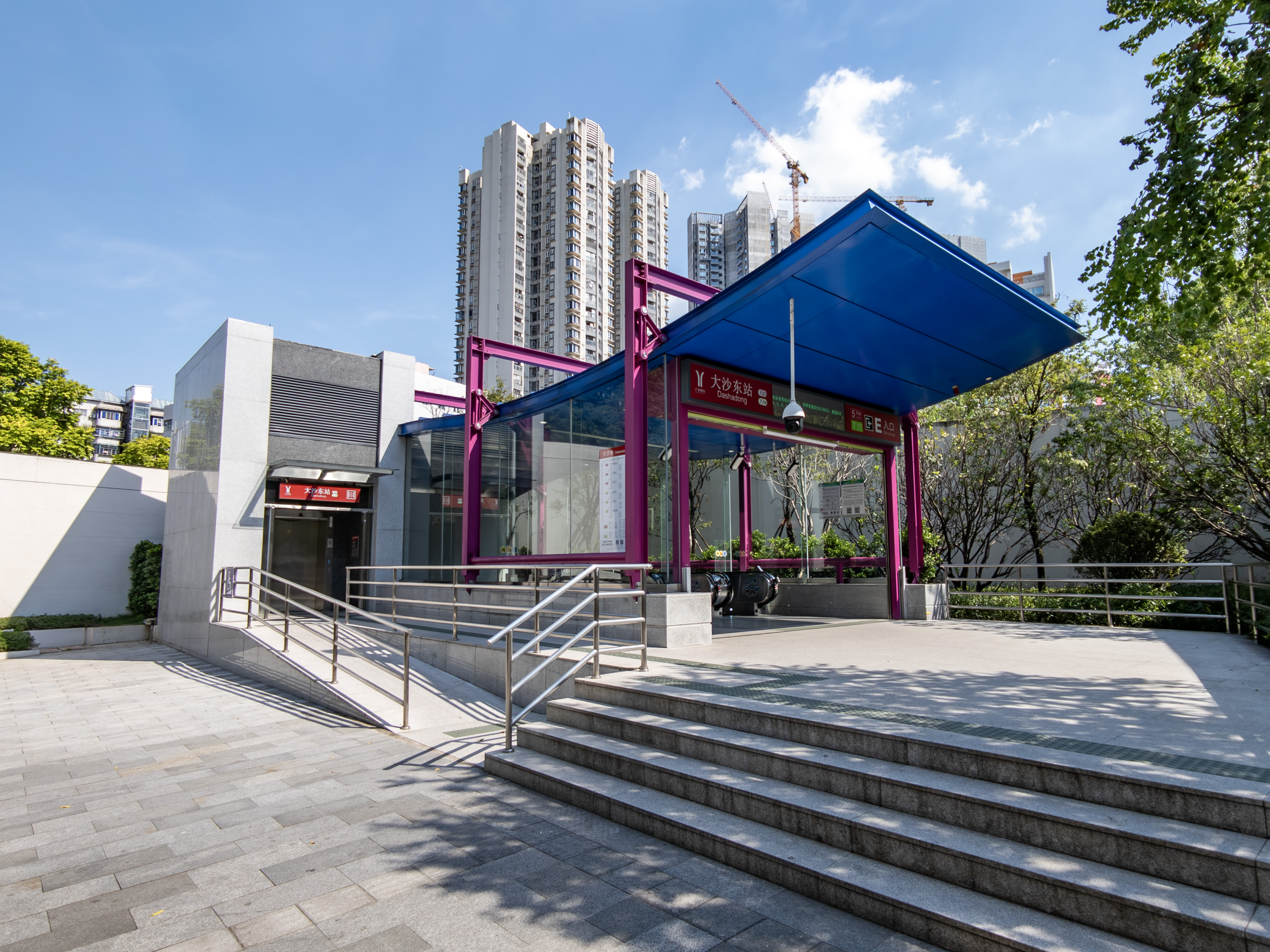
Entrance E

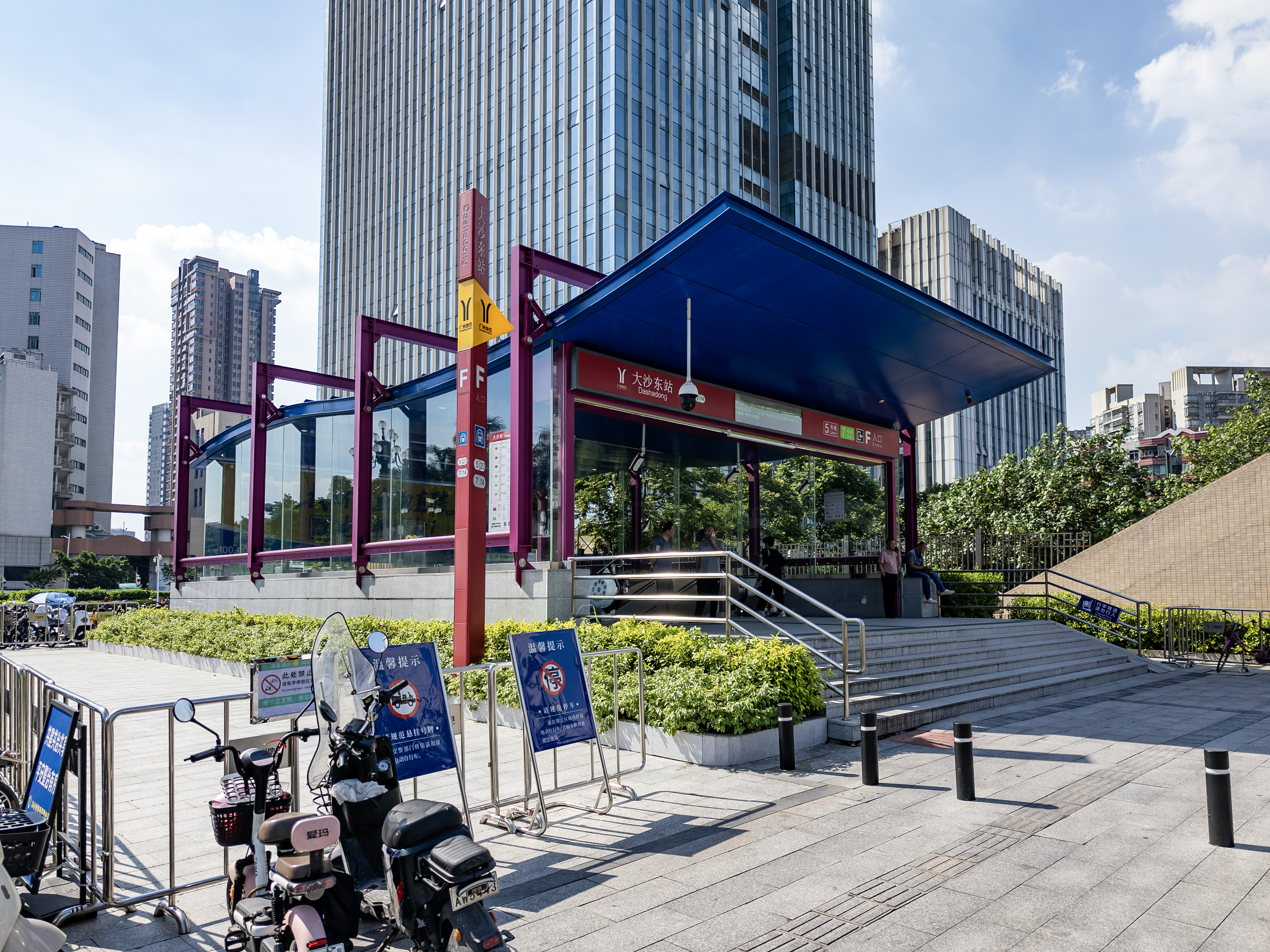
Entrance F

== Usage ==
The station is close to the former Huangpu District Government and some residential communities, so the station has a certain passenger flow during the morning and evening peak hours.

In response to the opening of the rear section of Line 21 exacerbating the passenger flow pressure of the morning peak of Line 5, the station has implemented passenger flow control measures during the morning rush hour on weekdays since 18 December 2019, before cancelling the measures afterward.

== History ==
The station first appeared in the 2003 plan. When planning Line 5, it was changed to turn northeast to connect to Dashadi Road at the south of the Maogang Interchange, and then extend along Dashadi Road from east to west, with this station, called Dashadi station, also set up in between. The station was once used as the terminus of the Huangpu end of Line 7 and intersected with Line 5 until 2015, when the original Huangpu District and Luogang District were merged into the new Huangpu District. The line plan then continued north from this station into the Luogang area, and the station was also changed to an intermediate station, before finally becoming part of the second phase of Line 7 and construction was implemented.

The Line 5 station officially started construction in 2007, On 28 June 2009, the station completed the "three rights" transfer. On 28 December the same year, the station officially opened with the opening of Line 5.

The Line 7 station site was enclosed between the intersection of Sanduo Road and Zhendong Road to the intersection of Dasha East Road and Zhendong Road on 28 December 2018 for station construction. Exit D was also closed on 9 April 2021 to allow for the construction of transfer passages. The Line 7 station's main structure was topped out in early August 2022, and the "three rights" transfer of the station was completed on 31 October 2023. At 12:00 on 28 December 2023, the Line 7 station officially opened with the opening of the second phase of Line 7, and the station became a transfer station.

=== Incident ===
During COVID-19 pandemic control rules in 2022, Exit A of the station was temporarily closed from 7 November to the afternoon of 30 November due to the impact of prevention and control measures.
