= Line 5 (Guangzhou Metro) =

Line of the Guangzhou Metro

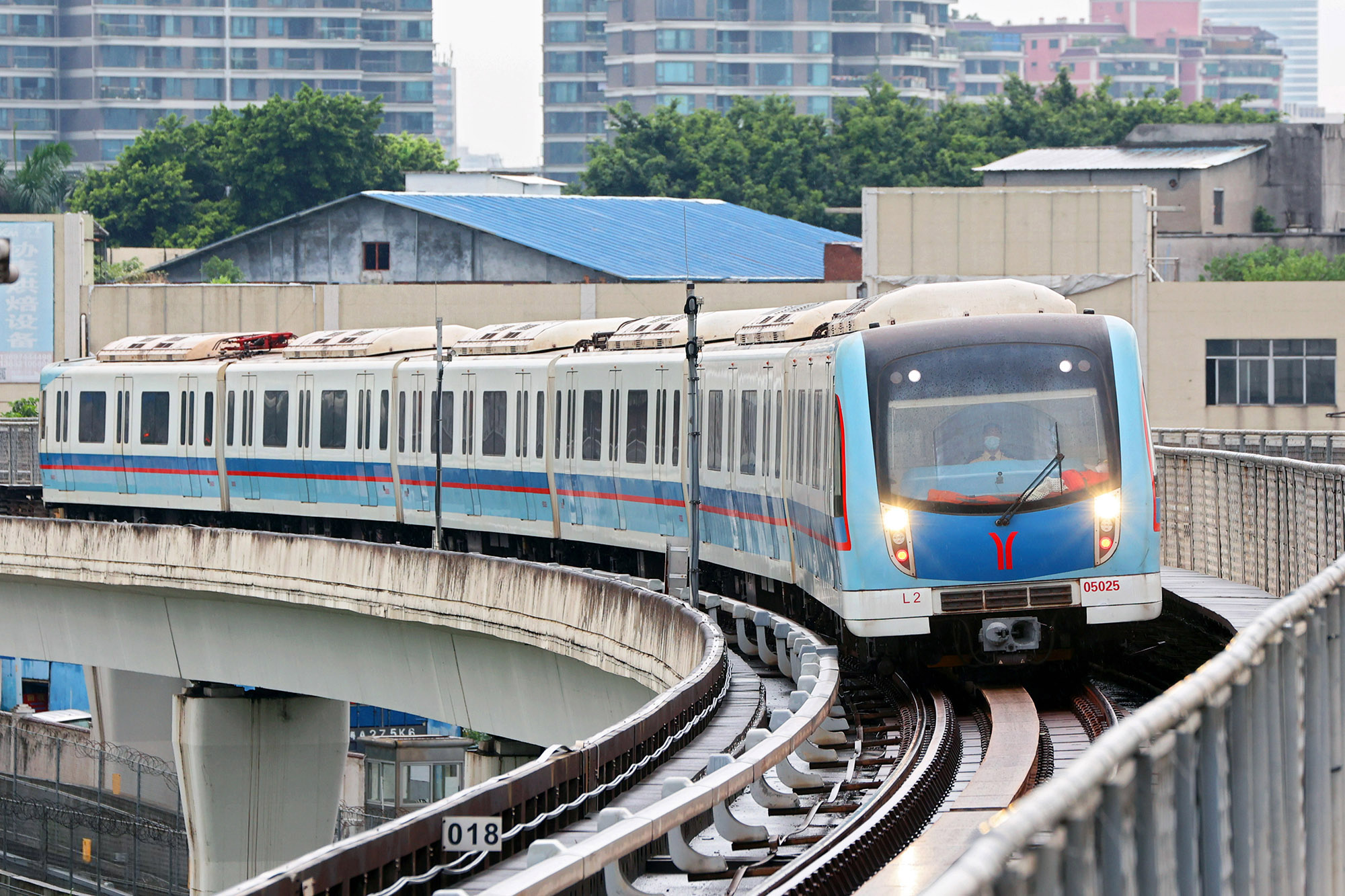
- A Line 5 train

Overview
- Other name(s): L2 (5 lines plan name); M3 (7 lines plan name); M5 (2000 plan name); Huanshilu line (环市路线)
- Status: Operational
- Owner: City of Guangzhou
- Locale: Huangpu, Tianhe, Yuexiu, and Liwan districts Guangzhou, Guangdong
- Termini: Jiaokou; Huangpu New Port
- Stations: 30

Service
- Type: Rapid transit
- System: Guangzhou Metro
- Services: 1
- Operator: Guangzhou Metro Corporation
- Rolling stock: CRRC Qingdao Sifang/Kawasaki Heavy Industries Metro cars
- Daily ridership: 966,900 (2025 daily average)

History
- Opened: 28 December 2009; 16 years ago

Technical
- Line length: 41.7 km (25.91 mi)
- Number of tracks: 2
- Character: Underground and Elevated
- Track gauge: 1,435 mm (4 ft 8 1/2 in)
- Electrification: Third rail, 1,500 V DC (Overhead lines with same voltage installed in depot)
- Operating speed: 90 km/h (56 mph)

Line 5
- Simplified Chinese: 广州地铁5号线
- Traditional Chinese: 廣州地鐵5號線
Transcriptions
Standard Mandarin
- Hanyu Pinyin: Guǎngzhōu Dìtiě Wǔ Hào Xiàn
Yue: Cantonese
- Jyutping: gwong^{2}zau^{1} dei^{6}tit^{3} ng^{5} hou^{6} sin^{3}

Line 5 is a line on Guangzhou Metro that runs 41.7 km (25.91 mi) in a wide "∩" shape across Guangzhou, from Jiaokou in Liwan District to Huangpu New Port in Huangpu District. Line 5's color is red. It began operation on 28 December 2009, from Jiaokou to Wenchong, and was extended east from Wenchong to Huangpu New Port on 28 December 2023.

== History ==
=== Construction ===
Line 5 received approval from the National Development and Reform Commission in 2005. It was intended to connect the old city centre, the growing Tianhe CBD and new development in both the east and west of the city. It would run 31.9 km (19.82 mi) from Jiakou in the west to Wenyuan (renamed Wenchong before opening) in the east, via Guangzhou Railway Station and Zhujiang New Town. Of this, 29.9 km (18.58 mi) would be underground, with the remainer on viaduct. There would be 24 stations (22 underground, 2 elevated).

Major works started on the line's construction on 26 June 2006, with the simulatanous launch of 3 tunnel boring machines. The line was expected to be completed by the end of 2008, however it was noted there were challenging geological conditions expected in several sections. Indeed, in January 2008, a sinkhole opened near the site of Zhongshanba station during construction of a cross-passage.

By 20 September 2009, train testing was well underway, with trains being tested at speeds of up to 98km/h along the entire line, with opening expected by the end of the year. The line was opened on 28 December 2009, with an opening ceremony at Zhujiang New Town station.

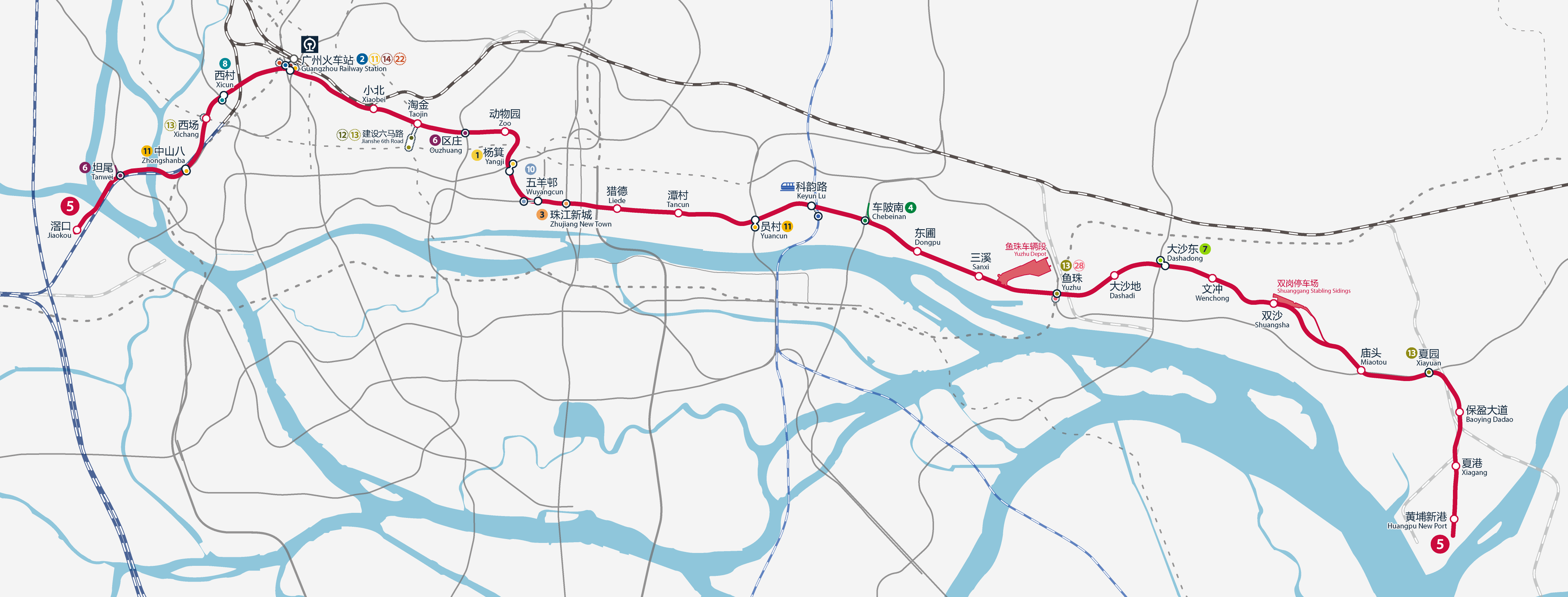
Line 5 drawn to scale.

=== Extension ===
As part of the Guangzhou Urban Rail Transit Near-term Plan (2016-2022), an eastern extension of Line 5 from Wenchong to Huangpu Passenger Port (renamed New Port before opening) was proposed. The project passed expert review in November 2016 and was approved by the National Development and Reform Commission in January 2018.

Work started on the extension on 19 November 2018. The rail corridor and new stabling yard at Shuanggang were handed over from the construction contractors to Guangzhou Metro for final testing in August 2023. Likewise the stations were handed over in November the same year.

The extension was opened on 28 December 2023, together with Phase 2 of Line 7.

=== Summary ===
Segment	Commencement	Length	Station(s)	Name
Jiaokou — Wenchong	28 December 2009	31.9 km (19.82 mi)	24	(initial phase)
Wenchong — Huangpu New Port	28 December 2023	9.8 km (6.09 mi)	6	Eastern extension

== Stations ==
Station No.	Station name		Connections	Future Connections	Distance km		Location
Station No.	English	Chinese	Connections	Future Connections	Distance km		Location
501	Jiaokou	滘口			0.00	0.00	Liwan
502	Tanwei	坦尾	6 605		1.75	1.75	Liwan
503	Zhongshanba	中山八	11 1117		1.54	3.29	Liwan
504	Xichang	西场		13 1308	1.53	4.82	Liwan
505	Xicun	西村	8 810		0.68	5.50	Liwan
506	Guangzhou Railway Station	广州火车站	2 216; GS GZQ	11 1114 14 1401 22	1.58	7.08	Yuexiu
507	Xiaobei	小北			2.40	9.48	Yuexiu
508	Taojin	淘金		Jianshe 6th Road: 12 1214 13 1312	1.10	10.58	Yuexiu
509	Ouzhuang	区庄	6 615		1.03	11.61	Yuexiu
510	Zoo	动物园			1.09	12.70	Yuexiu
511	Yangji	杨箕	1 113		1.05	13.75	Yuexiu
512	Wuyangcun	五羊邨	10 1011 (OSI)		1.06	14.81	Yuexiu
513	Zhujiang New Town	珠江新城	3 310		0.76	15.57	Tianhe
514	Liede	猎德			1.15	16.72	Tianhe
515	Tancun	潭村			1.44	18.16	Tianhe
516	Yuancun	员村	11 1103		1.79	19.95	Tianhe
517	Keyun Lu	科韵路	ER		1.55	21.50	Tianhe
518	Chebeinan	车陂南	4 422		1.37	22.87	Tianhe
519	Dongpu	东圃			1.37	24.24	Tianhe
520	Sanxi	三溪			1.55	25.79	Tianhe
521	Yuzhu	鱼珠	13 1324	28	1.79	27.58	Huangpu
522	Dashadi	大沙地			1.55	29.13	Huangpu
523	Dashadong	大沙东	7 714		1.33	30.46	Huangpu
524	Wenchong	文冲			1.19	31.65	Huangpu
525	Shuangsha	双沙					Huangpu
526	Miaotou	庙头	GBRT				Huangpu
527	Xiayuan	夏园	13 1328; GBRT				Huangpu
528	Baoying Dadao	保盈大道					Huangpu
529	Xiagang	夏港					Huangpu
530	Huangpu New Port	黄埔新港					Huangpu

== Rolling stock ==
Like line 4, Line 5 was designed to use smaller type L trains with linear induction motor technology. It was originally planned to have a fleet of 45 four-car trains initially, with trains gradually built up to six cars as patronage grew, up to 67 trains in the long-term. However, it was later decided to open with six-car trains and thus the order was changed to thirty six-car trains. The initial trains were designated class L2 and manufactured by Kawasaki Heavy Industries, in collaboration with Itochu and CSR Sifang.

With patronage growing, more trains (designated class L4) were ordered in 2010. The first twenty (subclass L4-I) were produced by CSR Sifang in collaboration with Itochu and were very similar to the L2 trains, with the only major change being the use of fully domestically designed bogies. The remaining 12 (subclass L4-II) had even more domestic content, with the full traction package being locally made.

In 2020, Guangzhou Metro released a tender for 14 additional trains to supplement the fleet in preparation for the east extension. These trains entered service with the eastern extension of the line and feature LCD passenger information displays.

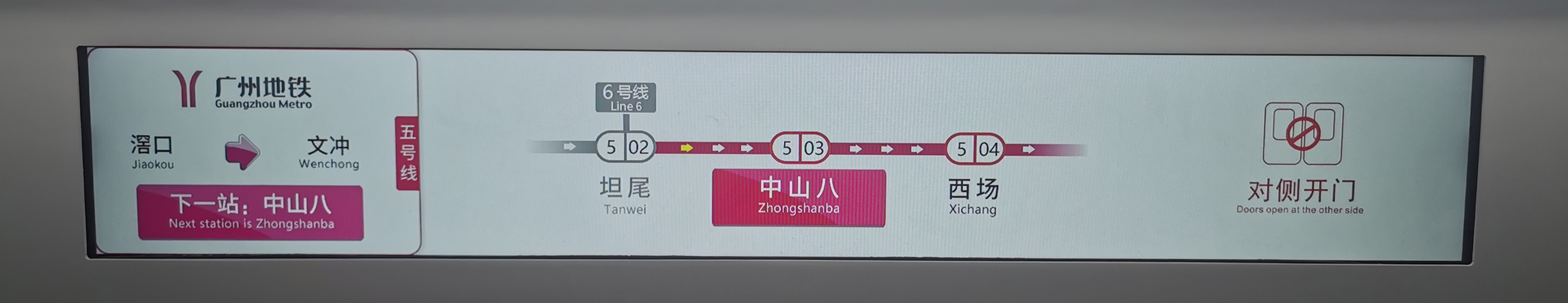
LCD passenger information display on a L7 series train.

Type	Time of manufacturing	Class	Sets	Assembly	Notes
Type L	2008–2010	L2	30	Mcp+M+Mp+M+M+Mcp	Manufactured by CRRC Qingdao Sifang and Itochu
Type L	2011–2013	L4-I & L4-II	32	Mcp+M+Mp+M+M+Mcp	Manufactured by CRRC Qingdao Sifang and Itochu
Type L	2021–2022	L7	14	Mcp+M+Mp+M+M+Mcp	Manufactured by CRRC Guangdong.

== Operations ==
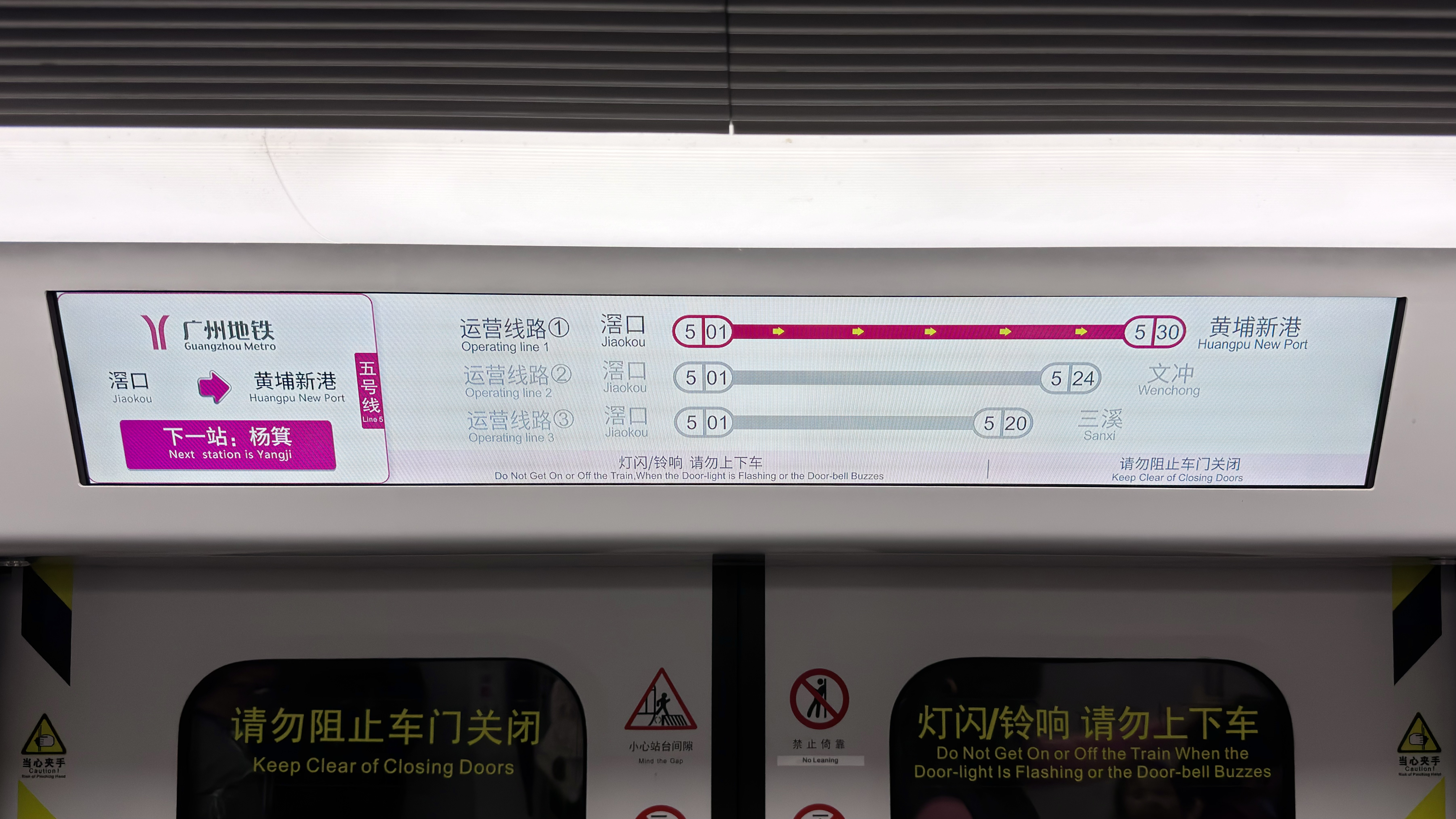
The three service patterns of Line 5, as shown on a L7 series train

=== Timetable ===
The full trip from Jiaokou to Huangpu Passenger Port is scheduled to take 70 minutes each way. Services run as frequently as every 2 minutes during peak hours, the highest frequency of any line on the Guangzhou Metro network. Short workings from Jiaokou to Wenchong operate throughout the day. In addition, during the morning peak, short workings run between Jiaokou and Sanxi.

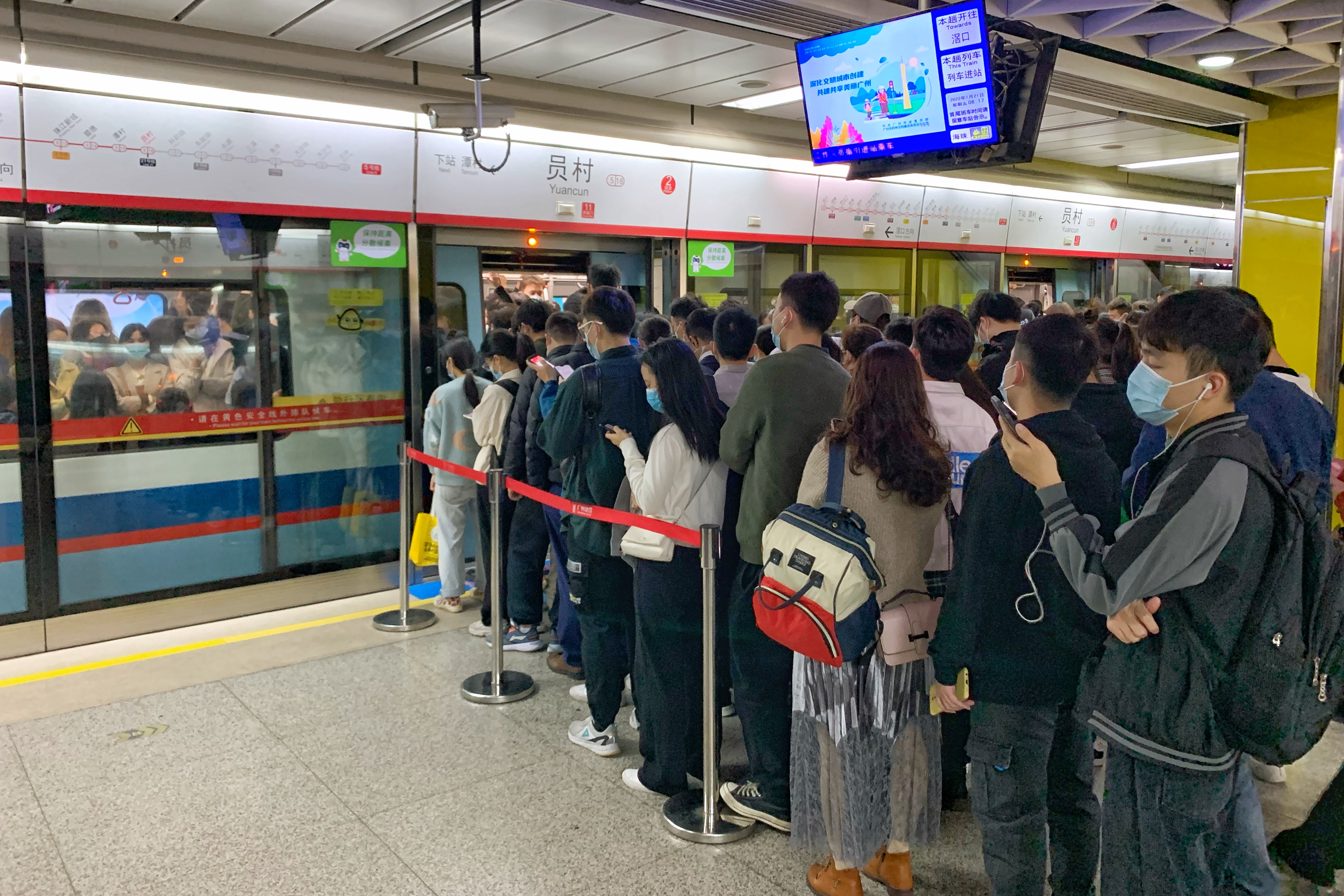
Rush-hour congestion in January 2022 at Yuancun station.

=== Ridership ===
On 31 December 2009, Line 5 set a record of 567,000 daily passengers, surpassing the ten year ridership projections in the span of just 4 days after its opening. By May 2017, Line 5 carried an average of 1.05 million passengers per day and was extremely congested throughout the day, operating at over 100% capacity during rush hours. The opening of Phase I of Line 13 further increased traffic demand on the west end of Line 5 and pushing congestion to over 130% capacity, prompting the Guangzhou Metro to limit passenger traffic at a number of stations on Line 5. In 2018, the busiest section of Line 5 reaches over 50,000 pphpd of traffic volume during peak periods. By 2019, the line was used by 1.18 million passengers each day.

== Future ==
The current eastern terminus at Huangpu New Port is only one river crossing away from the neighbouring city of Dongguan and space has been reserved for a further extension into Dongguan.
