= Huangpu New Port station =

Guangzhou Metro Line 5 station

Huangpu New Port 黄埔新港
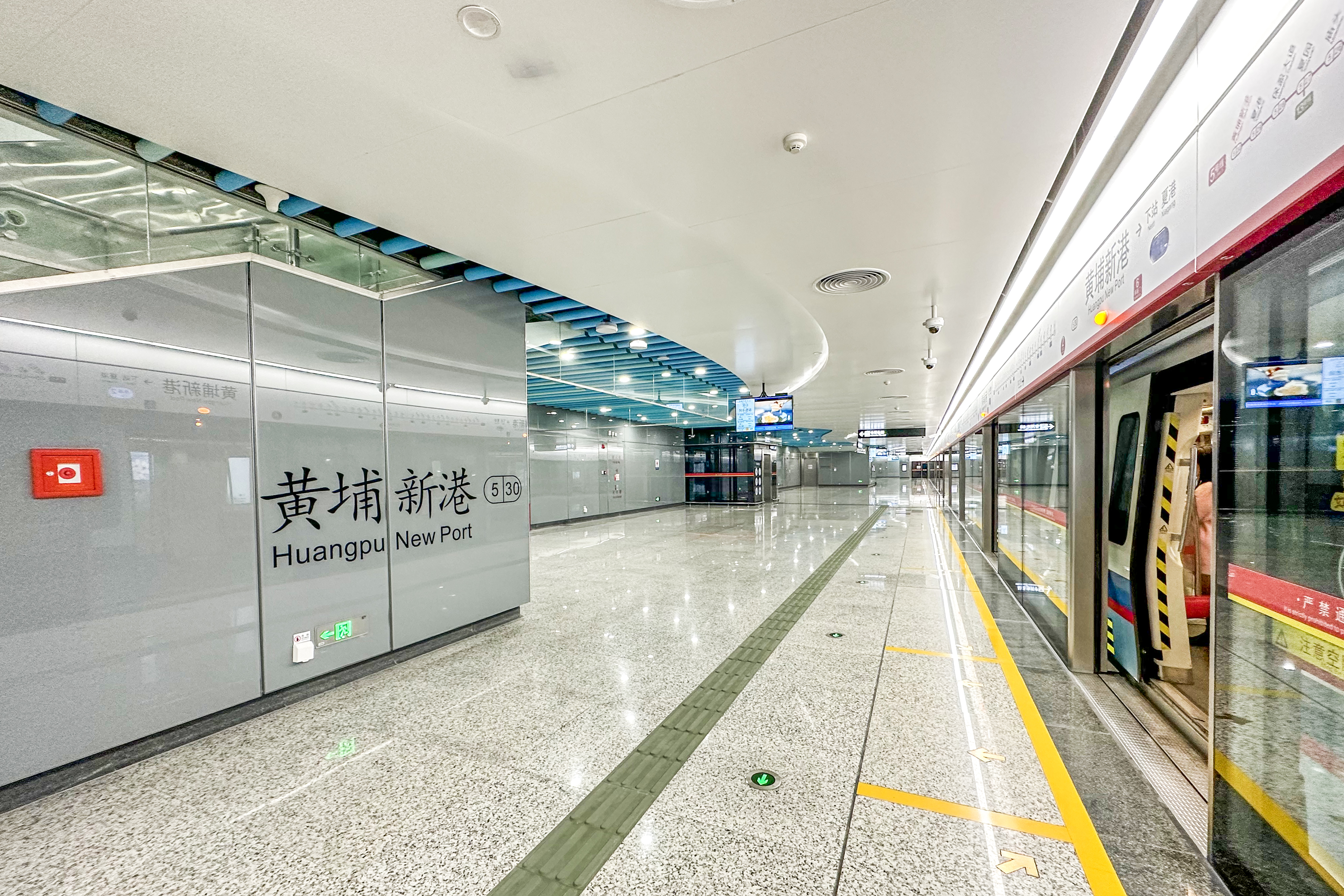
- Platform 2 (originating platform)

Chinese name
- Chinese: 黄埔新港站
Transcriptions
Standard Mandarin
- Hanyu Pinyin: Huángpǔ Xīngǎng Zhàn
Yue: Cantonese
- Yale Romanization: Wòhngbou Sāngóng Jaahm
- Jyutping: Wong^{4}bou^{3} San^{1}gong^{2} Zaam^{6}

General information
- Location: Intersection of Kaifa Avenue (开发大道) and Baoshi Road (宝石路), Huangpu District, Guangzhou, Guangdong; China
- Coordinates: 23°3′18.36″N 113°31′10.24″E
- Operator: Guangzhou Metro Co. Ltd.
- Line: Line 5
- Platforms: 2 (2 side platforms)
- Tracks: 2

Construction
- Structure type: Underground
- Accessible: Yes

Other information
- Station code: 530

History
- Opened: 28 December 2023 (2 years ago)
- Former names: Huangpu Passenger Port (黄埔客运港)

Services
Preceding station	Guangzhou Metro	Following station
Xiagang towards Jiaokou	Line 5	Terminus
Location

Huangpu New Port station (Chinese: 黄埔新港站; pinyin: Huángpǔ Xīngǎng Zhàn; Cantonese Yale: Wòhngbou Sāngóng Jaahm) is a metro station on Line 5 of the Guangzhou Metro in Guangzhou, China. It is located underground at the intersection of Kaifa Avenue (开发大道) and Baoshi Road (宝石路) in Huangpu District. It opened on 28 December 2023, with the opening of the eastern extension of Line 5, and is the eastern terminus of the line.

== Featured theme ==
The station is a cultured themed station on the eastern extension of Line 5, with the design theme of "Sails Like Clouds", and the ceiling part of the station adopts a blue gradient as the background color, with a white ceiling and simple lights to represent the blue sky and white clouds. In addition, the color scheme of the glass panels of this station is gray, which is different from the white panels of each station in the eastern extension of Line 5.

== Station layout ==
The station has 3 underground floors. The ground level are the entrances/exits toward Kaifa Avenue, Baoshi Road, Dongjiang Avenue, Huangpu New Port Freight Terminal and adjacent buildings. The first floor is the concourse, the second floor are the Line 5 platforms, and the third floor is part of the structure of the reserved new line platform. Both Line 5 platforms feature toilets and nursery rooms, both of which are located at one end of the platform. In addition, there is also a toilet near the Exit C passage in the concourse non-paid area.

G	Street level	Exits A-C
L1; Concourse	Lobby	Ticket Machines, Customer Service, Shops, Police Station, Safety Facilities, Toilets
L2; Platforms	Side platform, doors will open on the right (Toilets, Nursery)
L2; Platforms	Platform 2	5 towards Jiaokou (Xiagang)
L2; Platforms	Platform 1	5 termination platform
L2; Platforms	Side platform, doors will open on the right (Toilets, Nursery)
L3; Reserved Platforms		reserved track area
L3; Reserved Platforms	Reserved Island platform
L3; Reserved Platforms		reserved track area

=== Platform ===
The station has 2 side platforms located under Kaifa Avenue. In addition, there is a set of crossing lines at the south end of the platform for Line 5 trains to turnback after the station during normal operation, and at the north end of the platform, there is a turnaround line connecting the up and down main lines for Line 5 trains to turnback before the station under special circumstances.

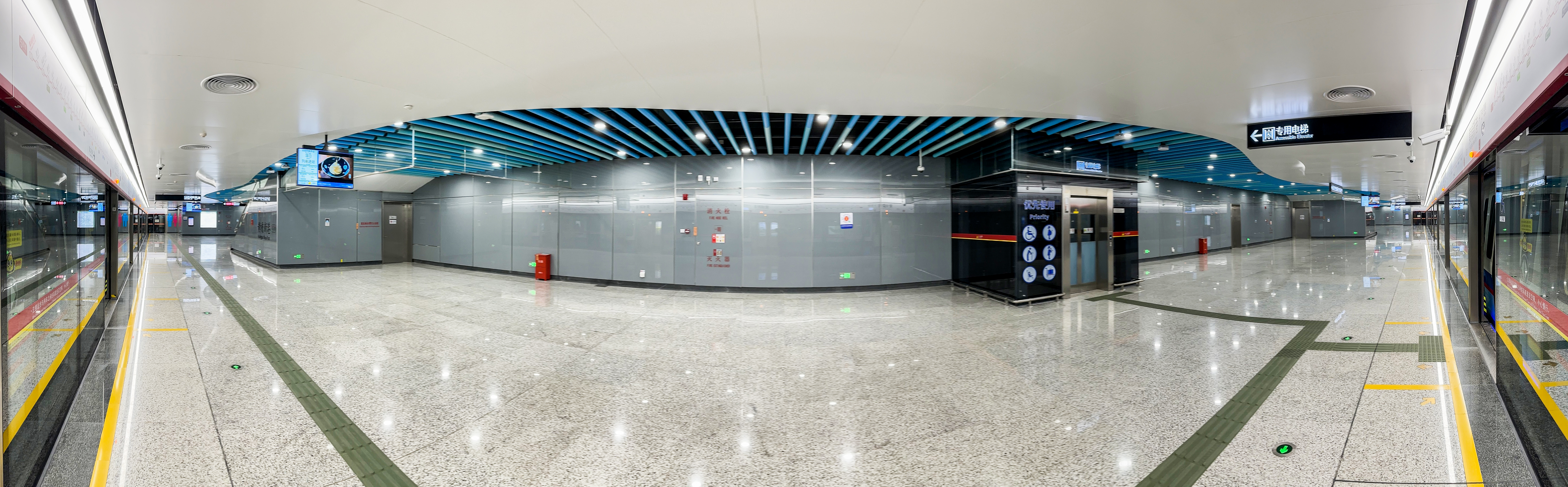
Platform 2 panorama (originating platform)

=== Entrances/exits ===
The station has 3 points of entry/exit. Exit A is equipped with an elevator.

- A: Kaifa Avenue
- B: Kaifa Avenue
- C: Kaifa Avenue
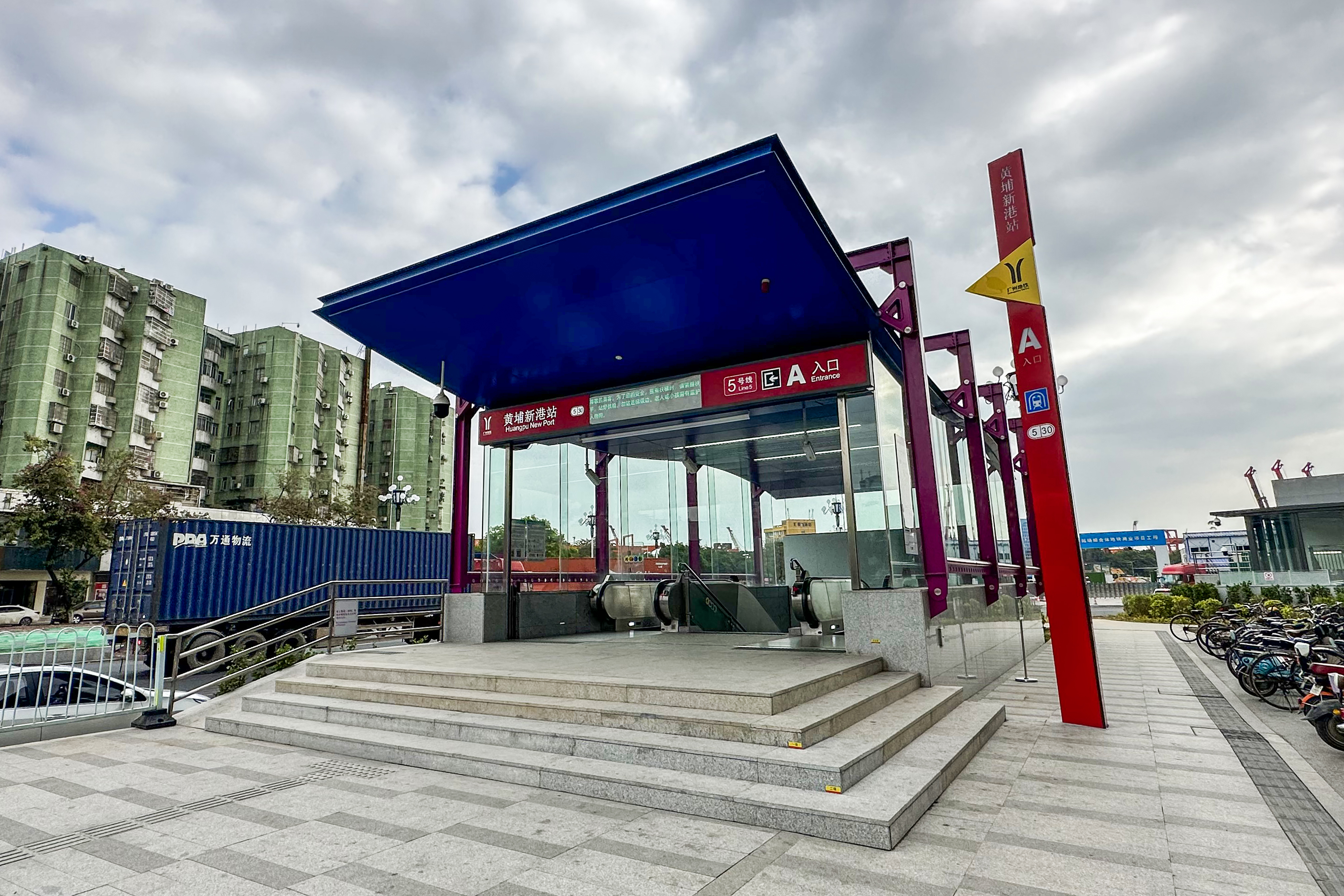
Entrance A

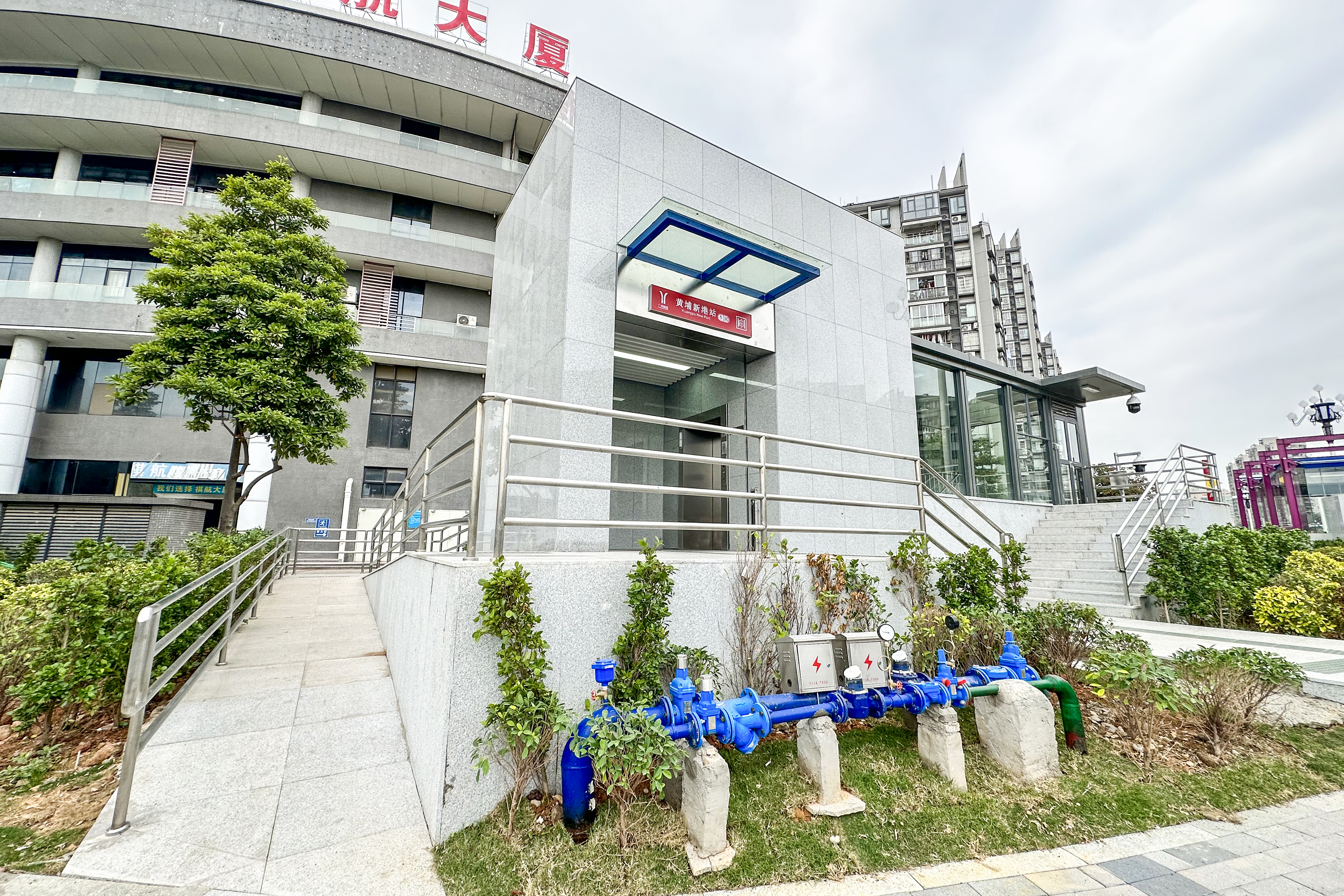
Entrance A (Elevator entrance)

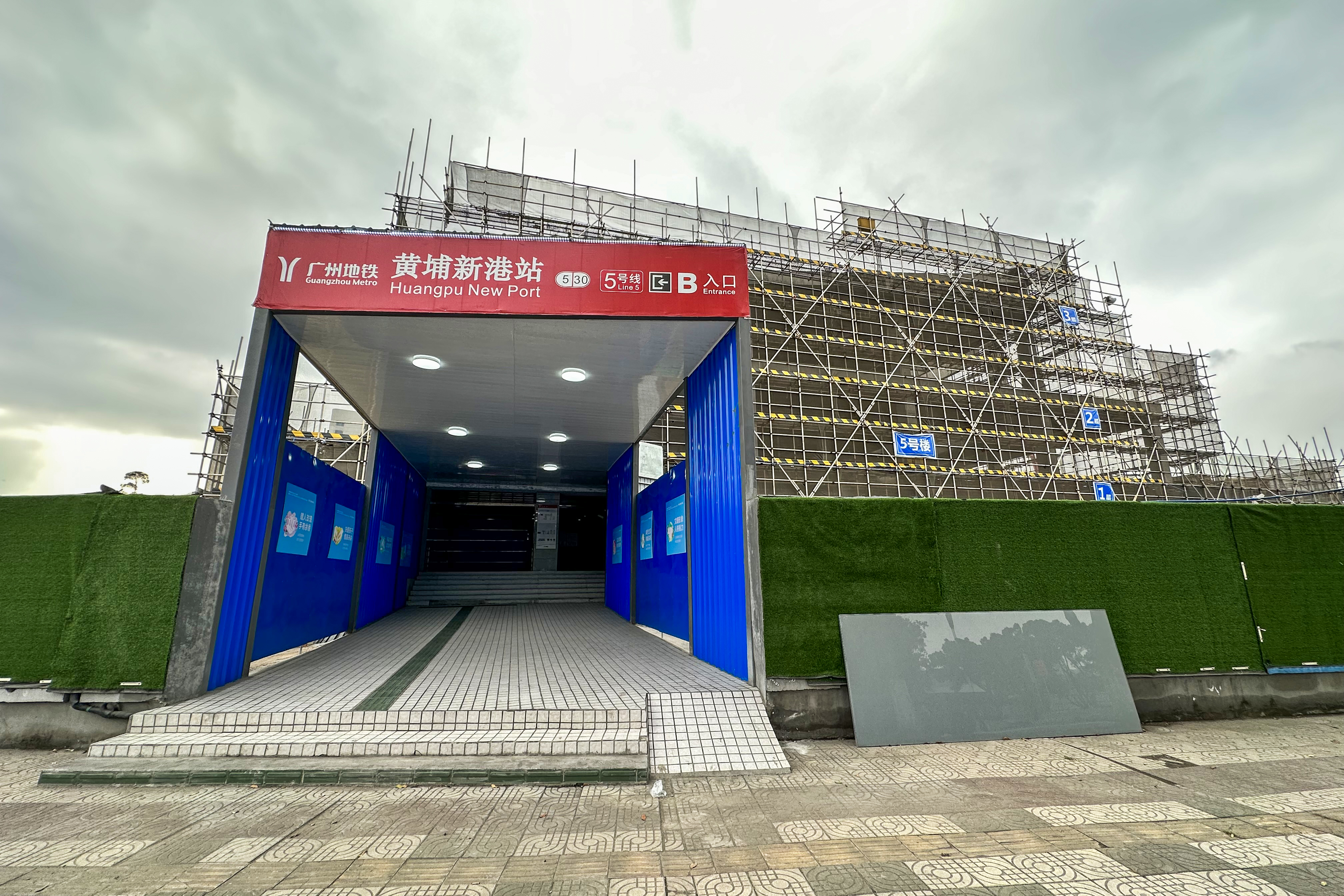
Temporary entrance B

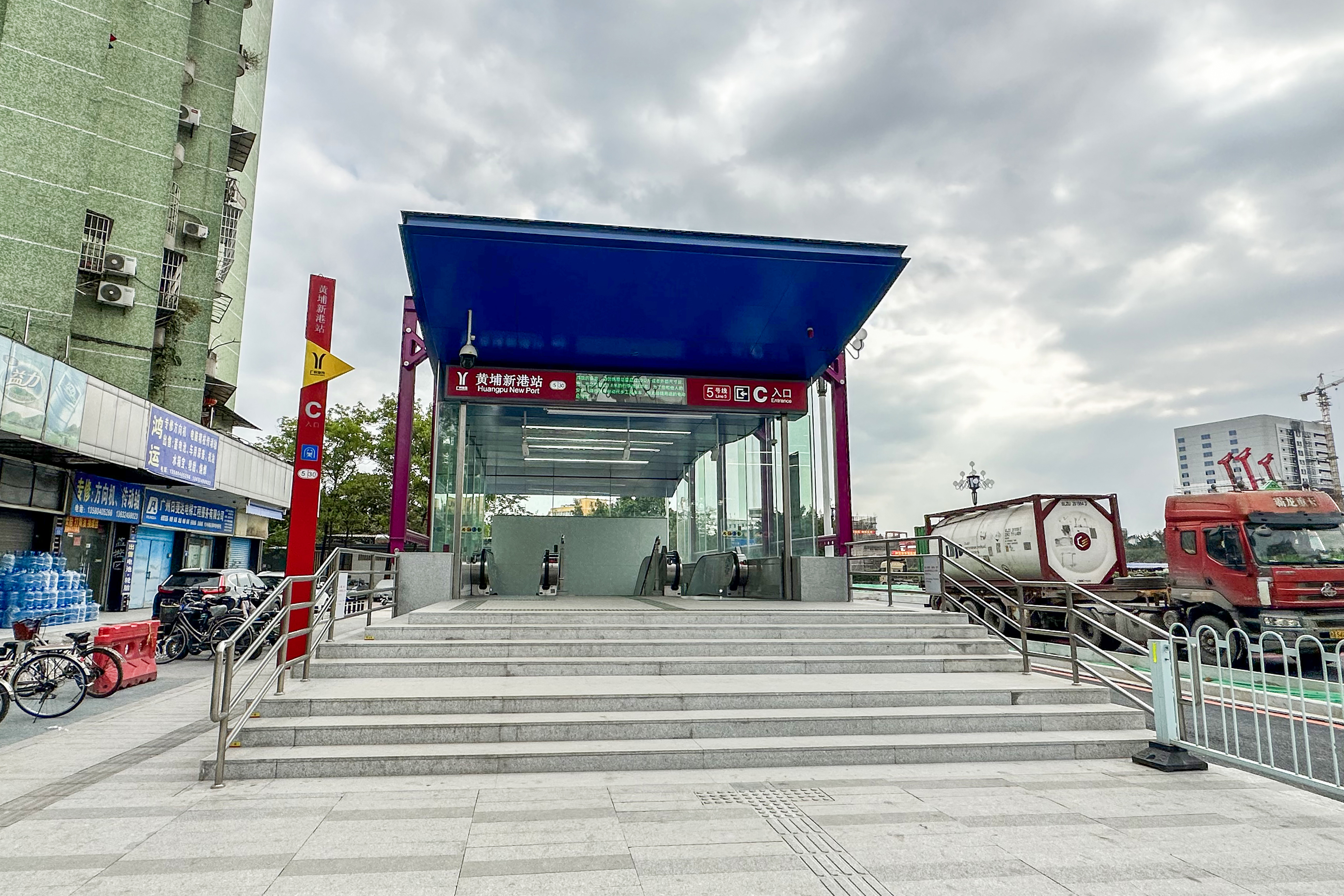
Entrance C

== Gallery ==
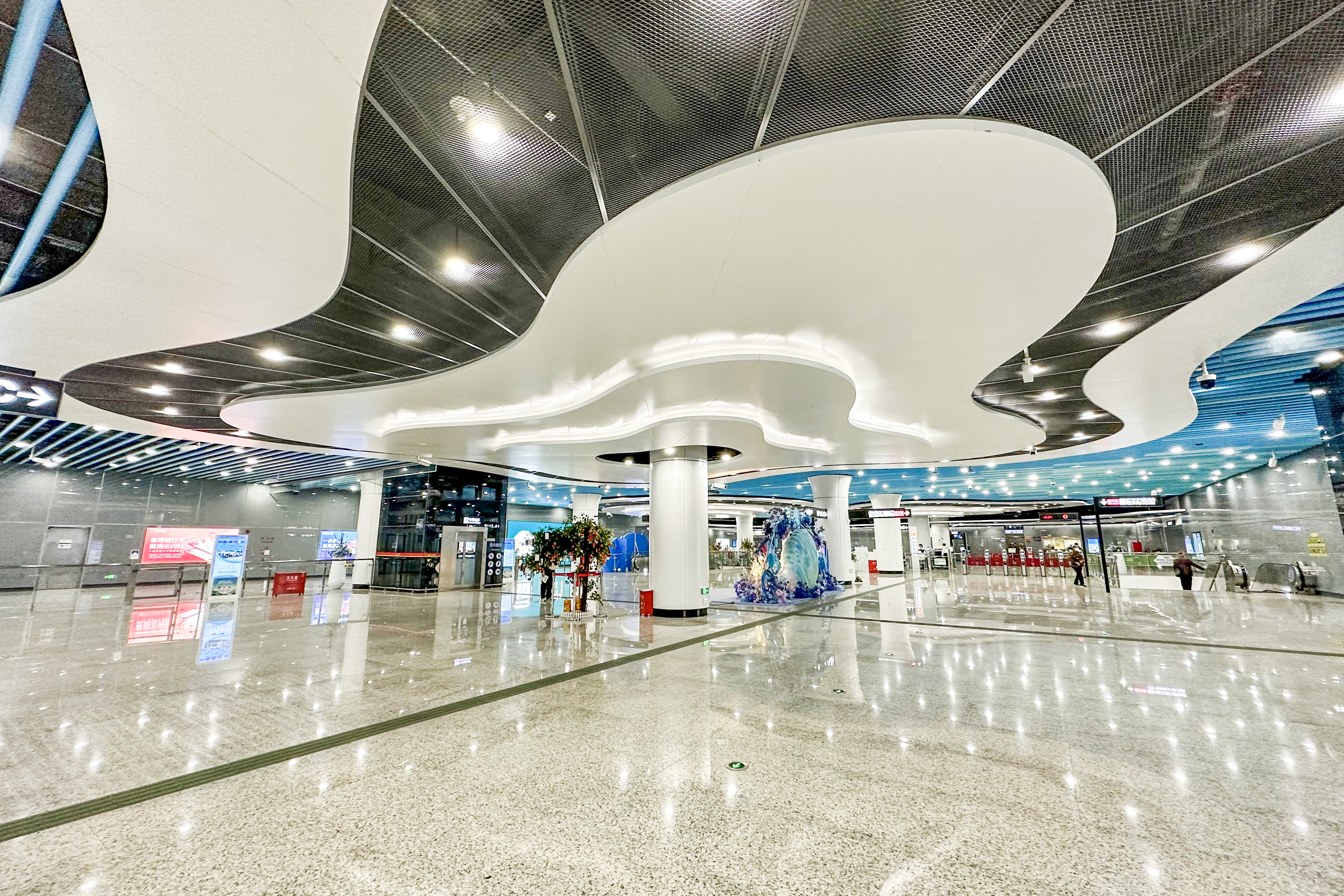
Concourse

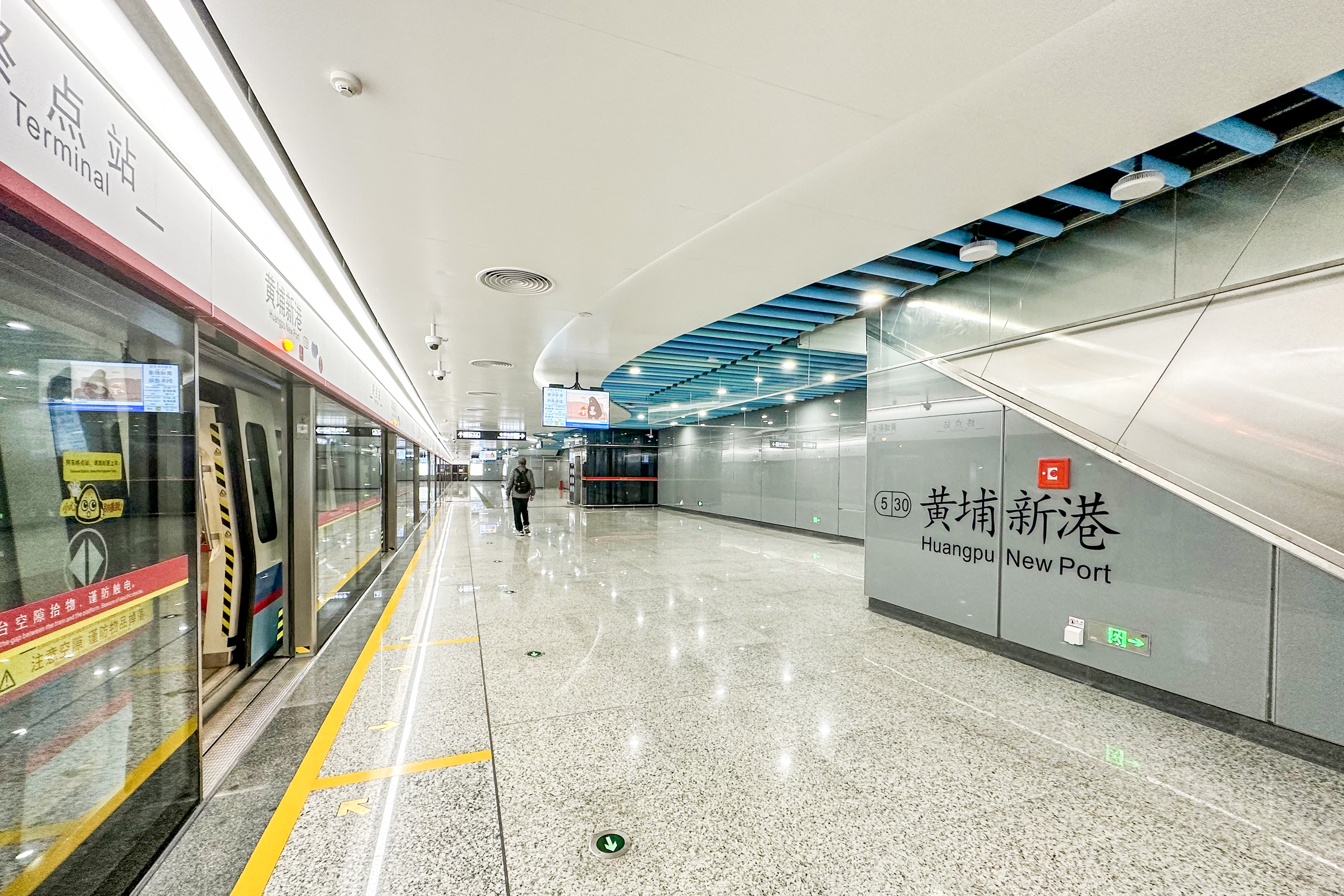
Platform 1 (terminating platform)

== History ==
In November 2020, in order to cooperate with the construction of this station, the traffic police department implemented closed enclosure construction at the intersection of Kaifa Avenue and Baoshi Road. In December 2021, the shield tunnel section from Guangzhou Development Zone (now Xiagang) to this station became the first tunnel section to be completed on the eastern extension.

The station capped in October 2022, making it the 5th station on the eastern extension on the line to do so.

During the planning phase, this station was called Huangpu Passenger Port station. On 27 February 2023, the Guangzhou Civil Affairs Bureau announced the initial names of stations on the east extension of Line 5, and this station was renamed to Huangpu New Port station.

The station completed the "three rights" transfer on 31 October 2023. It opened on 28 December 2023 along with the eastern extension of Line 5.

== Future development ==
The station is planned to be an interchange with Lines 17, 25 and Dongguan Line 1. Among them, the Line 5 station reserved a cross-shaped node transfer, and the new line platform was reserved under the Line 5 platforms. It was originally planned for Line 25, but recent planning changes meant that the line changed its alignment and will no longer stop at this station, therefore the current plan is to have the reserved platforms used by Dongguan Rail Transit Line 1.
