= Jiaokou station =

Guangzhou Metro station

Coordinates: 23.1137°N 113.2085°E

Jiaokou 滘口
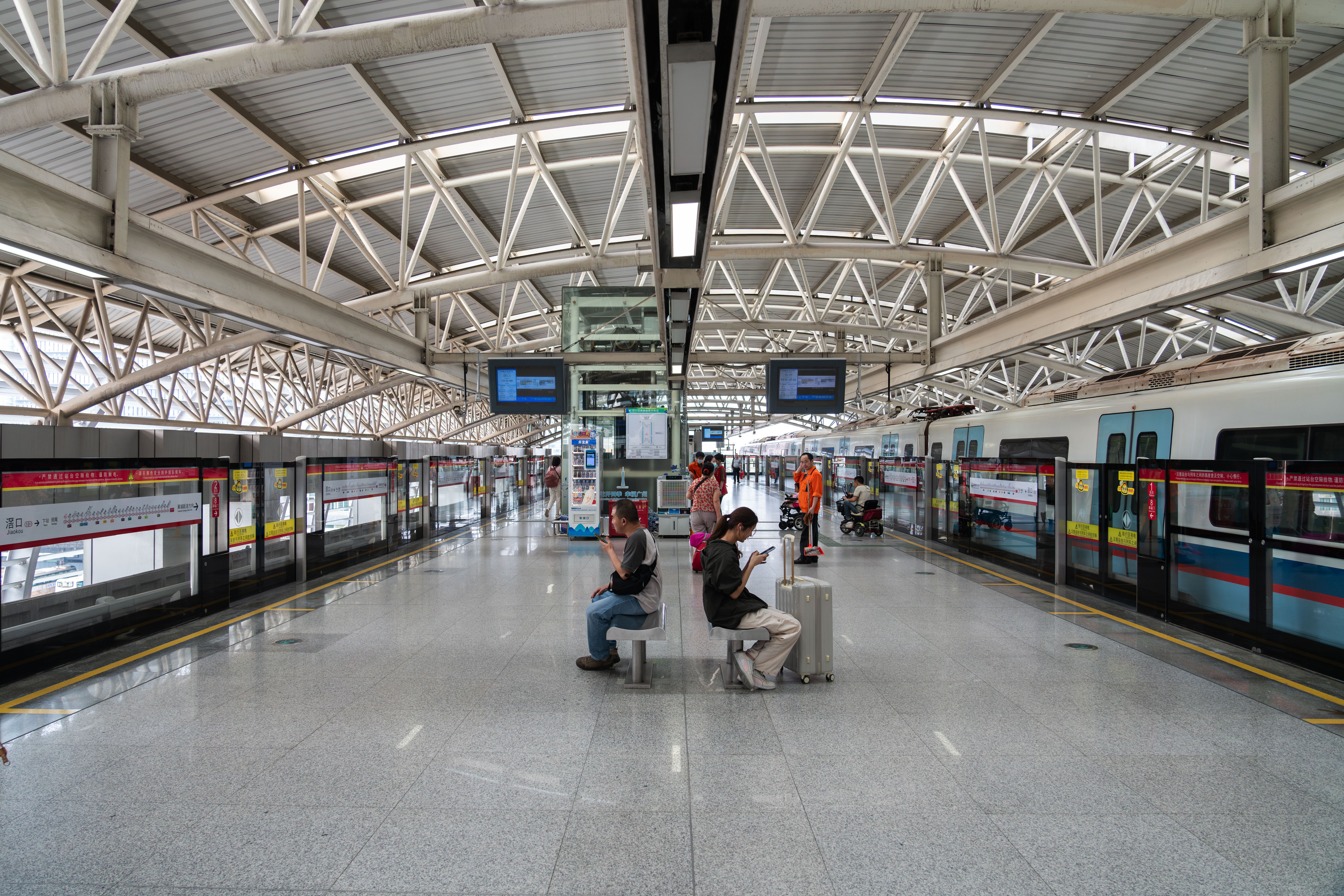
- Platform

Chinese name
- Chinese: 滘口站
Transcriptions
Standard Mandarin
- Hanyu Pinyin: Jiāokǒu Zhàn
Yue: Cantonese
- Yale Romanization: Gaauháu Jaahm
- Jyutping: Gaau^{3}hau^{2} Zaam^{6}
- Hong Kong Romanization: Kau Hau station

General information
- Location: Liwan District, Guangzhou, Guangdong; China
- Operated by: Guangzhou Metro Co. Ltd.
- Line: Line 5
- Platforms: 2 (1 island platform)
- Tracks: 2

Construction
- Structure type: Elevated
- Accessible: Yes

Other information
- Station code: 501

History
- Opened: 28 December 2009; 16 years ago

Services
Preceding station	Guangzhou Metro	Following station
Terminus	Line 5	Tanwei towards Huangpu New Port
Location

Jiaokou Station (Chinese: 滘口站; Jyutping: gaau^{3} hau^{2} zaam^{6}; Cantonese Yale: Gaauháu Jaahm) is an elevated terminus on Line 5 of the Guangzhou Metro. It is located on Fangcun Avenue West (芳村大道西) near its namesake, the Jiaokou Coach Terminal (滘口客运站) in Fangcun, Liwan District, Guangzhou. It opened on 28 December 2009.

== History ==
A station in this area was first proposed in the Guangzhou Fast Rail Transit Network Design Report in 1997. A line would start in Sanyanqiao, pass through Jiaokou, then continue along what became the route of modern day Line 6. Another line roughly resembling modern Line 5 was also proposed in this report, but its eastern terminus was further north in Jinshazhou. By 2003, the eastern ends of these two lines had been swapped and the Sanyanqiao - Jiaokou station dropped, forming the modern day Line 5. The exact site of the station was announced in early 2004.

The main structure of the station was completed in August 2009. The station opened with the rest of Line 5 on 28 December 2009.

=== Future Lines ===
In 2007, plans emerged for a Foshan Metro line (also numbered Line 5) to run from Shunde district into Jiaokou, providing an interchange with Guangzhou Metro Line 5. By 2017, this had changed to a Line 6 running from the town of Dali.

== Station layout ==
Like Tanwei station, Jiaokou is on a viaduct. The track layout has trains reversing direction on the platform, instead of the slightly more common layout of having trains arrive on one platform, proceed into a siding before reversing direction and emerging on the other platform.

F3; Platforms	Platform 2	5 towards Huangpu New Port (Tanwei)
F3; Platforms	Island platform, doors will open on the left
F3; Platforms	Platform 1	5 towards Huangpu New Port (Tanwei)
F3; Platforms	-	For parking spare train only
M Equipment Area	-	Station equipment
F2; Concourse	Lobby	Ticket Machines, Customer Service, Police Station, Safety Facilities, Toilets
G	-	Exits, Jiaokou Transportation Hub

== Exits ==
Exit number		Exit location
Exit A	A1	Fangcun Dadaoxi
Exit A	A2	Fangxing Lu
Exit B	B1	Fangcun Dadaoxi
Exit B	B2	Fangcun Dadaoxi
