= Keyun Lu station =

Keyun Lu station or Keyunlu station may refer to:

- Keyun Lu station (Guangzhou Metro), station of Guangzhou Metro
- Keyunlu railway station, station of Pearl River Delta Intercity Railway
