= Keyunlu railway station =

Guangdong Intercity railway station in Guangzhou, China

Keyunlu 科韵路
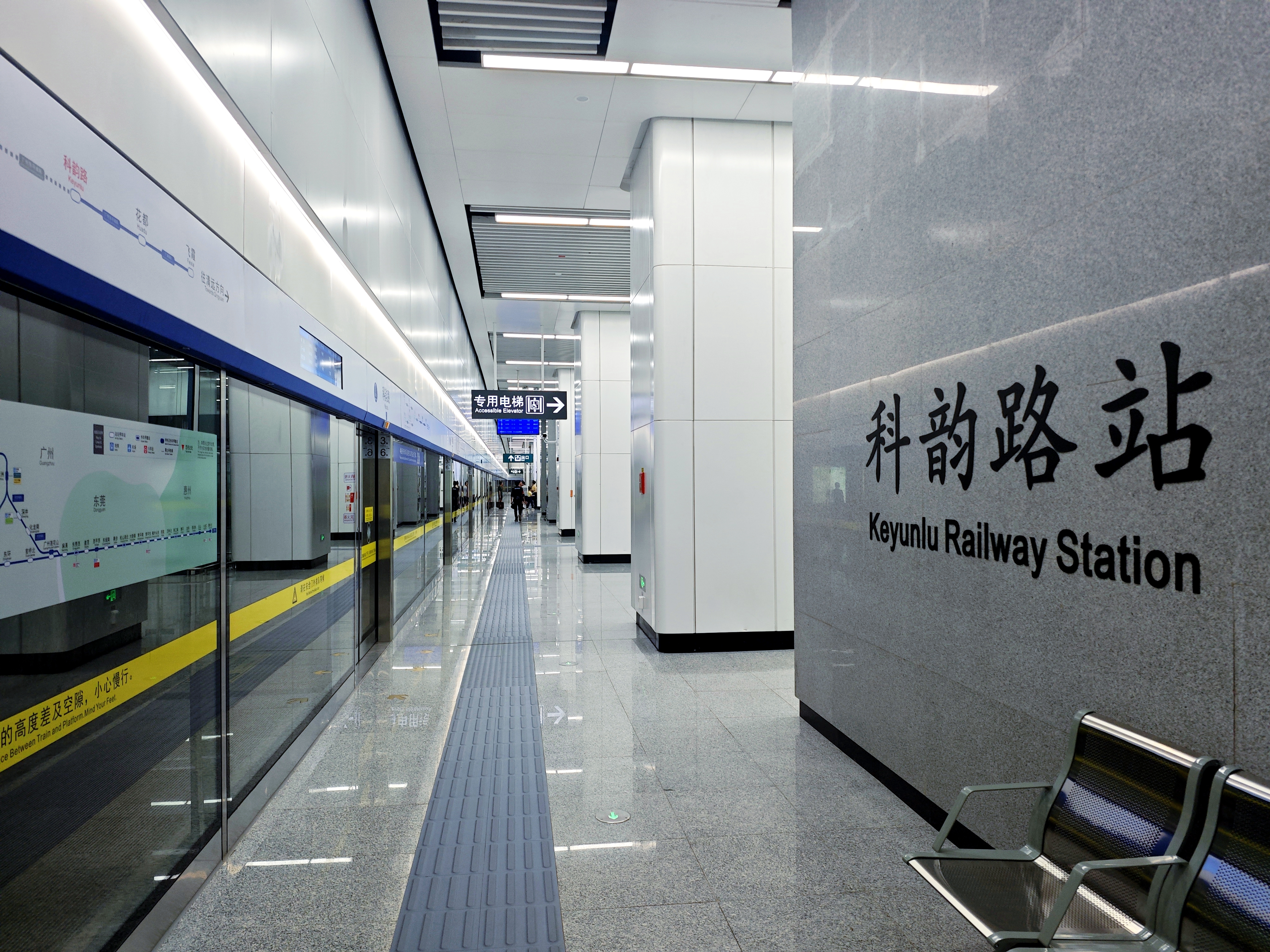
- Platform 1

Chinese name
- Simplified Chinese: 科韵路站
- Traditional Chinese: 科韻路站
Transcriptions
Standard Mandarin
- Hanyu Pinyin: Kēyùn Lù Zhàn
Yue: Cantonese
- Yale Romanization: Fōwáhn Louh Jaahm
- Jyutping: Fo^{1}wan^{5} Lou^{6} Zaam^{6}

General information
- Location: Northwest corner of Guangzhou International Financial City Plaza; Yuancun Subdistrict, Tianhe District, Guangzhou, Guangdong; China
- Coordinates: 23°7′10.63″N 113°22′23.05″E
- Owner: Pearl River Delta Metropolitan Region intercity railway
- Operator: Guangdong Intercity
- Line: Guangzhou East Ring intercity railway
- Platforms: 2 (1 island platform)
- Tracks: 2
- Connections: 5 Keyun Lu

Construction
- Structure type: Underground
- Accessible: Yes

Other information
- Station code: KEA (Pinyin: KYL)

History
- Opened: 29 September 2025 (10 months ago)

Services
| Preceding station | Pearl River Delta Metropolitan Region Intercity Railway | Following station |
|---|---|---|
| Cencun towards Huadu | Guangzhou East Ring intercity railway | Pazhou towards Panyu |
Transfer at Keyun Lu
| Preceding station | Guangzhou Metro | Following station |
| Yuancun towards Jiaokou | Line 5 transfer at Keyun Lu | Chebeinan towards Huangpu New Port |
Location

Keyunlu railway station (Chinese: 科韵路站; pinyin: Kēyùn Lù Zhàn; Cantonese Yale: Fōwáhn Louh Jaahm; lit. 'Keyun Road Station') is an underground railway station on Guangzhou East Ring intercity railway located in Tianhe District, Guangzhou, Guangdong, China. It opened on 29 September 2025.

== Features ==
The station has an underground island platform. It has 2 wind shafts and a cooling tower.

Above the station is the Guangzhou International Financial City Plaza, and the exterior station shape is based on the theme of "Koi Carp Jade".

=== Entrances/exits ===
The station has 2 points of entry/exit. In addition, during construction of the station, a passage was reserved to connect to the metro station of the same name, but the ancillary facilities of the Guangzhou Financial Plaza were still under construction, and the relevant passages could not be put into use with the opening of the intercity railway. Passengers are currently required to exit from Exit E of the station and proceed to Entrance B of the corresponding metro station via surface level to transfer.

- E: Jinshuo 1st Road, 5 Keyun Lu
- F: Huangpu Avenue Middle
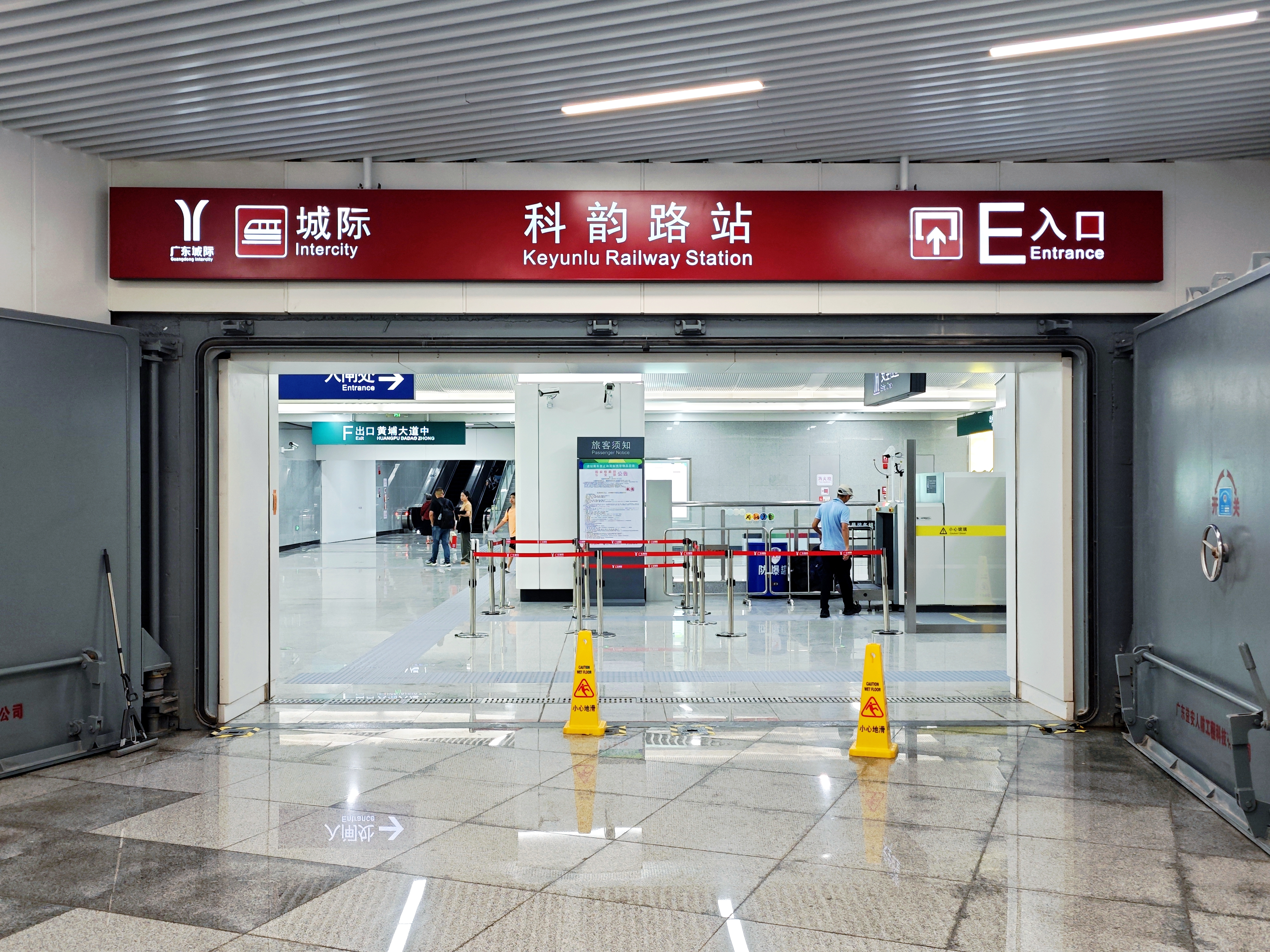
Entrance E

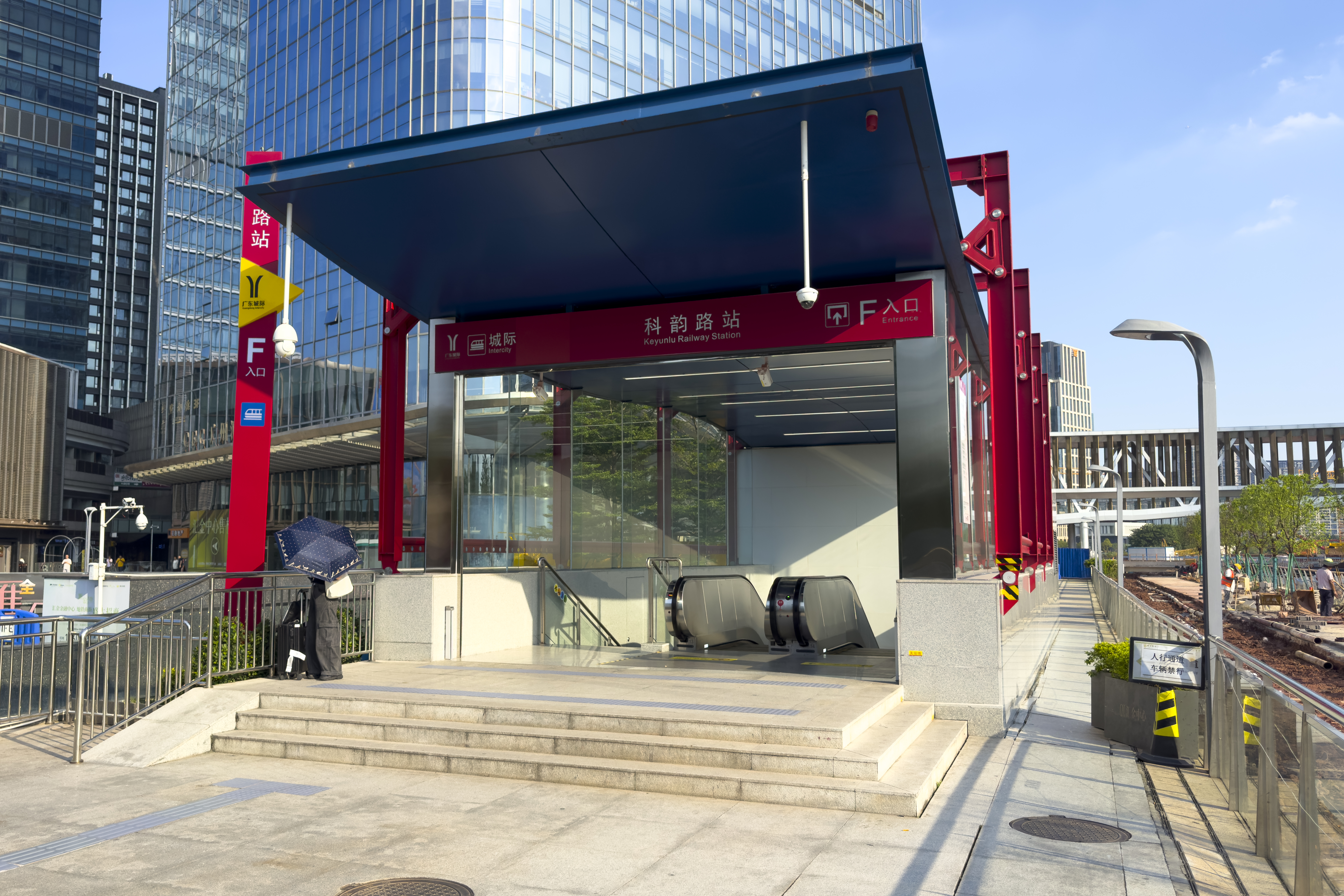
Entrance F

== Gallery ==
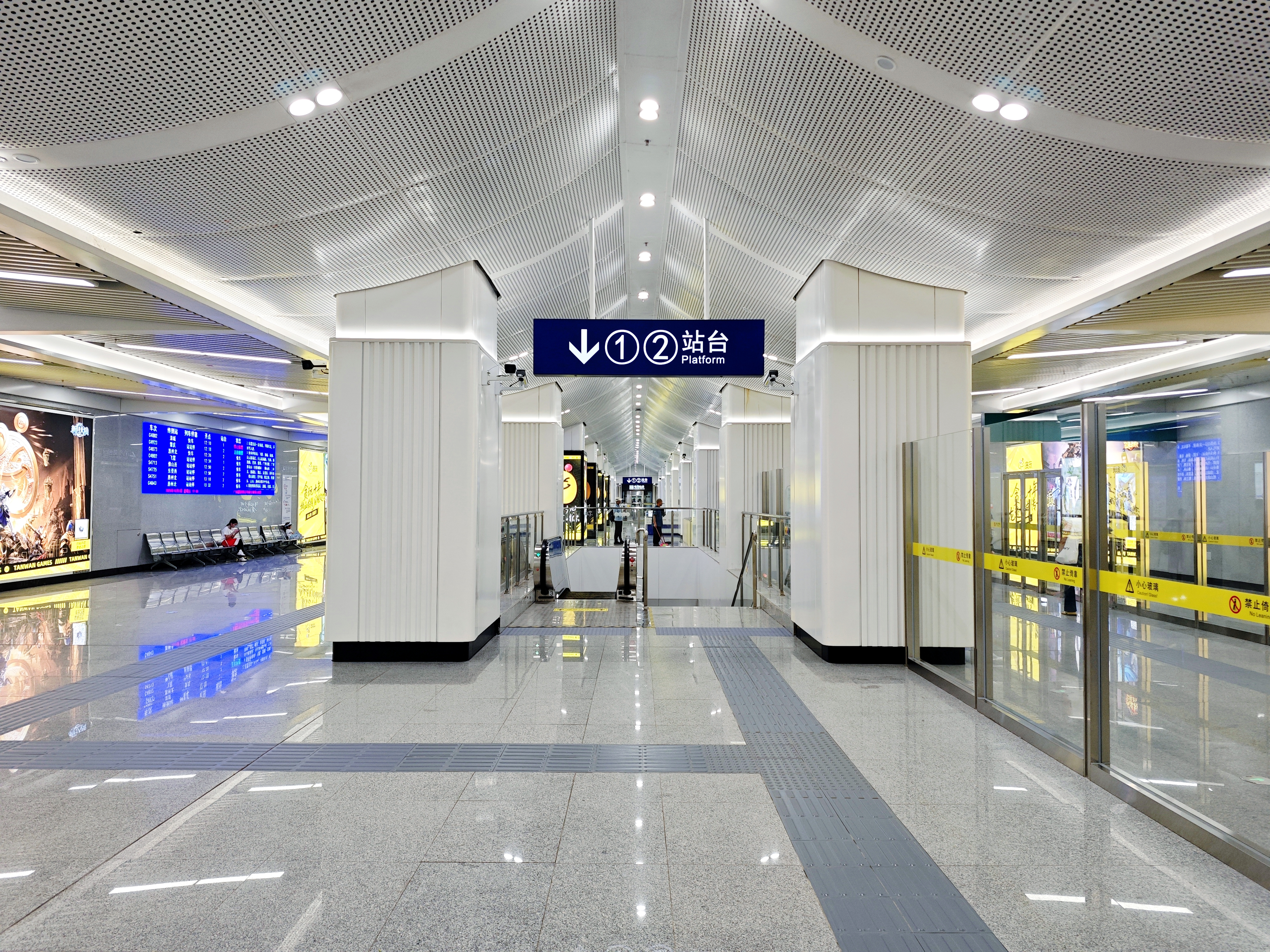
Concourse

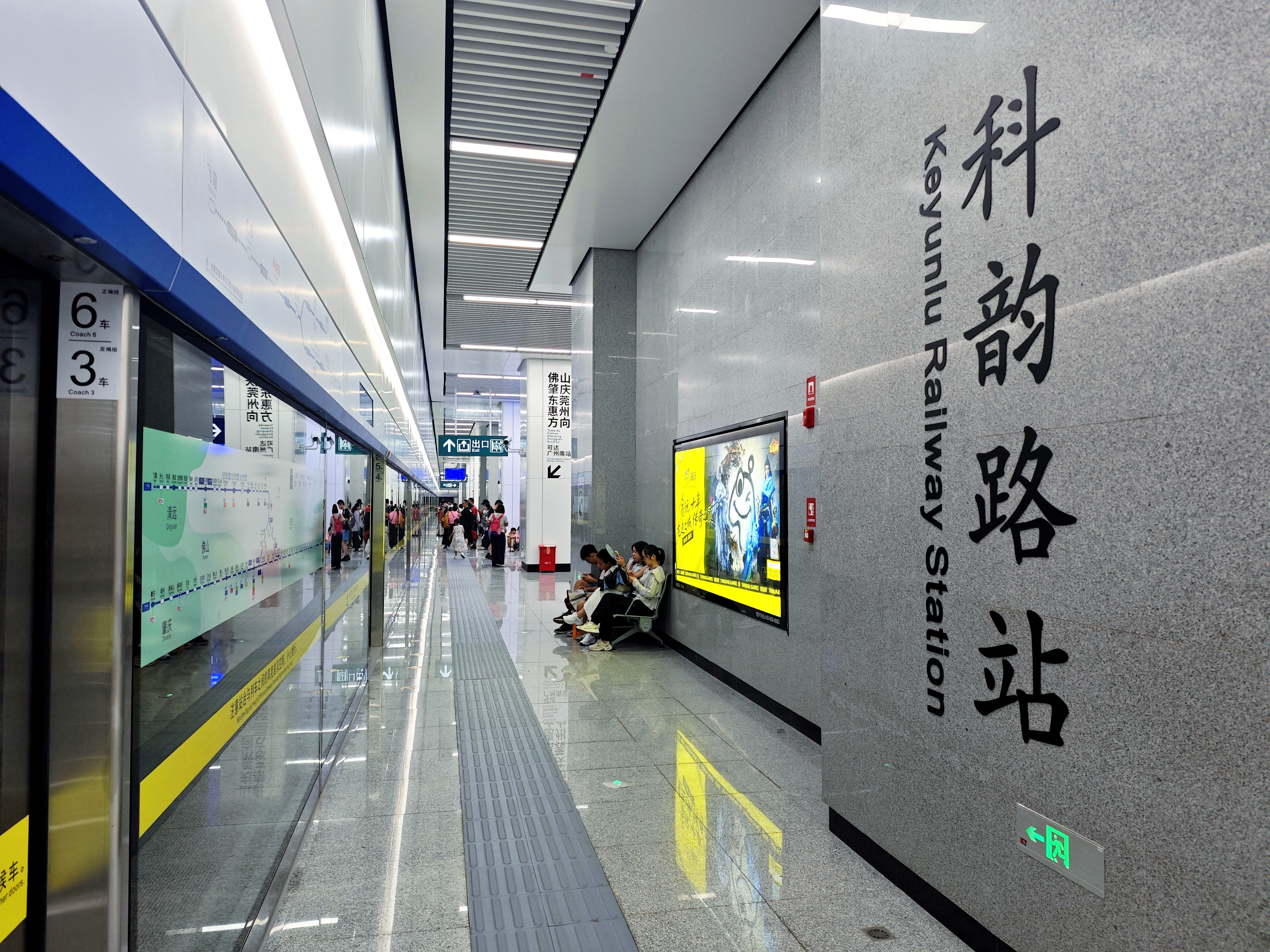
Platform 2

== History ==
The station was called Financial City station during the planning and construction phase. Before opening, the station was renamed to Keyunlu station.

On the morning of 23 October 2018, the Guangzhou Financial City Station comprehensive transportation hub project began construction.

On 29 September 2025, the station opened.

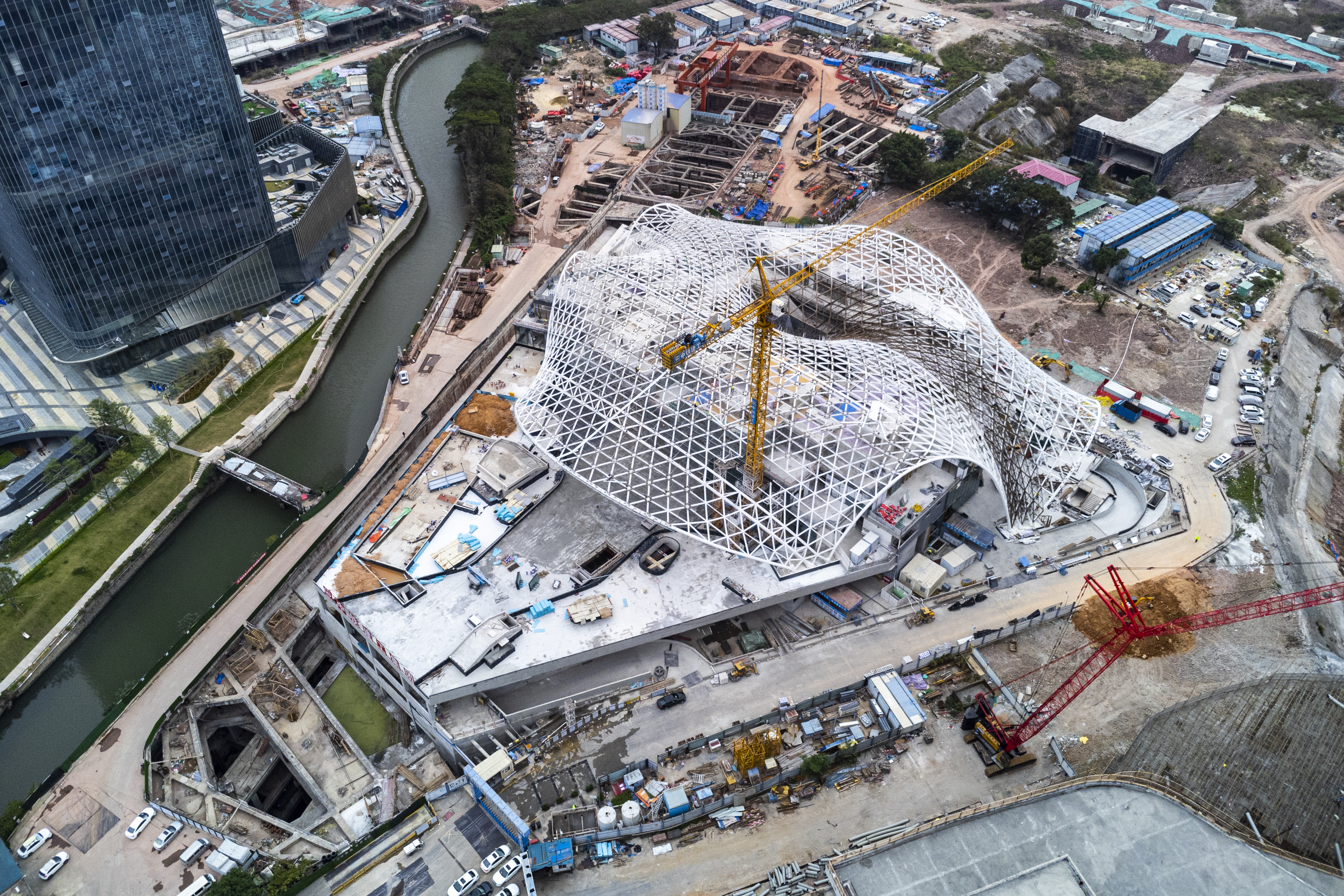
Construction site (January 2023)
