= Dongpu station =

Guangzhou Metro station

Coordinates: 23.10937°N 113.40152°E

Dongpu 东圃
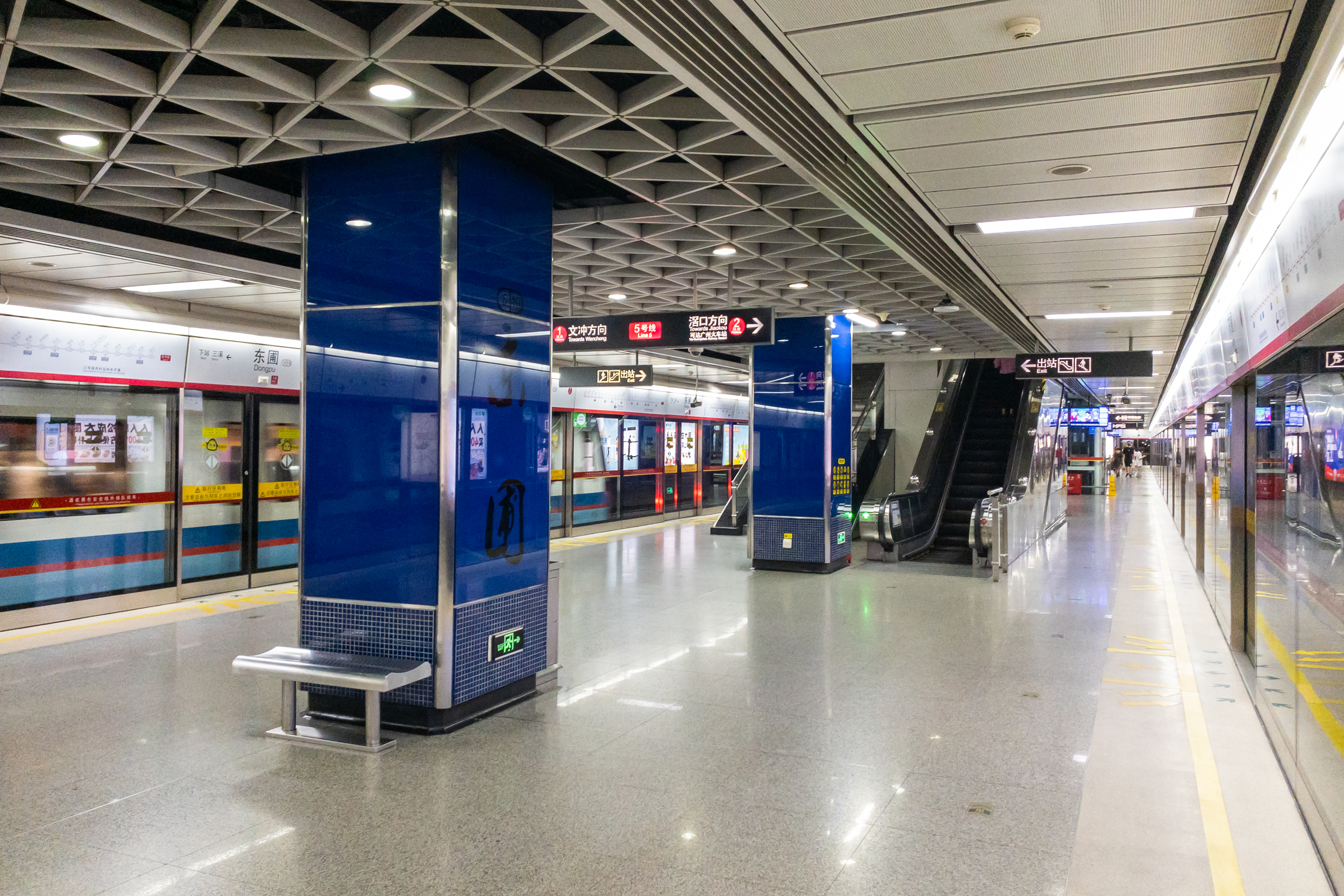

Chinese name
- Simplified Chinese: 东圃站
- Traditional Chinese: 東圃站
Transcriptions
Standard Mandarin
- Hanyu Pinyin: Dōngpǔ Zhàn
Yue: Cantonese
- Yale Romanization: Dūngpóu Jaahm
- Jyutping: Dung^{1}pou^{2} Zaam^{6}

General information
- Location: Huangpu Avenue East (黄埔大道东); Tianhe District, Guangzhou, Guangdong; China
- Operated by: Guangzhou Metro Co. Ltd.
- Line: Line 5
- Platforms: 2 (1 island platform)

Construction
- Structure type: Underground

Other information
- Station code: 519

History
- Opened: 28 December 2009; 16 years ago

Services
Preceding station	Guangzhou Metro	Following station
Chebeinan towards Jiaokou	Line 5	Sanxi towards Huangpu New Port
Location

Dongpu Station (simplified Chinese: 东圃站; traditional Chinese: 東圃站; Cantonese Yale: Dūngpóu Jaahm) is a station on Line 5 of the Guangzhou Metro. It is located underground Huangpu Avenue East (黄埔大道东) to the west of the Guangzhou Ring Road Expressway (广州环城高速公路) in the Tianhe District. It opened on 28 December 2009.
