= Happy Valley (Guangzhou) =

Happy Valley 太阳新天地购物中心

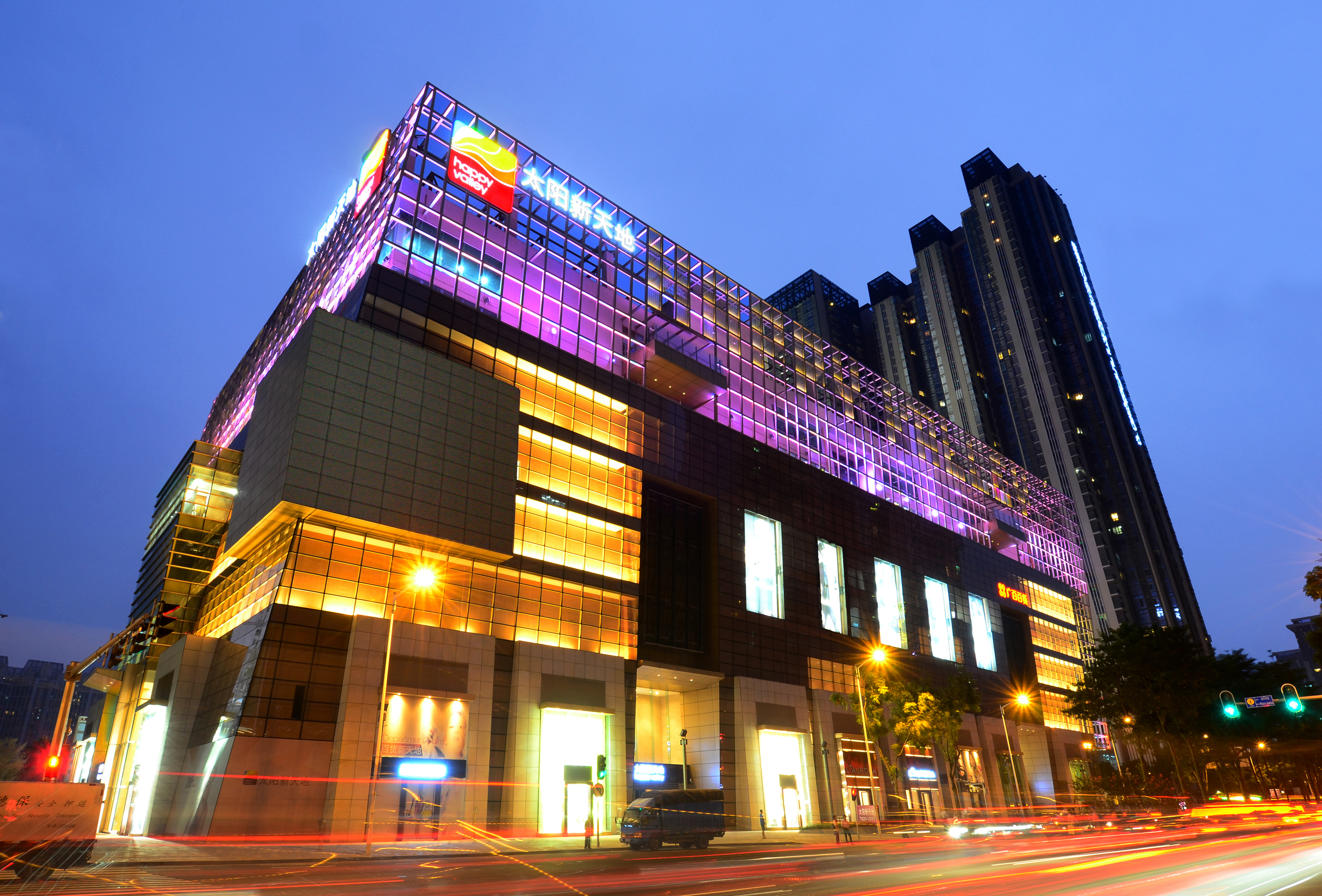
- The Happy Valley Mall at night
- Interactive map of the Happy Valley 太阳新天地购物中心 area

General information
- Status: Completed
- Location: Zhujiang New Town, Tianhe District, Guangzhou, China, 36 Ma Chang Road, Zhu Jiang New Town, Guangzhou, China
- Coordinates: 23.123804°N 113.3441°E
- Opening: 28 September 2012

Technical details
- Floor count: 12
- Floor area: 150,000 square metres (1,620,000 square feet)

Design and construction
- Architect: Altoon-Partners
- Developer: Paragon Group (Guangzhou)

Website
- http://www.happyvalleygz.com/

Happy Valley (simplified Chinese: 太阳新天地购物中心; traditional Chinese: 太陽新天地購物中心; pinyin: Tàiyáng xīntiāndì; Jyutping: Taai^{3}joeng^{4} san^{1}tin^{1}dei^{6}) is a shopping mall in the Zhujiang New Town of the Tianhe District, Guangzhou, China.

== Overview ==
The mall, completed in 2012, has 150,000 m^{2} (1,600,000 sq ft) of floor space designed by Altoon-Partners and Benoy Ltd. The total floor area makes it the biggest shopping mall in Zhujiang New Town. The mall is managed by the Paragon Group (Guangzhou).

The mall is home to many multinational retailers such as Class Cavalli of Roberto Cavalli, Maxvalu Tokai, Uniqlo, Dirk Bikkembergs, NEW LOOK, H&M, MUJI, and is home to the Guangzhou flagship venue of China Film Cinema.

The English and Chinese names of the shopping mall are unrelated: the Chinese name is 太陽新天地購物中心 (“Sun Plaza Shopping Center”).

== Location and accessibility ==
Happy Valley is located at 36 Ma Chang Road, Guangzhou. There are 1200 dedicated parking spaces and the location is well accessible through public transport by a bus stop in front of the mall and Guangzhou Metro Line 5 at close by Tancun Station.

The Happy Valley Mall is within close walking distance to several luxurious residential properties such as The Canton Mansion, Guangzhou Yitong Mansion and Yu Feng Park Towers. The mall is also adjacent to premium office space including the China Unicom Square, the GRC Cooperative Union, the Fuli Kexun Building, and is within a 10-minute drive from the Guangzhou International Finance Center.

The mall is in the proximity of Zhujiang Park, as well as Guangzhou Jockey Club and the “72 Golf” Golf Driving Range. Jinan University (the first university in China to recruit foreign students and the university with the largest number of international students) is located across Huangpu Avenue.

The mall is also in the vicinity of a host of leading hotels and serviced apartments such as The Vanburgh Hotel, The Jockey Club Hotel, W Hotel, The Guangzhou Ritz-Carlton Hotel and Ascott IFC apartments of The Ascott Limited.

== History ==
10 January 2012	Construction completed
28 September 2012	Grand Opening
28 September – 7 October 2012	The Harley Davidson Motor Exhibition
29 September – 31 October 2012	Taiwan Festival
November 2012	Fashion Month 2012
18 May 2013	Stephy Qi Album Signing event
19 May 2013	Mayors attend Short-film Premiere at Happy Valley (Guangzhou)
29 May 2013	“The Wedding Diary” Film Premiere
6 June 2013	“7 Assassins” Movie Premier
9 June 2013	Denise Ho "Coexistence" Autograph Session
28 July 2013	Charlene Choi "Blooming" Autograph Session
12 August 2013	"Palace Lock Sinensis" Movie Premiere
17 August 2013	Gloria Tang "Xposed" Signing Session
23 August 2013	Garuda Indonesia Tourism & Culture Exhibition
15 September 2013	Vanness Wu’s New Album "Different Man" signing
19 September 2013	Liu Xin "Flower Girl" Book Signing Session
26–27 September 2013	"Miracle Dream Mill" Guangzhou Audition, hosted by Simon Yam
13 October 2013	Happy Valley Mall 1st Anniversary, hosted by Chace Crawford

== See also ==
TaiKoo Hui—another international shopping mall in Guangzhou's Tianhe District.
