= Tancun station =

Guangzhou Metro station

Coordinates: 23.1174°N 113.3456°E

Tancun 潭村
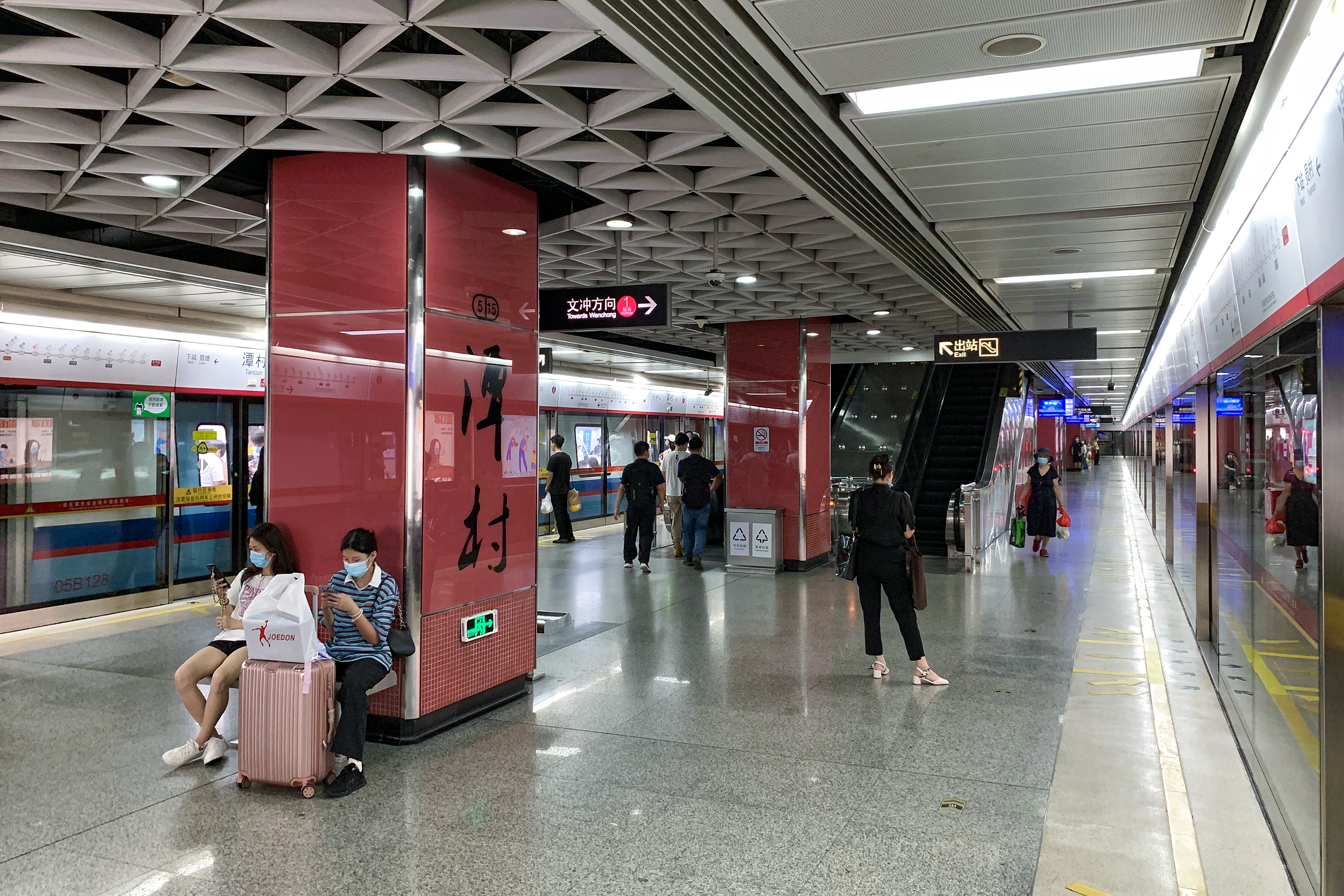

Chinese name
- Chinese: 潭村站
Transcriptions
Standard Mandarin
- Hanyu Pinyin: Táncūn Zhàn
Yue: Cantonese
- Yale Romanization: Tàahmchyūn Jaahm
- Jyutping: Taam^{4}cyun^{1} Zaam^{6}

General information
- Location: Huacheng Avenue (花城大道); Tianhe District, Guangzhou, Guangdong; China
- Operated by: Guangzhou Metro Co. Ltd.
- Line: Line 5
- Platforms: 2 (1 island platform)

Construction
- Structure type: Underground

Other information
- Station code: 515

History
- Opened: 28 December 2009; 16 years ago

Services
Preceding station	Guangzhou Metro	Following station
Liede towards Jiaokou	Line 5	Yuancun towards Huangpu New Port
Location

Tancun Station (Chinese: 潭村站; Cantonese Yale: Tàahmchyūn Jaahm), formerly known as Saimachang Station (赛马场站; 賽馬場站; Choimáhchèuhng Jaahm; literally Racecourse Station) whilst in the planning stage, is a station on Line 5 of the Guangzhou Metro. It is located under Huacheng Avenue (花城大道) in the Tianhe District, near Guangzhou Racecourse (广州赛马场). It opened on 28 December 2009.

== Around the station ==
- Happy Valley
