= Yuancun station (Guangzhou Metro) =

Guangzhou Metro Line 5 and Line 11 station

Yuancun 员村
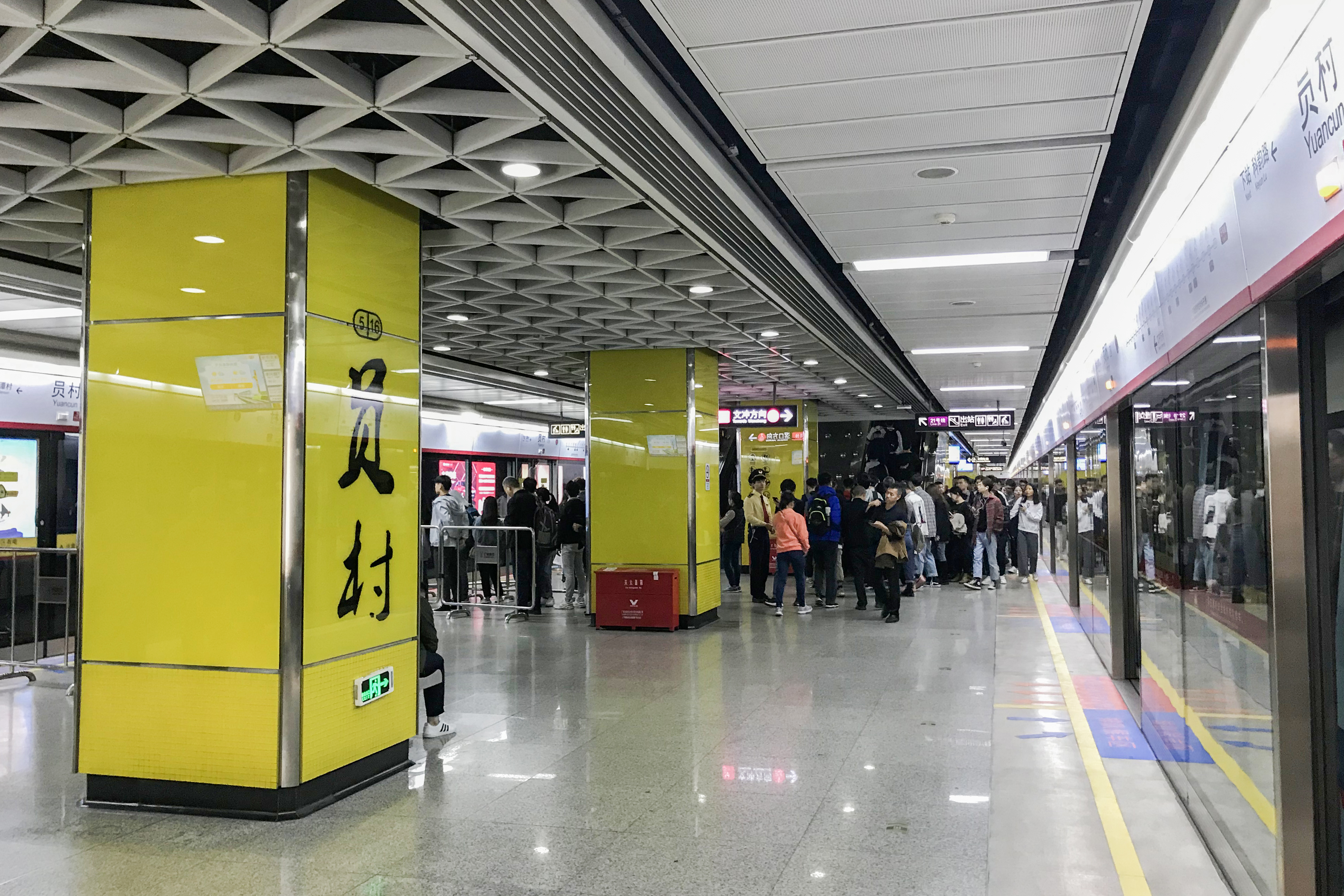
- Line 5 platform

Chinese name
- Simplified Chinese: 员村站
- Traditional Chinese: 員村站
Transcriptions
Standard Mandarin
- Hanyu Pinyin: Yuáncūn Zhàn
Yue: Cantonese
- Yale Romanization: Yùhnchyūn Jaahm
- Jyutping: Jyun^{4}cyun^{1} Zaam^{6}

General information
- Location: Intersection of Huacheng Avenue East (花城大道东) and Yuancun 2nd Cross Road (员村二横路), Yuancun Subdistrict; Tianhe District, Guangzhou, Guangdong; China
- Coordinates: 23°7′5.32″N 113°21′29.89″E
- Operator: Guangzhou Metro Co. Ltd.
- Lines: Line 5; Line 11
- Platforms: 4 (2 island platforms)
- Tracks: 4

Construction
- Structure type: Underground
- Accessible: Yes

Other information
- Station code: 516 1103

History
- Opened: Line 5: 28 December 2009 (16 years ago); Line 21: 20 December 2019 (6 years ago); Line 11: 28 December 2024 (19 months ago)
- Closed: Line 21: 2 October 2024 (22 months ago)

Services
Preceding station	Guangzhou Metro	Following station
Tancun towards Jiaokou	Line 5	Keyun Lu towards Huangpu New Port
Tianhe Park Outer Circle	Line 11	Pazhou Inner Circle
Location

Yuancun station (simplified Chinese: 员村站; traditional Chinese: 員村站; pinyin: Yuáncūn Zhàn; Cantonese Yale: Yùhnchyūn Jaahm) is an interchange station between Line 5 and Line 11 of the Guangzhou Metro. It is located under the junction of Huacheng Avenue East (Chinese: 花城大道东) and Yuancun 2nd Cross Road (Chinese: 员村二横路) in Tianhe District. It lies to the east of Zhujiang New Town and to the north of Pazhou, and was opened on 28 December 2009. Line 11 started operations at this station on 28 December 2024.

Prior to the opening of Line 11, the dismantling work of the section from this station to Tianhe Park of Line 21 took place between 2 October 2024 and 27 December 2024, and the terminus of Line 21 was adjusted north to Tianhe Park. The 6B train type's shielding doors and glass panel false walls of the outer platform were removed, and then the appropriate shielding doors of the 8A train type were installed. At the same time, it was necessary to dismantle the outer platform and the third track between the station and the Tianhe Park station area and replace the signal system to Line 11 standards.

== Usage ==
There are many residential communities and natural estates around the station, and there are also many primary and secondary schools nearby, so there is a large number of passengers entering and exiting on weekdays. After the opening of the remaining section of Line 21, the station became an interchange station for Line 5 and Line 21, attracting a large number of passengers to transfer at this station, making the station more congested during peak hours and increasing the passenger pressure of Line 5. After Line 21 was shortened to Tianhe Park in October 2024, the congestion at the station during peak hours was greatly alleviated.

Currently, passenger flow control measures are in place between 07:45 and 09:30 on weekdays.

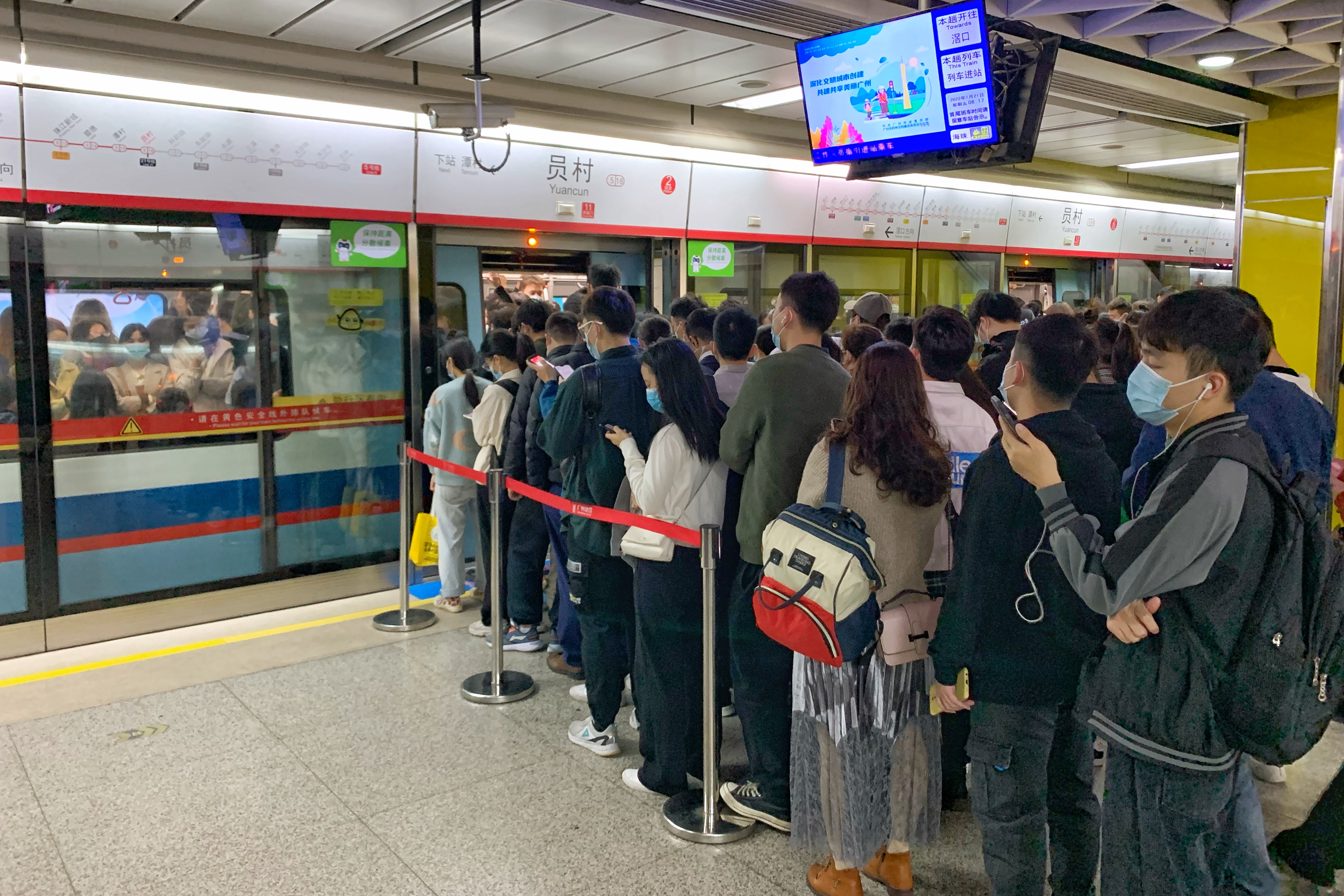
Line 5 platform 2 during peak hours

== Station layout ==
=== Line 5 ===
G	-	Exits B, C, D
L1; Concourse	5 Lobby	Ticket Machines, Customer Service, Shops, Police Station, Security Facilities, Towards Line 11 Upper concourse
L2; Platforms	Platform 2	5 towards Jiaokou (Tancun)
L2; Platforms	Island platform, doors will open on the left
L2; Platforms	Platform 1	5 towards Huangpu New Port (Keyun Lu)
L2; Platforms	-	Station Equipment

=== Line 11 ===
G	-	Exits A, E, F
L1; Concourse	11 Upper Lobby	Ticket Machines, Customer Service, Shops, Security Facilities, Towards Line 5 concourse
L1; Concourse	Exit A Mezzanine Level	Safety Facilities, Towards Exit A and lower concourse
L2	11 Lower Lobby	Ticket Machines, Customer Service
L3	-	Station Equipment
L4; Platforms	Platform 3	11 Inner Circle (Pazhou)
L4; Platforms	Island platform, doors will open on the left (Toilets, Nursery)
L4; Platforms	Platform 4	11 Outer Circle (Tianhe Park)

=== Entrances/exits ===
The station has 6 points of entry/exit. Exits B and C and the original Exit A opened with the station's initial opening, and Exit D was opened in 2018. When Line 21 opened, the station added new Exits E and F and relocated Exit A, and a new transfer passage to the Line 21 upper concourse was also added at the subsequent Exit B.

- A: Yuancun 2nd Cross Road
- B: Yuancun 2nd Cross Road
- C: Yuancun 2nd Cross Road, Sixth Affiliated Hospital of Sun Yat-sen University
- D: Yuancun 2nd Cross Road
- E: Yuancun 2nd Cross Road
- F: Yuancun 2nd Cross Road

Exit B is equipped with a stairlift, and Exits A and E are equipped with elevators.

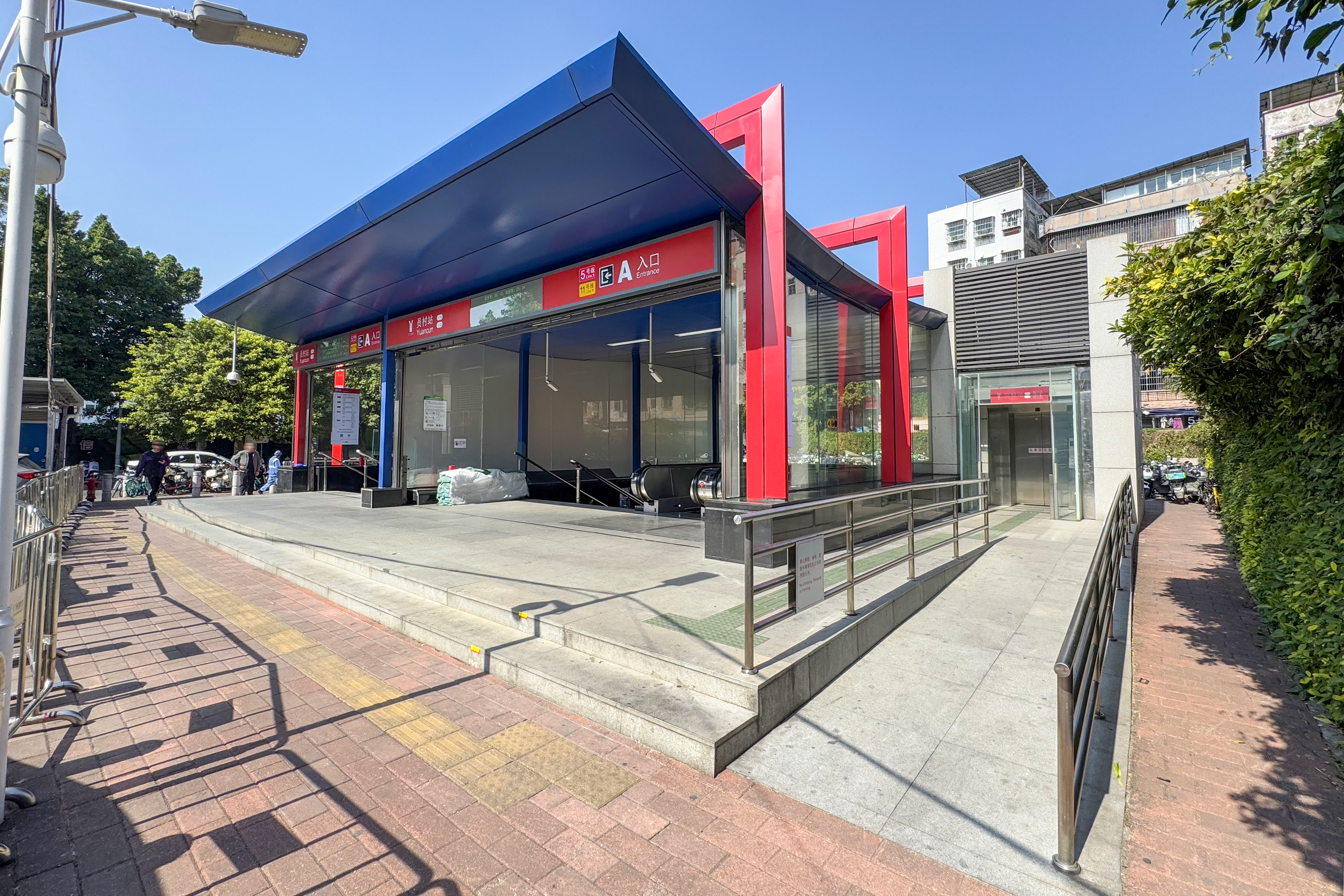
Entrance A

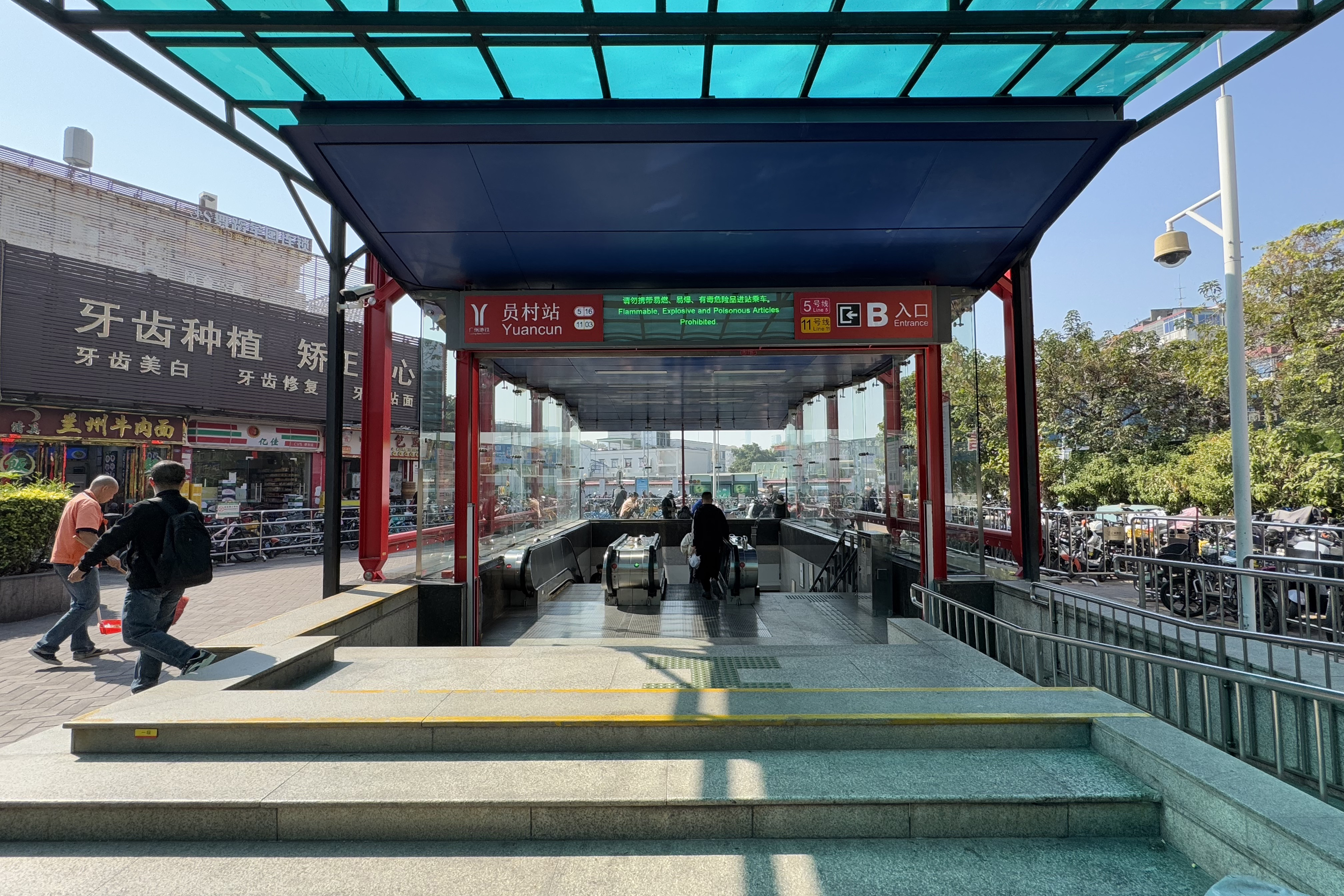
Entrance B

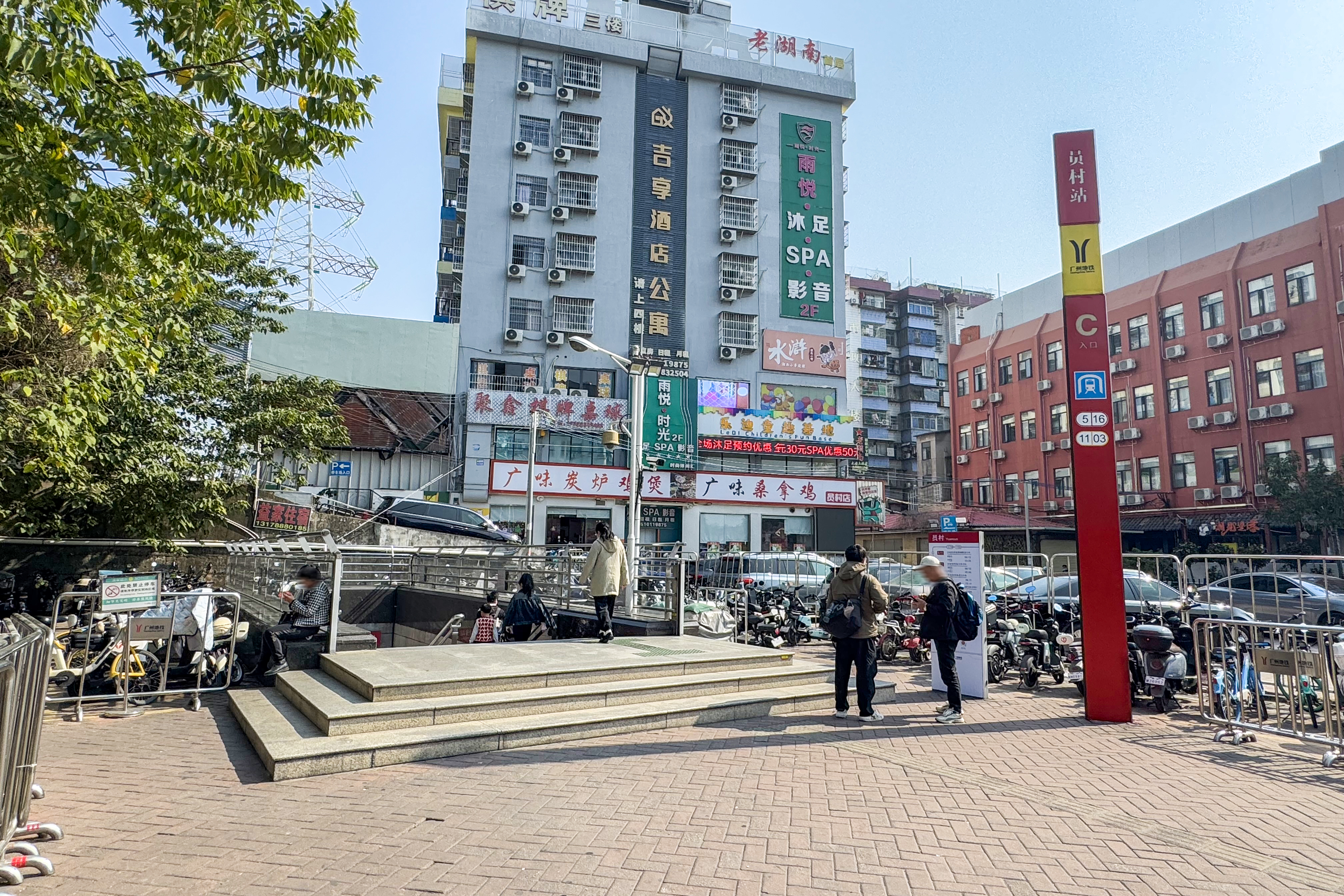
Entrance C

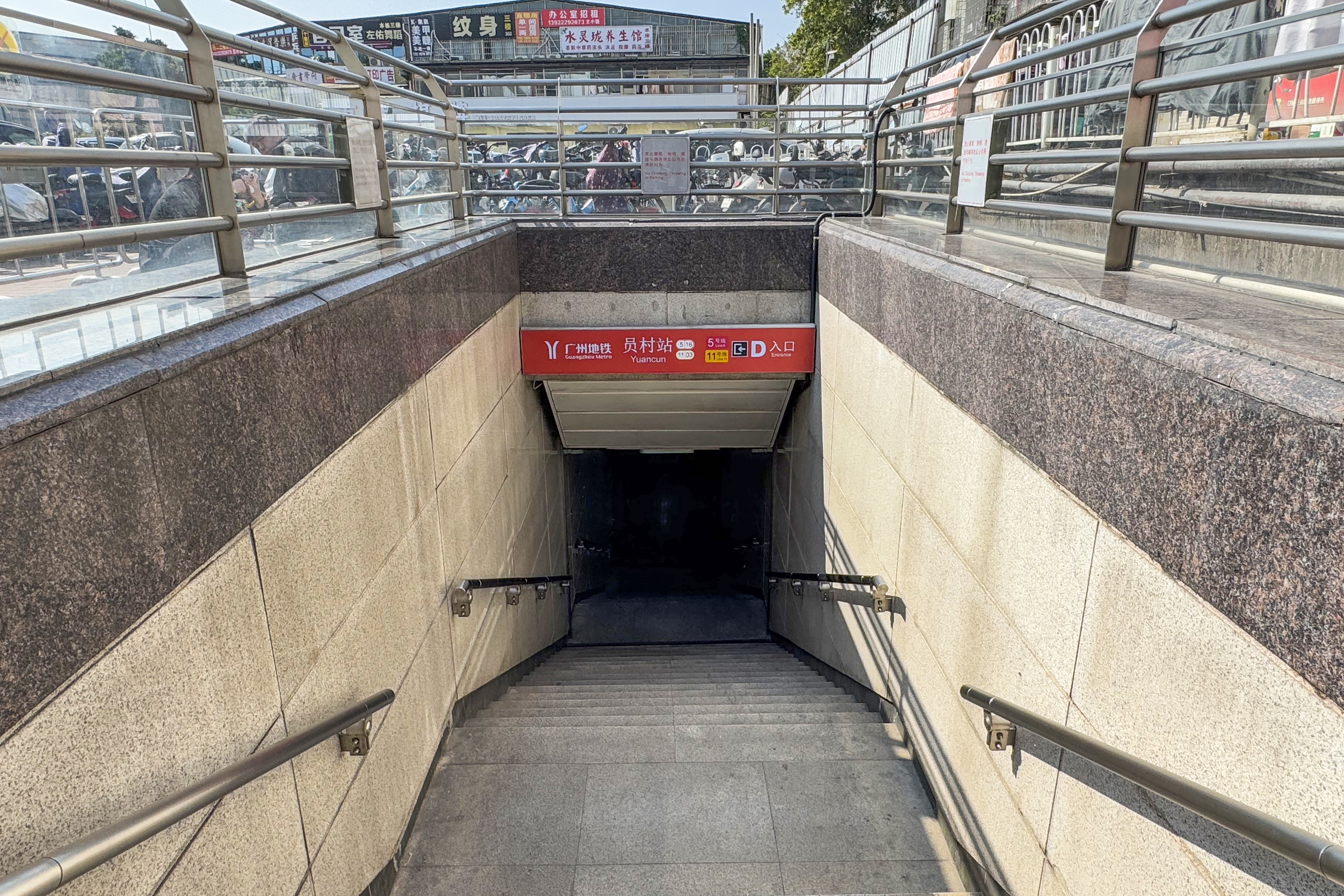
Entrance D

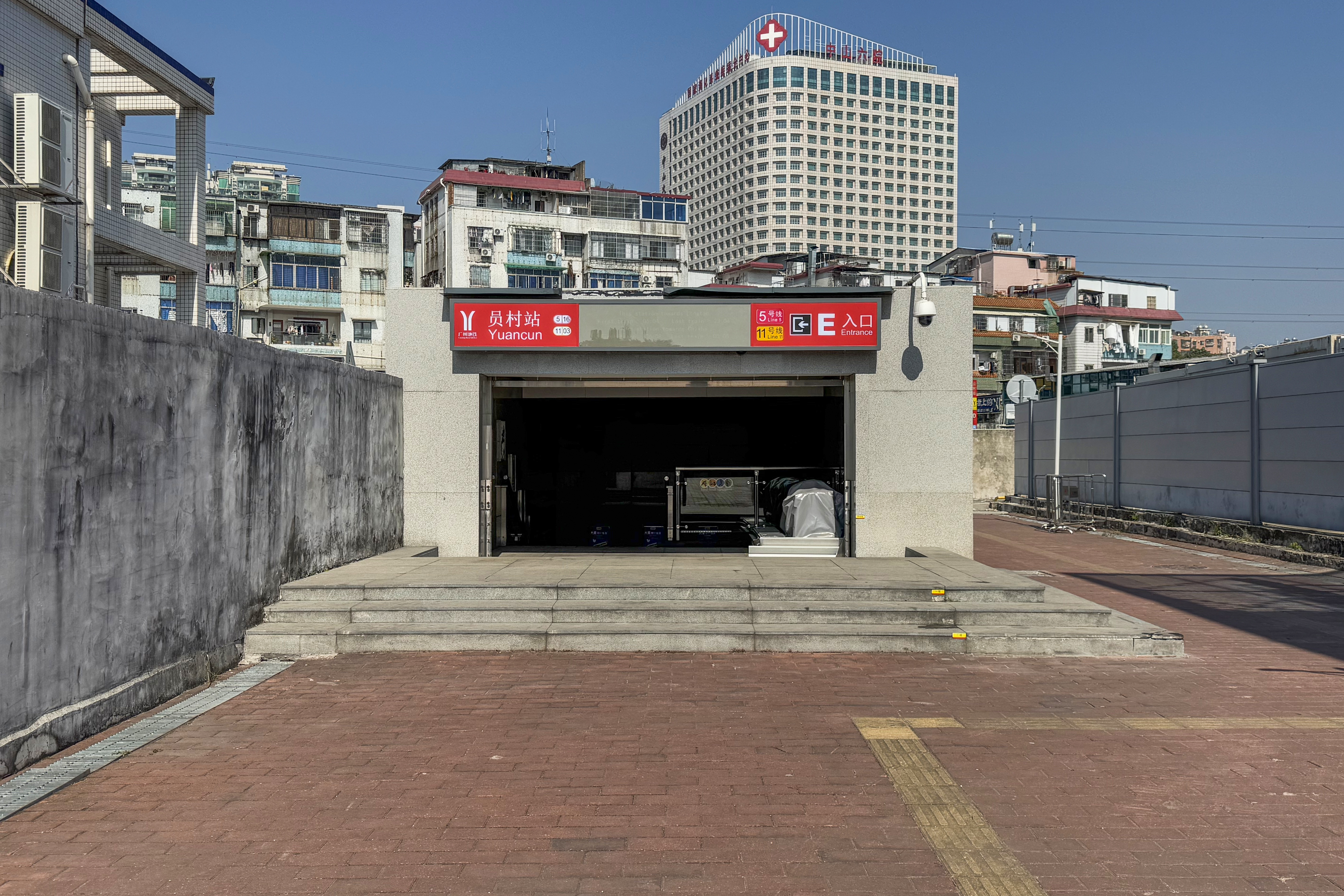
Entrance E

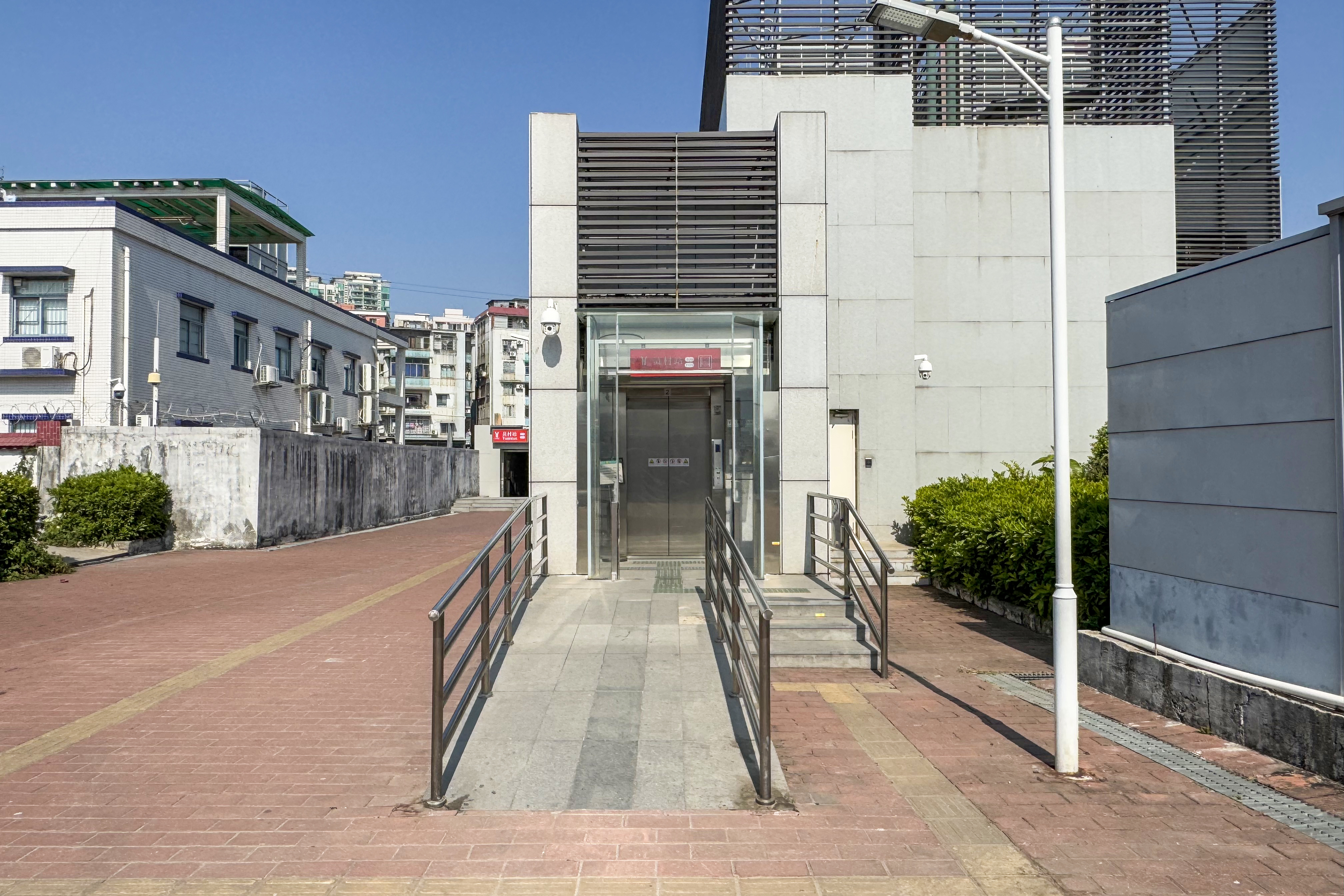
Elevator of Entrance E

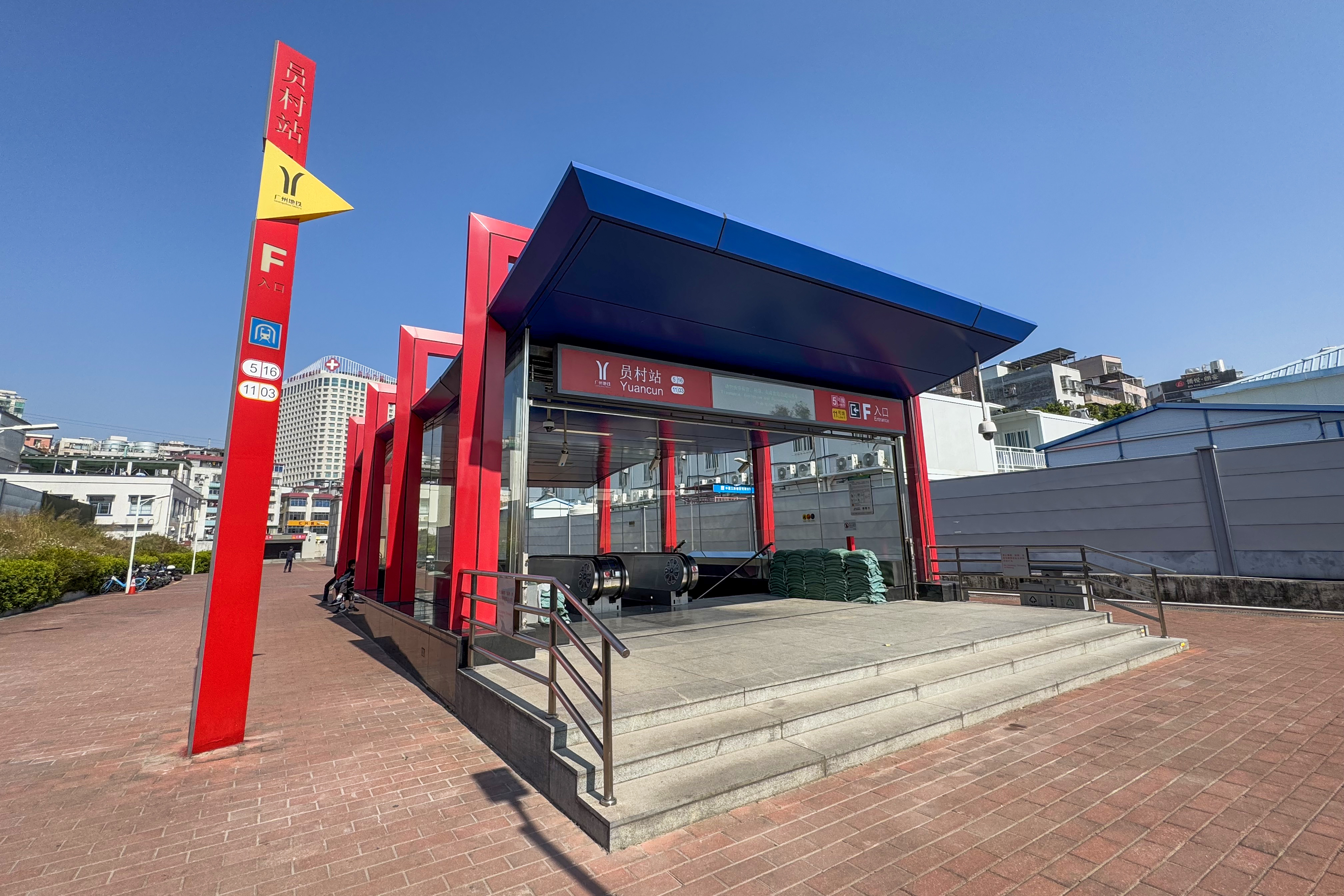
Entrance F

== Gallery ==
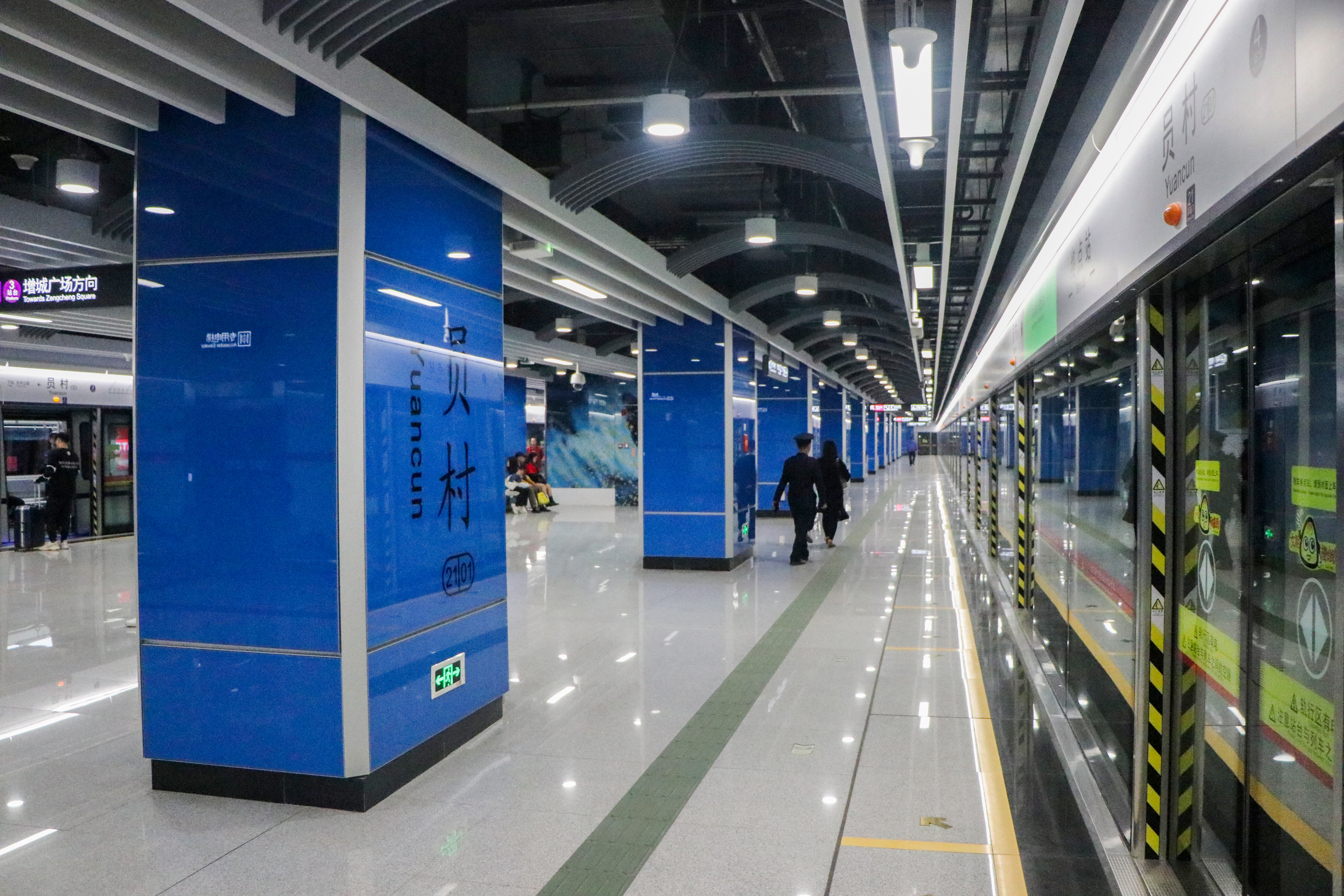
Line 21 platform (prior to renovation)

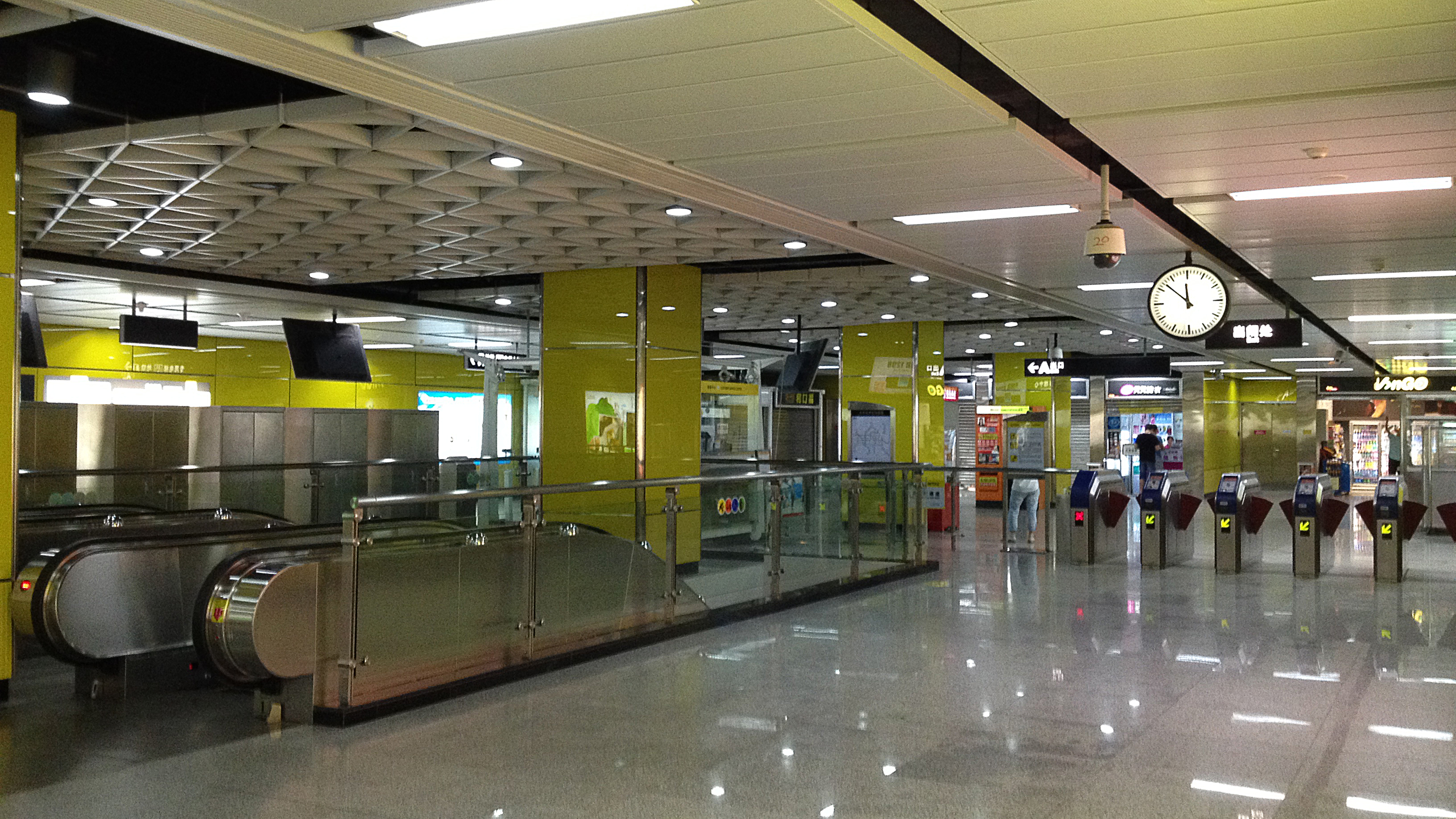
Line 5 Concourse

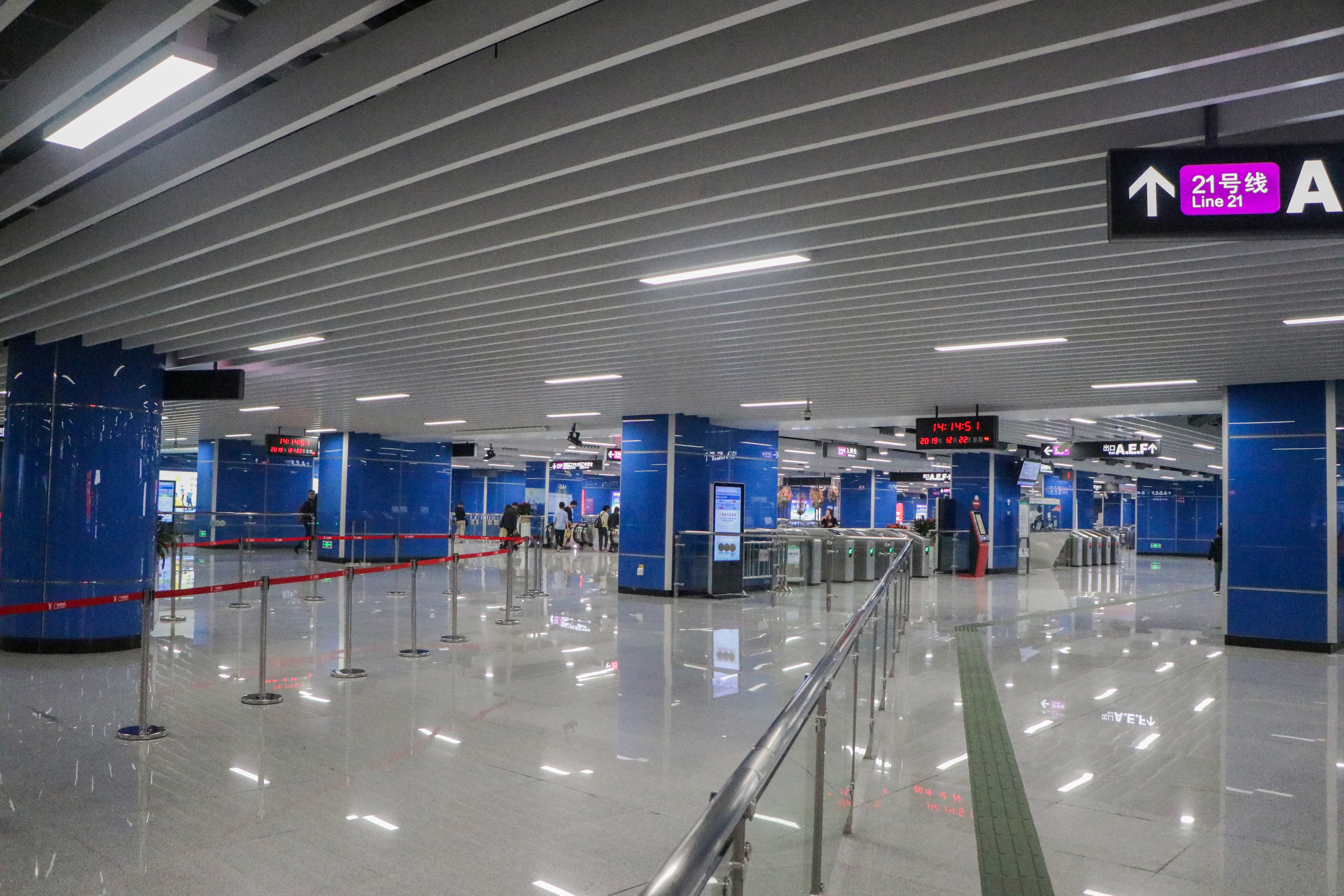
Line 21 Upper Concourse (prior to renovation)

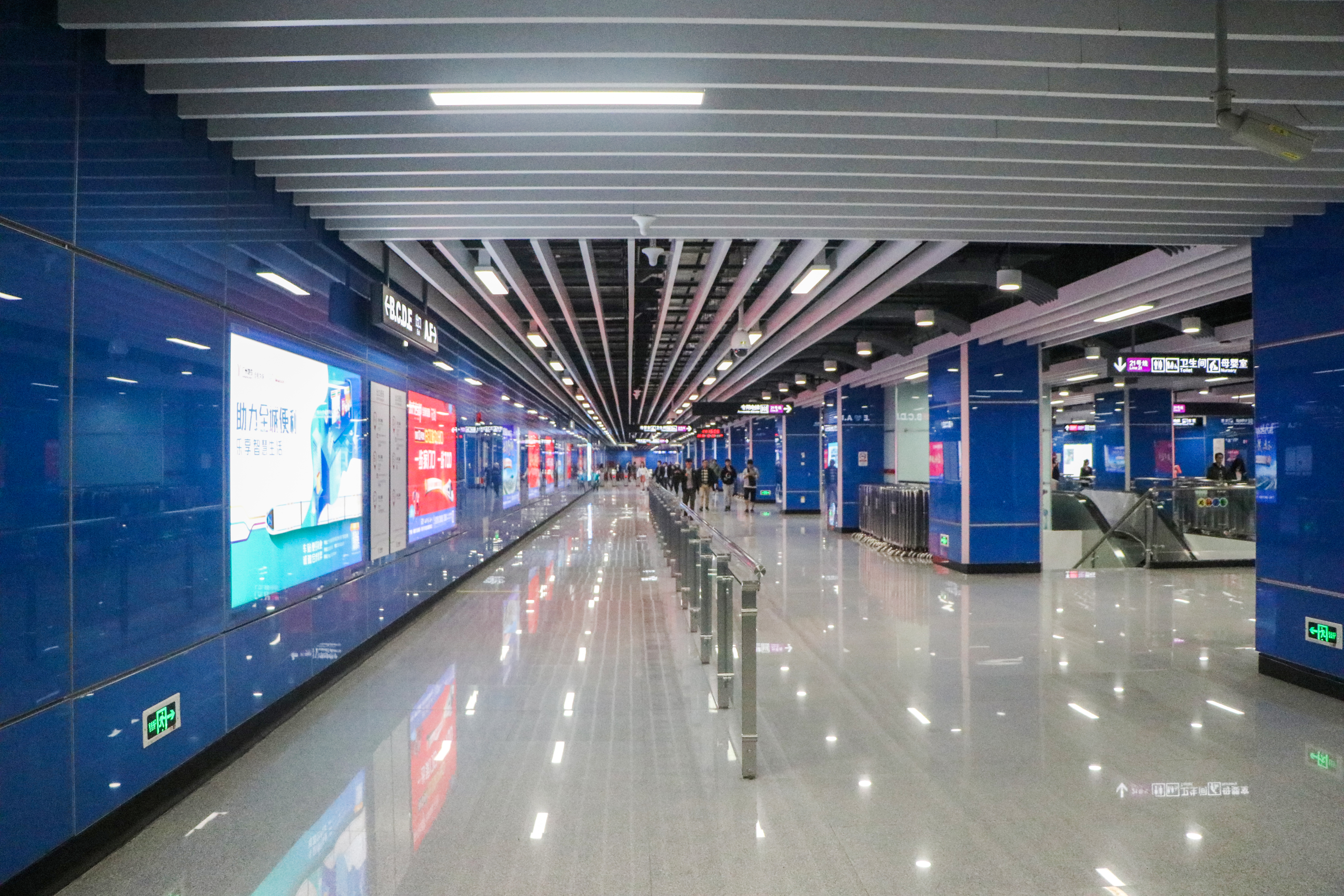
Line 21 Lower Concourse (prior to renovation)

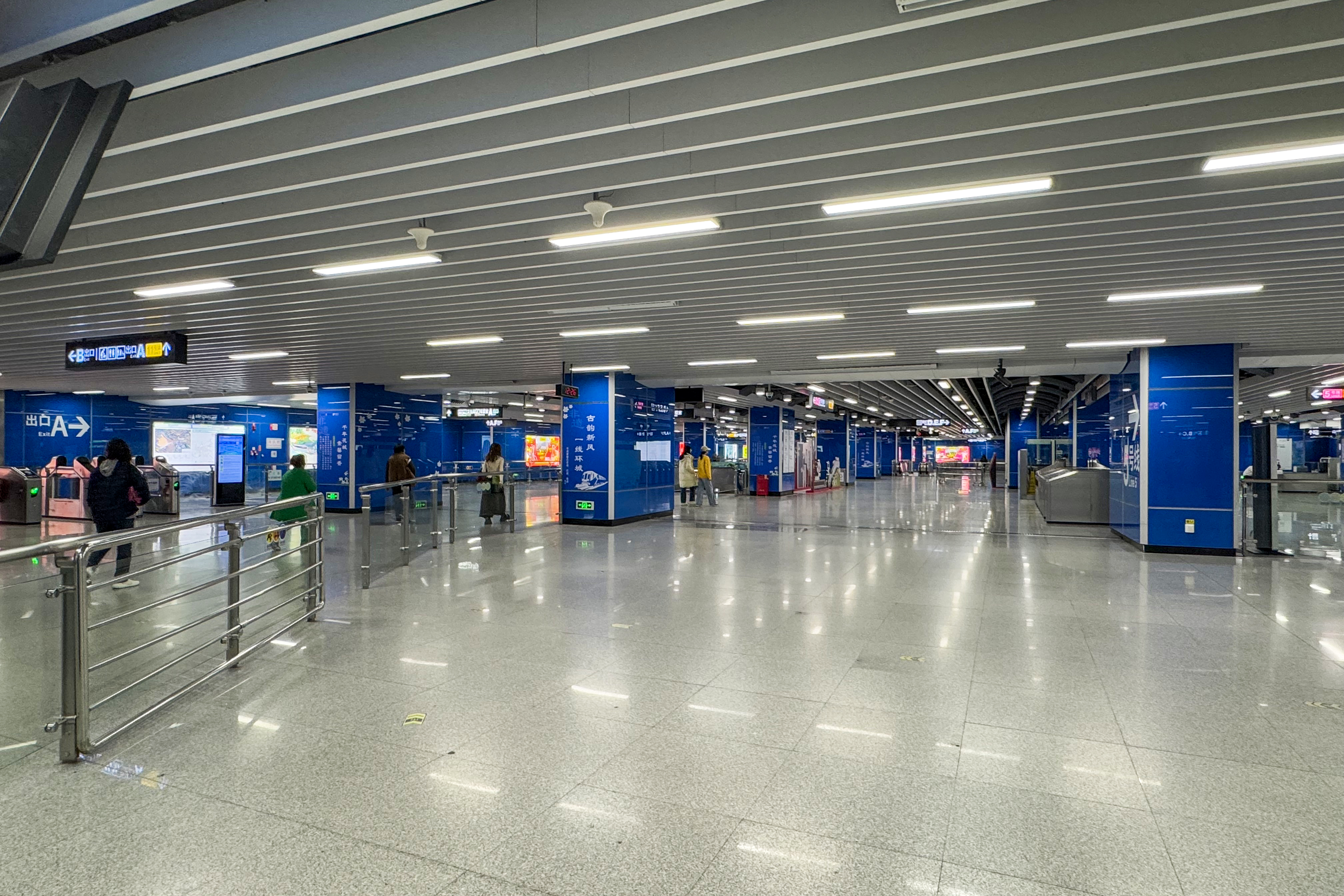
Line 11 Upper Concourse (post renovation)

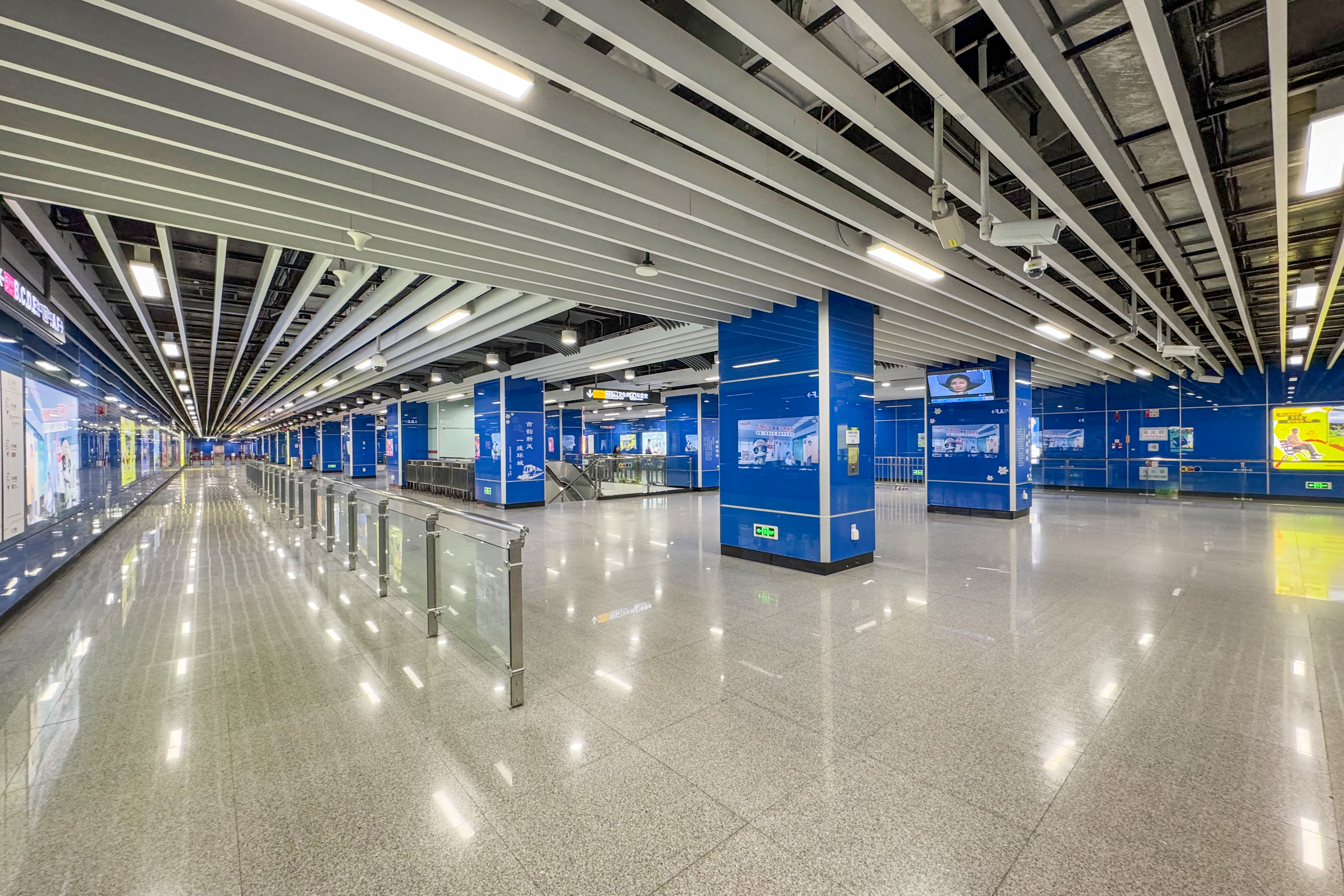
Line 11 Lower Concourse (post renovation)

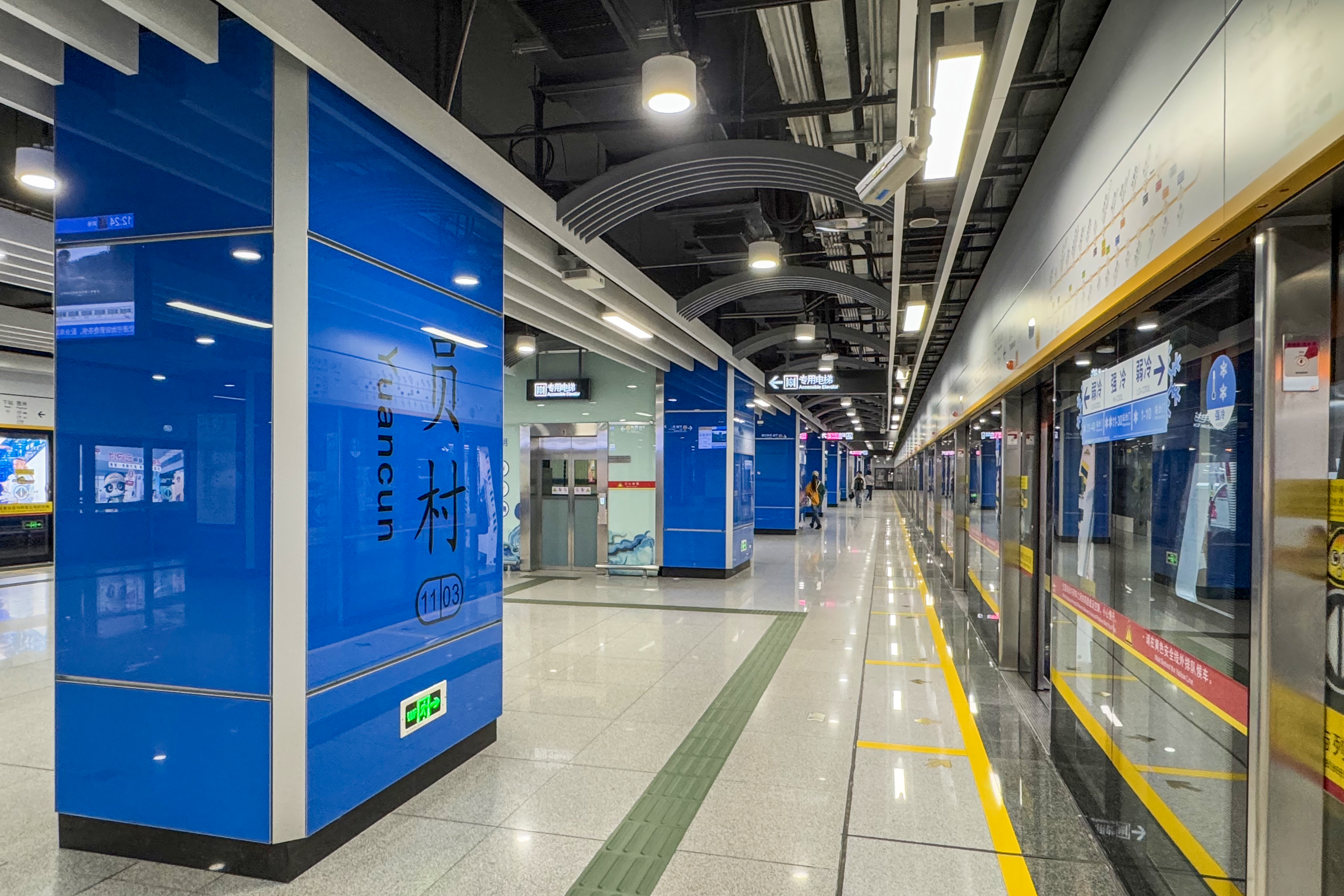
Line 11 Outer Circle platform (post renovation)

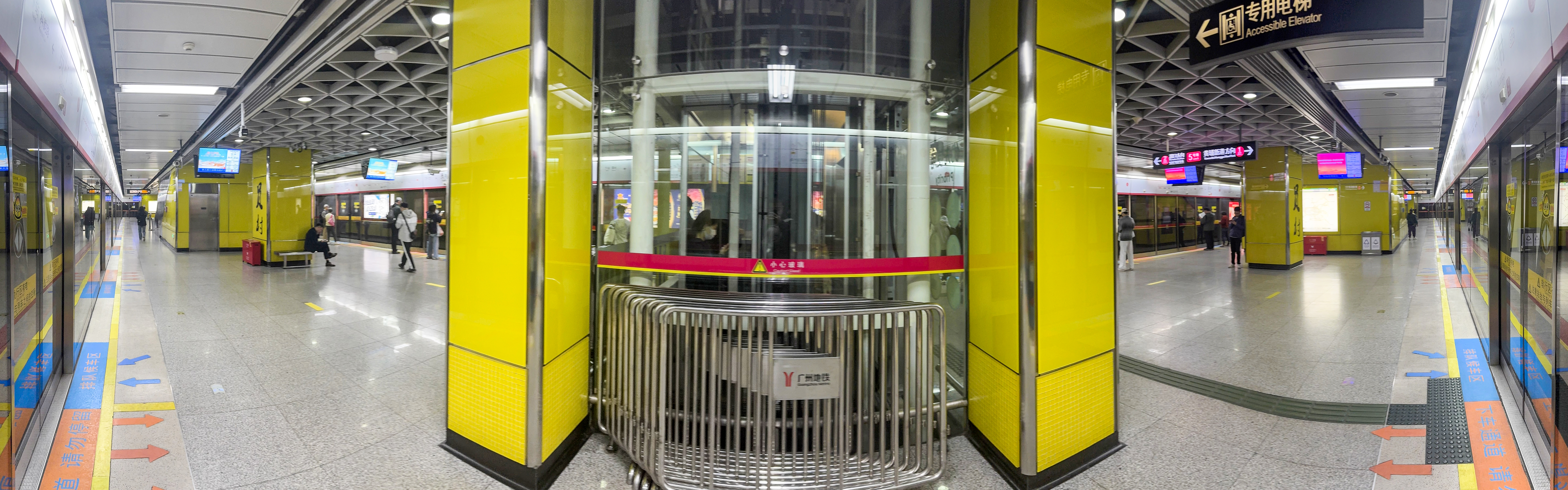
Line 5 platform panorama

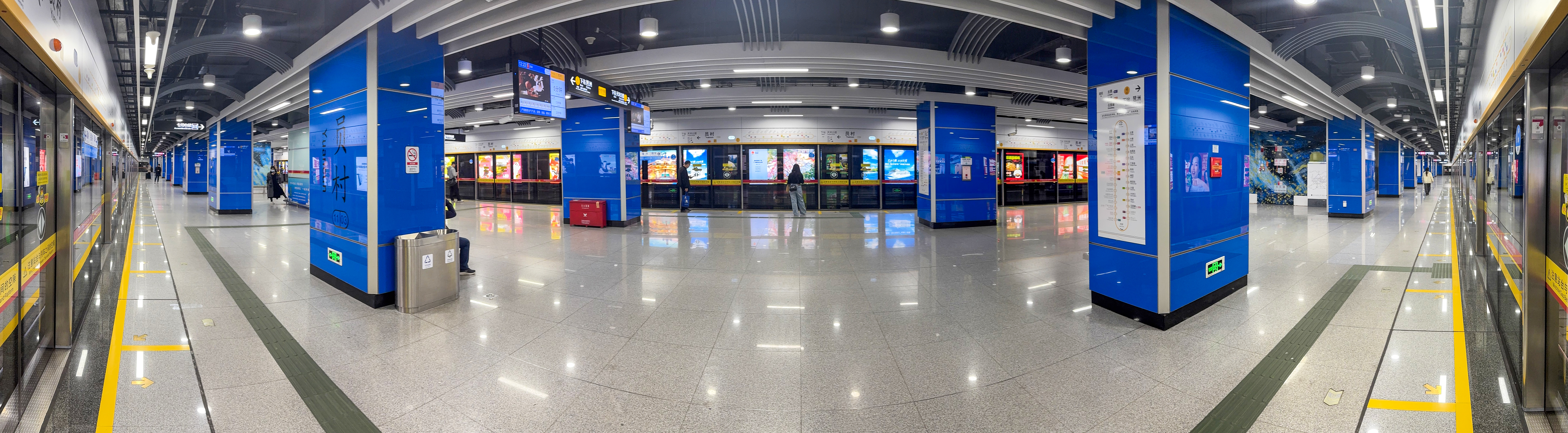
Line 11 platform panorama (post renovation)

== History ==
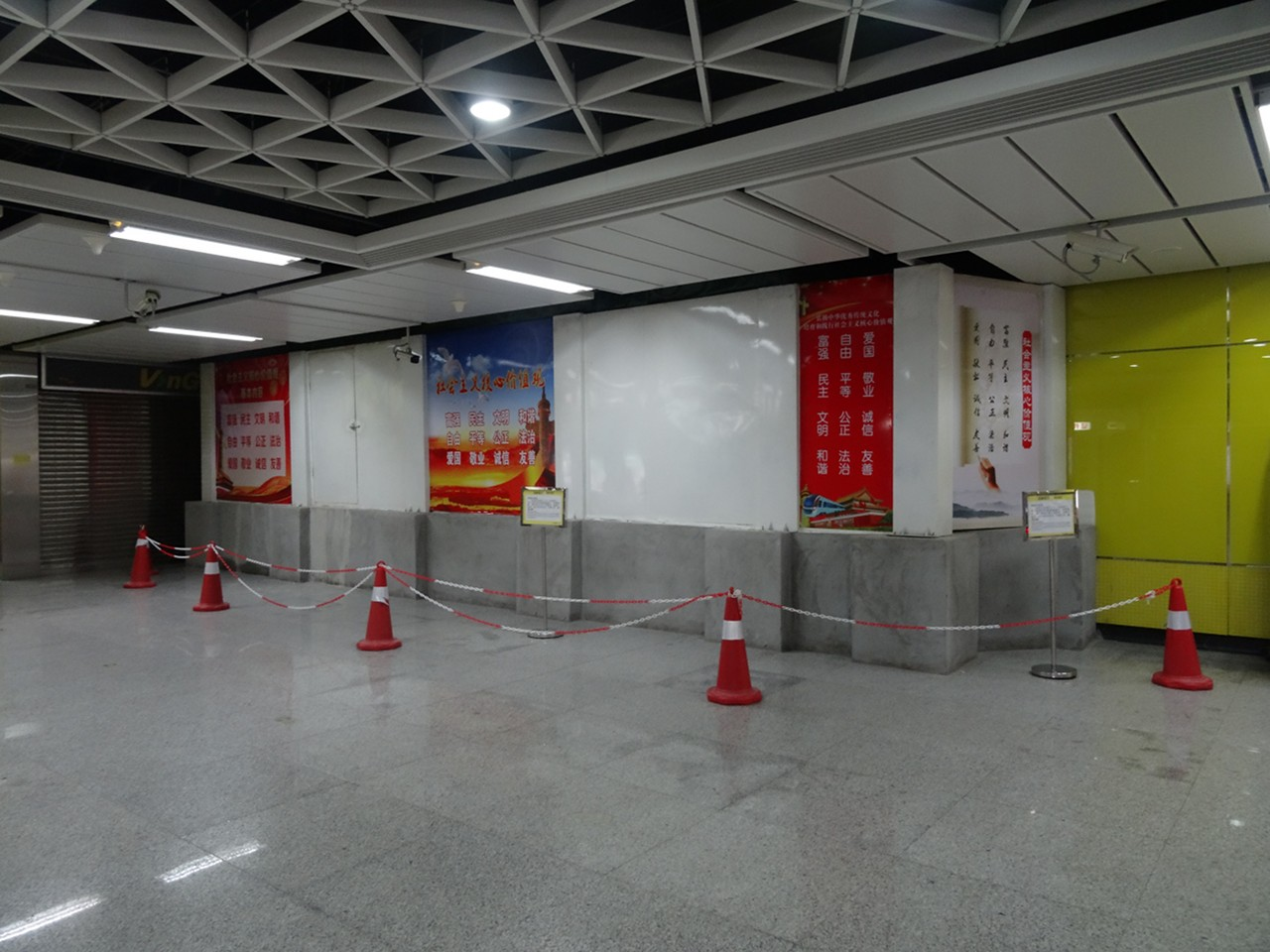
Line 21 is undergoing construction behind the enclosed area on the side of the Line 5 concourse

=== Planning ===
Yuancun Station first appeared in 1997 in the "Guangzhou City Expressway, Traffic Line Planning Study (Final Report)", and the station was located on Line 3 at that time, in which the location was essentially the same as the current one. Later, in the 2003 plan, the original Line 3 was renamed Line 5, and the station was still placed and set for construction. Later, in the 2008 proposal, Line 8, which was planned as a circular line at that time, also passed through this station and became one of the interchange stations with Line 5. Later, in the 2010 plan, the ring line was changed to a completely new project, and the number was adjusted to Line 11. The station thus became an interchange between Lines 5 and 11.

In the further design of Line 21, it was considered that by the time that Line 21 opened, Lines 11 and 13 at its intended terminus at Tianhe Park had not yet been completed and opened, making Line 21 a "dead end" when it reached the terminal station. Therefore, Line 21 temporarily borrowed a section of line from Line 11 by running from Tianhe Park Station to this station, so that Line 21 can interchange with Line 5 and provide better access to the line network. On the eve of the completion of Line 11, the section was dismantled from Line 21 and returned to Line 11 for operation.

=== Construction ===
On 20 December 2013, the construction of the Line 21 station began, which was the first station of Line 21 to start construction. In response to the construction of the Line 21 station, the original paid area of the Line 5 concourse was changed from the original north side to the south side, the shops were demolished, and the police station was relocated. In July 2018, the main structure of the station of Line 21 was topped out. On 6 December 2018, in order to cooperate with the construction of Line 21, Exit A, which was originally located near Exit D, was closed.

On 20 December 2019, the Line 21 station was opened with the opening of the remaining section of Line 21, and the station code was set as 2101 at the time. Exit A, which was closed earlier, had been relocated to the east side of Yuancun 2nd Cross Road near Shidong Primary School and reopened on the same day.

During the construction of the Line 21 station, a platform that can accommodate 8-car A-type cars (the model used by Line 11) was directly built at the time of construction. Since Line 21 itself uses 6-car group B type cars, the platform screen door is installed according to the 6B-type train, and the extra length is directly closed by the glass plate false wall. During the dismantling and transformation project, the original 6B-type screen door and glass plate false wall of the platform were dismantled, and the screen door suitable for the 8A-type was installed at the same time. Moreover, the contact network required for Line 11 has also been installed in advance by Line 21, the switchback line and the section from this station to Tianhe Park Station, and the third track of the section will be removed and the signaling system used by Line 11 will be replaced at the same time. With the imminent opening of Line 11, on 2 October 2024, the dismantling project of Line 21 will be initiated, and the station body part of Line 21 (platforms 3-4, concourse, Exits A, E, and F) will be temporarily closed until after the opening of Line 11. After this part of the station was transferred to Line 11, the existing storage line will also be used to store the spare trains of Line 11. At the end of the same month, the station renovation project was completed and the "three rights" transfer was completed. On 28 December 2024, the original station body of Line 21 was handed over and resumed with the opening of Line 11.
