= Keyun Lu station (Guangzhou Metro) =

Guangzhou Metro station

Keyun Lu 科韵路
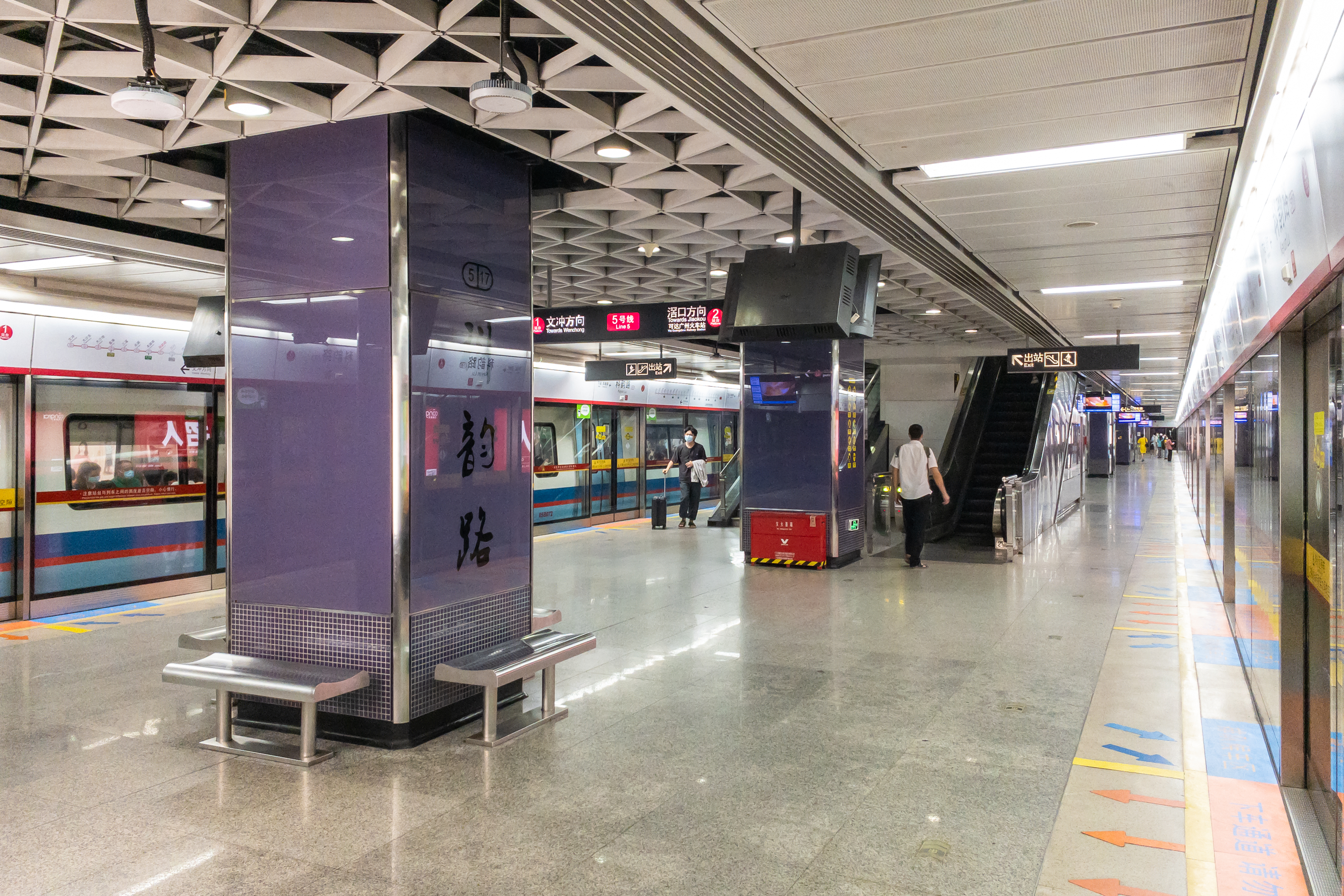
- Platform

Chinese name
- Simplified Chinese: 科韵路站
- Traditional Chinese: 科韻路站
Transcriptions
Standard Mandarin
- Hanyu Pinyin: Kēyùn Lù Zhàn
Yue: Cantonese
- Yale Romanization: Fōwáhn Louh Jaahm
- Jyutping: Fo^{1}wan^{5} Lou^{6} Zaam^{6}

General information
- Location: Tianhe District, Guangzhou, Guangdong; China
- Coordinates: 23.1194°N 113.3770°E
- Operated by: Guangzhou Metro Co. Ltd.
- Line: Line 5
- Platforms: 2 (1 island platform)
- Tracks: 2
- Connections: Keyunlu

Construction
- Structure type: Underground
- Accessible: Yes

Other information
- Station code: 517

History
- Opened: 28 December 2009; 16 years ago

Services
Preceding station	Guangzhou Metro	Following station
Yuancun towards Jiaokou	Line 5	Chebeinan towards Huangpu New Port
Transfer at Keyunlu
Preceding station	Pearl River Delta Metropolitan Region Intercity Railway	Following station
Cencun towards Huadu	Guangzhou East Ring intercity railway transfer at Keyunlu	Pazhou towards Panyu
Location

Keyun Lu Station (simplified Chinese: 科韵路站; traditional Chinese: 科韻路站; Cantonese Yale: Fōwáhn Louh Jaahm; lit. 'Keyun Road Station') is a station on Line 5 of the Guangzhou Metro. It is located at the under the junction of Huangpu Avenue Middle (黄埔大道中) and Keyun Road (科韵路) in the Tianhe District, near Tianhe Science and Technology Park (天河科技园). It opened on 28 December 2009. The station connects to the Guangzhou-Foshan Circular Intercity Railway.
