= Chebeinan station =

Guangzhou Metro interchange station

Chebeinan 车陂南
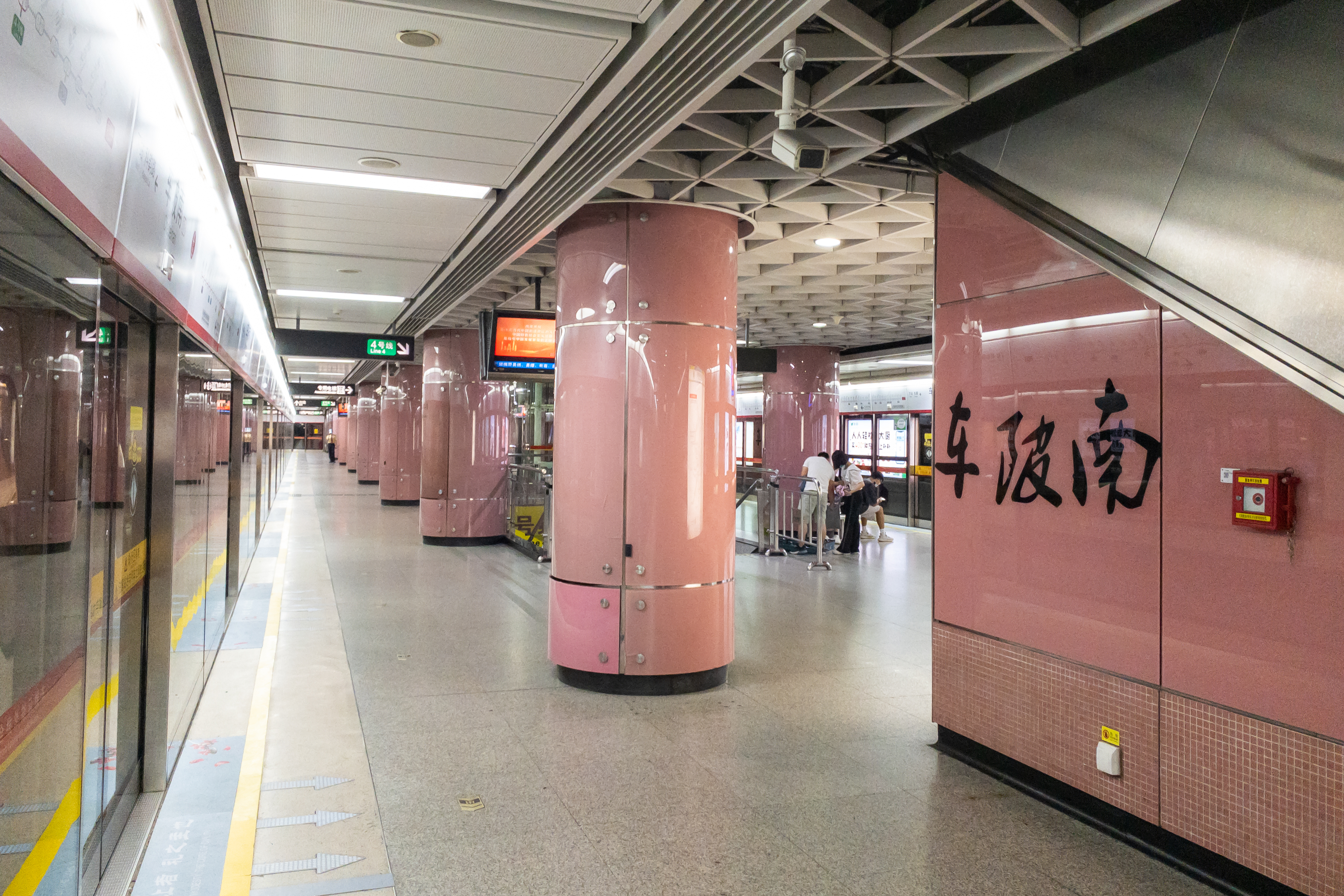
- Line 5 platform

Chinese name
- Simplified Chinese: 车陂南站
- Traditional Chinese: 車陂南站
Transcriptions
Standard Mandarin
- Hanyu Pinyin: Chēbēi Nán Zhàn
Yue: Cantonese
- Yale Romanization: Chēbēi Nàahm Jaahm
- Jyutping: Ce^{1}bei^{1} Naam^{4} Zaam^{6}
- Hong Kong Romanization: Che Pei South station

General information
- Location: Huangpu Avenue East (黄埔大道东) and Chebei Road (车陂路); Tianhe District, Guangzhou, Guangdong; China
- Coordinates: 23°06′57″N 113°23′22″E
- Operated by: Guangzhou Metro Co. Ltd.
- Lines: Line 4; Line 5
- Platforms: 4 (2 island platforms)
- Tracks: 4

Construction
- Structure type: Underground
- Accessible: Yes

Other information
- Station code: 422 518

History
- Opened: 28 December 2009; 16 years ago

Services
Preceding station	Guangzhou Metro	Following station
Chebei towards Huangcun	Line 4	Wanshengwei towards Nansha Passenger Port
Keyun Lu towards Jiaokou	Line 5	Dongpu towards Huangpu New Port
Location

Chebeinan Station (simplified Chinese: 车陂南站; traditional Chinese: 車陂南站; Cantonese Yale: Chēbēi Nàahm Jaahm), literally Chebei South Station and formerly Huangzhou Station (黄洲站; Wòhngjāu Jaahm) when planning, is an interchange station between Line 4 and Line 5 of the Guangzhou Metro. It is located at the underground of the junction of Chebei Road and Huangpu Avenue East in Tianhe District. It opened on 28 December 2009. A public toilet was built outside the station for the convenience of passengers.

== Station layout ==
G	-	Exits A-C
L1; Concourse	Lobby	Ticket Machines, Customer Service, Shops, Police Station, Safety Facilities
L2; Platforms	Platform 4	5 towards Jiaokou (Keyun Lu)
L2; Platforms	Island platform, doors will open on the left
L2; Platforms	Platform 3	5 towards Huangpu New Port (Dongpu)
L3; Platforms	Platform 2	4 towards Nansha Passenger Port (Wanshengwei)
L3; Platforms	Island platform, doors will open on the left
L3; Platforms	Platform 1	4 towards Huangcun (Chebei)

== Exits ==
Exit number	Exit location
Exit A	Huangpu Dadaozhong
Exit B	Huangpu Dadaodong
Exit C	Chebei Lu

== Gallery ==
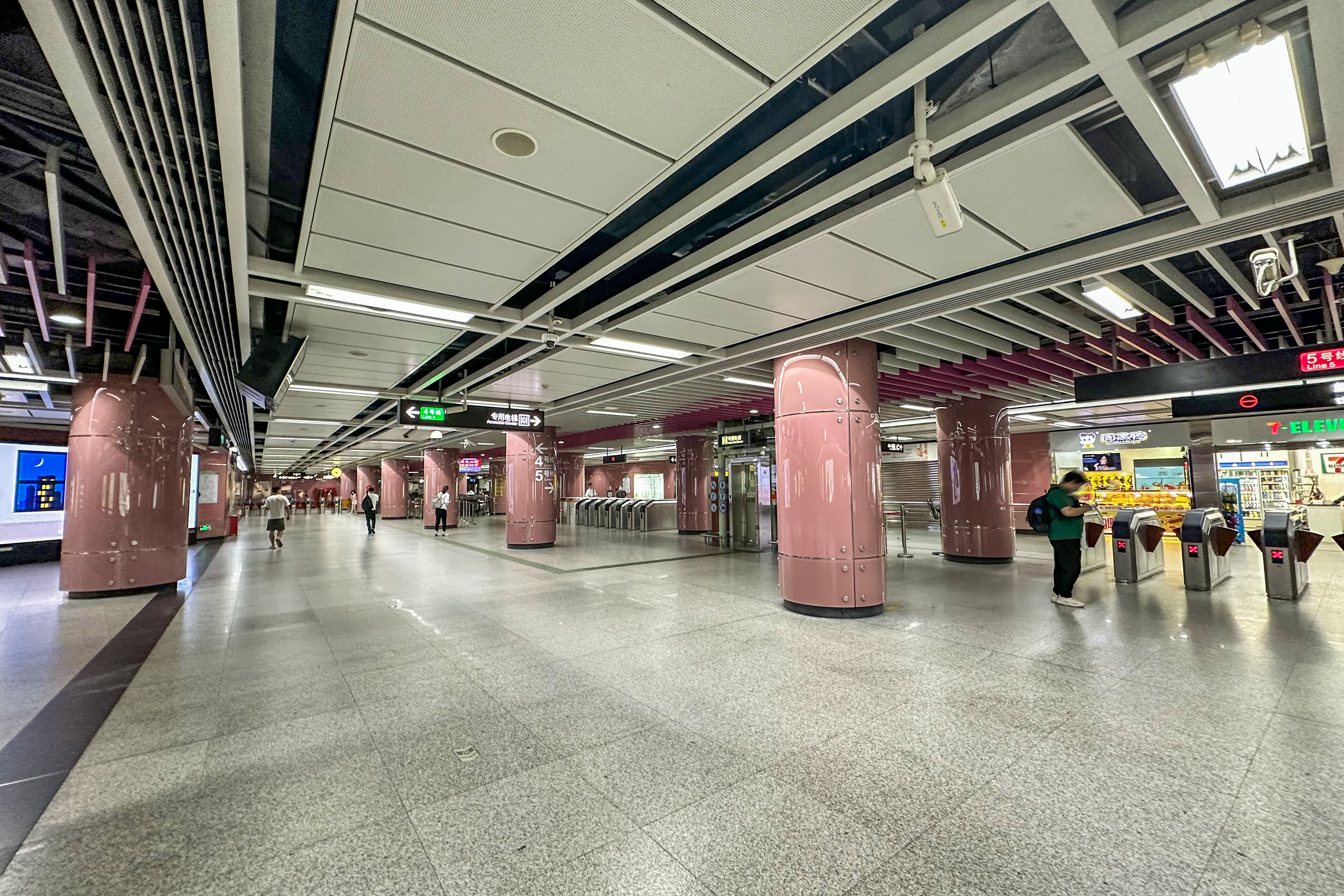
Concourse

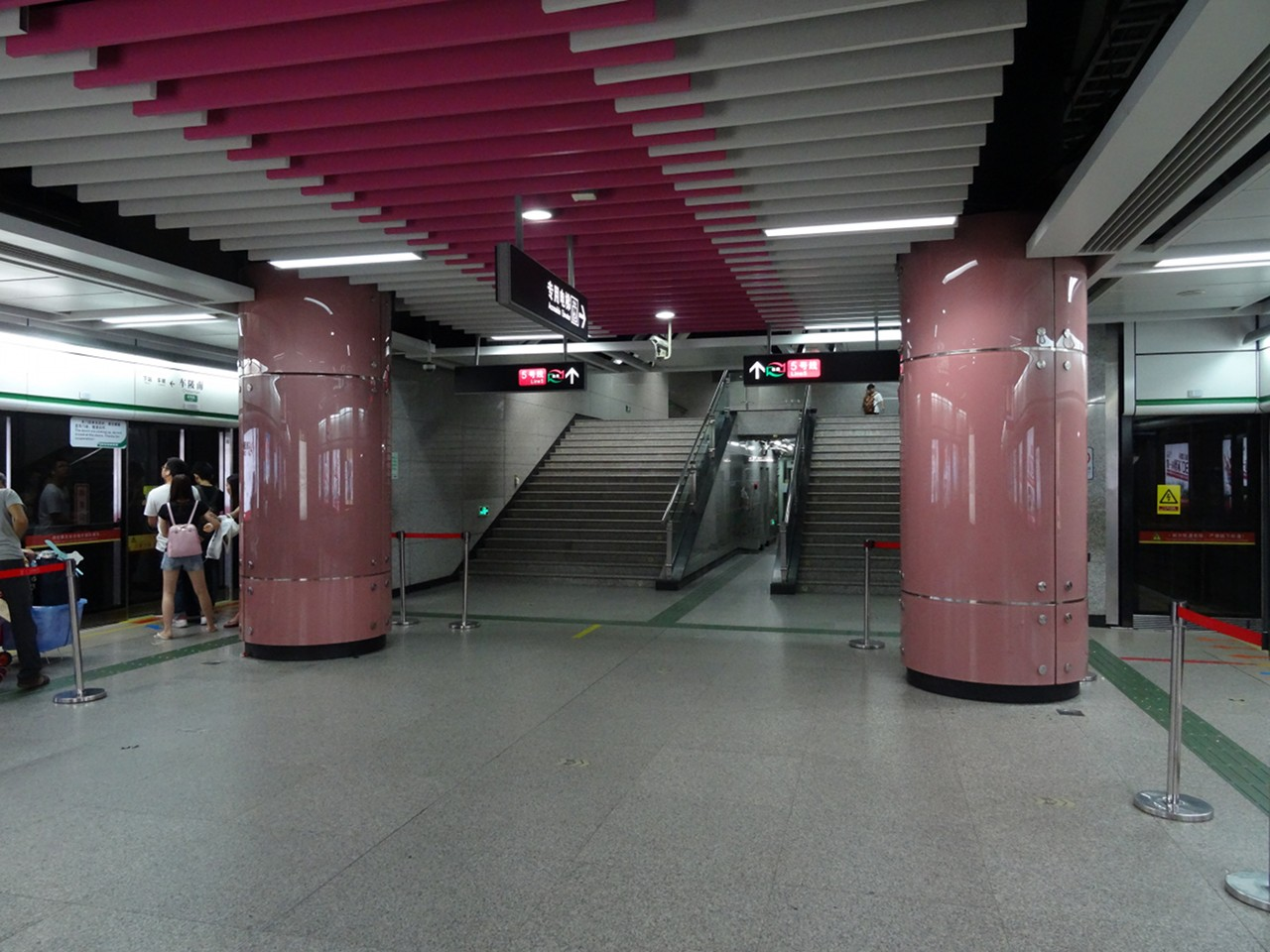
Interchange passageway from the south end of Line 4
