= Xiagang station =

Guangzhou Metro Line 5 station

Xiagang 夏港
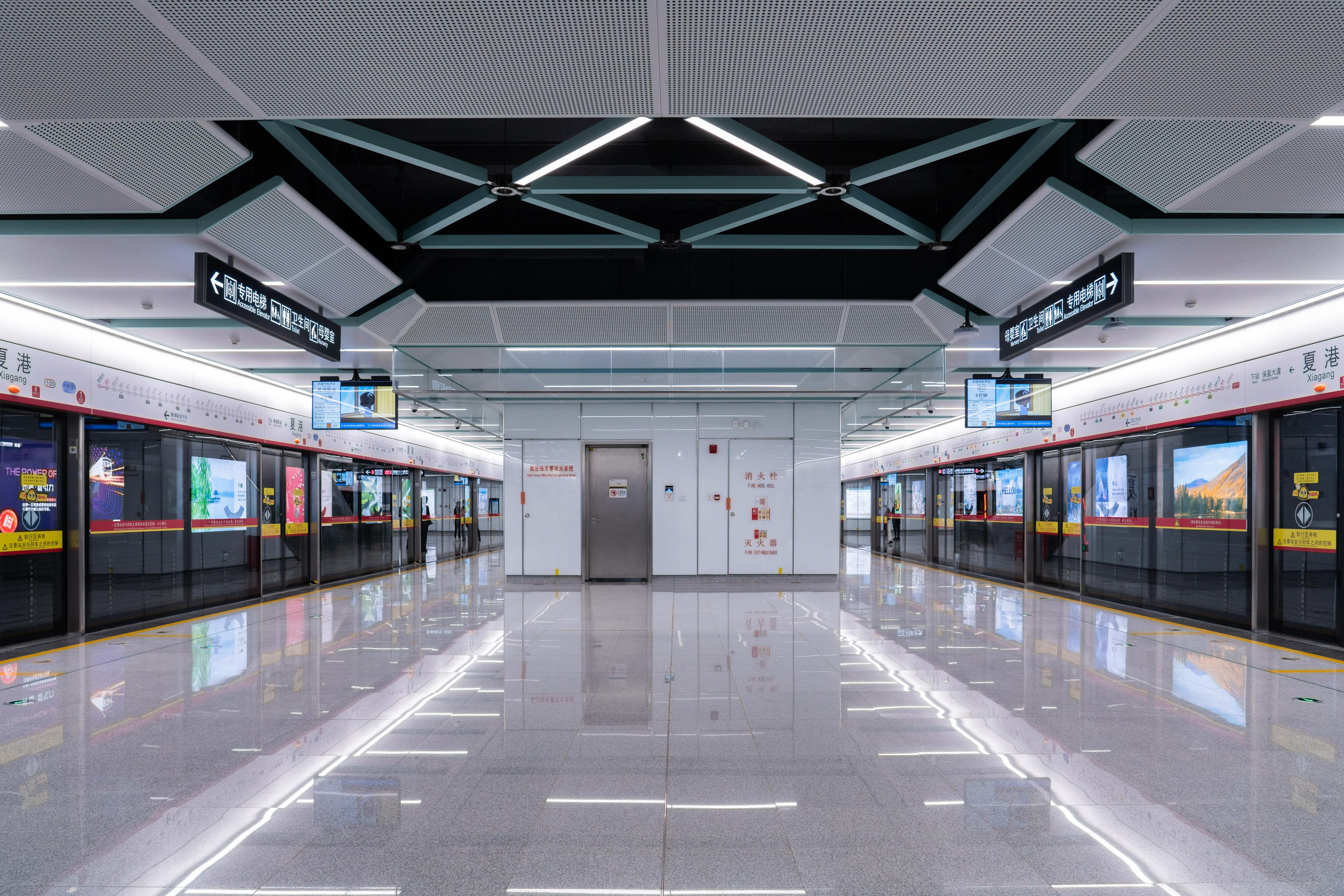
- Platform

Chinese name
- Chinese: 夏港站
Transcriptions
Standard Mandarin
- Hanyu Pinyin: Xiàgǎng Zhàn
Yue: Cantonese
- Yale Romanization: Hahgóng Jaahm
- Jyutping: Haa^{6}gong^{2} Zaam^{6}

General information
- Location: South side of the fork of Kaifa Avenue (开发大道) and Mingzhu Road (明珠路), Huangpu District, Guangzhou, Guangdong; China
- Coordinates: 23°3′58.39″N 113°31′11.71″E
- Operator: Guangzhou Metro Co. Ltd.
- Line: Line 5
- Platforms: 2 (1 island platform)
- Tracks: 2

Construction
- Structure type: Underground
- Accessible: Yes

Other information
- Station code: 529

History
- Opened: 28 December 2023 (2 years ago)
- Former names: Guangzhou Development Zone (广州开发区)

Services
Preceding station	Guangzhou Metro	Following station
Baoying Dadao towards Jiaokou	Line 5	Huangpu New Port Terminus
Location

Xiagang station (Chinese: 夏港站; pinyin: Xiàgǎng Zhàn; Cantonese Yale: Hahgóng Jaahm) is a metro station on Line 5 of the Guangzhou Metro in Guangzhou, China. It is located underground on the south side of the fork of Kaifa Avenue (开发大道) and Mingzhu Road (明珠路) in the Guangzhou Economic and Technological Development Zone in Huangpu District. It opened on 28 December 2023, with the opening of the eastern extension of the line.

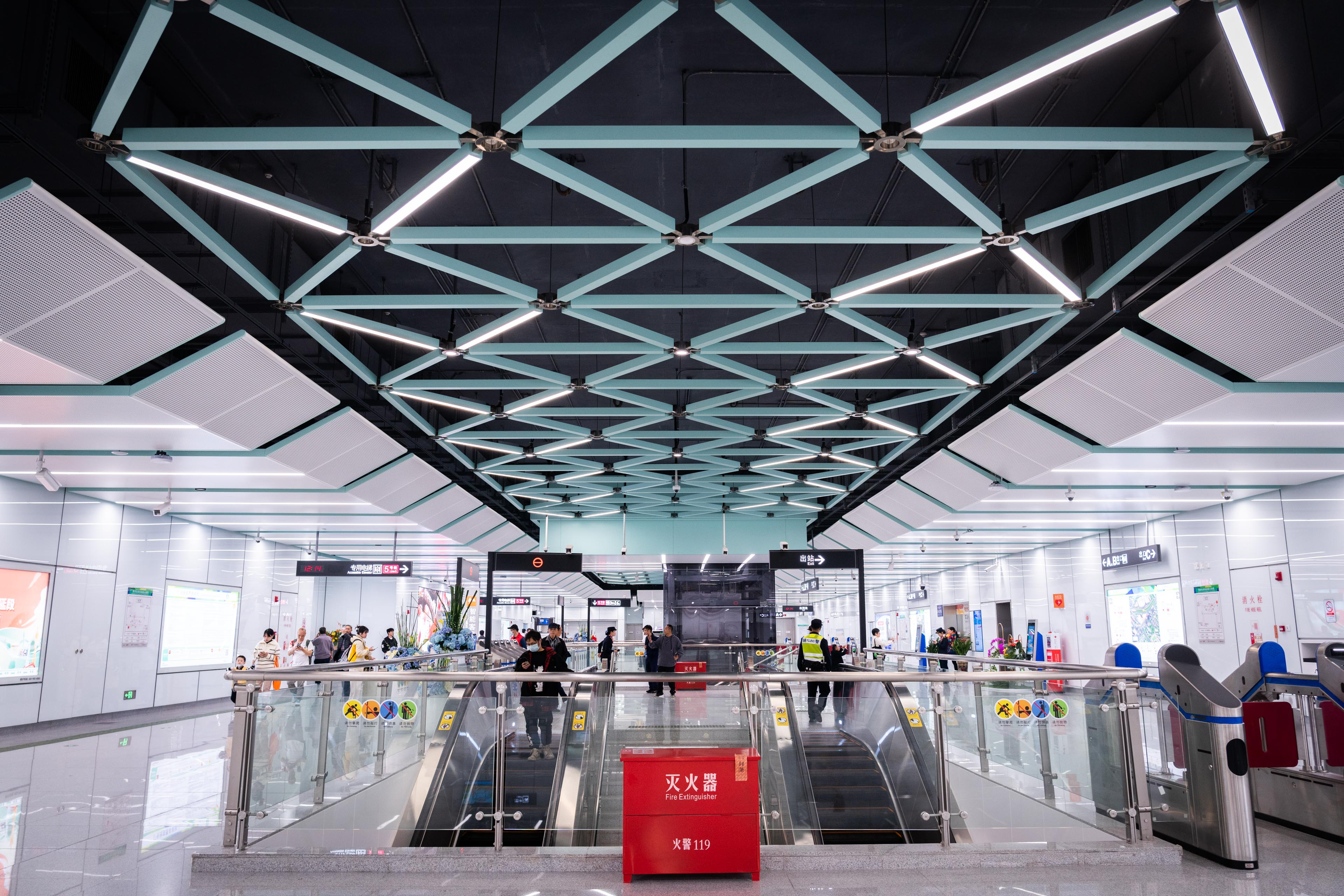
Concourse

== Station layout ==
G	Street level	Exits A, B1, B2, C
L1; Concourse	Lobby	Ticket Machines, Customer Service, Shops, Police Station, Safety Facilities
L2; Platforms	Platform 2	5 towards Jiaokou (Baoying Dadao)
L2; Platforms	Island platform, doors will open on the left (Toilets, Nursery)
L2; Platforms	Platform 1	5 towards Huangpu New Port (terminus)

=== Entrances/exits ===
The station has 4 points of entry/exit. Exit A is equipped with an elevator.

- A: Kaifa Avenue
- B1: Kaifa Avenue
- B2: Kaifa Avenue
- C: Kaifa Avenue
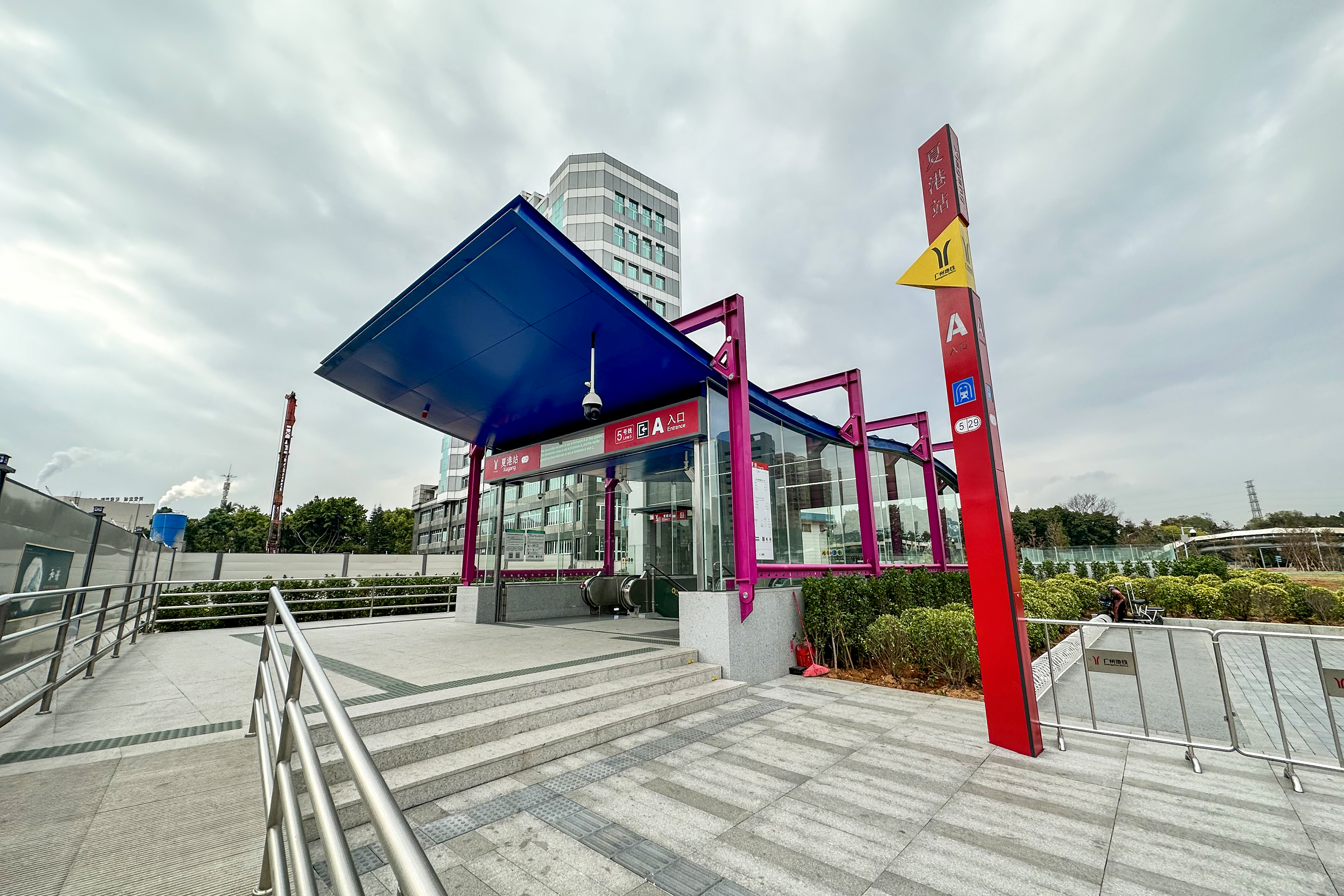
Entrance A

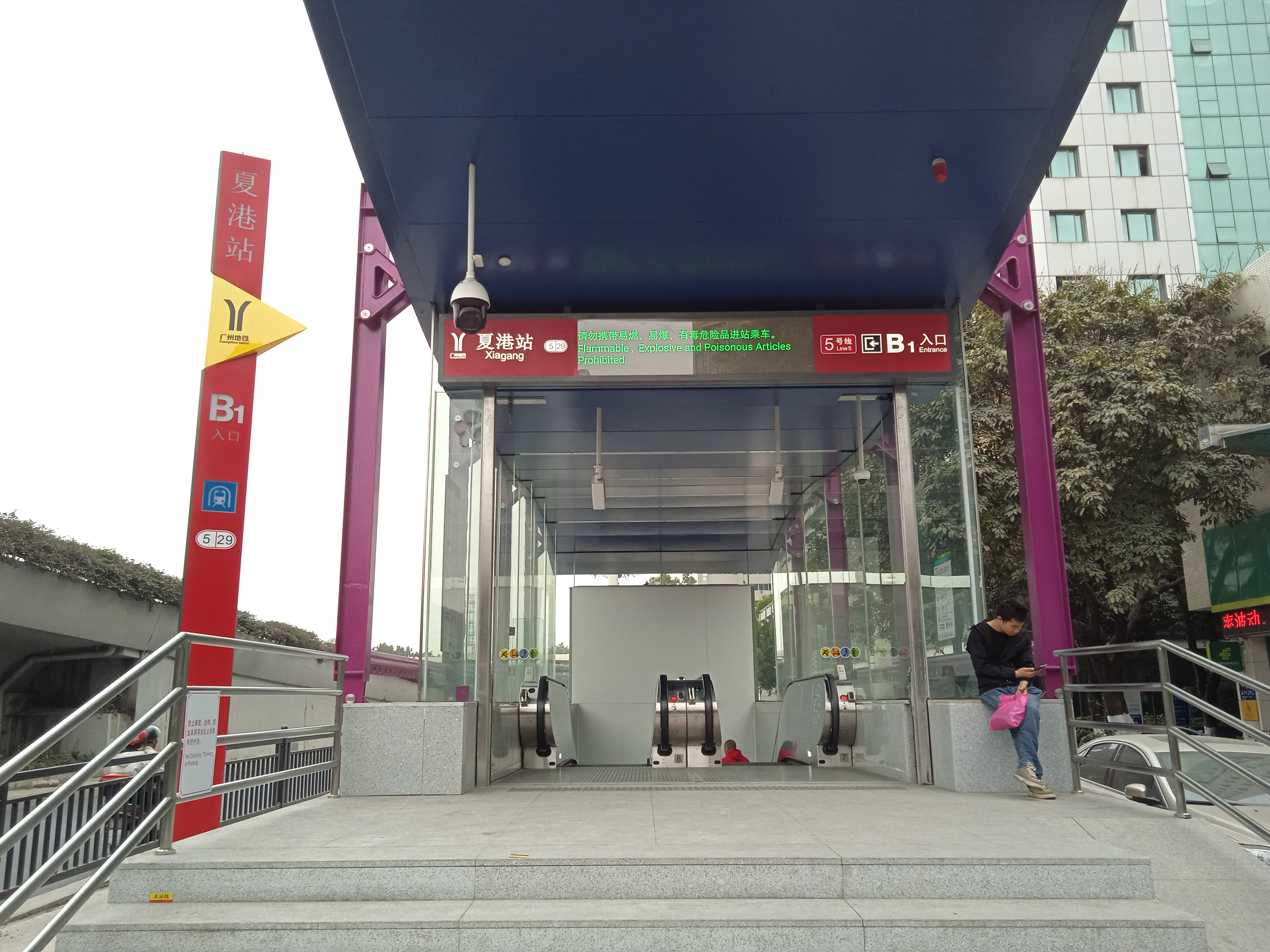
Entrance B1

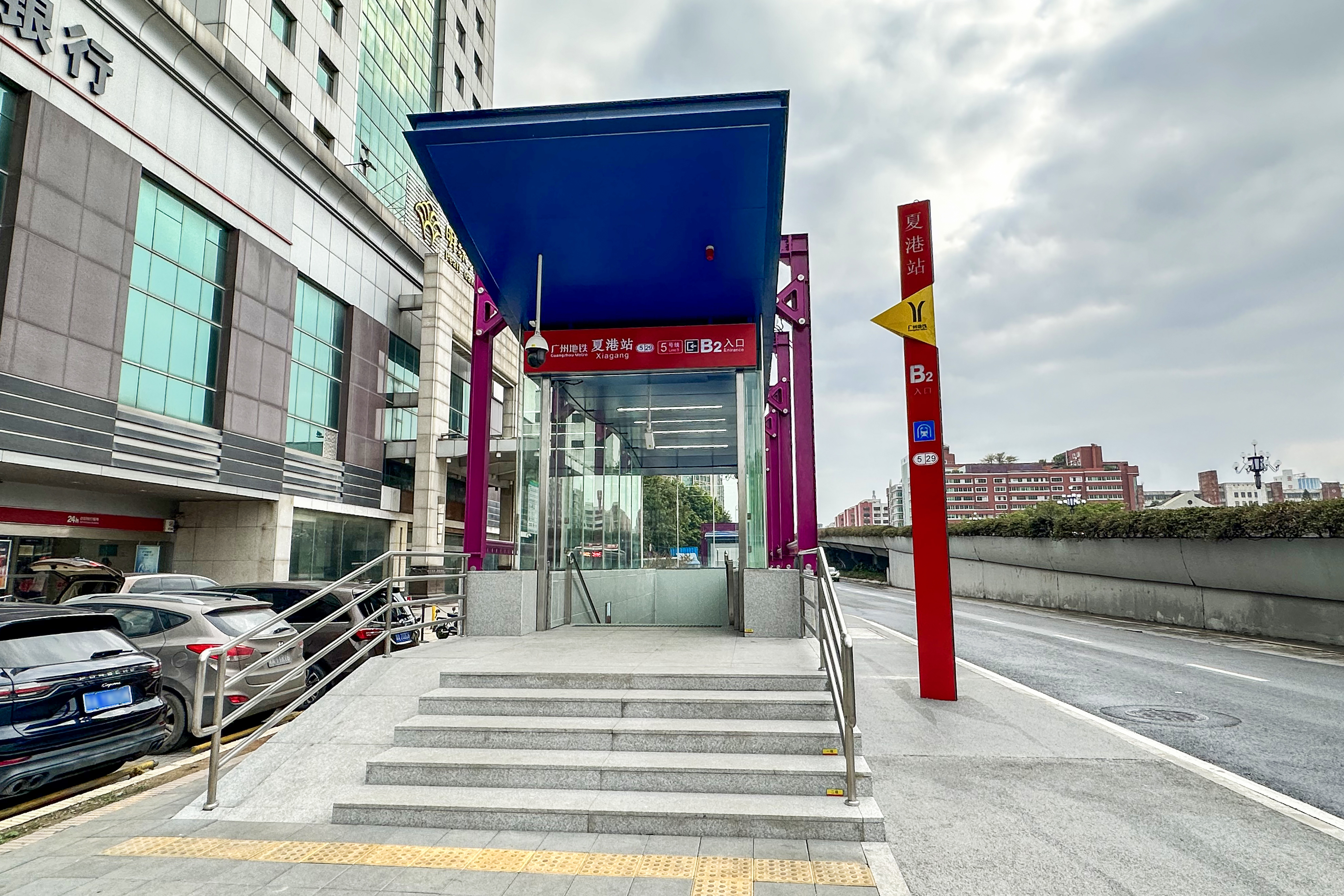
Entrance B2

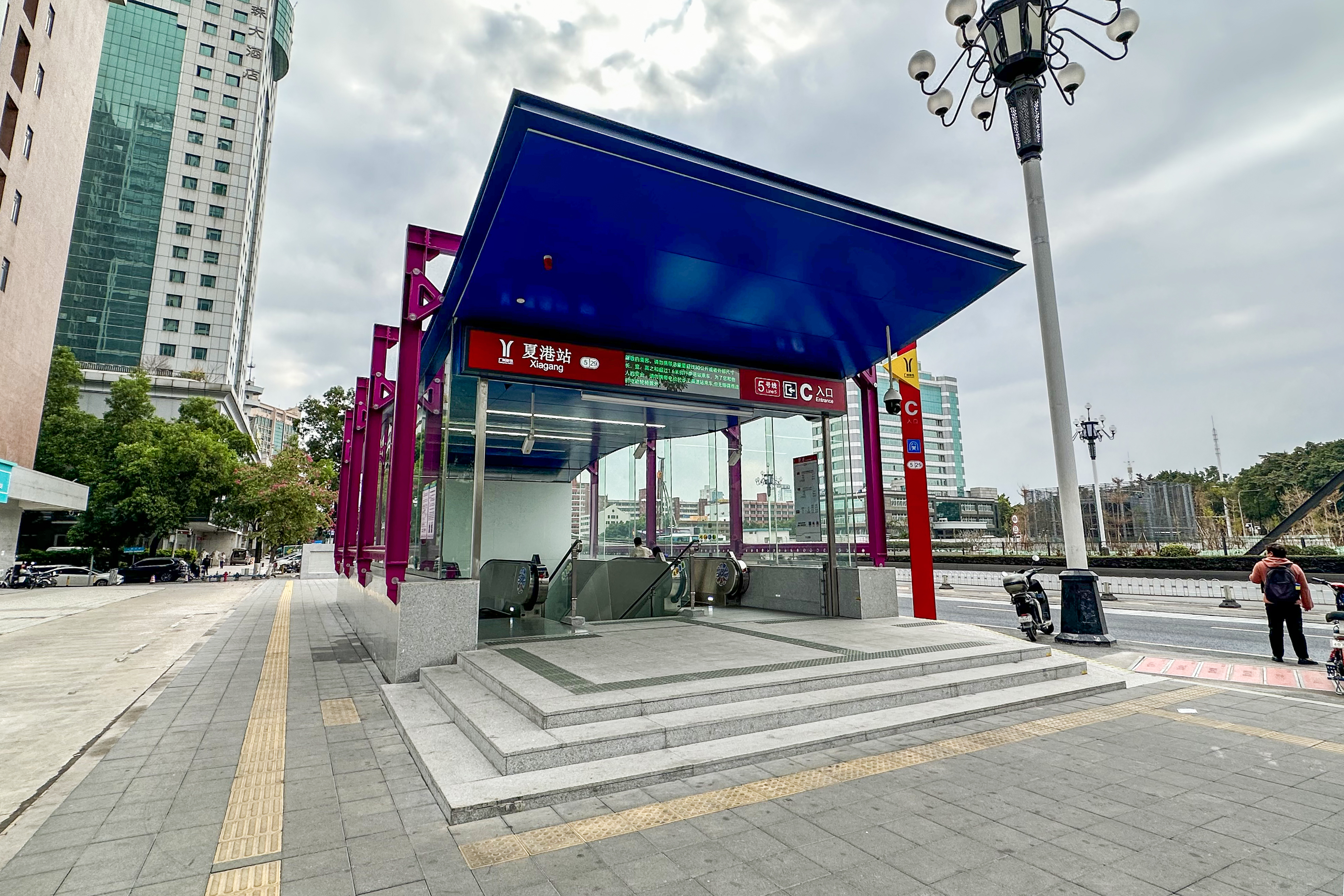
Entrance C

== History ==
As early as 1997, this station appeared as one of the intermediate stations of the branch line of Line 5 in the direction of Guangzhou Development Zone in the "Guangzhou Urban Rapid Transit Line Network Planning Research (Final Report)". Subsequently, this site was still set up in the 2003 plan and in the partial revision plan. The station then became one of the stations in the eastern extension of Line 5, which was officially approved in January 2018 and was built simultaneously with the eastern extension of Line 5.

During the planning phase, this station was called Guangzhou Development Zone station. On 27 February 2023, the Guangzhou Civil Affairs Bureau announced the initial names of stations on the east extension of Line 5, and this station was renamed to Xiagang station.

The station was the first one to be capped on the eastern extension of Line 5, which happened during October 2021. In December the same year, the shield tunnel section from this station to Huangpu New Port became the first tunnel section to be completed on the eastern extension.

The station opened on 28 December 2023 along with the eastern extension of Line 5.
