= Baoying Dadao station =

Guangzhou Metro Line 5 station

Baoying Dadao 保盈大道
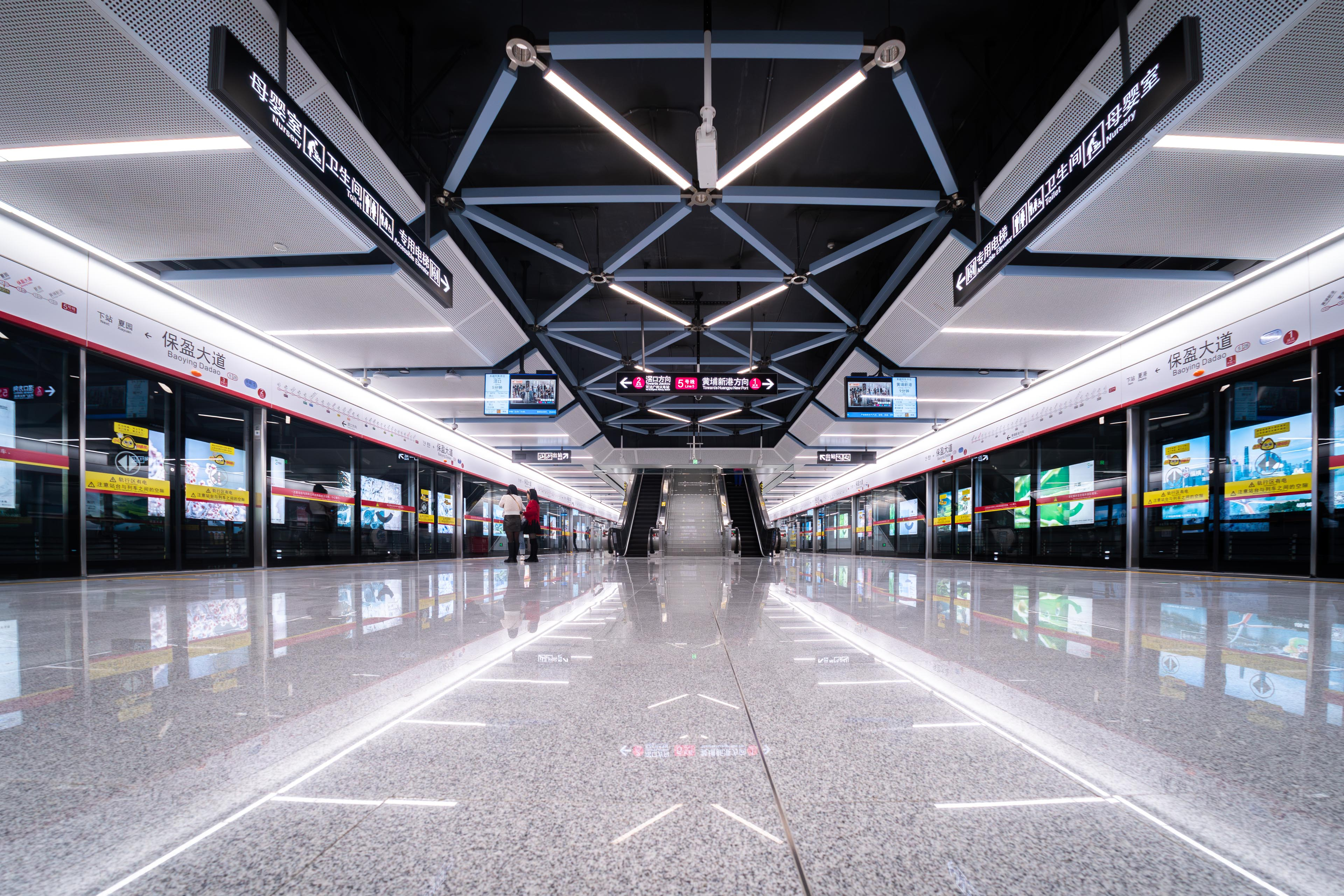
- Platform

Chinese name
- Chinese: 保盈大道站
Transcriptions
Standard Mandarin
- Hanyu Pinyin: Buoying Dàdào Zhàn
Yue: Cantonese
- Yale Romanization: Bouyìhng Daaihdouh Jaahm
- Jyutping: Bou^{2}jing^{4} Daai^{6}dou^{6} Zaam^{6}

General information
- Location: Intersection of Kaifa Avenue (开发大道) and Baoying Avenue (保盈大道), Huangpu District, Guangzhou, Guangdong; China
- Coordinates: 23°4′37.70″N 113°31′14.84″E
- Operator: Guangzhou Metro Co. Ltd.
- Line: Line 5
- Platforms: 2 (1 island platform)
- Tracks: 2

Construction
- Structure type: Underground
- Accessible: Yes

Other information
- Station code: 528

History
- Opened: 28 December 2023 (2 years ago)

Services
Preceding station	Guangzhou Metro	Following station
Xiayuan towards Jiaokou	Line 5	Xiagang towards Huangpu New Port
Location

Baoying Dadao station (Chinese: 保盈大道站; pinyin: Bǎoyíng Dàdào Zhàn; Cantonese Yale: Bouyìhng Daaihdouh Jaahm) is a metro station on Line 5 of the Guangzhou Metro in Guangzhou, China. It is located underground at the intersection of Kaifa Avenue (开发大道) and Baoying Avenue (保盈大道) in Huangpu District. It opened on 28 December 2023, with the opening of the eastern extension of the line.

== Station layout ==
G	Street level	Exits A-C
L1; Concourse	Lobby	Ticket Machines, Customer Service, Shops, Police Station, Safety Facilities
L2; Platforms	Platform 2	5 towards Jiaokou (Xiayuan)
L2; Platforms	Island platform, doors will open on the left (Toilets, Nursery)
L2; Platforms	Platform 1	5 towards Huangpu New Port (Xiagang)

=== Platform ===
The station has an island platform under Baoying Avenue. The toilets and nursery are located at the southern end facing Huangpu New Port. There is also a single turnaround line at the southern end.

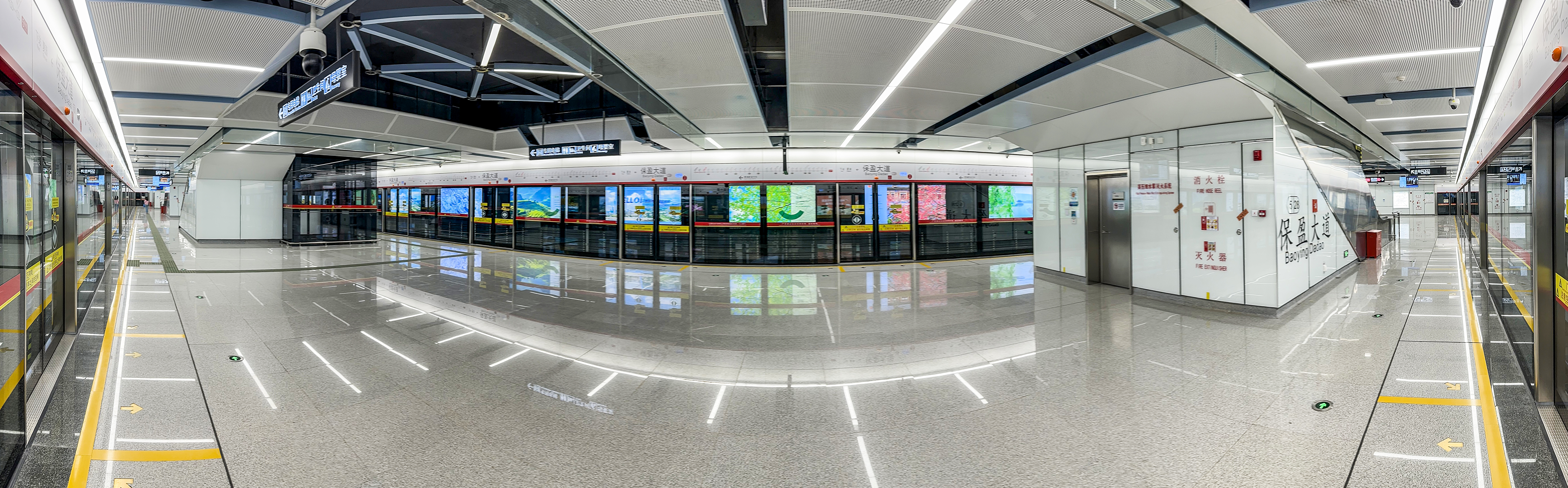
Platform panorama

=== Entrances/exits ===
The station has 3 points of entry/exit. Exit A is equipped with an elevator.

- A: Kaifa Avenue
- B: Kaifa Avenue
- C: Baoying Avenue
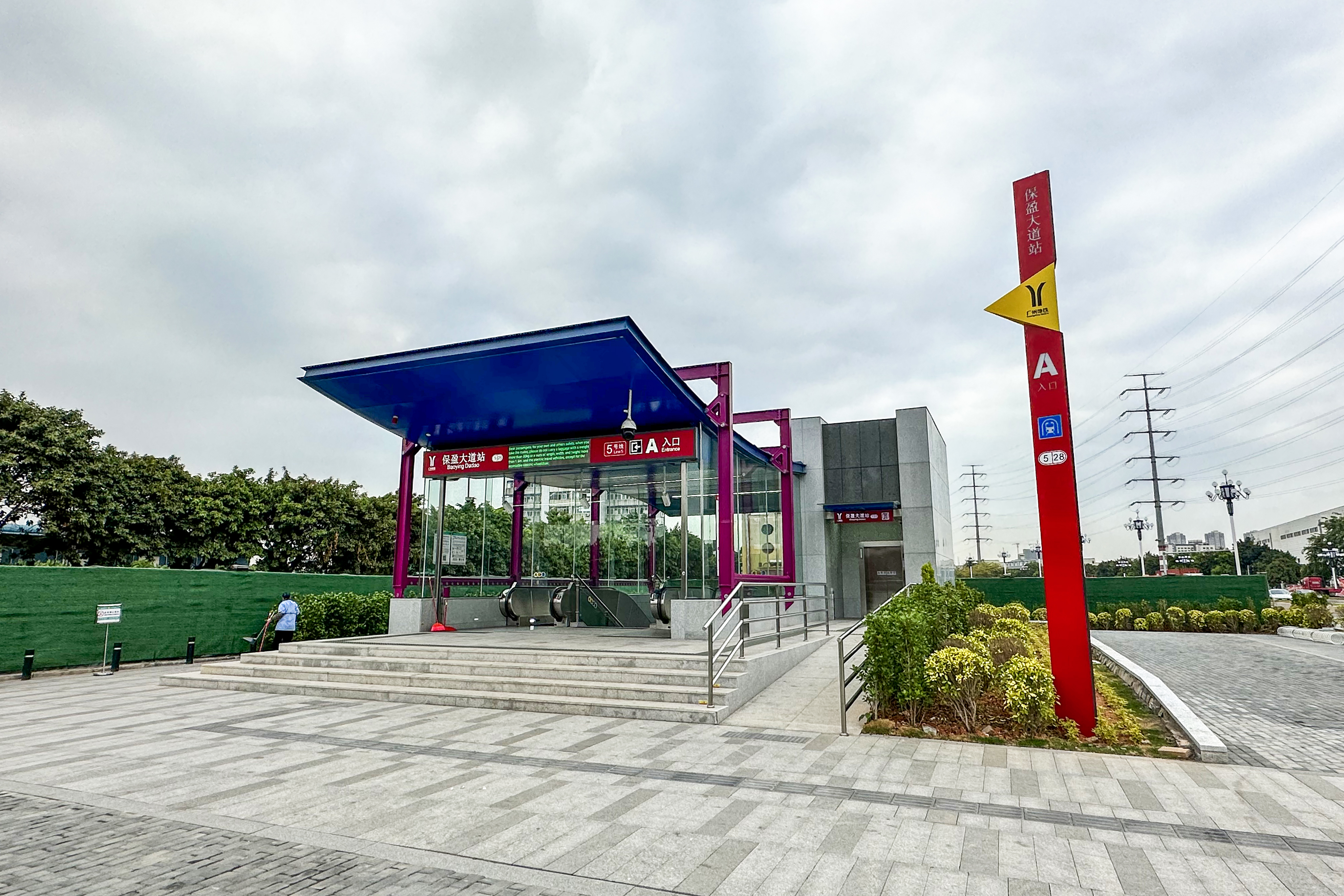
Entrance A

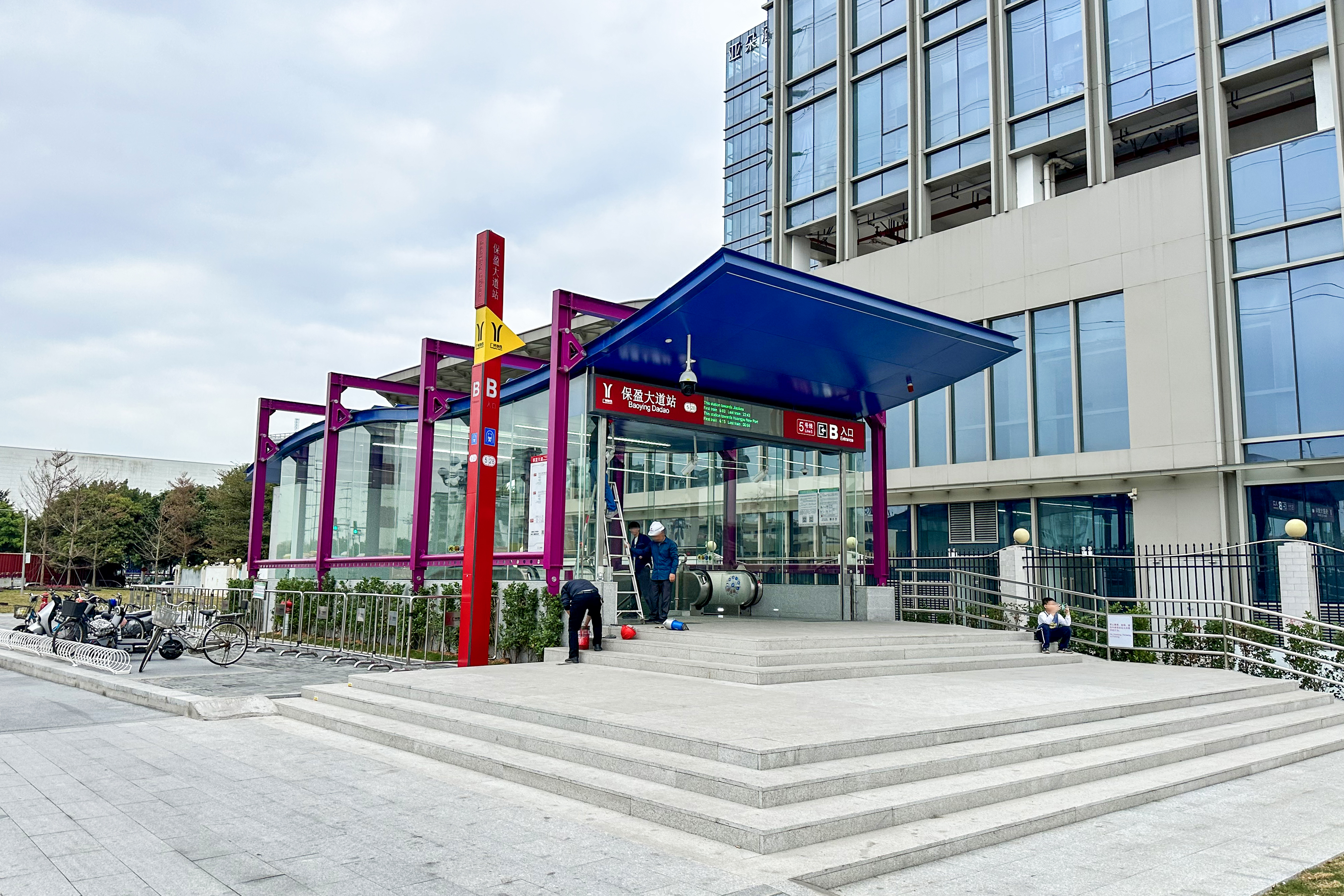
Entrance B

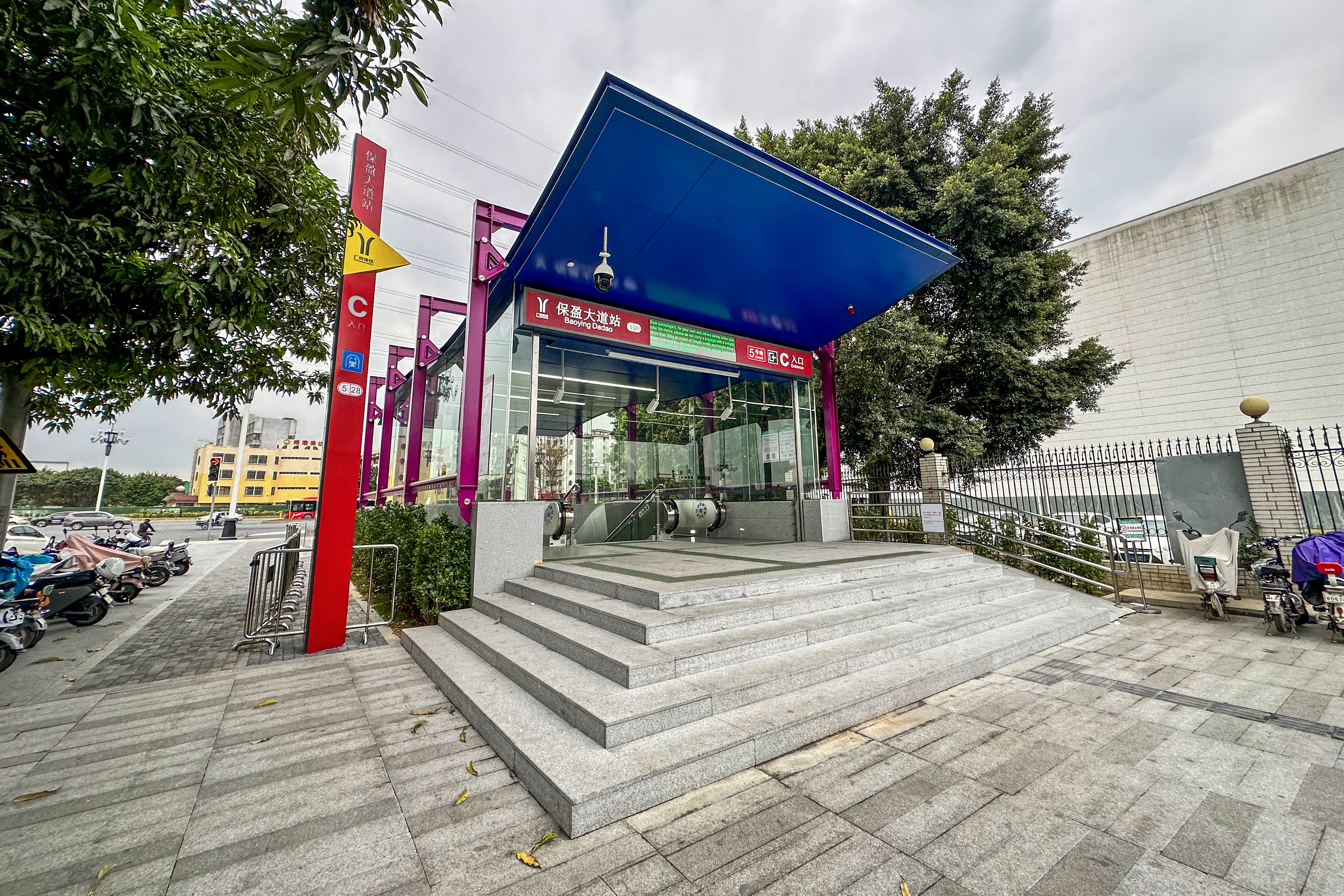
Entrance C

== Gallery ==
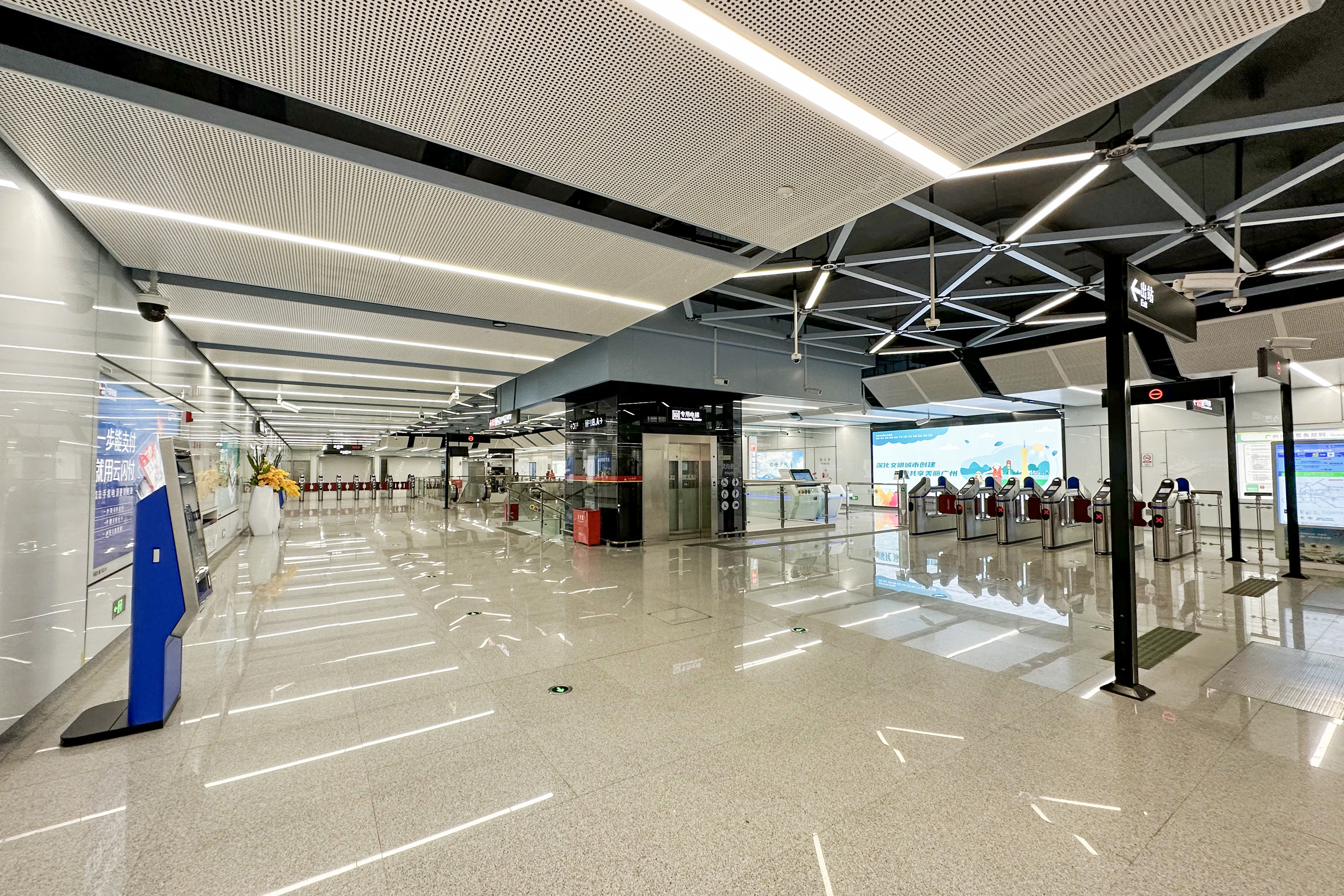
Concourse

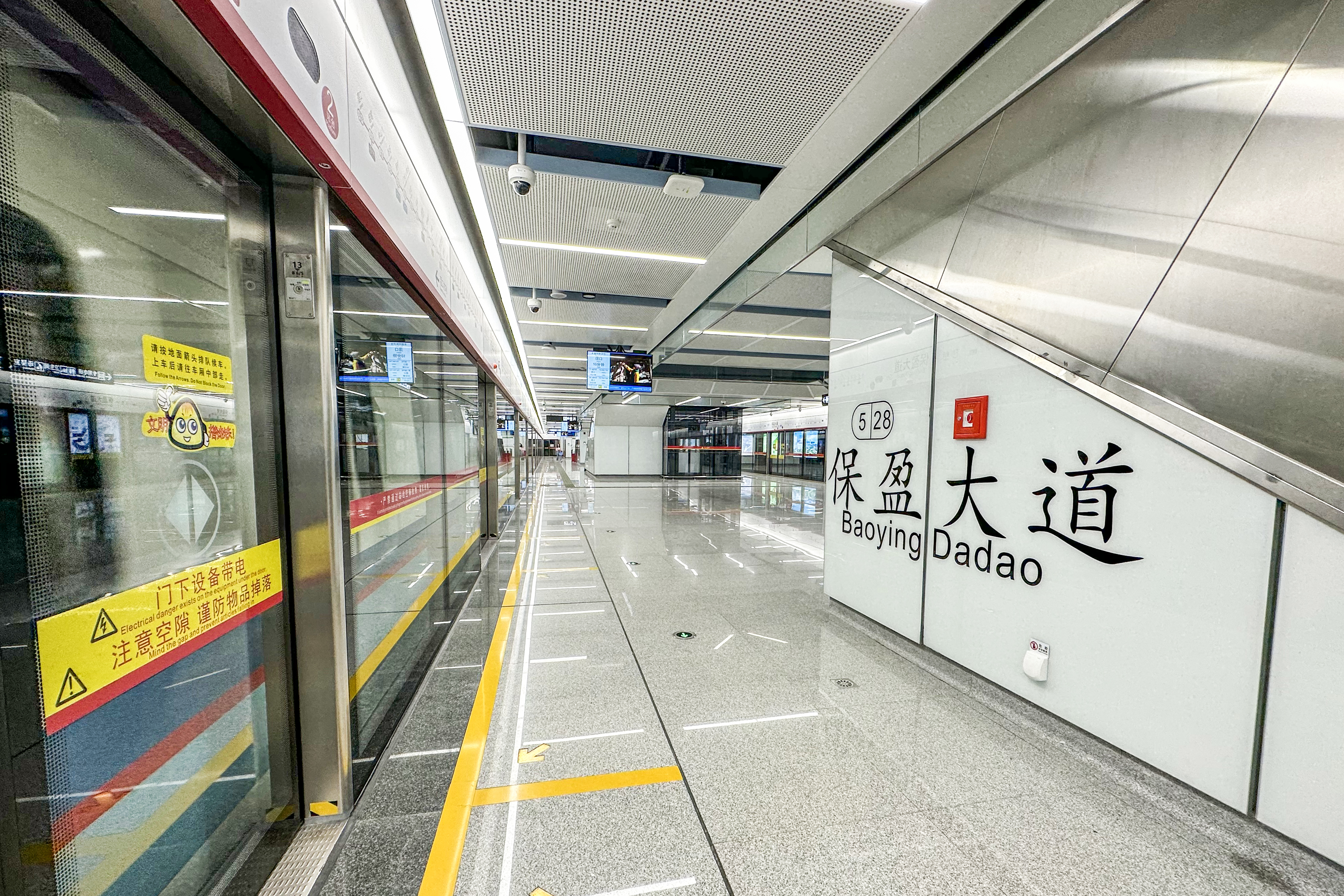
Platform 2 (towards Jiaokou)

== History ==
In May 2019, the station officially started construction, laying the first column on the eastern extension of Line 5. In December 2021, the station topped out. On 30 June 2022, as the last section of the eastern extension of Line 5, the right line section from the station to Guangzhou Development Zone (now Xiagang) began to tunnel.

On 27 February 2023, the Guangzhou Civil Affairs Bureau announced the initial names of stations on the east extension of Line 5, and this station was officially named Baoying Dadao station. The station opened on 28 December 2023 along with the eastern extension of Line 5.
