= Great Pagoda, Kew Gardens =

Pagoda at Kew Gardens, London

Great Pagoda
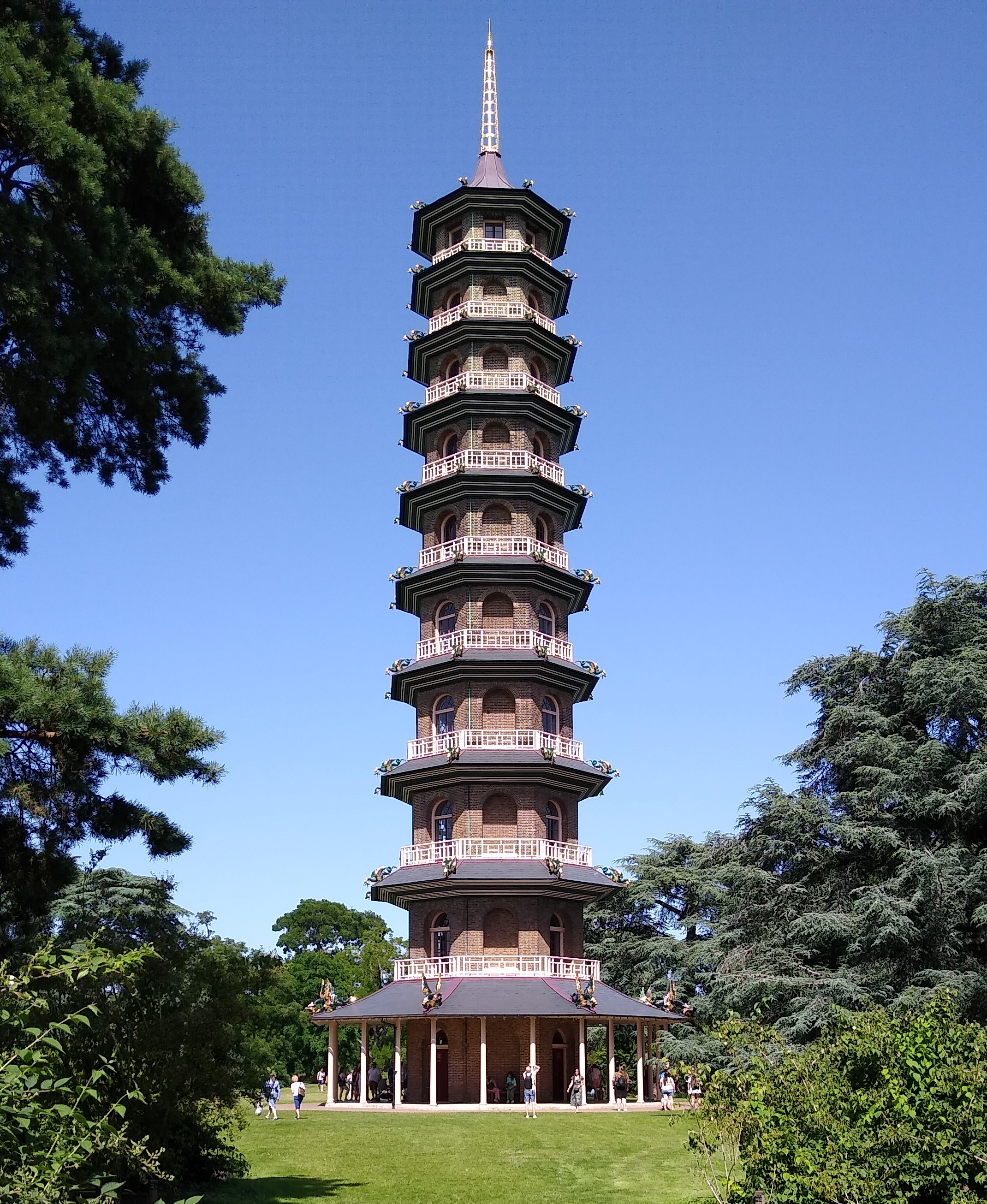
- "This supreme example of Chinoiserie"

- Location within London Borough of Richmond upon Thames
- 51.4713°N 0.2957°W
- Type: Pagoda
- Location: Kew Gardens, London

History
- Built: 1761

Site notes
- Height: 163 ft (50 m)
- Architect: Sir William Chambers
- Architectural style: Chinoiserie
- Restored: 2018
- Restored by: Austin-Smith:Lord
- Current use: Museum
- Governing body: Historic Royal Palaces

Listed Building – Grade I
- Official name: The Pagoda
- Designated: 10 January 1950
- Reference no.: 1262593

The Great Pagoda at Kew Gardens in southwest London was built in 1761 by Sir William Chambers as a present for Princess Augusta, the founder of the gardens. Constructed of grey brick, the pagoda comprises 10 storeys, totalling 163 ft (50 m) in height, with 253 steps to the viewing gallery. Closed for repairs in 2006, the pagoda was reopened in 2018 following a major programme of restoration. It is a Grade I listed building.

The ground floor roof is supported on wooden pillars. The storeys above this have arcaded balconies with Chinese Chippendale railings and curved roofs. The roofs are now of lead although they were originally covered in alternating bands of green and white tiles. The 80 restored dragons surmount each roof. (Note: Both the Historic England listing record, and Cherry and Pevsner's London 2: South guide were written prior to the 2018 restoration of the dragons.) Bridget Cherry, in her London 2: South volume of the Buildings of England series, describes the pagoda as "this supreme example of chinoiserie". A study of 2019, written after the restoration, ranked it as "the most important surviving chinoiserie building in Europe".

== History ==
Princess Augusta, widow of Frederick, Prince of Wales, established the botanic garden at Kew in 1759. Augusta employed Sir William Chambers to construct a number of architectural features in the gardens, including temples, a ruined arch and the Great Pagoda. The 18th century saw great increases in trade between China and the West, and led to an explosion of interest in Chinese art and culture. Chambers' pagoda was an early example of this. Born in Sweden, although educated in England, Chambers enlisted with the Swedish East India Company making three voyages to China and Bengal in the 1740s. Later in life, he was to publish a Dissertation on Oriental Gardening and he had already, in 1757, produced a volume, Designs of Chinese Buildings. His initial view of the gardens at Kew was unenthusiastic; "The gardens are not large, nor is their situation advantageous, the soil is in general barren". (Note: Chambers' dismissive view of the garden at Kew was turned to advantage in his The Gardens and Buildings at Kew in Surry, offering an opportunity to flatter his patrons, Princess Augusta and her advisor (director) the Earl of Bute; "princely magnificence, guided by a director equally skilled, overcame all difficulties. What was once a Desart has become an Eden".)

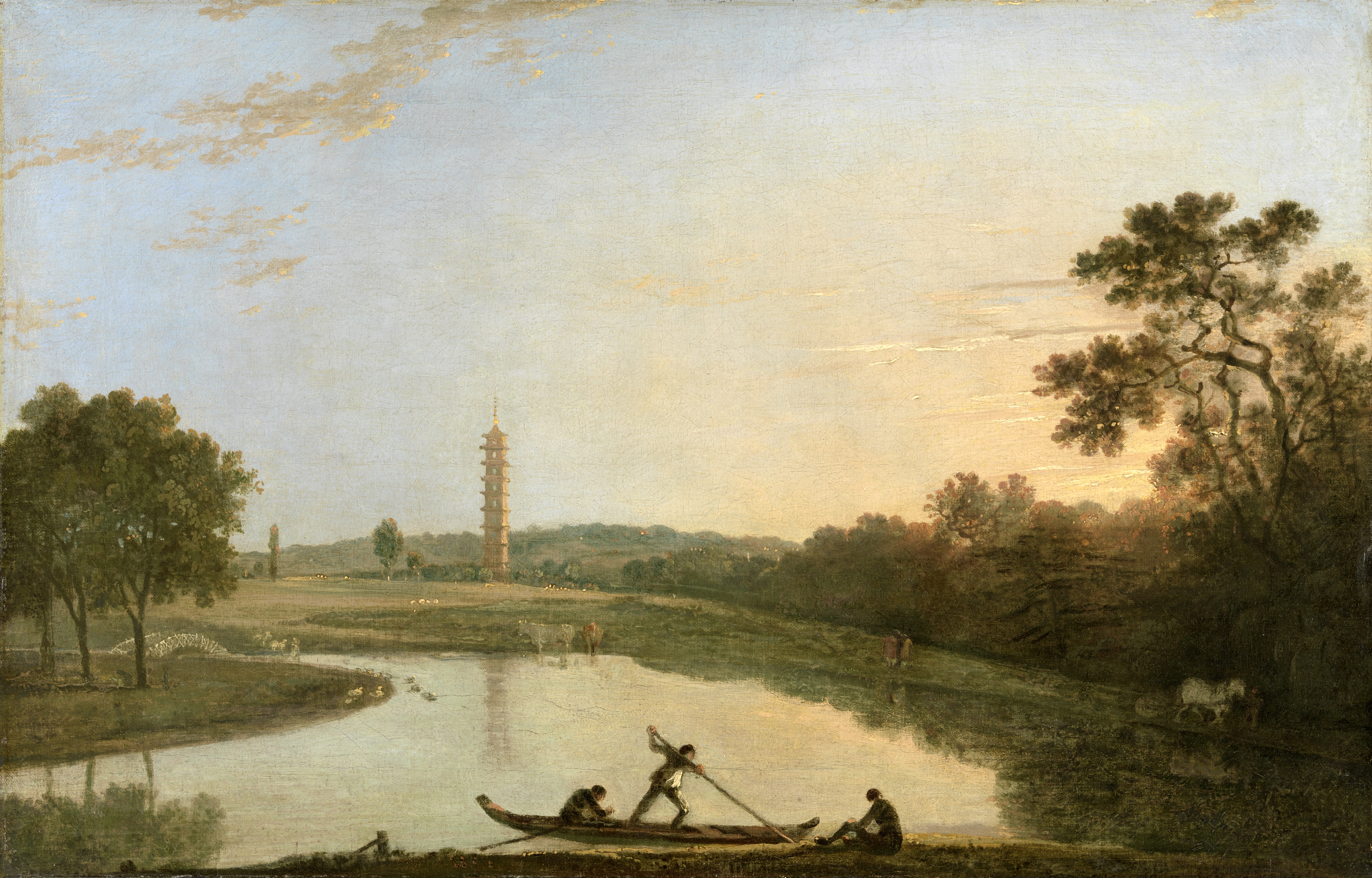
Kew Gardens - The Pagoda and Bridge by Richard Wilson, 1762

By instinct and training, Chambers was a Palladian architect. (Note: Chambers' most prominent work, Somerset House on The Strand, is not considered his most successful. Sir John Summerson suggested that "Chambers's genius is for the small unit rather than for the comprehensive whole".) In his Treatise on Civil Architecture, he wrote, "Amongst the restorers of the ancient Roman architecture, the style of Palladio is correct and elegant". Nevertheless, he was quite willing to employ Chinese structural designs, although he considered them to be "toys", only suitable as inspiration for garden ornaments. Chambers himself described the inspiration for the pagoda in his The Gardens and Buildings at Kew in Surry, published in 1763. "The design is an imitation of the Chinese Taa, described in my account of the Buildings, Gardens &c of the Chinese". He had already designed an earlier structure at Kew in such a style, The House of Confucius. (Note: Some historians suggest that The House of Confucius pre-dates Chambers' arrival at Kew and that, although he certainly drew it, he did not design it.)

A 2013 study by The Georgian Group looked at possible Chinese models for the Great Pagoda, acknowledging that Chambers, unlike almost all of his contemporary architects, had been to China and therefore had a wider range of possible sources on which to draw. Aldous Bertram, the paper's author, considers the Porcelain Tower of Nanjing as an inspiration, but suggests two Cantonese pagodas as more likely sources, the Chigang Pagoda and the Pazhou Pagoda, both in the city of Guangzhou, both dating from the early 17th century, and both almost certainly seen by Chambers during his Chinese expeditions.

The Great Pagoda was completed in only six months. The speed of completion and the quality of construction were points of pride for Chambers; "the walls of the building are composed of very hard bricks...neatly laid, and with such care, that there is not the least crack or fracture in the whole structure, notwithstanding its great height, and the expedition with which it was built". 80 gilded dragons decorated the roofs of its ten storeys although these had been removed by 1784. (Note: The rumour that the dragons decorating the roofs were solid gold and were removed and sold to relieve the Prince Regent's gambling debts is unfounded.) The height of the building impressed contemporaries; in 1762, Horace Walpole wrote to a friend, "the Pagoda at Kew begins to rise above the trees and soon you will see it from Yorkshire". (Note: Chambers designed two other structures to flank the pagoda, a Moorish Alhambra and a Domed Mosque, but neither survives.)

During the Second World War the pagoda was used as a munitions test site, with holes being opened up through each floor to allow smoke bombs to be dropped the height of the tower. By the late 20th century, the pagoda was in a dilapidated state and was closed to the public. A major restoration project undertaken jointly by the Royal Botanic Gardens, Kew, and Historic Royal Palaces saw the restoration of the pagoda, including the re-carving and reinstatement of the dragons, and its reopening in 2018. The restoration worked towards reinstatement and restoration of as many original architectural features as possible, drawing on the available historical evidence. (Note: The restoration, costing £5m, faced many challenges. Historic Royal Palaces stated that the reconstruction, and placing, of the replica dragons was among the most difficult.) A master copy of one of the dragons was carved in African cedar wood, and seven more were replicated for the lowest roof. Carving was undertaken by Tim Crawley, Head of Historic Carving at the City and Guilds of London Art School. The remainder were fabricated in nylon using 3D modelling technology, as the weight of the wooden sculptures would have been too great for the roofs. The restoration has won a number of design awards.

== Gallery ==
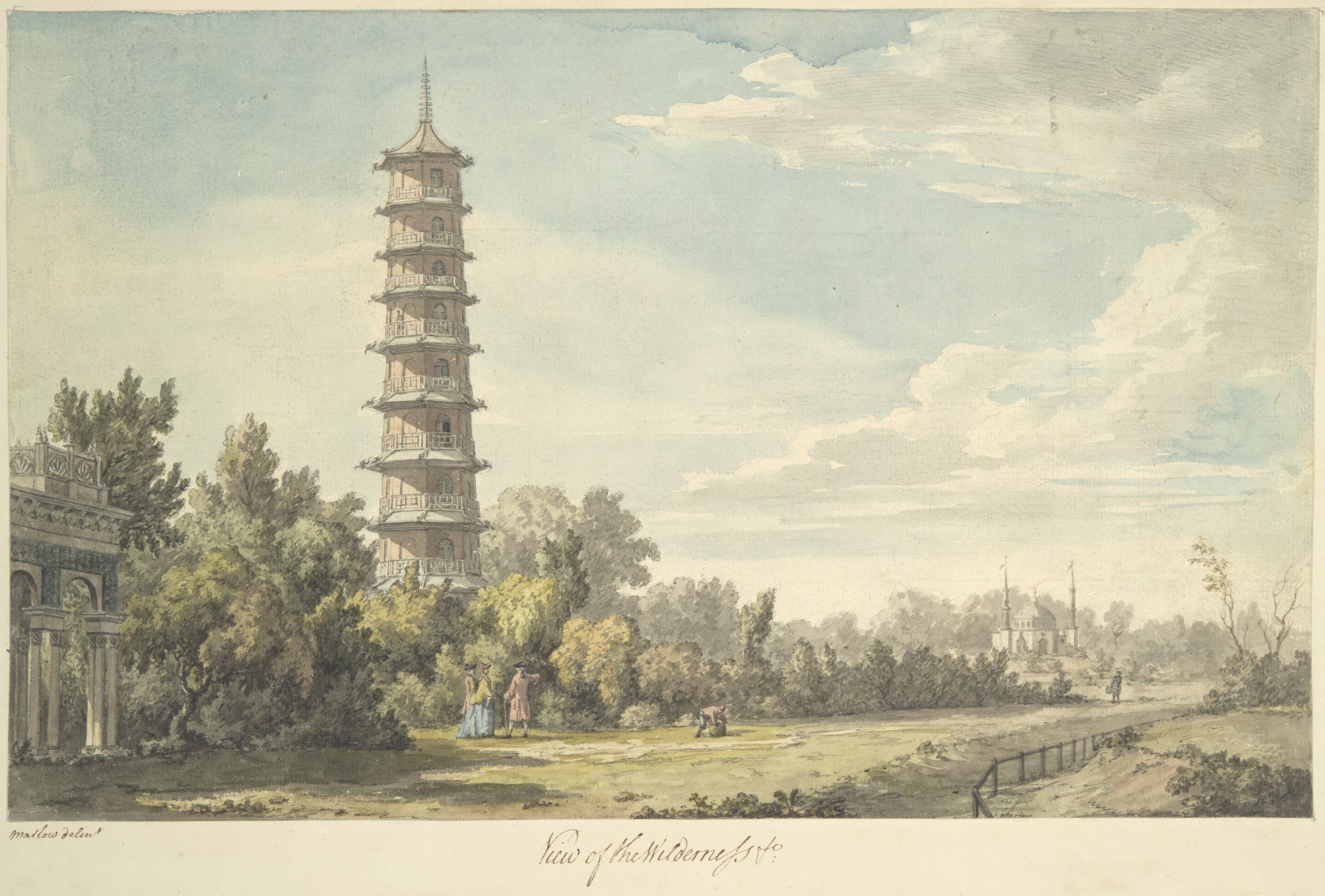
A view of the pagoda in 1763, a year after completion

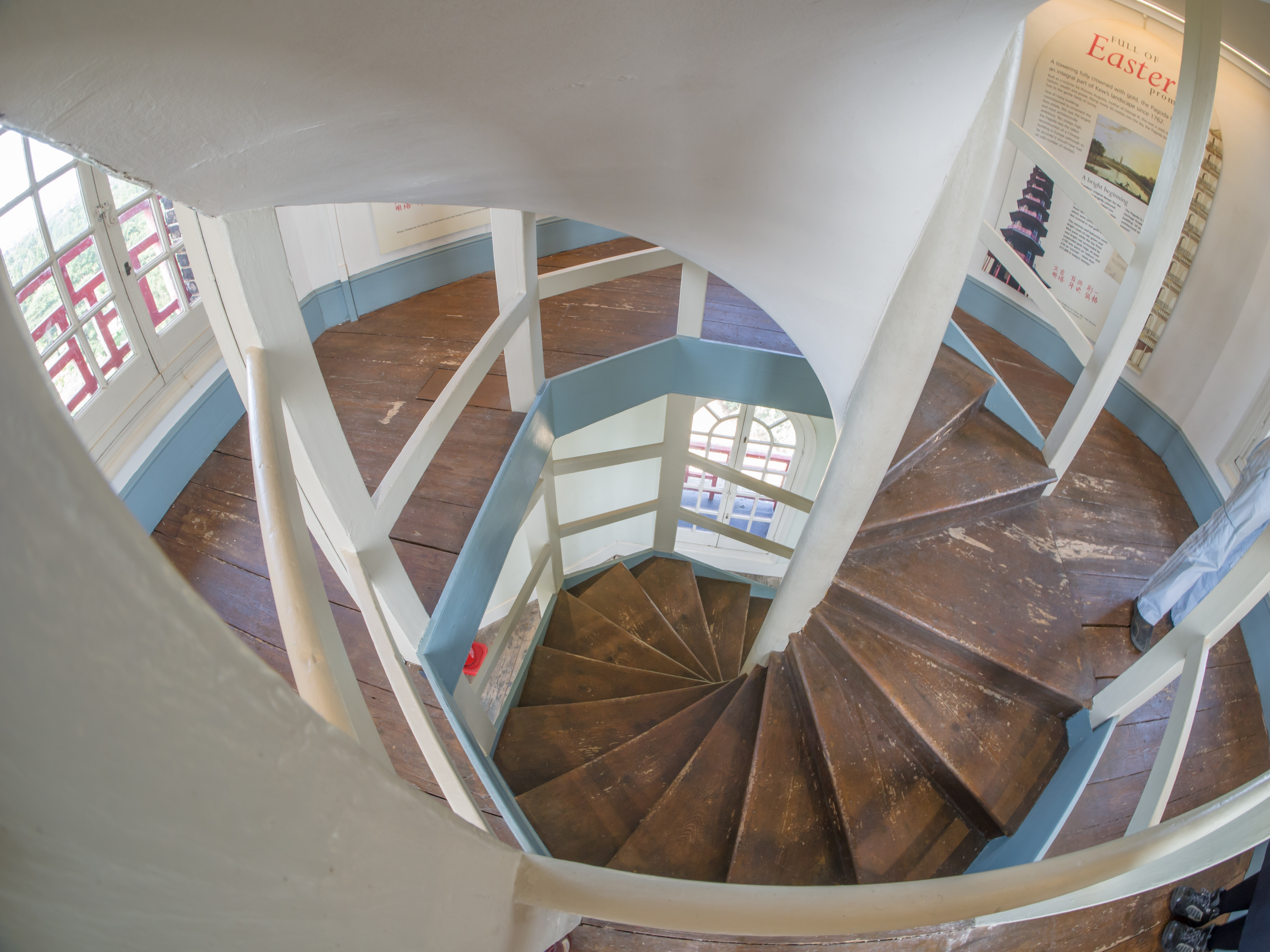
The pagoda's interior staircase

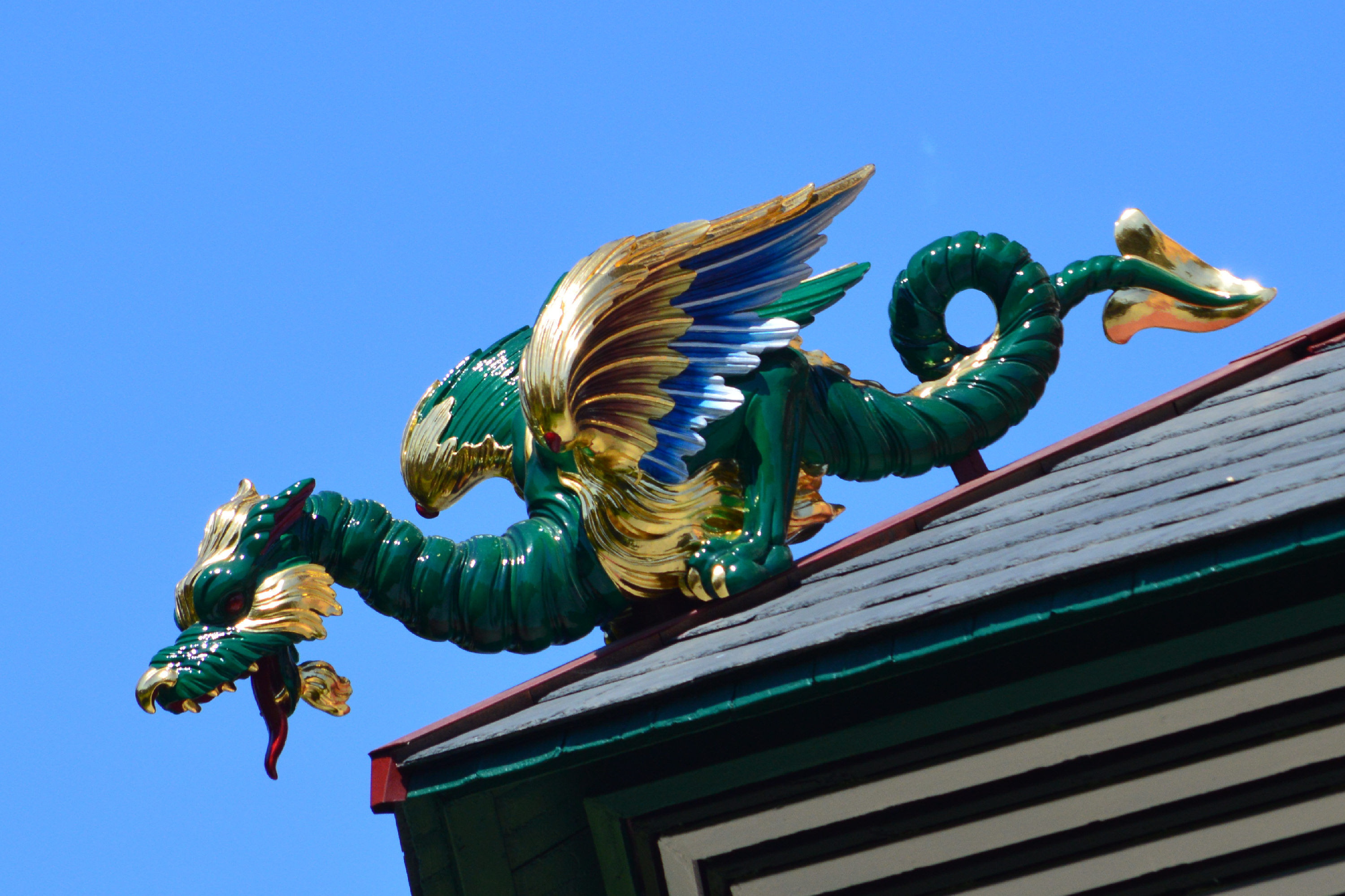
A restored dragon

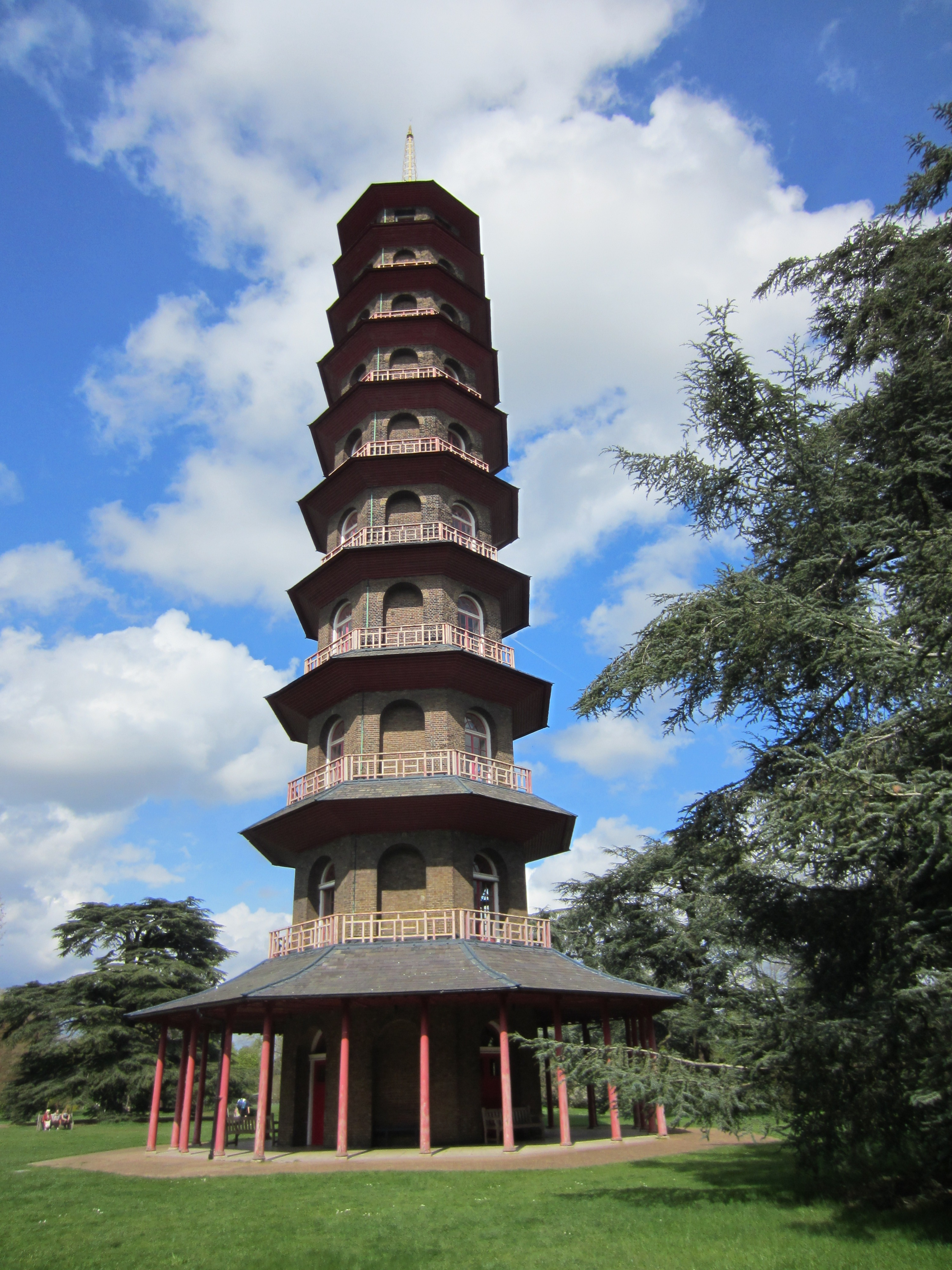
The pagoda in 2012 before completion of the restoration

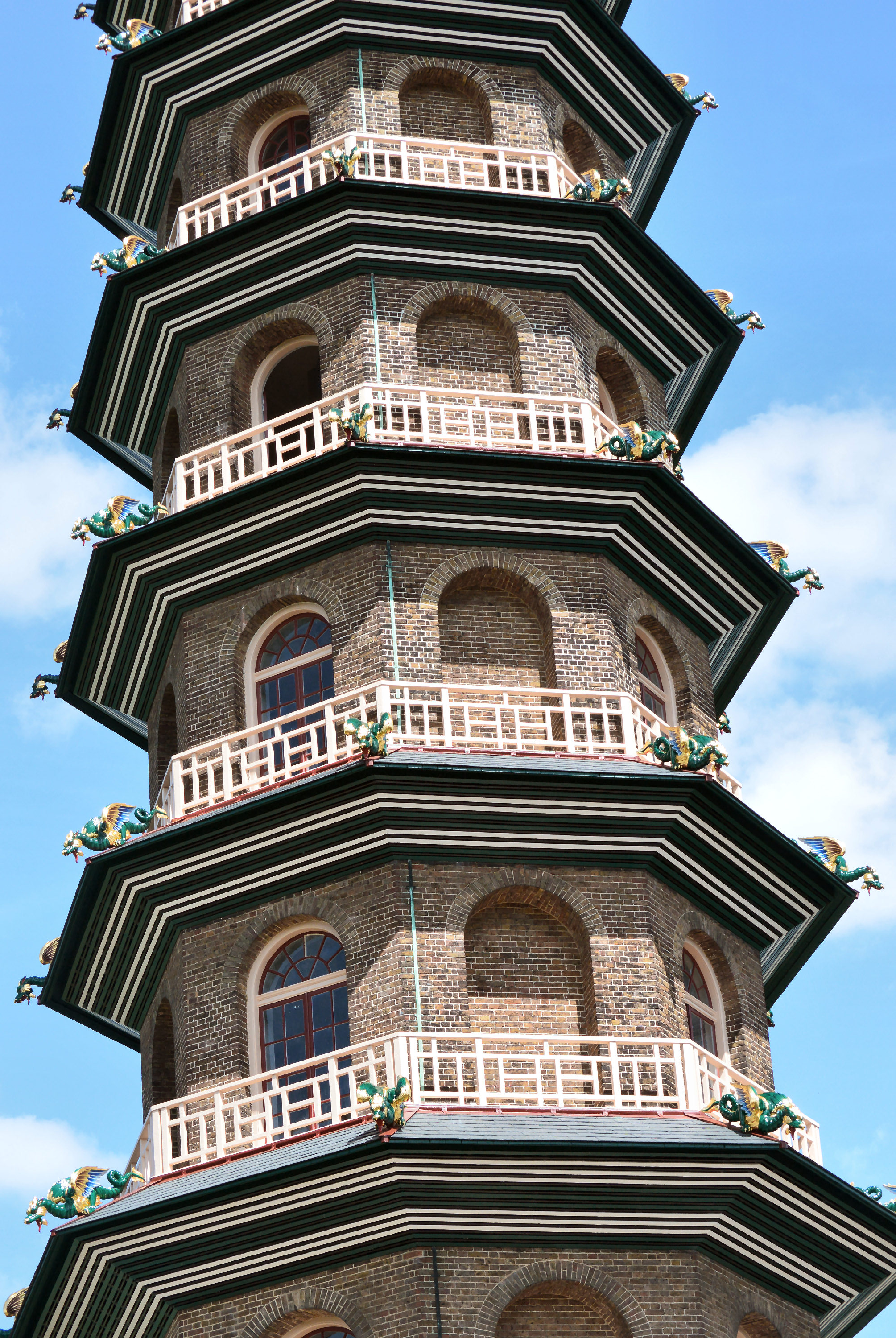
The pagoda in 2018 after restoration

Video of the Great Pagoda at Kew Gardens

== Sources ==
- Bertram, Aldous (2013). "Cantonese Models for the Great Pagoda at Kew" (PDF). The Georgian Group Journal. XXI: 47–57.
- Cherry, Bridget; Pevsner, Nikolaus (2002). London 2: South. The Buildings of England. New Haven, US and London: Yale University Press. ISBN 978-0-300-09651-4. OCLC 844260066.
- Fleming, Laurence; Gore, Alan (1988). The English Garden. London: Spring Books. ISBN 978-0-600-55728-9. OCLC 46417198.
- Guinness, Desmond; Sadler Jr., Julius Trousdale (1976). The Palladian Style in England, Ireland and America. London: Thames & Hudson. OCLC 248789570.
- Harris, John; Snodin, Michael (1996). Sir William Chambers: Architect to George III. New Haven, US and London: Yale University Press. ISBN 978-0-300-06940-2. OCLC 750912646.
- Her Majesty's Stationery Office (1987). The Royal Botanic Gardens Kew. London: HMSO. ISBN 978-0-112-50009-4. OCLC 499111246.
- Paterson, Allen (2008). The Gardens at Kew. London: Frances Lincoln. ISBN 978-0-711-22536-7. OCLC 716841370.
- Summerson, John (1955). Architecture in Britain 1530-1830. Pelican History of Art. London: Penguin Books. OCLC 805110174.
- Wittkower, Rudolf (1974). Palladio and English Palladianism. London: Thames & Hudson. OCLC 462688249.
