= Ersha Island station =

Guangzhou Metro Line 12 station

Ersha Island 二沙岛
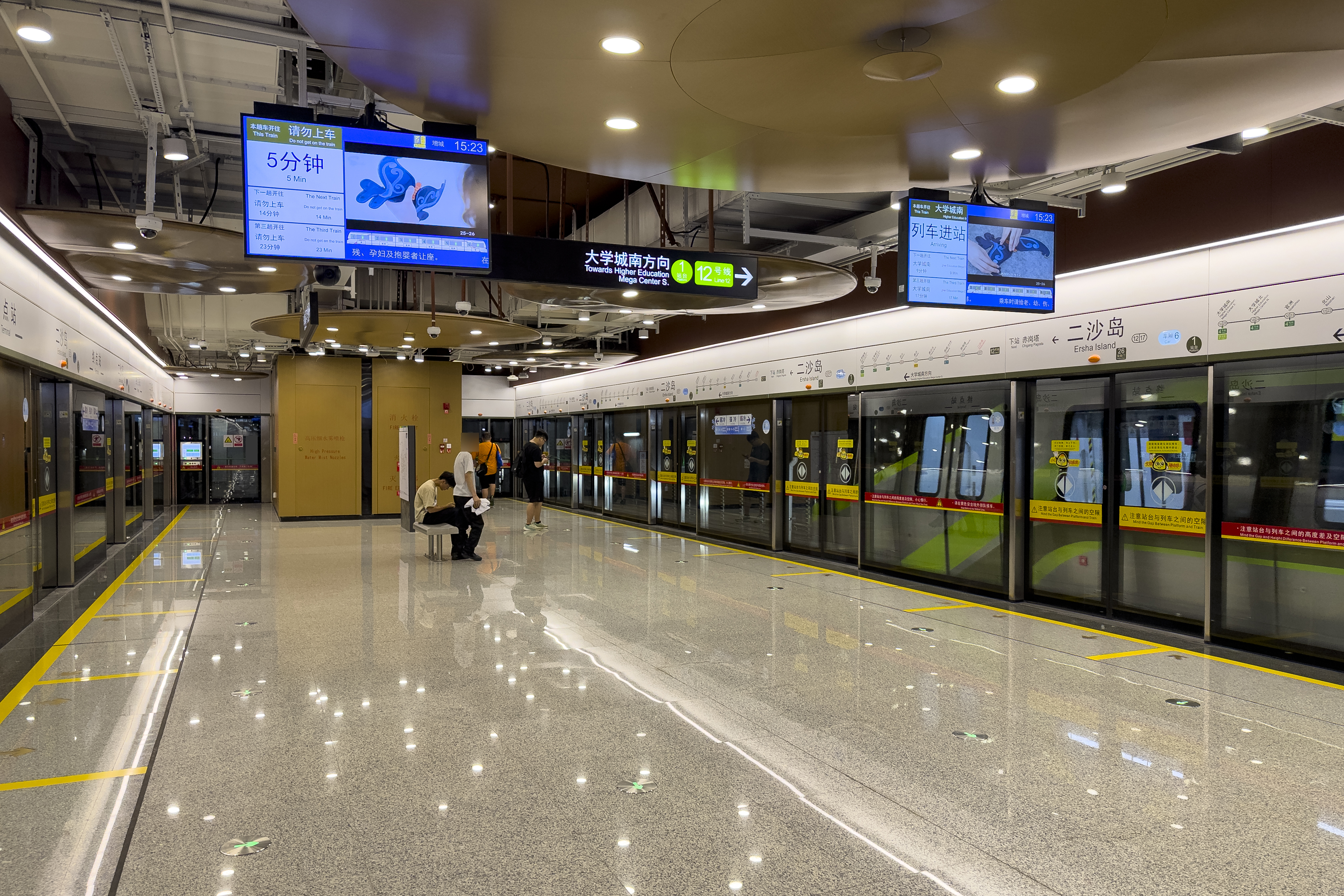
- Platform

Chinese name
- Simplified Chinese: 二沙岛站
- Traditional Chinese: 二沙島站
Transcriptions
Standard Mandarin
- Hanyu Pinyin: Èrshādǎo Zhàn
Yue: Cantonese
- Yale Romanization: Yihsāadóu Jaahm
- Jyutping: Ji^{6}saa^{1}dou^{2} Zaam^{6}
- Hong Kong Romanization: Napier Island station

General information
- Location: North side of Yanyu Road (烟雨路) within Guangzhou Development Park, Ersha Island; Baiyun Subdistrict, Yuexiu District, Guangzhou, Guangdong; China
- Coordinates: 23°6′43.57″N 113°17′55.09″E
- Operator: Guangzhou Metro Co. Ltd.
- Line: Line 12
- Platforms: 3 (1 island platform and 1 side platform)
- Tracks: 3

Construction
- Structure type: Underground
- Accessible: Yes

Other information
- Station code: 1217

History
- Opened: 29 June 2025 (13 months ago)

Services
Preceding station	Guangzhou Metro	Following station
Terminus	Line 12 East section	Chigang Pagoda towards Higher Education Mega Center South
Future service (2026)
Donghu towards Xunfenggang	Line 12	Chigang Pagoda towards Higher Education Mega Center South
Location

Ersha Island station (simplified Chinese: 二沙岛站; traditional Chinese: 二沙島站; Jyutping: ji^{6} saa^{1} dou^{2} zaam^{6}; Cantonese Yale: Yihsāadóu Jaahm) is a station on Line 12 of the Guangzhou Metro and the terminus of the East section of the line. It is located underground on the north side of Yanyu Road within Guangzhou Development Park on Ersha Island in Guangzhou's Yuexiu District. It opened on 29 June 2025.

== Station layout ==
This station is a two-storey underground station. The ground level is the exit, and it is surrounded by Yanyu Road, Datong Road, Guangzhou Development Park, Guangdong Overseas Chinese Museum, Xinghai Concert Hall and other nearby buildings. The first floor is the concourse, and the second floor is the platform for Line 12.

This station is a cultural themed station on Line 12, with the design theme of "Juntian Guangle" (均天广乐), the ceiling of the station adopts white air ducts and circular acoustic reflectors, and the concourse adopts irregular shape walls, so as to reflect the unique spatial texture and acoustic effect of the station to reproduce a concert hall.

G	-	Exits A, B, C
L1; Concourse	Lobby	Ticket Machines, Customer Service, Shops, Police Station, Security Facilities
L2; Platforms	Side platform, doors will open on the right (Toilets, Nursery)
L2; Platforms	Platform 2	12 reserved platform
L2; Platforms	Platform 3	12 termination platform
L2; Platforms	Island platform, doors will open on the left (Toilets, Nursery)
L2; Platforms	Platform 1	12 towards Higher Education Mega Center South (Chigang Pagoda)

=== Concourse ===
There are automatic ticket machines and an AI customer service center at the concourse. In order to facilitate pedestrian access, the north side of the concourse is divided into the paid area, which is equipped with multiple sets of escalators, stairs and special elevators, which are connected to the two platforms of Line 12 respectively.

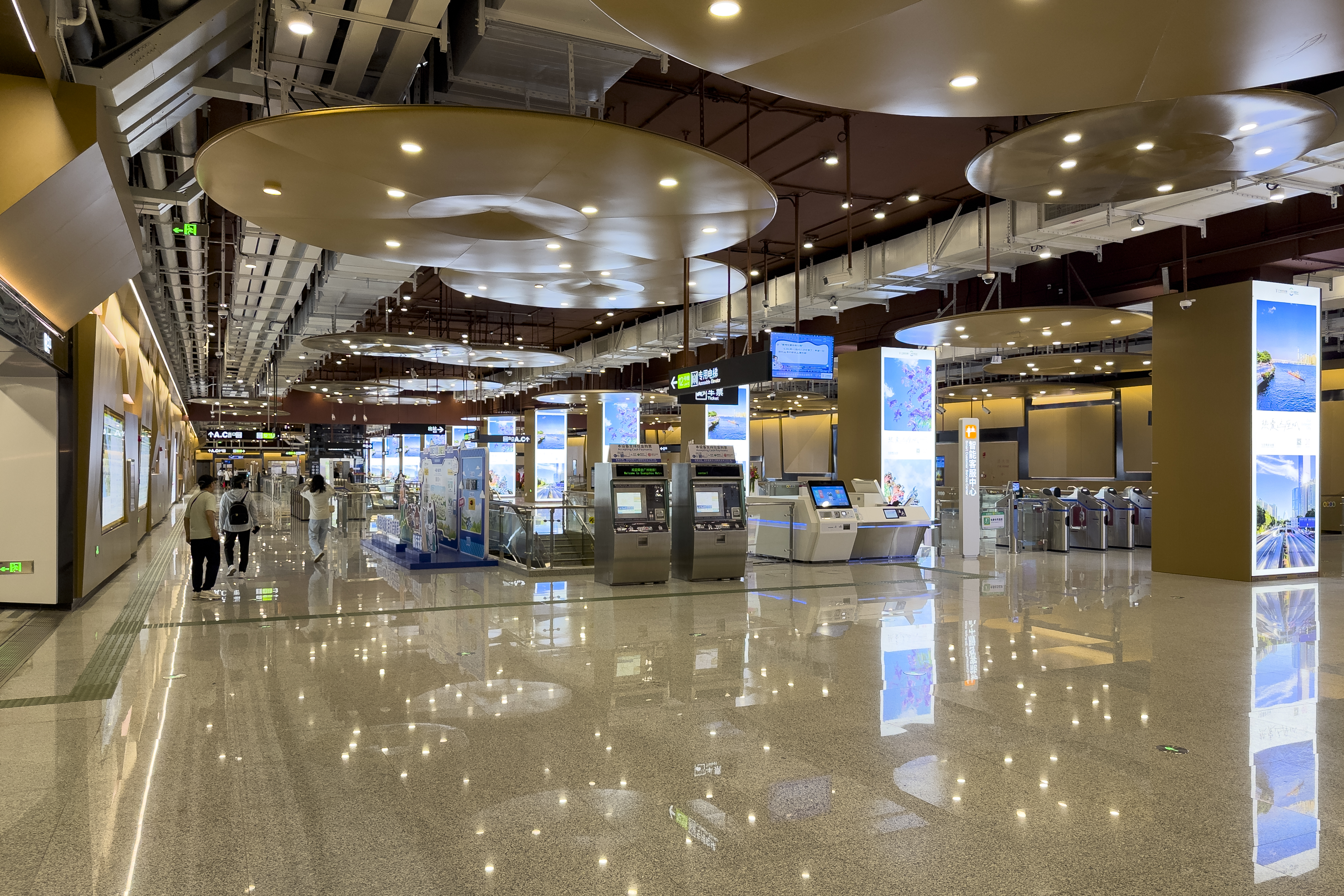
Concourse

=== Platform ===
The station has an island platform, and a side platform located under the Guangzhou Development Park.

In addition, there is a double storage track running through the station to the east end of the station, with two maneuvering tracks to the east of the storage tracks connecting to the main line in the direction of Xunfenggang, and two crossovers connecting the main line up and down respectively to the west.

As a temporary terminus for the East section of Line 12, only the island platform is open to passengers. At this time, the train will route to Platform 3 via the storage track to clear passengers before going to the main line in the direction of Higher Education Mega Center South through the maneuvering track at the west end of the station to turn back after the station before going to Platform 1 to pick up passengers.

=== Entrances/exits ===
The station has 3 points of entry/exit. Exits B and C are equipped with elevators.

- A: Yanyu Road, Guangzhou Zhixin High School Ersha Island Campus
- B: Xiaowu Street, Xinghai Concert Hall, Guangzhou Symphony Orchestra
- C: Datong Road, Guangdong Provincial Hospital of Chinese Medicine Ersha Island Hospital
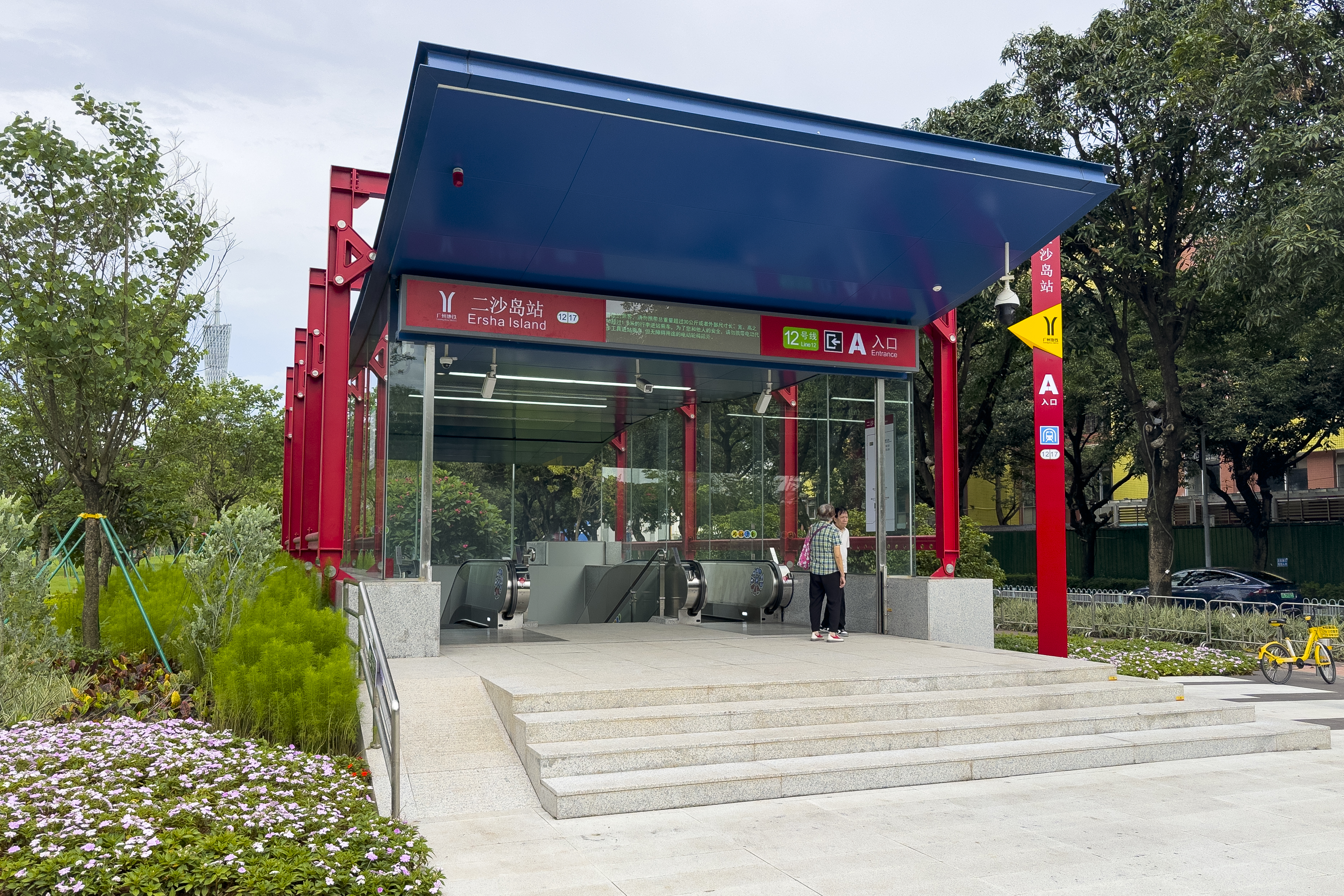
Entrance A

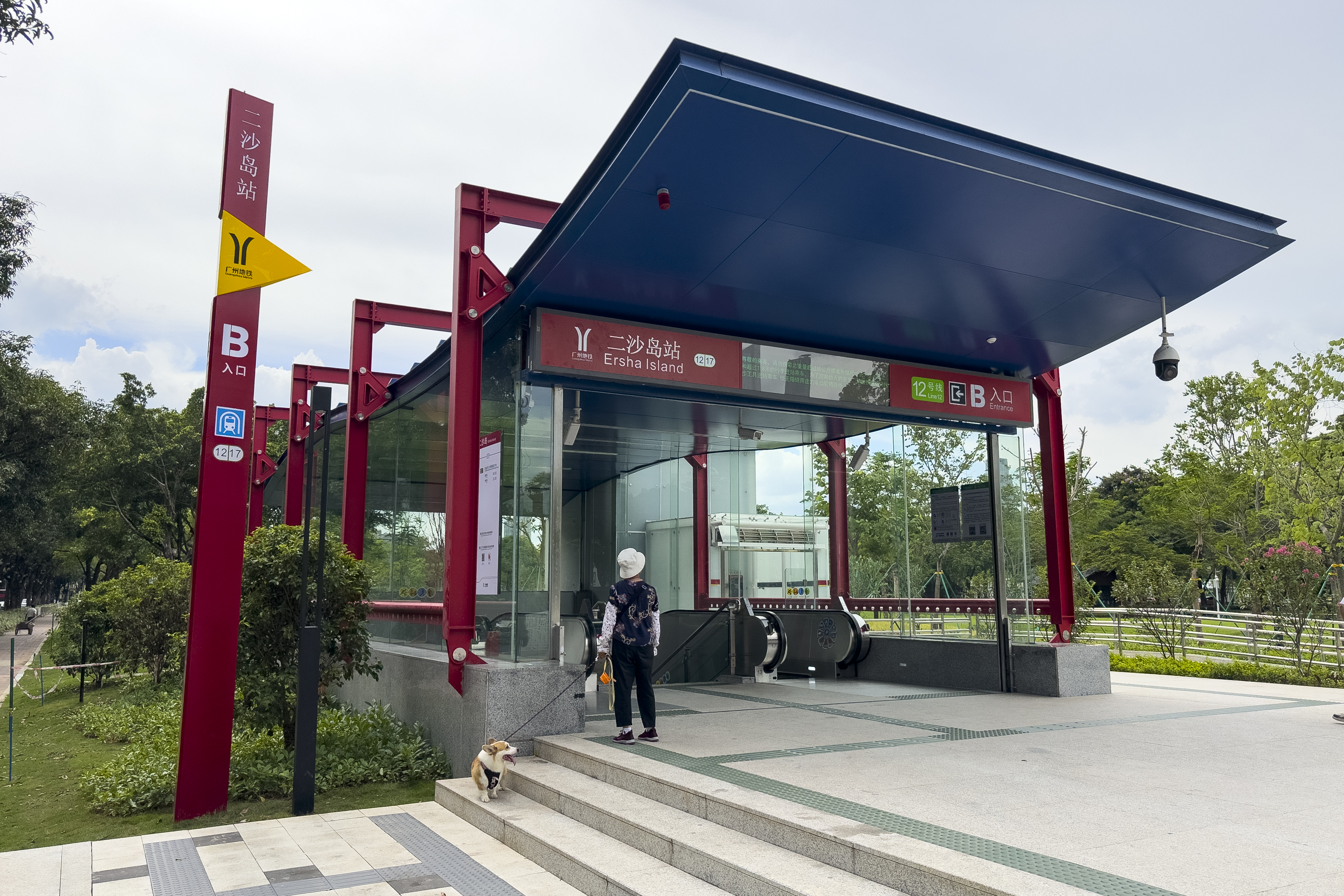
Entrance B

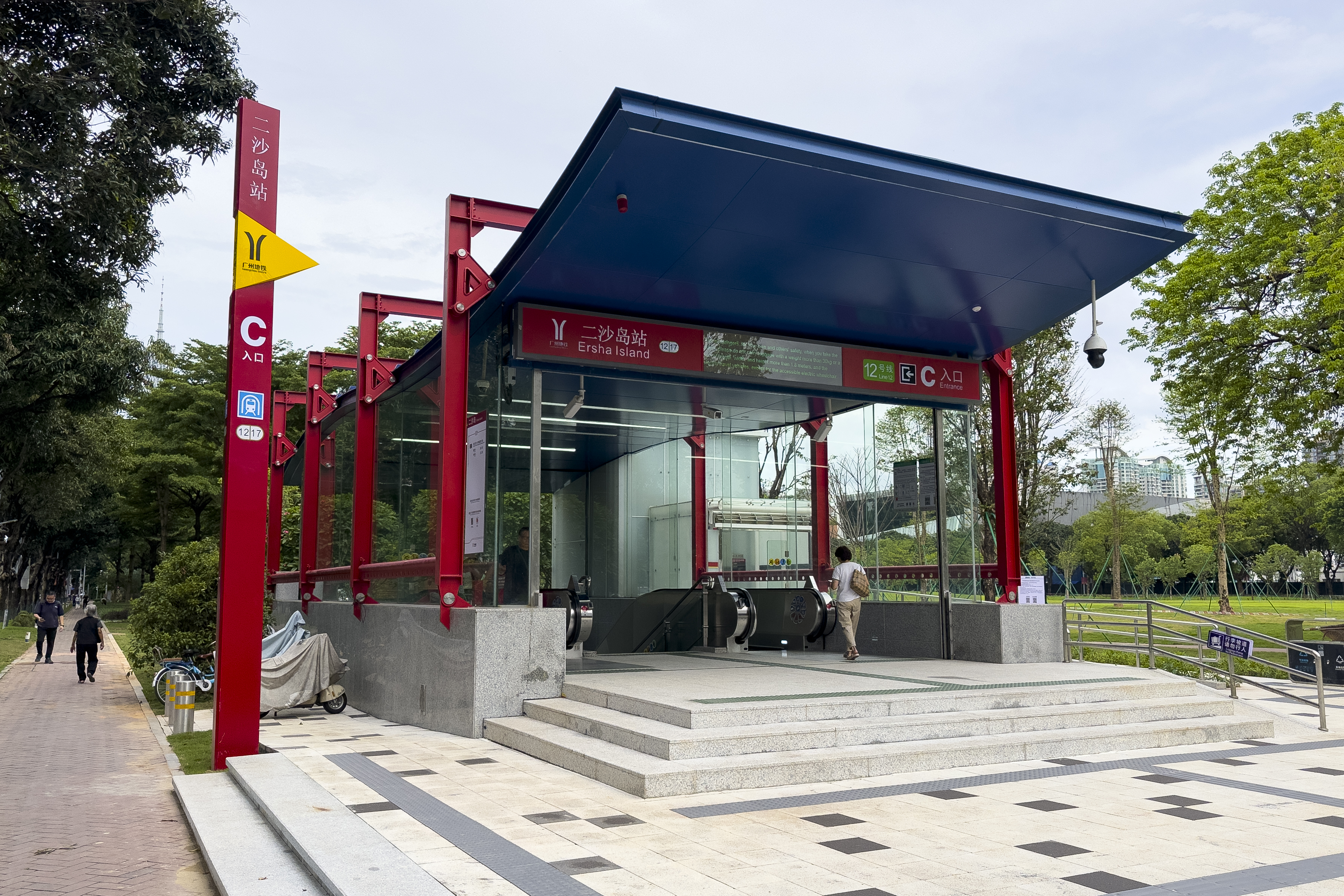
Entrance C

== History ==
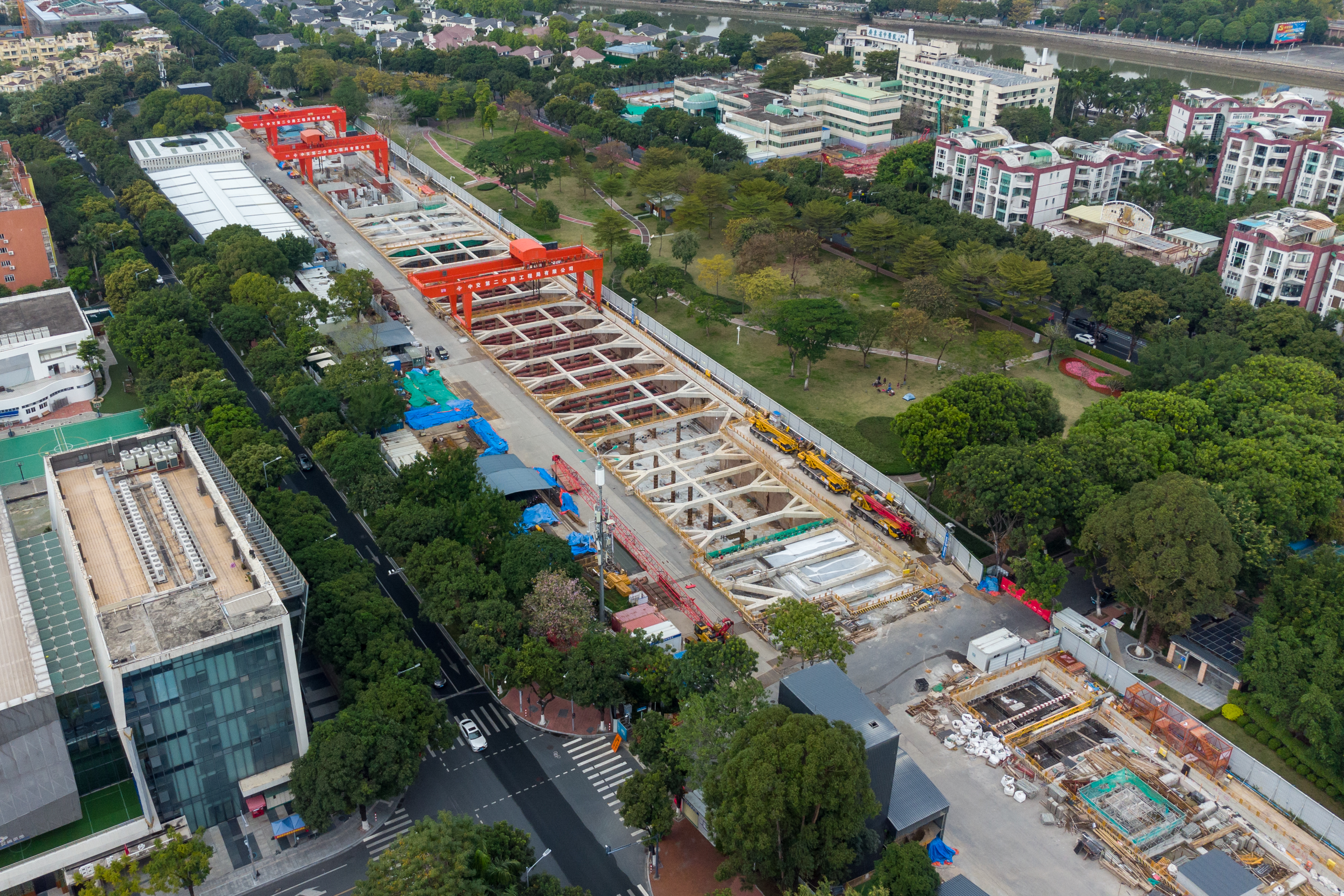
Construction site (February 2022)

In response to the construction of the station, part of the Guangzhou Development Park was enclosed in May 2020 for the construction of the main station structure. Subsequently, Xiaowu Street was closed on 7 October of the same year to facilitate station construction.

On 6 April 2022, the roof slab was sealed. The station completed the "three rights" transfer in January 2025. The station opened on 29 June 2025.

== Future expansion ==
In the future, Line 12 trains coming from Higher Education Mega Center South station will terminate at Xunfenggang station once the Central section of Line 12 opens.
