= Chigang Pagoda station =

Guangzhou Metro Line 12 station

Chigang Pagoda 赤岗塔
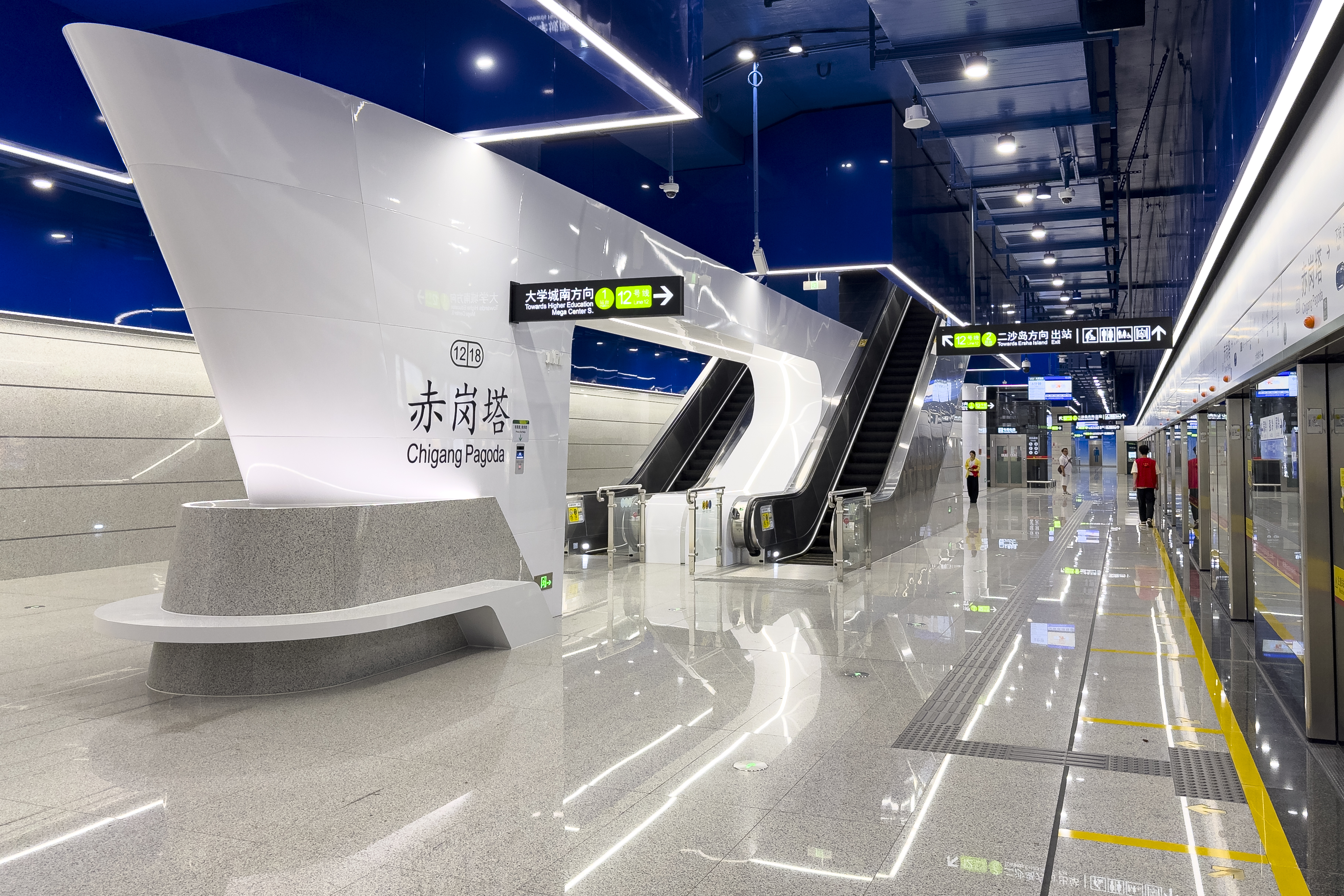
- Platform 1 (towards Higher Education Mega Center South)

Chinese name
- Simplified Chinese: 赤岗塔站
- Traditional Chinese: 赤崗塔站
Transcriptions
Standard Mandarin
- Hanyu Pinyin: Chìgǎng Tǎ Zhàn
Yue: Cantonese
- Yale Romanization: Cěkgōng Taap Jaahm
- Jyutping: Cek^{3}gong^{1} Taap^{3} Zaam^{6}

General information
- Location: East side of the intersection of Yizhou Road (艺洲路) and Yiyuan Road (艺苑路); Chigang Subdistrict, Haizhu District, Guangzhou, Guangdong; China
- Coordinates: 23°6′16.88″N 113°19′7.92″E
- Operator: Guangzhou Metro Co. Ltd.
- Line: Line 12
- Platforms: 2 (2 island platforms) (Note: the reserved Line 28 platforms are enclosed on the outer side)
- Tracks: 2

Construction
- Structure type: Underground
- Accessible: Yes

Other information
- Station code: 1218

History
- Opened: 29 June 2025 (16 months ago)
- Former names: Lingnan Square (岭南广场), Guangzhou Art Museum (广州艺博院)

Services
Preceding station	Guangzhou Metro	Following station
Ersha Island Terminus	Line 12 East section	Chigang towards Higher Education Mega Center South
Future services
Ersha Island towards Xunfenggang	Line 12	Chigang towards Higher Education Mega Center South
Location

Chigang Pagoda station (simplified Chinese: 赤岗塔站; traditional Chinese: 赤崗塔站; Jyutping: cek^{3} gong^{1} taap^{3} zaam^{6}; Cantonese Yale: Cěkgōng Taap Jaahm) is a station on Line 12 of the Guangzhou Metro. It is located underground on the east side of the intersection of Yizhou Road and Yiyuan Road in Guangzhou's Haizhu District. It opened on 29 June 2025.

== Station layout ==
This station is a four-storey underground station, with a gross floor area of 64,234 meters. The ground level is the exit, and it is surrounded by Yiyuan Road, Yizhou Road, Canton Tower Road, Canton Tower Plaza, Chigang Pagoda, Guangzhou Art Museum, Pearl River Dijing Garden and other nearby buildings. The first floor is the transfer floor between the concourse and exits and the reserved Yizhou Road sunken tunnel project, the second floor is reserved for commercial facilities, the third floor is the concourse, and the fourth floor is the platform for Line 12.

After the completion of the station, the open space above the ground will be rebuilt into a parkland connecting to the Canton Tower, and the roadway of the original Yizhou Road will be moved underground, creating a sunken tunnel.

This station is a cultural themed station on Line 12, with the theme of "Heart of Guangzhou", the walls of the station are made of blue and white gradient glass curtain walls, and the station hall is equipped with LED light columns and decorative columns surrounded by sails.

G	-	Exits A and B
L1		Reserved for Yizhou Road Sunken Tunnel Project
L1	Mezzanine	Transfer floor between concourse and exits
L2		Reserved for underground commercial facilities
L3; Concourse	Lobby	Ticket Machines, Customer Service, Shops, Police Station, Security Facilities
L4; Platforms		28 reserved track area (enclosed)
L4; Platforms	Island platform, doors will open on the right (Toilets, Nursery)
L4; Platforms	Platform 2	12 towards Ersha Island (terminus)
L4; Platforms	Platform 1	12 towards Higher Education Mega Center South (Chigang)
L4; Platforms	Island platform, doors will open on the right (Toilets, Nursery)
L4; Platforms		28 reserved track area (enclosed)

=== Concourse ===
There are automatic ticket machines and an AI customer service center at the concourse. There are elevators, escalators and stairs in the fare-paid area for passengers to access the two platforms of Line 12 respectively.

There are convenience stores, bakeries and pastry shops and a variety of self-service facilities in the concourse. There is an automated external defibrillator near the station control center, which is near Exit B.

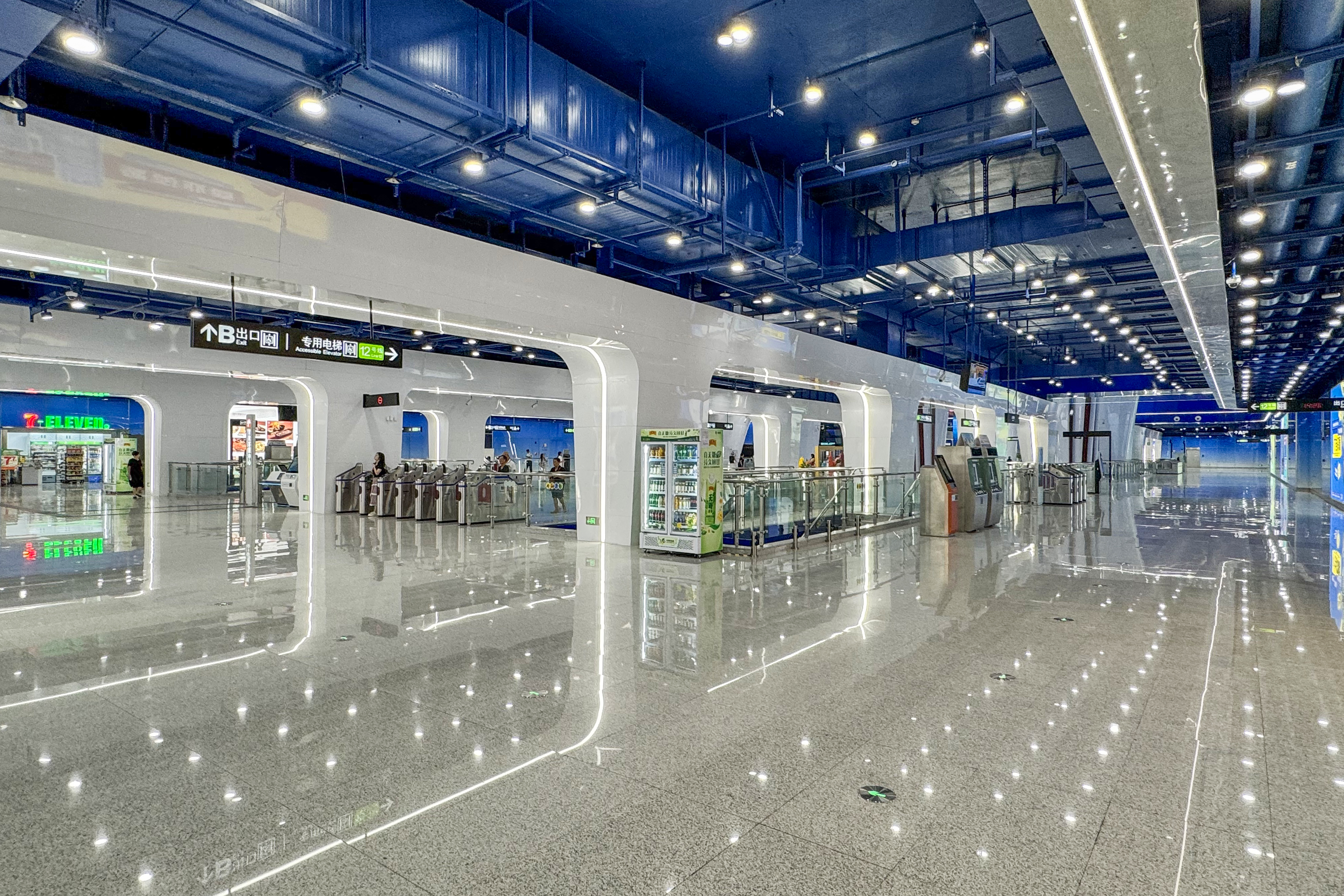
Concourse

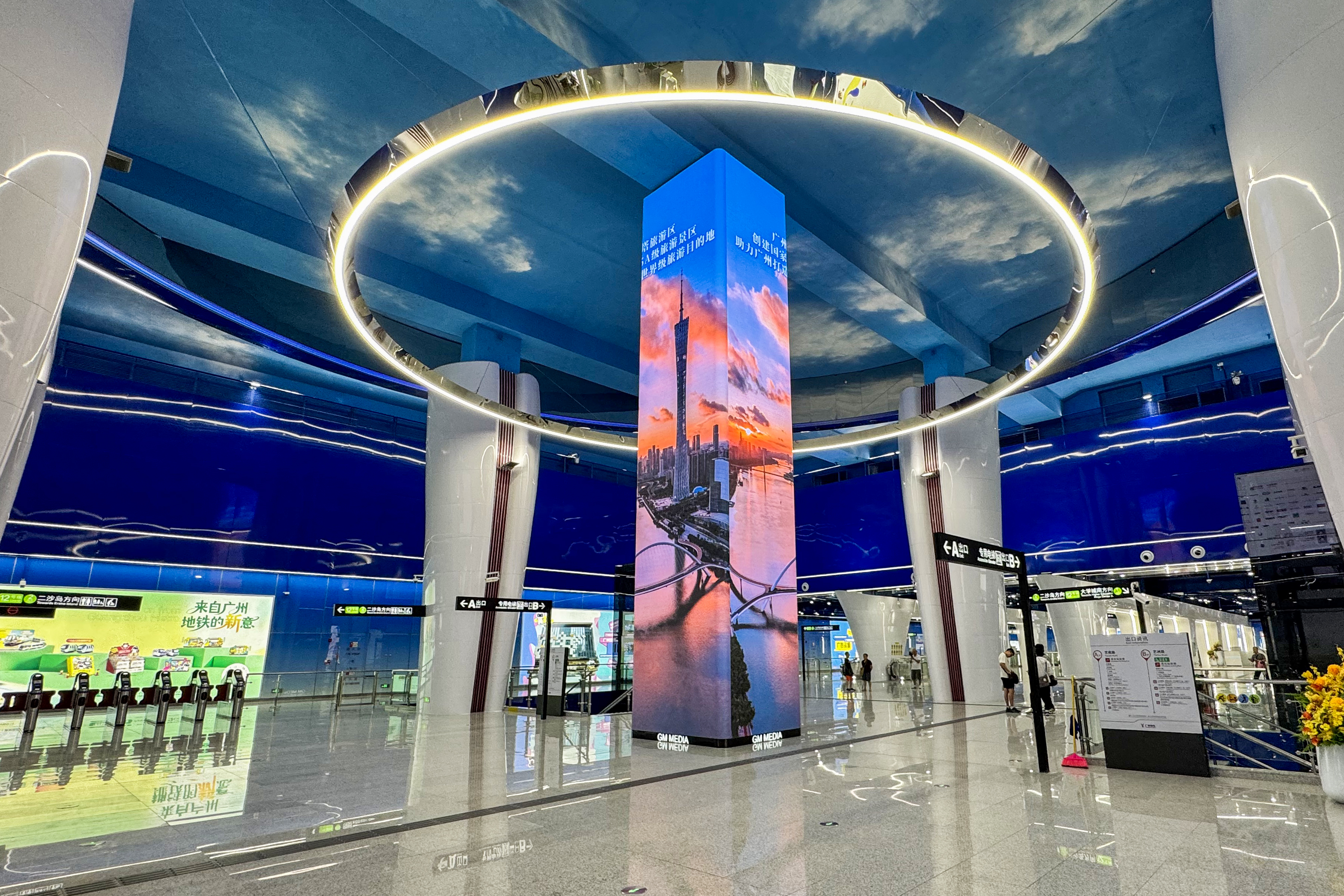
On the left side of the concourse, there is an LED light pillar surrounded by decorative columns in the shape of sails

=== Platform ===
The station has two island platforms side by side located under Yizhou Road, shared by Line 12 and Line 28. Line 12 uses Platforms 1 and 2 on the inner side, while the outer platforms reserved for Line 28 are closed by a decorative false wall and will not be used until Line 28 is constructed. Therefore, in the eyes of passengers, the station is only equipped with a pair of side platforms. Both platforms of the station have toilets and a nursery room at the west end of the station.

In addition, there is a storage track at the western end of the Line 12 platforms.

=== Entrances/exits ===
The station has 3 points of entry/exit. Exis A and B opened with the station, whereas Exit D on the north side was opened on 1 November 2026. Both transfer levels at this exit have interfaces leading to the Guangzhou Tower Plaza north of the station. Exit B is equipped with an elevator.

- A: Yijing Road, Youhe Road, Chigang Pagoda
- B: Chigang North Road, Canton Tower Road, Guangzhou Art Museum, Affiliated Stomatological Hospital of Guangzhou Medical University
- D: Yizhou Road, Canton Tower, Canton Tower station Exits A and B
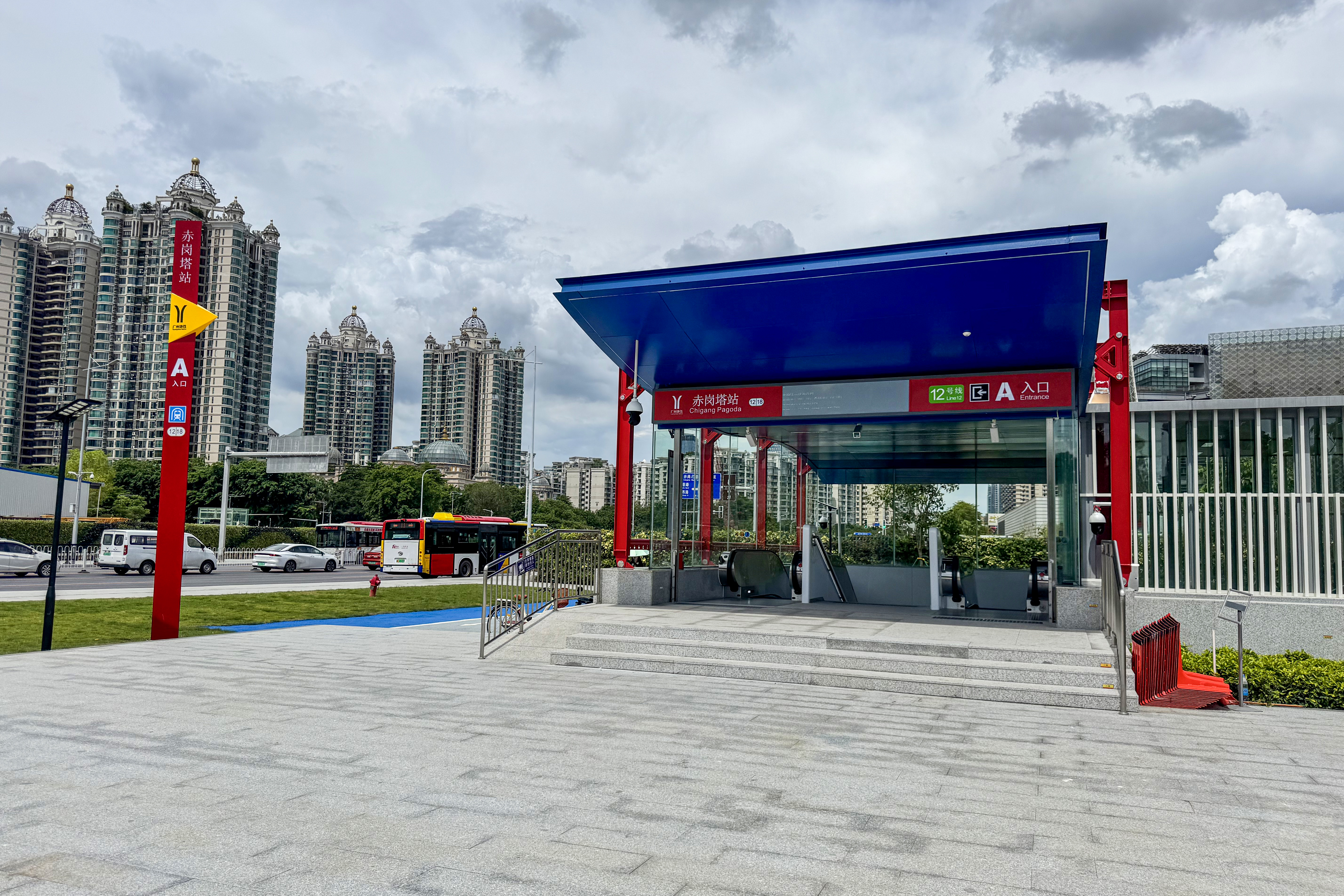
Entrance A

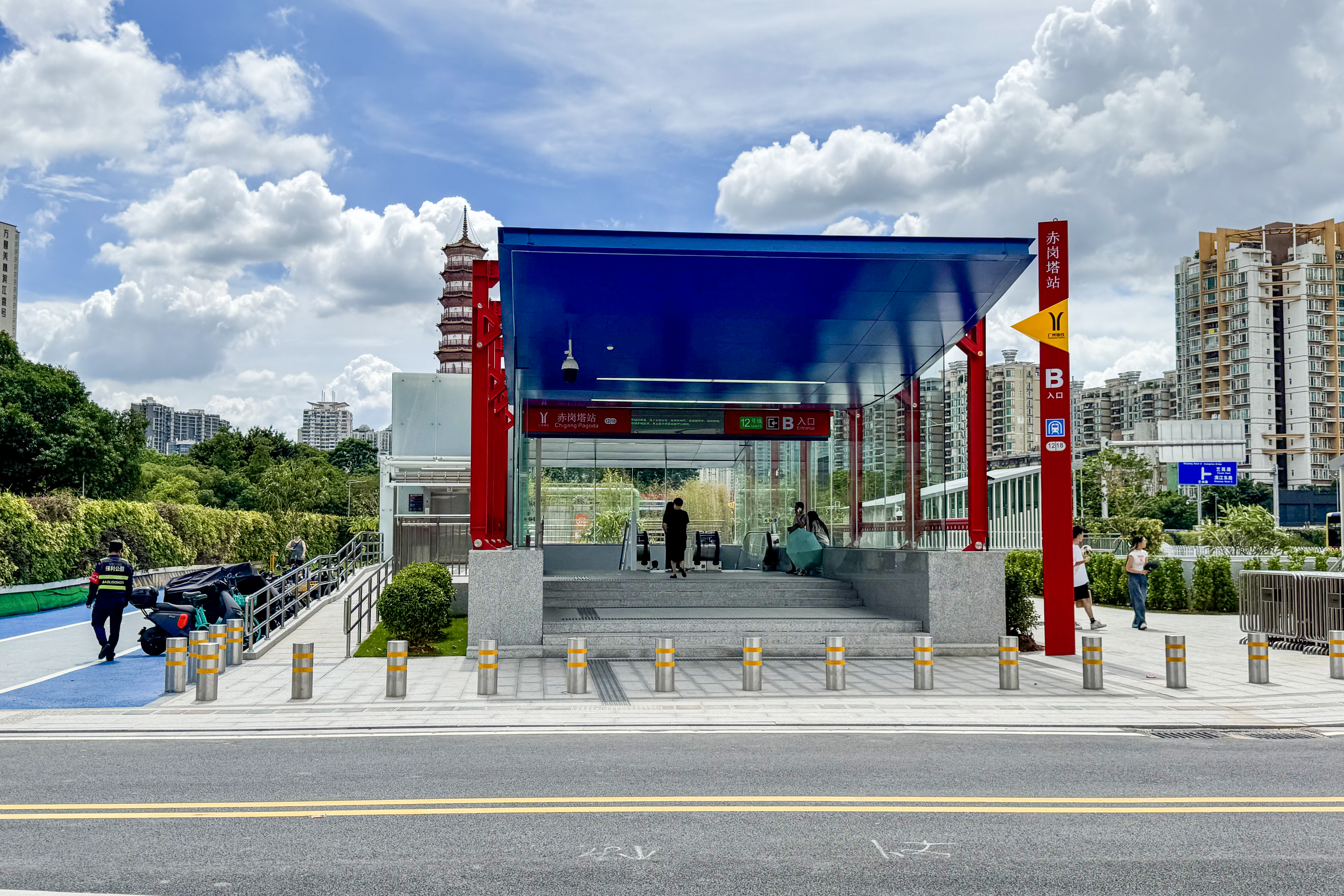
Entrance B

Entrance D

Elevator of Entrance D

== Usage ==
The station is adjacent to cultural attractions such as Canton Tower and Guangzhou Museum of Art, as well as commercial facilities such as Canton Tower Plaza. Therefore, after the opening of the station, it also attracted passengers to use the station to enter/exit and also diverted the flow of passengers in and out of Canton Tower station towards the northeast corner of this station. Before the station opening, the operator also mentioned that there will be more passengers entering and leaving the station during the summer travel period in 2025, and additional volunteers will be deployed at that time, as well as special personnel will be arranged to guide at key locations.

== History ==
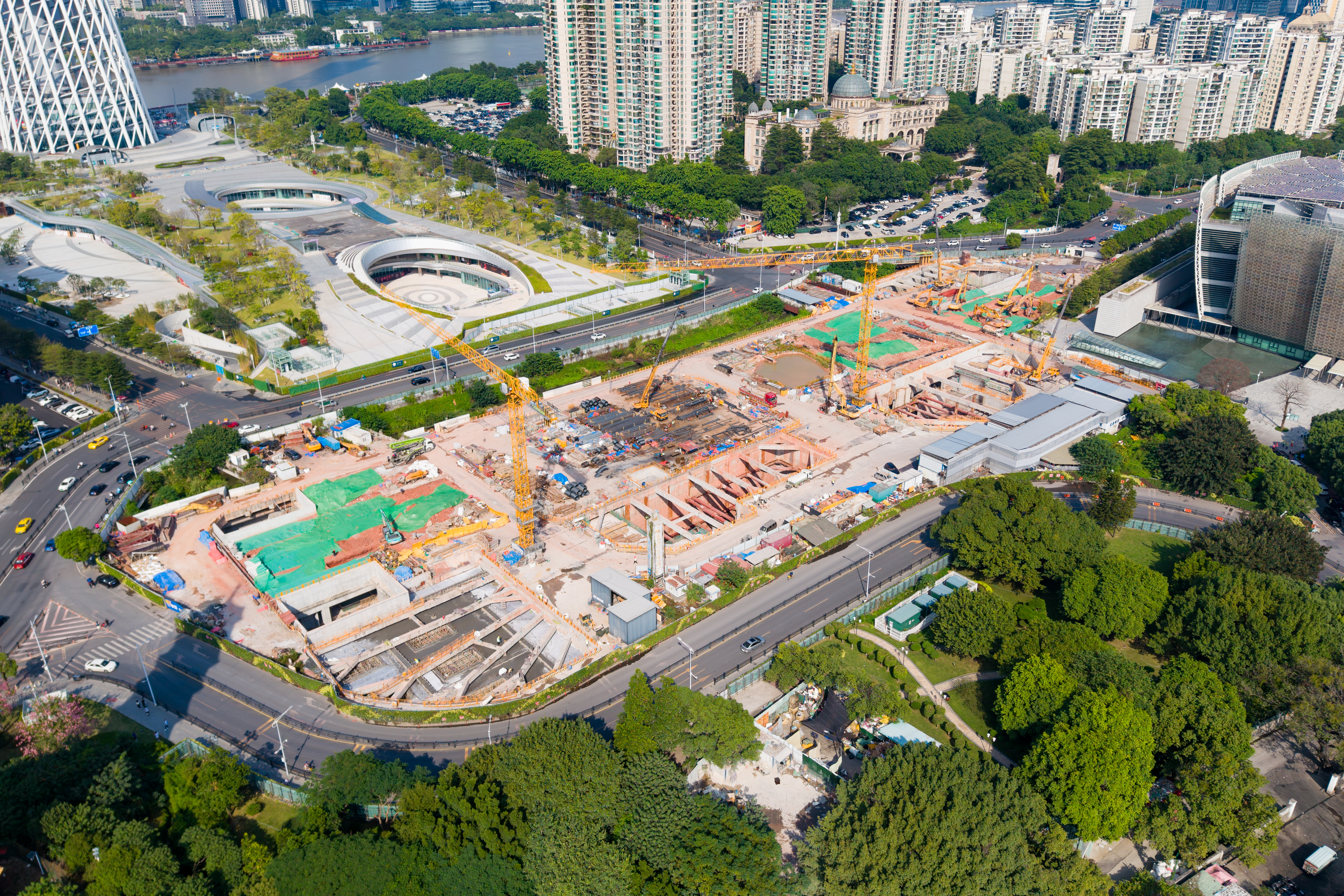
Construction site (October 2024)

In 2008, when Guangzhou solicited opinions on a new round of rail transit network planning plans, the new Line 8 of Plan A and Line 12 of Plan B were set up on the south side of the former Chigang Pagoda Station (now Canton Tower). In the 2010 plan, the lines of the above two schemes were adjusted to Line 12 and Line 19, which intersected at Chigang Pagoda Station and provide interchange with Line 3. In 2017, Line 12 was approved by the National Development and Reform Commission, and the construction of Lingnan Square station was implemented. Later, the line along the river in Haizhu District of Line 19 was changed to be used by the express Line 28, so the design of the station was revised and the connecting line between the two lines was cancelled. The transfer passage with Line 3 was also cancelled due to the excessive distance between stations and the high difficulty and safety risks associated with land acquisition and demolition for setting up transfer passages in this area.

In response to the construction of the station, the construction party began to enclose part of the green space of Canton Tower South Square in Chigang Pagoda Park from November 2019 to cooperate with the preliminary work of the station construction, then enclosed the section from the north side of the intersection of Youlin East Street on Yizhou Road to the north side of Chigang North Road from midnight on 30 May 2020. In April 2024, the station roof slab was sealed. The station completed the "three rights" transfer on 30 April 2025.

The open space between the station and the Canton Tower (now Canton Tower Plaza) was originally named "Lingnan Square", so the station was named Lingnan Square station during the planning and construction phase. In August 2024, the preliminary names of the stations on the east section of Line 12 were announced, and the station will be renamed Guangzhou Art Museum station according to the new Guangzhou Art Museum on the southeast side of the station. Since the name is only taken from the first of the planned "three museums and one venue", (Note: the new Guangzhou Museum, Guangzhou Art Museum (i.e. the Guangzhou Museum of Art), Guangzhou Science Museum and Lingnan Square (later renamed the Canton Tower Plaza)) and since Line 12 passes through the old art museum at Luhu Park and Guangdong Art Museum on Ersha Island, the naming scheme has sparked public discussion. There is also support for the use of the station name from the closer Canton Tower Plaza or Chigang Pagoda, which has a longer history. The Civil Affairs Bureau responded that the Canton Tower Plaza, which is a commercial building, cannot be used in the name of the station, but buildings such as Chigang Pagoda, Guangzhou Museum of Art, and Guangzhou Museum can be considered for inclusion in the scope of word adoption. Finally, in April 2025, the station was named Chigang Pagoda station. (Note: at the same time, it means that the name of Chigang Pagoda Station is "resurrected" in the Guangzhou Metro network, which is a first of its kind)

The station opened on 29 June 2025.

== Future development ==
=== Line 28 ===
The planned Line 28 will stop at this station, and after the line is opened, the reserved outer platforms of the station will be put into use.

The construction name of this station on this line is Yizhou Road station.

=== Line 20 ===
The planned Line 20 will have this station as its western terminus.

=== APM line ===
At present, although there is no stable extension plan for the APM line, the conditions for the APM line to pass through the station have been reserved during construction, and the location will be on the same floor as the Line 12 concourse.
