= Pazhou Pagoda =

Pagoda in Guangzhou, China

Coordinates: 23.10176°N 113.37027°E

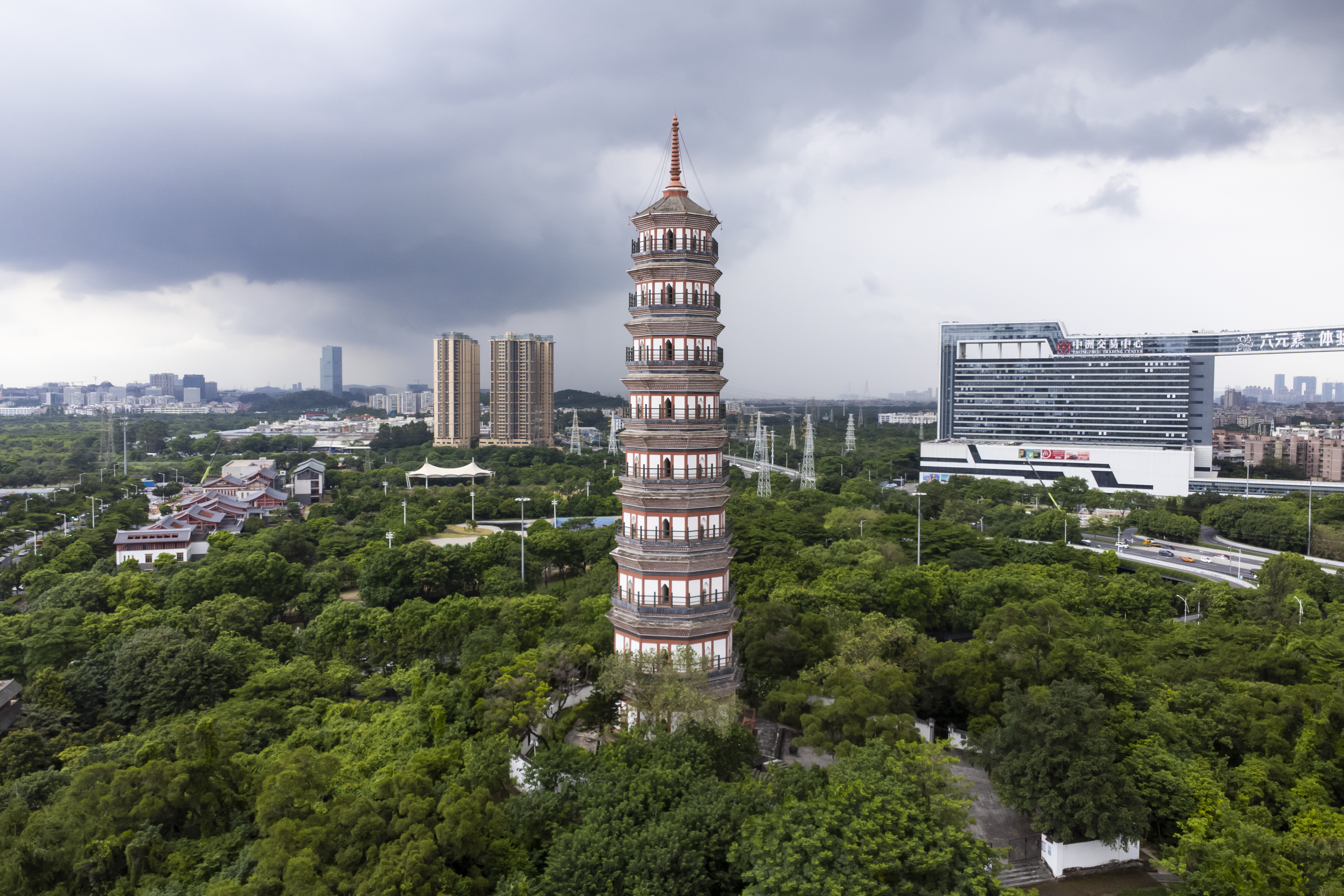
- Pazhou Pagoda in 2023
- Chinese: 琶洲塔
Transcriptions
Standard Mandarin
- Hanyu Pinyin: Pázhōutǎ
Yue: Cantonese
- Jyutping: Paa⁴zau¹ Taap³

The Pazhou Pagoda, also known as the Whampoa Pagoda or Pa Chow Pogoda, is an early modern Chinese pagoda on Pazhou Island in Haizhu District, Guangzhou, the capital of China's Guangdong Province.

== History ==
Construction of the Whampoa Pagoda was initiated in 1597 and was completely built by 1600. The pagoda is situated on a knoll at the south bank of Pearl River. Although it was built as a Buddhist landmark, it was also a useful navigation point for merchant ships traveling to Guangzhou.

== Architecture ==
It is an octagonal tower with 9 main sections and 17 sub sections. The tower stands at about 59 metres (194 ft), and has a diameter at the base of 12.7 metres (42 ft). It covers a total area of 111 square metres.

Functioning in a similar fashion to Chigang Pagoda, it was built for Fengshui and allow safe navigation of merchant ships traveling along the Pearl River towards Guangzhou.

== Gallery ==
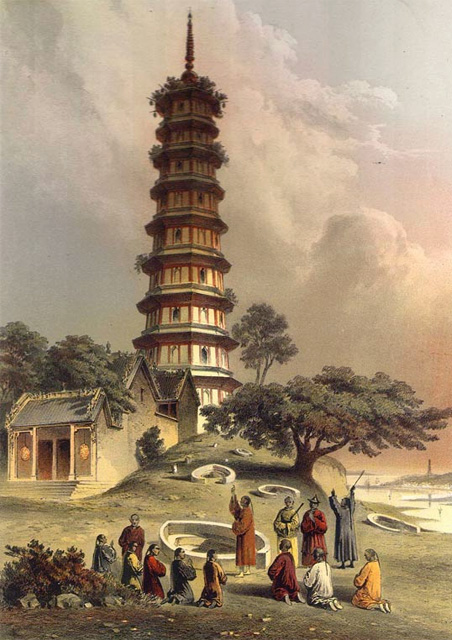
Pagoda at Whampoa by Wilhelm Heine, 1853

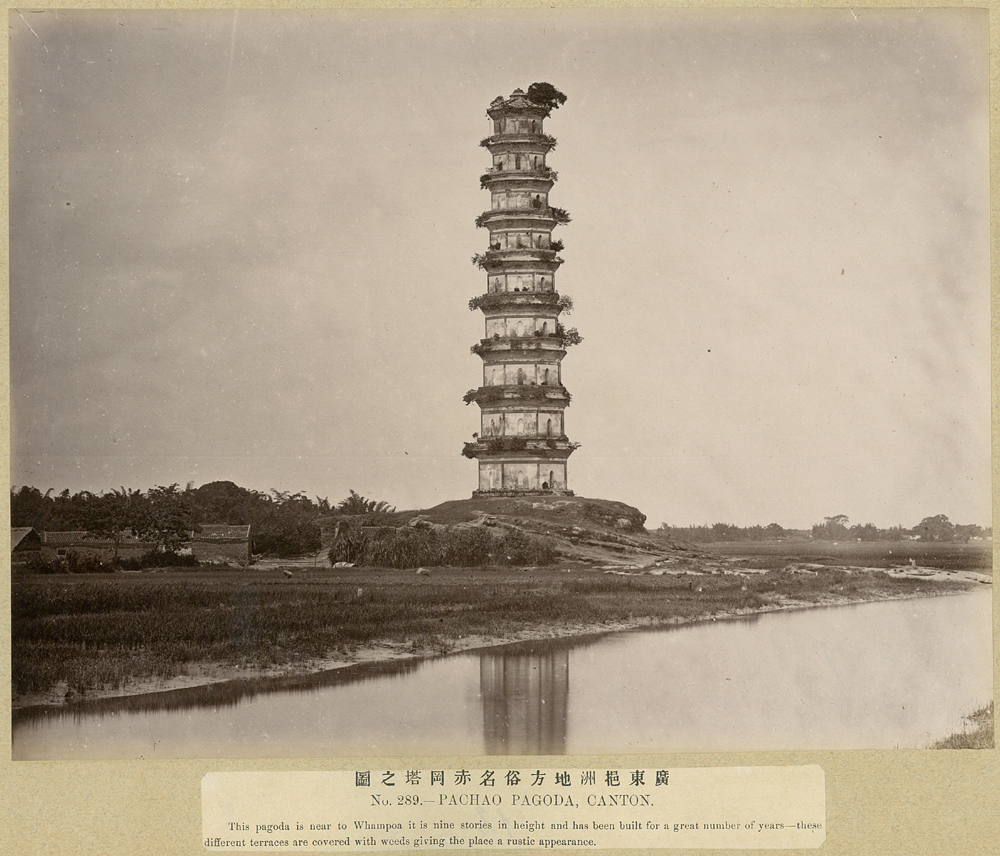
The Pagoda in 1880

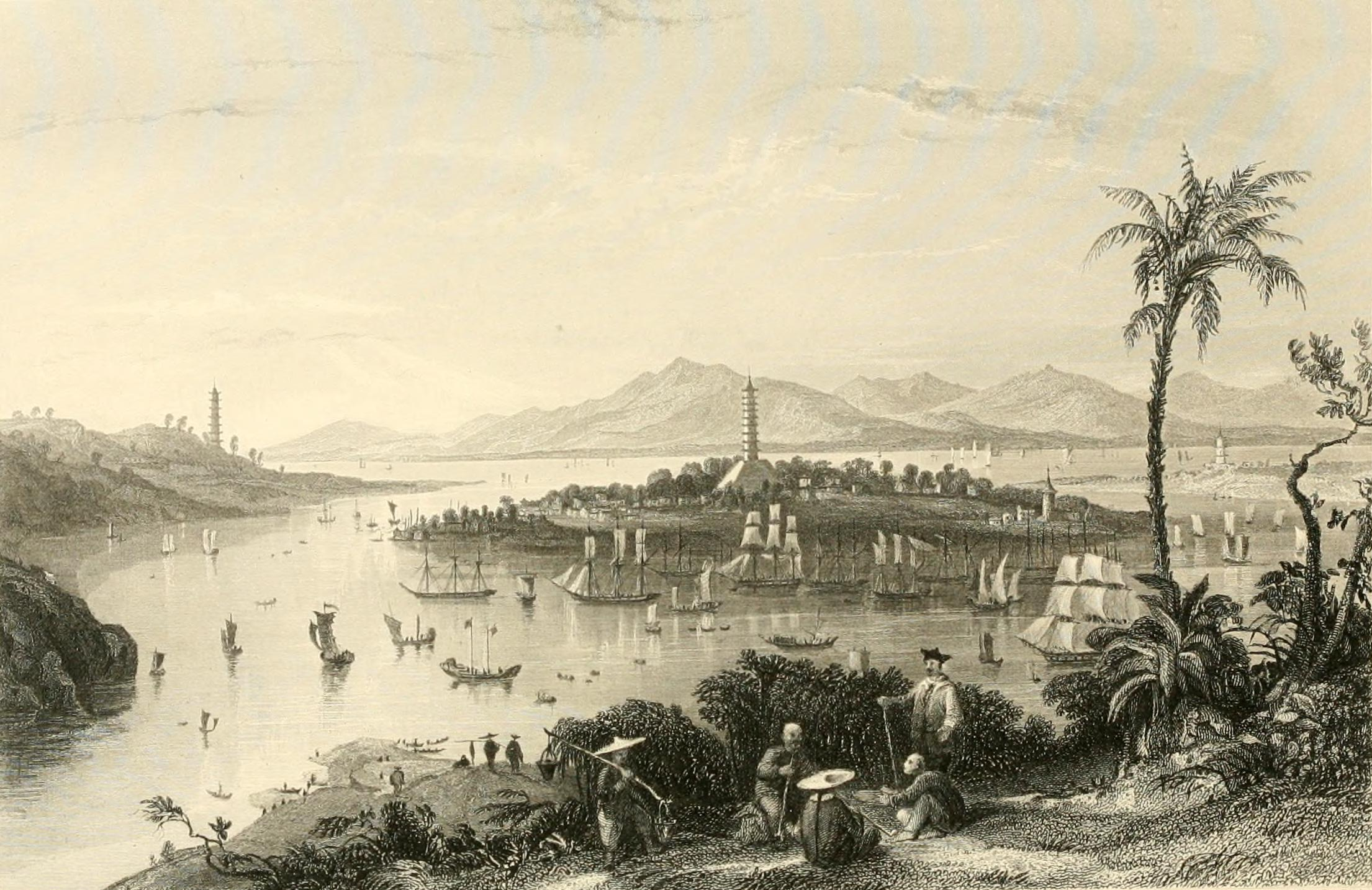
Drawing of the Pagoda and Changzhou Island, 1858
