= Chigang Pagoda =

Pagoda in Guangzhou, China

Coordinates: 23°6′15.6″N 113°19′2.3″E

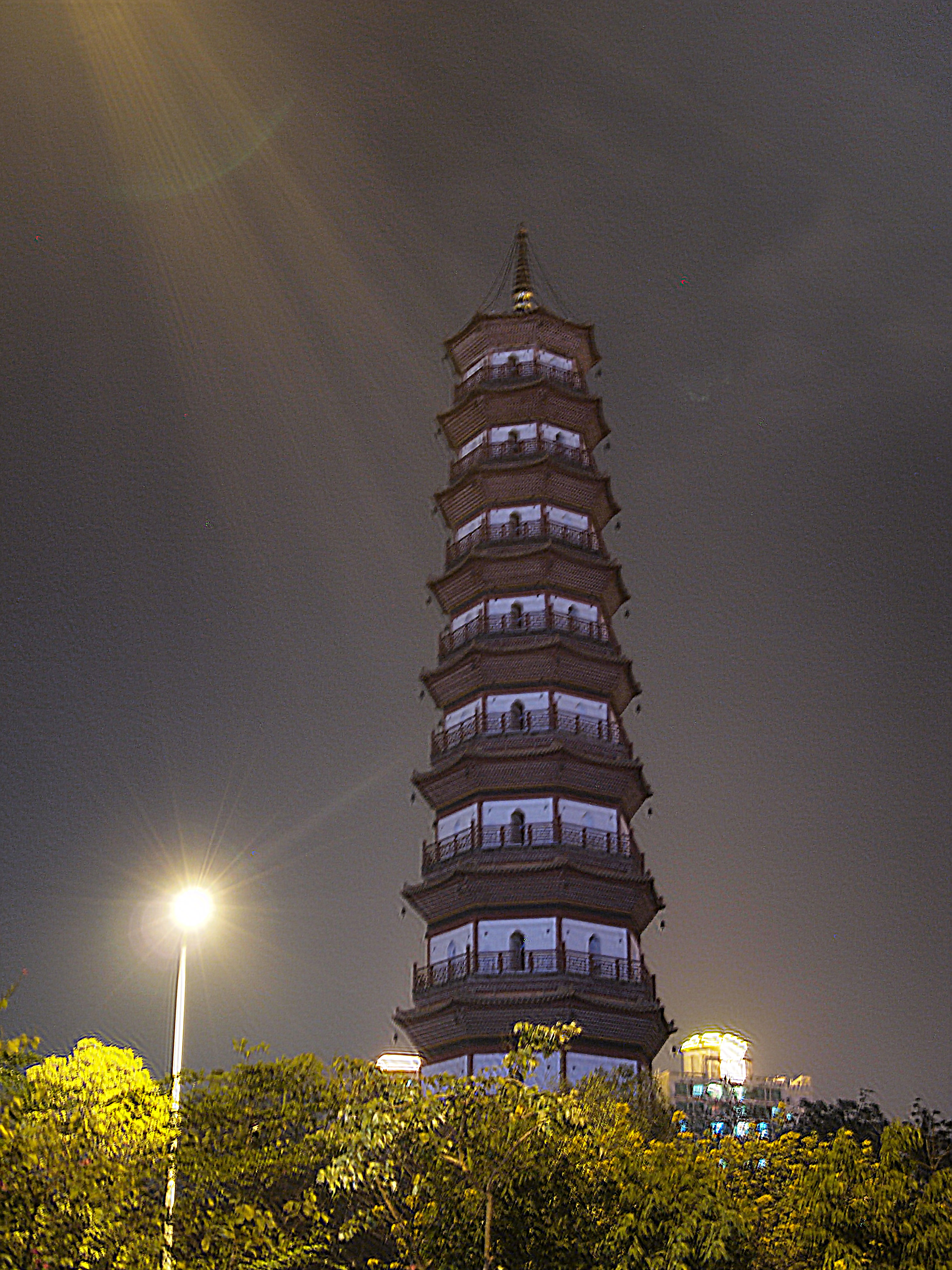
- Traditional Chinese: 赤崗塔
- Simplified Chinese: 赤岗塔
- Literal meaning: Red Stone Hill Pagoda
Transcriptions
Standard Mandarin
- Hanyu Pinyin: Chìgǎngtǎ
Yue: Cantonese
- Yale Romanization: Chekgōng Taap
- Jyutping: Cek³gong¹ Taap³

Chigang Pagoda, also known as the Red Stone Hill Pagoda or Honam Pogoda, is a famous pagoda located in Haizhu District, Guangzhou, China.

== History ==
Chigang Pagoda was built in 1619, during the reign of the Wanli Emperor of the Ming dynasty, at a time when fengshui influences were pervasive in Chinese architecture. Together with the Pazhou Pagoda (Whampoa Pagoda) and Lotus Pagoda, it is said that the three pagodas were built at the mouth of the Pearl River to bring good luck to Guangzhou and the surrounding area.

The building is made from red sandstone. The style of the Chigang Pagoda is influenced by the Ming dynasty architecture of the era. It was built to mirror the Pazhou Pagoda in the vicinity as well.

== Architecture ==
The pagoda is built in an octagonal shape. It stands 53.7 meters (176 ft) tall. The base has a diameter of 12.5 meters (41 ft). The pagoda has nine exterior floor sections. Inside the pagoda, it consist of 17 levels which keeps the nine sections together.

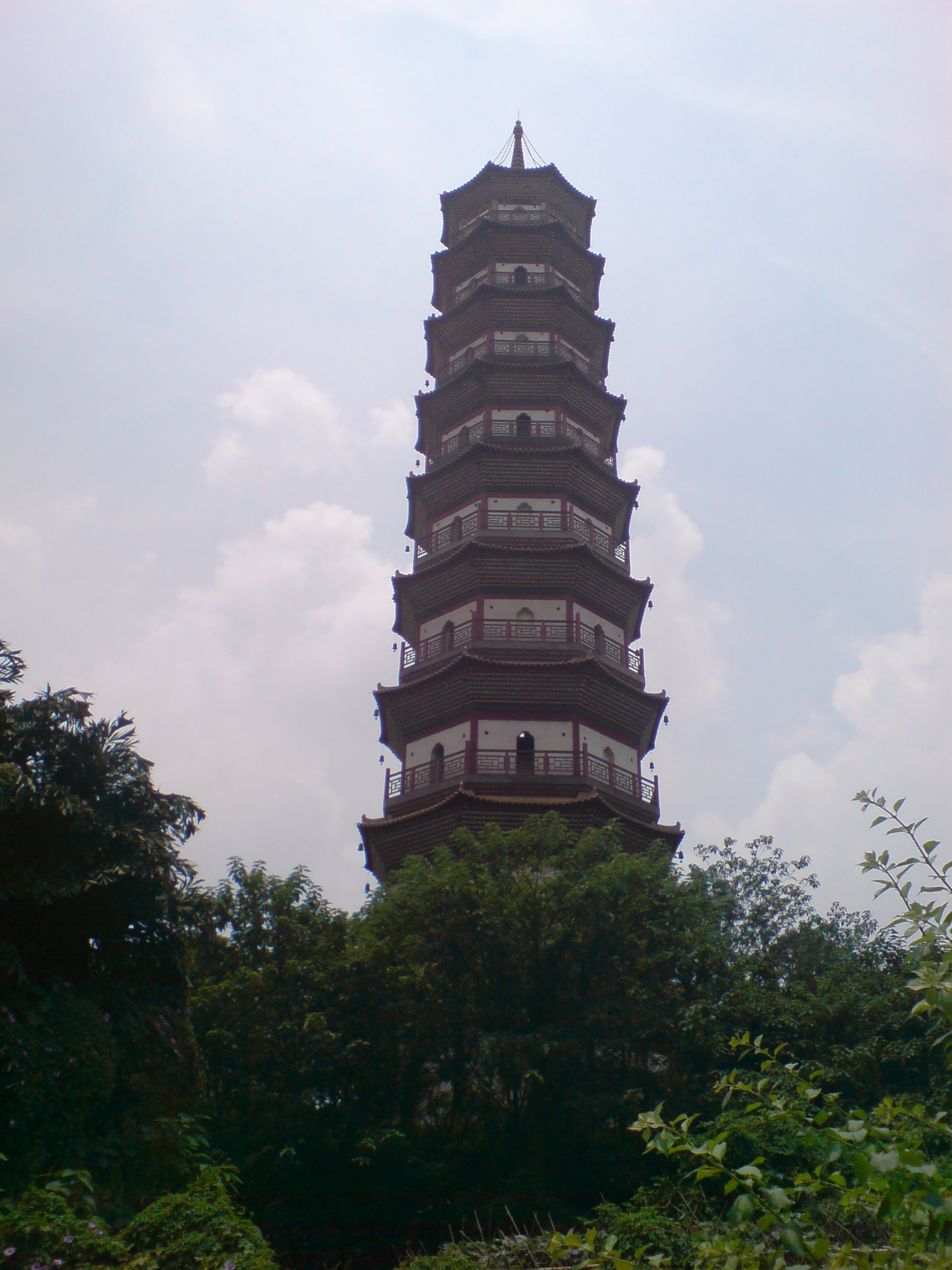
A close up picture of the pagoda.

== Restoration ==
Because of neglect and exposure to the elements over the centuries, the Chigang Pagoda deteriorated. The external wall cracked, the foundation started to sink, and the floors became uneven due to neglect. At one stage, the pagoda leaned about 1.05 m from the vertical.

In 1996 the Guangzhou authorities started work on its restoration, but this was never completed due to a lack of funds. In 1998 the Guangzhou Municipal Cultural Relics Management raised RMB 1.60 million to fund restoration of the Pagoda. The restoration and inspection was completed in mid-1999.

== Transport ==
The pagoda can be reached by metro. It is near Chigang Pagoda station on Line 12 and Canton Tower station on Line 3. However, the pagoda is not open to the public.
