= Guangdong Provincial Hospital of Chinese Medicine =

Guangdong Provincial Hospital of Chinese Medicine (Chinese: 廣東省中醫院)

Geography
- Location: Guangdong Province, Guizhou Province and Hainan Province, China

Organisation
- Type: public
- Affiliated university: Guangzhou University of Chinese Medicine

Services
- Standards: Grade A tertiary hospital
- Beds: 3,145

History
- Founded: 1933-8-14

Links
- Lists: Hospitals in China

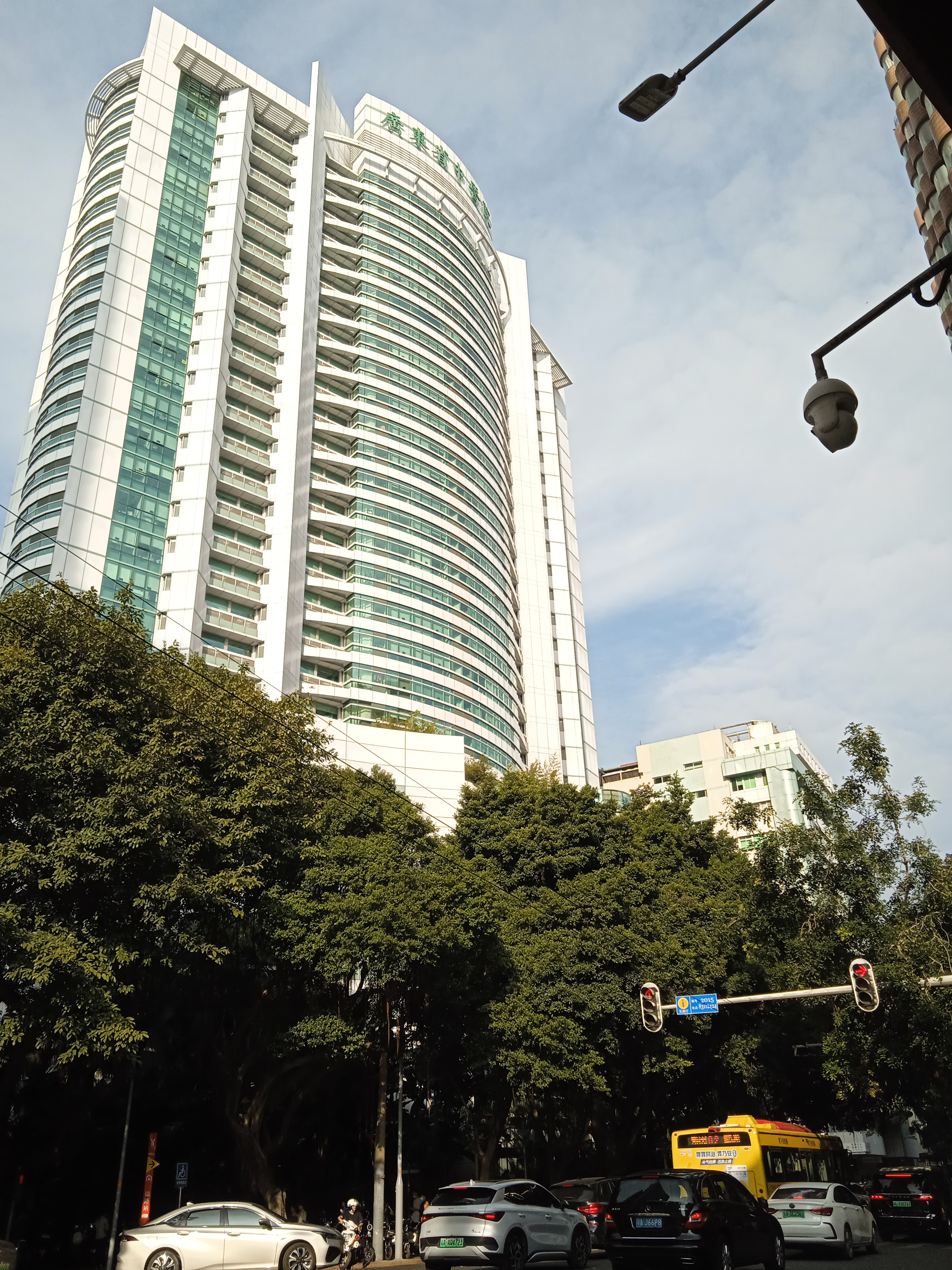
Dade Road Main Hospital

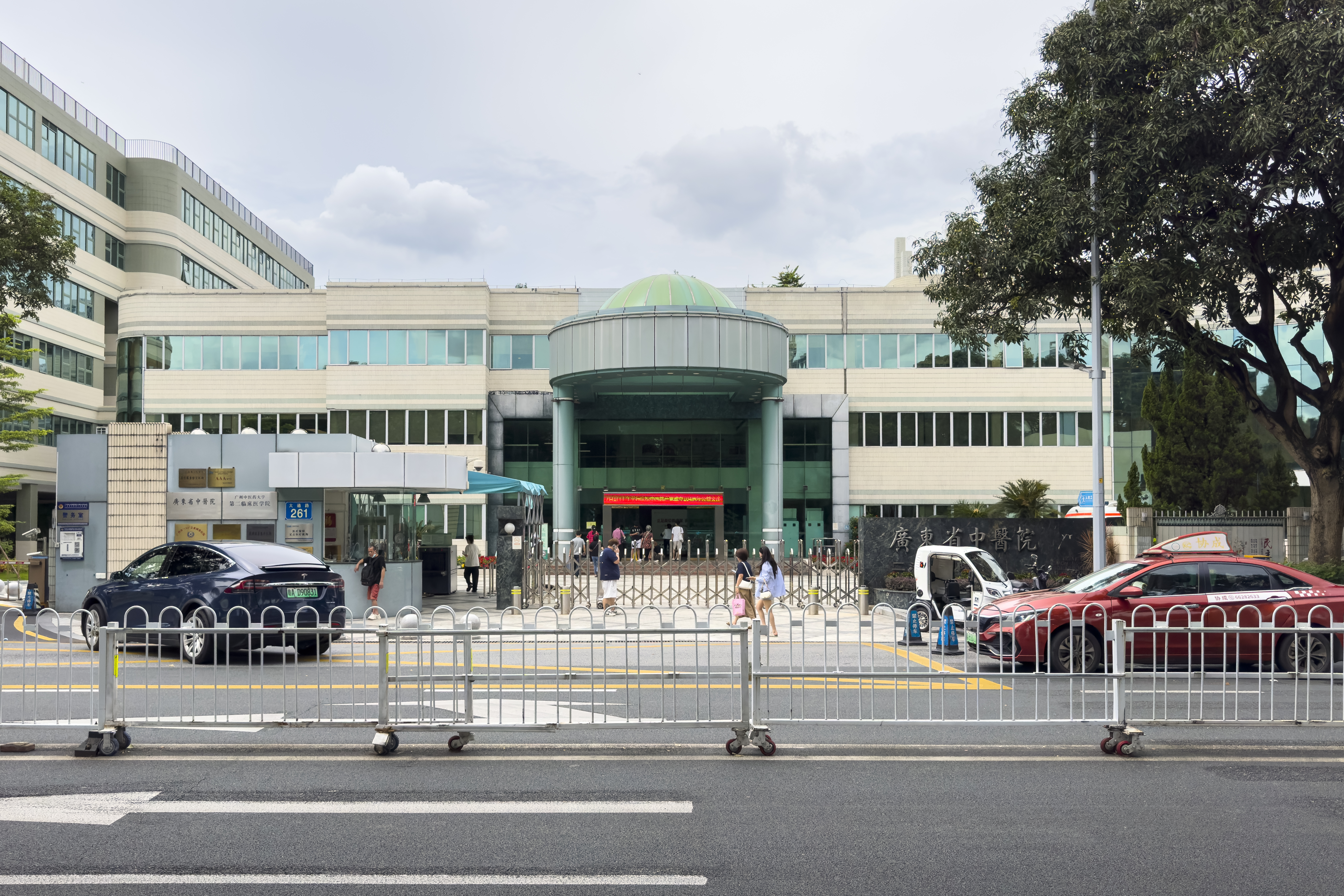
Ersha Island Hospital

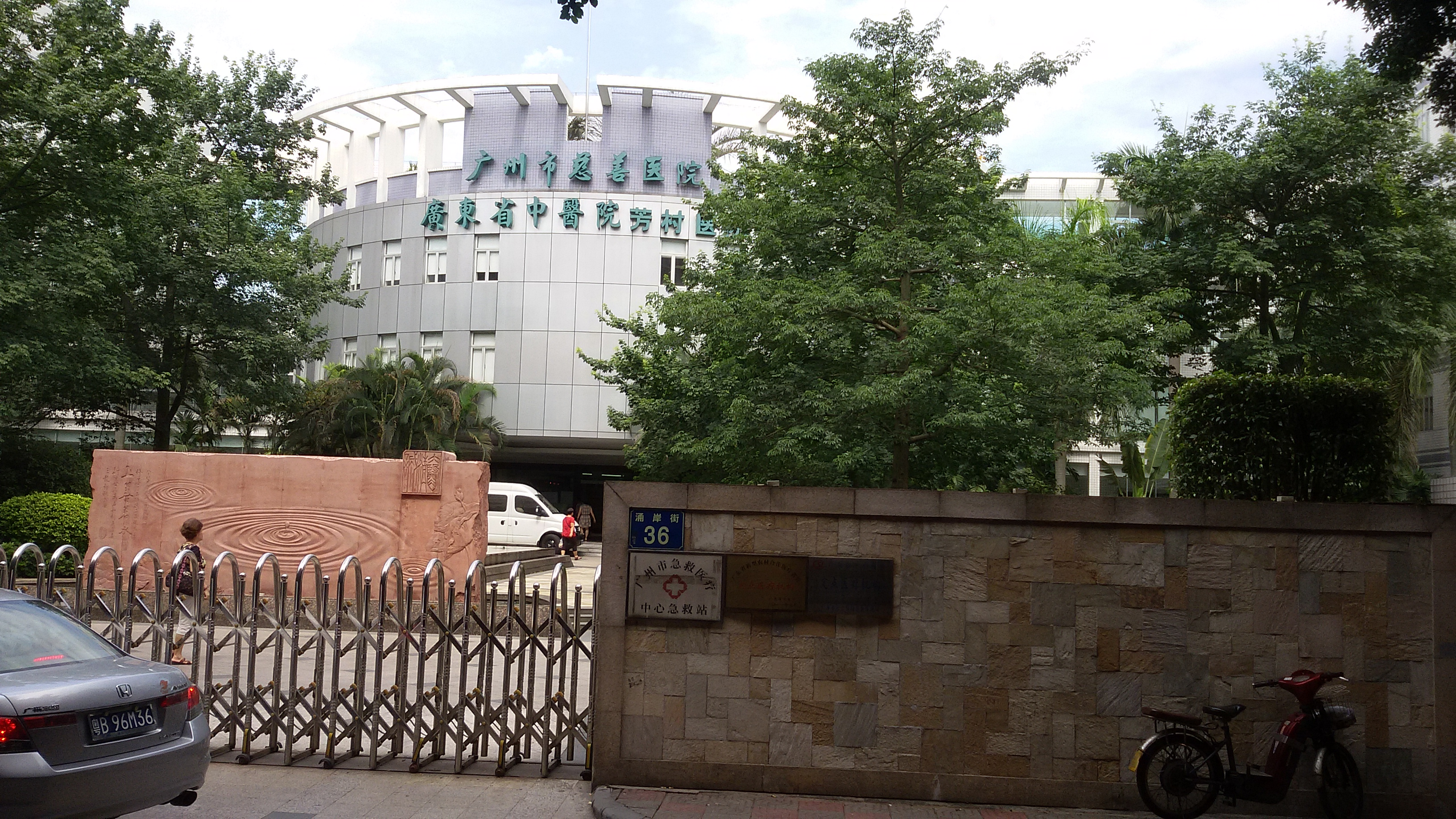
Fangcun Hospital

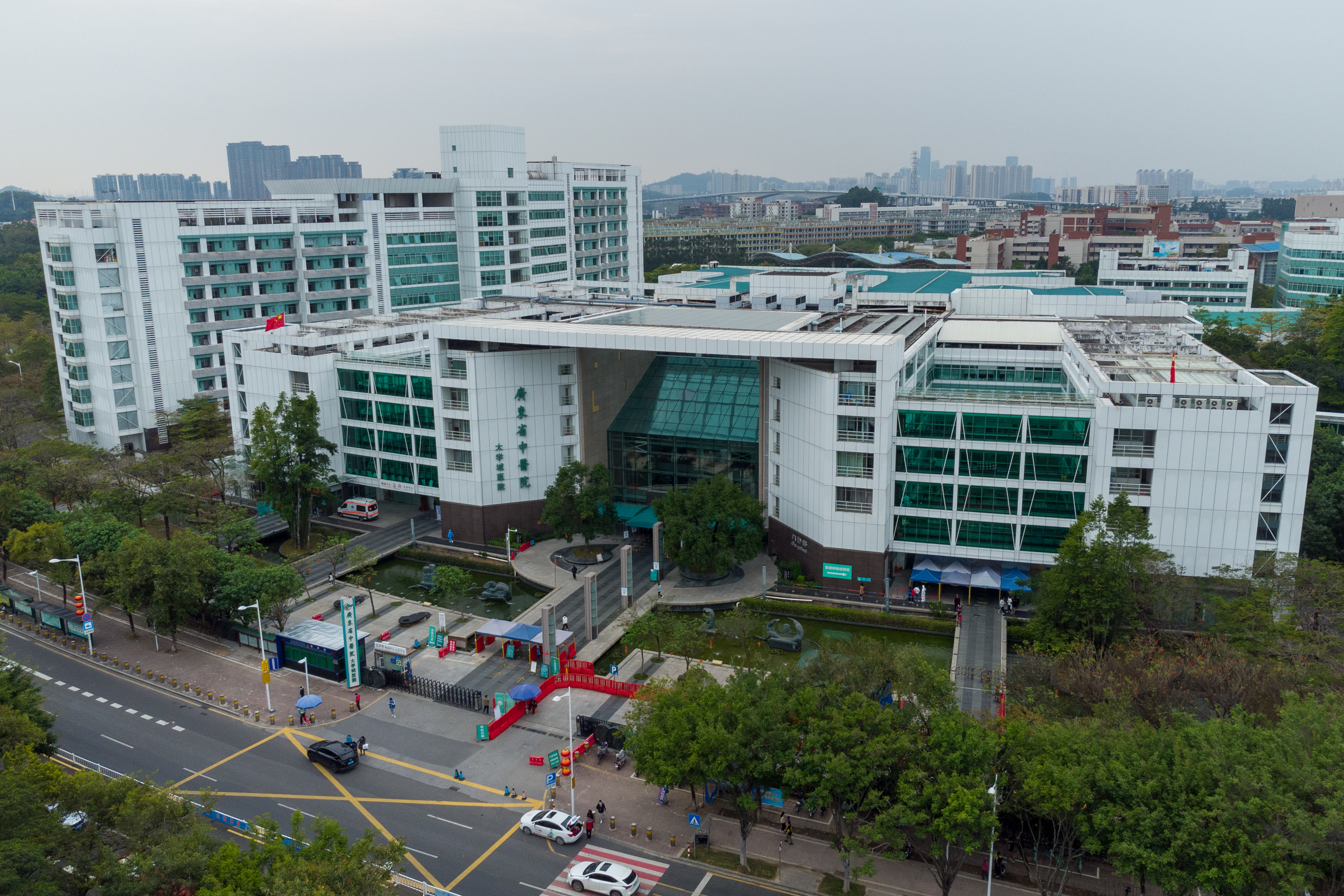
University Town Hospital

Guangdong Provincial Hospital of Chinese Medicine, also called the "Guangdong Provincial Hospital of Traditional Chinese Medicine" and "Guangdong Academy of Traditional Chinese Medicine", is a 3A hospital of Traditional Chinese Medicine (TCM) in Guangzhou, capital of Guangdong Province of China. Established in 1933 as one of the earliest Chinese medicine hospitals in modern Chinese history, the hospital has developed into a large hospital with a number of campuses, integrating medical treatment, education and research. Guangdong Provincial Hospital of Chinese Medicine ranks among the top TCM hospitals in the country.

== History ==
On September 15, 1924, the predecessor of Guangzhou University of Chinese Medicine, Guangdong Junior College of Traditional Chinese Medicine officially opened.

On August 14, 1933, the predecessor of Guangdong Provincial Hospital of Chinese Medicine, the "Affiliated Hospital of Guangdong Junor College of Traditional Chinese Medicine", was officially established and opened to the public. It was a three-story building.

In 1953, the Affiliated Hospital of Guangdong Junior College of Traditional Chinese Medicine was changed to a state-owned hospital, and was renamed "Guangdong Provincial Experimental Hospital of Chinese Medicine".

In 1956, Guangzhou College of Traditional Chinese Medicine (now Guangzhou University of Chinese Medicine) was established on the basis of the former Guangdong Junior College of Traditional Chinese Medicine, and the hospital became an affiliated hospital of Guangzhou College of Traditional Chinese Medicine.

In 1959, the hospital was renamed "Guangdong Provincial Hospital of Chinese Medicine".

On September 9, 1997, the Ersha Island Hospital officially opened. It was the first branch hospital of Guangdong Provincial Hospital of Chinese Medicine..

In September 2002, the Guangzhou Charity Association and Charity Service Center authorized Guangdong Provincial Hospital of Chinese Medicine to operate and manage the Guangzhou Charity Hospital (i.e., Fangcun Hospital) independently. In the same year, Zhuhai Traditional Chinese Medicine Hospital was merged into Guangdong Provincial Hospital of Traditional Chinese Medicine.

In 2007, the University Town Branch Hospital officially opened. In the same year, the Guangdong Academy of Traditional Chinese Medicine was officially established at the University Town Hospital.

In July 2018, Pazhou Hospital (Guangzhou United Family Hospital) opened. It was jointly built by Guangdong Provincial Hospital of Chinese Medicine and United Family Healthcare Group.

In January 2021, Doumen Hospital (Zhuhai Second Traditional Chinese Medicine Hospital, Zhuhai Doumen District Overseas Chinese Medicine Hospital) was entrusted to Guangdong Provincial Hospital of Chinese Medicine for management.

In, 2023, Guizhou Branch Hospital of Guangdong Provincial Hospital of Chinese Medicine opened in Guiyang. And Hainan Provincial Hospital of Chinese Medicine was renamed "Guangdong Provincial Hospital of Traditional Chinese Medicine (Hainan Branch)".

In 2025, the hospital was selected as a national Standardization Research and Transformation Center for Traditional Chinese Medicine. In the same year, the hospital was selected as a pilot medical institution to provide companion-free care services in Guangdong Province.

== Hospital Campuses ==
Guangdong Provincial Hospital of Chinese Medicine has a number of campuses, including

=== Guangzhou City ===
Dade Road Main Hospital: Located at No. 111, Dade Road, Yuexiu District, Guangzhou, Guangdong Province, China.

Ersha Island Hospital: No. 261, Datong Road, Ersha Island, Yuexiu District.

Fangcun Hospital (Guangzhou Charity Hospital): No. 36, Yong'an Street, Liwan District.

Guangzhou University Town Hospital: No. 55, West Ring Road, University Town, Panyu District.

Pazhou Hospital (Guangzhou United Family Hospital): No. 31, Pazhou Avenue, Haizhu District.

Nansha Hospital (under construction): Located in Nansha District.

=== Outside Guangzhou ===
Zhuhai Hospital (Zhuhai Municipal Hospital of Chinese Medicine ): Located at No. 53, Jingle Road, Xiangzhou District, Zhuhai.

Doumen Hospital (Zhuhai Second Traditional Chinese Medicine Hospital, Zhuhai Doumen District Overseas Chinese Traditional Chinese Medicine Hospital): No. 65, Lianqiao Road, Baijiao Town, Doumen District, Zhuhai City.

Guizhou Hospital (Guizhou University of Traditional Chinese Medicine Affiliated Guiyang Hospital, Guizhou Provincial Hospital of Traditional Chinese Medicine) Nanming Campus: Located in No. 27, Middle Section of Huaxi Avenue,Nanming District, Guiyang City, Guizhou Province.

== Other information ==
The other titles of Guangdong Provincial Hospital of Chinese Medicine include: the "Second Affiliated Hospital of Guangzhou University of Chinese Medicine", the "Second Clinical College of Guangzhou University of Chinese Medicine", "Guangdong Academy of Chinese Medical Sciences", and the "Guangdong Branch of China Academy of Chinese Medical Sciences".

The hospital hosts 22 key specialties commissioned by the State Administration of Traditional Chinese Medicine and 50 provincial key clinical specialties. There are over 3,000 beds and more than 7,000 employees, including one academician, one national master of traditional Chinese medicine, and two nationally renowned traditional Chinese medicine practitioners. The number of patients served annually has ranked first among all TCM hospitals in China for more than 20 consecutive years.

The Hospital offers education programs for bachelor, master and PhD degrees. There are four undergraduate majors: Chinese Medicine, Clinical Medicine, Medical Laboratory Technology, and Orthopedics of Chinese Medicine.

The hospital published 37 papers listed in Nature Index for the Time frame of 1 February 2025 - 31 January 2026, ranking 419th globally and 159th in China.

Guangdong Provincial Hospital of Chinese Medicine ranked 2nd in the Ranking of Comprehensive Influence of Traditional Chinese Medicine Hospitals in China in 2024.

The hospital has cooperation with medical institutions in many countries and regions, including the United States, Japan, South Korea, Italy, and Hong Kong. It also has established a Joint Research Base for Chinese medicine with Karolinska Institute in Sweden. And there is one Traditional Chinese Medicine International Science and Technology Cooperation Base.

Health care vouchers issued by the Hong Kong Government are acceptable to Guangdong Provincial Hospital of Chinese Medicine (Dade Road Hospital).

== See also ==
- Guangzhou University of Chinese Medicine
