= Higher Education Mega Center North station =

Guangzhou Metro station

Higher Education Mega Center North 大学城北
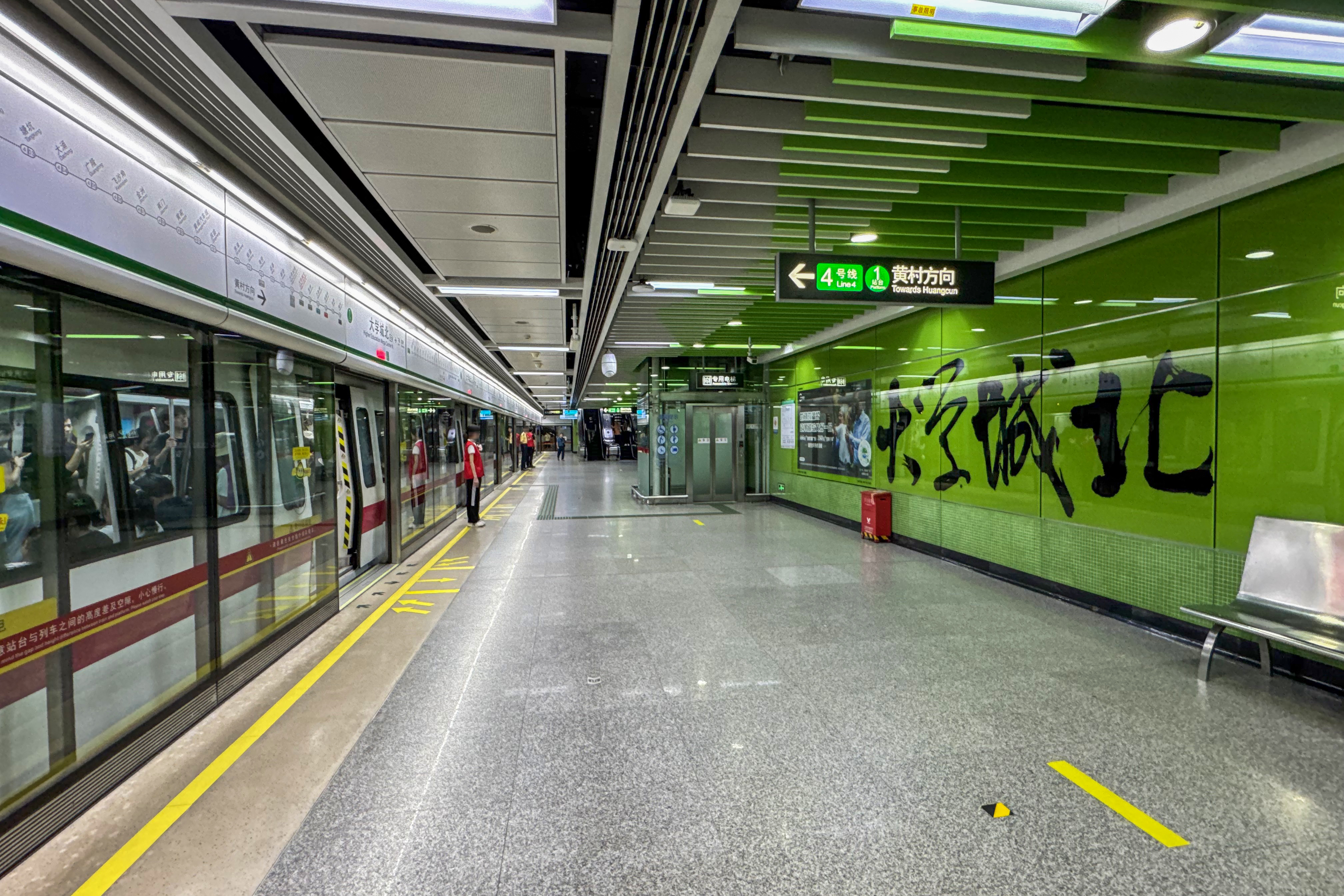
- Line 4 Platform 1 (towards Huangcun)

Chinese name
- Simplified Chinese: 大学城北站
- Traditional Chinese: 大學城北站
- Literal meaning: University City North Station
Transcriptions
Standard Mandarin
- Hanyu Pinyin: Dàxuéchéng Běi Zhàn
Yue: Cantonese
- Yale Romanization: Daaihhohksìhng Bāk Jaahm
- Jyutping: Daai^{6}hok^{6}sing^{4} Bak^{1} Zaam^{6}

General information
- Location: Guangzhou Higher Education Mega Center Main North Street and Central Road Intersection; Xiaoguwei, Panyu District, Guangzhou, Guangdong; China
- Coordinates: 23°03′28″N 113°23′08″E
- Operator: Guangzhou Metro Co. Ltd.
- Lines: Line 4; Line 12
- Platforms: 7 (3 island platforms and 1 side platform)
- Tracks: 5

Construction
- Structure type: Underground
- Accessible: Yes

Other information
- Station code: 419 1224

History
- Opened: Line 4: 26 December 2005 (20 years ago); Line 12: 29 June 2025 (14 months ago)
- Former names: Beiting (北亭) (2005-May 2006)

Services
Preceding station	Guangzhou Metro	Following station
Guanzhou towards Huangcun	Line 4	Higher Education Mega Center South towards Nansha Passenger Port
Guanzhou towards Ersha Island	Line 12 East section	Higher Education Mega Center South Terminus
Location

Higher Education Mega Center North Station (simplified Chinese: 大学城北站; traditional Chinese: 大學城北站; Cantonese Yale: Daaihhohksìhng Bāk Jaahm) is an interchange station between Line 4 and Line 12 of the Guangzhou Metro. The Line 4 station started operations on 26 December 2005. It is located at the underground of the north of Guangzhou Higher Education Mega Center, located on Xiaoguwei Island in Xiaoguwei Subdistrict in Guangzhou's Panyu District. The station became an interchange station when Line 12 started operations on 29 June 2025.

The station was previously called Beiting Station (北亭站; Bāktìhng Jaahm) because of nearby Beiting Village (北亭村) on the island before changing its name to the current name in May 2006.

== Station layout ==
The station has two parallel stations for Line 4 and Line 12 connected by transfer interfaces. The ground level is the exit, and it is surrounded by Higher Education Mega Center Main North Street, Central Road East, Guanzhou tunnel, Panyu District Computing Science and Big Data Industrial Park and other nearby buildings.

=== Line 4 ===
The Line 4 station is a two-storey underground station. The ground level is the exit, the first floor is the concourse, and the second floor are the platforms for Line 4.

G	-	Exits D, E1, E2
L1; Concourse	4 Lobby	Ticket Machines, Customer Service, Shops, Police Station, Security Facilities
L2; Platforms	Platform 2	4 towards Nansha Passenger Port (Higher Education Mega Center South)
L2; Platforms	Island platform, doors will open on the left
L2; Platforms	Platform	For emergency use only
L2; Platforms	Platform 1	4 towards Huangcun (Guanzhou)
L2; Platforms	Side platform, doors will open on the right

=== Line 12 ===
The Line 12 station is a three-storey underground station. The ground level is the exit, the first floor is the concourse, and the second and third floors are the platforms for Line 12.

G	-	Exits A, B, C, F
L1; Concourse	12 Lobby	Ticket Machines, Customer Service, Security Facilities
L2; Platforms	Platform 3	12 towards Higher Education Mega Center South (terminus)
L2; Platforms	Island platform, doors will open on the right (Toilets, Nursery)
L2; Platforms		Reserved for 12 branch (enclosed)
L3; Platforms	Platform 4	12 towards Ersha Island (Guanzhou)
L3; Platforms	Island platform, doors will open on the left (Toilets, Nursery)
L3; Platforms		Reserved for 12 branch (enclosed)

=== Concourse and transfer method ===
The station is divided into two parts, Line 4 and Line 12, both of which are located on the first floor. Both concourses are connected by a liaison interface between the paid and non-paid areas. In order to facilitate pedestrian entry and exit and transfer, the north and south sides of the station hall level are divided into paid areas.

There are four escalators in each of the two paid areas of the Line 4 concourse for passengers to go to platforms in different directions. Since the two dedicated elevators leading to different platforms are located in the unpaid area in the middle of the station hall, passengers need to ask the station staff for assistance when using them. The paid area of Line 12 is equipped with escalators and stairs to facilitate passengers to reach platforms in different directions, as well as a dedicated elevator that runs through three floors.

The concourse of the Line 4 and 12 stations are equipped with electronic ticket vending machines and AI customer service centers. Convenience stores and snack stores, as well as self-service facilities such as vending machines, charging machines and luggage lockers are also available for passengers. An automated external defibrillator is located next to the station control center.

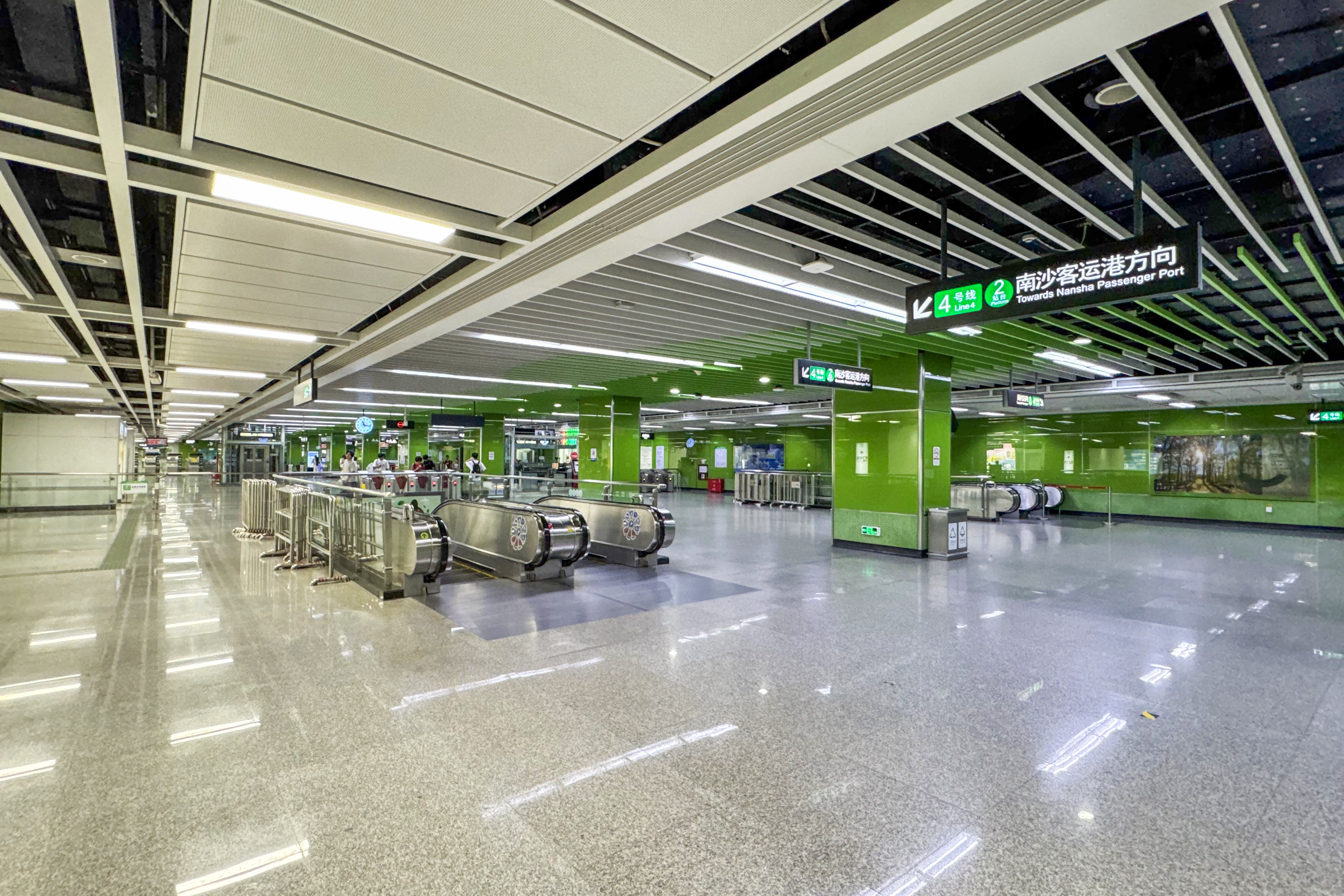
Line 4 concourse

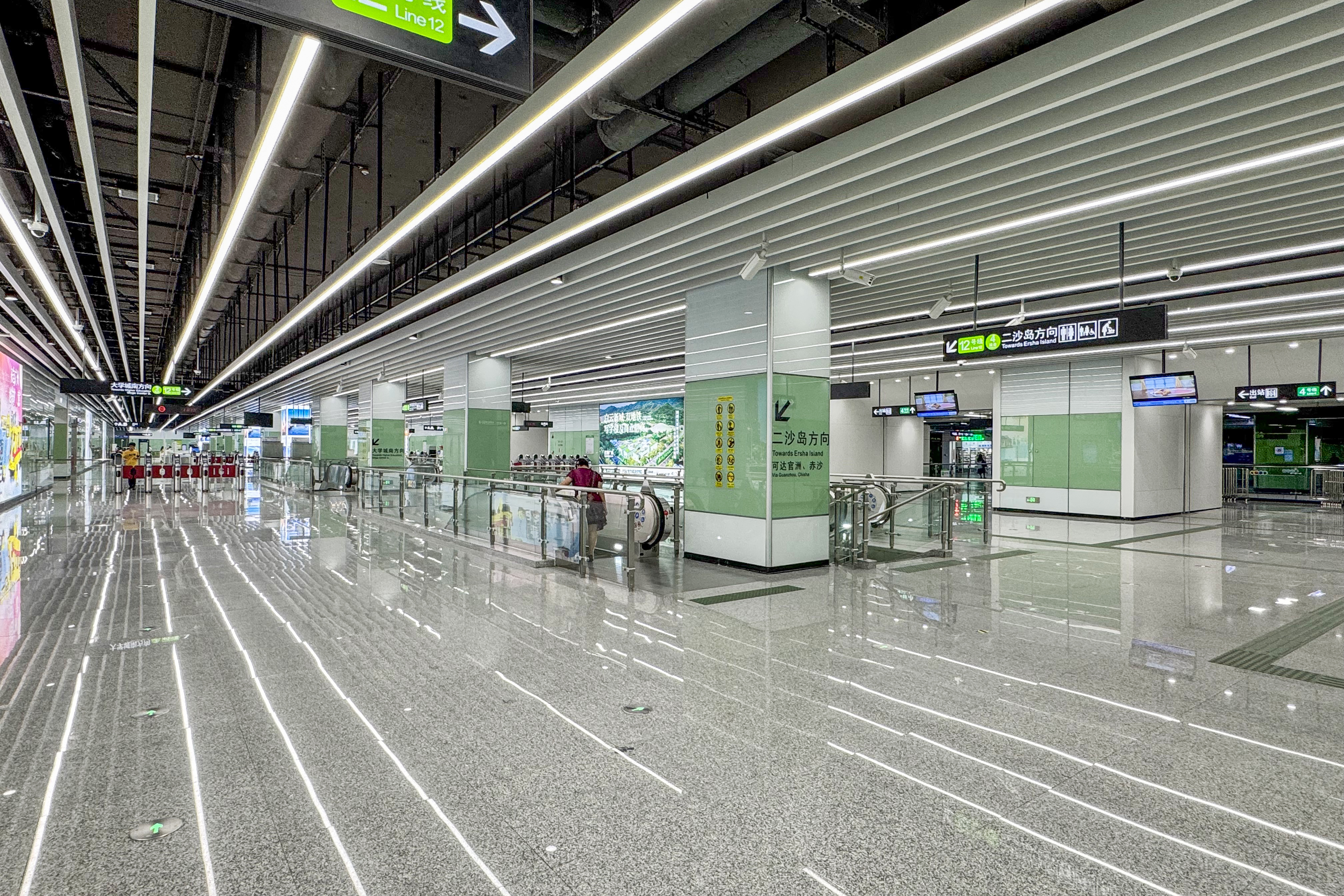
Line 12 concourse

=== Platforms ===
Line 4 has an island platform and a side platform, and Line 12 has a set of stacked island platforms, both of which are located under Higher Education Mega Center Main North Street.

The calligraphy station name of Platform 1 on Line 4 is the handwritten pen of Lin Zhenwu, then secretary general of the Guangzhou Young Calligraphers Association.

Initially, Line 12 will use platforms 3 and 4 on the northeast side, while the platforms on the southwest side reserved for Line 12 will be closed by glass walls until the completion of Line 12 branch. Therefore, in the eyes of passengers, Line 12 of this station has a set of side platforms.

Toilets and a nursery room are located at the Higher Education Mega Center South end of the Line 12 platforms.

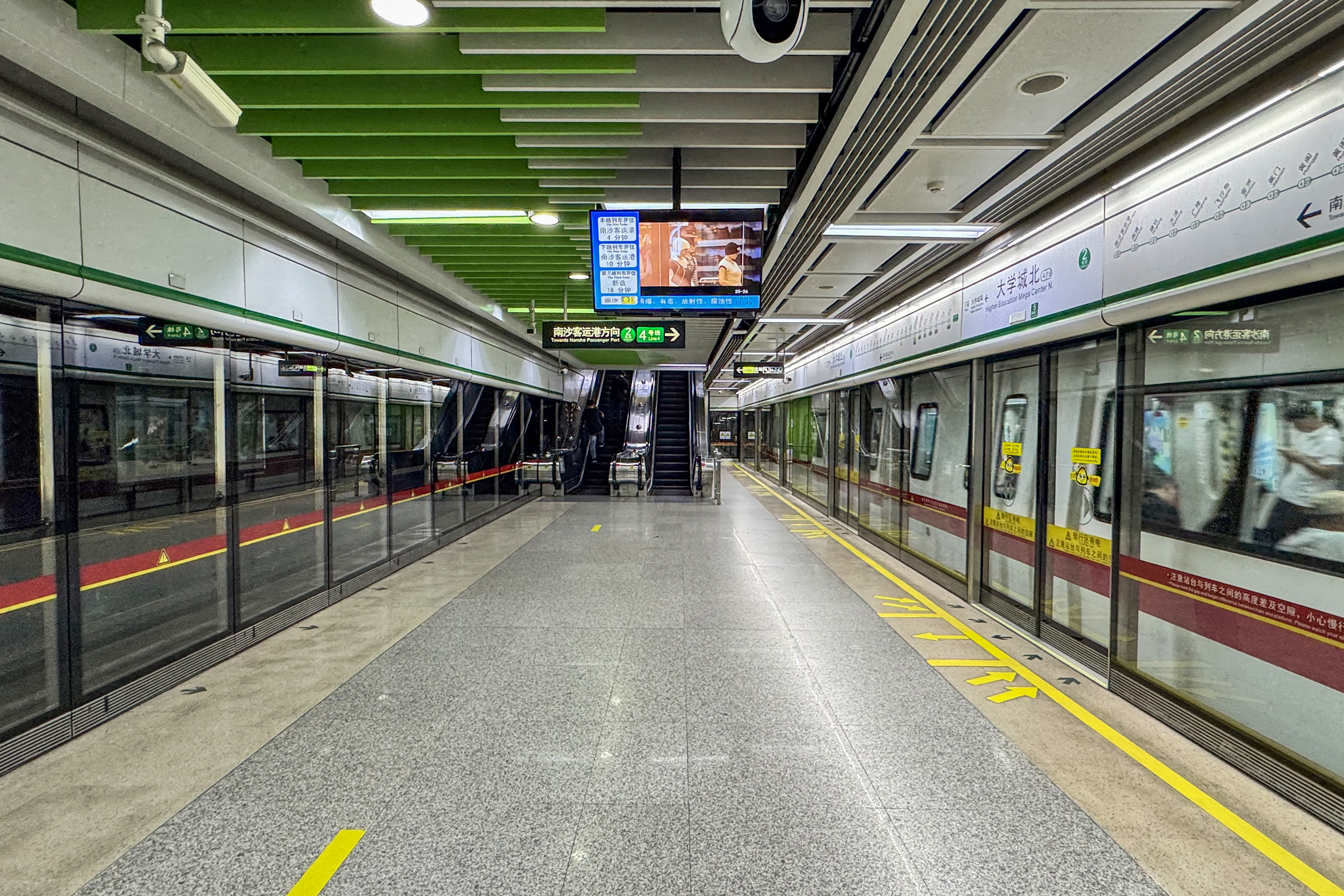
Line 4 platform

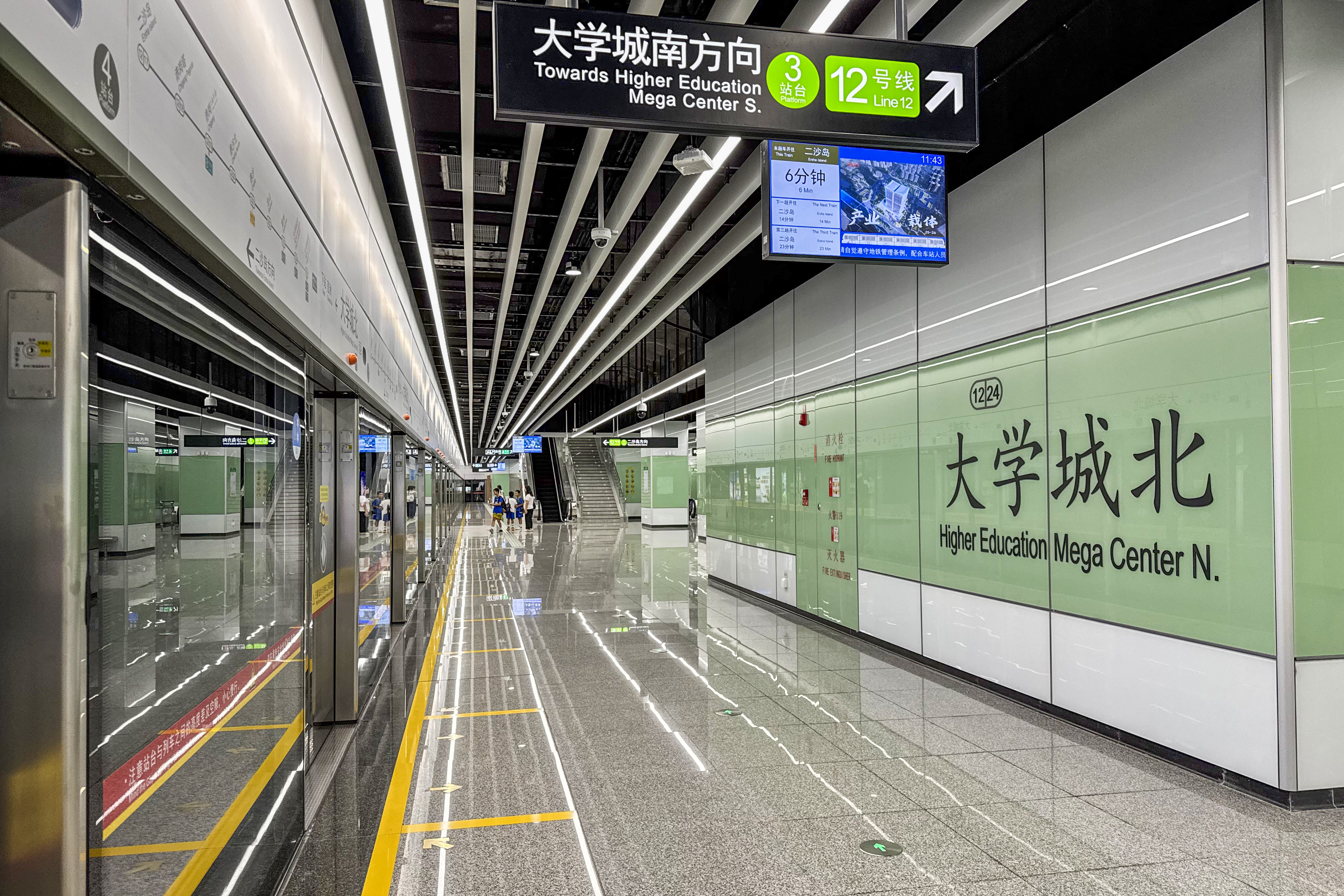
Line 12 platform 4

==== Track configuration ====
Line 4 of this station has a storage line that runs through the station. Although the island platform has a parking line (the emergency evacuation platform, which is opposite Platform 2) equipped with shield doors, the emergency evacuation platform is not equipped with any sliding doors, but only a few push doors are installed because pillars, escalators and elevators block the location of some doors. When a train has an emergency situation and needs to enter the parking line of the station for evacuation, passengers need to push the push door to enter the platform for evacuation after the train stops.

A bifurcated track is reserved at the north end of the two-storey Line 12 platform for the future branch line of Line 12 to connect the tracks.

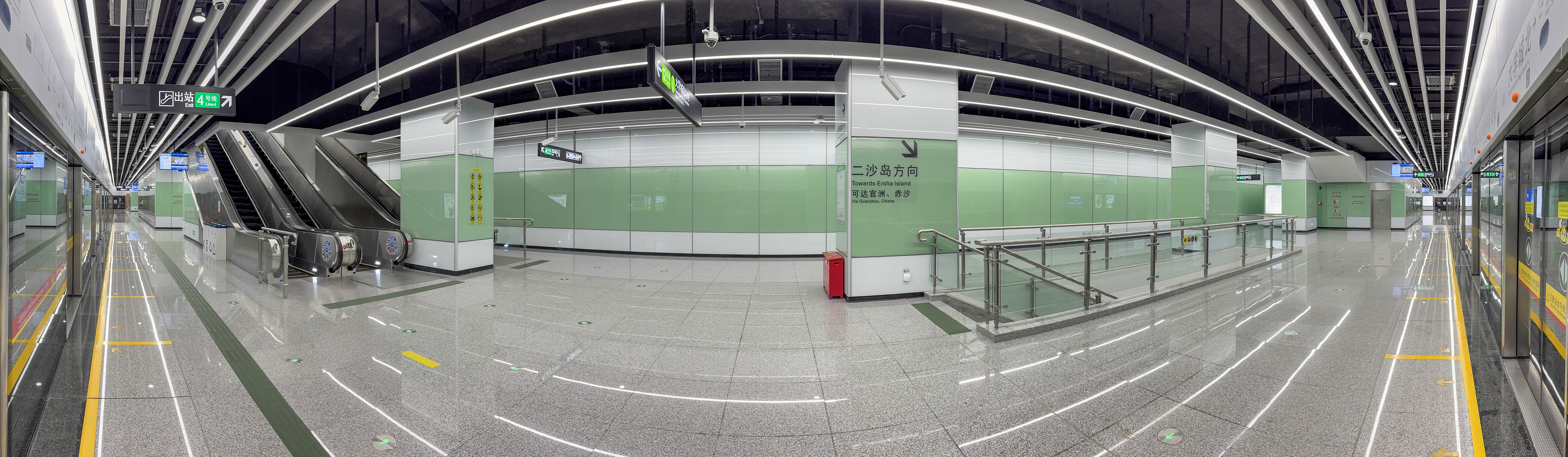
Line 12 platform 3 panorama

=== Entrances/exits ===
The station has 6 points of entry/exit. When the station first opened with Line 4, there were only 4 exits, lettered from A to D, of which Exits A to C were successively dismantled due to the construction needs of Line 12. However, in order to meet the requirements of fire evacuation, before the three entrances/exits were removed, Exits E1 and E2 were added to the east side of the station.

Exits A, B and C of the Line 12 station have been reconstructed and new Exit F was added, of which the three Exits B, C, and F are connected to the Computing Science and Big Data Industrial Park on the west side of the station in the form of passages. Exits A, B and F opened in tandem with the Line 12 station, and the opening of Exit C was postponed.

- A: Jingning Street, South China Normal University, Xinghai Conservatory of Music
- B: Central Ring West Road, South China Normal University, Xinghai Conservatory of Music
- ~~C~~: (Under construction)
- D: Central North Street, Sun Yat-sen University Campus
- E1: Central North Street, Guangdong Provincial Hospital of Traditional Chinese Medicine
- E2: Qinglan Street
- F: Qinglan Street

Exit F is equipped with an elevator.

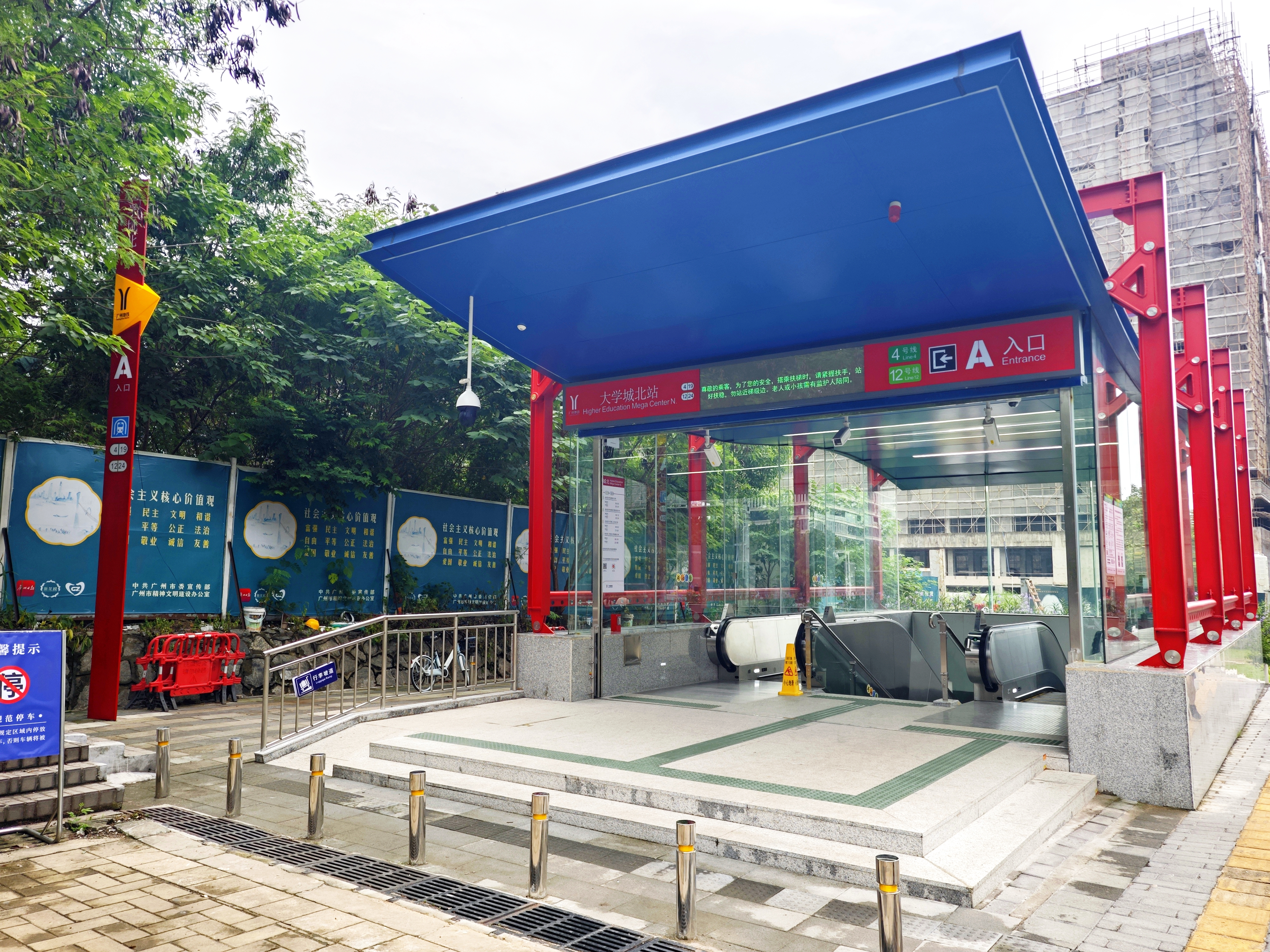
Entrance A

Entrance B

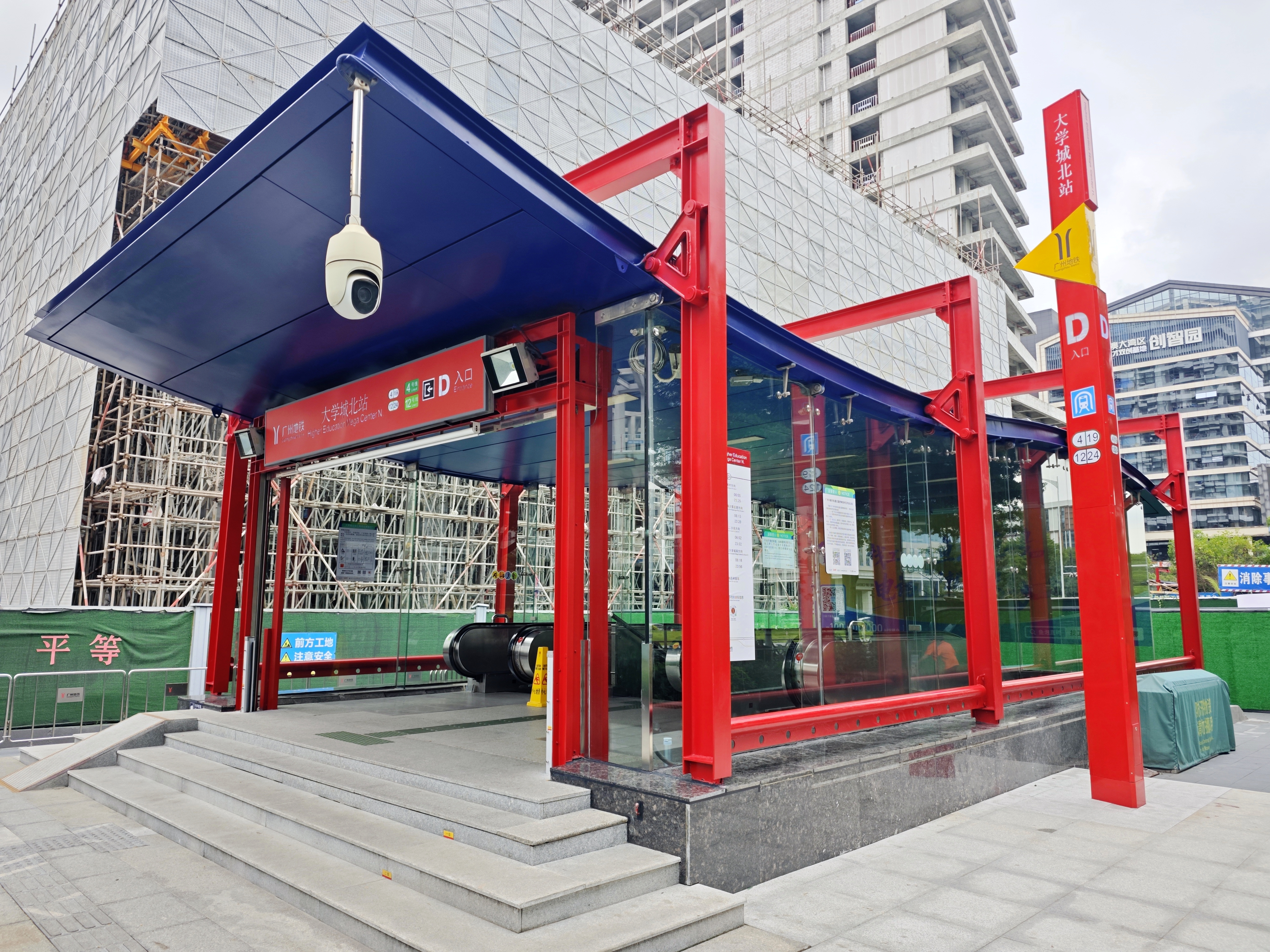
Entrance D

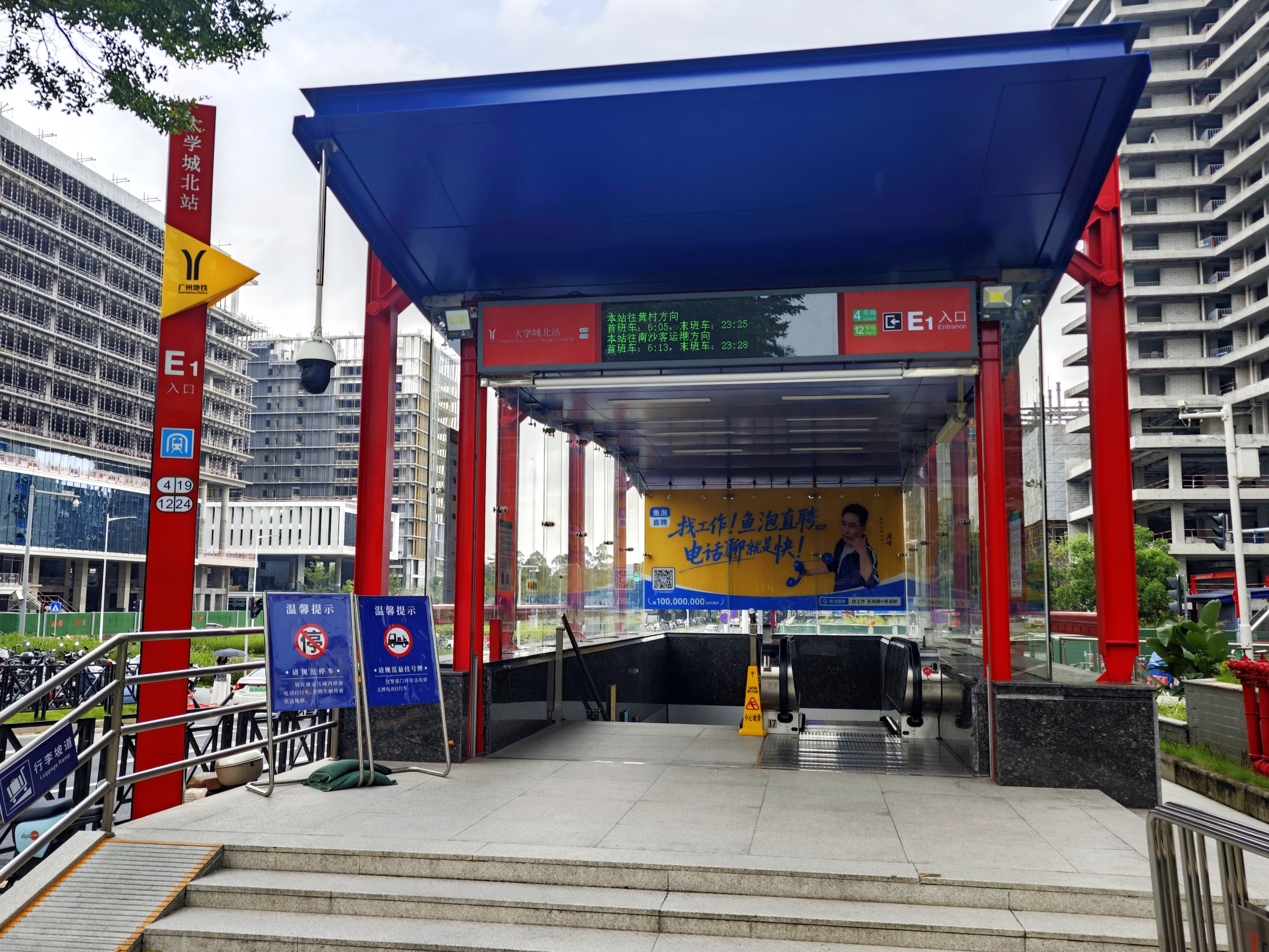
Entrance E1

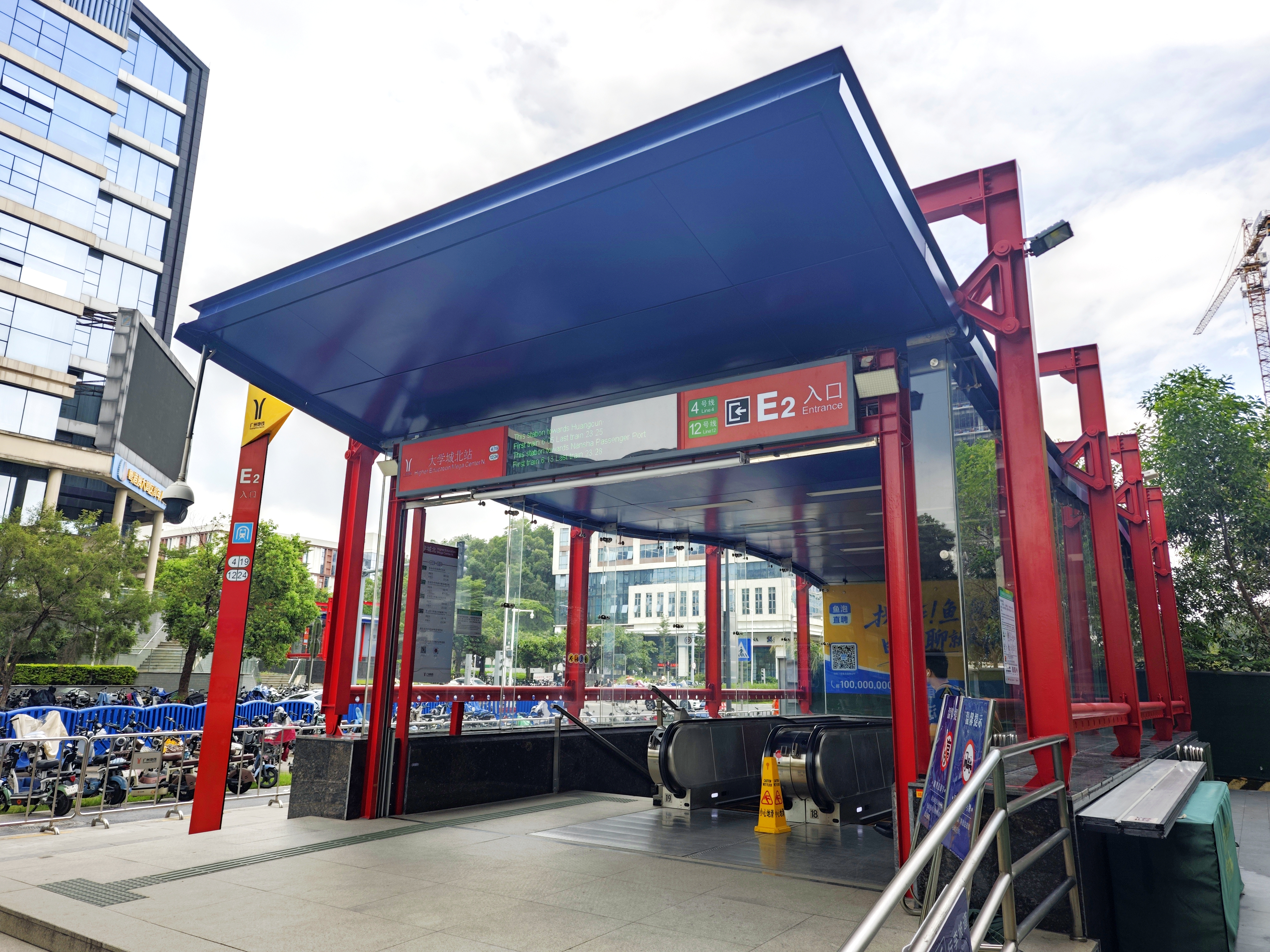
Entrance E2

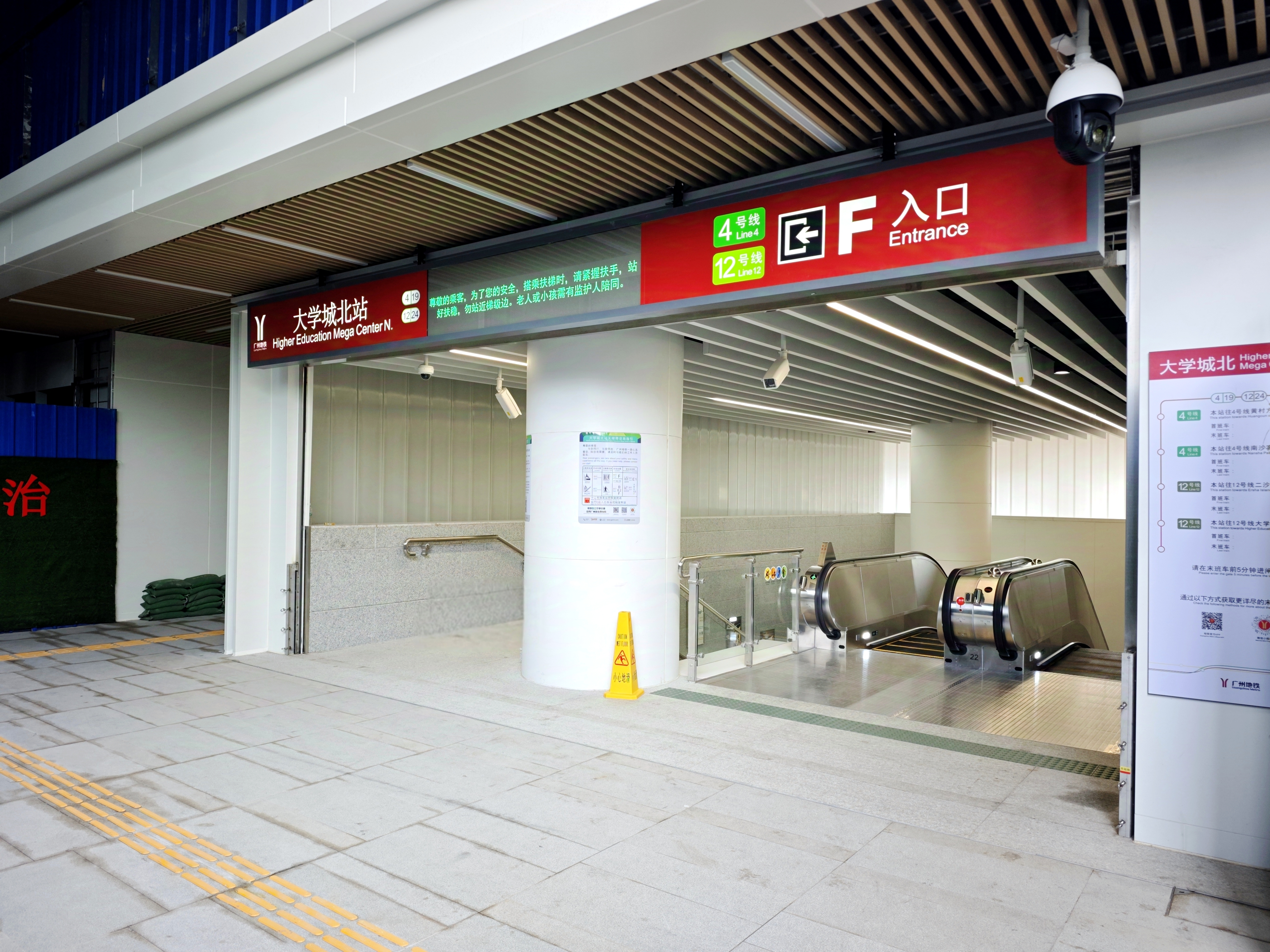
Entrance F

== History ==
=== Line 4 ===
The station first appeared in the "Near-Term Online Network Planning Implementation Adjustment Plan" in 2000, as one of the intermediate stations of the newly emerged Line 4 and at the same time one of the supporting stations of the Higher Education Mega Center, so it was also named Higher Education Mega Center station. Subsequently, the station was included in the first section of Line 4 (Higher Education Mega Center Line) project and was constructed in advance. On the eve of the opening of the station, the station was renamed Beiting station. On 26 December 2005, the first section of Line 4 (Higher Education Mega Center Line) was officially opened, and the station was opened. In May 2006, the station was renamed Higher Education Mega Center North station.

During COVID-19 pandemic control rules at the end of 2022, the station was affected by prevention and control measures and its service was suspended from 28 November to the afternoon of 30 November.

=== Line 12 ===
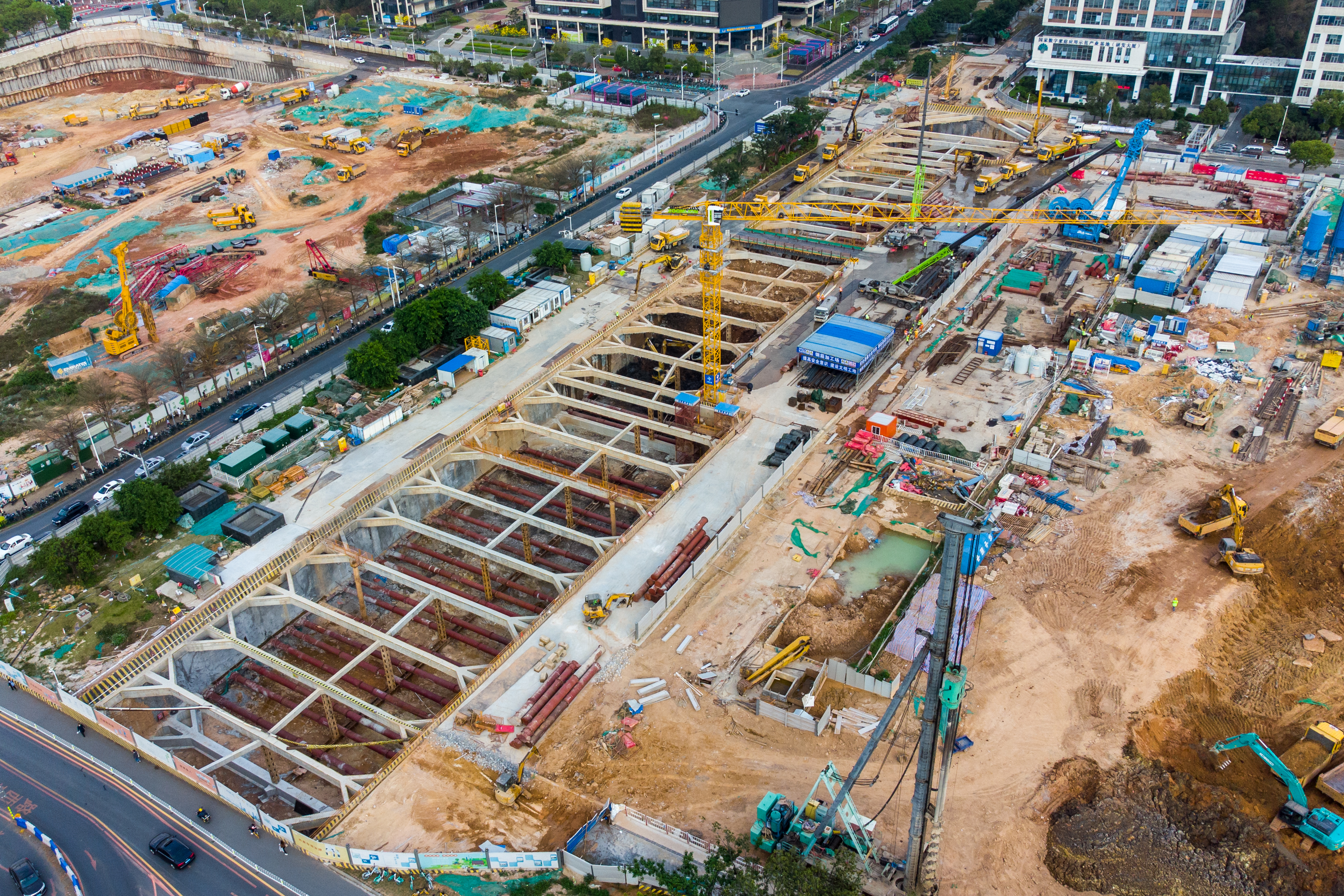
Line 12 construction site (March 2022)

The station plan for Line 12 first appeared in the 2008 plan, and the southern section between Guanzhou and Higher Education Mega Center South was established as a three-station parallel to Line 4. It was not until 2017 that the southern terminal of Line 12 was changed to Science Center, and Higher Education Mega Center South station was cancelled for a time, until March of the same year, when Line 12 was included in the third phase of the construction plan of the Guangzhou Metro and was approved by the National Development and Reform Commission. In April 2019, there were documents showing that Line 12 was changed to a station next to the Higher Education Mega Center Lake, but later it was changed back to Higher Education Mega Center North.

As per the construction of the Line 12 station, the original exits on the west side of the Line 4 station were closed and demolished, of which Exit A was closed on 1 June 2020 and Exit B on 31 August 2020. Exit C was closed on 8 April 2021, in which Exits E1 and E2 were opened on the same day.

On 14 March 2025, the Line 12 station completed the "three rights" transfer, and opened on 29 June the same year.
