= Guanzhou station (Guangzhou Metro) =

Guangzhou Metro station

Guanzhou 官洲
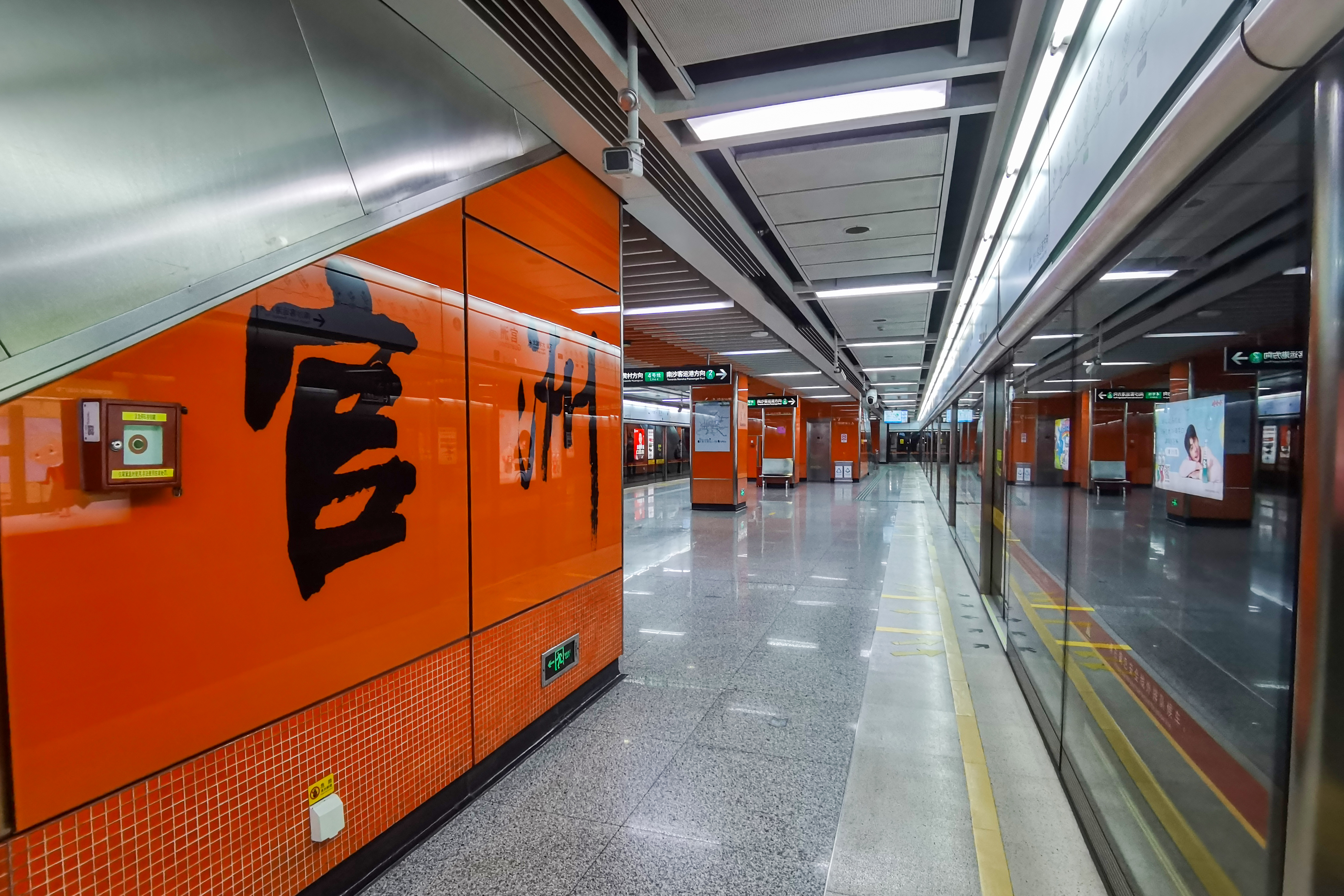
- Line 4 platform (2021)

Chinese name
- Chinese: 官洲站
- Postal: Dove Island station
Transcriptions
Standard Mandarin
- Hanyu Pinyin: Guānzhōu Zhàn
Yue: Cantonese
- Yale Romanization: Gūnjāu Jaahm
- Jyutping: Gun^{1}zau^{1} Zaam^{6}

General information
- Location: Guanzhou Island (International Bio Island) Central Spiral Avenue Intersection; Guanzhou Subdistrict, Haizhu District, Guangzhou, Guangdong; China
- Coordinates: 23°04′00″N 113°22′37″E
- Operator: Guangzhou Metro Co. Ltd.
- Lines: Line 4; Line 12
- Platforms: 4 (2 island platforms)
- Tracks: 4

Construction
- Structure type: Underground
- Accessible: Yes

Other information
- Station code: 420 1223

History
- Opened: Line 4: 26 December 2005 (20 years ago); Line 12: 29 June 2025 (13 months ago)

Services
Preceding station	Guangzhou Metro	Following station
Wanshengwei towards Huangcun	Line 4	Higher Education Mega Center North towards Nansha Passenger Port
Beishan towards Ersha Island	Line 12 East section	Higher Education Mega Center North towards Higher Education Mega Center South
Location

Guanzhou Station (Chinese: 官洲站; Jyutping: gun^{1} zau^{1} zaam^{6}; Cantonese Yale: Gūnjāu Jaahm) is an interchange station between Line 4 and Line 12 of the Guangzhou Metro. The Line 4 station started operations on 26 December 2005. It is located at the underground of the central part of Guanzhou Island in Haizhu District. It was constructed to cope with the Guangzhou International Biological Island, a science and technology development zone led by biological industry that opened in 2011.

Before the station opened, no land transport was provided between Guanzhou Island and Guangzhou urban. Only ships were available to provide the transport service for the island.

On 29 June 2025, Line 12 started operations at the station, thus becoming an interchange station.

== Station layout ==
The station is a three-storey underground station. The ground level is the exit, and it is surrounded by Spiral Avenue, Guanzhou Life Science Innovation Center and other nearby buildings around the biological island. The first floor is the concourse, the second floor is the equipment level and the platform for Line 4, and the third floor is the platform for Line 12.

G	-	Exits A, B, D, E, F, G
L1; Concourse	4 Lobby	Ticket Machines, Customer Service, Shops, Police Station, Security Facilities
L1; Concourse	12 Lobby	Ticket Machines, Customer Service, Shops, Police Station, Security Facilities
L2; 4 Platforms	Line 12 Equipment Level	Station Equipment
L2; 4 Platforms	Platform 2	4 towards Nansha Passenger Port (Higher Education Mega Center North)
L2; 4 Platforms	Island platform, doors will open on the left
L2; 4 Platforms	Platform 1	4 towards Huangcun (Wanshengwei)
L3; 12 Platforms	Platform 4	12 towards Ersha Island (Beishan)
L3; 12 Platforms	Island platform, doors will open on the left (Toilets, Nursery)
L3; 12 Platforms	Platform 3	12 Higher Education Mega Center South (Higher Education Mega Center North)

=== Concourse and transfer method ===
The concourse is divided into two parts, Line 4 and Line 12, both of which are located on the first floor, and the paid and non-paid areas of the two concourses are connected by the liaison interface, of which the non-paid area interface is located on the south side of the station. There are automated external defibrillators next to the station control center and near the entrance gates.

The concourse of the station is equipped with electronic ticket vending machines and AI customer service centers. There are also card recharge and vending machines. There are elevators, escalators and stairs in the fare-paid areas of Line 4 and Line 12 for passengers to access the platforms.

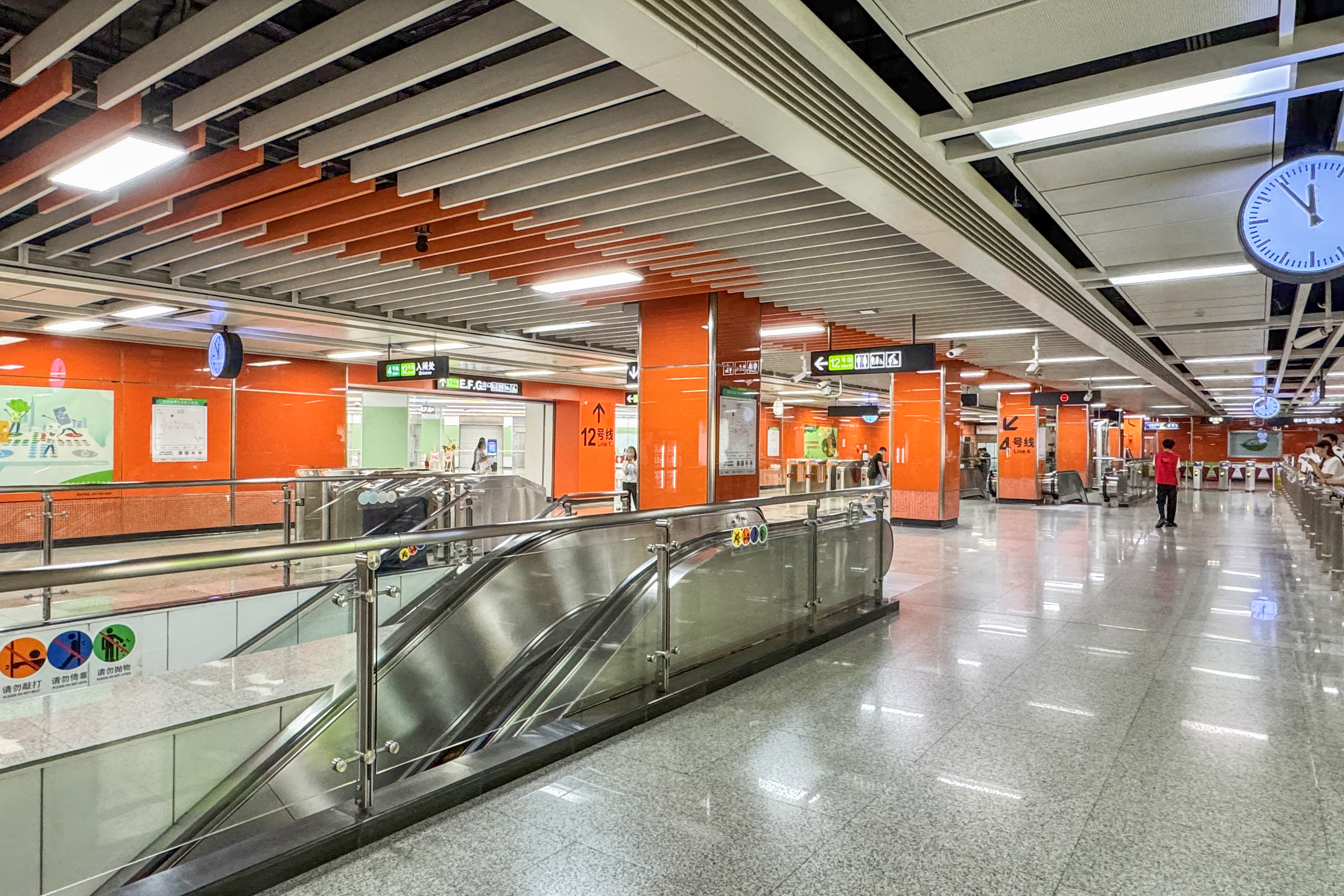
Line 4 concourse

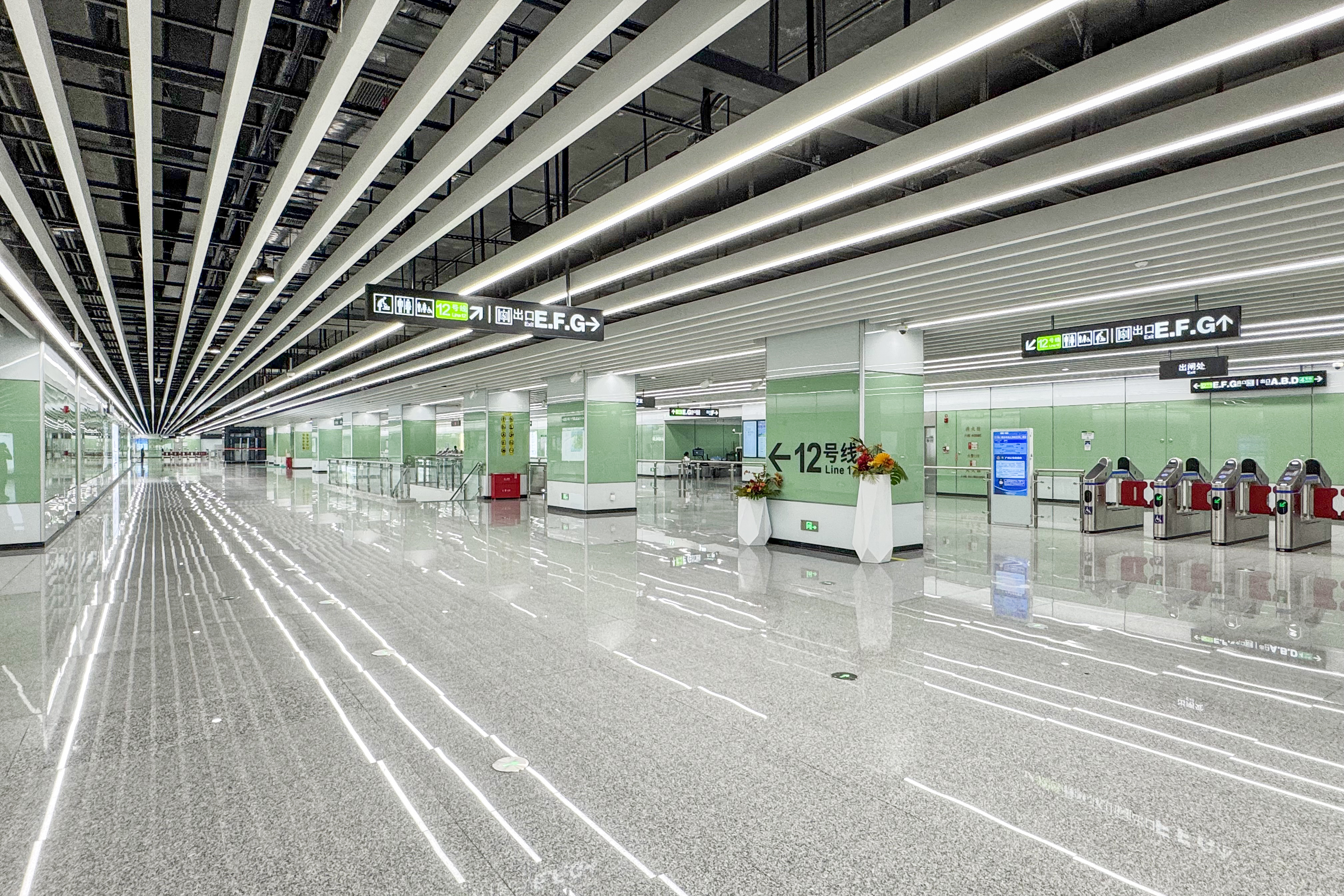
Line 12 concourse

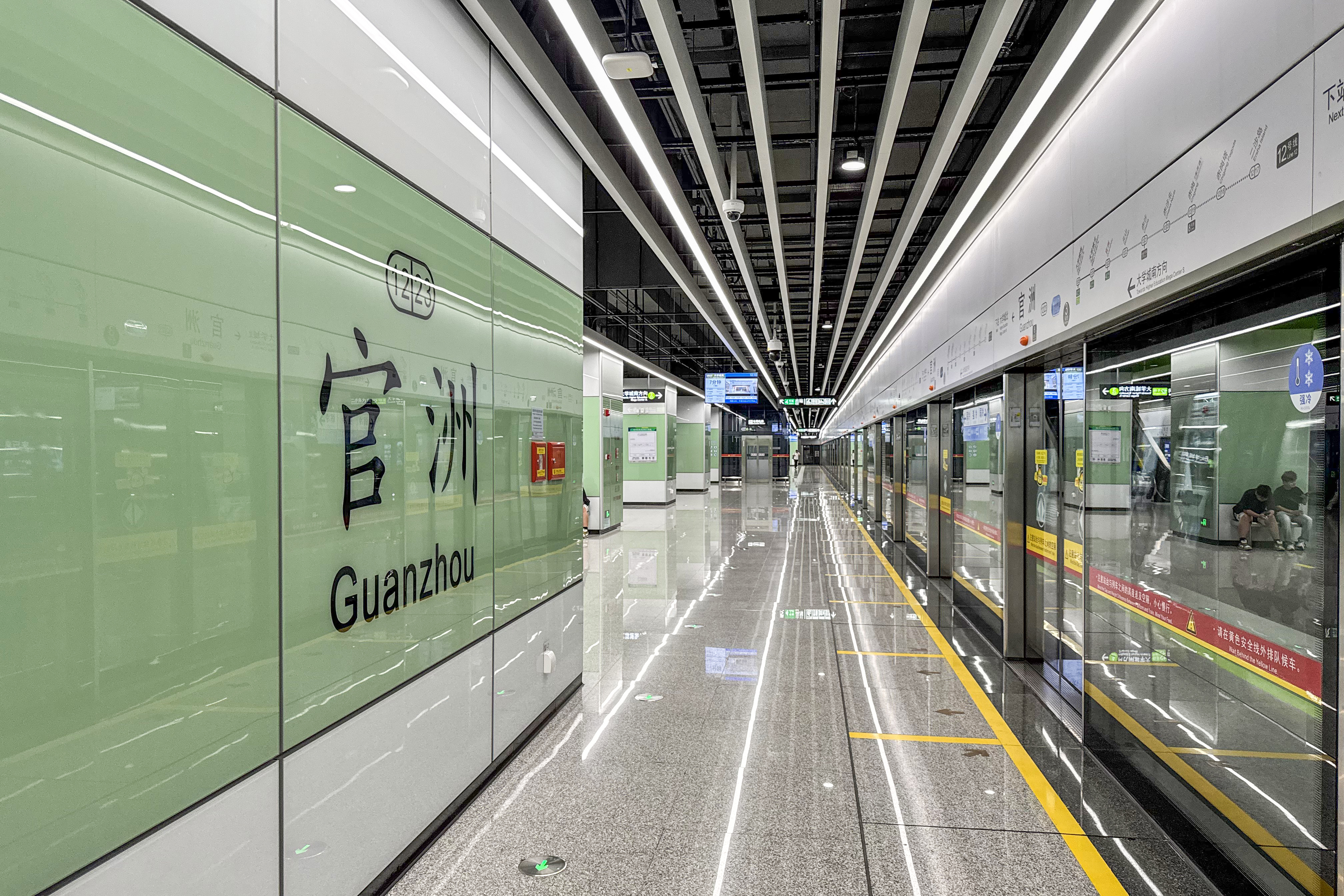
Line 12 platform

=== Platforms ===
The station has an island platform each for Line 4 and Line 12. The Line 4 platforms located on the upper level is located under the intersection of Spiral Avenue in the middle of the island, and the Line 12 platforms on the lower level is located under the planned Xingji 2nd Road extension. The two platforms roughly form a "V" shape.

Toilets and a nursery room are located at the Higher Education Mega Center South end of the Line 12 platforms.

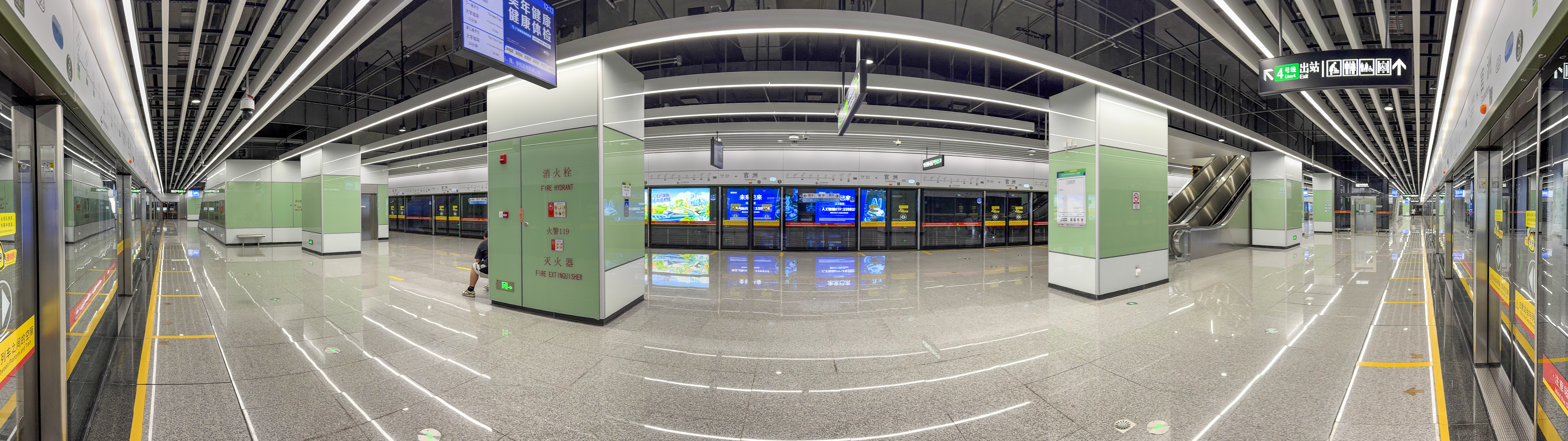
Line 12 platform panorama

=== Entrances/exits ===
The station has 6 points of entry/exit. When the station initially opened, there was also Exit C, which was later discontinued and demolished on 27 November 2019 due to the construction of the Line 12 station, and three new entrances/exits (E, F, G) were added to the Line 12 station.

- A: Bio-island, Bio Island Tunnel
- B: Bio-island
- D: Bio-island
- E: Bio-island
- F: Bio-island
- G: Bio-island

Exit B is equipped with a stairlift, and Exit G is equipped with an elevator.

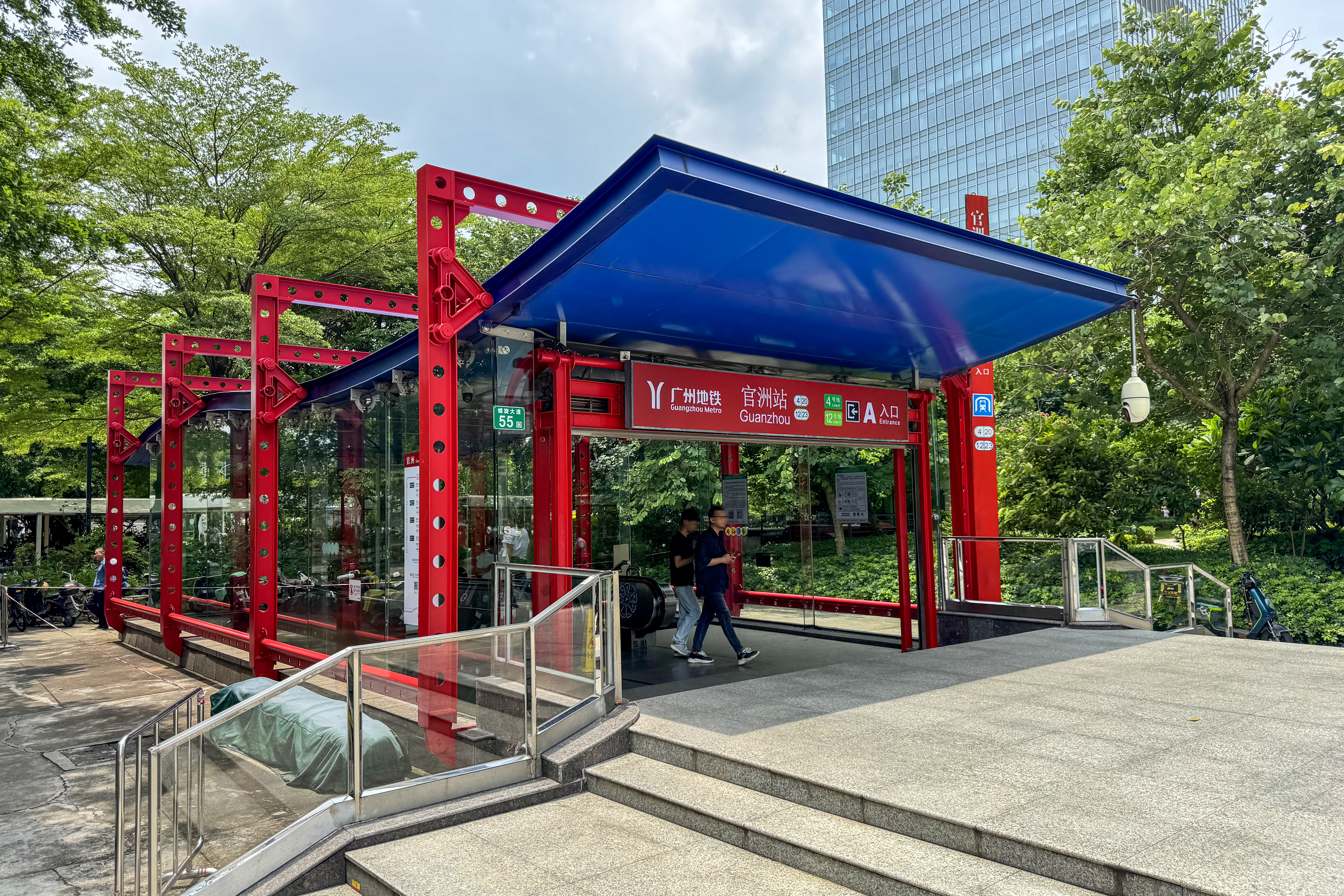
Entrance A

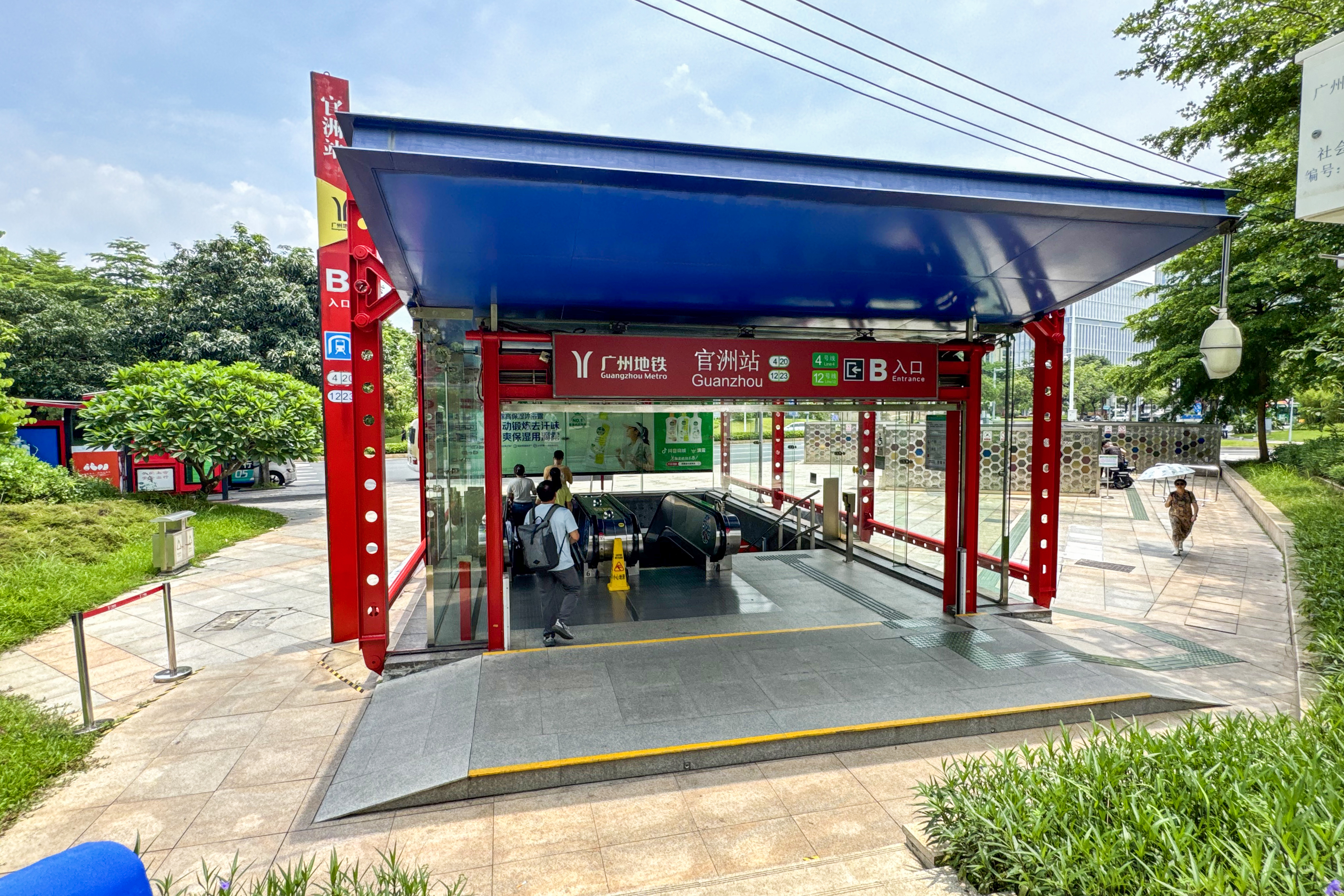
Entrance B

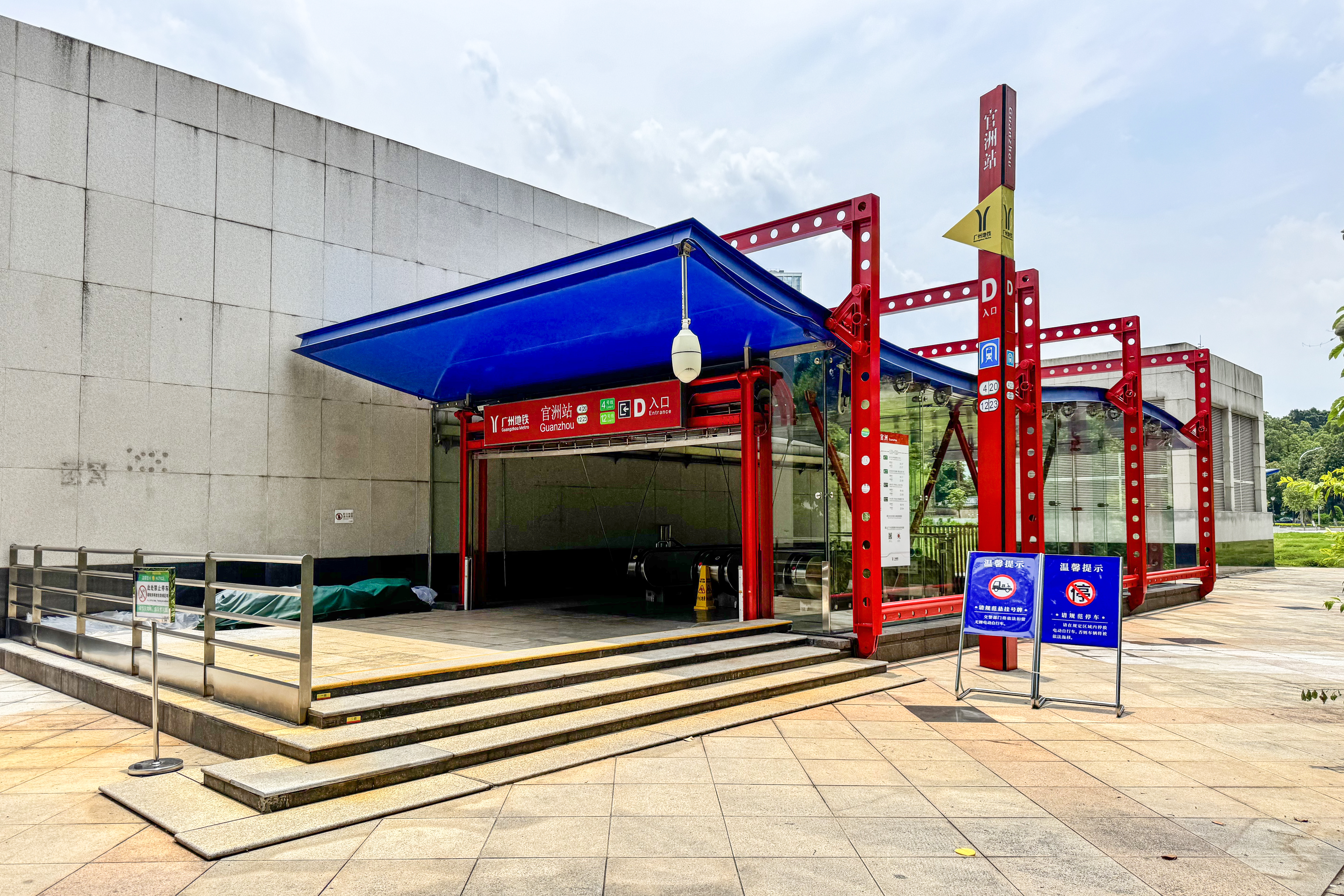
Entrance D

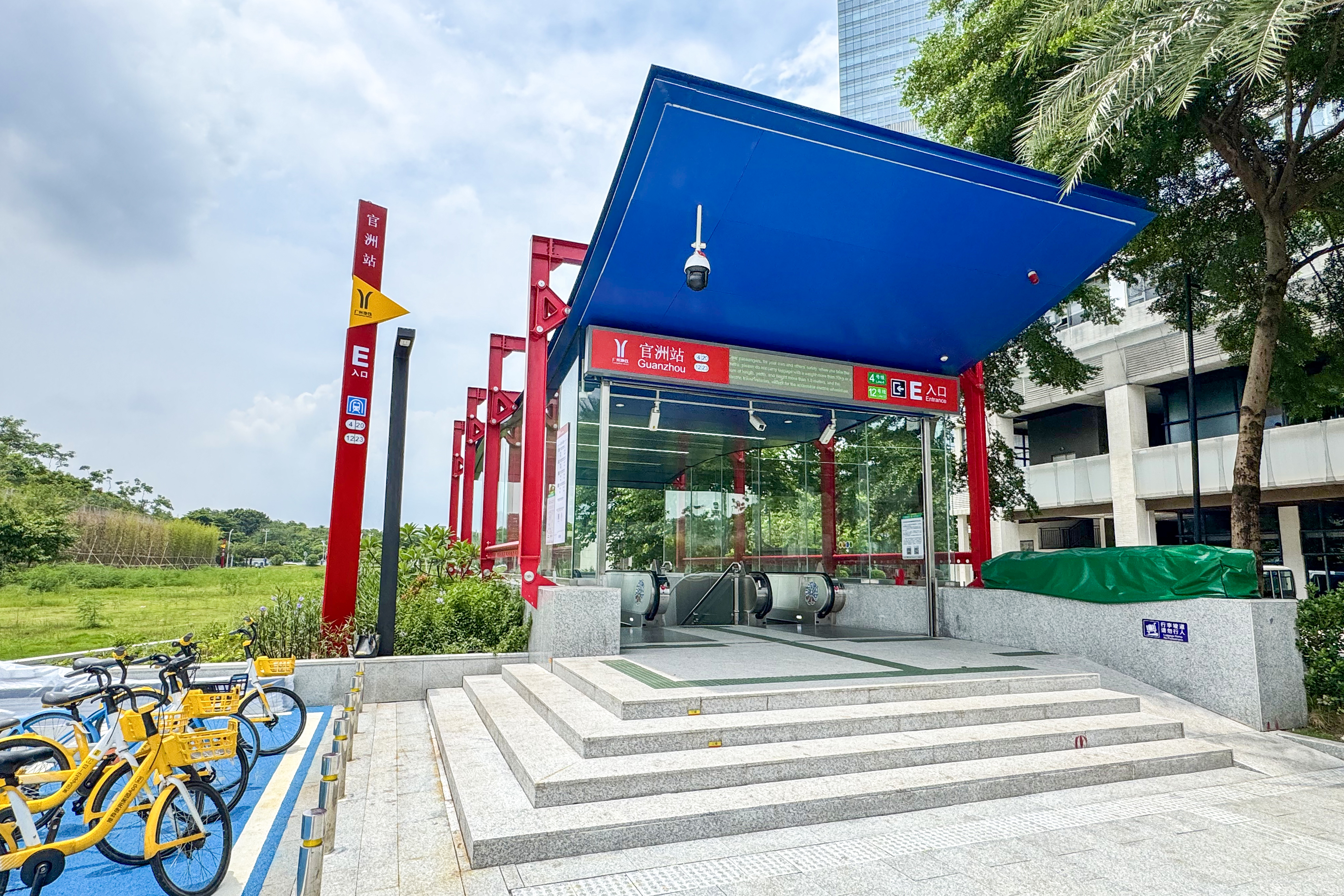
Entrance E

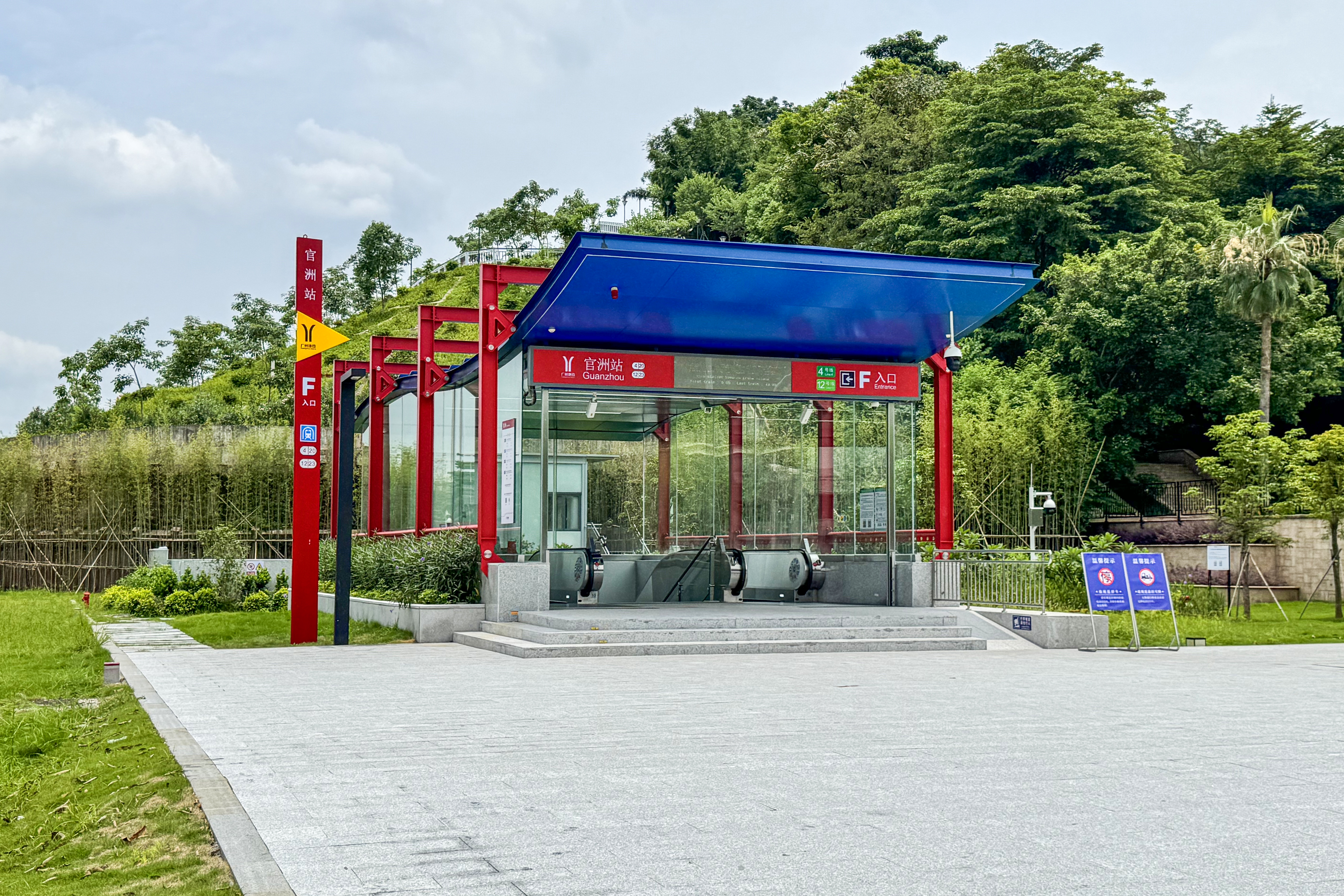
Entrance F

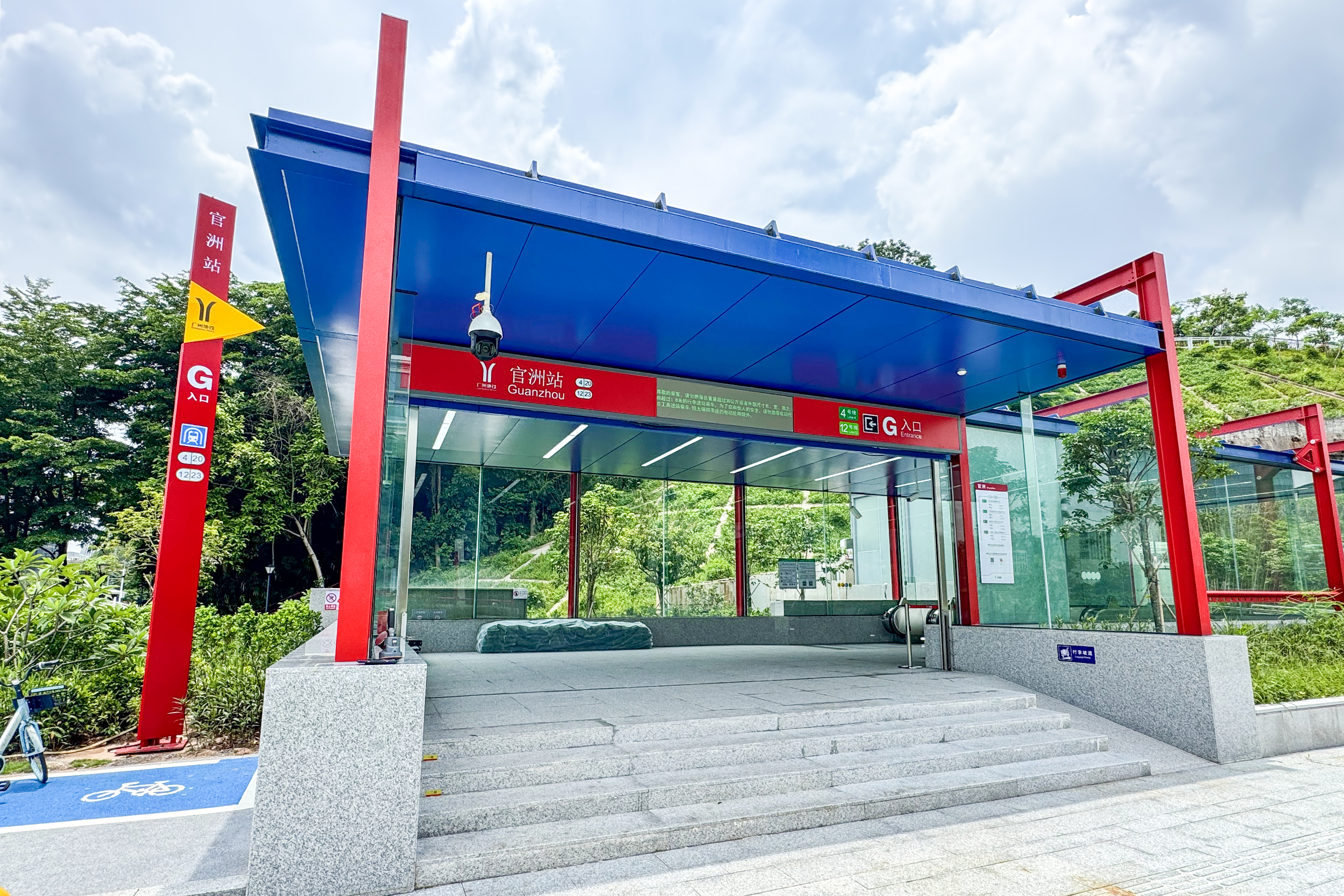
Entrance G

== Usage ==
This station is the only metro station on Guanzhou Island, and it was once the only land transportation mode to enter the island. At that time, as there was no road to urban Guangzhou, only ships could be taken to and from Guanzhou Island before the opening of this station. Although Guanzhou Island was planned as an international biological island and the construction of the island began in 2008, it has not been effectively developed for a long time, resulting in an extremely low passenger flow. Guangzhou Metro released the average daily passenger flow of each station in the line network in July 2011, and this station ranked second to last with 400 passengers. With the improvement of the island's facilities and the increase in the number of enterprises stationed on the island, the number of visitors to this station has also increased.

== History ==
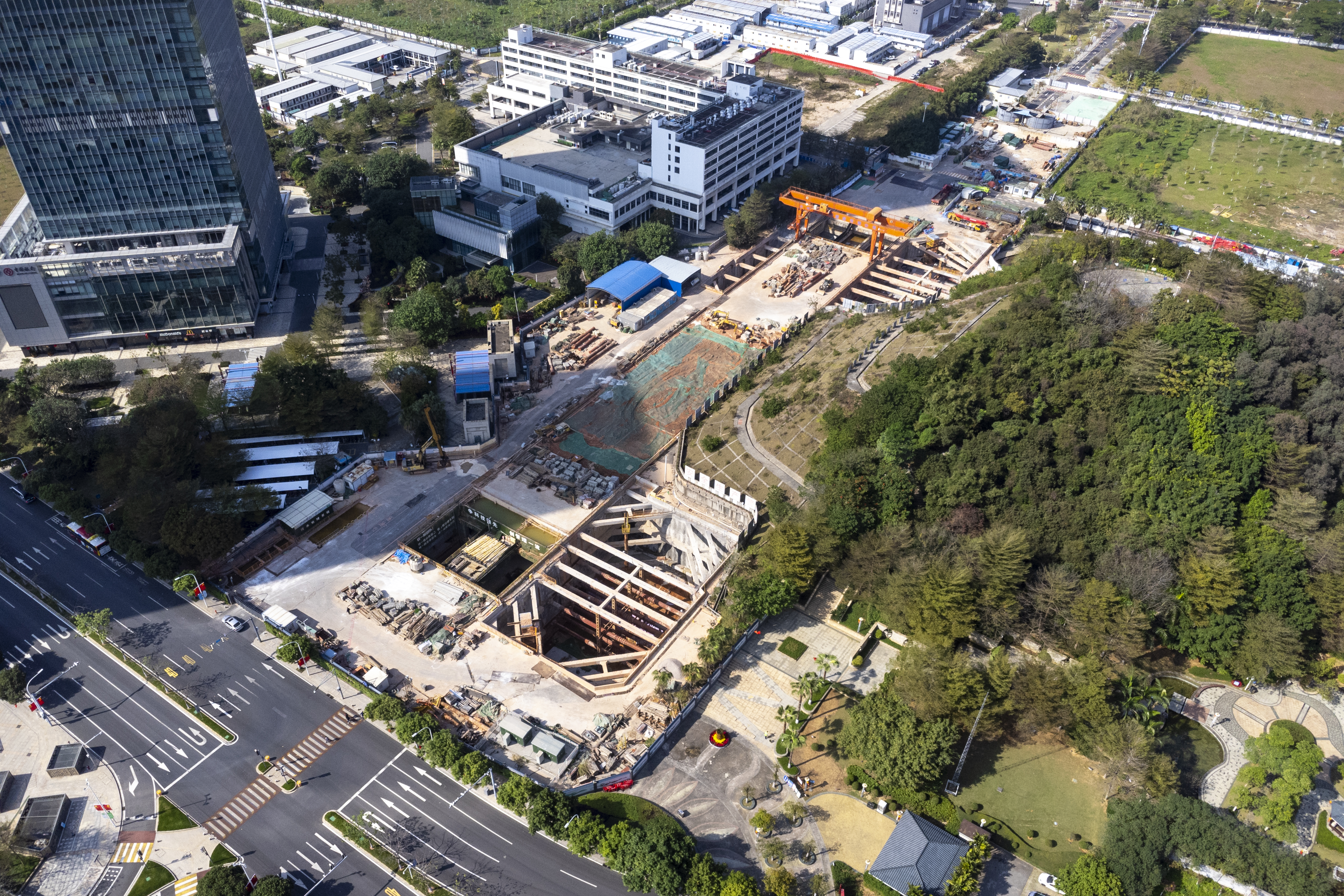
Line 12 construction site (January 2023)

The station first appeared in the "Near-Term Online Network Planning Implementation Adjustment Plan" in 2000, as one of the intermediate stations of the newly emerged Line 4 and is also one of the supporting facilities of Guangzhou International Biological Island. Subsequently, the station was included in the first section of Line 4 (Higher Education Mega Center Line) project and was constructed in advance. On 26 December 2005, the first section of Line 4 (University City Line) was officially opened to traffic, and the station was opened.

In March 2017, Line 12 was included in the construction plan of the third phase of Guangzhou Metro and was approved by the National Development and Reform Commission, and the construction of Line 12 station was implemented after the environmental impact assessment. Enclosure construction began on 12 April 2019, main structure construction began on 26 December 2019 and the roof slab was sealed on 24 November 2020. The Line 12 station completed the "three rights" transfer in December 2024. On 29 June 2025, the Line 12 station opened.

In the initial stage of opening, the paid area of Line 4 was located on the southwest side, and later due to the need to create a transfer to the Line 12 station, the scope of the paid area was changed to the northeast side to access the paid area of the Line 12 concourse.
