= Beishan station =

Guangzhou Metro Line 12 station

Beishan 北山
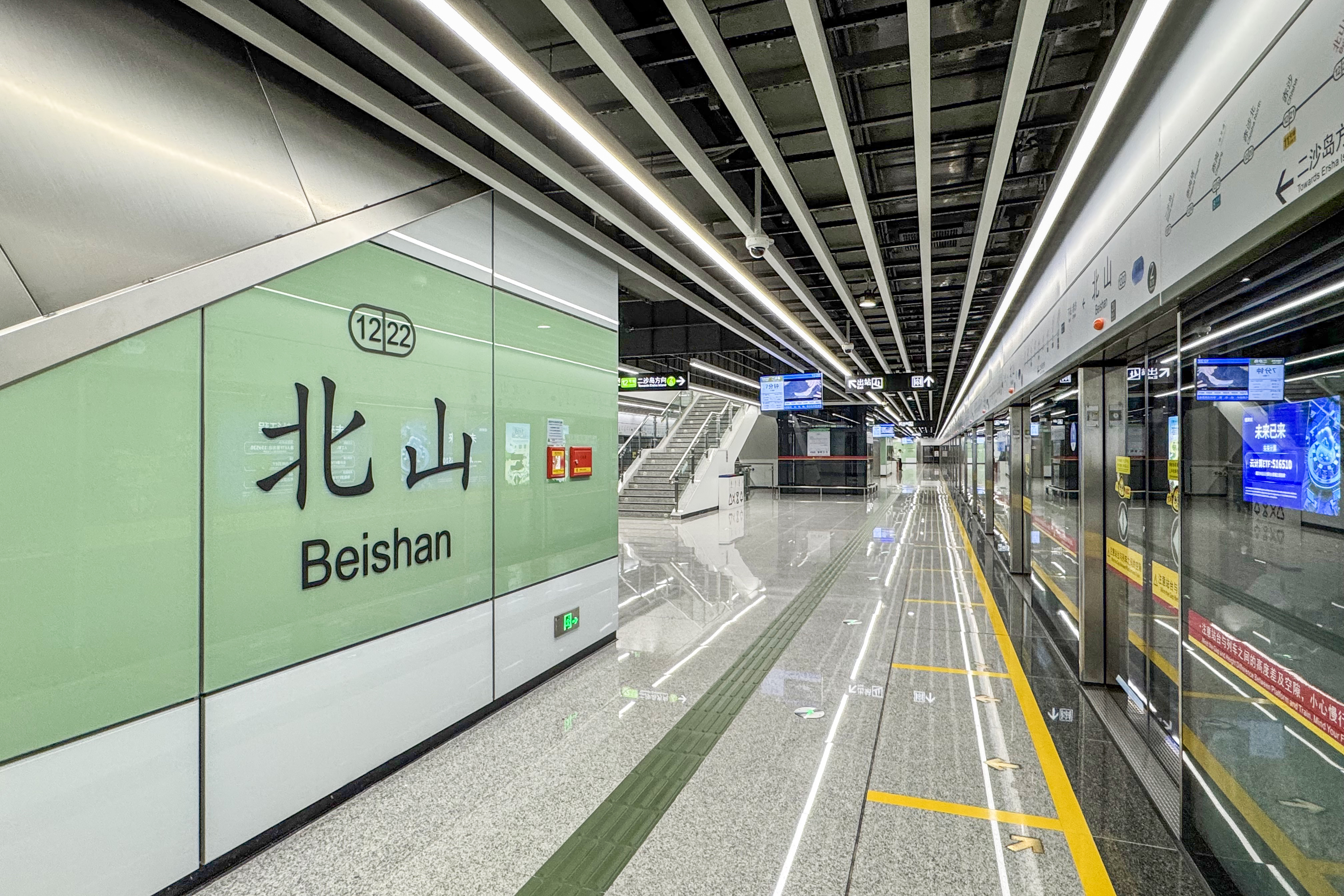
- Platform

Chinese name
- Chinese: 北山站
- Literal meaning: North Hill station
Transcriptions
Standard Mandarin
- Hanyu Pinyin: Běishān Zhàn
Yue: Cantonese
- Yale Romanization: Bāksāan Jaahm
- Jyutping: Bak^{1}saan^{1} Zaam^{6}
- Hong Kong Romanization: Pak Shan station

General information
- Location: Southeast side of the intersection of Xinjiao East Road (新滘东路) and Keyuan South Road (科韵南路); Guanzhou Subdistrict, Haizhu District, Guangzhou, Guangdong; China
- Coordinates: 23°5′9.49″N 113°22′12.94″E
- Operator: Guangzhou Metro Co. Ltd.
- Line: Line 12
- Platforms: 2 (1 island platform)
- Tracks: 2

Construction
- Structure type: Underground
- Accessible: Yes

Other information
- Station code: 1222

History
- Opened: 29 June 2025 (15 months ago)
- Former names: Luntou (仑头)

Services
Preceding station	Guangzhou Metro	Following station
Chisha towards Ersha Island	Line 12 East section	Guanzhou towards Higher Education Mega Center South
Location

Beishan station (Chinese: 北山站; Jyutping: bak^{1} saan^{1} zaam^{6}; Cantonese Yale: Bāksāan Jaahm; lit. 'North Hill station') is a station on Line 12 of the Guangzhou Metro. It is located underground on the southeast side of the intersection of Xinjiao East Road and Keyuan South Road in Haizhu District of Guangzhou. It opened on 29 June 2025.

== Station layout ==
The station has two floors. The ground level is the exit, and it is surrounded by Keyuan South Road, Beishan Village, Guanzhou Beiyuan and other nearby buildings. The first floor is the concourse, and the second floor is the platform for Line 12.

G	-	Exits A, B1, B3, C
L1; Concourse	Lobby	Ticket Machines, Customer Service, Shops, Police Station, Security Facilities
L2; Platforms	Platform 2	12 towards Ersha Island (Chisha)
L2; Platforms	Island platform, doors will open on the left (Toilets, Nursery)
L2; Platforms	Platform 1	12 towards Higher Education Mega Center South (Guanzhou)

=== Concourse ===
There are automatic ticket machines and an AI customer service center at the concourse. There are elevators, escalators, and stairs in the fare-paid area for passengers to reach the platform.

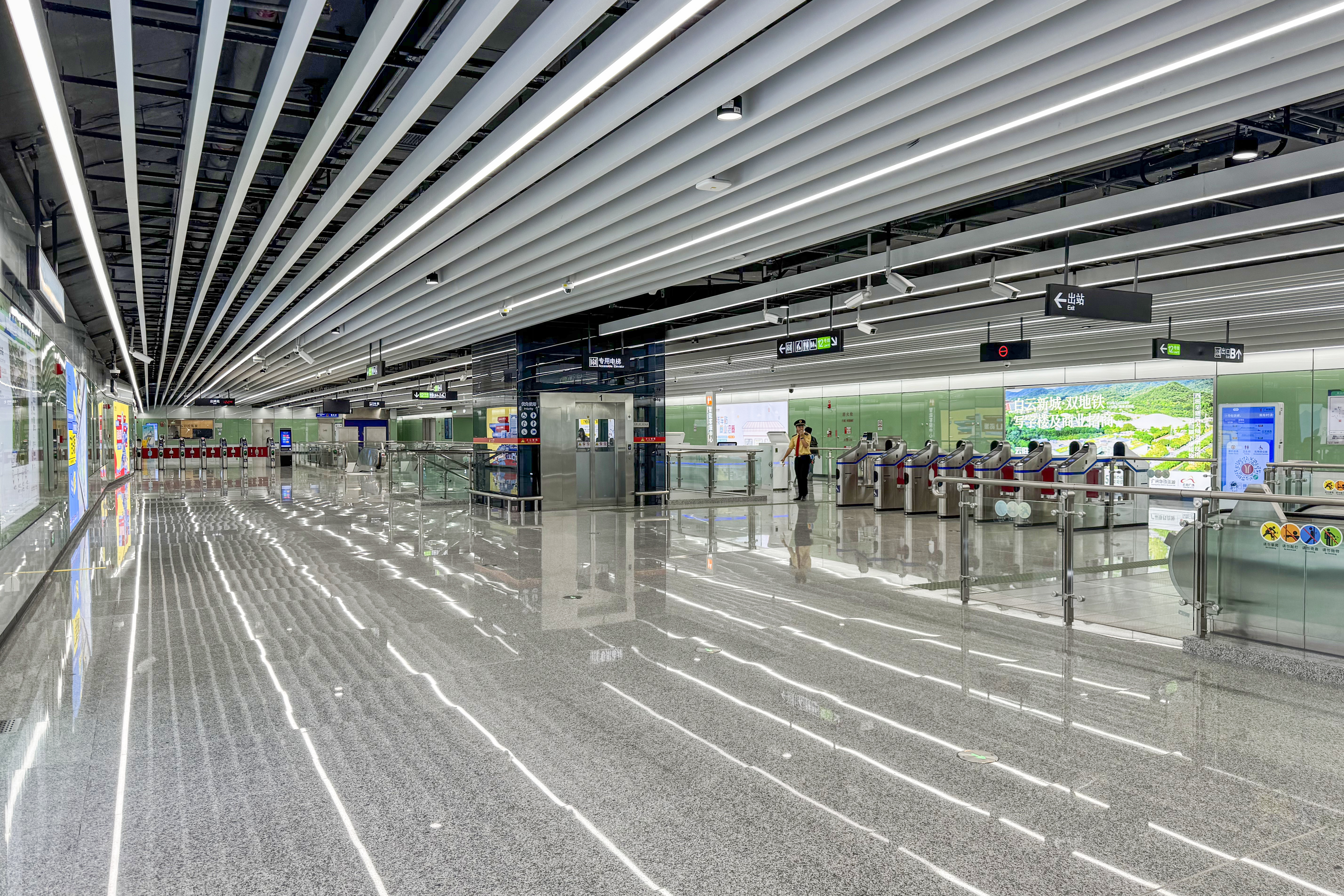
Concourse

=== Platform ===
The station has an island platform located underground on Keyuan South Road. Toilets and a nursery room are located at the end of the platform towards Higher Education Mega Center South.

In addition, there is a storage track at the south end of the platform towards Guanzhou station.

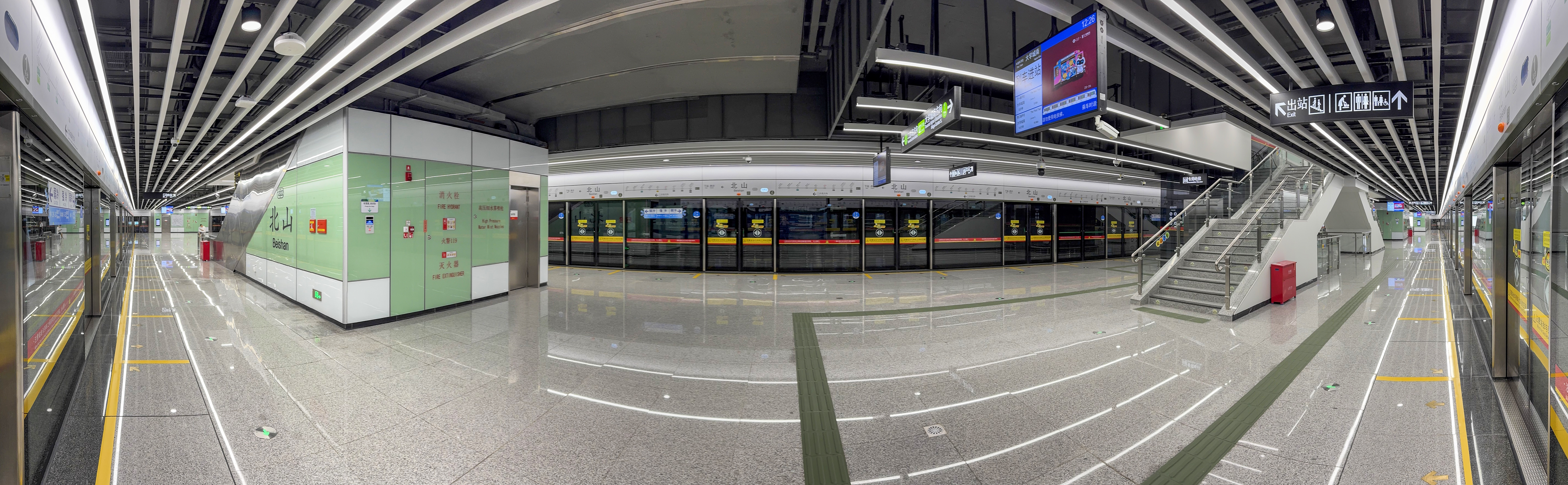
Platform panorama

=== Entrances/exits ===
The station has 4 points of entry/exit. Exits B1 and B2 are equipped with elevators.

- B1 & B2: Keyun South Road
- B3: Xinjiao East Road
- C: Xinjiao East Road
Entrance B1

Elevator of Entrance B1

Entrance B2

Elevator of Entrance B2

Entrance B3

Entrance C

== History ==
The station was called Luntou station during planning and construction. In March 2020, the station completed the pouring of the first ground connecting wall, and in November the same year, it passed the foundation pit excavation acceptance and entered the stage of full excavation construction. In January 2025, the station completed the "three rights" transfer.

In August 2024, the initial names of the eastern section of Line 12 stations was announced, and the station was renamed Beishan station. However, the name change caused dissatisfaction among Luntou Village, and the Civil Affairs Bureau responded that it would ask the authorities to further verify the location of the station and the land use. In April of the following year, the official station name of the eastern section of Line 12 was announced, and the station kept the name of Beishan station.

On 29 June 2025, the station opened.
