= Guanzhou Island =

Island in Guangzhou, China

Coordinates: 23°4′6″N 113°22′10″E

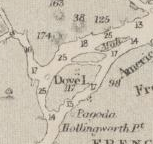
A map of Canton River had scaled by UK Government in 1861

Guanzhou Island (simplified Chinese: 官洲岛; traditional Chinese: 官洲島; pinyin: Guānzhōu dǎo), formerly known in English as Dove Island, is an island in Haizhu District, Guangzhou, Guangdong Province, China. It is also branded as Guangzhou International Biotech Island (simplified Chinese: 广州国际生物岛; traditional Chinese: 廣州國際生物島; pinyin: Guǎngzhōu guójì shēngwù dǎo) since July 2011, forming the centre of Guangzhou's biotech basis.

== Geography and Administration ==
Guangzhou International Biotech Island covers a total area of 1.8 square kilometers. Part of Huangpu District, it is located right between Huangpu and Haizhu District.

== Guangzhou International Biotech Island ==
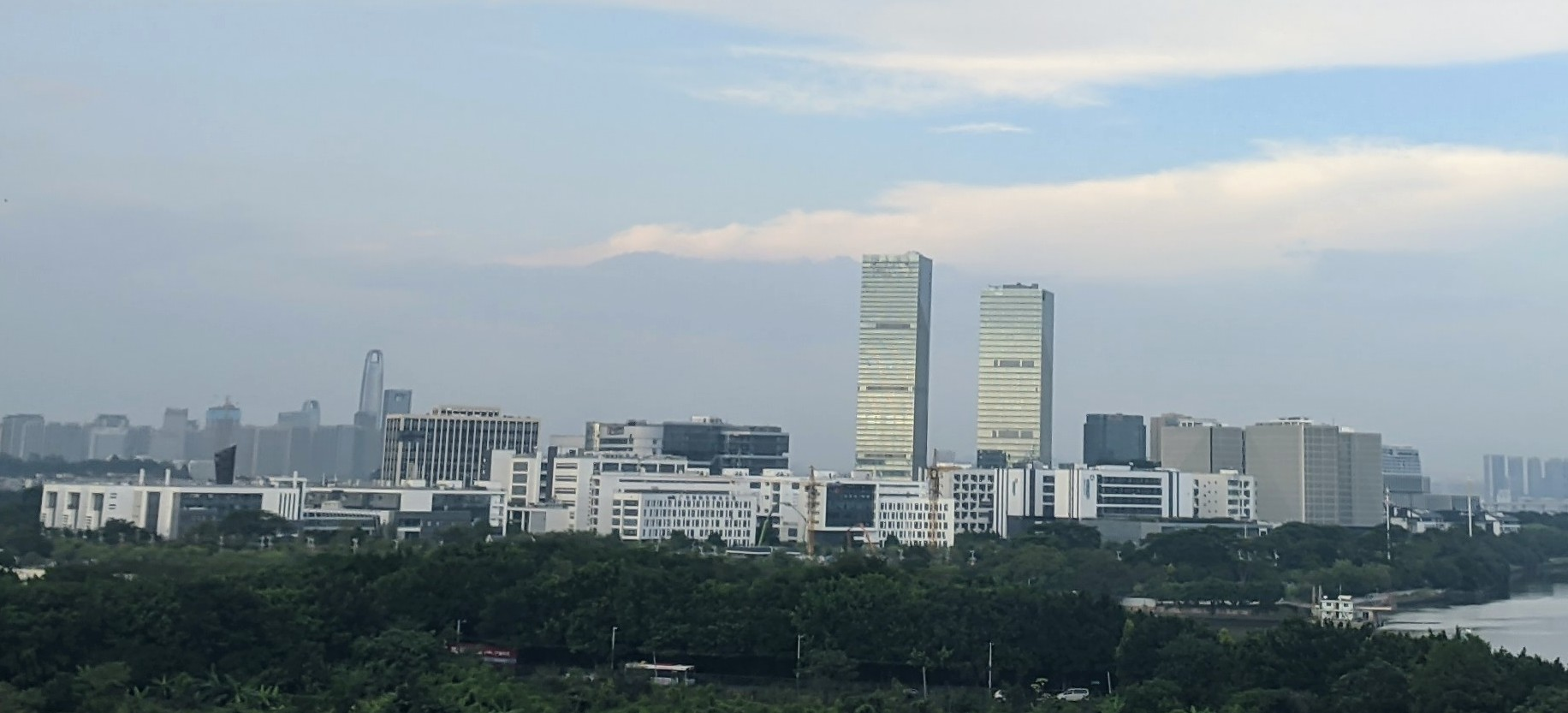
Guangzhou International Biotech Island

In 1999, Guangzhou Municipal Government announced plans to develop Guanzhou Island into Guangzhou International Biotech Island (Chinese: 广州国际生物岛), in order to meet the need of biological technology development. In 2000, Guanzhou Island was approved to establish an international biotechnology research and production base, and was officially named "Guangzhou International Biotech Island". Construction began in 2008. It was officially put into operation in July 2011. It is now under the jurisdiction of the Guangzhou Economic and Technological Development Zone, but the entire island is under the jurisdiction of Guangzhou Economic and Technological Development Zone. The administrative division still belongs to Haizhu District.

A website about the "bio-island" says the aim is to put "emphasis on introducing domestic and overseas high-end biotechnology enterprise headquarters and R&D center, biotechnology research and development institutions, biological service enterprises and organizations".

In April 2021, a joint venture of Geneseeq Technology and AstraZeneca announced plans to build a clinical diagnostics laboratory on the island.

== Transport ==
The island is served by Guanzhou station on Line 4 and Line 12 of the Guangzhou Metro.
