= Xintang Station =

Xintang Station may refer to:

- Guangzhou Xintang railway station, formerly known as Xintang railway station, a station on Guangzhou–Shenzhen railway in Xintang, Zengcheng, Guangzhou, Guangdong, China
- Xintang station (Guangzhou Metro), a station on the Guangzhou Metro in Guangzhou, Guangdong
- Xintang South railway station (Xintangnan railway station), formerly known as Xintang railway station, a station on Guangzhou–Shenzhen intercity railway in Xintang, Zengcheng, Guangzhou, Guangdong, China
- Xintang station (Hangzhou Metro), a station on the Hangzhou Metro in Hangzhou, Zhejiang
