= Xintang =

Xintang (Chinese: 新塘; pinyin: Xīntáng; Jyutping: san^{1}tong^{4}) may refer to the following places:

== Guangdong ==
- Guangzhou Xintang railway station, formerly known as Xintang and Xintang North, a railway station in Xintang, Zengcheng, Guangzhou, Guangdong, China
- Xintang, a town in Zengcheng, Guangzhou, Guangdong, China
- Xintang South railway station, a station on the Guangzhou–Shenzhen intercity railway, located near Xintang railway station
- Xintang station (Guangzhou Metro), a station on the Guangzhou Metro, located near Xintang railway station

== Zhejiang ==
- Xintang station (Hangzhou Metro), a station on the Hangzhou Metro in Jianggan, Hangzhou, Zhejiang, China

== See also ==
- San Tong (Chinese: 新塘; pinyin: Xīntáng; Jyutping: san^{1}tong^{4}), a village in Lam Tsuen, Tai Po District, the New Territories, Hong Kong
