= Baijiang station =

Guangzhou Metro station

Coordinates: 23°07′24″N 113°35′44″E

Baijiang 白江
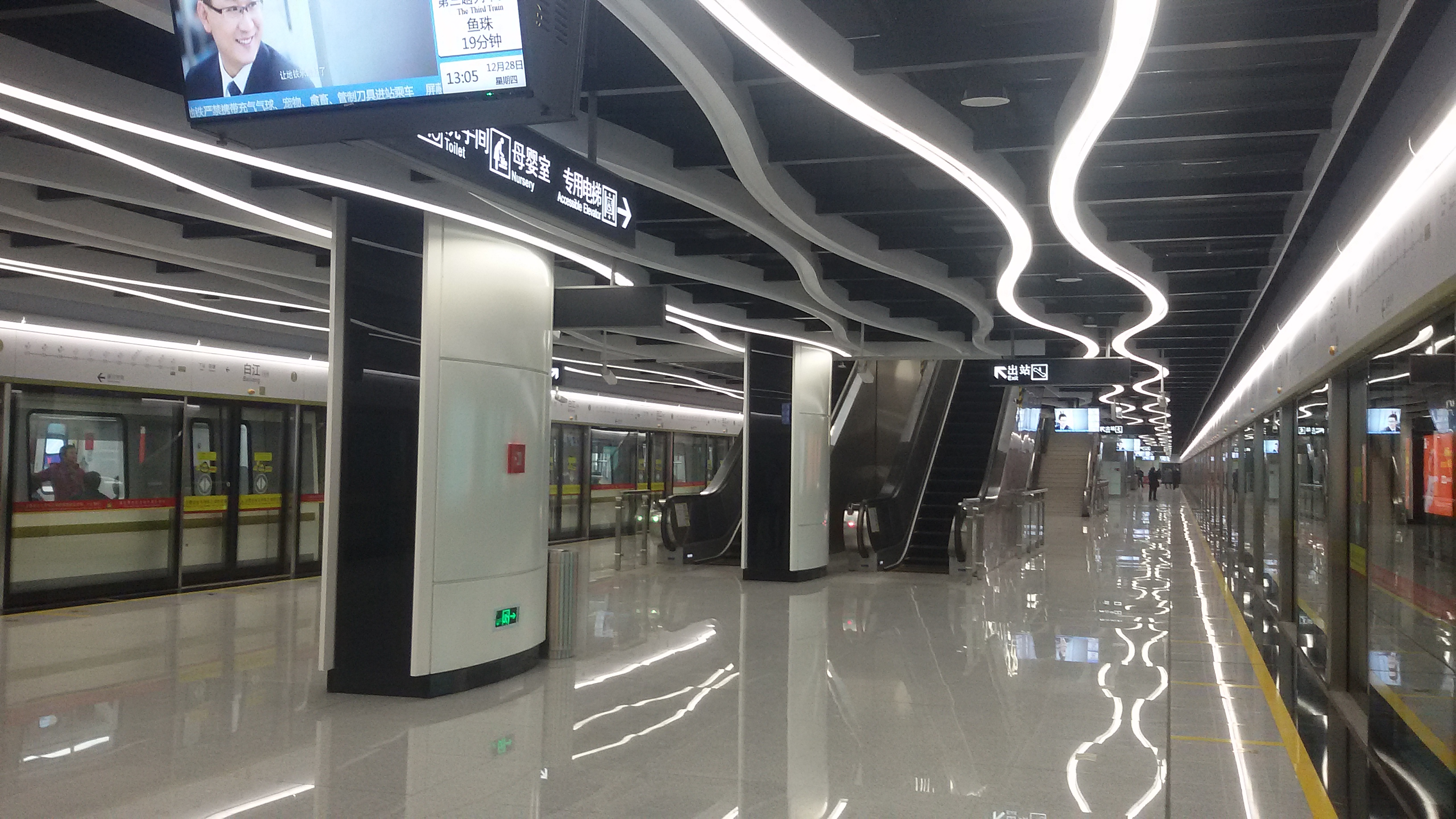

General information
- Location: West Guangshen Avenue (G107) and Dongjiang Avenue (东江大道); Zengcheng District, Guangzhou, Guangdong; China
- Operator: Guangzhou Metro Co. Ltd.
- Line: Line 13

Construction
- Structure type: Underground

Other information
- Station code: 1331

History
- Opened: 28 December 2017; 8 years ago

Services
Preceding station	Guangzhou Metro	Following station
Shacun towards Tianhe Park	Line 13	Xintang towards Xinsha
Location

Baijiang station (Chinese: 白江站; pinyin: Báijiāng Zhàn; Jyutping: baak^{6}gong^{1} zaam^{6}) is a station of Line 13 of the Guangzhou Metro. It started operations on 28 December 2017.

== Station layout ==
G	-	Exits
L1; Concourse	Lobby	Customer Service, Vending machines, ATMs
L2; Platforms	Platform 2	13 towards Tianhe Park (Shacun)
L2; Platforms	Island platform, doors will open on the left
L2; Platforms	Platform 1	13 towards Xinsha (Xintang)

== Exits ==
Exit number		Exit location
Exit B		Guangshen Dadaoxi
Exit C		Guangshen Dadaoxi
Exit D	D1	Guangshen Dadaoxi
Exit D	D2	Guangshen Dadaoxi
