= Route 16 =

Route 16 may refer to:

- One of several highways - see List of highways numbered 16
- One of several public transport routes - see List of public transport routes numbered 16
- Mystic Valley Parkway station, also called Route 16 - a proposed light rail station in Medford, Massachusetts
- Route-16, a 1981 video game
