= Line 16 =

Line 16 may refer to:

== China ==
- Line 16 (Beijing Subway)
- Line 16 (Guangzhou Metro)
- Line 16 (Hangzhou Metro)
- Line 16 (Shanghai Metro)
- Line 16 (Shenzhen Metro)
- Line 16 (Wuhan Metro)
- Line 16 (Xi'an Metro)

== Other countries ==
- Paris Metro Line 16, a line under construction in France
- Line 16 (São Paulo Metro), in Brazil

== See also ==
- List of public transport routes numbered 16
