= Guanhu station =

Guangzhou Metro station

Coordinates: 23°08′14″N 113°38′12″E

Guanhu 官湖
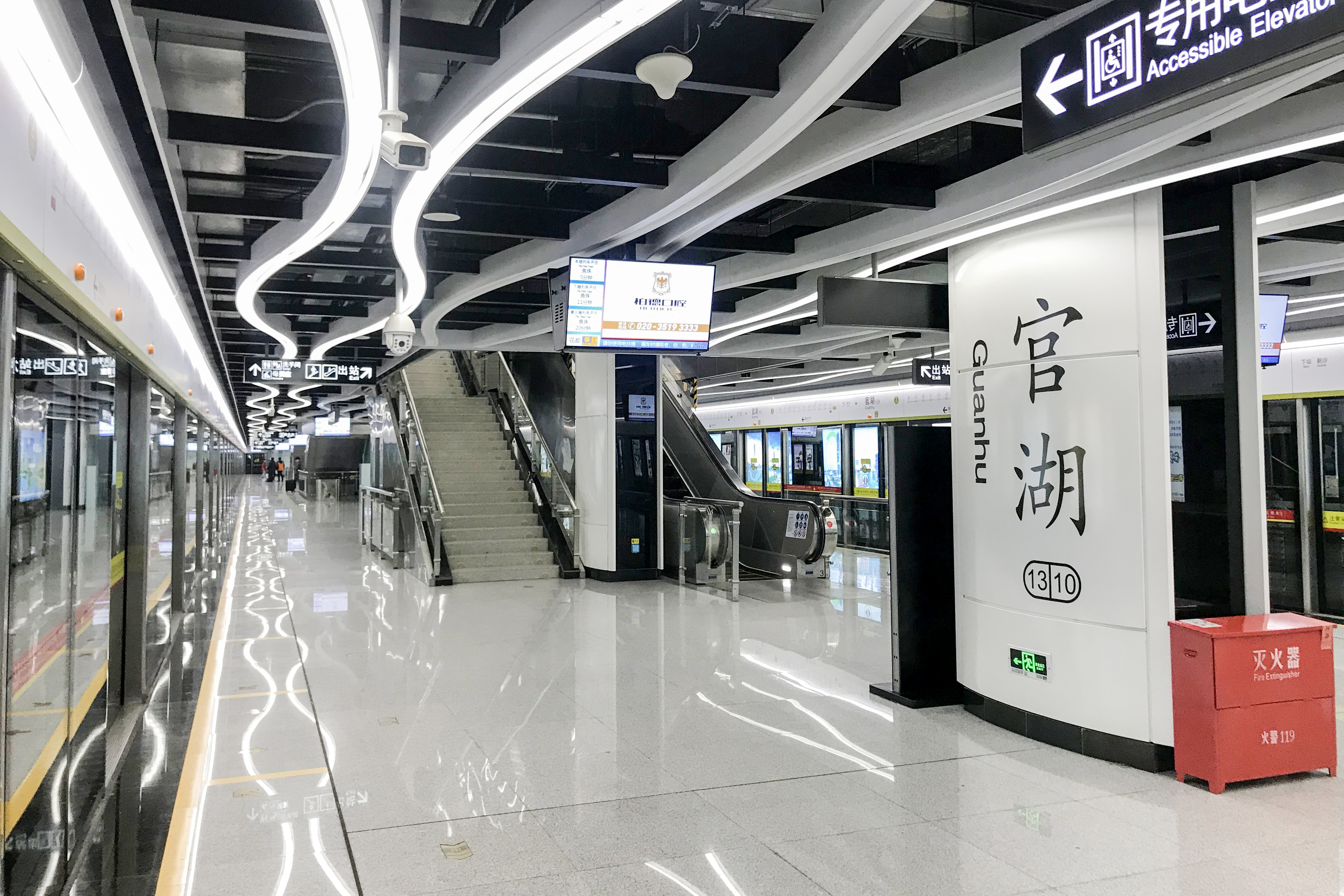

General information
- Location: Xintang, Zengcheng District, Guangzhou, Guangdong; China
- Operator: Guangzhou Metro Co. Ltd.
- Line: Line 13

Construction
- Structure type: Underground

Other information
- Station code: 1333

History
- Opened: 28 December 2017; 8 years ago

Services
| Preceding station | Guangzhou Metro | Following station |
|---|---|---|
| Xintang towards Tianhe Park | Line 13 | Xinsha Terminus |
Location

Guanhu station (Chinese: 官湖站; pinyin: Guānhú Zhàn; Jyutping: gun^{1}wu^{4} zaam^{6}) is a station of Line 13 of the Guangzhou Metro. It started operations on 28 December 2017.

== Station layout ==
| G | - | Exits |
| L1; Concourse | Lobby | Customer Service, Vending machines, ATMs |
| L2; Platforms | Platform 2 | 13 towards Tianhe Park (Xintang) |
| L2; Platforms | Island platform, doors will open on the left |
| L2; Platforms | Platform 1 | 13 towards Xinsha (Terminus) |

== Exits ==
| Exit number | Exit location |
|---|---|
| Exit A | Huancheng Lu |
| Exit B | Huancheng Lu |
