= Xintang station (Guangzhou Metro) =

Guangzhou Metro station

Coordinates: 23°07′54″N 113°36′16″E

Xintang 新塘
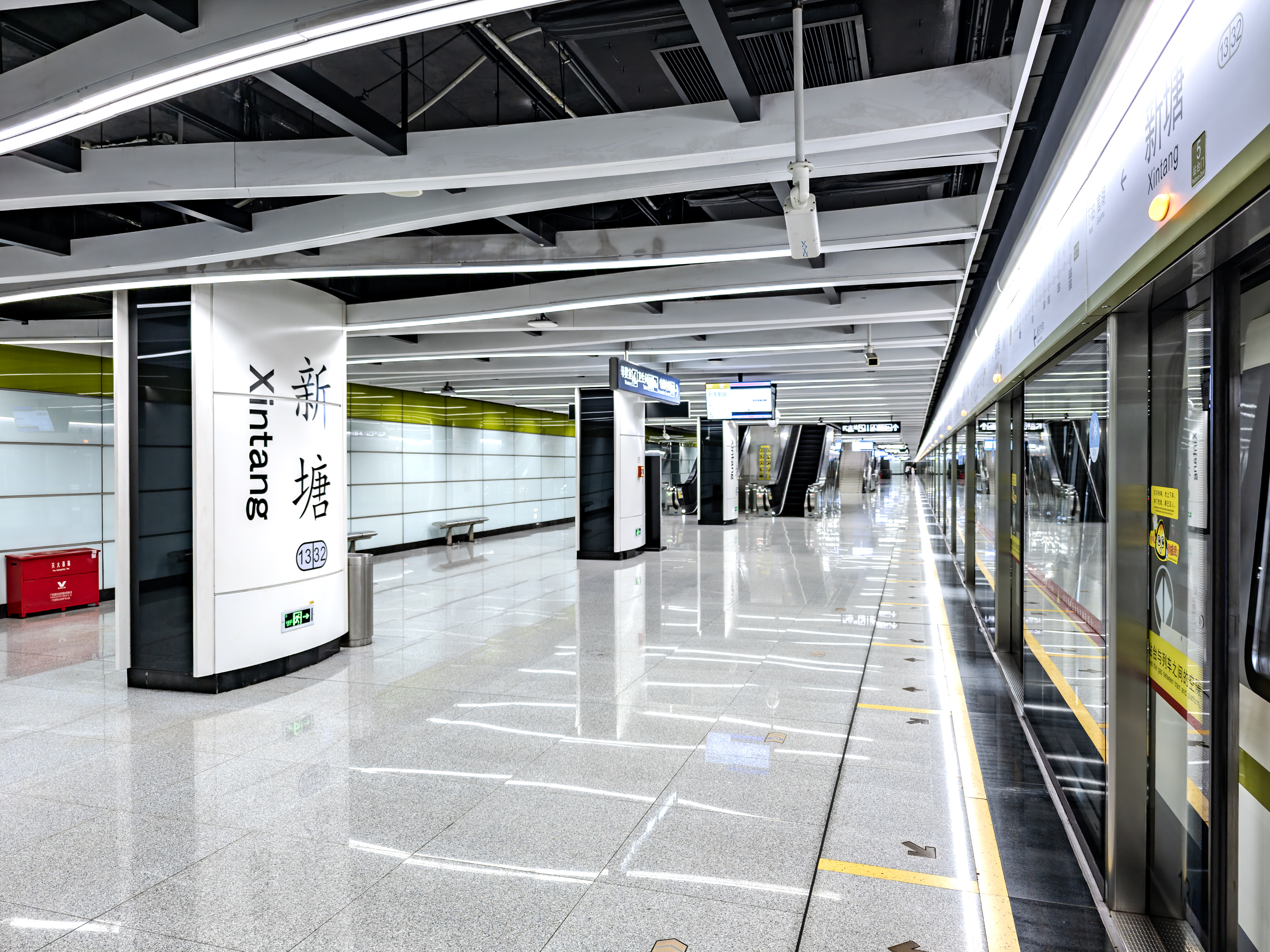

General information
- Location: Xintang, Zengcheng District, Guangzhou, Guangdong; China
- Operator: Guangzhou Metro Co. Ltd.
- Line: Line 13
- Connections: Guangzhou Xintang railway station

Construction
- Structure type: Underground
- Accessible: Yes

Other information
- Station code: 1332

History
- Opened: 28 December 2017; 8 years ago

Services
Preceding station	Guangzhou Metro	Following station
Baijiang towards Tianhe Park	Line 13	Guanhu towards Xinsha
Route map
Location
- Map

Xintang station (Chinese: 新塘站; pinyin: Xīntáng Zhàn; Jyutping: san^{1}tong^{4} zaam^{6}), is a station of Line 13 of the Guangzhou Metro. It started operations on 28 December 2017. The station serves the Guangzhou Xintang railway station and the surrounding area, with the station box itself located to the south of the railway station.

== History ==
A station serving the Xintang railway station first appeared in the 2003 plan for the Guangzhou Metro. At that time, it was the terminus of Line 5 connecting the Guangzhou-Shenzhen Railway. The plan for the station underwent many modifications - first becoming an intermediate station on a plan for Line 14, eventually becoming designated as a transfer station between Line 13 and Line 16. Construction began along with the rest of the first phase of Line 13.

In November 2015, the main structure of this site was capped. On December 28, 2017, this station was opened with the opening of the first phase of Line 13.

Construction was completed in November 2015, with the station opening along with the rest of the first phase of Line 13 on December 28, 2017.

On May 22, 2020, the station was closed along with the rest of Line 13 due to extreme rainfall in the area. It reopened on June 13 with the resumption of services between Shacun and Xinsha.

Due to construction on the railway station, on December 7, 2022, the E1 exit was temporarily closed with the new exit C being put into operation. On September 26, 2023, exits E1-E3 and a new pedestrian passageway to the railway station opened along with the opening of the new Xintang Station.

== Future ==
=== Line 16 ===
Line 16 will eventually serve the inner tracks of the Xintang station, creating a same-direction cross-platform transfer. Space for Line 16 has already been excavated within the footprint of the existing station, and will be fitted out along with construction of the rest of the line in the future.

=== Line 20 ===
Line 20 will serve the Xintang railway station as well, but on the north side of the railway in its own separate station instead of serving the existing quad-track station on the south side. There will be an out-of-station direct connection between the two stations via a dedicated transfer corridor built underneath the Xintang railway station after recent renovations. Provisions have been built for the Line 20 station where the structure is underneath the existing Xintang station.

=== Line 28 ===
Line 28 is planned to have a station serving the Xintang railway station complex, however this long-term line has not had enough concrete planning for any specifics on location to be released nor provisions to be built.

== Station layout ==
G	-	Exits
L1; Concourse	Lobby	Customer Service, Shops, Vending machines, ATMs
L2; Platforms	Platform 2	13 towards Tianhe Park (Baijiang)
L2; Platforms	Island platform, doors will open on the left
L2; Platforms	Platform	16 Provision
L2; Platforms	Platform	16 Provision
L2; Platforms	Island platform, doors will open on the left
L2; Platforms	Platform 1	13 towards Xinsha (Guanhu)

== Exits ==
Exit letter	Gallery	Exit location	Nearby
C		Gangkou Dadaobei	
D2		Xinxin Dadao	Xinxin Avenue South, Xintang Middle School, Zengcheng District, Guangzhou, Xintang Subway Station Bus Station
E1			Xinxin Avenue South, Xintang Subway Station Bus Terminal
E2			
E3		Guangzhou Xintang railway station	Guangzhou Xintang Railway Station (Exit), Xintang Station Bus Terminal
E4		Guangzhou Xintang railway station	
E5		Guangzhou Xintang railway station	
