= List of public transport routes numbered 16 =

In public transport, Route 16 may refer to:

- Route 16 (MTA Maryland), a bus route in Baltimore, Maryland and its suburbs
- London Buses route 16
- Melbourne tram route 16

== See also ==
- Line 16 (disambiguation)
