= Line 16 (Guangzhou Metro) =

Line of the Guangzhou Metro

- 16

Overview
- Native name: 广州地铁16号线
- Status: Planned
- Owner: City of Guangzhou
- Termini: Xintang; Lichengbei
- Stations: 14

Service
- Type: Rapid transit
- System: Guangzhou Metro
- Operator(s): Guangzhou Metro Corporation

Technical
- Line length: 38.4 km (23.86 mi)
- Character: Underground and At-grade
- Track gauge: 1,435 mm (4 ft 8 1/2 in)
- Operating speed: 120 km/h (74.56 mph)

Line 16 of the Guangzhou Metro is a planned rapid transit line in Guangzhou, China. It will be 38.4 kilometres (23.9 mi) long and will have 14 stations. The line will connect Xintang (Chinese: 新塘) and Lichengjie (Chinese: 荔城街), 2 major areas with the strongest economy and largest population in the Zengcheng District. The line is planned to connect with Line 4 of Dongguan Rail Transit in the future.

== Rolling stock ==
The line will use six-car trains with a maximum speed of 120 kilometres per hour (75 mph).

== Stations ==
Station No.	Station name		Connections	Future Connections	Location
Station No.	English	Chinese	Connections	Future Connections	Location
	Xintang	新塘	13 1332 SS	28	Zengcheng
	Xintang Coach Terminal	新塘客运站			Zengcheng
	Shapu	沙埔			Zengcheng
	Xiancun	仙村			Zengcheng
	Lanshan (reserved station)	蓝山			Zengcheng
	Shitanxi	石滩西			Zengcheng
	Shitan	石滩			Zengcheng
	Zengcheng Railway Station	增城火车站			Zengcheng
	Hanglu New Town South	挂绿新城南			Zengcheng
	Children's Palace	少年宫			Zengcheng
	Zengcheng Square	增城广场	21 2121		Zengcheng
	Licheng	荔城			Zengcheng
	Fupeng Lu	富鹏路			Zengcheng
	Lichengbei	荔城北			Zengcheng
