= Xinsha station =

Guangzhou Metro station

Coordinates: 23°08′13″N 113°38′58″E

Xinsha 新沙
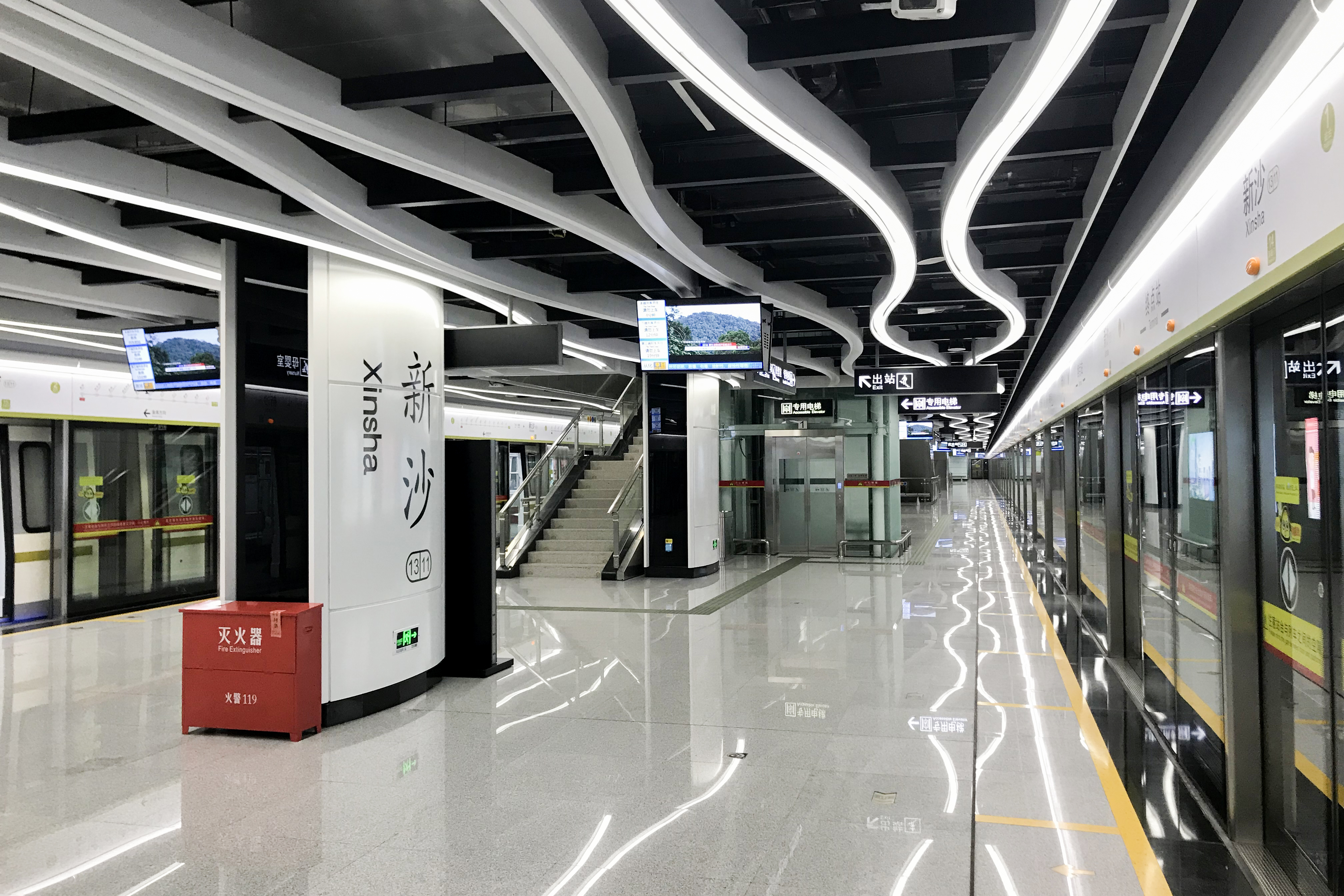
- Platform 1 (termination platform)

General information
- Location: North Xinsha Avenue (新沙大道北); Zengcheng District, Guangzhou, Guangdong; China
- Operator: Guangzhou Metro Co. Ltd.
- Line: Line 13

Construction
- Structure type: Underground

Other information
- Station code: 1334

History
- Opened: 28 December 2017; 8 years ago

Services
Preceding station	Guangzhou Metro	Following station
Guanhu towards Tianhe Park	Line 13	Terminus
Location

Xinsha station (Chinese: 新沙站; pinyin: Xīnshā Zhàn; Jyutping: san^{1}saa^{1} zaam^{6}) is a station and the current eastern terminus of Line 13 of the Guangzhou Metro. It started operations on 28 December 2017.

== Station layout ==
G	-	Exits
L1; Concourse	Lobby	Customer Service, Vending machines, ATMs
L2; Platforms	Platform 2	13 towards Tianhe Park (Guanhu)
L2; Platforms	Island platform, doors will open on the left
L2; Platforms	Platform 1	13 termination platform

== Exits ==
Exit number	Exit location
Exit A	Xinsha Dadaobei
Exit C	Xinsha Dadaobei
Exit D	Xinsha Dadaobei
