= Guangzhou Xintang railway station =

Railway station in Zengcheng, Guangzhou, China

Coordinates: 23.1334°N 113.6033°E

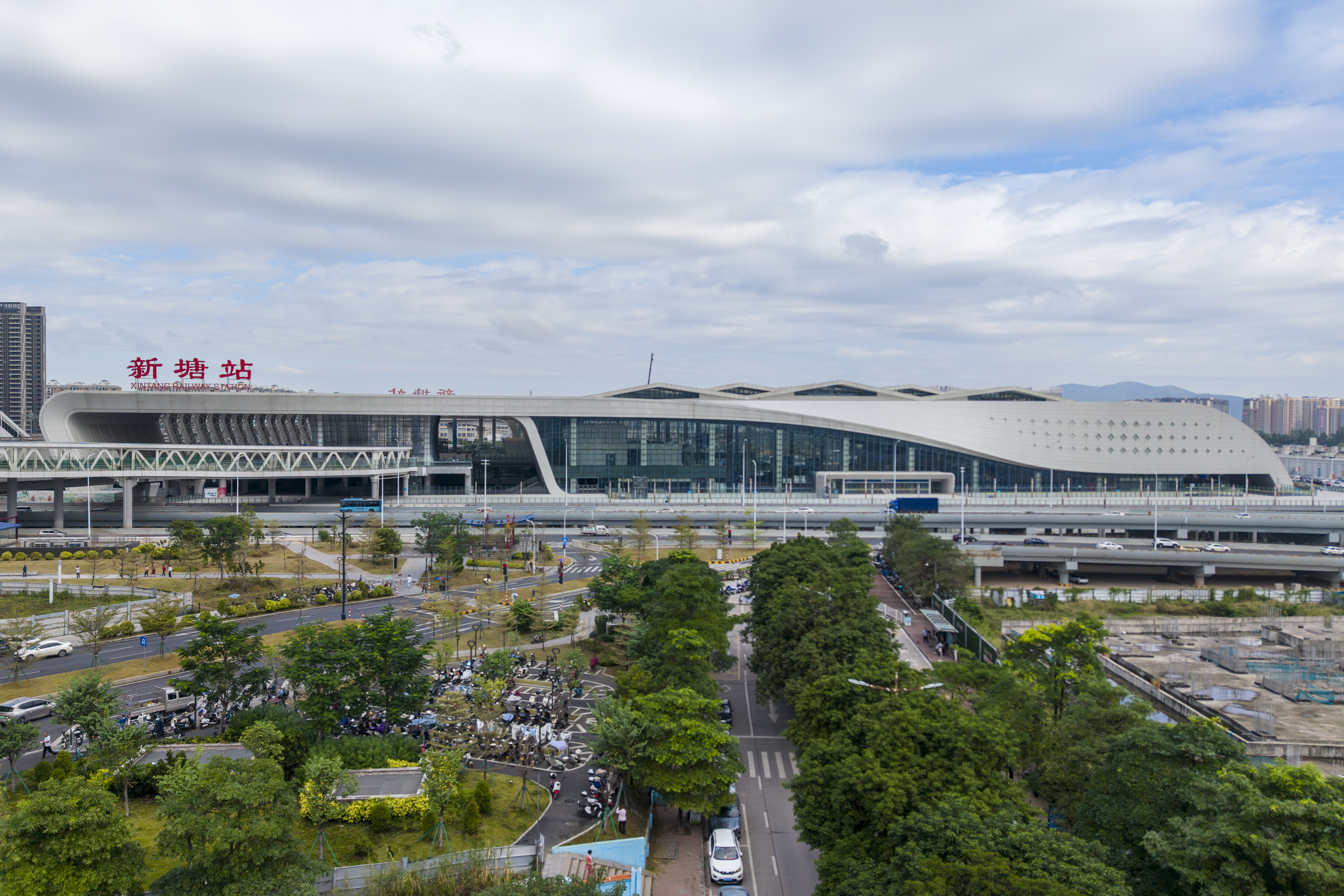
Guangzhou Xintang railway station in 2024

Guangzhou Xintang railway station (Chinese: 广州新塘站; pinyin: Guǎngzhōu Xīntáng zhàn; Jyutping: Gwong2 zau1 San1 tong4 zaam6) is a railway station in Xintang, Zengcheng District, Guangzhou, Guangdong Province, China. It is a station on the Guangzhou–Shenzhen railway and the Guangzhou–Shanwei high-speed railway. It was known as Xintang North in 2018-2019, and renamed from Xintang to Guangzhou Xintang on 11 October 2025.

Xintang railway station was built in 1910 and is now a class 4 station on the national railway station scale.

== See also ==
- Xintang South railway station, a station on Guangzhou–Shenzhen intercity railway, located near Xintang railway station
- Xintang station (Guangzhou Metro), a metro station on Line 13 of Guangzhou Metro, located near Xintang railway station

Preceding station	China Railway	Following station
Xiayuan towards Guangzhou	Guangzhou–Shenzhen railway	Shapu towards Shenzhen
