= Tianhe Park station =

Guangzhou Metro Lines 11, 13 and 21 station

Tianhe Park 天河公园
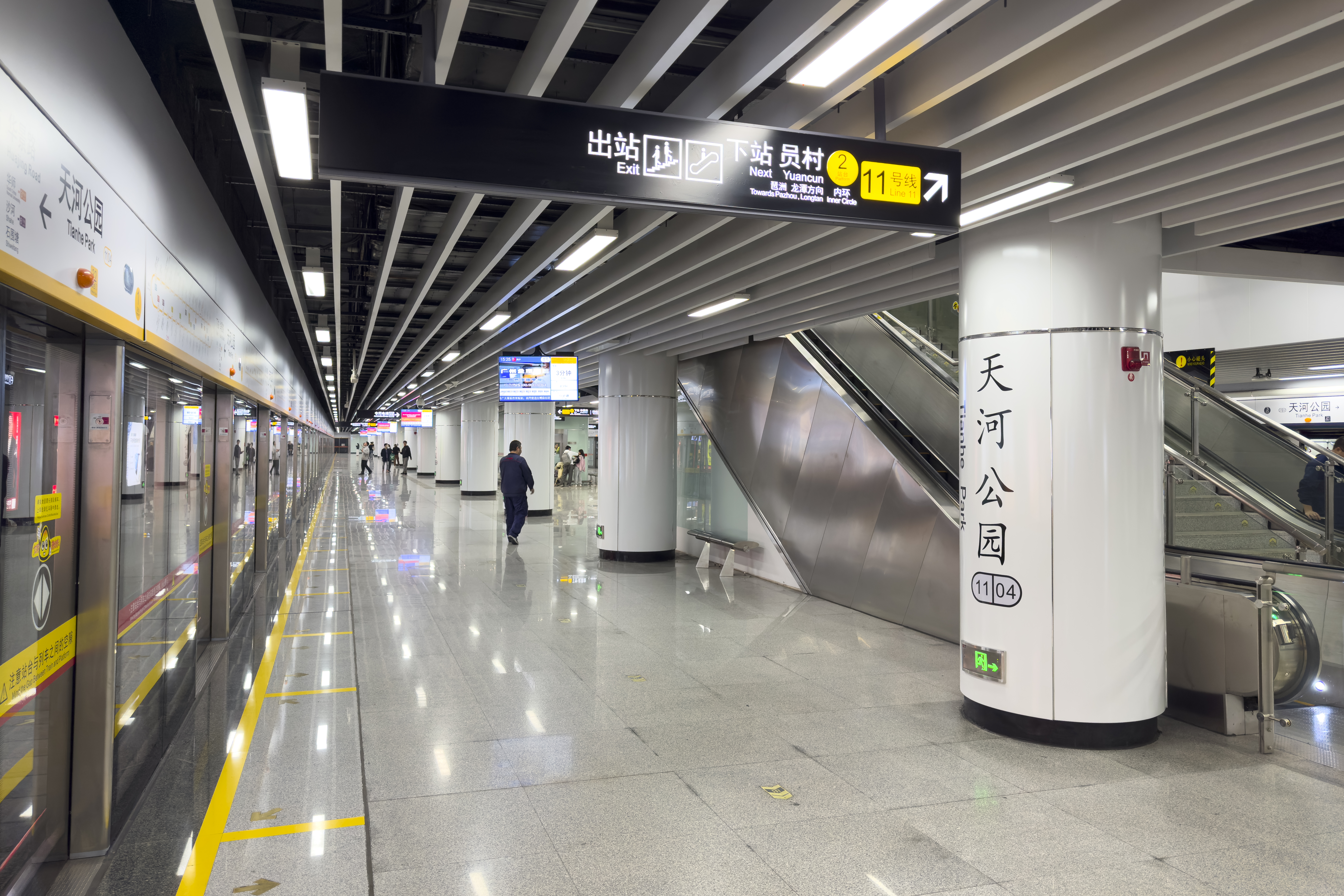
- Platform 1 (Line 11 Outer Circle platform)

Chinese name
- Simplified Chinese: 天河公园站
- Traditional Chinese: 天河公園站
Transcriptions
Standard Mandarin
- Hanyu Pinyin: Tiānhé Gōngyuán Zhàn
Yue: Cantonese
- Yale Romanization: Tīnhòh Gūng'yún Jaahm
- Jyutping: Tin^{1}ho^{4} Gung^{1}jyun^{4} Zaam^{6}

General information
- Location: Tianhe Park, northeast side of intsersection of Huangpu Avenue (黄埔大道) and Tianfu Road (天府路), Tianyuan Subdistrict; Tianhe District, Guangzhou, Guangdong; China
- Coordinates: 23°7′52″N 113°21′36″E
- Operator: Guangzhou Metro Co. Ltd.
- Lines: Line 11; Line 13; Line 21
- Platforms: 8 (3 island platforms and 2 side platforms)
- Tracks: 6

Construction
- Structure type: Underground
- Accessible: Yes

Other information
- Station code: 1104 1320 2102

History
- Opened: Line 21: 20 December 2019 (6 years ago); Line 11: 28 December 2024 (22 months ago); Line 13: 29 September 2025 (13 months ago)

Services
Preceding station	Guangzhou Metro	Following station
Huajing Road Outer Circle	Line 11	Yuancun Inner Circle
Terminus	Line 13	Tangxia towards Xinsha
Terminus	Line 21	Tangdong towards Zengcheng Square
Future services (2026)
Yuancun Shanding towards Yagang	Line 13	Tangxia towards Xinsha
Location

Tianhe Park station (simplified Chinese: 天河公园站; traditional Chinese: 天河公園站; pinyin: Tiānhé Gōngyuán Zhàn; Cantonese Yale: Tīnhòh Gūng'yún Jaahm) is an interchange station between Line 11, Line 13 and Line 21 of the Guangzhou Metro, and the western terminus of Line 13 and Line 21. It started operations on 20 December 2019. With the opening of Line 11, Line 21 was truncated to here from Yuancun since 2 October 2024, as to allow renovation works in preparation for Line 11 trains to serve that station instead. Line 11 started serving this station on 28 December 2024.

Prior to the opening of Line 11, the dismantling work of the section from this station to Yuancun of Line 21 began on 2 October 2024. The southern terminus of Line 21 was adjusted north to this station, and platforms 3 and 4 on the inner platforms were put in use, whilst platforms 1 and 2 on the outer platforms were temporarily suspended. The 6B train type's shielding doors and glass panel false walls of the outer platform were removed, and then the appropriate shielding doors of the 8A train type were installed. At the same time, it was necessary to dismantle the outer platform and the third track between the station and the Yuancun station area and replace the signal system to Line 11 standards.

The station became a three-line transfer station when Line 13 started operations on 29 September 2025, serving as its interim western terminus.

== Station structure ==
The station's total construction area is 78558 square meters, which is equivalent to 2.3 Gongyuanqian stations and 3.3 Yangji stations. Among them, the total length of the Line 11/21 station is 415 meters, the width of the standard section is 53.1 meters, the total length of the station of Line 13 is 283 meters, the width is 34 meters, and the maximum width of the transfer node is 90 meters. The station is largest station on Guangzhou Metro, and is also currently the largest underground metro station in Asia.

In addition, there is a substation next to Exit B on the south side of the station that supplies power to the three lines passing through the station.

=== Platform layout ===
The station has three underground floors. The ground floor is the entrance/exit, and it is surrounded by Huangpu Avenue, Tianfu Road, Yuancun Erheng Road, Tianhe Park, Tianhe District Government and nearby buildings. The first floor is the concourse, the second floor are the Line 11 and Line 21 platforms, and the third floor are the Line 13 platforms.

The station has four toilets and nursery rooms in the concourse and platform, of which for the concourse, there is one located near Exit D on the Line 13 concourse. There are ones also located at the north end of the two island platforms of Line 11/21, and there is also one at the eastern end of the Line 13 platform.

G	-	Exits B, C, D, E1, E2, F
L1	Lobby	Ticket Machines, Customer Service, Shops, Police Station, Security Facilities
L2; 11 and 21 Platforms	Platform 2	11 Inner Circle (Yuancun)
L2; 11 and 21 Platforms	Island platform, doors will open on the left for 11 and right for 21 (Toilets, Nursery)
L2; 11 and 21 Platforms	Platform 4	21 termination platform
	Platform 3	21 towards Zengcheng Square (Tangdong)
Island platform, doors will open on the left for 11 and right for 21 (Toilets, Nursery)
	Platform 1	11 Outer Circle (Huajing Road)
Mezzanine	Transfer level	Towards Line 13 from Line 11 and 21 platforms
L3; 13 Platforms
L3; 13 Platforms	Side platform, doors will open on the right for alighting only (not in use)
L3; 13 Platforms	Platform 8 ↑ Platform 6 ↓	13 termination platform
L3; 13 Platforms	Island platform, doors will open on the left (Toilets, Nursery)
L3; 13 Platforms	Platform 5 ↑ Platform 7 ↓	13 towards Xinsha (Tangxia)
L3; 13 Platforms	Side platform, doors will open on the right for alighting only (not in use)

=== Concourse ===
The concourse is divided into two parts: Line 11/21 and Line 13. There are automatic ticket vending machines and intelligent customer service centers, and shops on both the north and south sides of the non-fare paid area. Since 2026, shops were also set up within the paid area, and a pickleball center will be located on the north side of the Line 13 concourse.

To facilitate entry/exit and transfer, the center of the Line 11/21 concourse and the southeast side of the Line 13 concourse are divided into fare-paid areas, each with an elevator and multiple sets of escalators and stairs connecting their respective platforms.

The design of the Line 13 concourse uses "Vast Sky, Tianhe Star Rain" as the theme concept, and uses geometric forms to construct a gray-based tone, outlining light and shadow lines through linear light strips. The starry sky pattern is also used as a theme element to form a staggered and overlapping ceiling shape, forming an artistic conception of "vast starry sky" with dotted starlights.

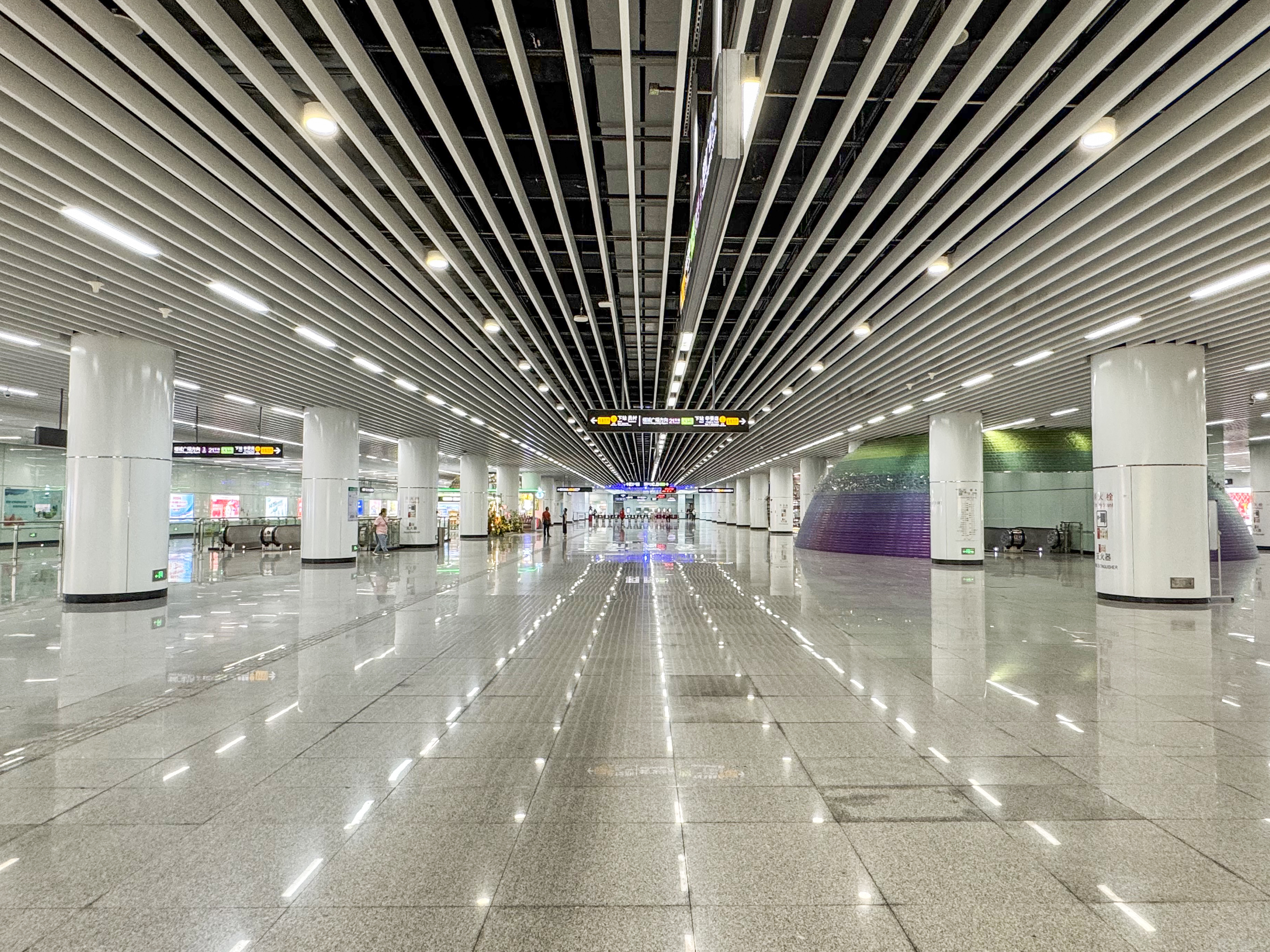
Line 11/21 concourse

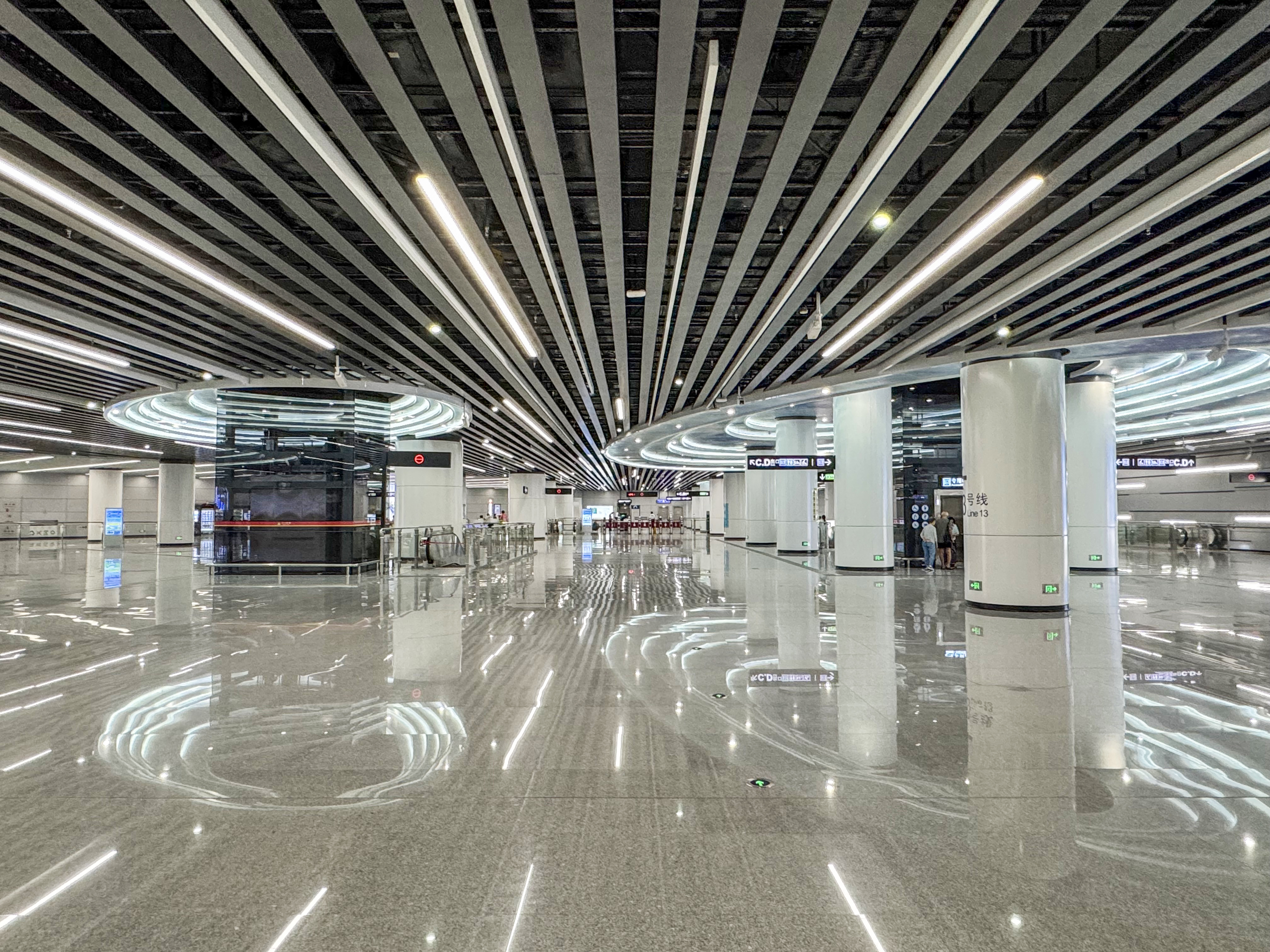
Line 13 concourse

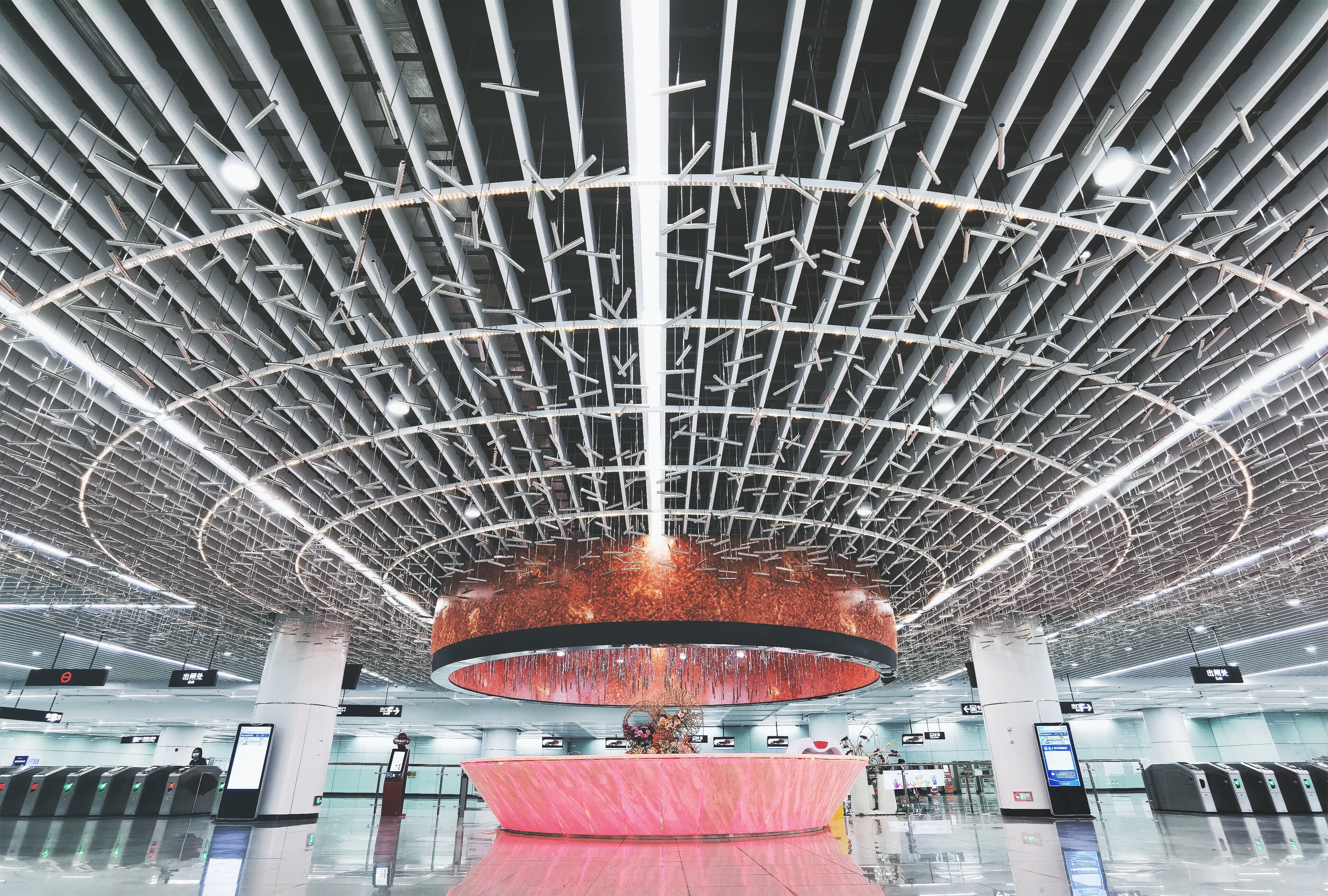
Customer service center on the south side of the Line 11/21 concourse

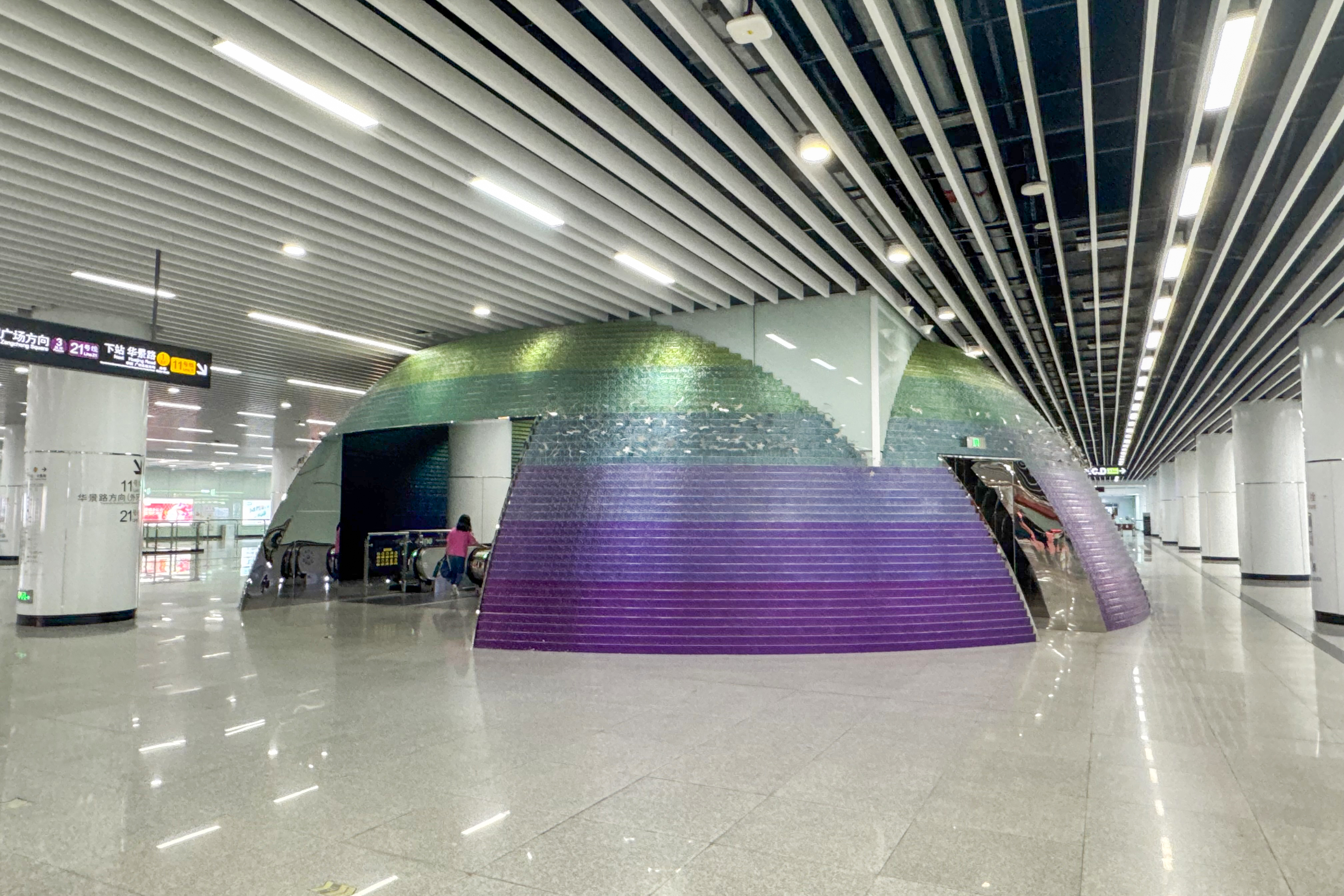
The escalators and stairs towards Platforms 1 and 3 of Lines 11 and 21 on the concourse adopt a candy-shaped design with circular vaults

The elevators connecting the concourse to the platforms of Lines 11 and 21 also feature a circular arched ceiling design

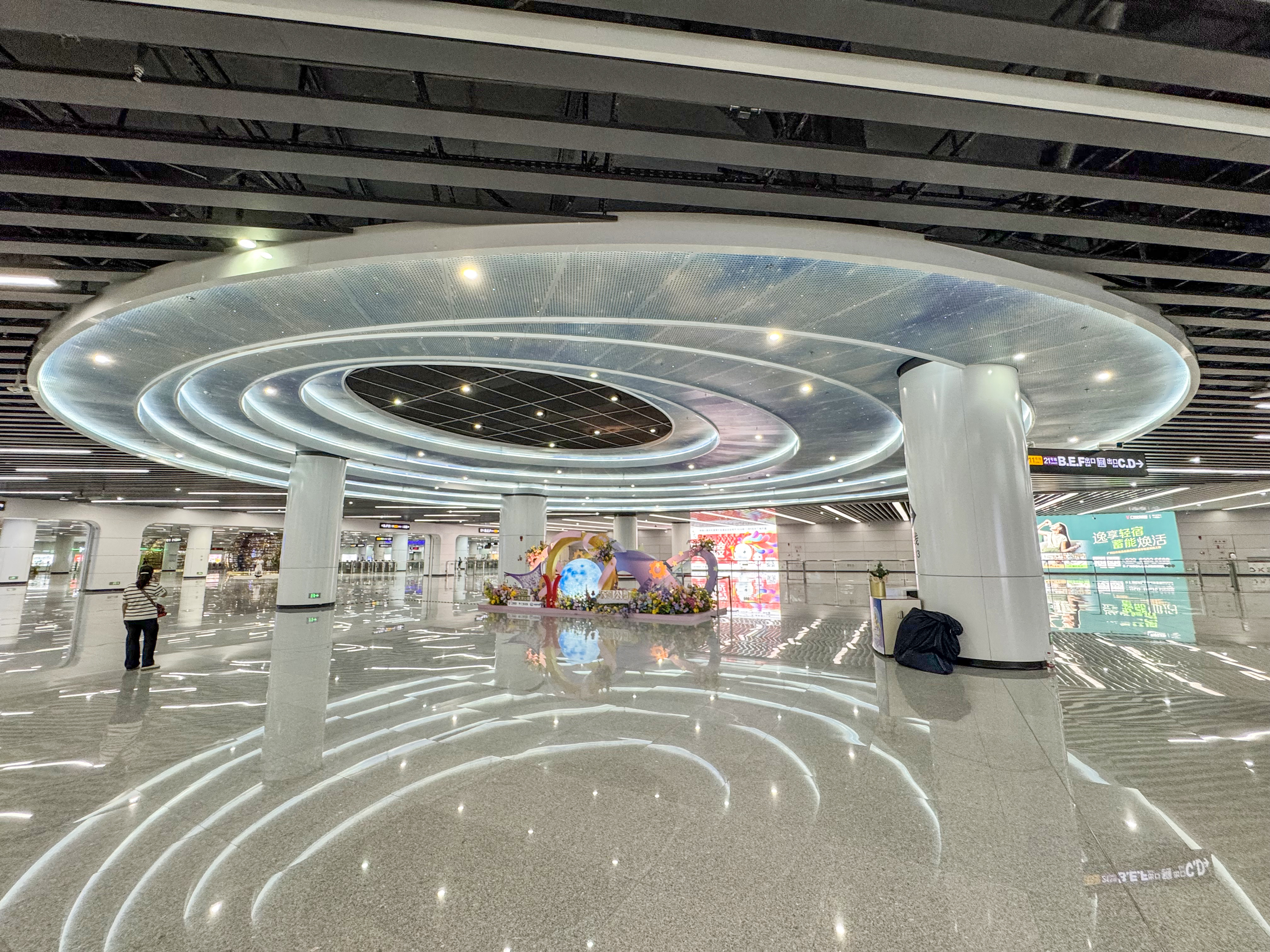
The ceiling design of part of the Line 13 concourse is based on the theme of "Vast Sky, Tianhe Star Rain"

=== Transfer method ===
Passengers can walk to the opposite platform and transfer directly to another train to their destination (e.g., transfer to the outer circle train of Line 11 to the Zengcheng Square bound train on Line 21), or transfer to another train to their destination via the concourse (e.g., transfer to the outer circle train of Line 11 from the terminating Line 21 platform).

In terms of transferring for Line 13, Line 11 and Line 21 can transfer to the island platform of Line 13 through the node at the south end of the two platforms to the lower transfer platform, but Line 13 can only transfer through the concourse to the two lines.

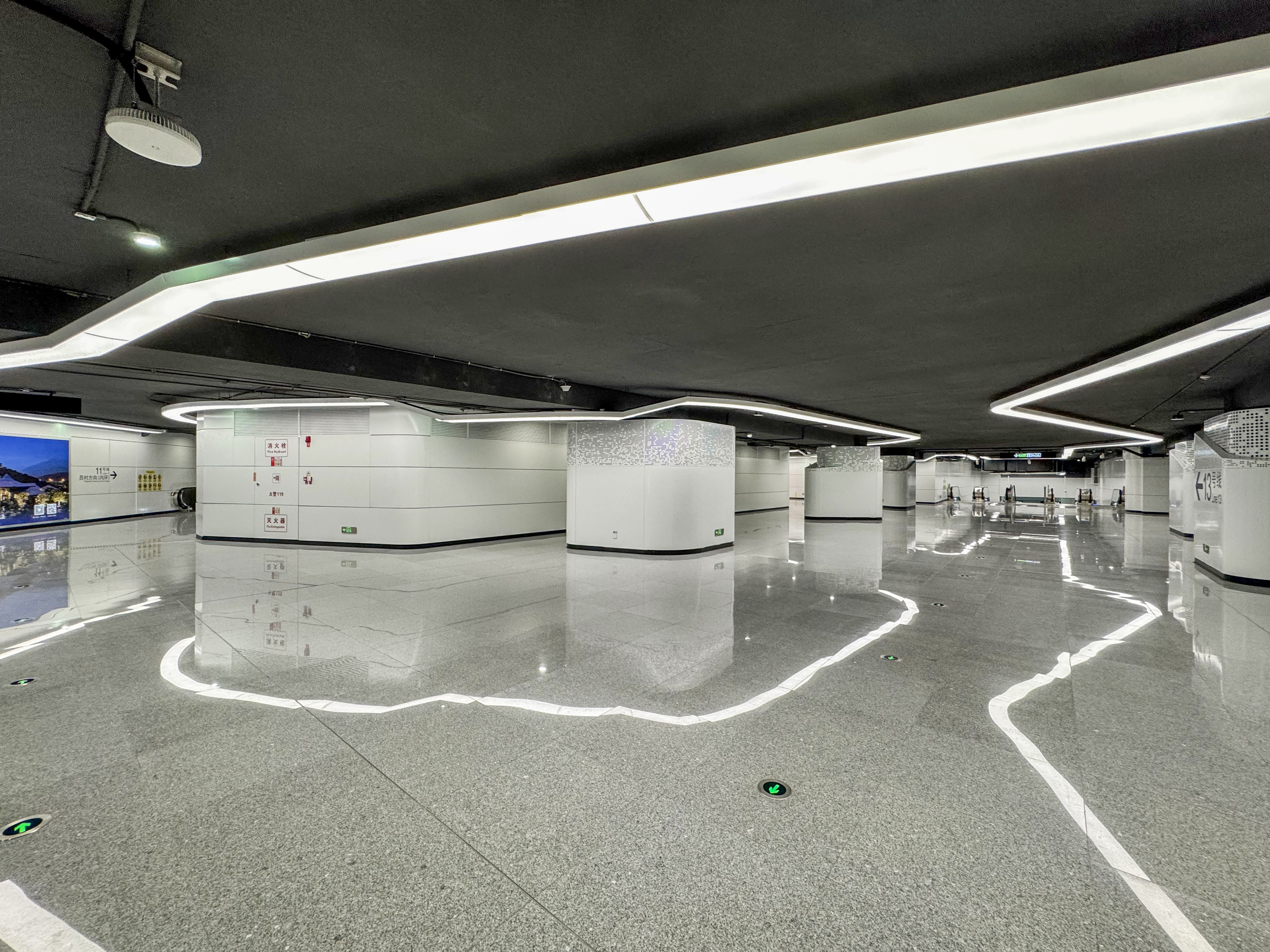
The transfer level between the Line 11/21 island platform and the Line 13 island platform

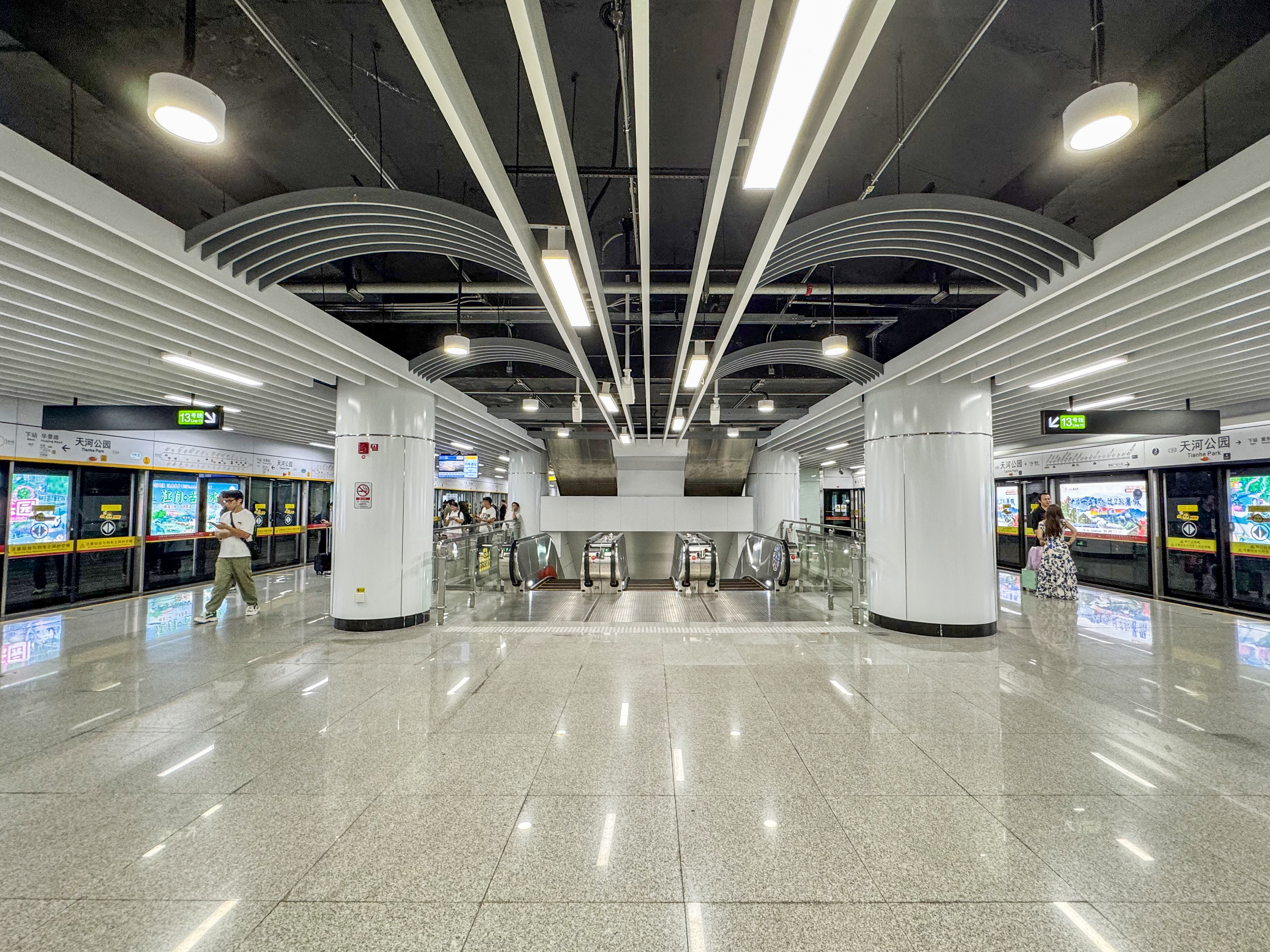
The island platform on the east side of the Line 11/21 platform leads to the escalators on the transfer level

Escalators at the west end of the Line 13 island platform connecting to the transfer level

=== Platforms ===
The station has 3 island platforms and 2 side platforms, all of which are underground. Lines 11 and 21 of this station share a double-island platform on the second floor, located on the west side of Tianhe Park under Tianfu Road. Line 11 uses platforms 1 and 2 on the outside, and Line 21 uses platforms 3 and 4 on the inside. Platform 1 is for Line 11 inner circle trains while platform is for Line 11 outer circle trains. Platform 3 is for trains heading to Zengcheng Square, whilst platform 4 is for terminating trains. Formerly before Line 11 commenced passenger service, Line 21 trains would head to Yuancun from platform 2 and from Yuancun to platform 1. Both platforms 1 and 2 were closed from 2 October 2024 to 27 December 2024 to facilitate the transition from Line 21 back to Line 11.

Line 13 has a set of Spanish-style platforms on the third floor, located underground in the southwest corner of Tianhe Park. In the early days of the opening of the initial section of the second phase of Line 13, only the eastbound track (platforms 5 and 7) was used for boarding and disembarking, and the westbound track (platforms 6 and 8) was used to park spare trains.

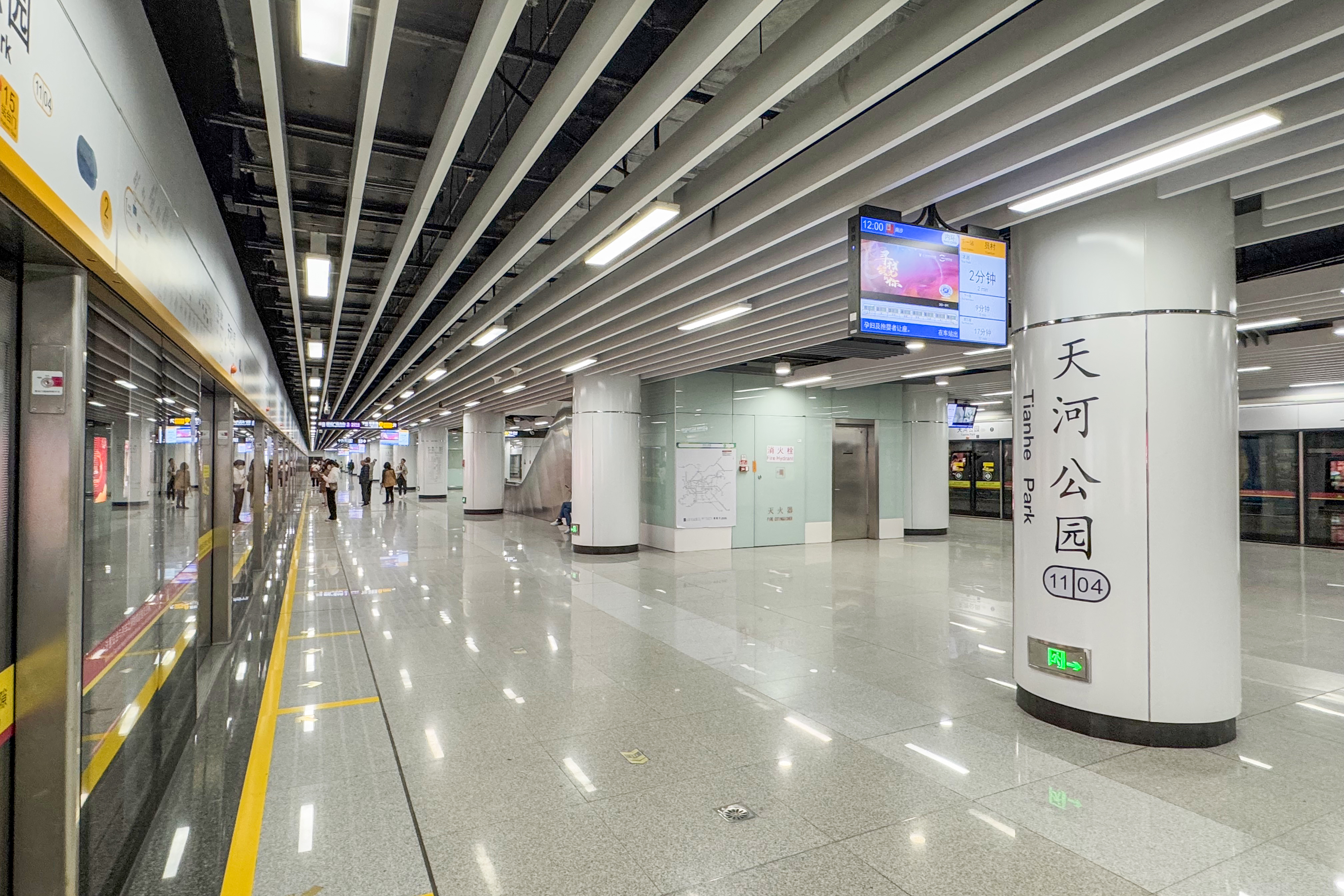
Platform 2 (Line 11 inner circle platform)

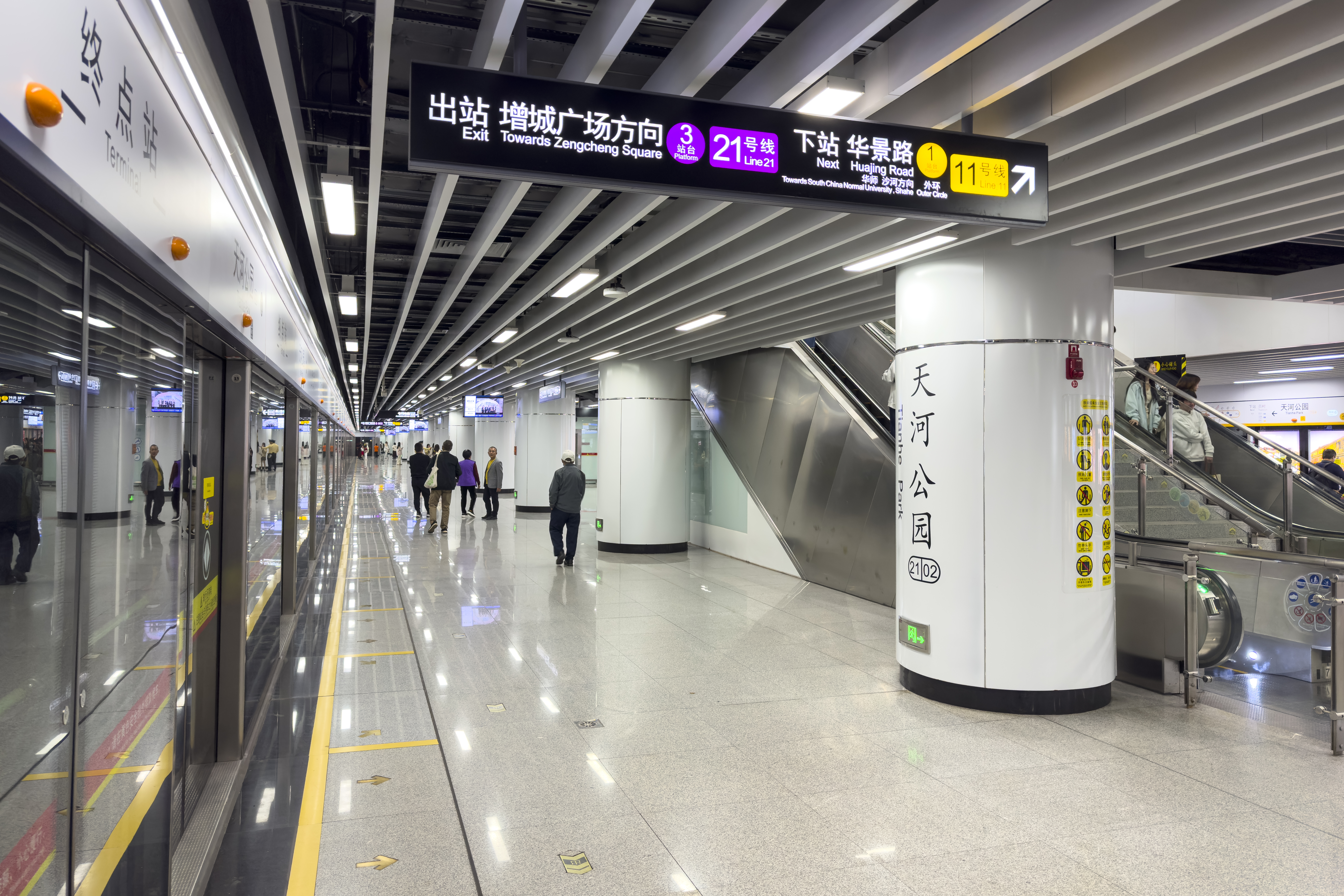
Platform 4 (Line 21 termination platform)

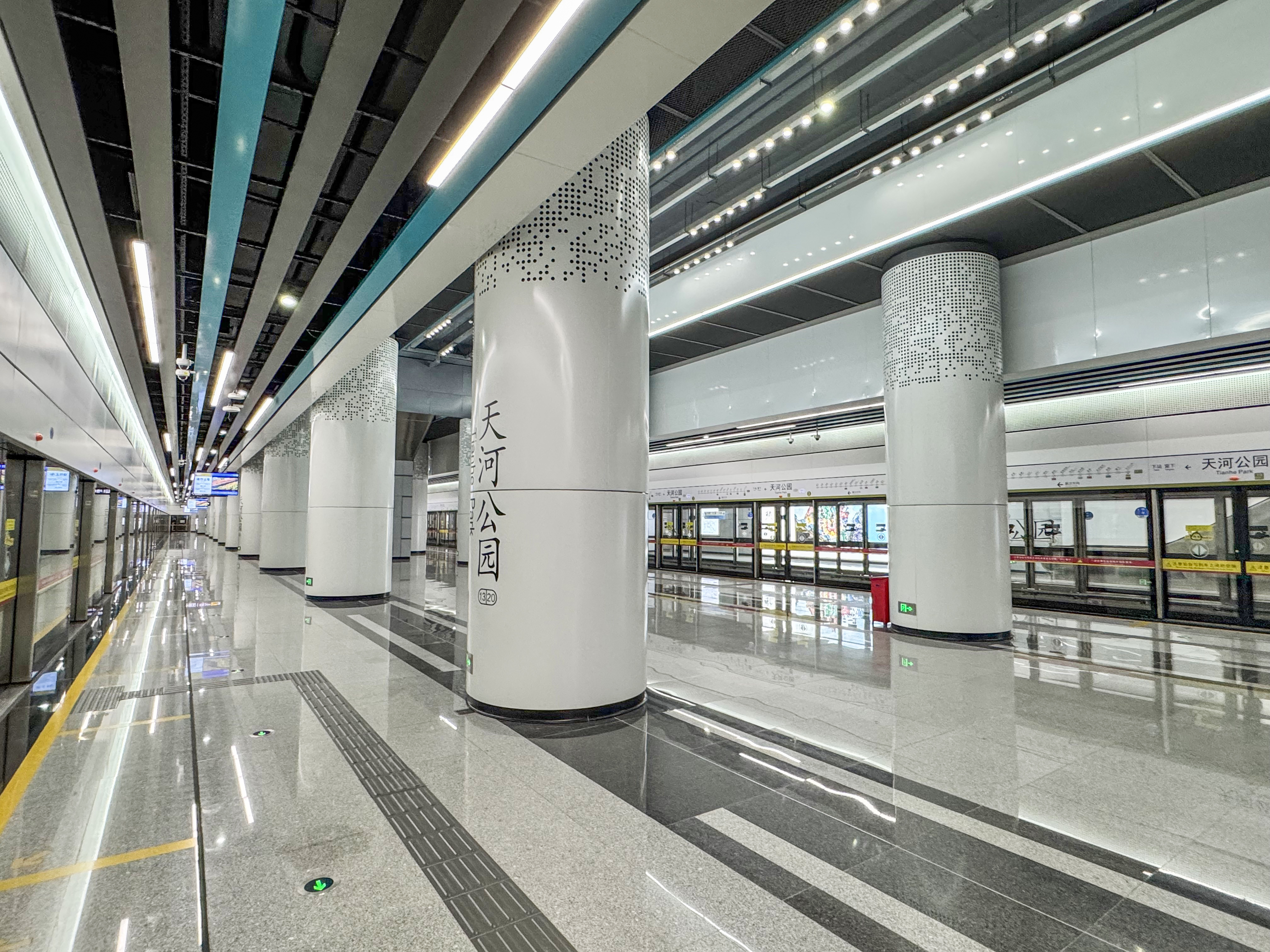
Line 13 island platform

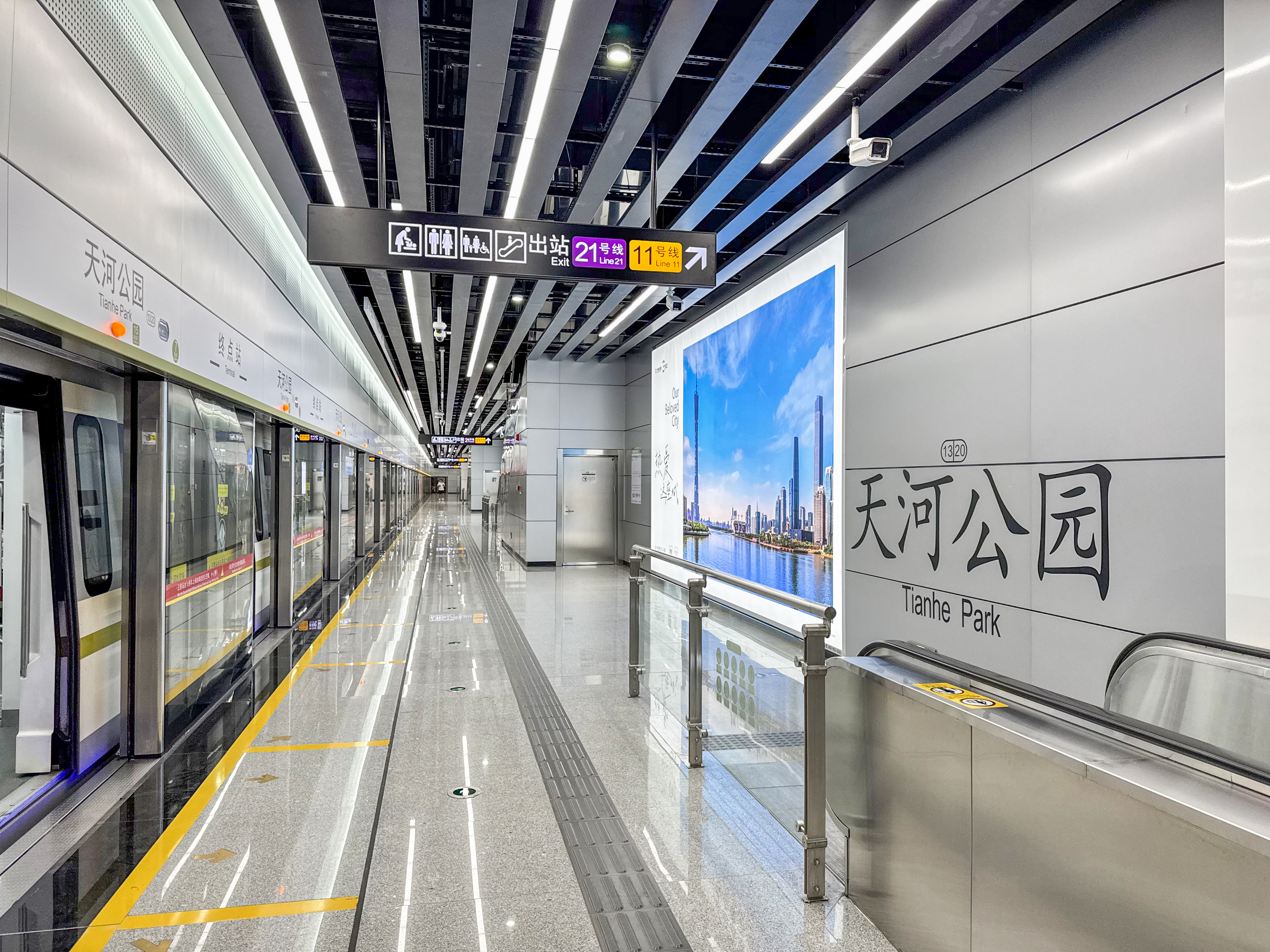
Platform 7 (Line 13 eastbound side platform)

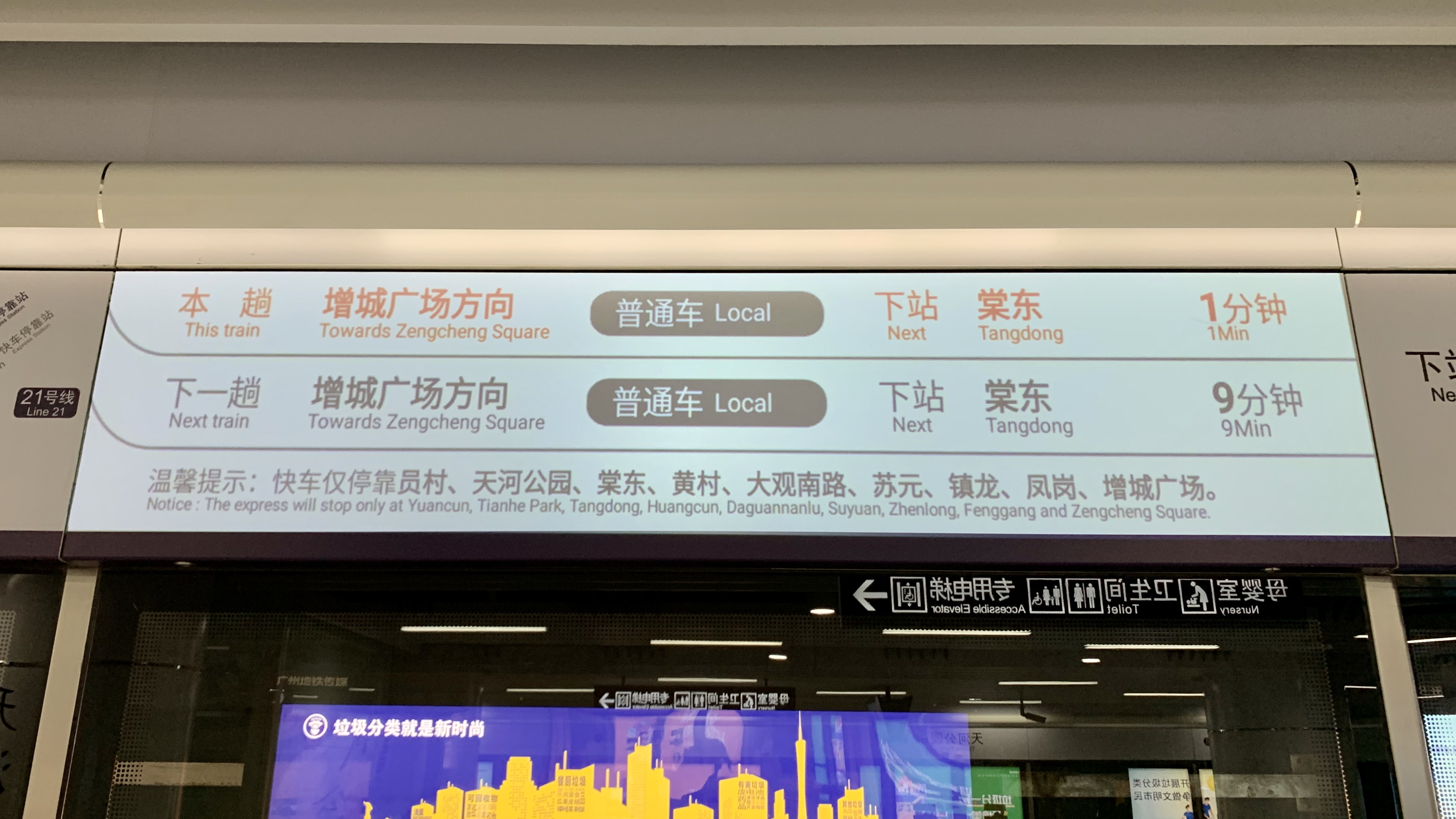
Platform 1 projection showing both local and express trains (prior to renovation)

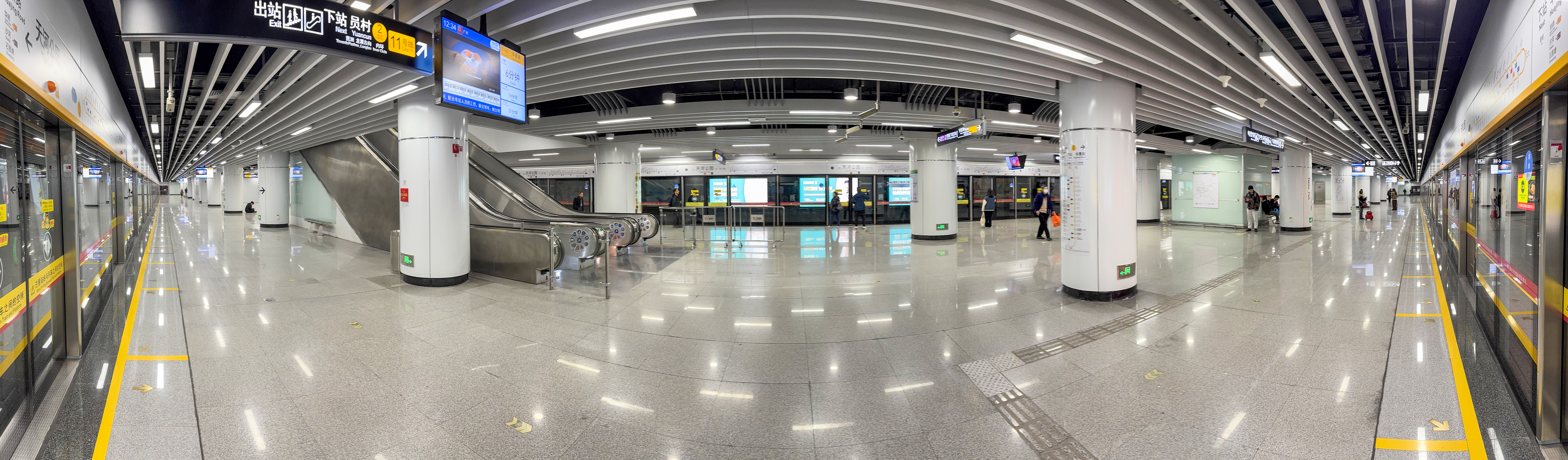
Platform 1 panorama (Line 11 Outer Circle platform)

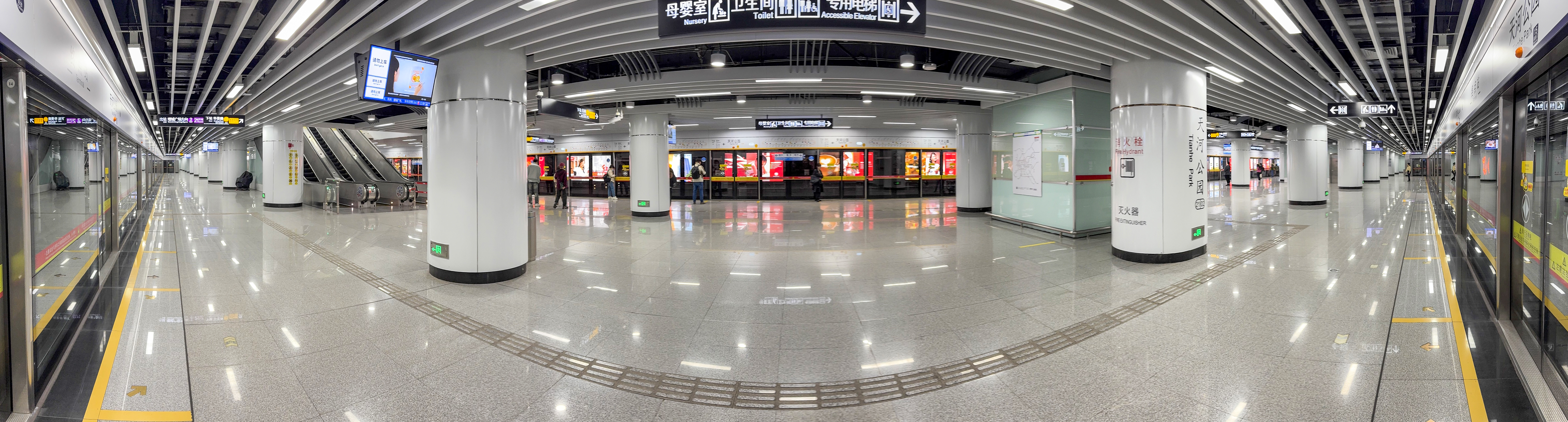
Platform 4 panorama (Line 21 alighting platform)
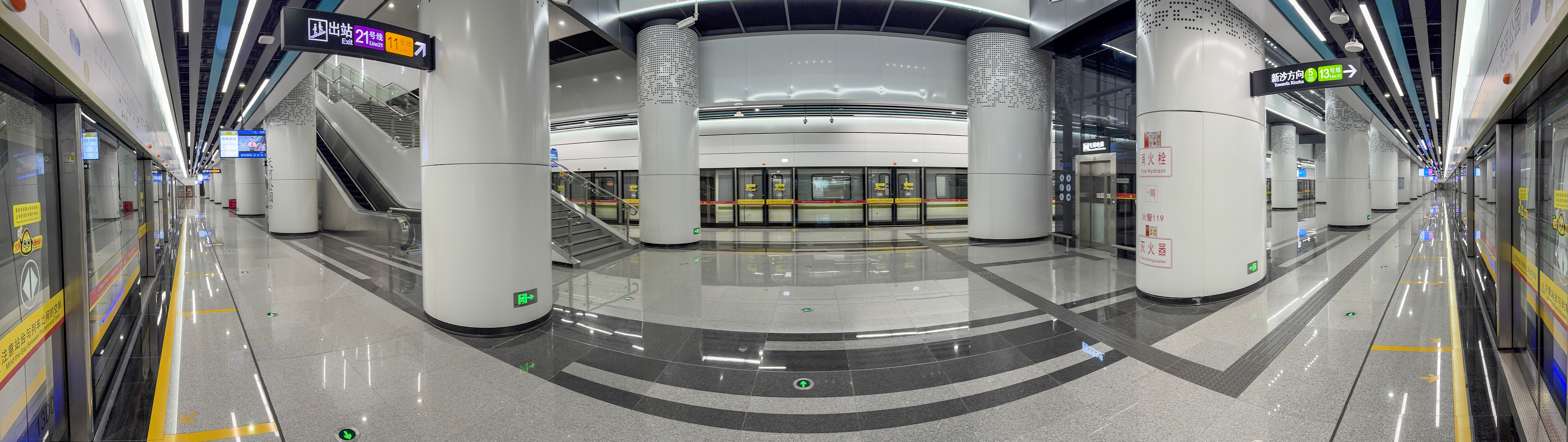
Platform 5 panorama (Line 13 eastbound island platform)
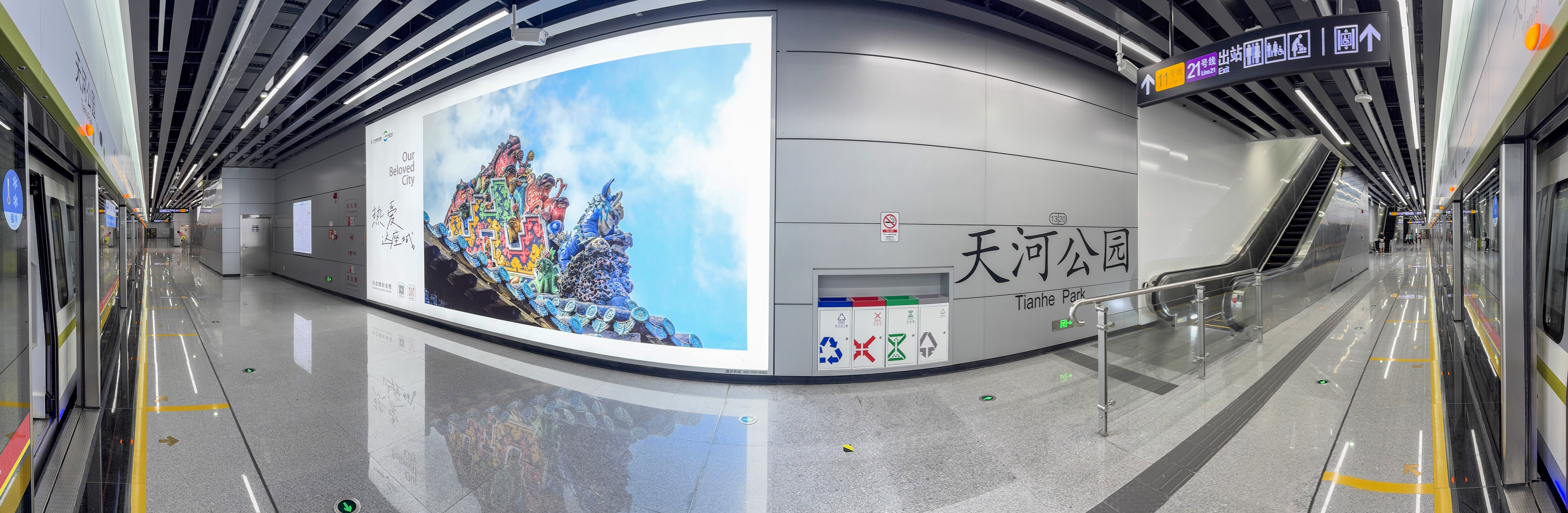
Platform 7 panorama (Line 13 eastbound side platform)

=== Line configuration ===
There is a single crossover line at the northern end of Line 21 Station for trains on Line 21 to turnback before reaching the station when they need to dispatch from this station, and there are two other single crossover lines connecting Line 11 and Line 21 nearby, which were used in the early days of Line 21 to enter the outside borrowing platforms 1 and 2 of Line 11 and borrow the section of Line 11 to Yuancun. Line 21 at the southern end of the platform has a crossover line for trains to turnback after stopping at the station when the train is in normal operation.

On the northeast side of the platform of Line 13, that is, under the artificial lake of Tianhe Park, there are three storage tracks. In addition to a set of dual storage lines, the other line of the dual storage lane extends hundreds of meters to become a double row storage line. This station is currently serving as a temporary terminus of the second phase of Line 13, and trains will turnback before reaching the station through this group of storage lines.

In addition, the connecting lines between Lines 11 and 13 are also located in the northeast quadrant of the station.

=== Entrances/exits ===
The station has 6 points of entry/exit. Exits B, C, D and E1 are equipped with elevators.

- B: Huangpu Avenue Middle, Guangzhou No. 113 Middle School (Financial City East Campus), Tianhe Park South Gate
- C: Tianhe Park
- D: Tianhe Park
- E1: Tianfu Road, Tianhe Park West Gate
- E2: Tianfu Road, Tianhe District People's Government
- F: Tianfu Road
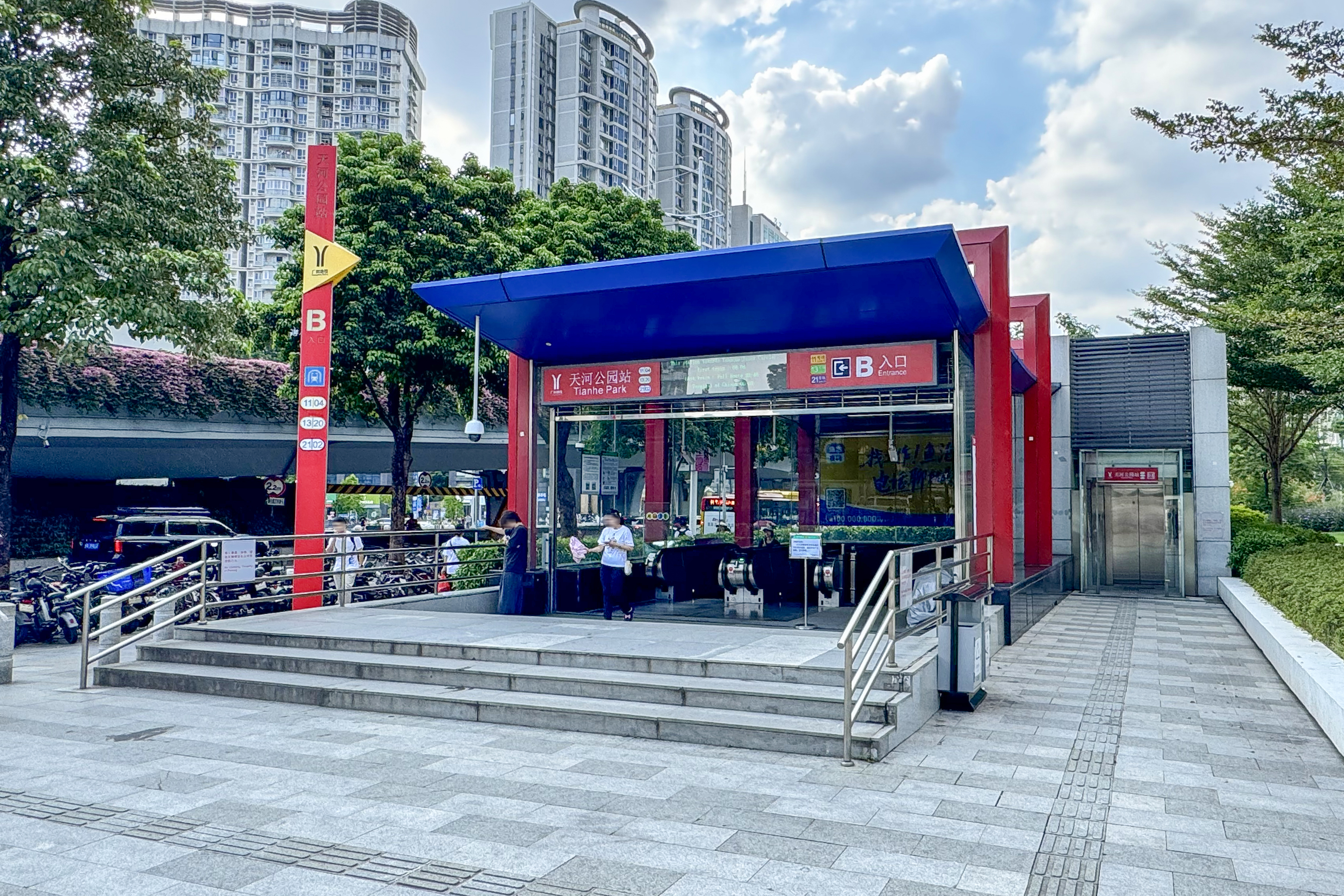
Entrance B

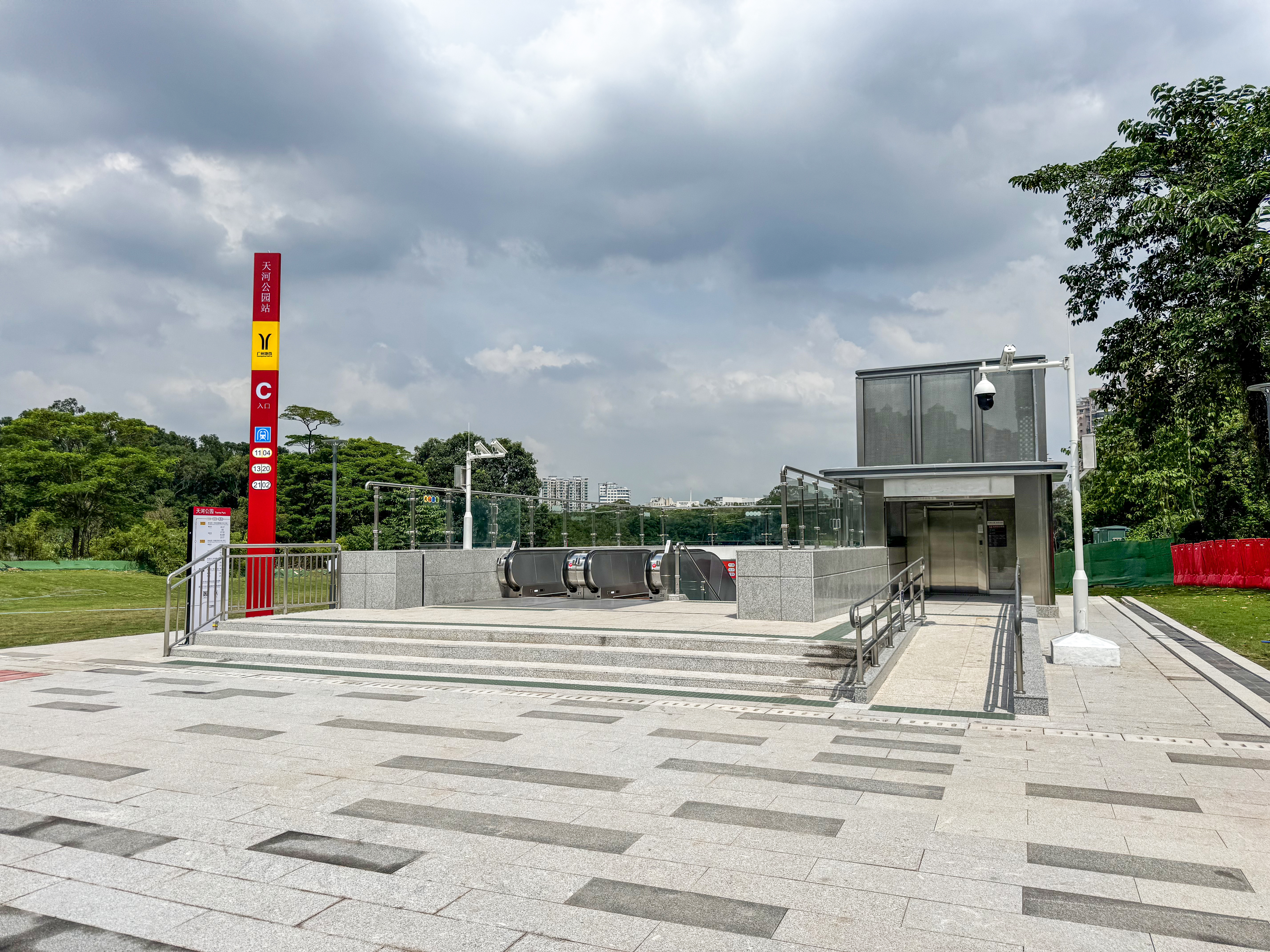
Entrance C

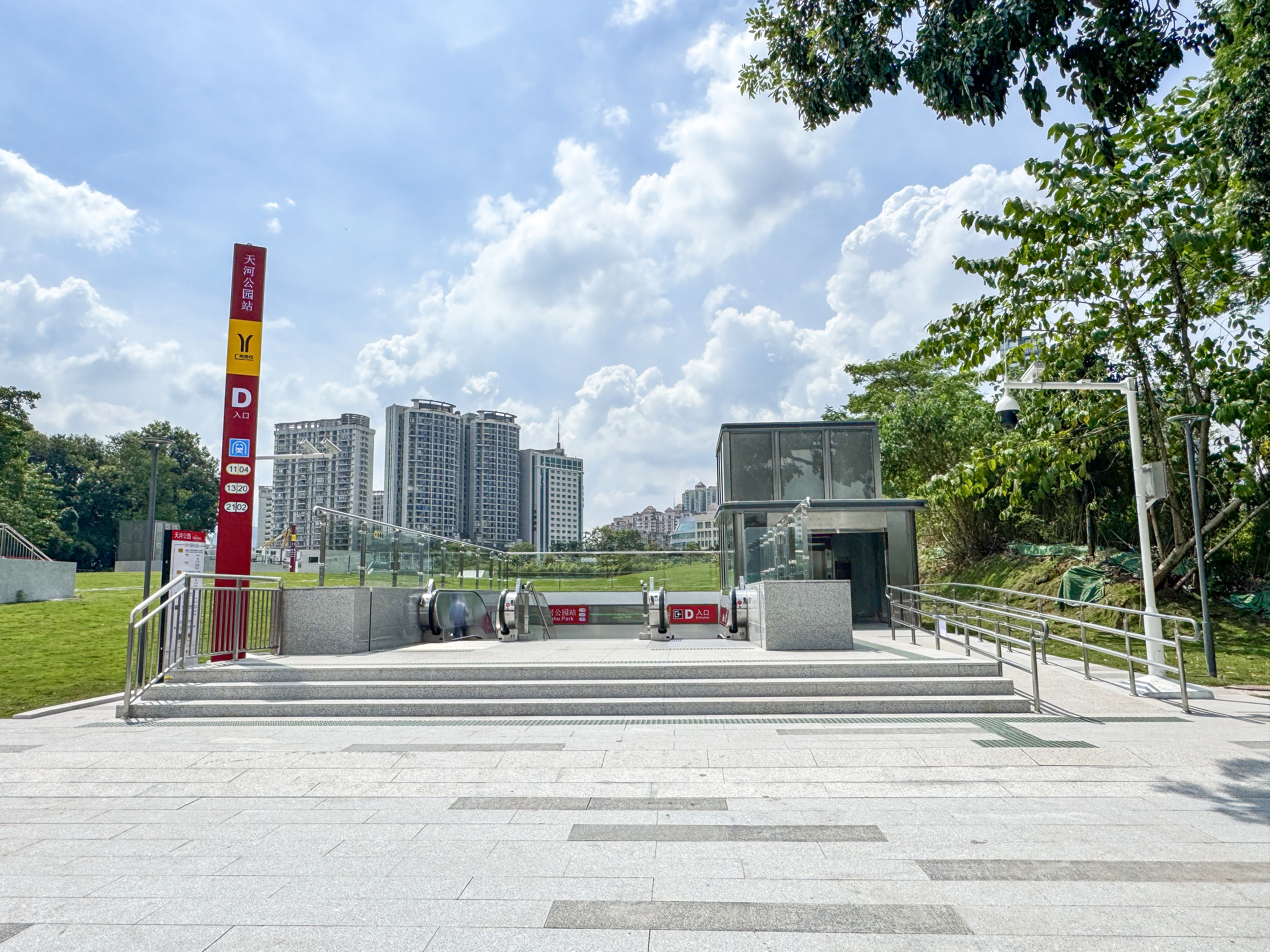
Entrance D

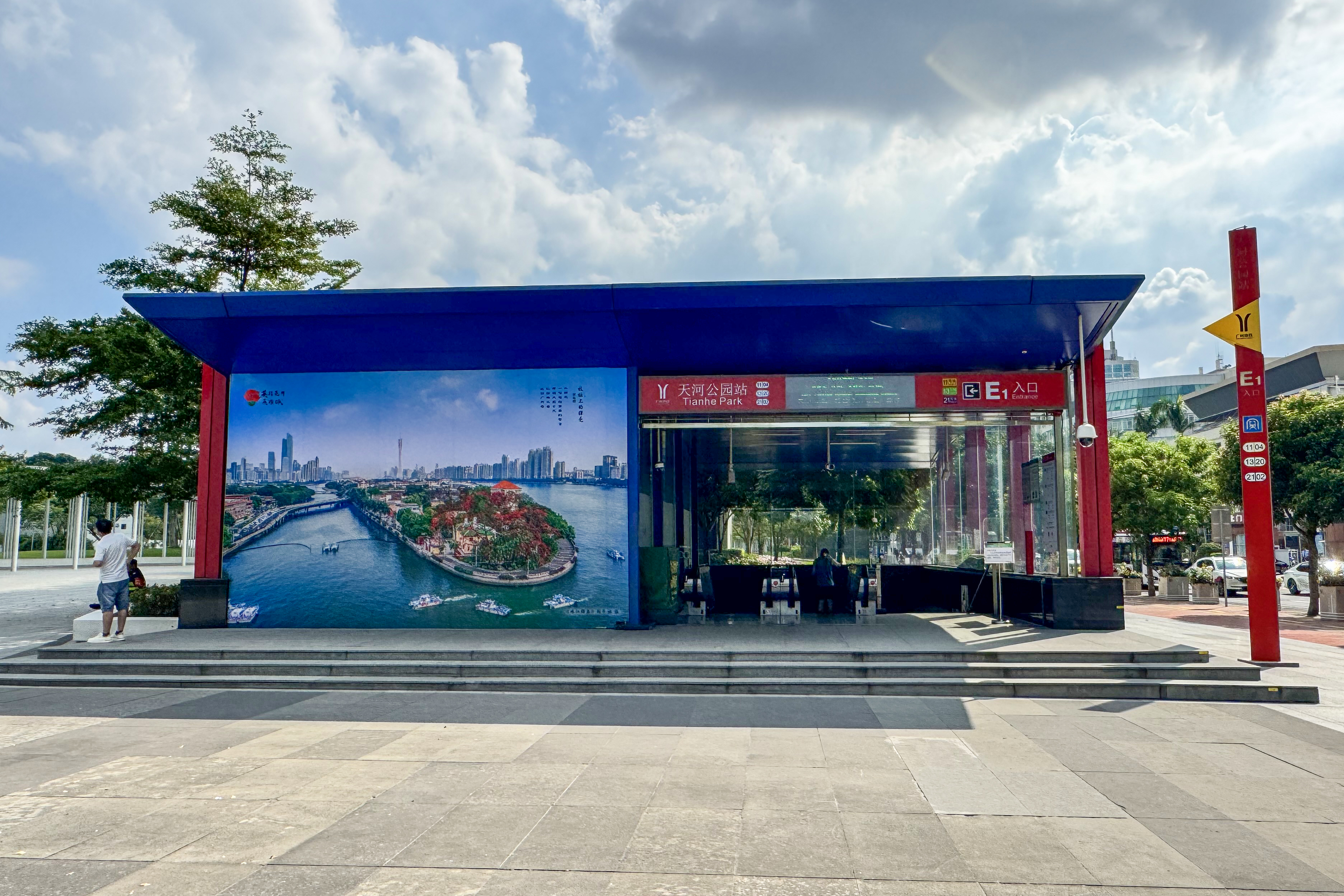
Entrance E1

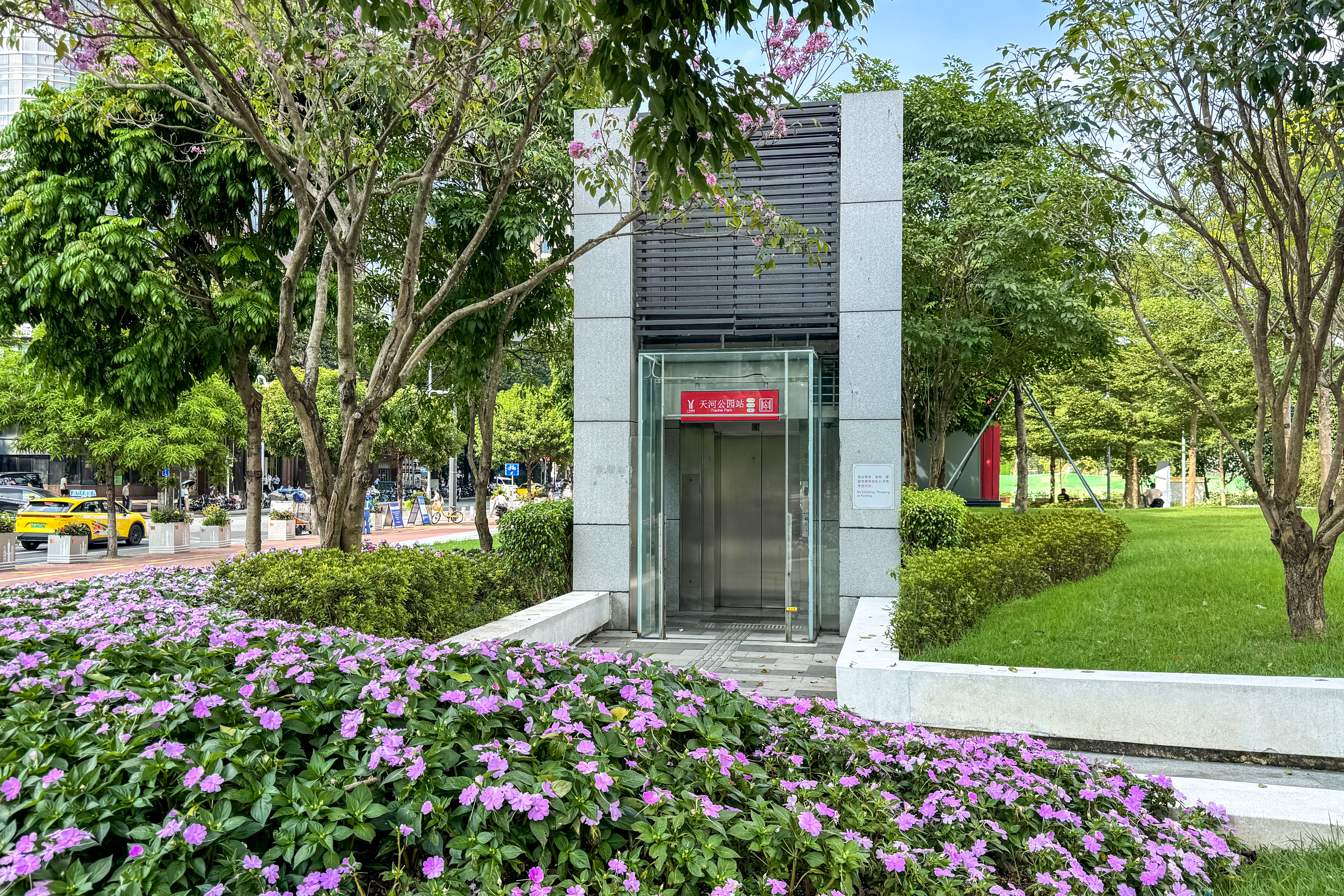
Elevator of Entrance E1

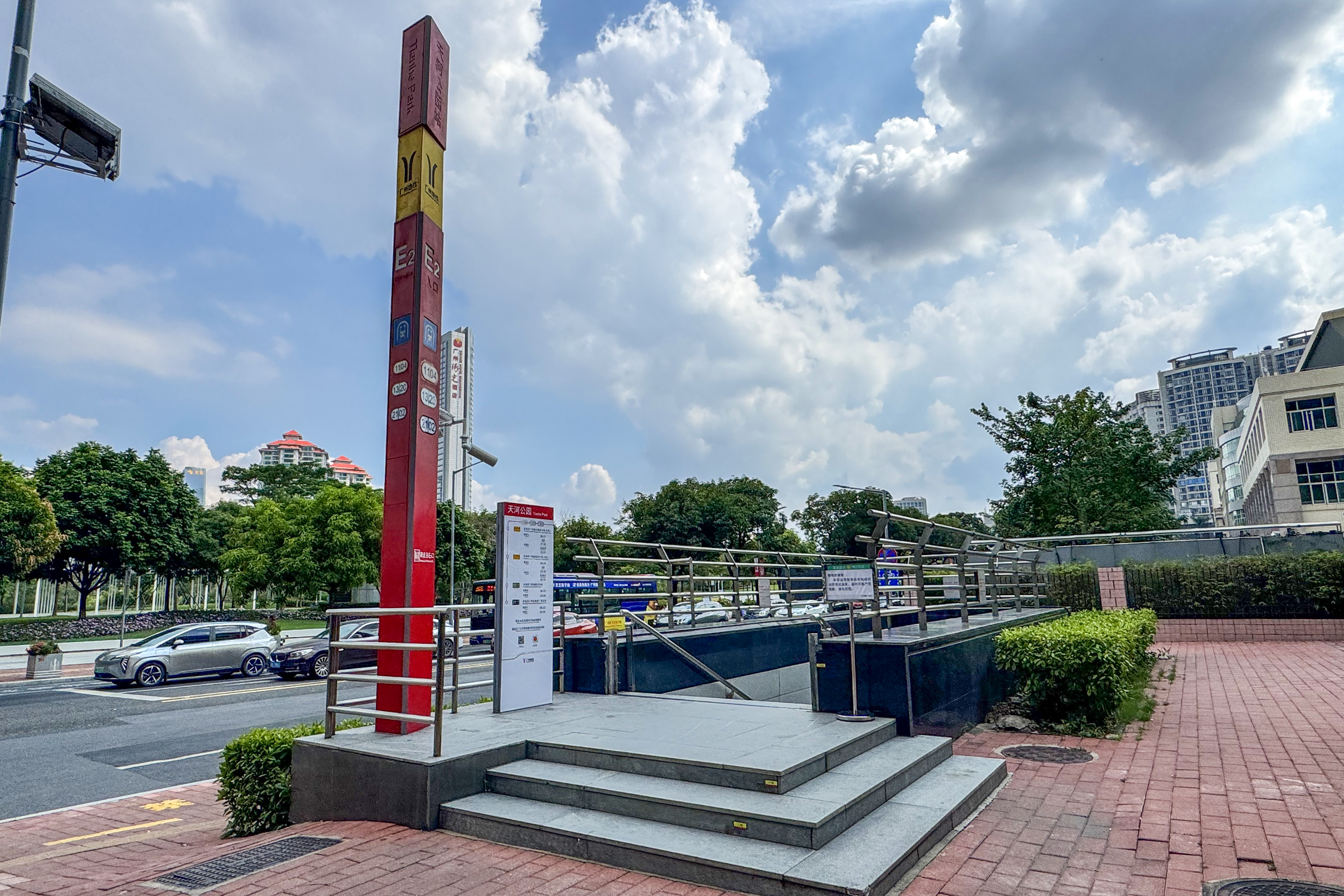
Entrance E2

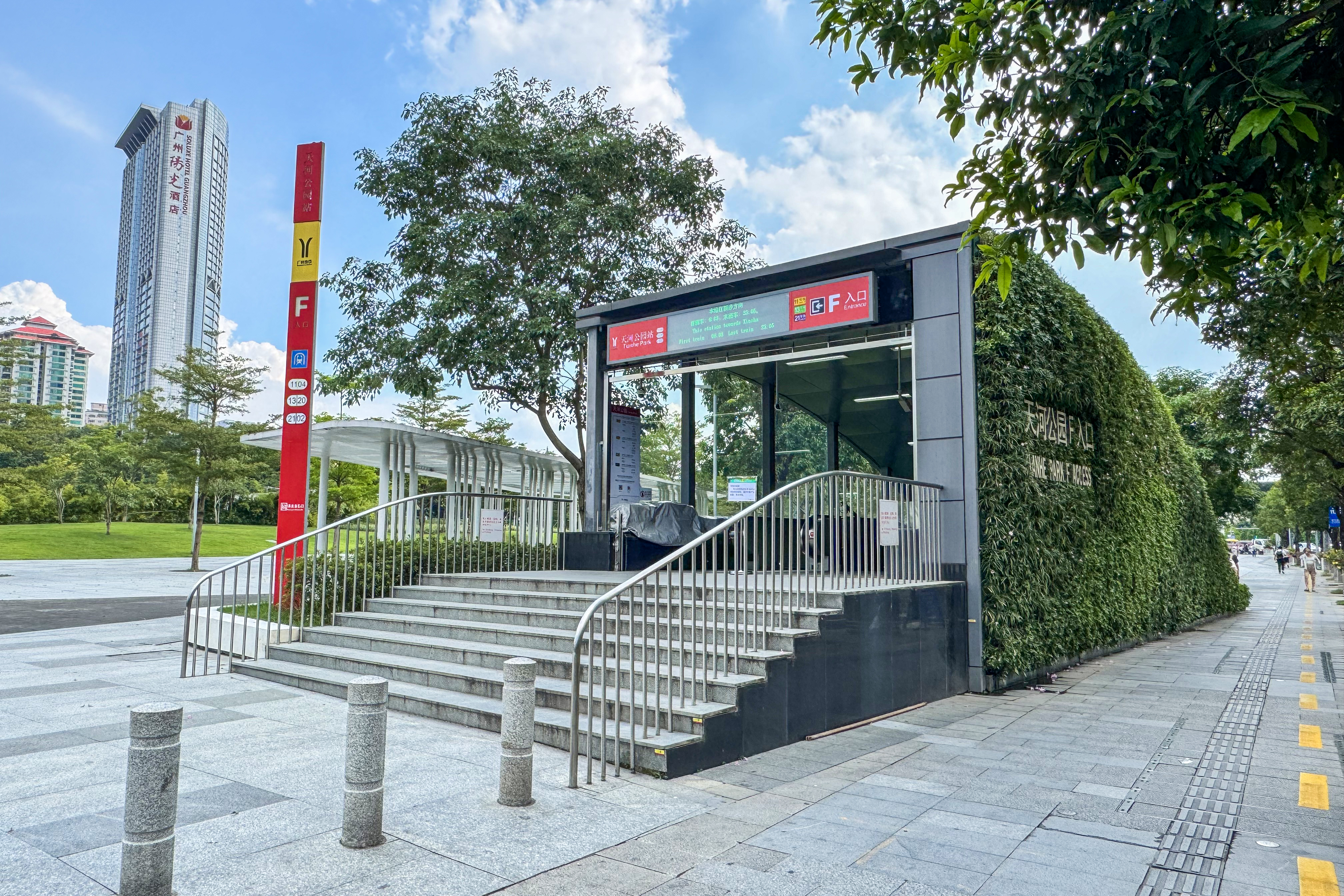
Entrance F

== Gallery ==
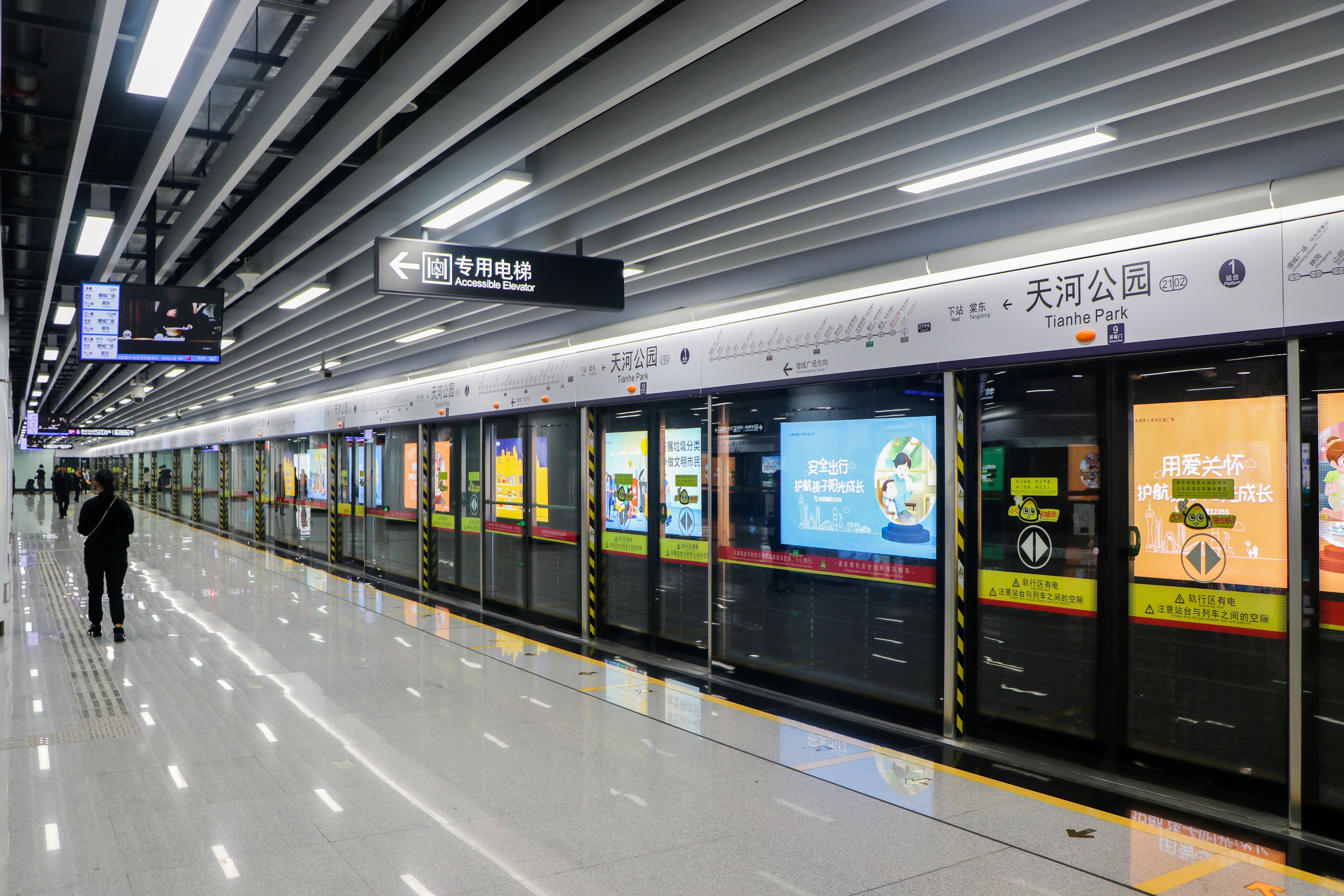
Platform 1 (prior to renovation)

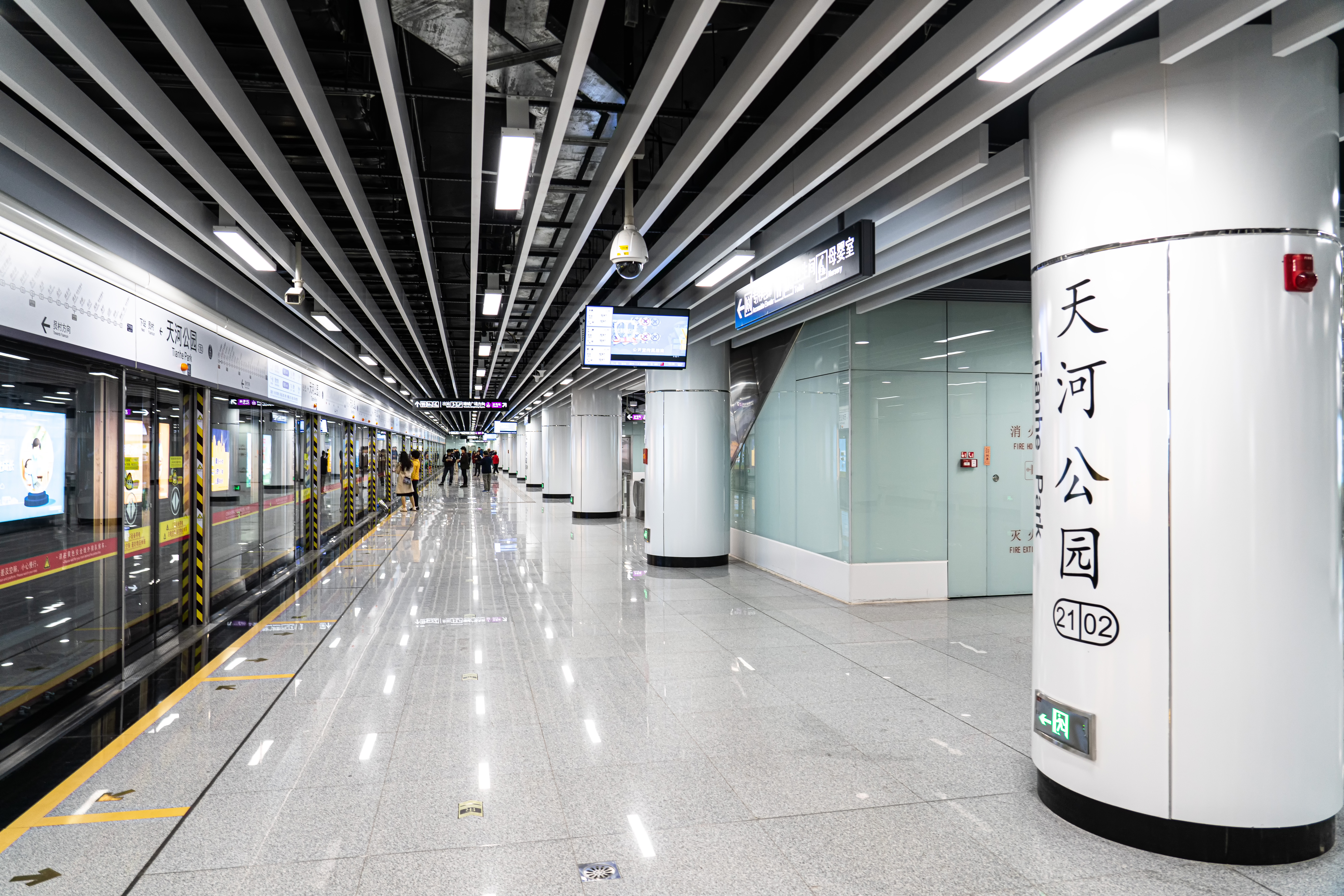
Platform 2 (prior to renovation)

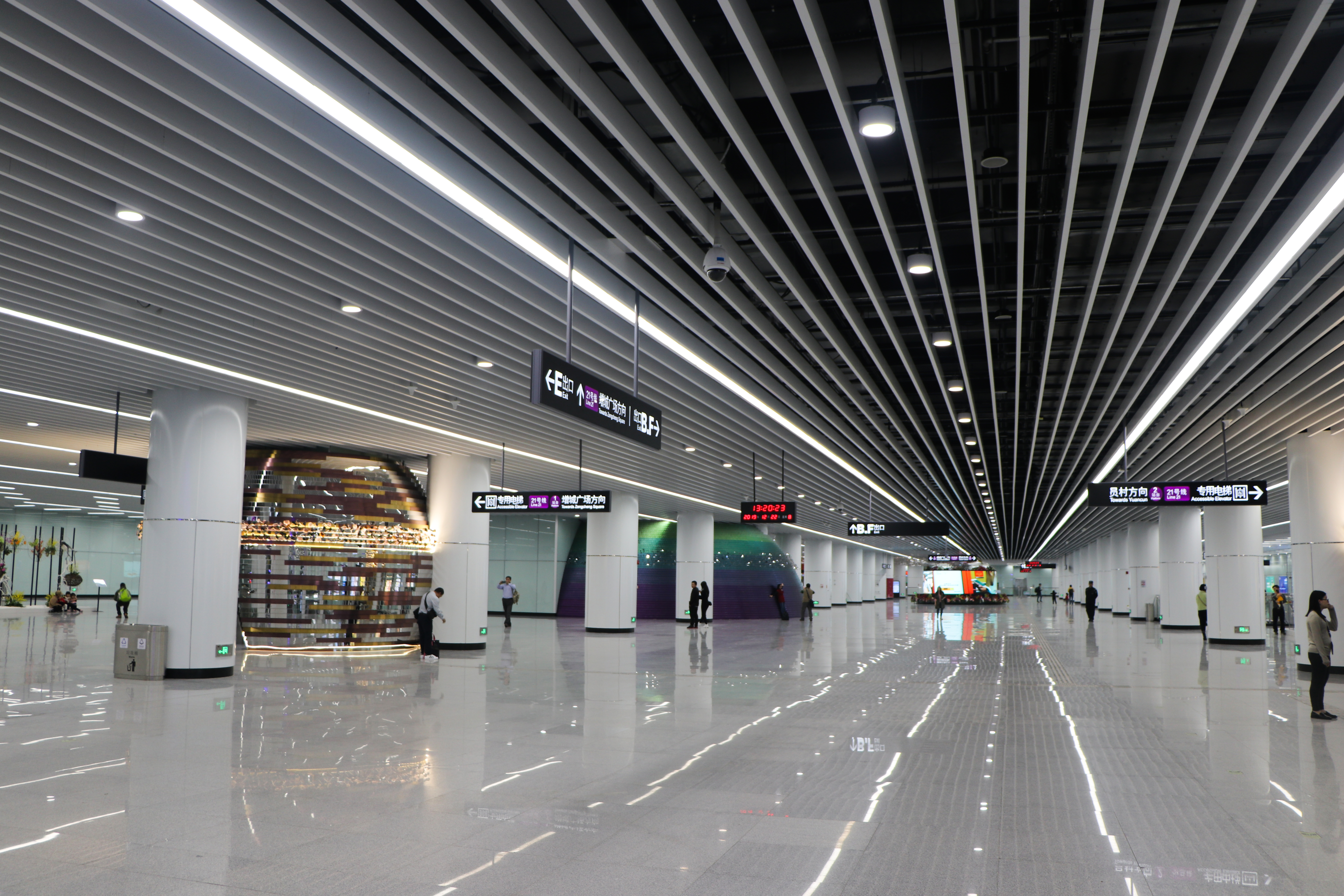
Concourse in 2019

== History ==
=== Planning ===
In the 2003 subway plan, Line 14 ran along Zhongshan Avenue and passed through an upper shrine near the northeast corner of Tianhe Park, along with a station. Later, in the 2008 proposal, the original Line 14 was split, and the station in Tianhe Park became the interchange station for the split and reorganized ring line (Line 8) and Line 13, and the location was also moved to the intersection of Huangpu Avenue on Tianfu Road, which is the southwest corner of the park. The station was also directly named Tianhe Park because of its proximity to Tianhe Park. Later, in the 2010 plan, the ring line was changed to a completely new construction project, and the code was adjusted to Line 11. The station became one of the interchange stops for Lines 11 and 13.

In 2011, Line 21, which was stripped from the northern extension of the original Line 4, was also extended from Huangcun Station to this station to interchange with Line 11 and Line 13. As a result, the station became a three-line hub.

In the further design of Line 21, it was considered that when Line 21 was opened, Lines 11 and 13 of this station had not yet been completed and opened, making Line 21 a "dead end" when it arrived at this station. Therefore, Line 21 temporarily borrowed the Line 11 section from this station to Yuancun, so that Line 21 can interchange with Line 5 and provide better access to the network. On the eve of the completion of Line 11, the section was dismantled from Line 21 and returned to Line 11 for operation.

=== Site selection and construction ===
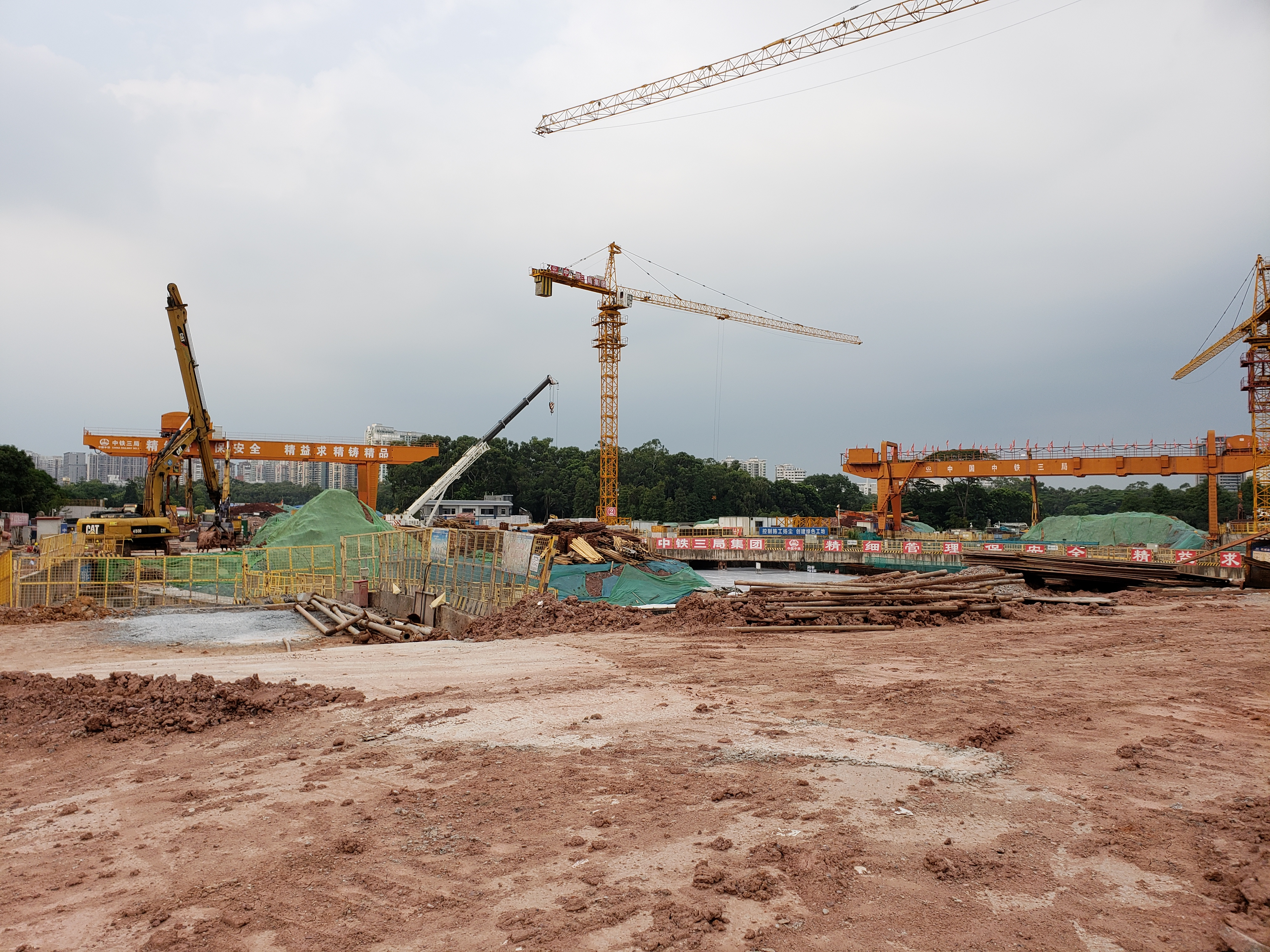
Line 21 construction site (August 2018)

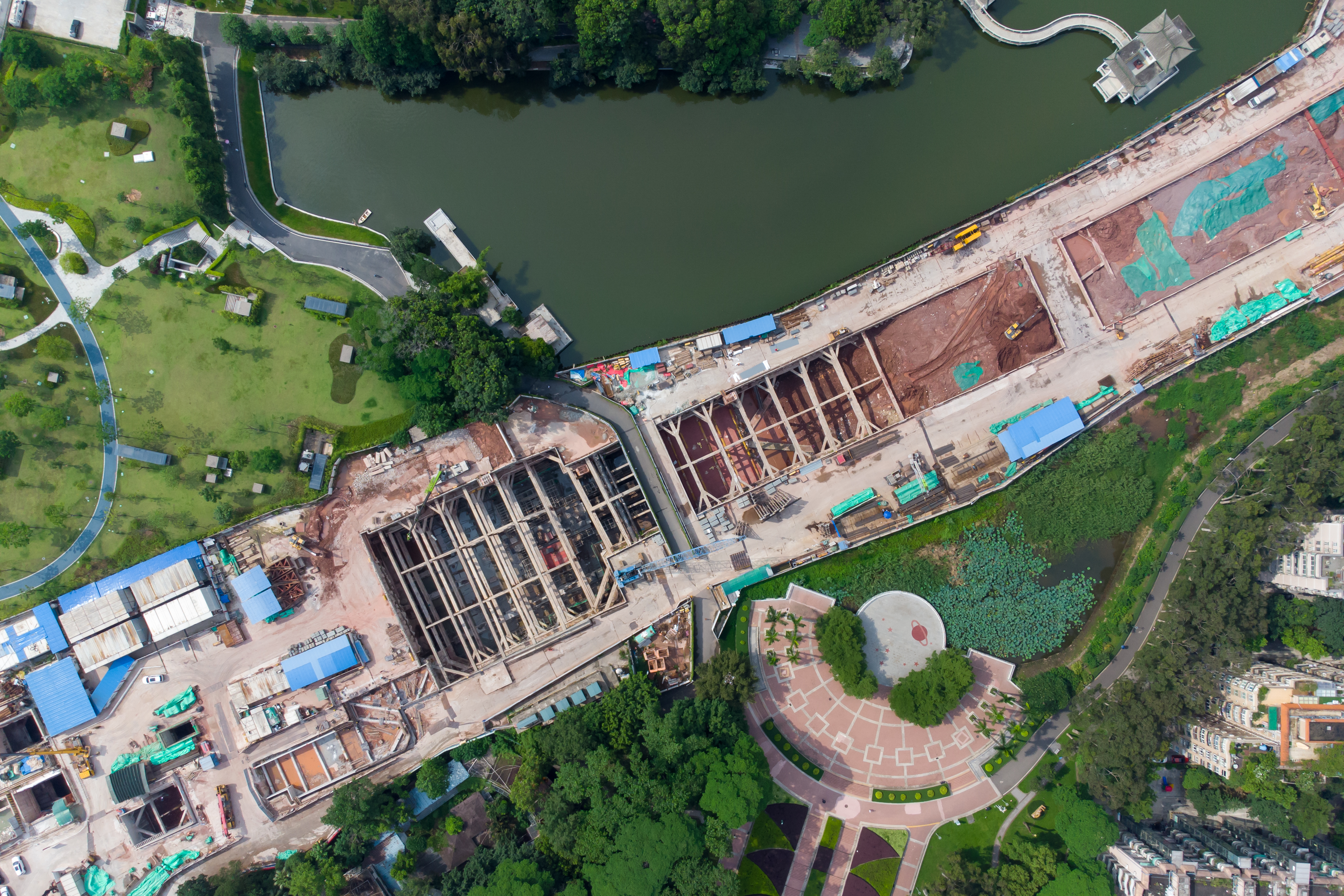
Line 13 construction site, occupied in the inner lake of Tianhe Park (July 2022)

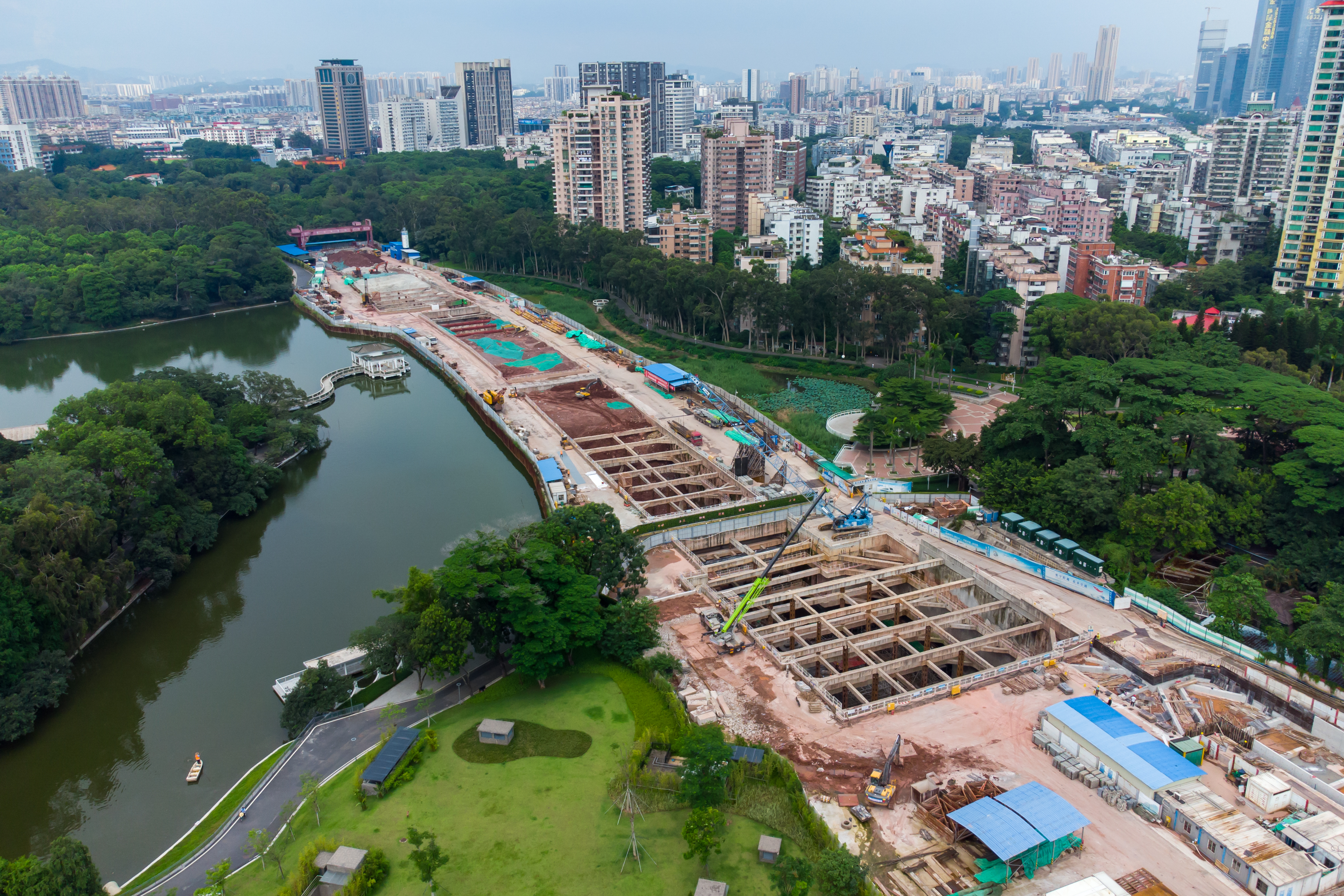
Line 13 station under construction (July 2022)

In the preliminary demonstration of the site selection of Tianhe Park Station, many schemes were abandoned by the metro company due to their great impact on traffic and citizens. The metro company had considered setting up the station on Tianfu Road, but in addition to occupying four lanes and two sidewalks, it also had to demolish the buildings with a total area of 200,000 square meters of Tianhe District Government, Nanyang Guansheng Hotel, Guangchang Building and Xinli Gas Station. If the station is set on Yuancun 2nd Cross Road on the south side of Huangpu Avenue, it will be necessary to completely occupy Yuancun 2nd Cross Road, and at the same time, it will be necessary to demolish many buildings such as Dongjing Garden, Yuancun New Estate, and Yuancun Workers' Cultural Palace. Although the above two plans will not affect Tianhe Park, they will have a serious impact on the surrounding roads, operations and people's daily life during the three-year construction period. Therefore, in order to minimize the impact on the surrounding area, the Tianhe Park station was finally set up within Tianhe Park, and the station site was chosen to be located in the southwest corner of the park with relatively small crowds. According to the final plan, a total of 80,454 square meters of land will be borrowed from Tianhe Park for metro construction, which will be mainly used for the construction of tunnel structures between Tianhe Park Station and Tangdong Station, as well as the equipment placement and processing sites required for construction. During the construction period, more than 4,000 large trees were dug up in Tianhe Park, and part of the landscape lake land in the park was also occupied. The metro company said it would restore the green space in the park after the construction was completed and would move back most of the trees.

==== Line 11 and Line 21 ====
On 31 July 2018, the main structure of the station was capped, making it the last capped station on Line 21. On 20 December 2019, the Line 11/21 station was put into use with the opening of the remaining section of Line 21. On 19 April 2021, Exit E2 opened.

As Line 21 part of this station was opened first, when the station initially opened, Line 21 stopped at platforms 1 and 2 on the outside, while platforms 3 and 4 on the inside were temporarily used as standby platforms. At the time of construction, the two outer platforms were built directly into a platform that could accommodate 8-car A-type trains (the model used by Line 11). Since Line 21 itself uses 6-car B-type trains, the platform screen door is installed according to the 6B-type train, and the extra length is directly closed with a glass plate false wall. The contact network required for Line 11 has also been installed in advance on the outer platform and the section from this station to Yuancun Station. On 27 September 2024, the false wall of glass panels on the outer platform began to enclose and prepare for demolition. At 23:00 on 1 October, the dismantling and renovation project officially began, and the original 6B-type screen doors of the two outer platforms will be dismantled, and the screen doors suitable for the 8A-type will be installed at the same time. The third track of the outer platform and related sections were dismantled, and the signaling system used by Line 11 was replaced at the same time. At the end of the same month, the station renovation project was completed and the "three rights" transfer was completed.

At the same time, the southern terminus of Line 21 was officially shortened to this station on 2 October after the start of the dismantling and reconstruction and instead began utilizing platforms 3 and 4 on the inner side of the station. On 28 December 2024, Line 11 opened, and thus the outer platforms 1 and 2 were returned to service.

==== Line 13 ====
On 26 December 2017, the Line 13 station and the switchback line behind the station broke ground, marking the official start of the second phase of Line 13. In March 2019, the second phase of enclosure construction began. In September 2020, the main structure of the station and the transfer passageway was topped out. In July 2025, the Line 13 section completed the "three rights" transfer. On 29 September 2025, the Line 13 station opened.

=== Station closure due to COVID-19 ===
During COVID-19 pandemic control rules at the end of 2022, due to the impact of prevention and control measures, station service was suspended from 26 to the afternoon of 30 November 2022.
