= Zhenlong station (Guangzhou Metro) =

Guangzhou Metro station

Zhenlong 镇龙
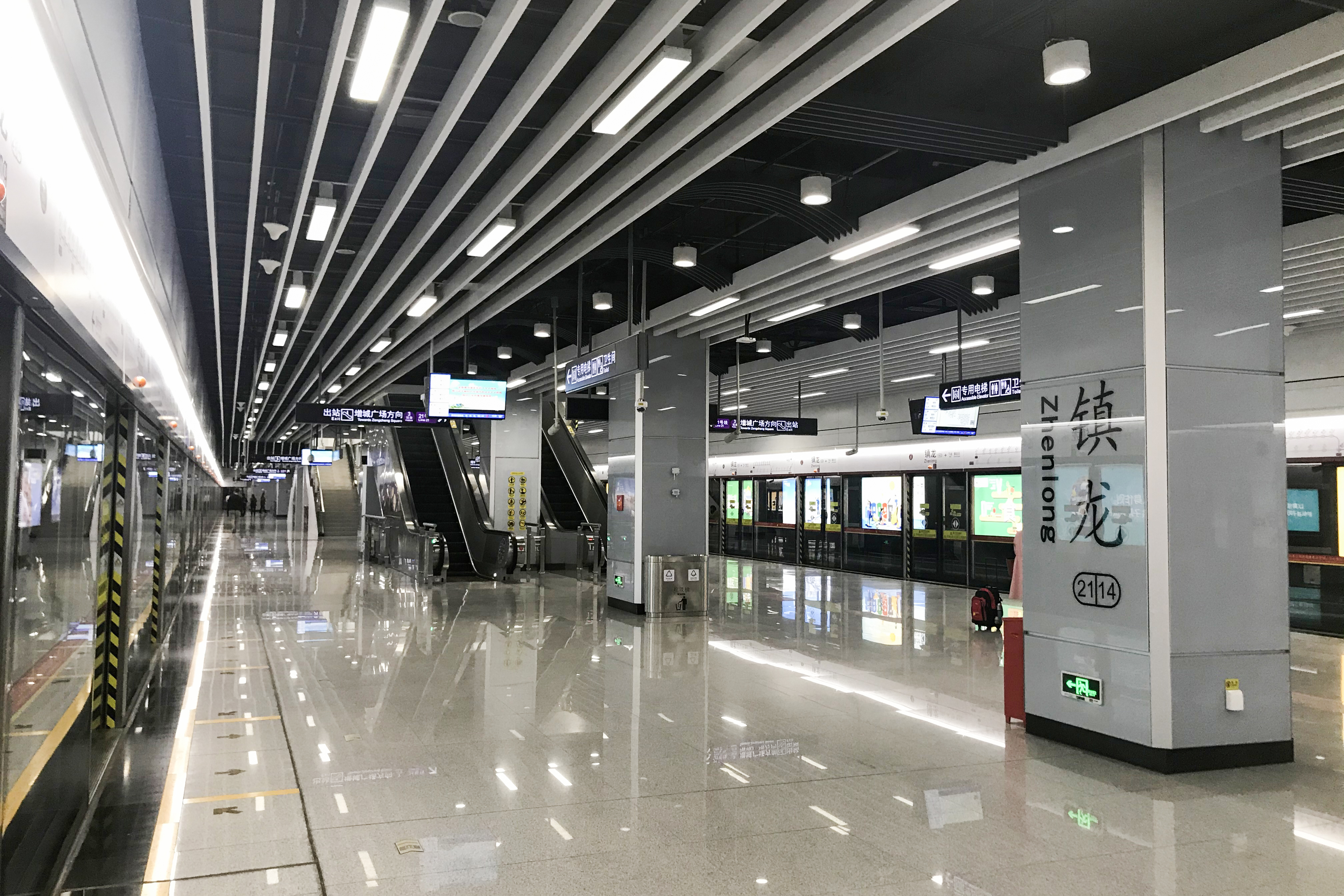
- Platforms 2 & 4 (Line 14 towards Xinhe, Line 21 towards Tianhe Park)

Chinese name
- Simplified Chinese: 镇龙站
- Traditional Chinese: 鎮龍站
Transcriptions
Standard Mandarin
- Hanyu Pinyin: Zhènlóng Zhàn
Yue: Cantonese
- Yale Romanization: Janlùng Jaahm
- Jyutping: Zan^{3}lung^{4} Zaam^{6}

General information
- Location: Guangshan Highway (G324) east of Jiulong Avenue (九龙大道); Xinlong, Huangpu District, Guangzhou, Guangdong; China
- Coordinates: 23°17′14.16″N 113°35′16.76″E
- Operator: Guangzhou Metro Co. Ltd.
- Lines: Line 14; Line 21
- Platforms: 4 (2 island platforms)
- Tracks: 4
- Connections: Zhenlong

Construction
- Structure type: Underground
- Accessible: Yes

Other information
- Station code: 1430 2114

History
- Opened: Line 14: 28 December 2017 (8 years ago); Line 21: 28 December 2018 (7 years ago)

Services
Preceding station	Guangzhou Metro	Following station
Zhenlongbei towards Xinhe	Line 14 Branch (Knowledge City Line)	Terminus
Zhenlongxi towards Tianhe Park	Line 21	Zhongxin towards Zengcheng Square
Shuixi towards Tianhe Park	Line 21 Express	Fenggang towards Zengcheng Square
Location

Zhenlong station (Chinese: 镇龙站; pinyin: Zhènlóng Zhàn) is an interchange station between Line 14 and Line 21 of the Guangzhou Metro. The station started operations as part of the Knowledge City Line of Line 14 on 28 December 2017 and the Line 21 platforms started operation on 28 December 2018. The station also serves as the southeastern terminus of the Knowledge City branch of Line 14. The station connects to the Suishen intercity railway.

== Station layout ==
The station has four floors, with a building area of 27,000 square meters. The foundation pit is approximately 367 meters long and 45 meters wide. The station is located near the Guangshan Highway, Zhenlong Depot, Zhenlong railway station of the intercity railway and other buildings. The first three floors above ground are reserved for future development. The second floor is a transition level connecting the at-grade concourse to the intercity railway station and the property above the Zhenlong Depot (Xinghuicheng TOD). The ground floor is the concourse, and the first basement level is the platform level.

F3; Reserved Zone	-	Reserved
F2	Transfer Mezzanine	Towards Xinghui City TOD (Exit H), Zhenlong railway station (Exit J)
G Concourse	Lobby	Ticket Machines, Customer Service, Police Station, Security Checks; Station Equipment
B1; Platforms	Staff Passageway	Passageway between Station and Zhenlong Depot (not for passenger use)
B1; Platforms	Platform 4	21 towards Tianhe Park (Zhenlongxi / express: Shuixi)
B1; Platforms	Island platform, doors will open on the left (line 21) or right (line 14)
B1; Platforms	Platform 2	14 towards Xinhe (Zhenlongbei)
B1; Platforms	Platform 1	14 reserved platform
B1; Platforms	Island platform, doors will open on the left (line 21) or right (line 14)
B1; Platforms	Platform 3	21 towards Zengcheng Square (Zhongxin / express: Fenggang)

=== Concourse ===
The concourse is located on the ground floor and includes ticket vending machines and a passenger service center. A dedicated paid area provides four escalators, staircases, and an elevator to access platforms in different directions. A staff access corridor is located in the middle of the staircases connecting platforms 2 and 4, spanning platform 4 and the tracks, allowing station staff direct access between the station and Zhenlong Depot. Due to the station's relatively remote location, no businesses have yet opened shops within the station.

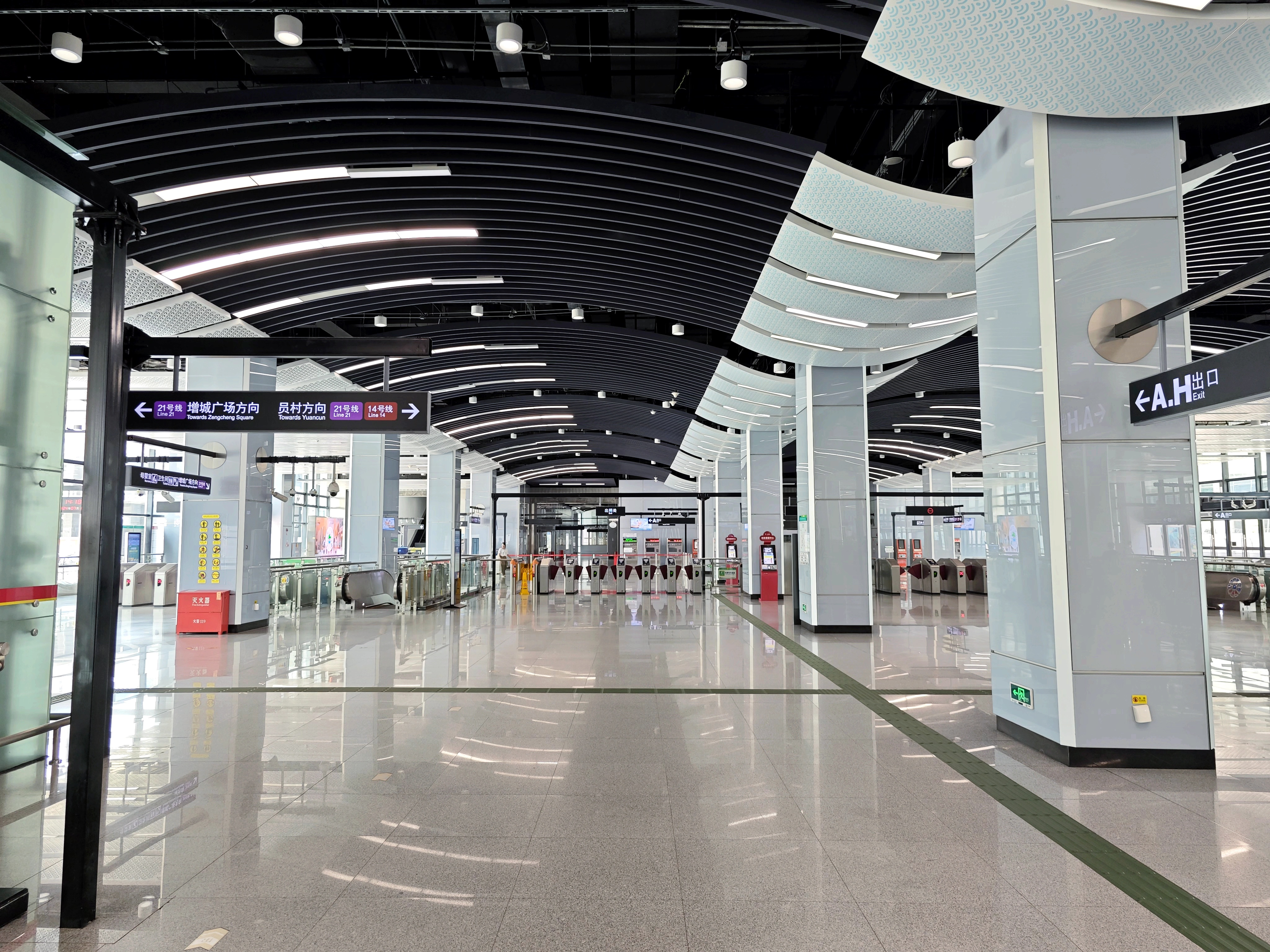
Concourse (surface level)

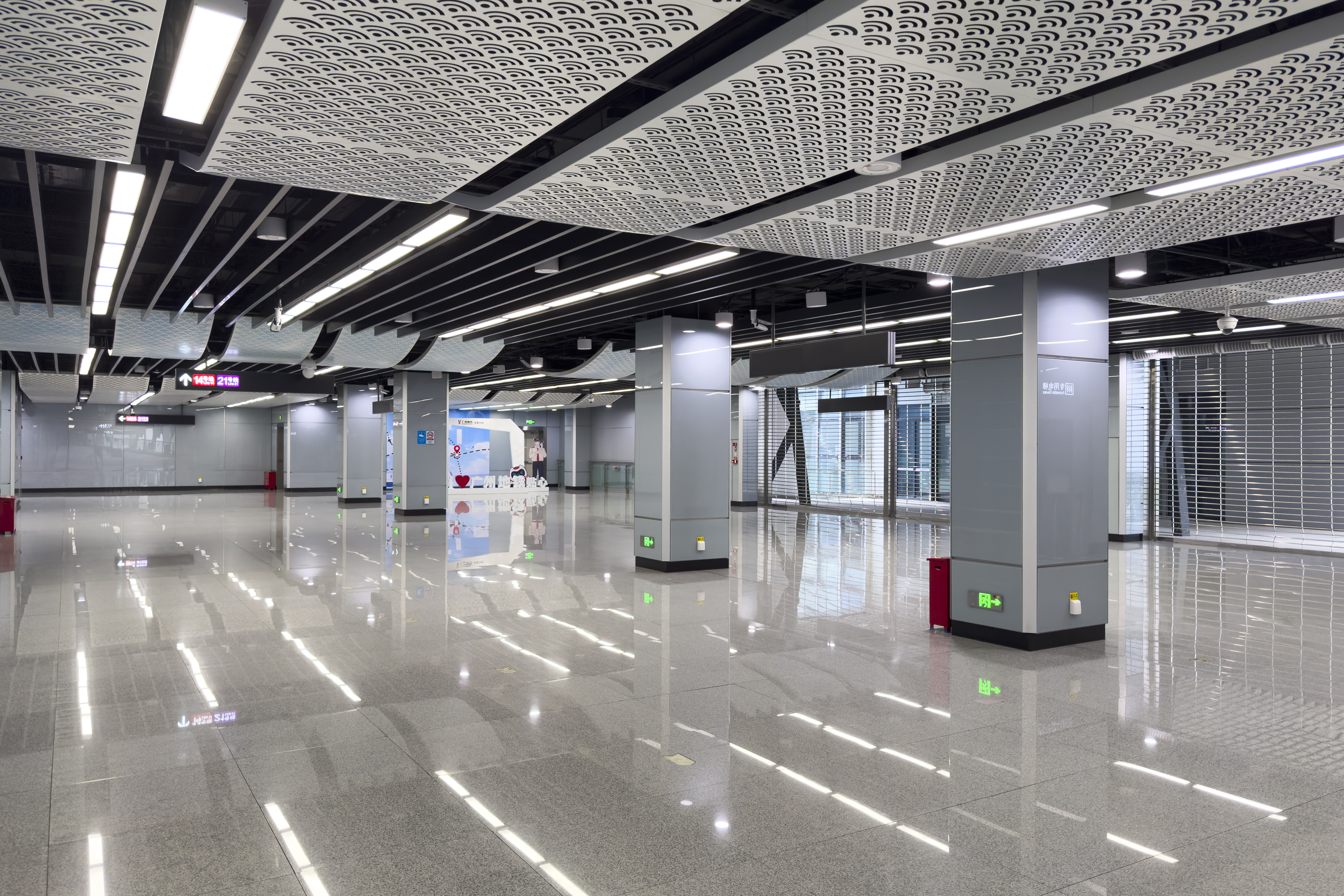
Transfer mezzanine (second floor)

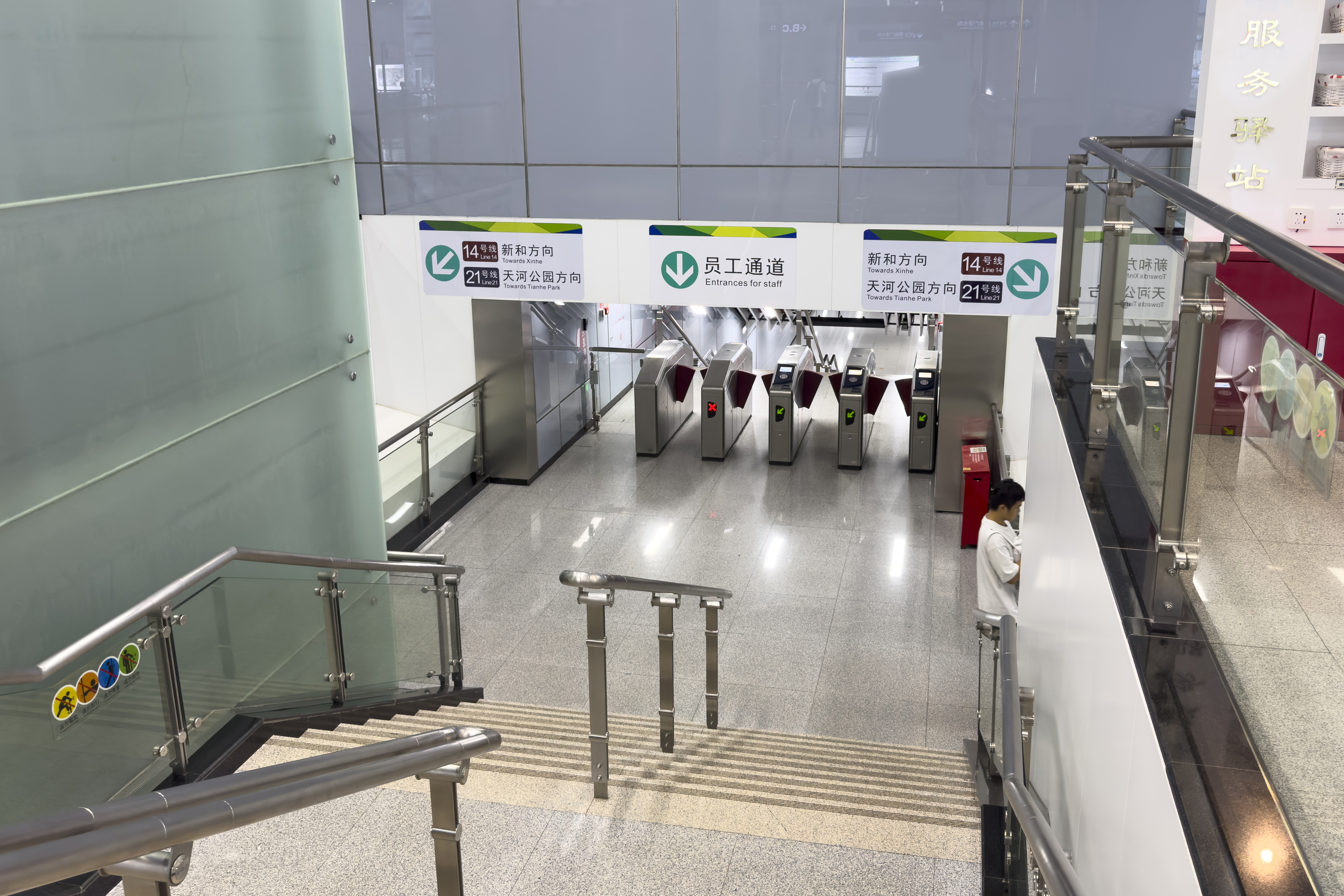
The staircases connecting platforms 2 and 4 in the concourse have a staff passage leading to Zhenlong Depot

=== Platforms and transfer ===
The station has two island platforms side-by-side, shared by Line 14 Branch and Line 21. Line 21 uses the outer platforms 3 and 4, while Line 14 uses the inner platforms 1 and 2. The inner Line 14 platform has a single crossover on its west side for pre-station turnback and a set of crossover tracks on its east side for post-station turnback. Two single crossover tracks connect Lines 14 and 21 on the east side, allowing through service between the two lines. However, no through service has ever actually been operated between the two lines. Toilets and nursery rooms are located at the east end of both platforms.

The station is a cross-platform transfer station, allowing passengers to directly transfer to another train to their destination (e.g. transferring from Line 21 towards Tianhe Park to Line 14 towards Xinhe), or to transfer via the concourse (e.g., transferring from Line 21 towards Zengcheng Square to Line 14 towards Xinhe). To facilitate Line 14 passengers traveling to the city center, since 17 January 2023, the operator has changed Line 14 trains to directly enter Platform 2 via a pre-station turnback, allowing direct transfers on the same platform to Line 21 towards Tianhe Park. After the morning and evening rush hours and just before the last train closes at night, some Line 14 trains will be taken out of service after passengers are cleared from Platform 2 and will return to Zhenlong Depot or Shihu Stabling Yard. An announcement will be made on Platform 2 at that time to remind passengers not to board.

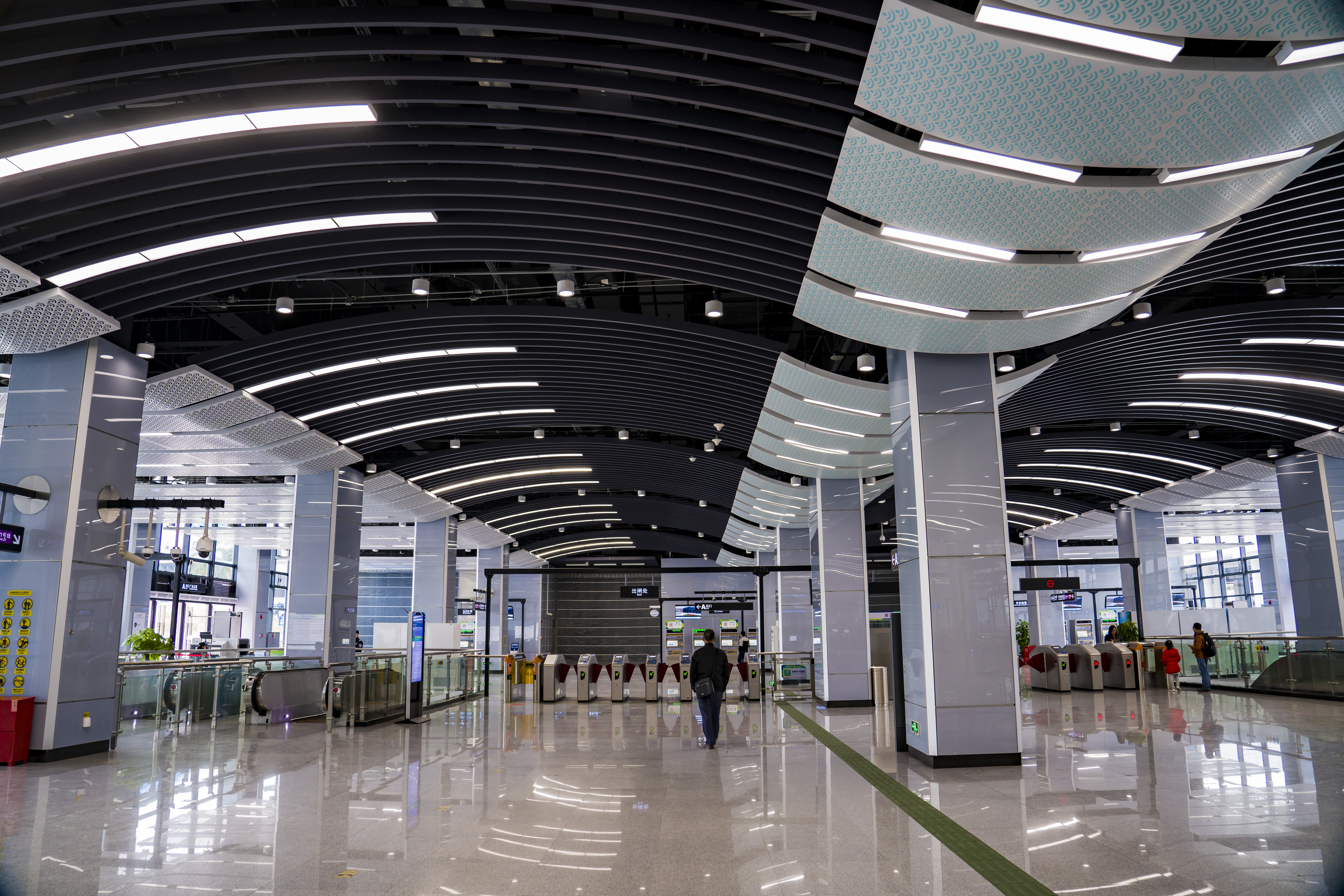
Concourse

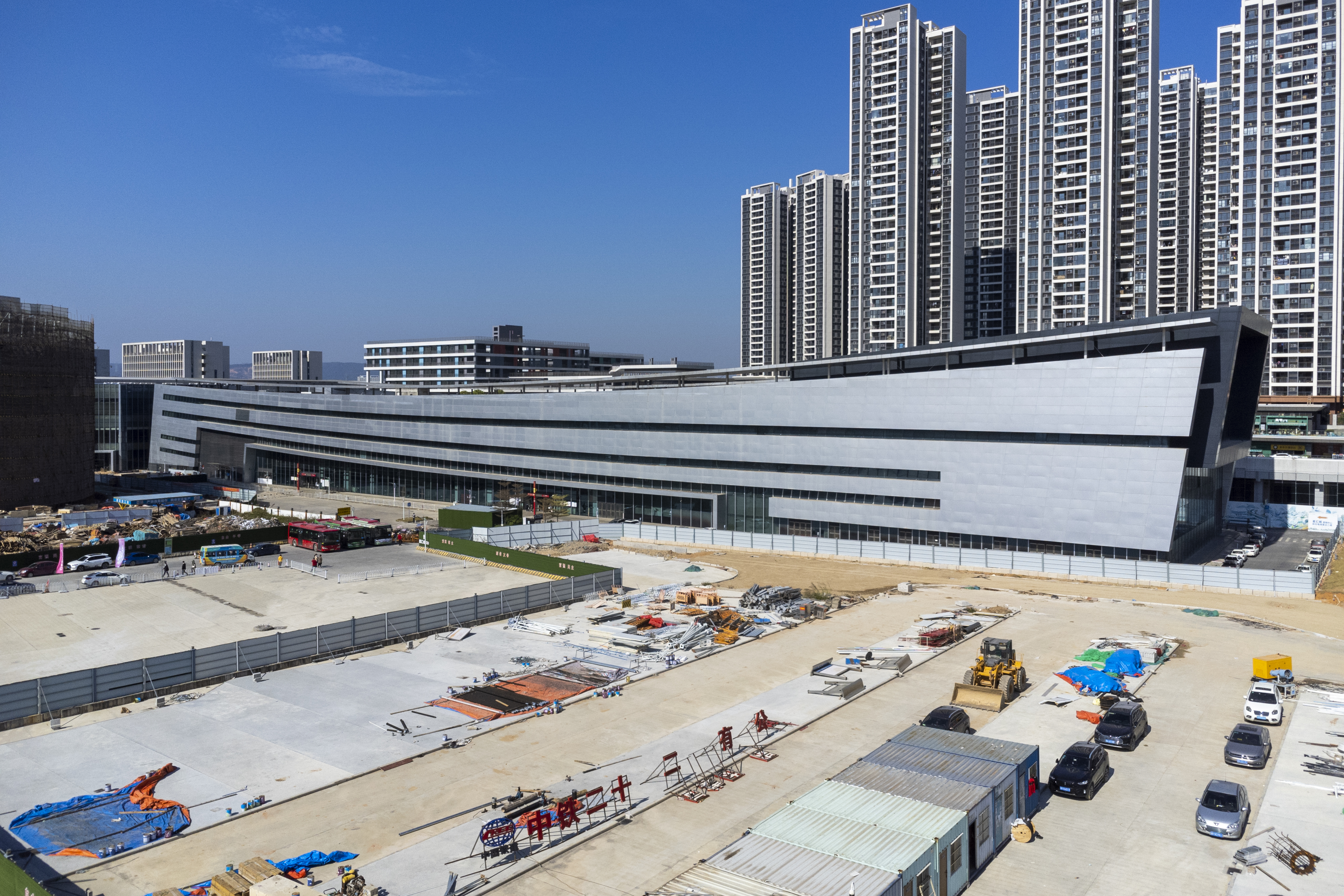
Exterior

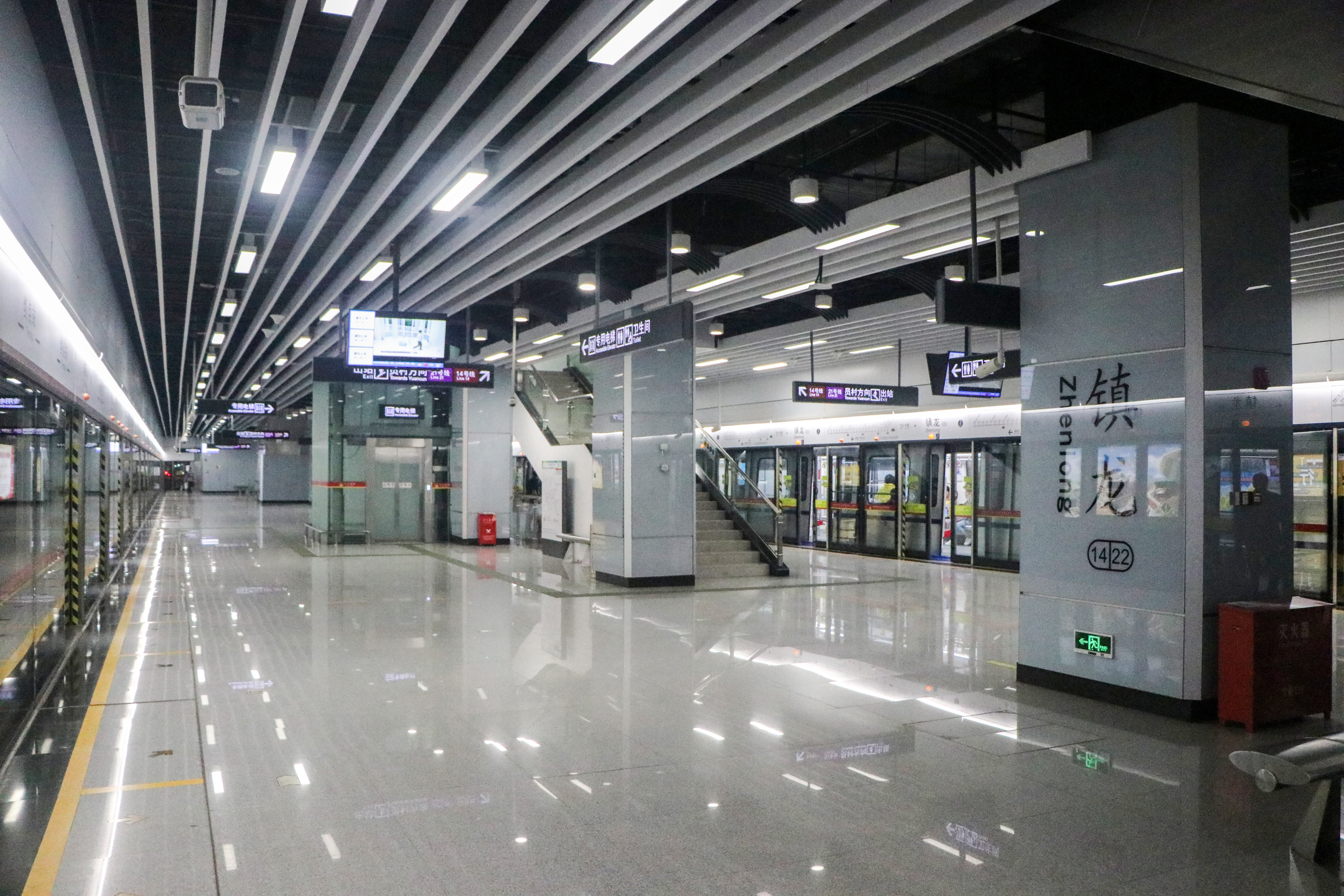
Platforms 1 & 3 (Line 14 termination platform, Line 21 towards Zengcheng Square)

=== Entrances/exits ===
The station has 6 points of entry/exit, Exits A-C opened when the station first opened, whilst Exit H on the transfer mezzanine opened on 5 January 2024. Exit G and Exit J opened simultaneously with the intercity station on 31 July 2026. All exits are equipped with ramps or elevators.

- A: Guangshan Highway (G324)
- B: Guangshan Highway (G324), Fengcai Street, Guangzhou Second Nursing Home, Zhenlong Metro Station Bus Terminus
- C: Guangshan Highway (G324)
- G: Guangshan Highway (G324)
- H: Xinghui City TOD
- J: Zhenlong railway station
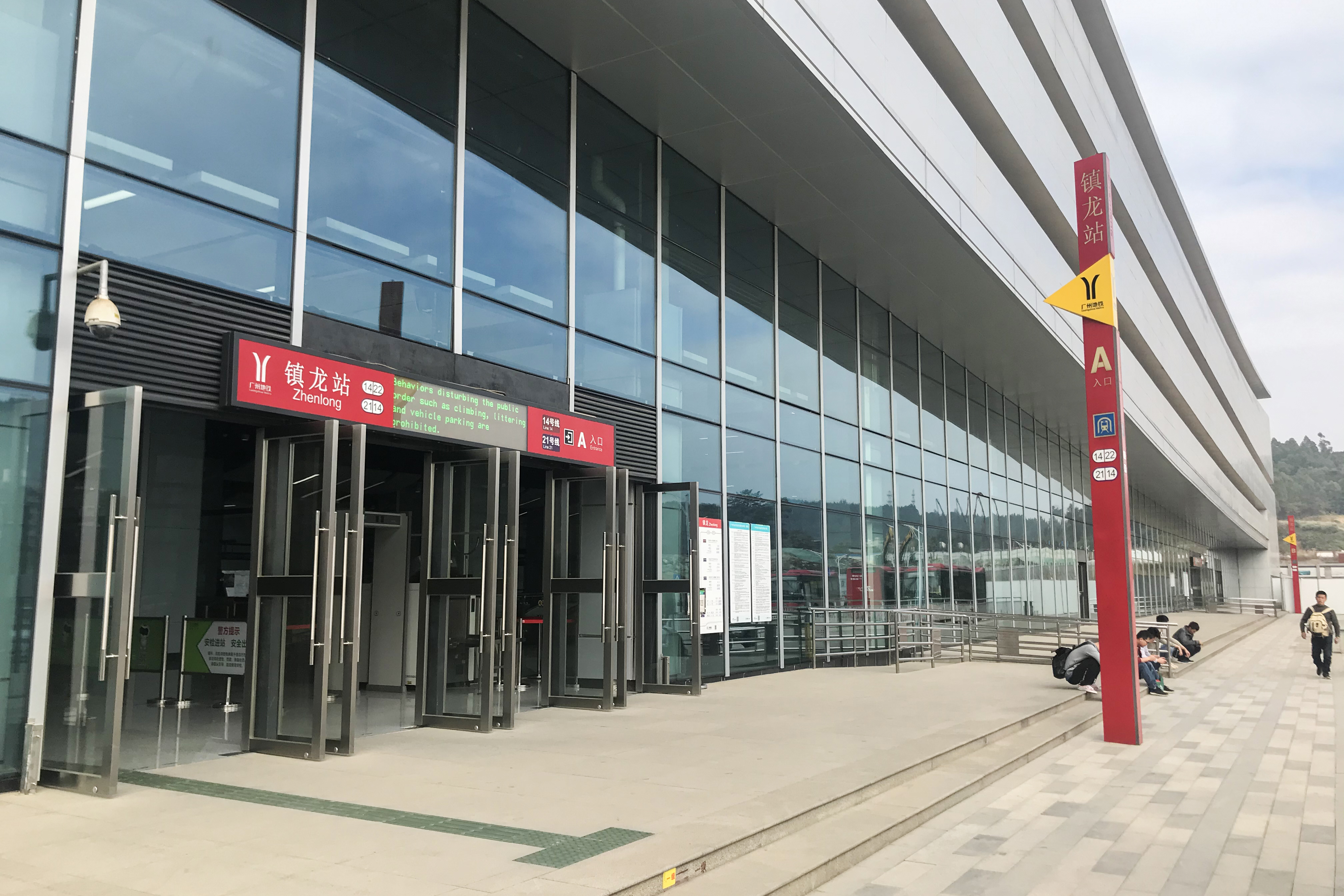
Entrance A

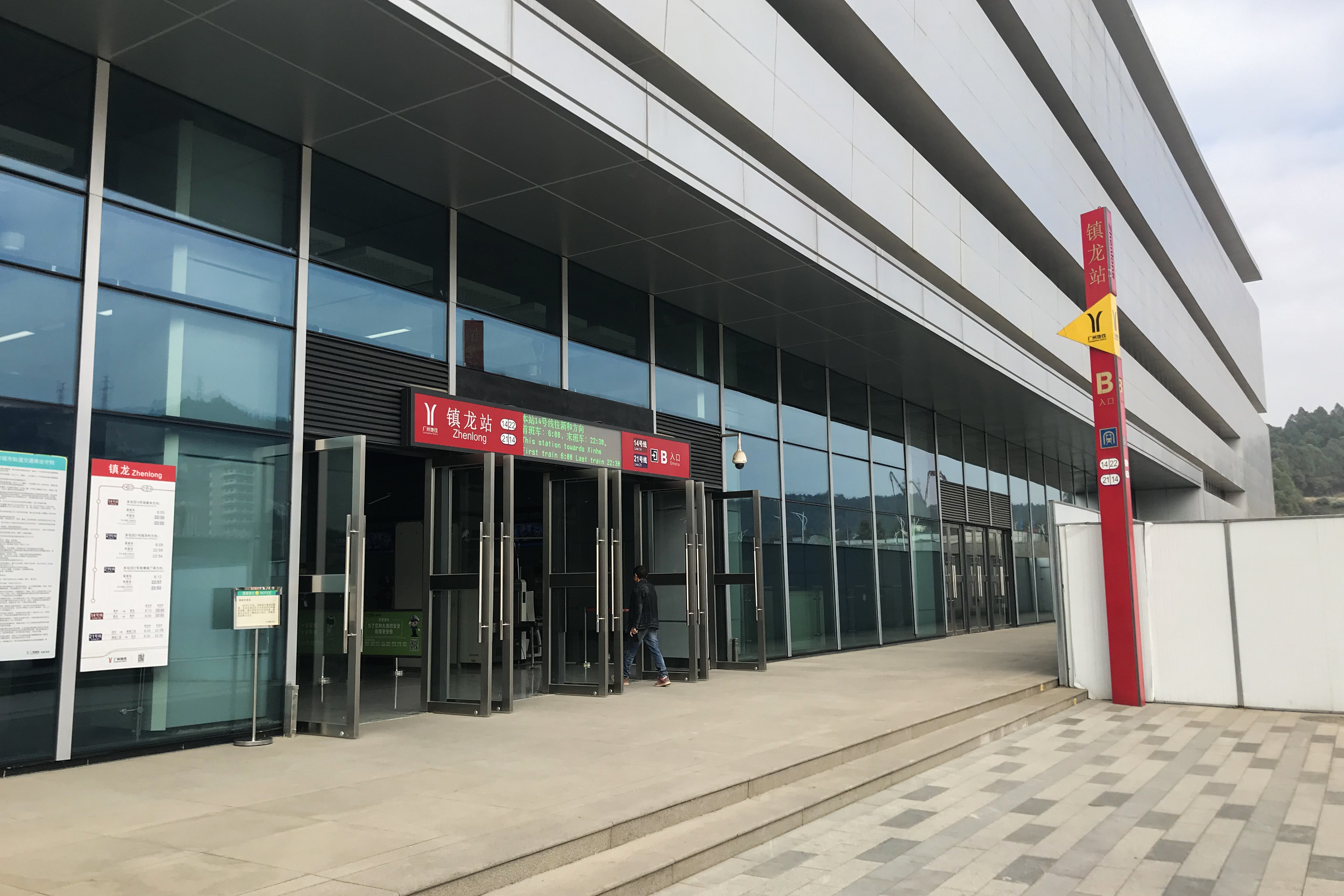
Entrance B

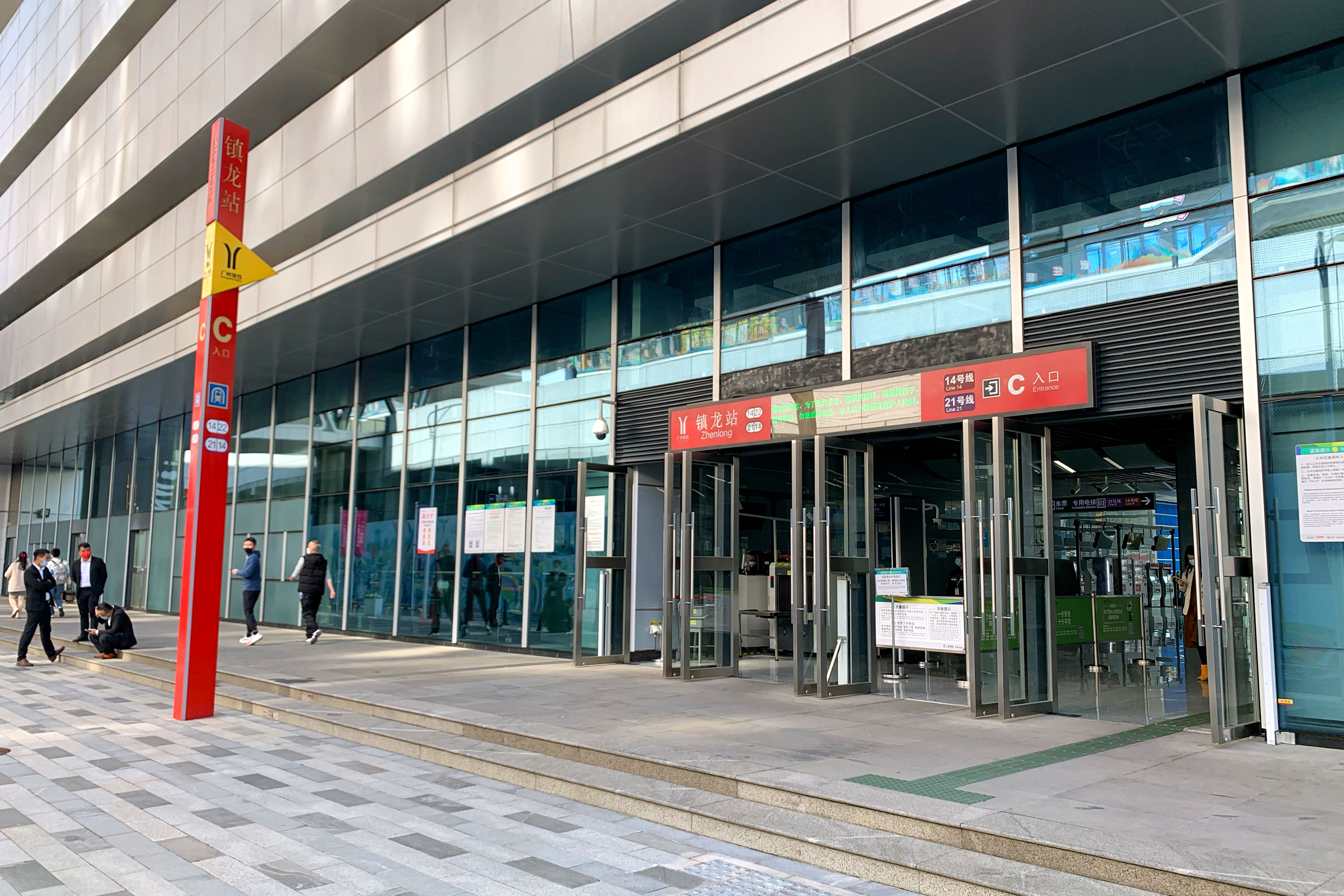
Entrance C

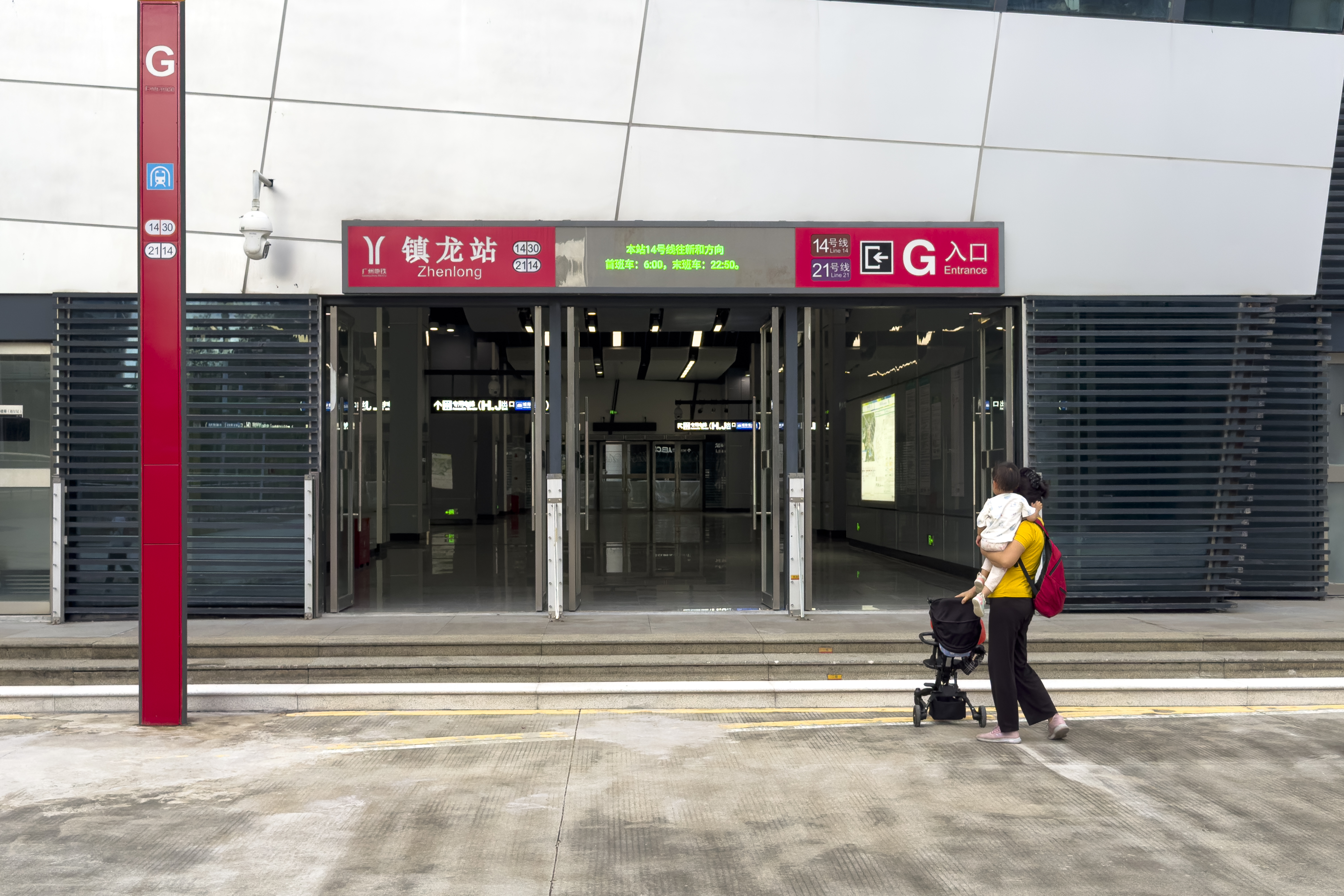
Entrance G

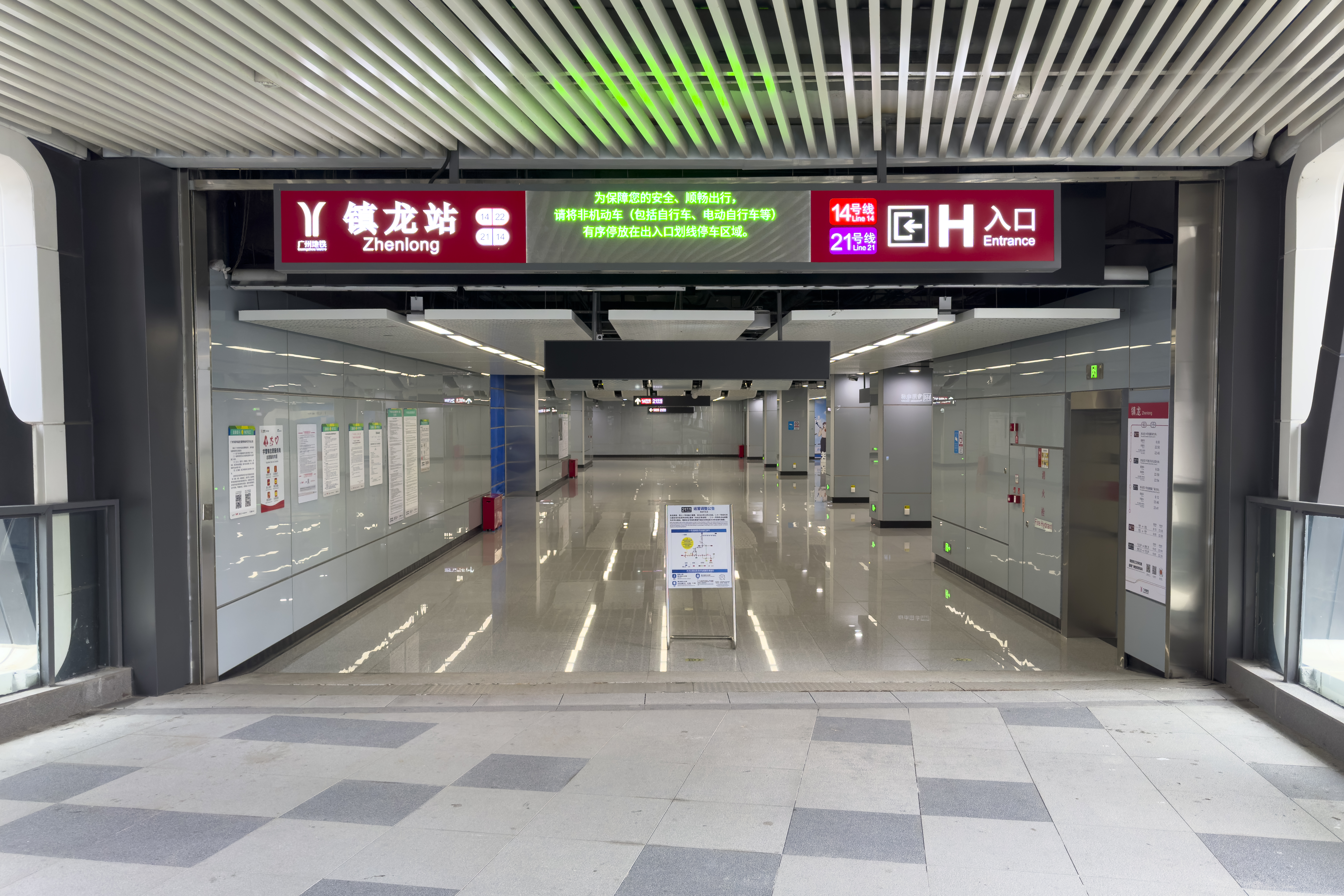
Entrance H

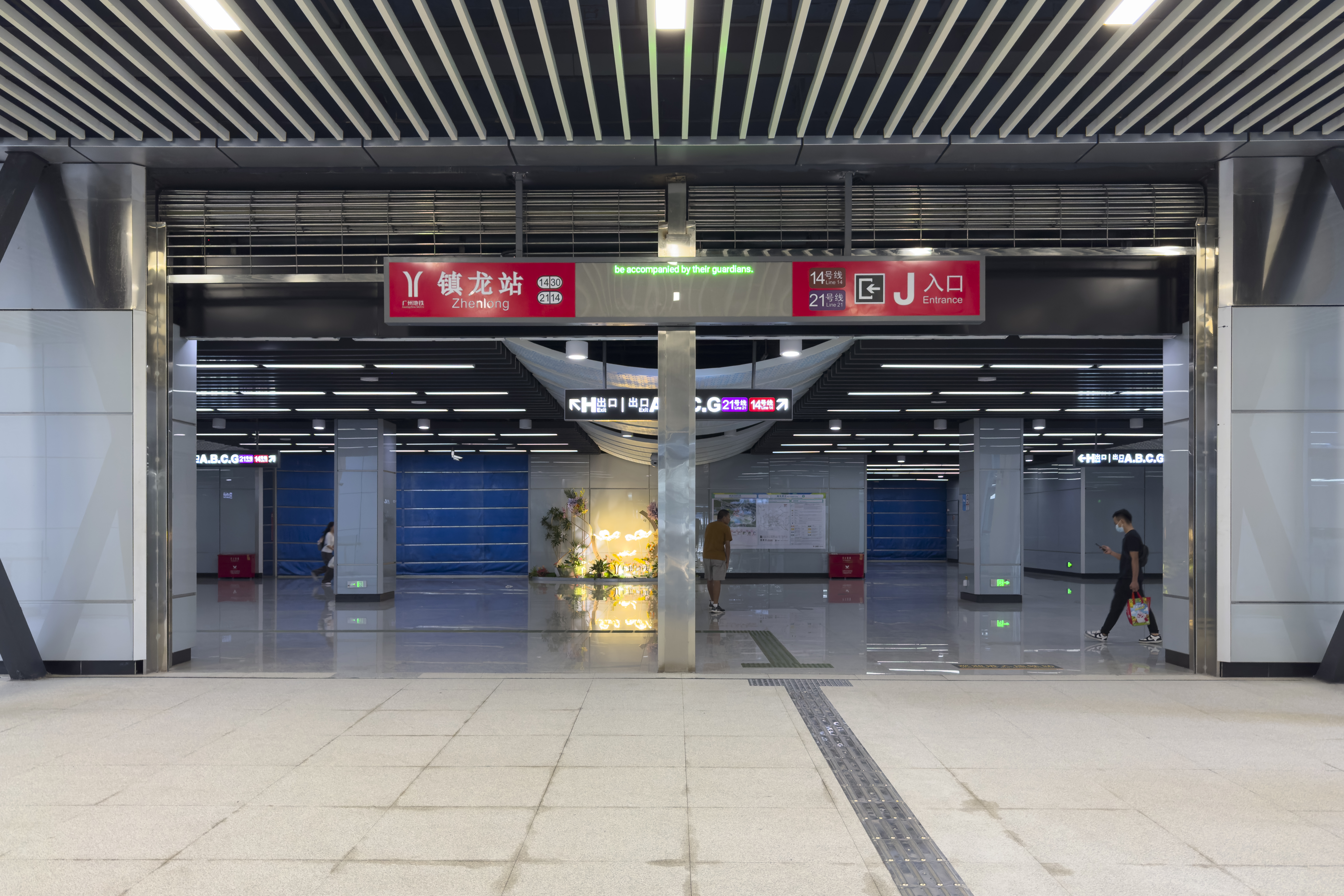
Entrance J (to intercity railway station)

== History ==
At the end of 2010, the planned northern extension of Line 4 (Huangcun-Shuixi) was separated and extended significantly eastward to Licheng in Zengcheng District, forming Line 21, with Zhenlong Station confirmed. Subsequently, the planned Knowledge City branch of Line 14 was also extended southward to this station, enabling transfers between the two lines. In 2012, with the approval of the Guangzhou Urban Rail Transit Construction Plan (2012-2018), construction of this station was implemented. The site was officially excavated in March 2014. The main structure of the first basement floor topped out on 23 January 2016, and the main structure of the ground level was topped out on 10 May 2017. The "three rights" transfer was completed on 3 December the same year.

On 28 December 2017, with the opening of the Knowledge City branch of Line 14, the station officially opened. The platforms for Line 21 were put into use a year later.

In October 2018, the Guangzhou Municipal Transportation Commission and Guangzhou Metro Group conducted an emergency evacuation drill for a train derailment between Tangcun and this station of the Line 14 Knowledge City Branch. The rehearsal lasted from 7 pm on 11 October until the end of the day's operations, while the formal drill took place from 6 pm on 31 October to noon the following day. The station was closed to the public during the drill.

On 3 January 2024, the electromechanical decoration project of the reserved transfer passage on the second floor was completed and the "three rights" transfer was completed. On 5 January, the second-floor transfer mezzanine concourse and Entrance/exit H were officially opened.

The station was initially numbered 1422 when the Knowledge City branch line first opened but was changed to 1430 when Phase II of Line 14 opened.

The northern extension of the Guangzhou-Shenzhen intercity railway includes Zhenlong railway station, where passengers can transfer within the station via Exit J of the metro station. The area where this station is located will be developed into a comprehensive transportation hub where intercity railways, metro lines, and highways converge. Furthermore, as residents gradually move into the properties above the depot, passenger flow at this station is expected to increase.
