= Yongning South railway station =

Guangdong Intercity railway station in Guangzhou, China

Yongningnan 永宁南
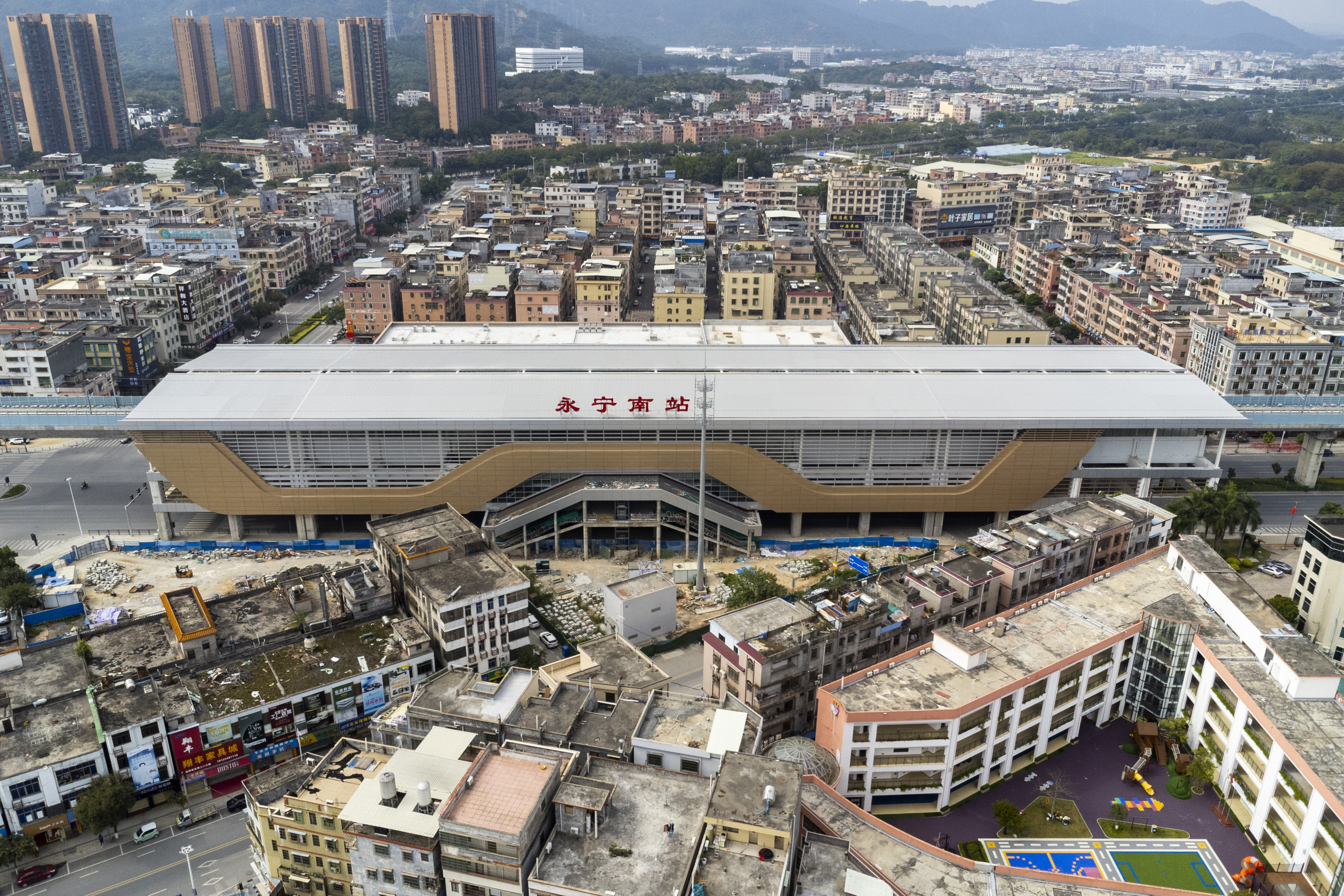
- Exterior (January 2023)

Chinese name
- Simplified Chinese: 永宁南站
- Traditional Chinese: 永寧南站
Transcriptions
Standard Mandarin
- Hanyu Pinyin: Yǒngníng Nán Zhàn
Yue: Cantonese
- Yale Romanization: Wíhngnìhng Nàahm Jaahm
- Jyutping: wing5 ning4 naam4 zaam6

General information
- Location: Xinxin Avenue Middle (新新大道中); Yongning Subdistrict, Zengcheng District, Guangzhou, Guangdong; China
- Coordinates: 23°10′58.62″N 113°35′7.19″E
- Owner: Pearl River Delta Metropolitan Region intercity railway
- Operator: Guangdong Intercity
- Line: Guangzhou–Shenzhen intercity railway
- Platforms: 2 (2 side platforms)
- Tracks: 2

Construction
- Structure type: Elevated
- Accessible: Yes

Other information
- Station code: YGA (Pinyin: YNN)

History
- Opened: 31 July 2026 (3 months ago)

Services
Preceding station	Pearl River Delta Metropolitan Region Intercity Railway	Following station
Yongning North towards Zhuliao	Guangzhou–Shenzhen intercity railway	Xintang South towards Shenzhen Airport
Location

Yongning South railway station (Chinese: 永宁南站; pinyin: Yǒngníng Nán Zhàn; Cantonese Yale: Wíhngnìhng Nàahm Jaahm) is a railway station on Suishen intercity railway located in Zengcheng District, Guangzhou, Guangdong, China. It opened on 31 July 2026.

== Features ==
The station is a three-level elevated side-platform station in the middle of the road, with a total length of 210m, a width of 46m, and a total building area of approximately 23,000 square meters. The first floor is a level for airflow, the second floor is the concourse level, and the third floor is the platform level. The station's exterior facade incorporates elements of Niuguzhang Mountain's shape and mountain waterfalls.

The station has two elevated side platforms.

Side station building ground level

Concourse

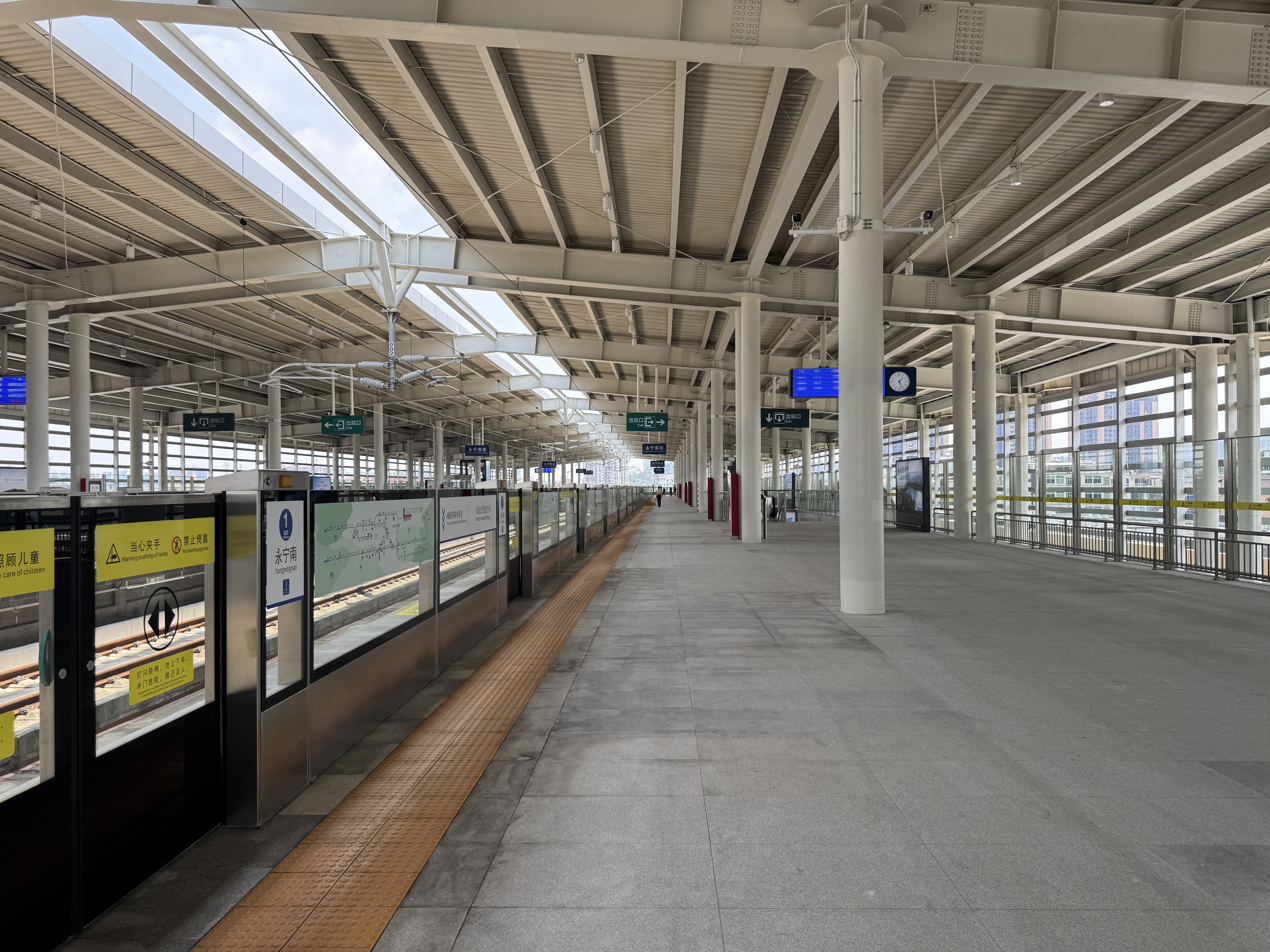
Platform 1

=== Entrances/exits ===
The station has 4 points of entry/exit.

- A: Minbing Road
- B: Xinxin Highway
- C1: Xinxin Highway
- C2: Xinxin Highway
Entrance A

Entrance B

Entrance C1

Entrance C2

== History ==
During planning and construction, the station was called Zengcheng Development Zone station (增城开发区). The station began construction at the end of 2018, and on 17 January 2021, the station topped out. On 2 February the same year, it was officially named Yongning South station.

On 31 July 2026, the station opened with the northern extension of the Suishen intercity railway.
