= Zhenlong railway station =

Guangdong Intercity railway station in Guangzhou, China

Zhenlong 镇龙
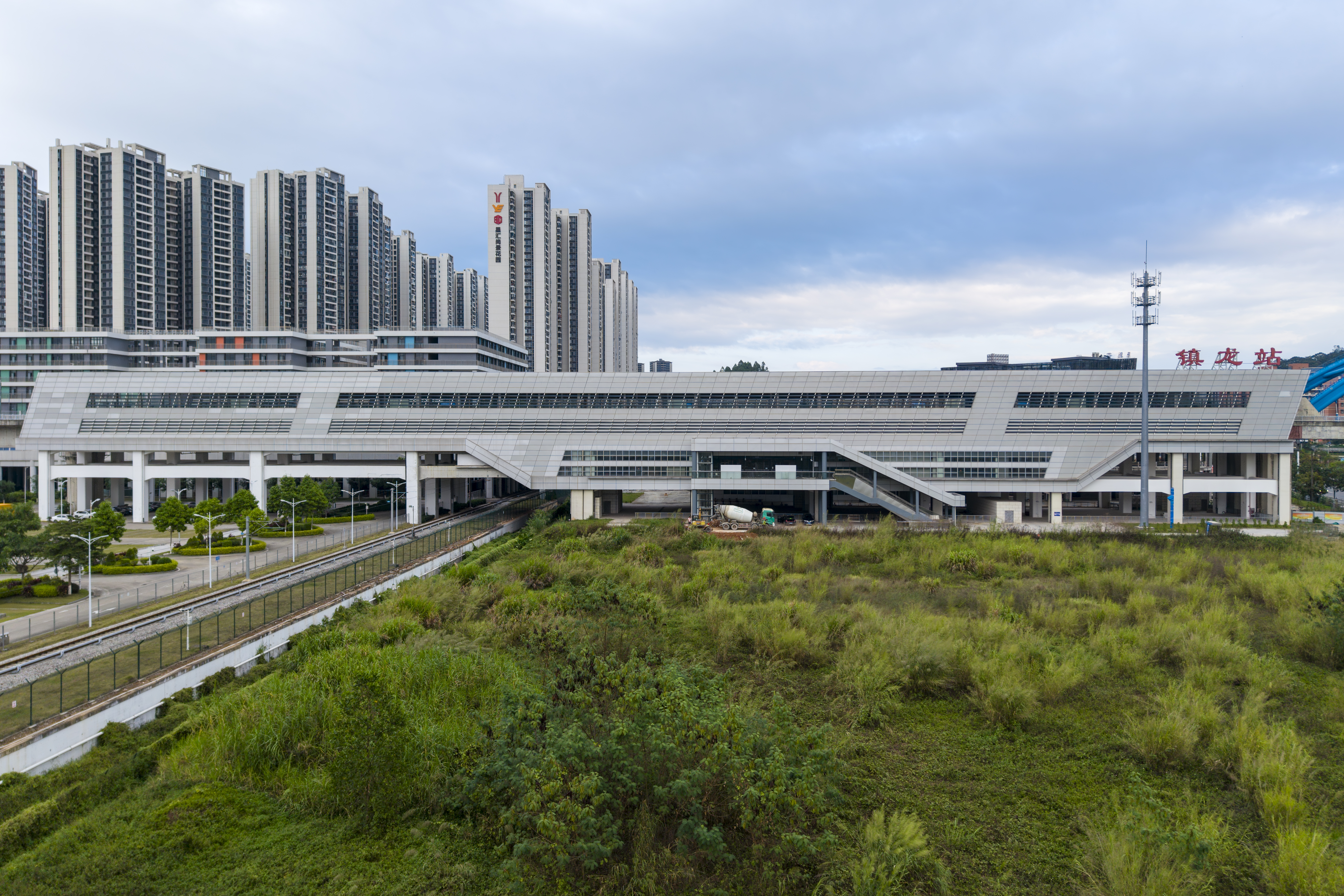
- Exterior (November 2024)

Chinese name
- Simplified Chinese: 镇龙站
- Traditional Chinese: 鎮龍站
Transcriptions
Standard Mandarin
- Hanyu Pinyin: Zhènlóng Zhàn
Yue: Cantonese
- Yale Romanization: Janlùng Jaahm
- Jyutping: zan3 lung4 zaam6

General information
- Location: Northeast side of intersection of Knowledge Avenue (知识大道) and Guangshan Highway (G324); Xinlong, Huangpu District, Guangzhou, Guangdong; China
- Coordinates: 23°17′13.67″N 113°35′10.28″E
- Owner: Pearl River Delta Metropolitan Region intercity railway
- Operator: Guangdong Intercity
- Line: Guangzhou–Shenzhen intercity railway
- Platforms: 2 (2 side platforms)
- Tracks: 2
- Connections: 14 21 Zhenlong

Construction
- Structure type: Elevated
- Accessible: Yes

Other information
- Station code: ZEA (Pinyin: ZLO)

History
- Opened: 31 July 2026 (3 months ago)

Services
| Preceding station | Pearl River Delta Metropolitan Region Intercity Railway | Following station |
|---|---|---|
| Xinlong towards Zhuliao | Guangzhou–Shenzhen intercity railway | Yongning North towards Shenzhen Airport |
Location

Zhenlong railway station (Chinese: 镇龙站; pinyin: Zhènlóng Zhàn; Cantonese Yale: Janlùng Jaahm) is a railway station on Suishen intercity railway located in Huangpu District, Guangzhou, Guangdong, China. It opened on 31 July 2026.

== Features ==
The station has two elevated side platforms. With a total building area of 14,441 square meters, it is the largest span-elevated side-platform station on the entire line.

=== Structure ===
The station's first floor is a parking lot, the second floor is the concourse, the third floor is the cable mezzanine and track beams, and the fourth floor are the platforms and platform canopies.

=== Concourse and platforms ===
The concourse is located on the second floor, and a two-story side station building is also located on the west side of the station. The station is double track with two side platforms.

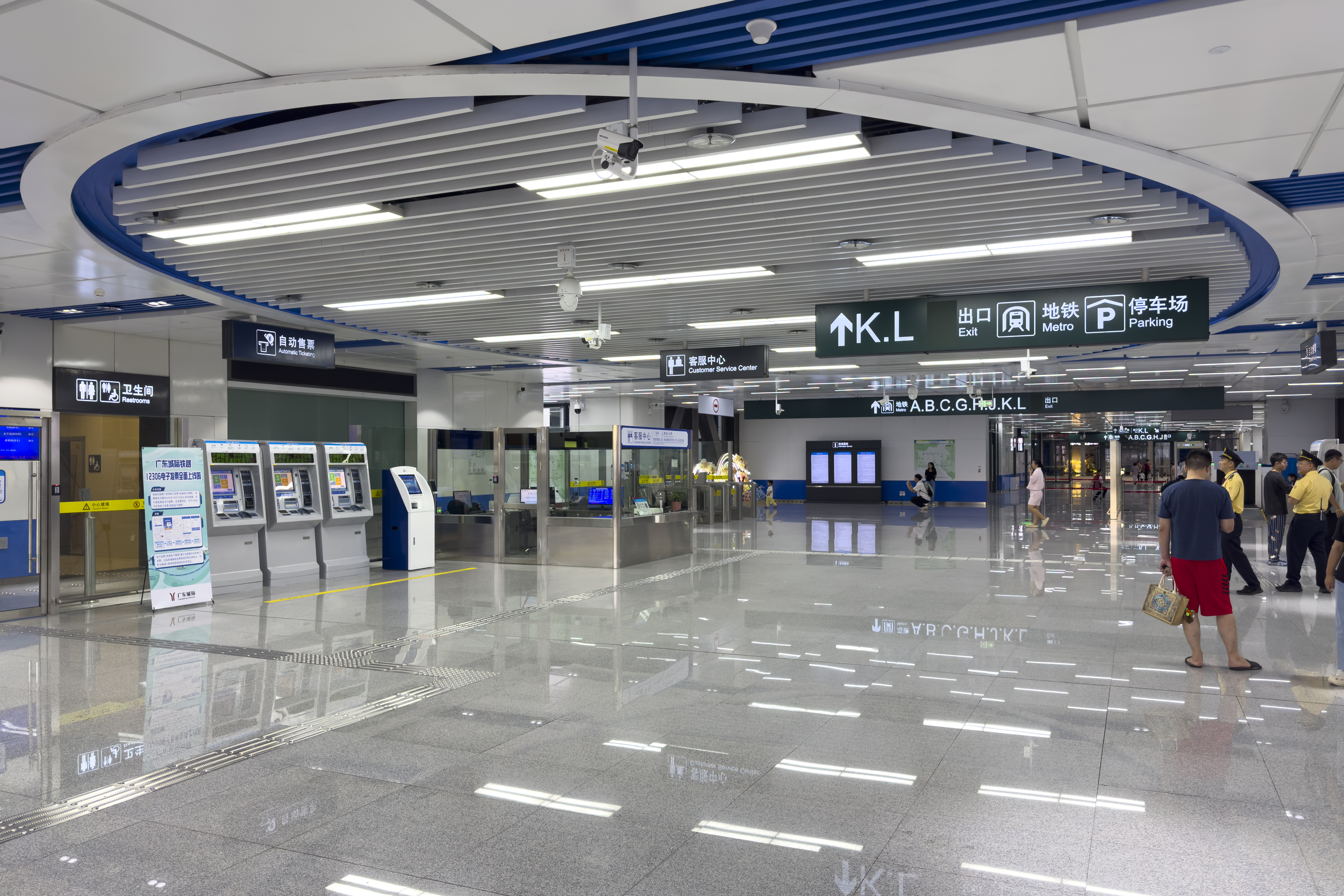
Concourse

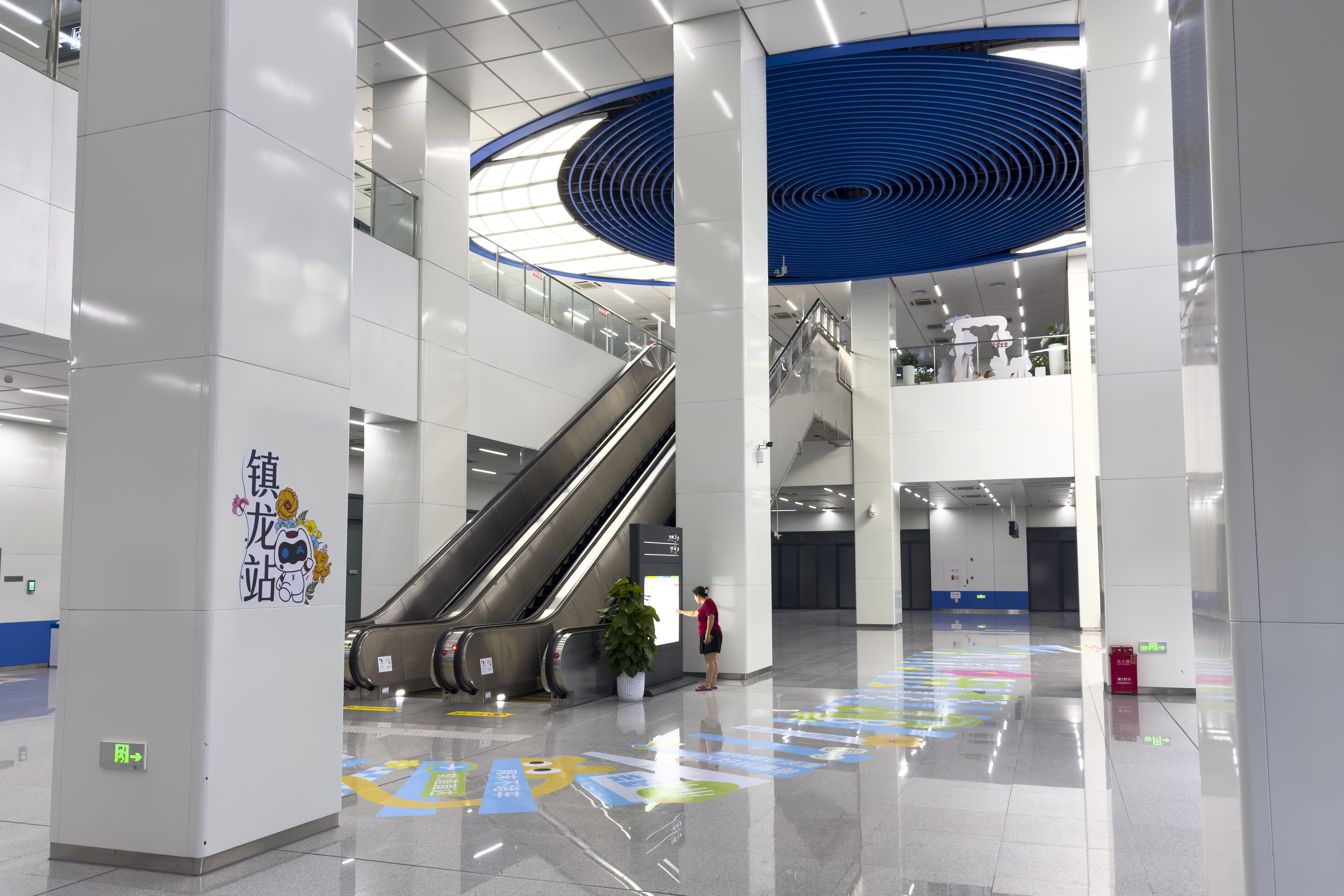
Side station building

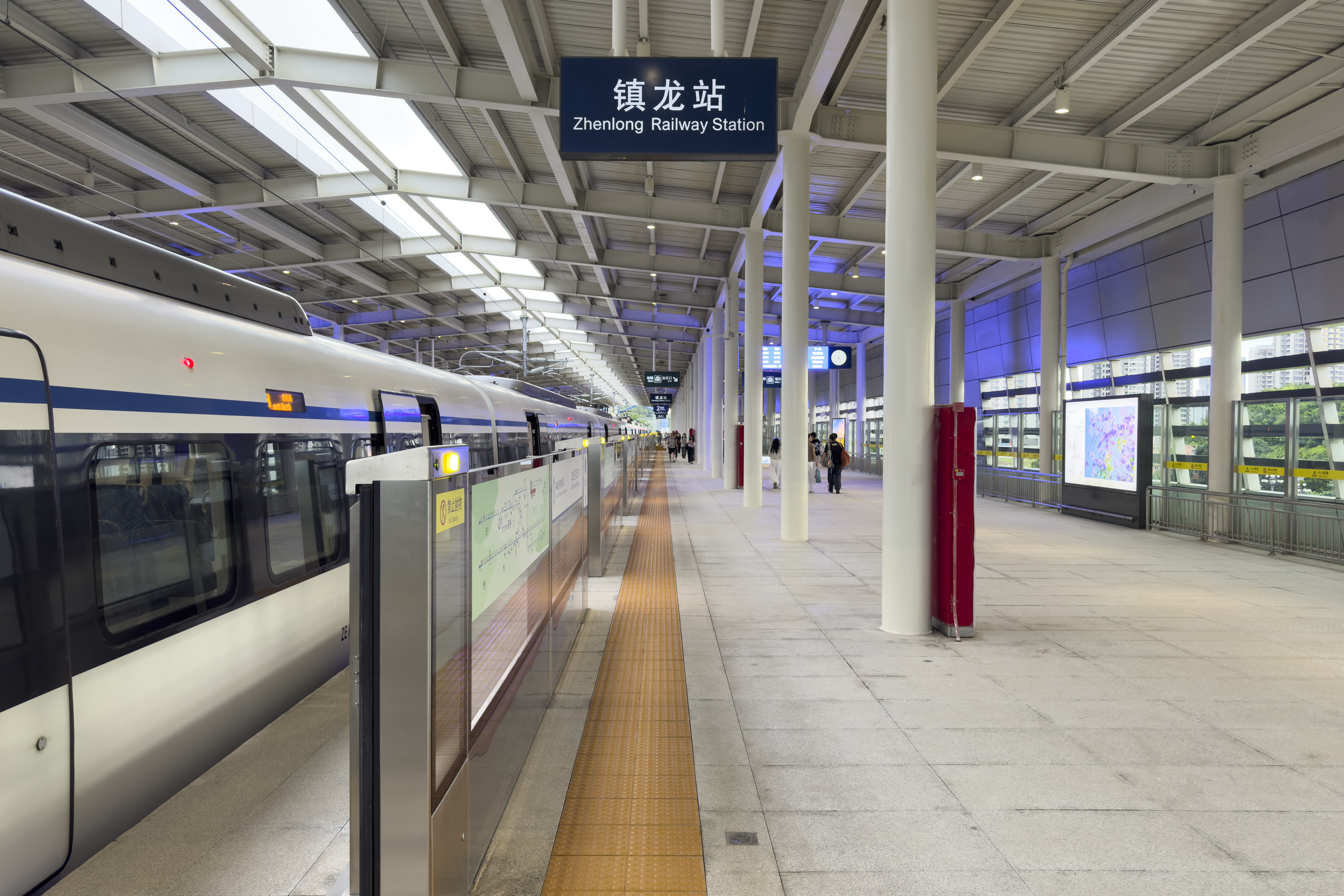
Platform 2 (towards Zhuliao and Baiyun Airport North)

=== Entrances/exits ===
The station has 5 points of entry/exit, currently only 3 have been opened. To distinguish it from the A-J entrances/exits of the metro station with the same name, the entrances/exits of the intercity station are lettered starting from "K". In addition, an unassigned passage on the second floor provides direct access to Entrance J of the metro station.

Exit M, which connects to the concourse, and Exit N, located in the side station building and leading to the first floor of the metro station, are not yet in use.

==== Concourse ====
- ~~M~~: (not open)

==== Side station building surface level ====
- K: Guangshan Highway, 14 21 Zhenlong
- L: Guangshan Highway
- ~~N~~: (not open)

==== Side station building second floor ====
- Metro Passage: 14 21 Zhenlong
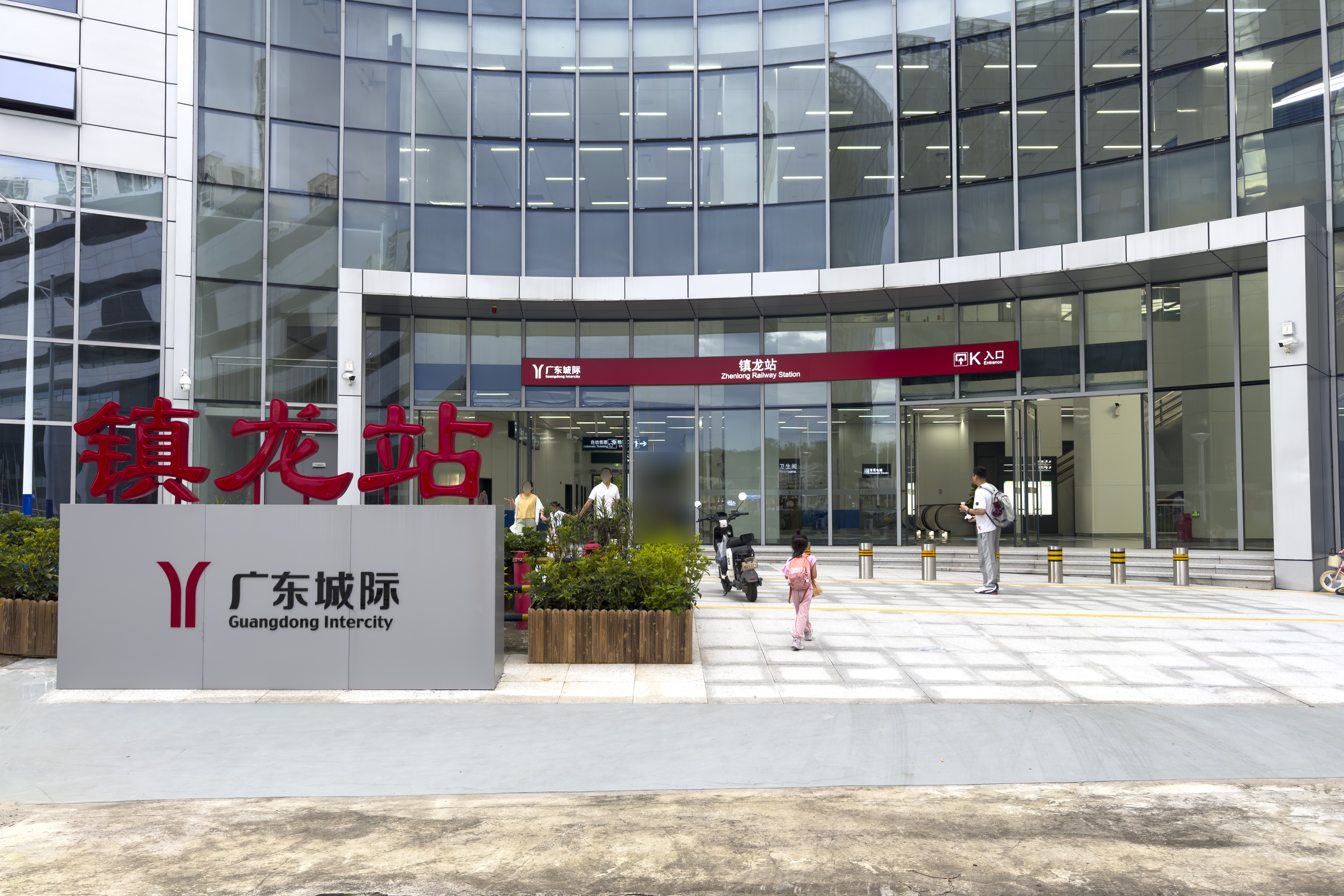
Entrance K

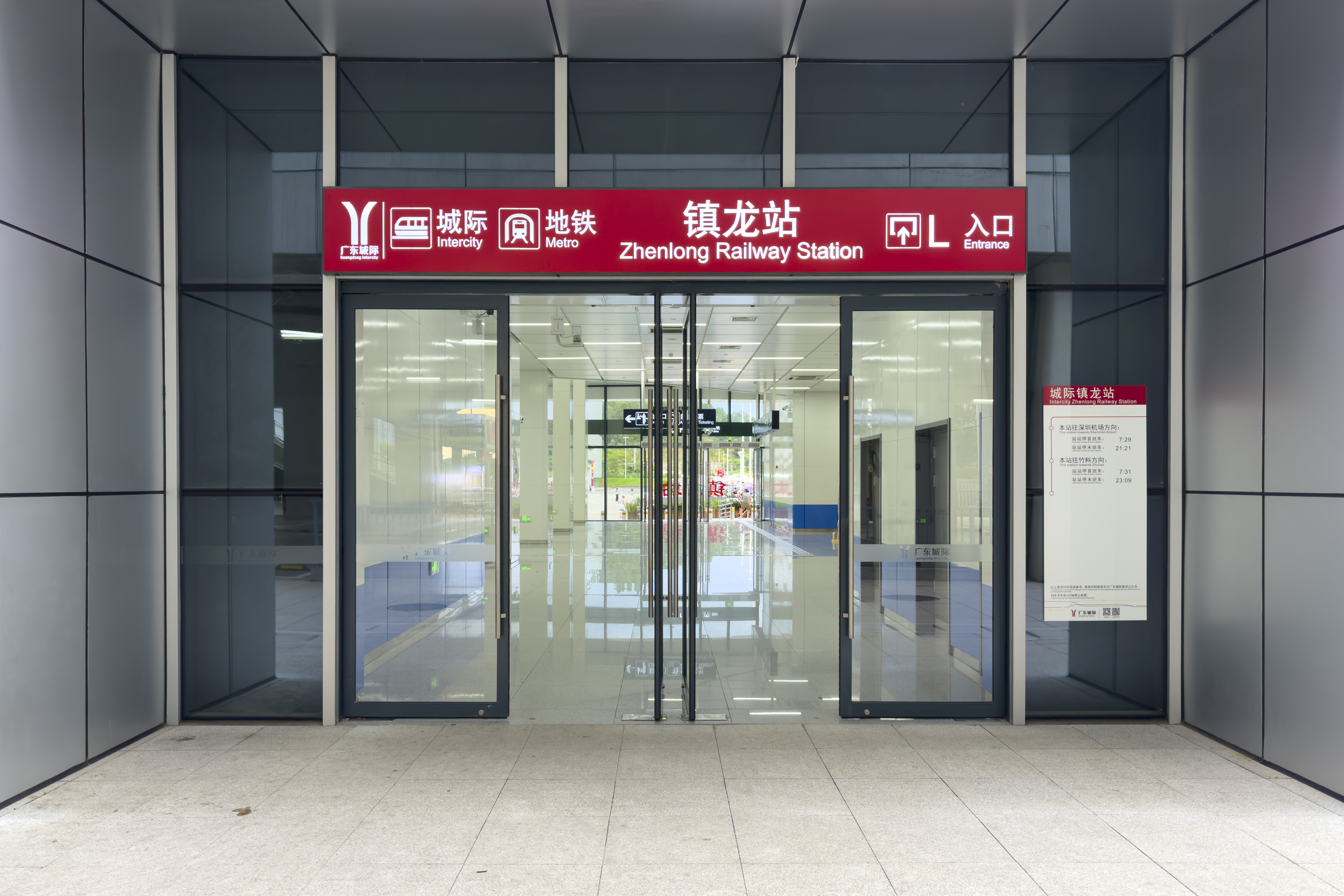
Entrance L

Entrance M (not open)

Entrance N (not open)

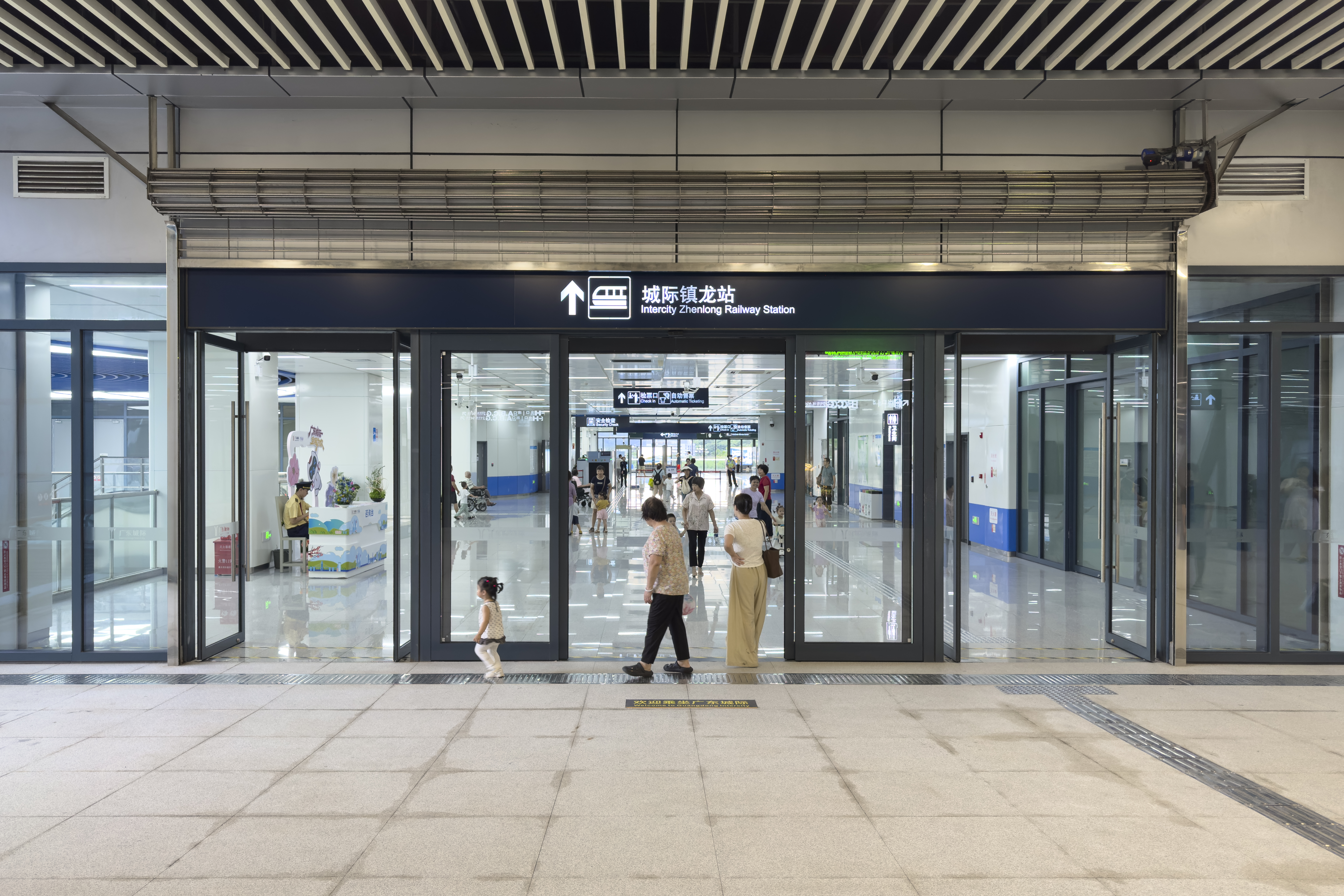
Exit to metro station

== Transfer ==
The station has a passage connecting to Zhenlong metro station, allowing passengers to exit and transfer to Line 14 (Knowledge City Branch) and Line 21. There is also a bus stop opposite Exit K.

== History ==
The concourse floor was poured on 15 June 2017. The station passed project acceptance on 25 May 2019, becoming the first station on the Xinbaiguang Intercity Railway to complete construction and pass acceptance. On 2 February 2021, the station name was officially announced as Zhenlong station.

On 31 July 2026, the station opened with the northern extension of the Suishen intercity railway.
