= Xintang South railway station =

Railway station in Guangzhou, China

Xintangnan 新塘南
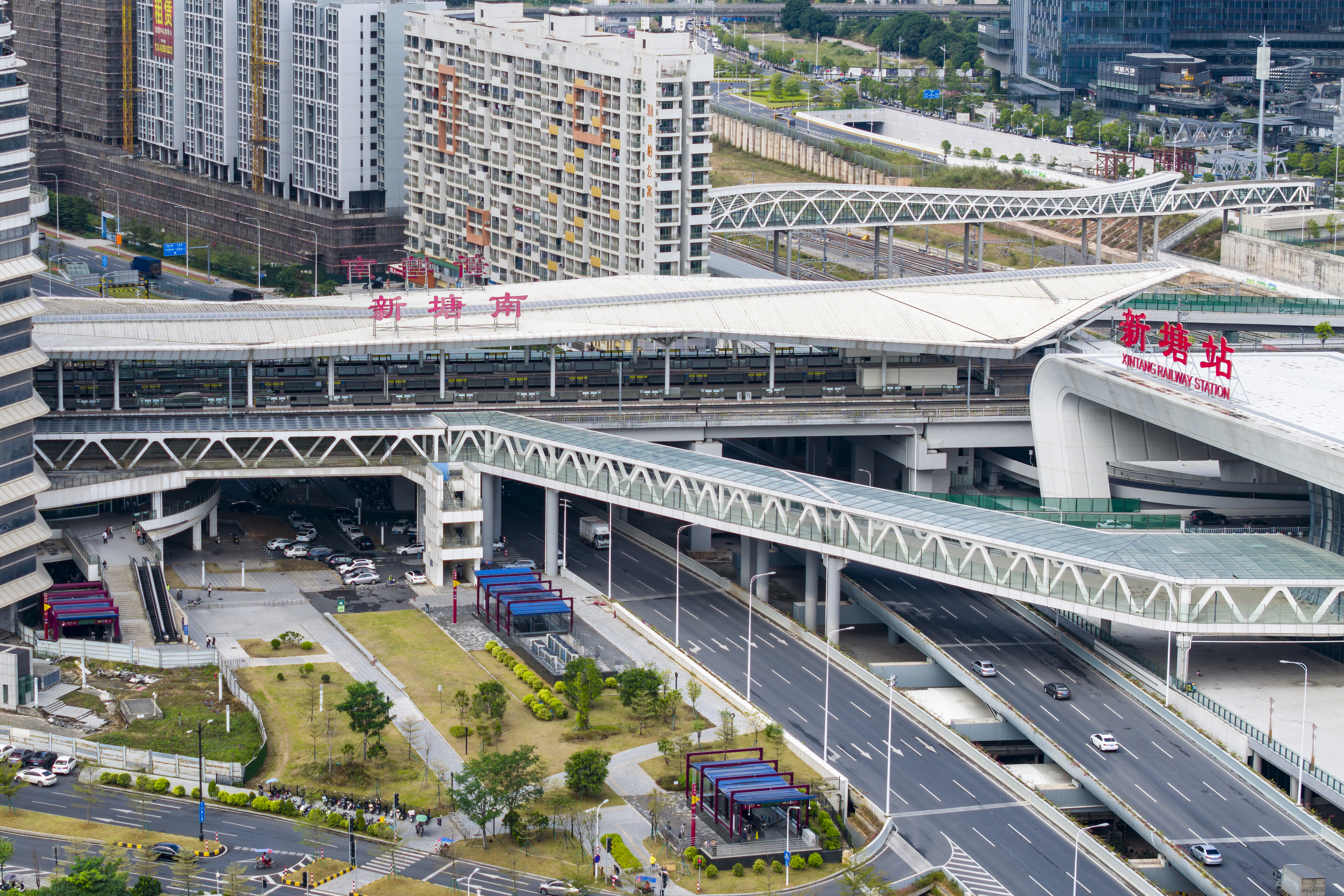
- Exterior

Chinese name
- Chinese: 新塘南站
Transcriptions
Standard Mandarin
- Hanyu Pinyin: Xīntáng Nán Zhàn
Yue: Cantonese
- Yale Romanization: Sāntòhng Nàahm Jaahm
- Jyutping: San^{1}tong^{4} Naam^{4} Zaam^{6}

General information
- Location: Xintang Subdistrict, Zengcheng District, Guangzhou, Guangdong; China
- Coordinates: 23°08′02″N 113°35′55″E
- Owner: Pearl River Delta Metropolitan Region intercity railway
- Operator: Guangdong Intercity
- Line: Guangzhou–Shenzhen intercity railway
- Platforms: 4 (2 island platforms)
- Tracks: 4
- Connections: Guangzhou Xintang; 13 Xintang

Construction
- Structure type: Elevated
- Accessible: Yes

Other information
- Station code: NUQ (Pinyin: XTN)

History
- Opened: 15 December 2019 (6 years ago)

Services
| Preceding station | Pearl River Delta Metropolitan Region Intercity Railway | Following station |
|---|---|---|
| Yongning South towards Zhuliao | Guangzhou–Shenzhen intercity railway | Zhongtang towards Shenzhen Airport |
Location

Xintang South railway station (Chinese: 新塘南站; pinyin: Xīntáng Nán Zhàn; Cantonese Yale: Sāntòhng Nàahm Jaahm) is a railway station in Zengcheng District, Guangzhou, Guangdong, China. It opened on 15 December 2019.

It takes about 11 minutes to get to Dongguan West railway station, and about 53 minutes to get to Shenzhen Airport railway station from here.

The station has one basement floor and three floors above ground. The station is part of the Guangzhou East Transportation Hub project and is connected to the Kedar Hub International Plaza, which claims to be China's first TOD transportation hub complex.

In addition, the station is also constructing a north concourse and a transfer passageway with Guangzhou Xintang railway station of the National Railway to reduce the distance between the two stations.

== History ==
This station was referred to as Xintang during the planning and construction phases. The construction of the station started on 2 June 2018, and it is the last station to start construction on the Guangzhou–Shenzhen intercity railway. In order to better distinguish between intercity and high-speed rail lines, this station was renamed Xintang South on 8 October 2019. On 15 December of the same year, the station was opened for operation.

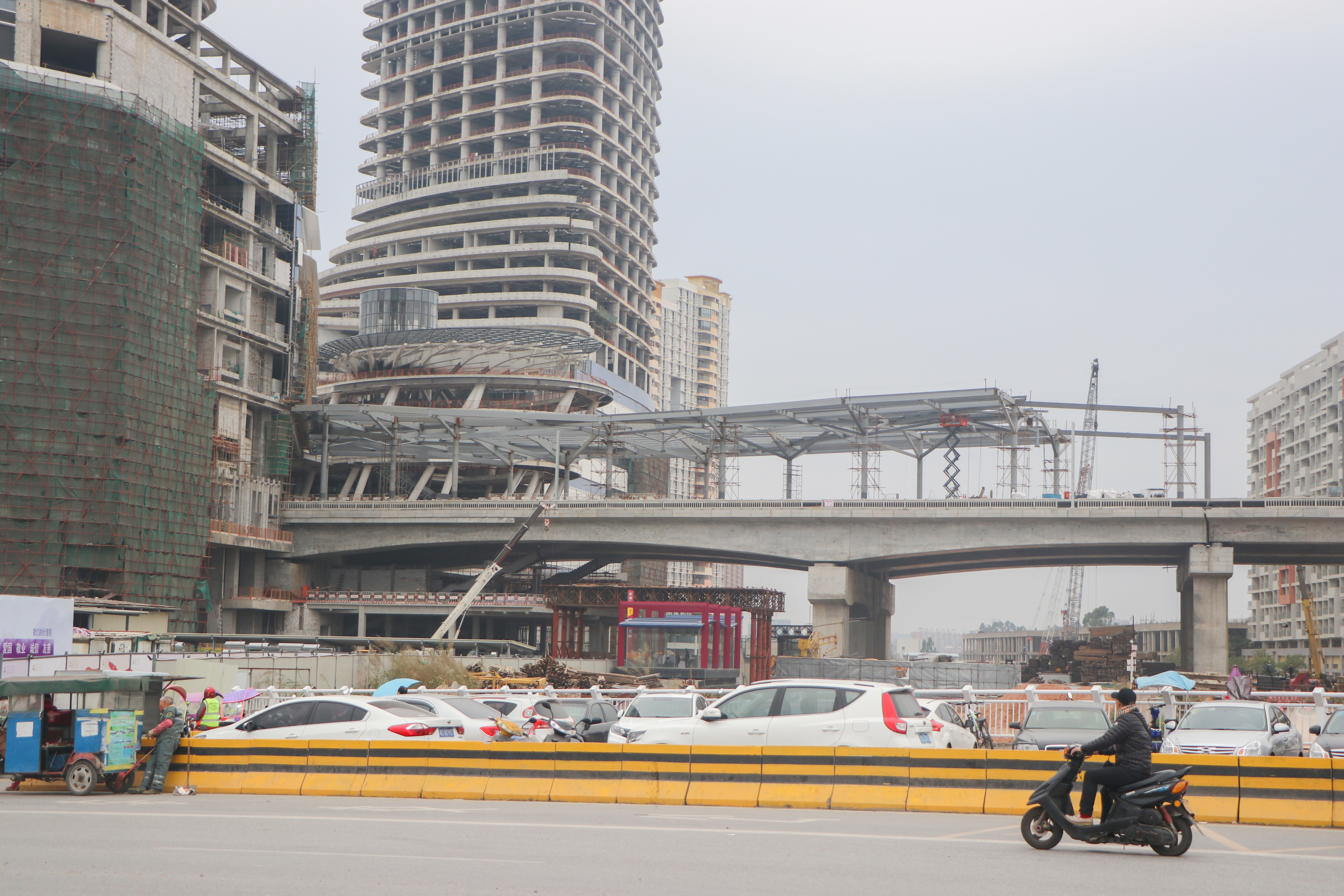
Station under construction (December 2018)

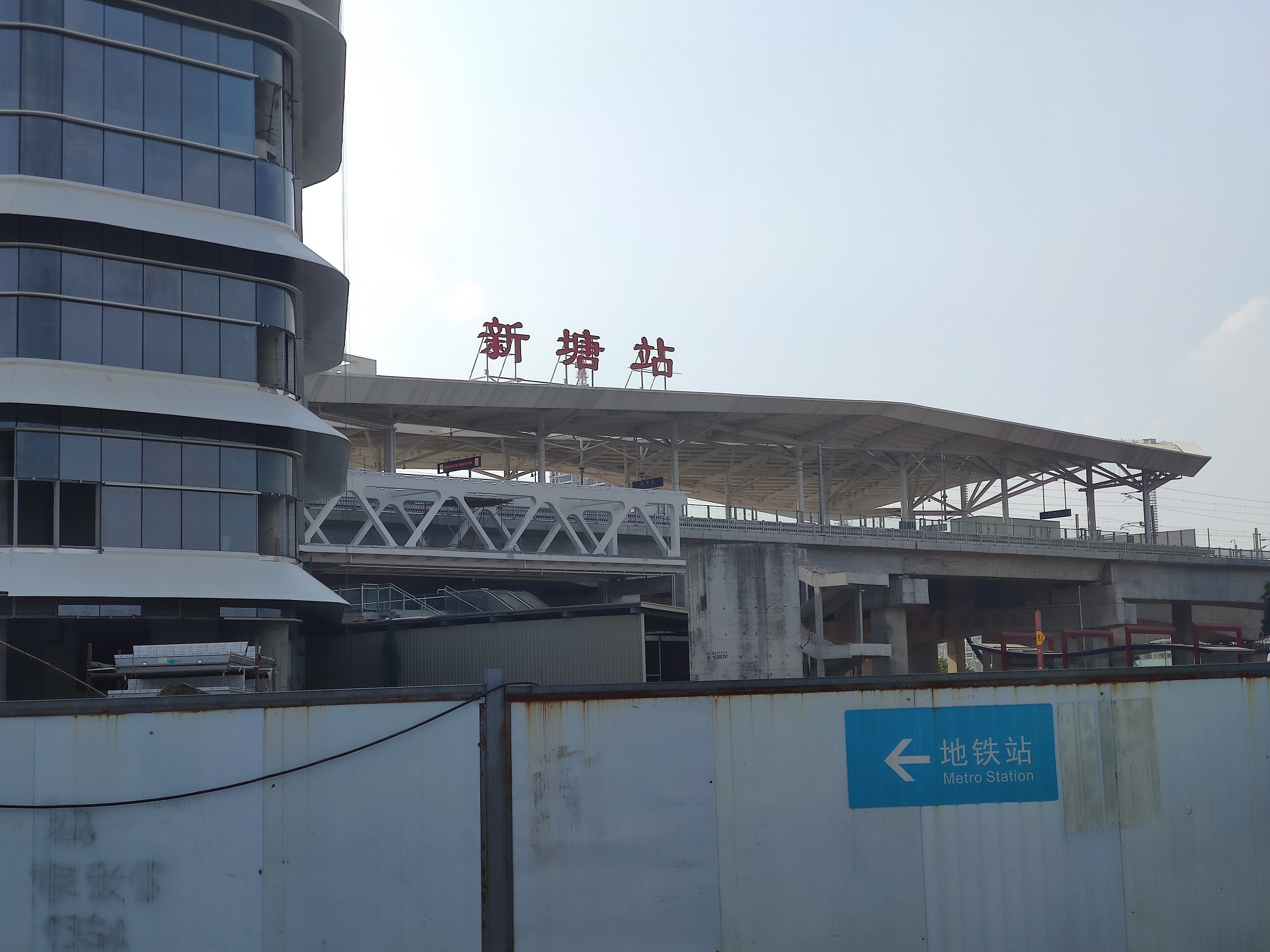
The station when it was still named Xintang (October 2019)

== Gallery ==
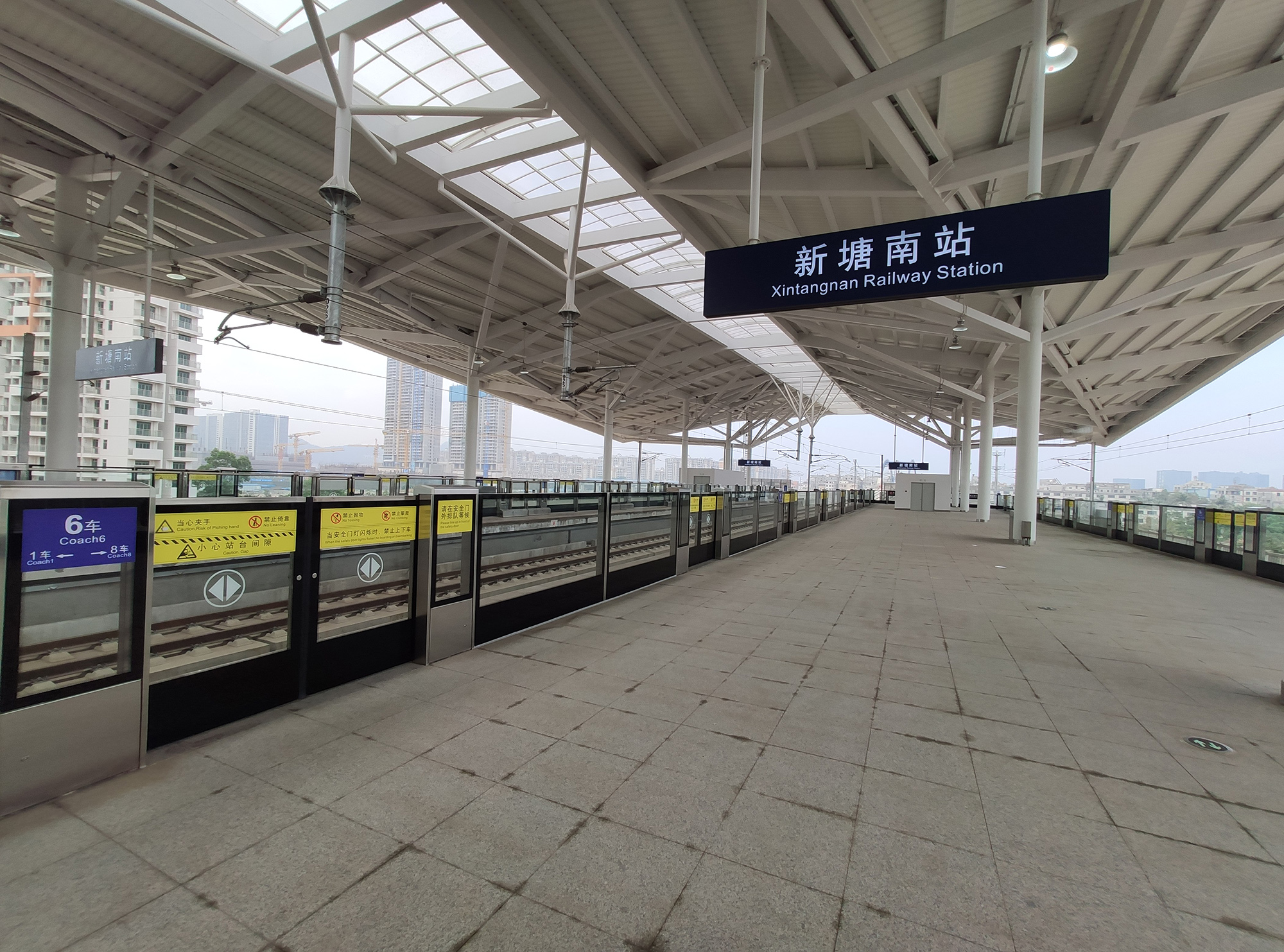
Platform

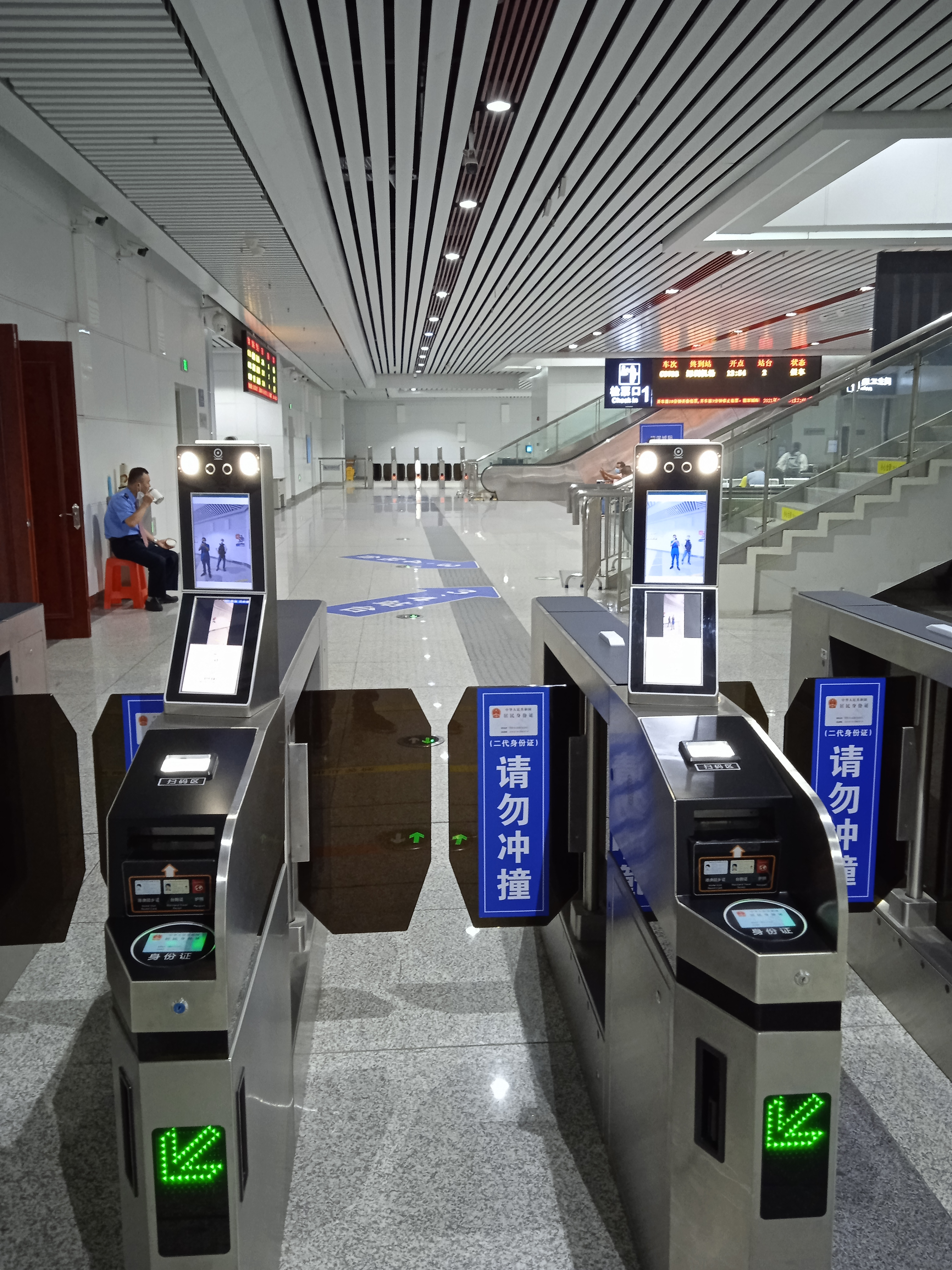
Ticket gates

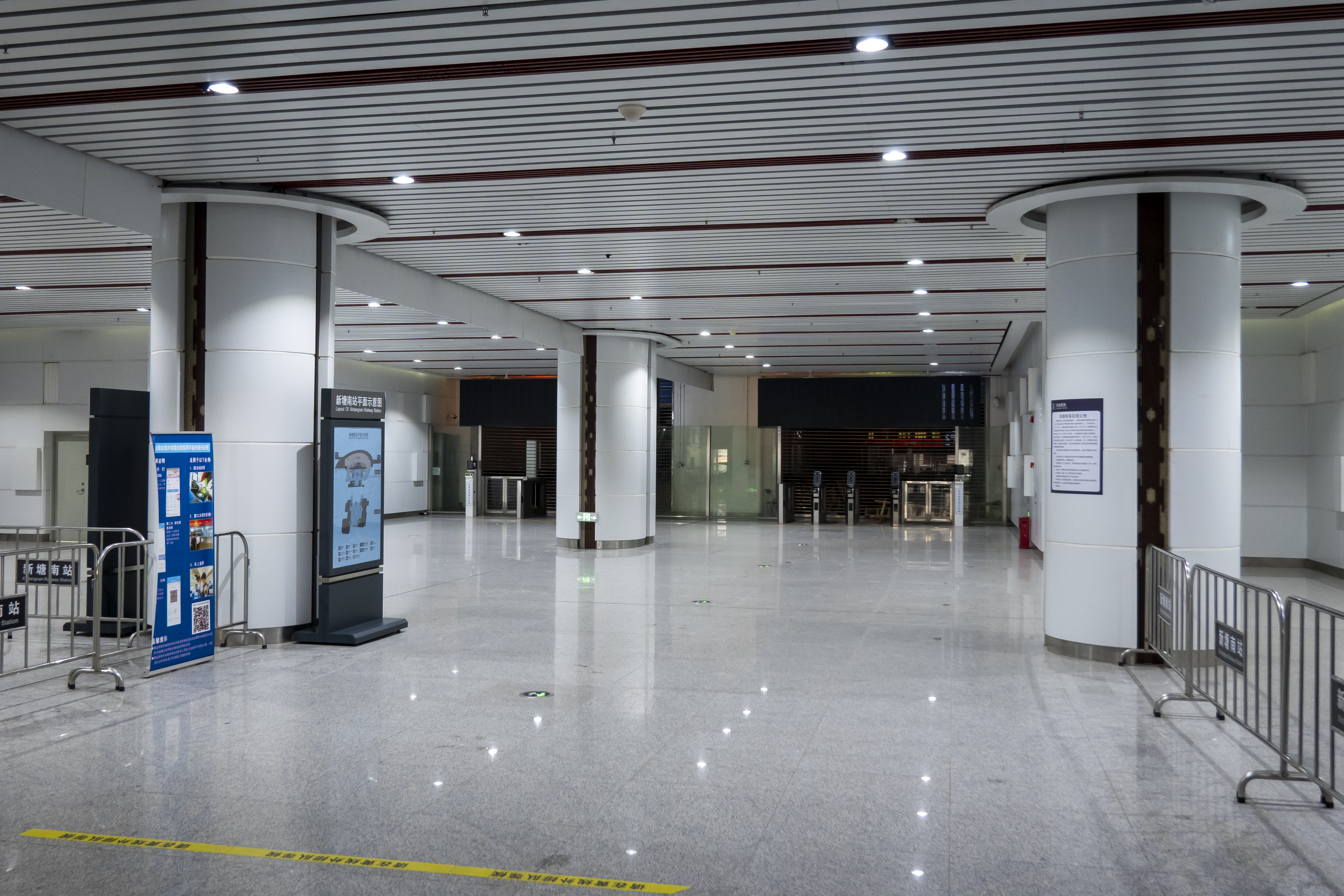
Exit level

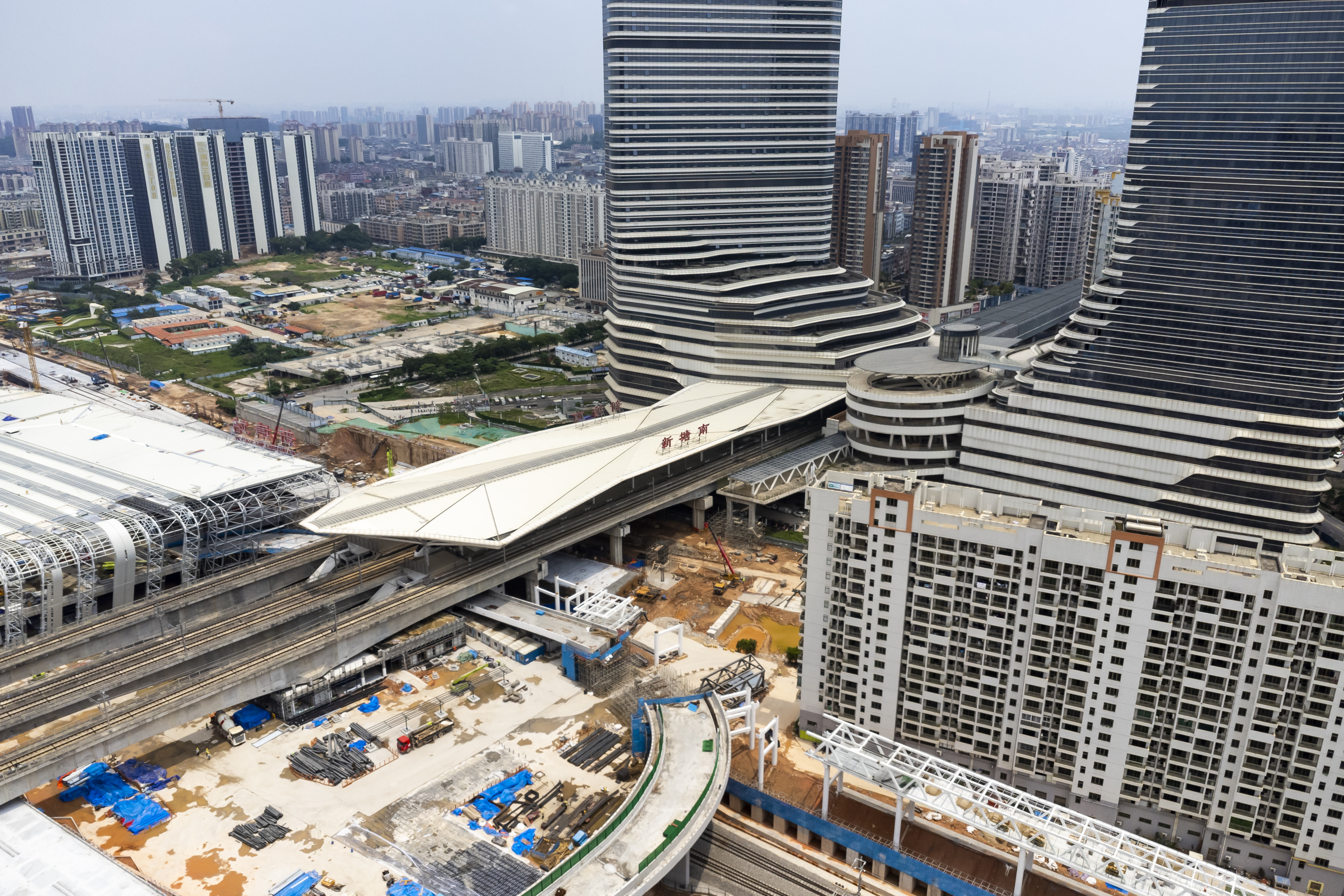
Aerial view of the station
