= Yongning North railway station =

Guangdong Intercity railway station in Guangzhou, China

Yongningbei 永宁北
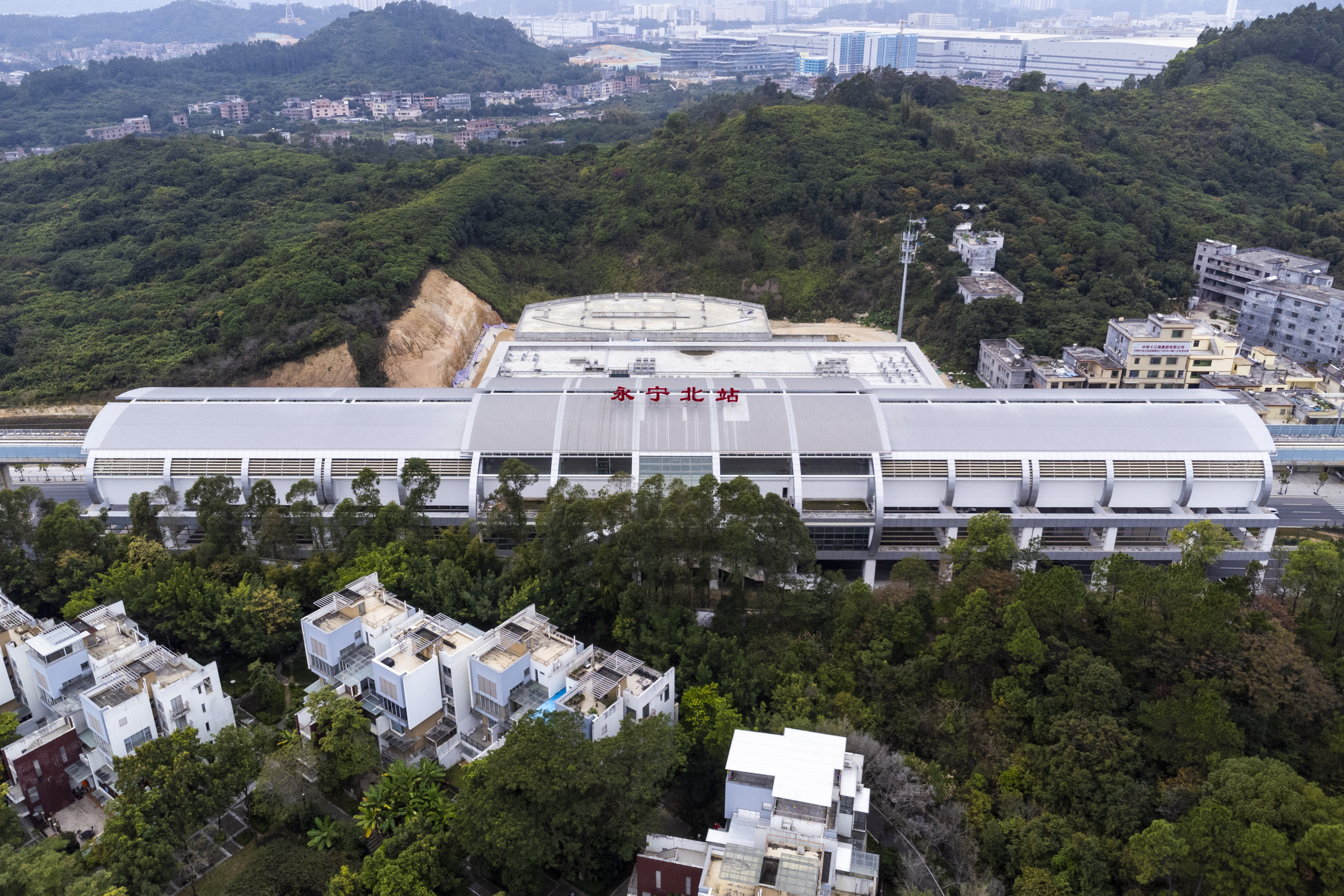
- Exterior (January 2023)

Chinese name
- Simplified Chinese: 永宁北站
- Traditional Chinese: 永寧北站
Transcriptions
Standard Mandarin
- Hanyu Pinyin: Yǒngníng Běi Zhàn
Yue: Cantonese
- Yale Romanization: Wíhngnìhng Bāk Jaahm
- Jyutping: wing5 ning4 bak1 zaam6

General information
- Location: Xinxin Avenue North (新新大道北); Yongning Subdistrict, Zengcheng District, Guangzhou, Guangdong; China
- Coordinates: 23°13′1.56″N 113°35′47″E
- Owner: Pearl River Delta Metropolitan Region intercity railway
- Operator: Guangdong Intercity
- Line: Guangzhou–Shenzhen intercity railway
- Platforms: 2 (2 side platforms)
- Tracks: 2

Construction
- Structure type: Elevated
- Accessible: Yes

Other information
- Station code: YVA (Pinyin: YNB)

History
- Opened: 31 July 2026 (3 months ago)

Services
Preceding station	Pearl River Delta Metropolitan Region Intercity Railway	Following station
Zhenlong towards Zhuliao	Guangzhou–Shenzhen intercity railway	Yongning South towards Shenzhen Airport
Location

Yongning North railway station (Chinese: 永宁北站; pinyin: Yǒngníng Běi Zhàn; Cantonese Yale: Wíhngnìhng Bāk Jaahm) is a railway station on Suishen intercity railway located in Zengcheng District, Guangzhou, Guangdong, China. It opened on 31 July 2026.

== Features ==
The station is a three-story elevated side-platform station with the first floor being a level for airflow, the second floor being a concourse level, and the third floor being a platform level, with a total building area of approximately 25,000 square meters. The station building design incorporates elements of lychee.

A supporting building is planned to be located on the west side of the station, where the Guangzhou Metropolitan Area Intercity Railway Dispatch System Disaster Recovery Center will be situated.

The station has two elevated side platforms.

Side station building

Concourse

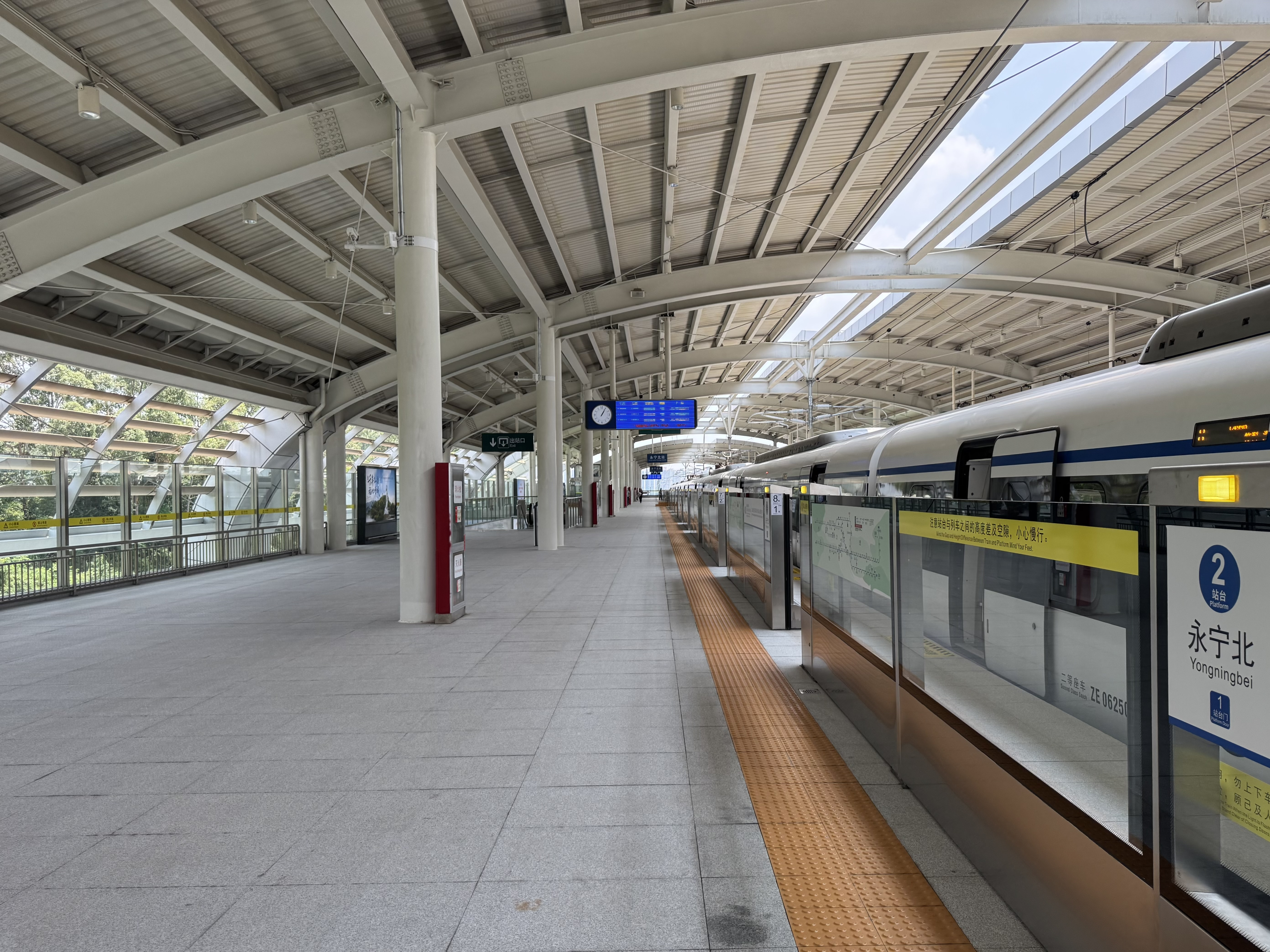
Platform 2

=== Entrances/exits ===
The station has 4 points of entry/exit, of which 2 are located at the side station building on the station's west side, and the other 2 are located on the station's east side.

- A: Xinxin Avenue
- B: Xinxin Avenue
- C1: Xinxin Avenue
- C2: Xinxin Avenue
Entrance A

Entrance B

Entrance C1

Entrance C2

== History ==
During planning and construction, the station was called Lihu Lake City station (荔湖城). On 2 February 2021, it was officially named Yongning North station.

The station topped out on 1 October 2019. On 31 July 2026, the station opened with the northern extension of the Suishen intercity railway.
