= Guangzhou–Shenzhen intercity railway =

Railway line in China

Guangzhou–Shenzhen intercity railway (Suishen intercity railway)
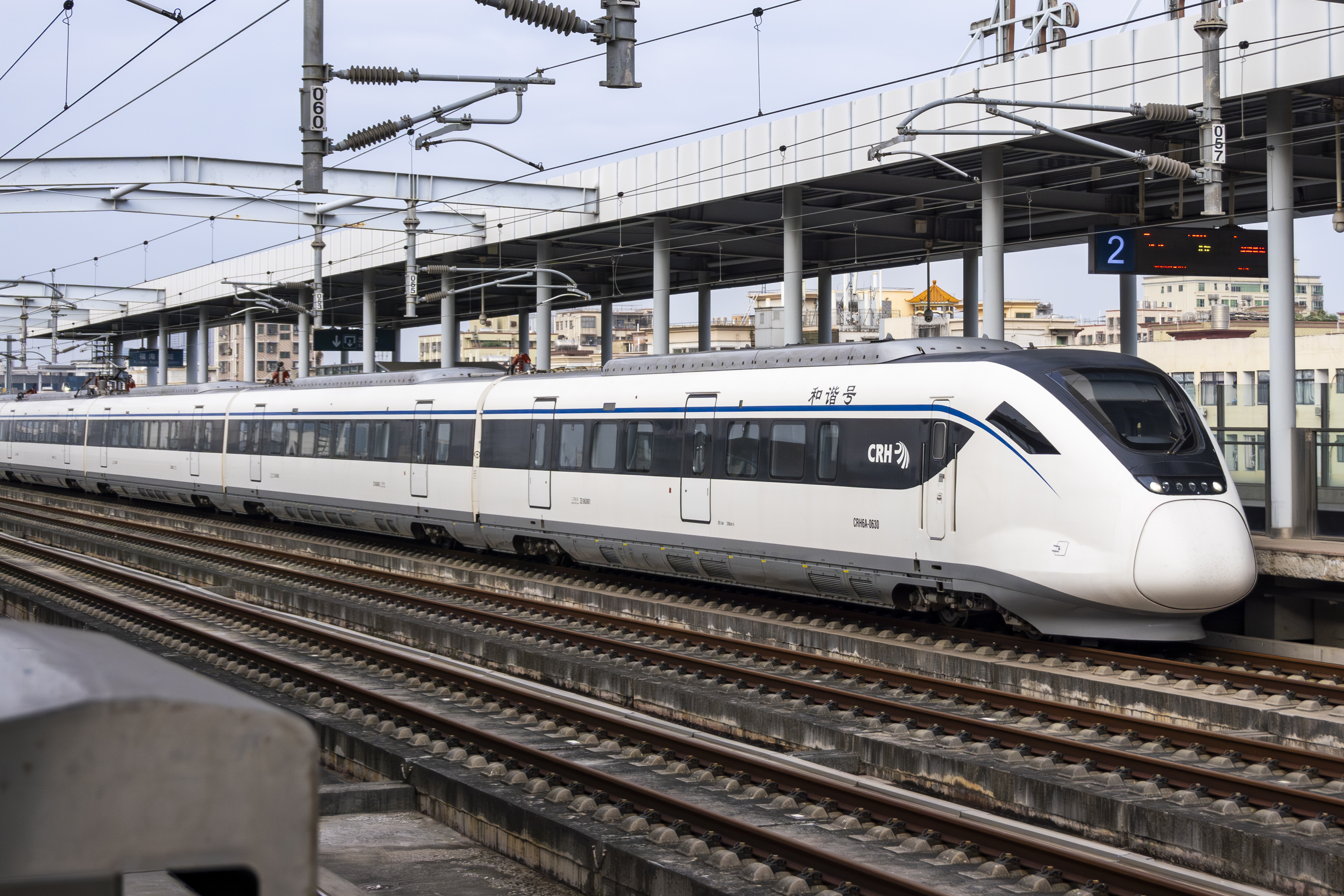
- Train entering Fuhai West railway station

Overview
- Native name: 穗深城际铁路
- Locale: Guangdong province: Guangzhou, Dongguan, Shenzhen
- Termini: Zhuliao; Shenzhen Airport
- Stations: 23 (in operation)

Service
- Type: Higher-speed regional rail
- System: Pearl River Delta Metropolitan Region Intercity Railway
- Operator: Guangdong Intercity Railway Operation Co., Ltd.
- Rolling stock: CRH6A

History
- Opened: 15 December 2019 (6 years ago)

Technical
- Line length: 73 km (45 mi) (Xintang South–Shenzhen Airport section); 48.2 km (30 mi) (Zhongluotan East-Yongning South section).
- Num of tracks: Double-track
- Track gauge: 1,435 mm (4 ft 8 1/2 in) standard gauge
- Minimum radius: 1,100–1,500 m (0.68–0.93 mi; 3,600–4,900 ft)
- Electrification: 25 kV 50 Hz AC (Overhead lines)
- Operating speed: 140 km/h (87 mph)
- Maximum incline: 3.0%

Guangzhou–Shenzhen intercity railway or Suishen intercity railway (Chinese: 穗深城际铁路; Jyutping: seoi^{6} sam^{1} sing^{4} zai^{3} tit^{3} lou^{6}; pinyin: Suì-Shēn Chéngjì Tiělù) (Note: Sui (穗) is the Chinese abbreviation of Guangzhou.) is a commuter railway in the Pearl River Delta of Guangdong, China. The construction route traces roughly along the east bank of the Pearl River, connecting Guangzhou, Dongguan and Shenzhen Bao'an International Airport. It will feature a length of 73.996 km (45.979 mi) from Xintang South to Shenzhen Airport, operating at a top speed of 140 km/h (87 mph) using CRH6A trains.

This is the third railway between Guangzhou and Shenzhen, after Guangzhou–Shenzhen railway and Guangzhou–Shenzhen–Hong Kong Express Rail Link.

== History ==
Route planning in 2009 within Guangzhou changed several times and then a big change, with Xintang in Guangzhou's Zengcheng District chosen as the originating point, straight into Hongmei, Dongguan. This changed the access to the Guangzhou Metro to Line 13, with future access to the planned Line 16. Guangzhou–Dongguan–Shenzhen intercity railway originally planned to through operate into Shenzhen Metro's Line 11 to Futian station in central Shenzhen. However, in September 2010, it was announced that this railway will no longer enter through operate via Line 11 into Shenzhen city center and designed as a separate railway service.

=== Chronology ===
- 21 December 2008 – Construction started.
- 25 November 2009 – Dongguan–Changan segment started
- 6 June 2012 – Deletion of Mayong station from plans.
- 21 September 2012 – Dongguan–Shenzhen section started.
- 17 October 2012 – Planning extends to Guangzhou East railway station, with renovating and running alongside the Guangzhou-Shenzhen Railway corridor and the transformation of Jishan and Shipai stations will be upgraded for intercity use.
- 6 December 2012 – Shenzhen route basically established, with two sites in Shenzhen: Airport East station and Qianhaiwan station.
- 14 May 2013 – Shenzhen section of the railway adjusted again, terminating at Airport Station, cancelling this line running to Airport East and Qianhaiwan stations.
- 31 July 2026: The section from Yongning South to Zhongluotan East officially commenced operation.

== Station list ==
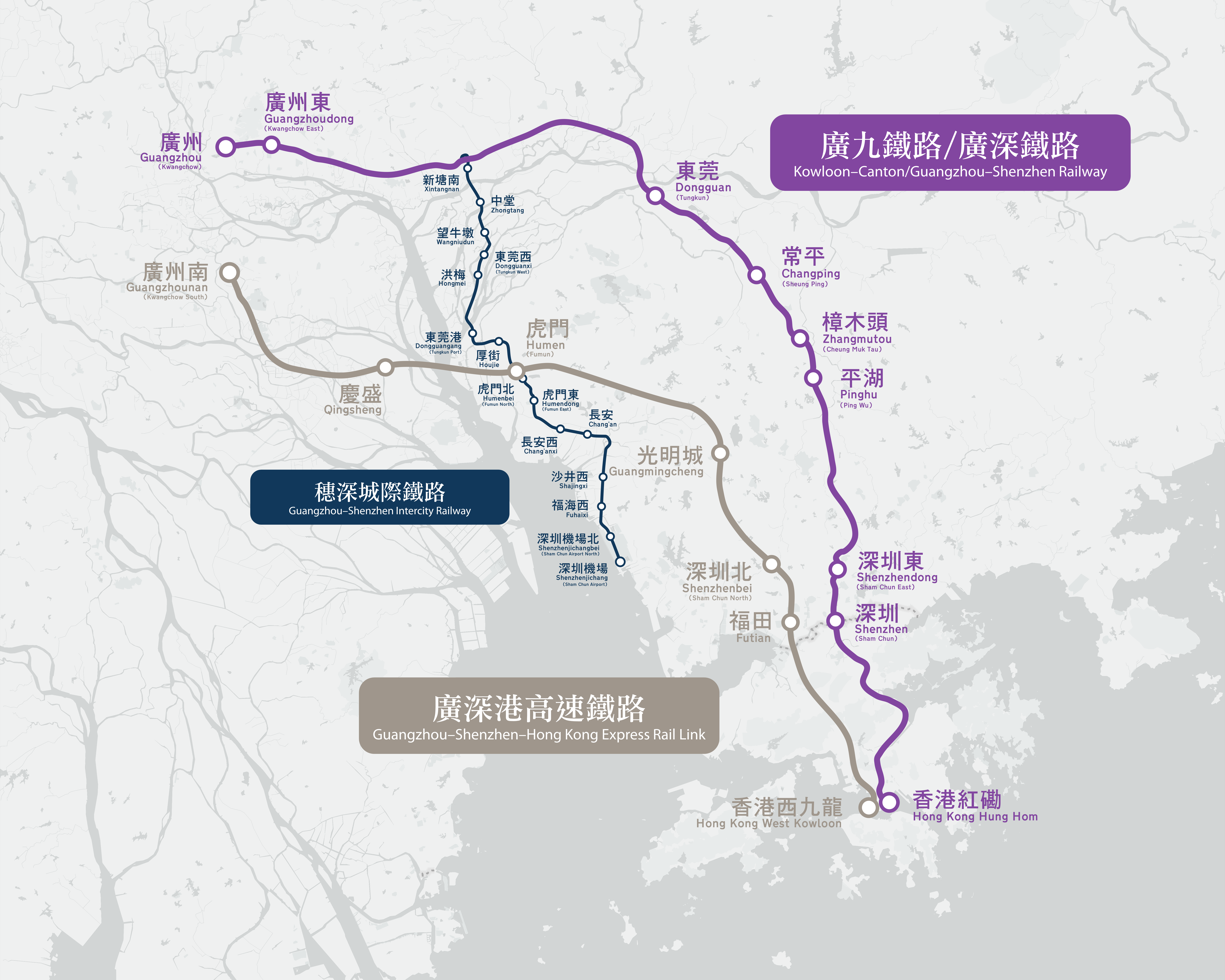
Guangzhou–Shenzhen intercity railway as indicated in blue

Station Name	Chinese	Distance km	Pearl River Delta intercity railway transfers/connections & Airports	Metro transfers/connections	Location
↑ through train to Guangzhou–Foshan circular intercity railway GFC
Zhuliao	竹料		ER	14	
Zhongluotan East (Zhongluotandong)	钟落潭东				
Jiufo	九佛			14 via Xinnan	
Folang	佛塱				
Xinlong	新龙				
Zhenlong	镇龙			14 21	
Yongning North (Yongningbei)	永宁北				
Yongning South (Yongningnan)	永宁南				
Xintang South (Xintangnan)	新塘南			13 via Xintang	
Zhongtang	中堂	5.54			
Wangniudun	望牛墩	5.37			
Dongguan West (Dongguanxi)	东莞西	3.49	GH		
Hongmei	洪梅	3.25			
Dongguangang	东莞港	8.59			
Houjie	厚街	5.15			
Humen North (Humenbei)	虎门北	5.34	IUQ GSH	2 via Humen railway station	
Humen East (Humendong)	虎门东	4.08			
Chang'an West (Chang'anxi)	长安西	6.75			
Chang'an	长安	3.75			
Shajing West (Shajingxi)	沙井西	8.28			
Fuhai West (Fuhaixi)	福海西	4.93		12	
Shenzhen Airport North	深圳机场北	4.43		11 20	
Shenzhen Airport	深圳机场	3.82	SZX	11	
Xixiang	西乡				
Bao'an	宝安			5 via Fanshen	
Qianhai	前海		SH SZ	1 5 11 via Qianhaiwan	
Chaojizongbu	超级总部				
Huanggang Checkpoint	皇岗口岸			7	

== Future development ==
=== Southern extension ===
Originally, the Suishen ICR was planned to enter central Shenzhen. The line was cut back to Shenzhen Airport in 2010. The expansion of the line south of Shenzhen Airport was proposed again in 2019 but this time only up to Qianhai. In 2020 China Railway revealed that it might be extended to another Hong Kong border. The extension will be underground, 15.15 km (9.41 mi) long with three stations. In June 2020, NDRC approved a further extension beyond Qianhai deeper in to central Shenzhen. The extension will add about 10 km (6.2 mi) of line and additionally serve Baishizhou and Huanggang Port. The southern extension is expected to be complete in 2026.
