= Zhenlongxi station =

Metro station in Guangzhou, China

Zhenlongxi 镇龙西
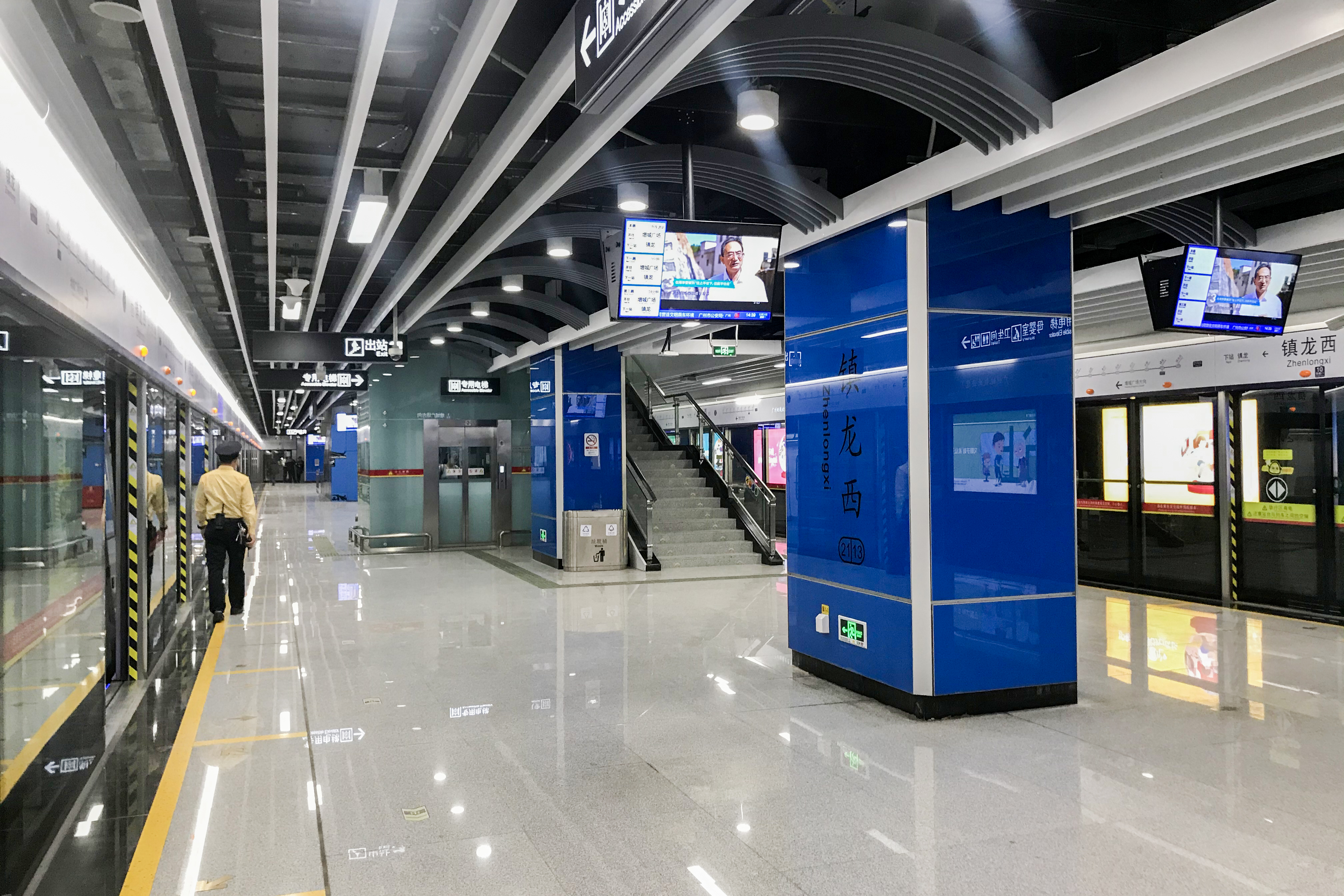
- Platform 3

Chinese name
- Simplified Chinese: 镇龙西站
- Traditional Chinese: 鎮龍西站
Transcriptions
Standard Mandarin
- Hanyu Pinyin: Zhènlóngxī Zhàn
Yue: Cantonese
- Jyutping: zan^{3}lung^{4}sai^{1} zaam^{6}

General information
- Location: Guangshan Highway (G324), Zengcheng District, Guangzhou, Guangdong; China
- Coordinates: 23.281108°N 113.568522°E
- Operated by: Guangzhou Metro Co. Ltd.
- Line: Line 21
- Platforms: 4 (2 island platforms)
- Tracks: 3

Construction
- Structure type: Underground
- Accessible: Yes

Other information
- Station code: 2113

History
- Opened: 28 December 2018; 7 years ago

Services
Preceding station	Guangzhou Metro	Following station
Jinkeng towards Tianhe Park	Line 21	Zhenlong towards Zengcheng Square
Location

Zhenlongxi station (a.k.a. Zhenlong West Station, Chinese: 镇龙西站) is a station of Line 21 of the Guangzhou Metro. It started operations on 28 December 2018. It was the initial terminus of the first phase of Line 21 until the extension to Yuancun on 20 December 2019.

== Exits ==
The station has 3 exits, lettered A, B and D. Exit D is accessible. All exits are located on Zhenlong Avenue.

== Gallery ==
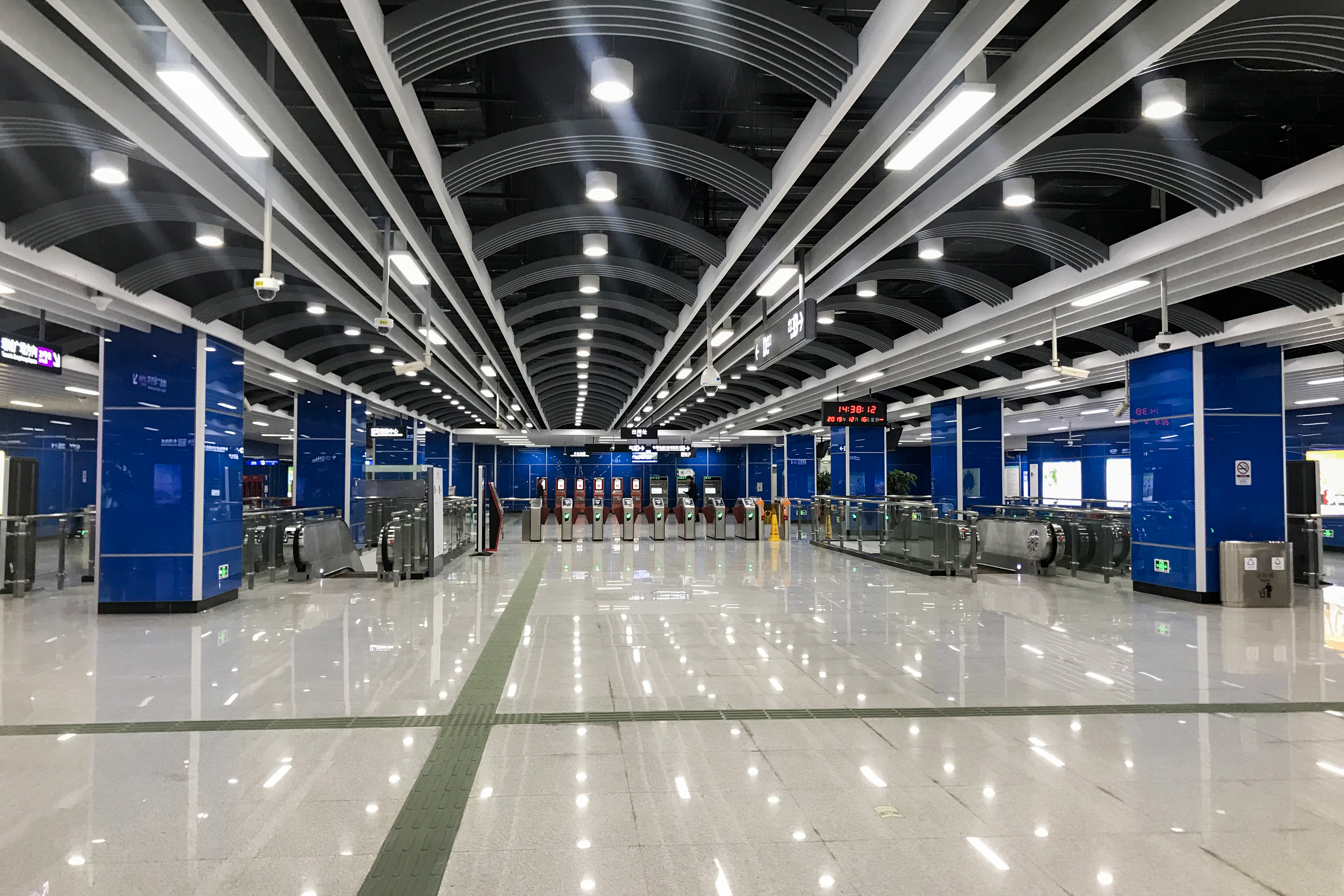
Concourse

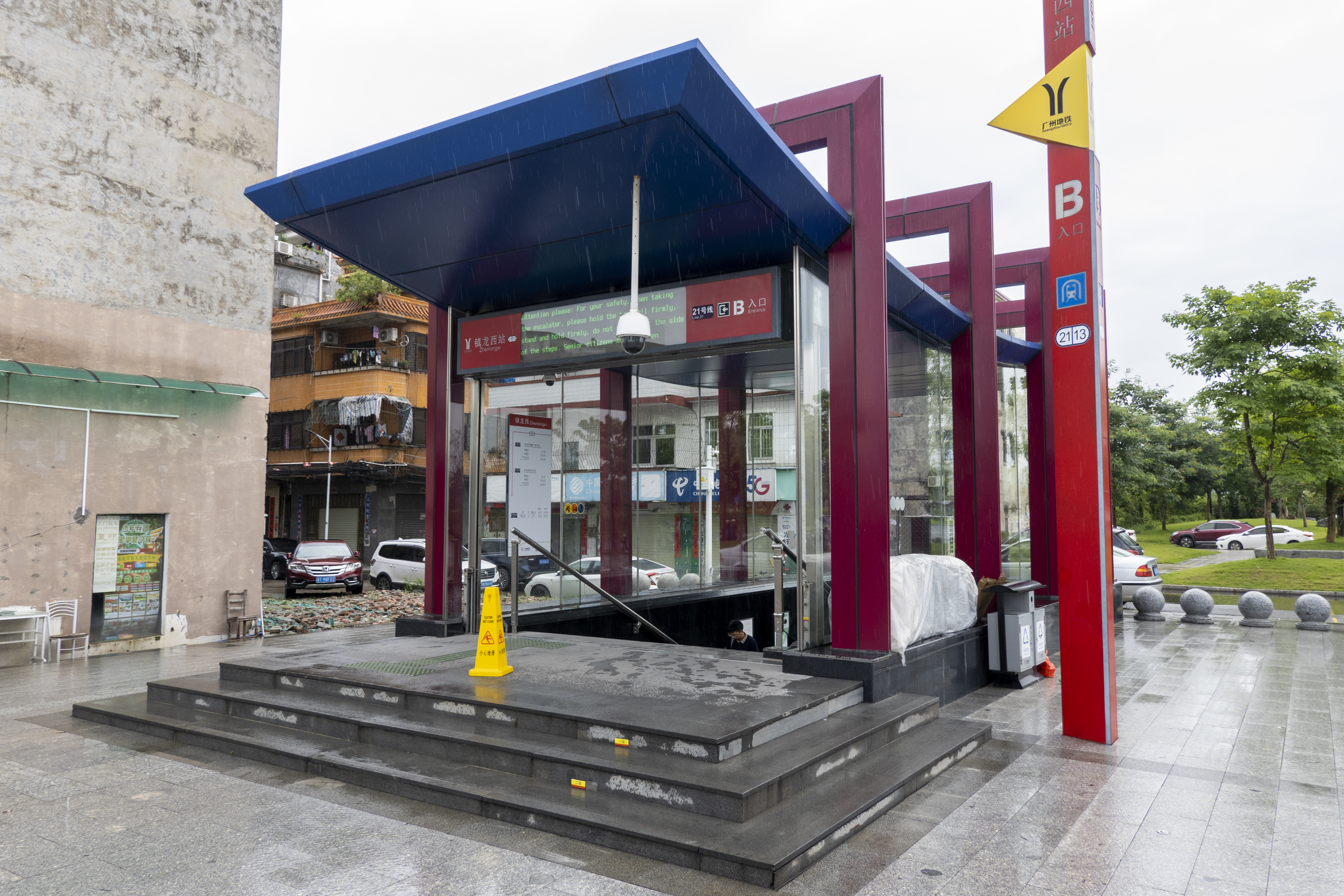
Exit B

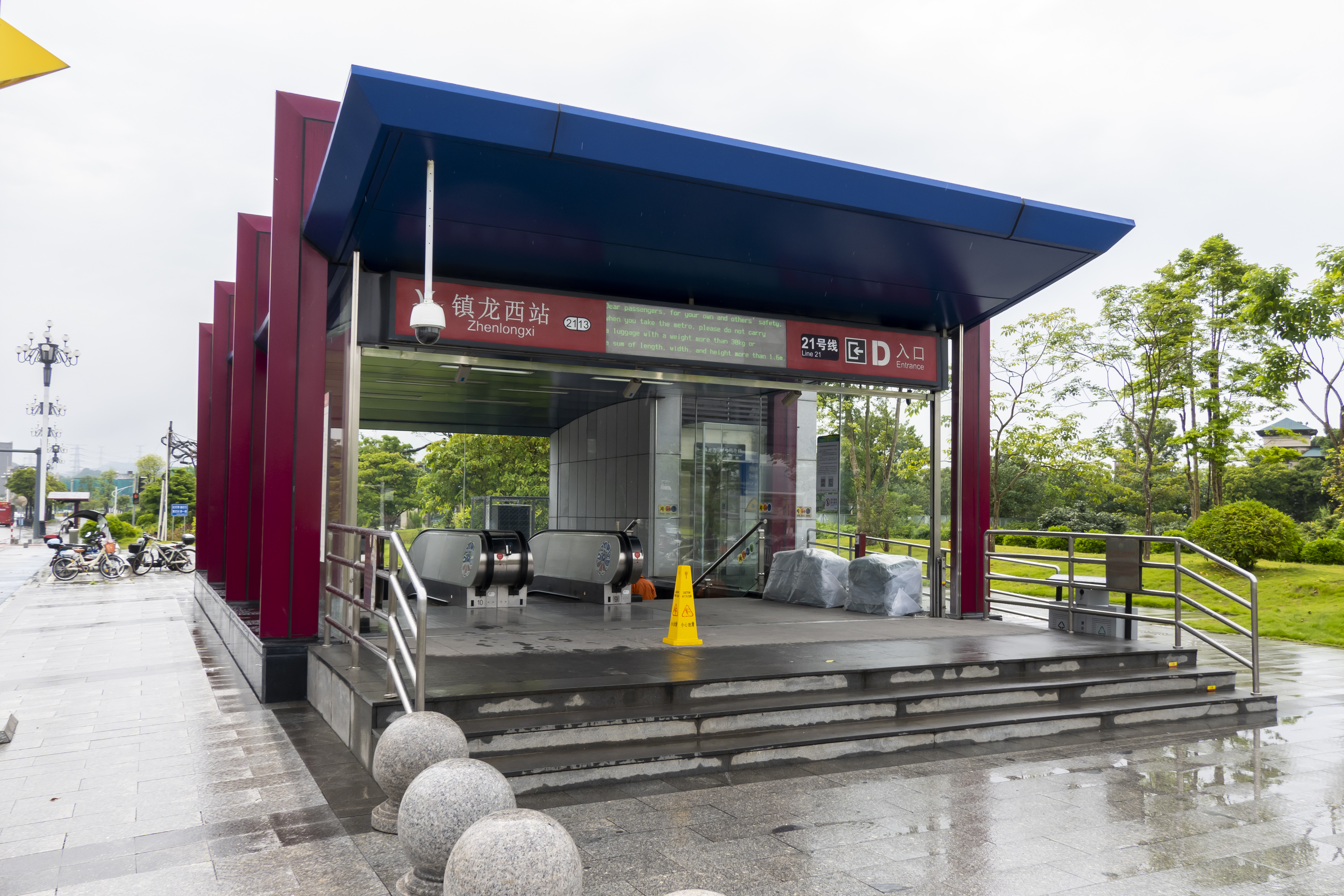
Exit D
