= Jinkeng station =

Metro station in Guangzhou, China

Jinkeng 金坑
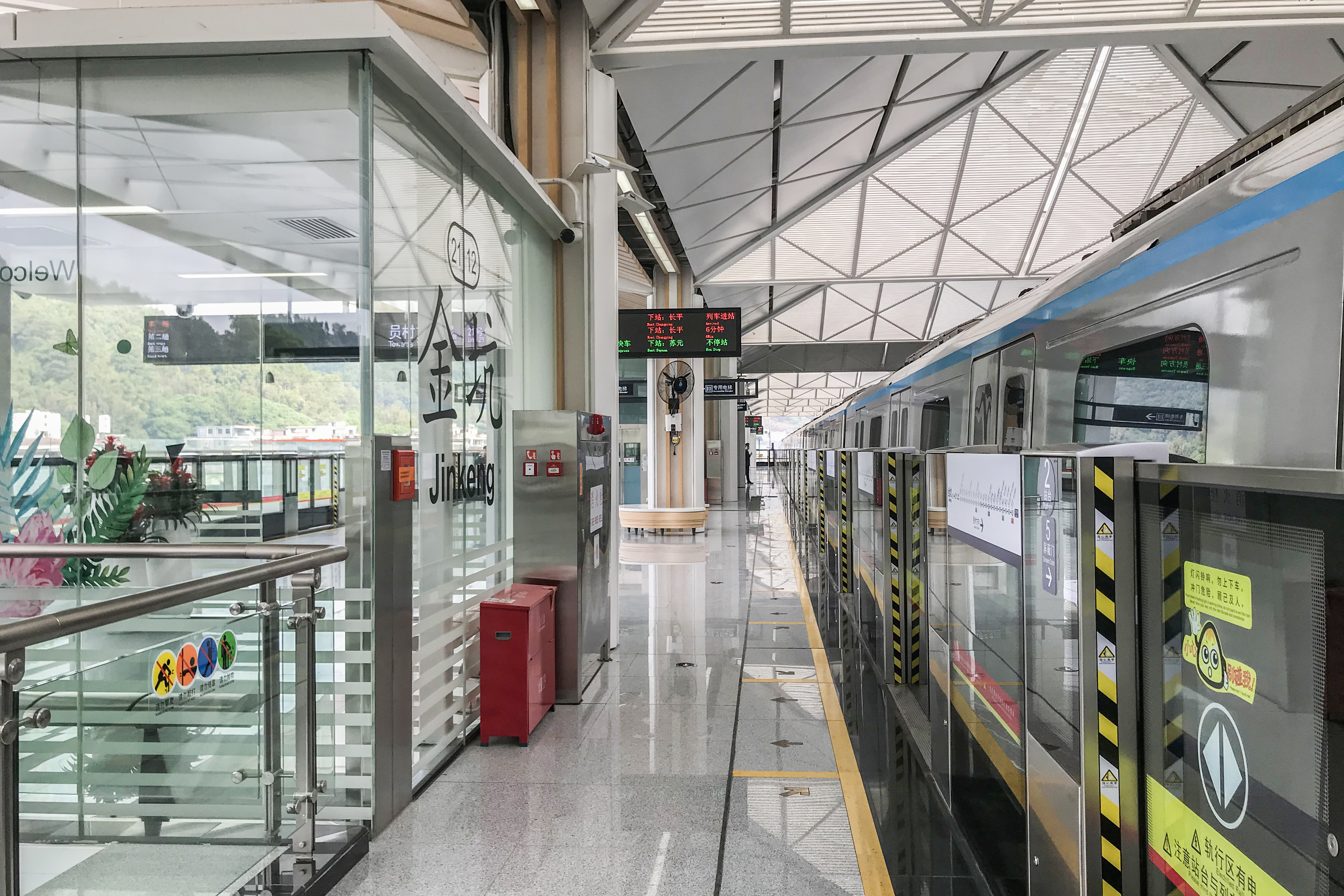
- Platform 2

Chinese name
- Simplified Chinese: 金坑站
- Traditional Chinese: 金坑站
Transcriptions
Standard Mandarin
- Hanyu Pinyin: Jīnkēng Zhàn
Yue: Cantonese
- Jyutping: gam1 haang1 zaan6
- Hong Kong Romanization: Kam Hang station

General information
- Location: Guangshan Highway, Huangpu District, Guangzhou, Guangdong; China
- Operator: Guangzhou Metro Co. Ltd.
- Line: Line 21
- Platforms: 4 (2 island platforms)
- Tracks: 4

Construction
- Structure type: Elevated
- Accessible: Yes

Other information
- Station code: 2112

History
- Opened: 20 December 2019; 6 years ago

Services
Preceding station	Guangzhou Metro	Following station
Changping towards Tianhe Park	Line 21	Zhenlongxi towards Zengcheng Square
Location

Jinkeng station (Chinese: 金坑站) is an elevated station of Line 21 of the Guangzhou Metro. It started operations on 20 December 2019.

On 17 December 2019, Jinkeng Station was awarded the "Three-star Green Building Design Mark Certificate" by the Department of Housing and Urban-Rural Development of Guangdong Province, reaching the highest level in China's green building evaluation standards and becoming the first city rail transit line in mainland China to have a station that has obtained this certificate.

The station has 2 elevated island platforms, numbered 1 & 2 on the inside, and 3 & 4 on the outside. Trains usually stop at the middle 2 platforms (platforms 1 and 2), with the express trains also passing through the middle tracks.

== Exits ==
There are 2 exits, lettered A and B. Both exits are accessible and are located on Guangshan Highway.

== Gallery ==
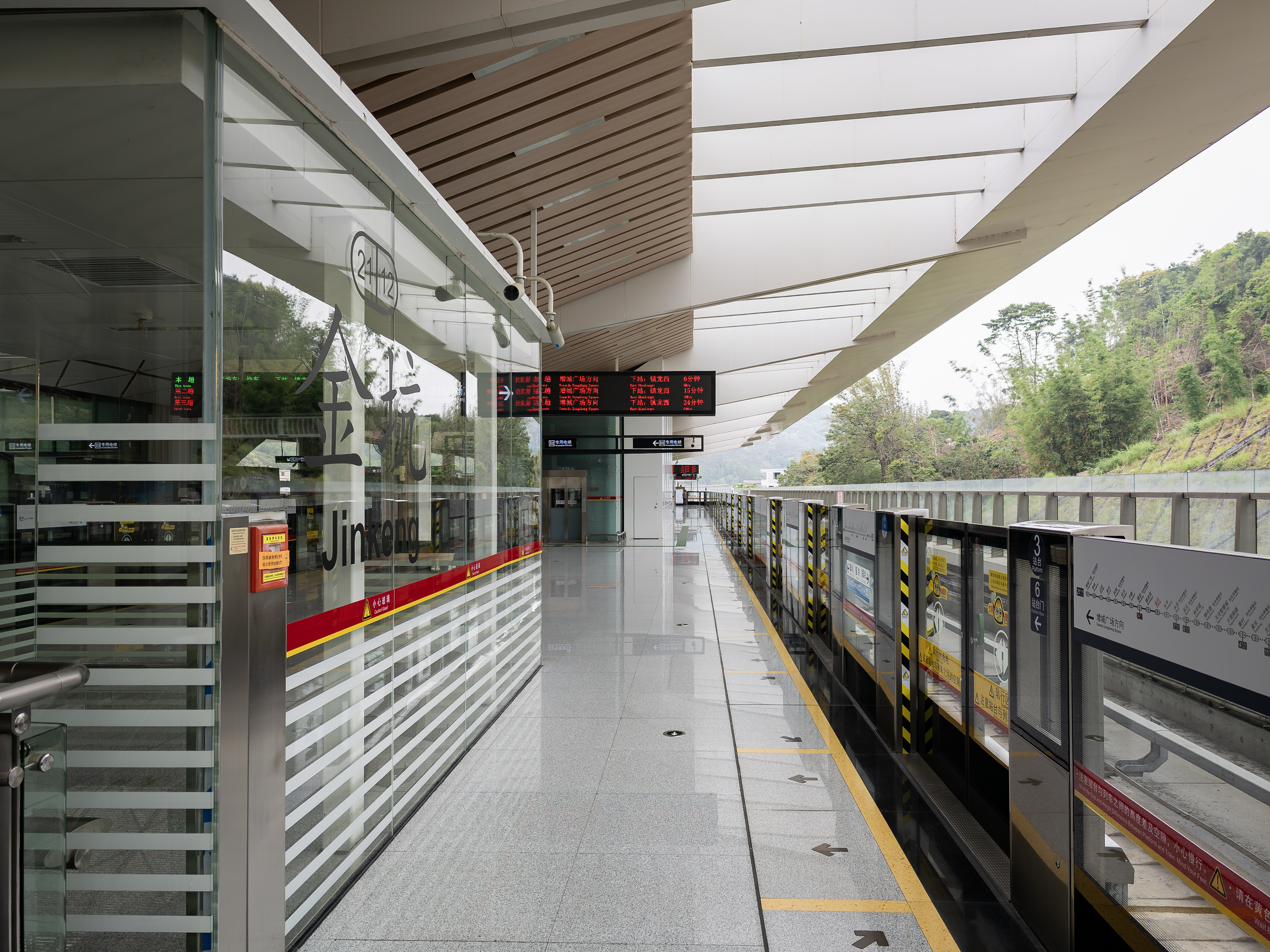
Platform 3

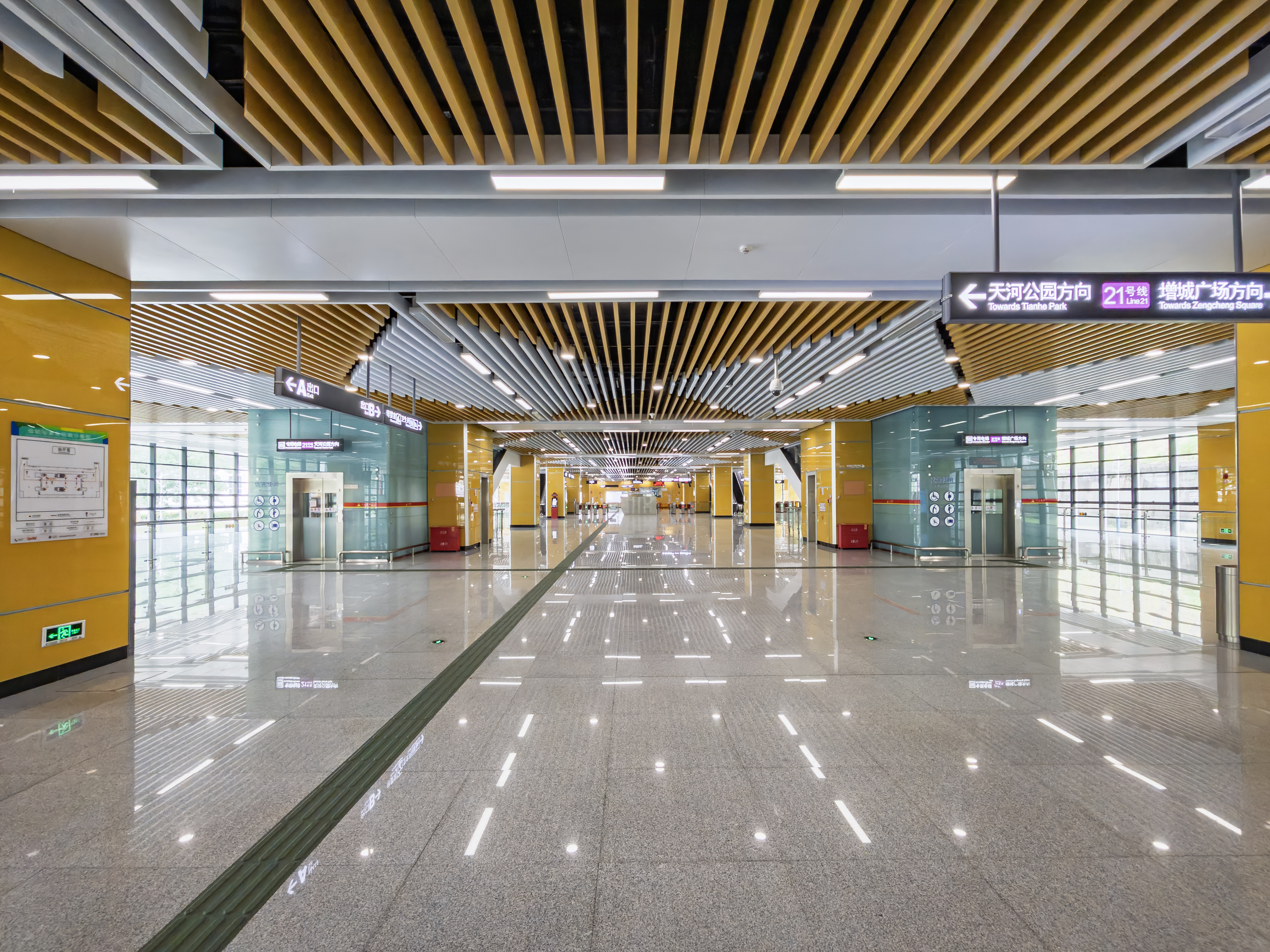
Concourse

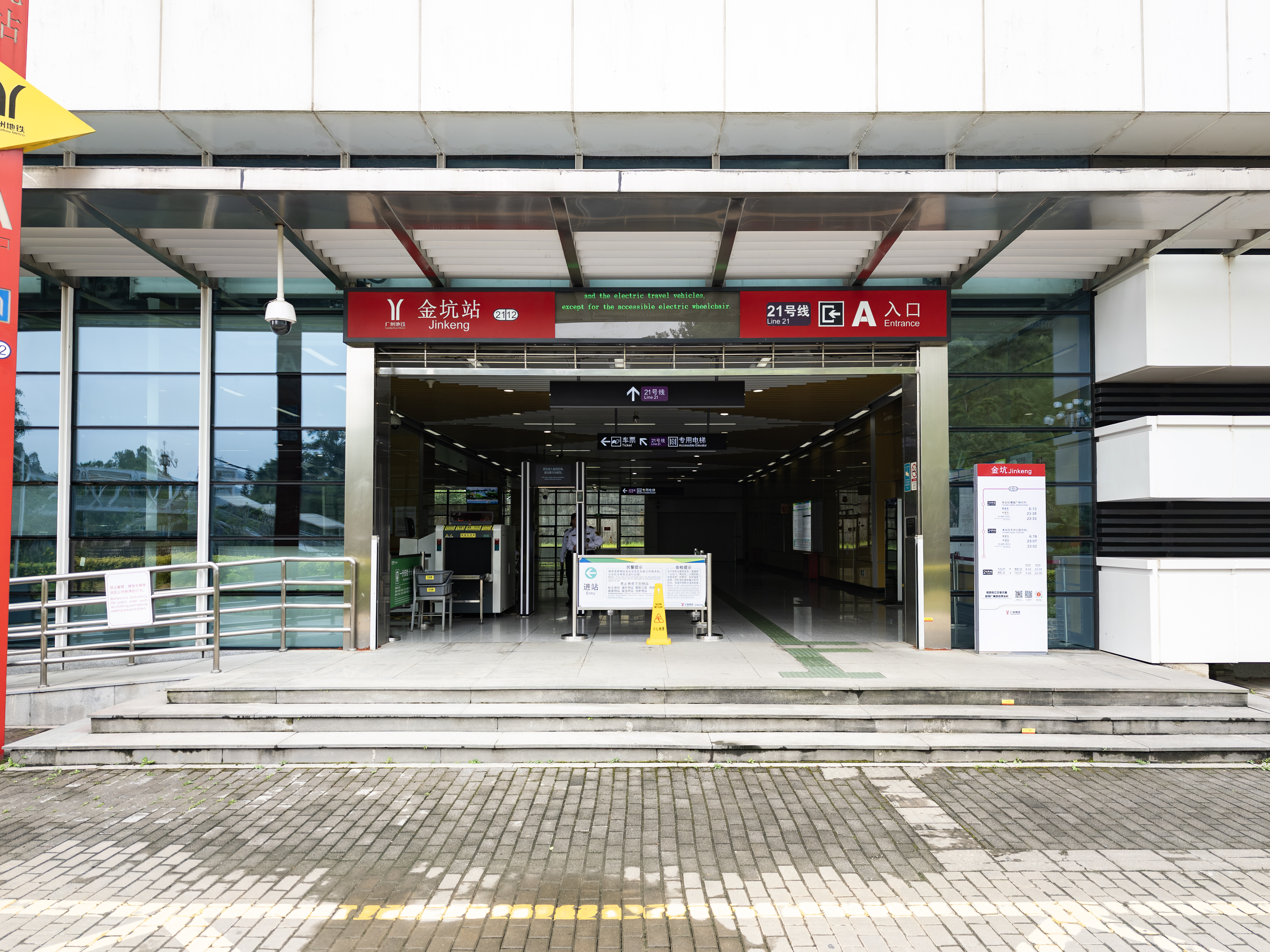
Exit A

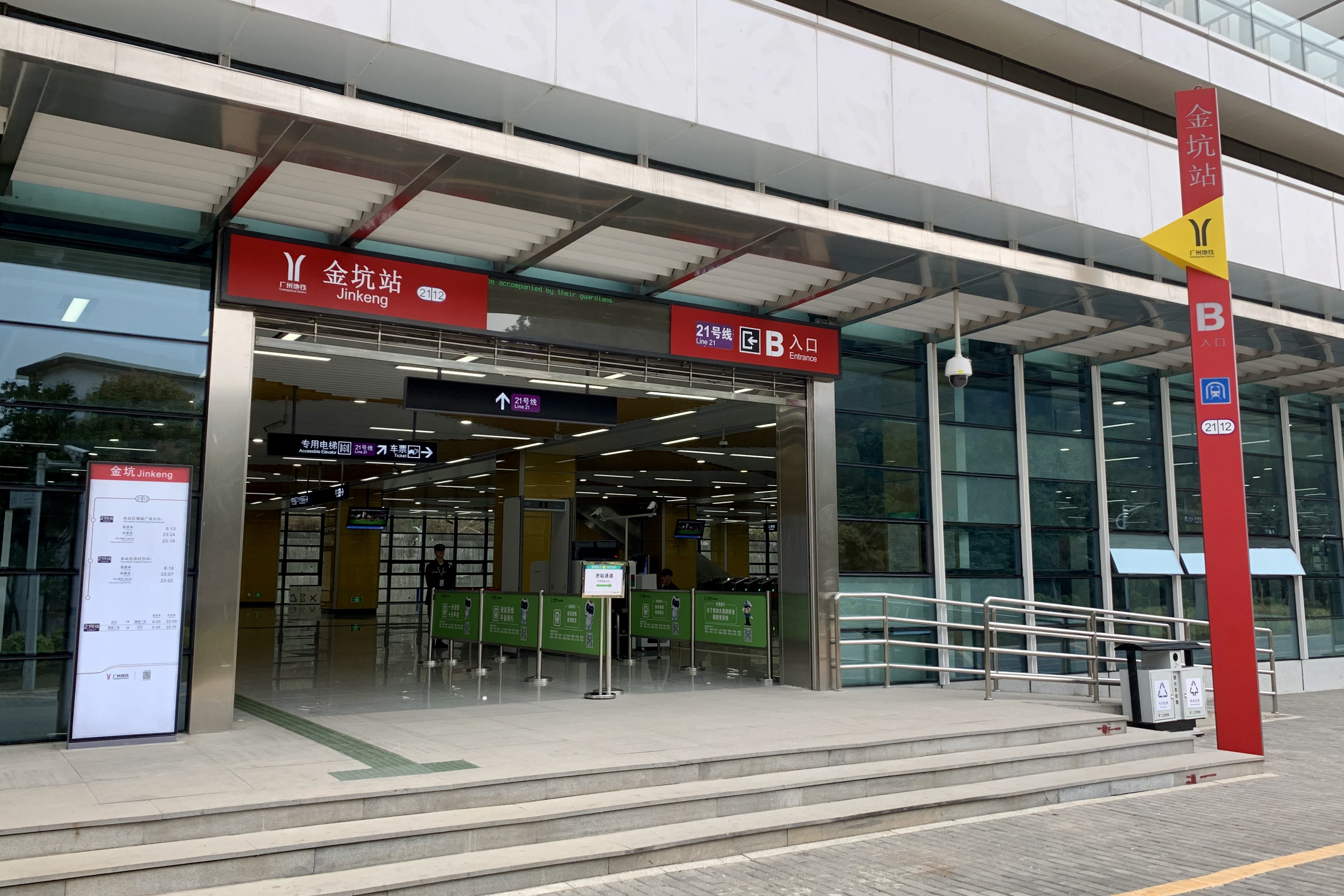
Exit B

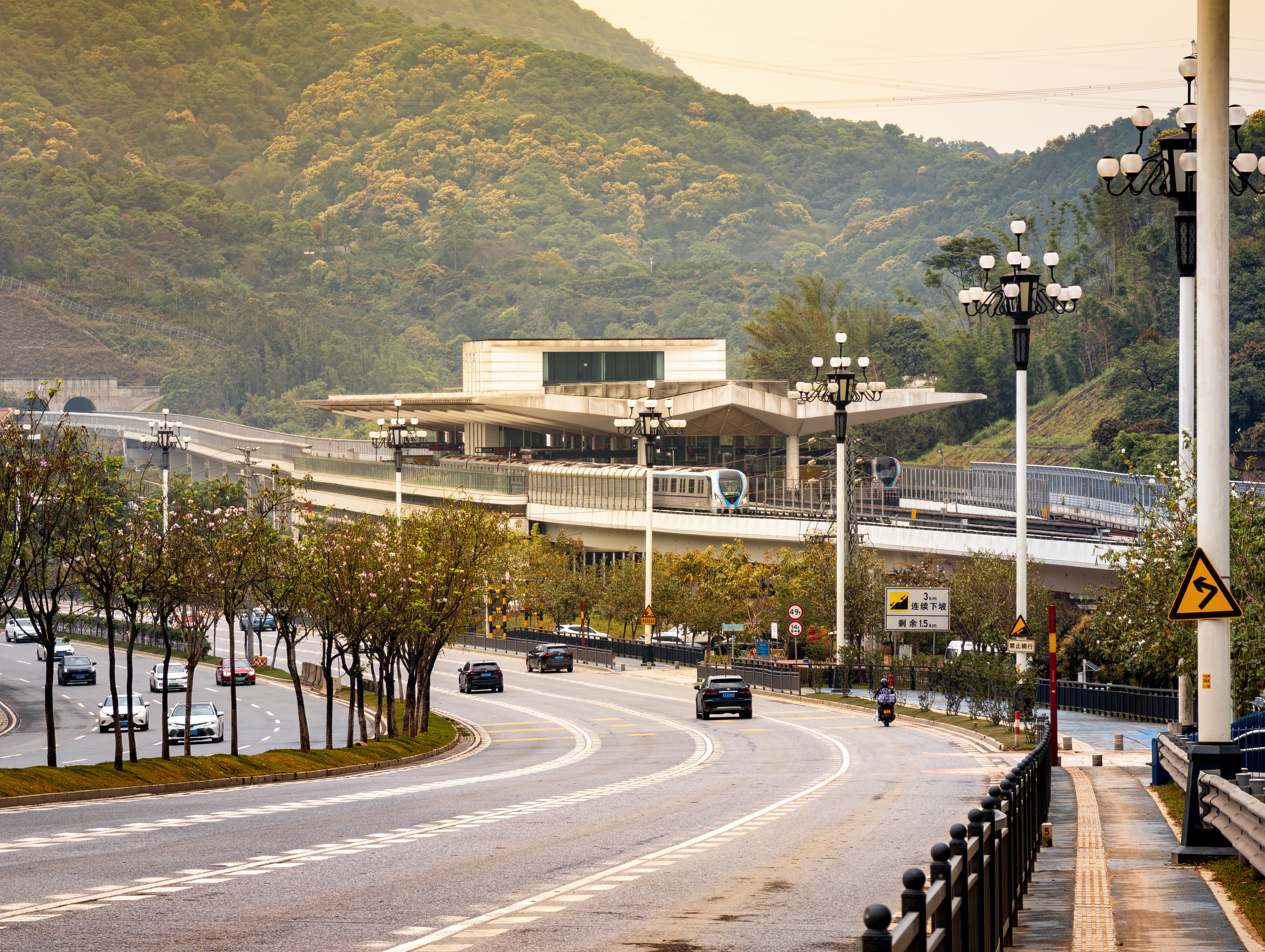
Exterior
