= Changping station (Guangzhou Metro) =

Guangzhou Metro station

Changping 长平
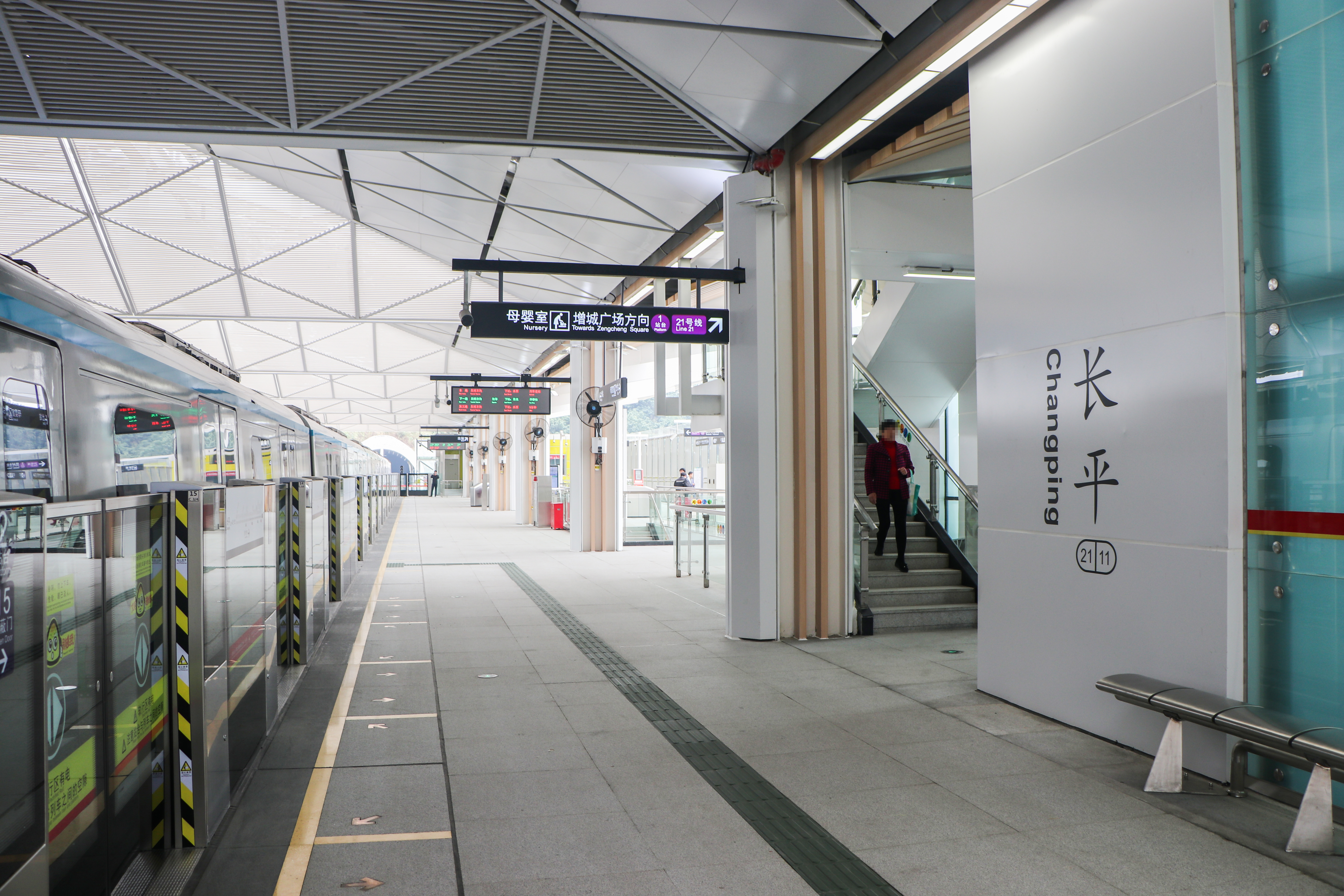
- Platform 2

Chinese name
- Simplified Chinese: 长平站
- Traditional Chinese: 长平站
Transcriptions
Standard Mandarin
- Hanyu Pinyin: Chángpíng Zhàn
Yue: Cantonese
- Jyutping: coeng^{1}ping^{4}zaam^{6}
- Hong Kong Romanization: Cheung Ping station

General information
- Location: Guangshan Highway; Yongshun Dadao, Huangpu District, Guangzhou, Guangdong; China
- Coordinates: 23.21247°N 113.48443°E
- Operated by: Guangzhou Metro Co. Ltd.
- Lines: Line 21; Huangpu Tram Line 1
- Platforms: 2 (2 side platforms)
- Tracks: 2

Construction
- Structure type: Elevated
- Accessible: Yes

Other information
- Station code: 2111; THP110

History
- Opened: 20 December 2019; 6 years ago

Services
Preceding station	Guangzhou Metro	Following station
Shuixi towards Tianhe Park	Line 21	Jinkeng towards Zengcheng Square
Qiangdong towards Xinfeng Lu	Huangpu Tram Line 1	Guangzhou Experimental School Affiliated to BNU towards Xiangxue
Location

Changping Station (Chinese: 长平站; pinyin: Chángpíng Zhàn) is an elevated station on Line 21 of the Guangzhou Metro that became operational on 20 December 2019.

== Station layout ==
F4	-	Passageway between Platforms 1 & 2
F3; Platforms	North Lobby	Customer Service, Vending machines
F3; Platforms	Side platform, doors will open on the right
F3; Platforms	Platform 2	21 towards Tianhe Park (Shuixi)
F3; Platforms	Platform 1	21 towards Zengcheng Square (Jinkeng)
F3; Platforms	Side platform, doors will open on the right
F3; Platforms	South Lobby	Customer Service, Vending machines
F2; Buffer Area	Buffer Area	Buffer area of South Lobby, Station equipment
F2; Buffer Area	Pedestrian Overpass	Passageway between North & South Lobbies
G Concourse	-	Exits, Station equipment, Shops, Toilet

== Exits ==
Exit number	Exit location
Exit A	Yongshun Dadao
Exit B1	Yongshun Dadao THP1
Exit B2	Yongshun Dadao
Exit C1	Yongshun Dadao
Exit C2	Yongshun Dadao
Exit C3	Yongshun Dadao
Exit D	Yongshun Dadao

== Gallery ==
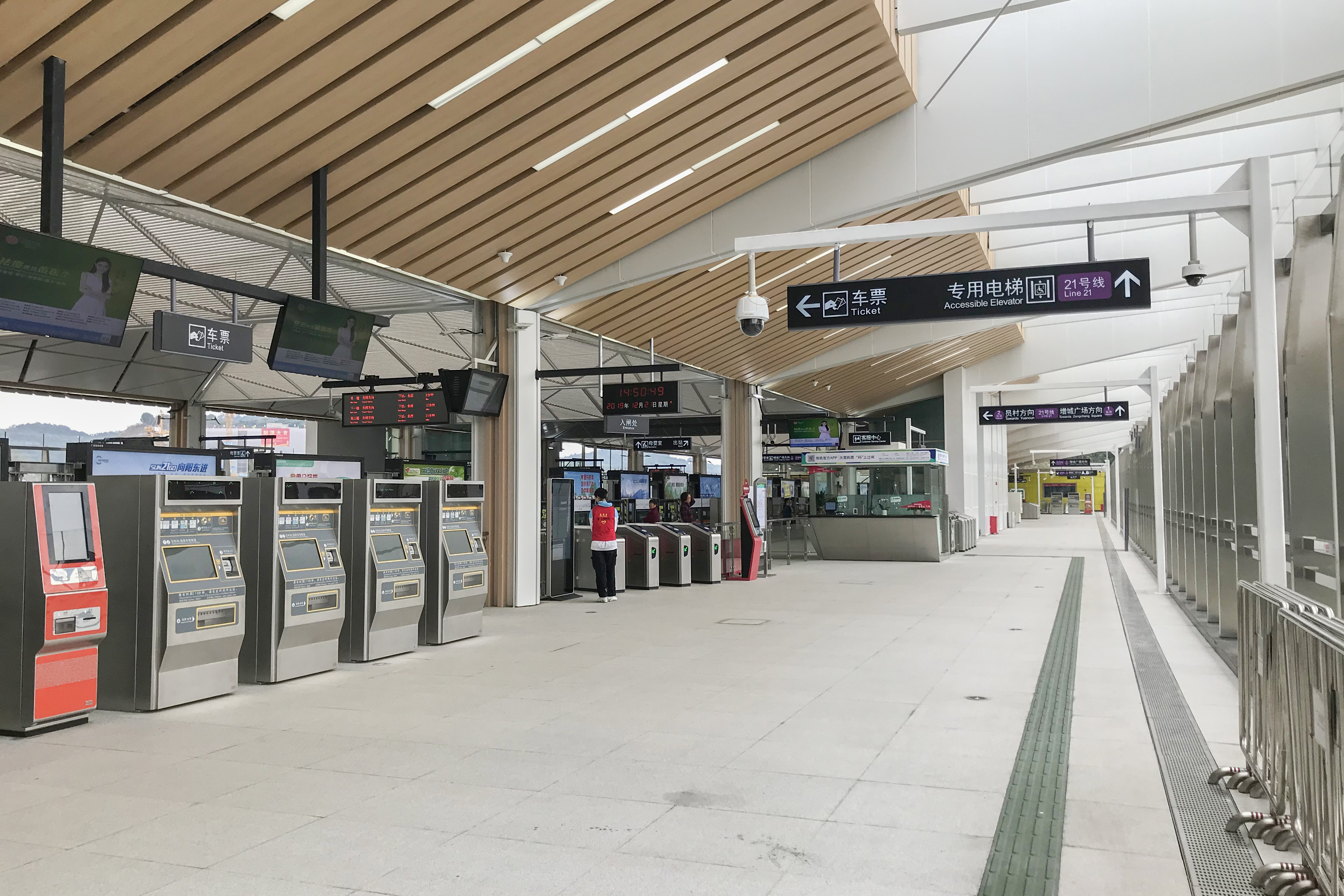
West Concourse

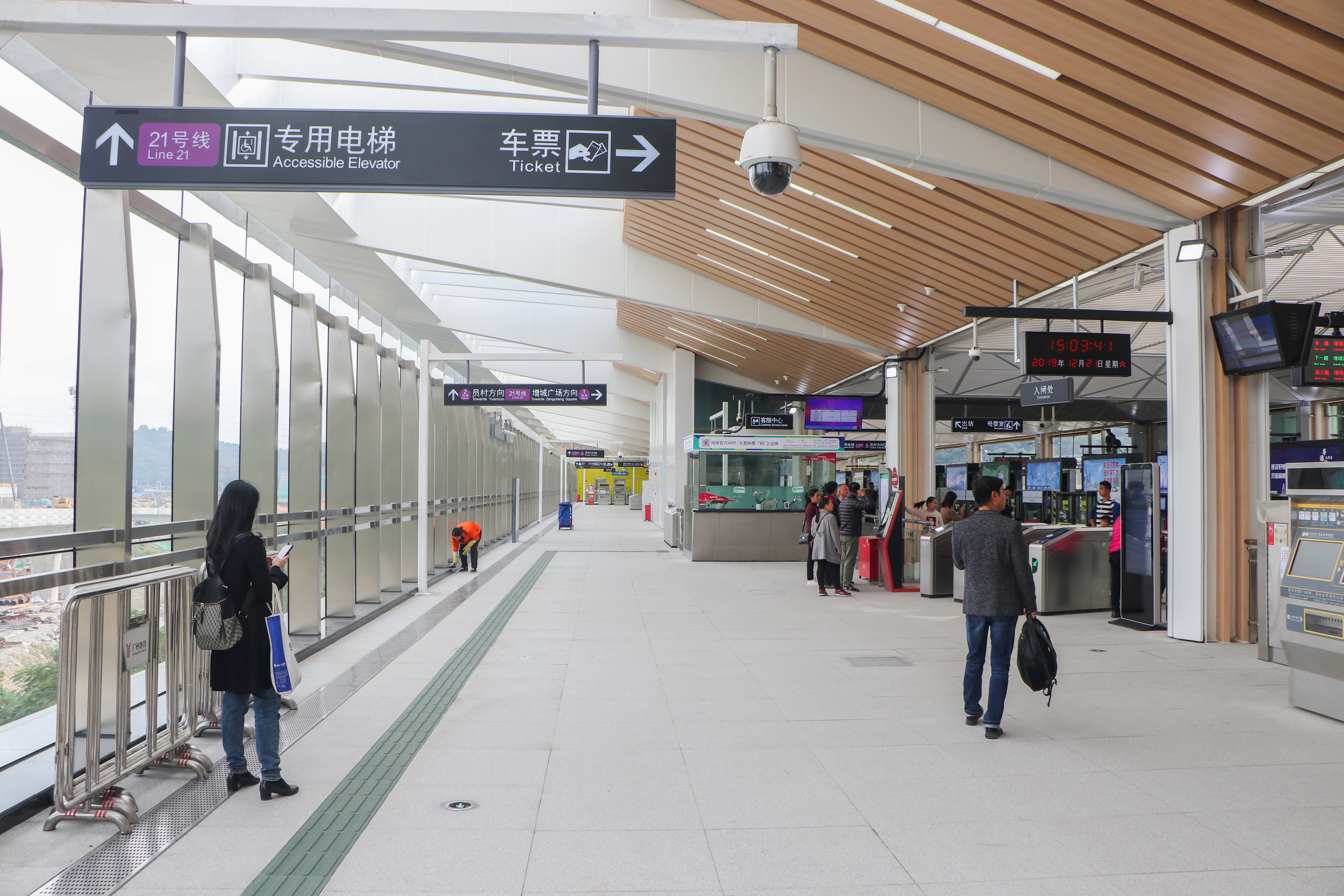
East Concourse

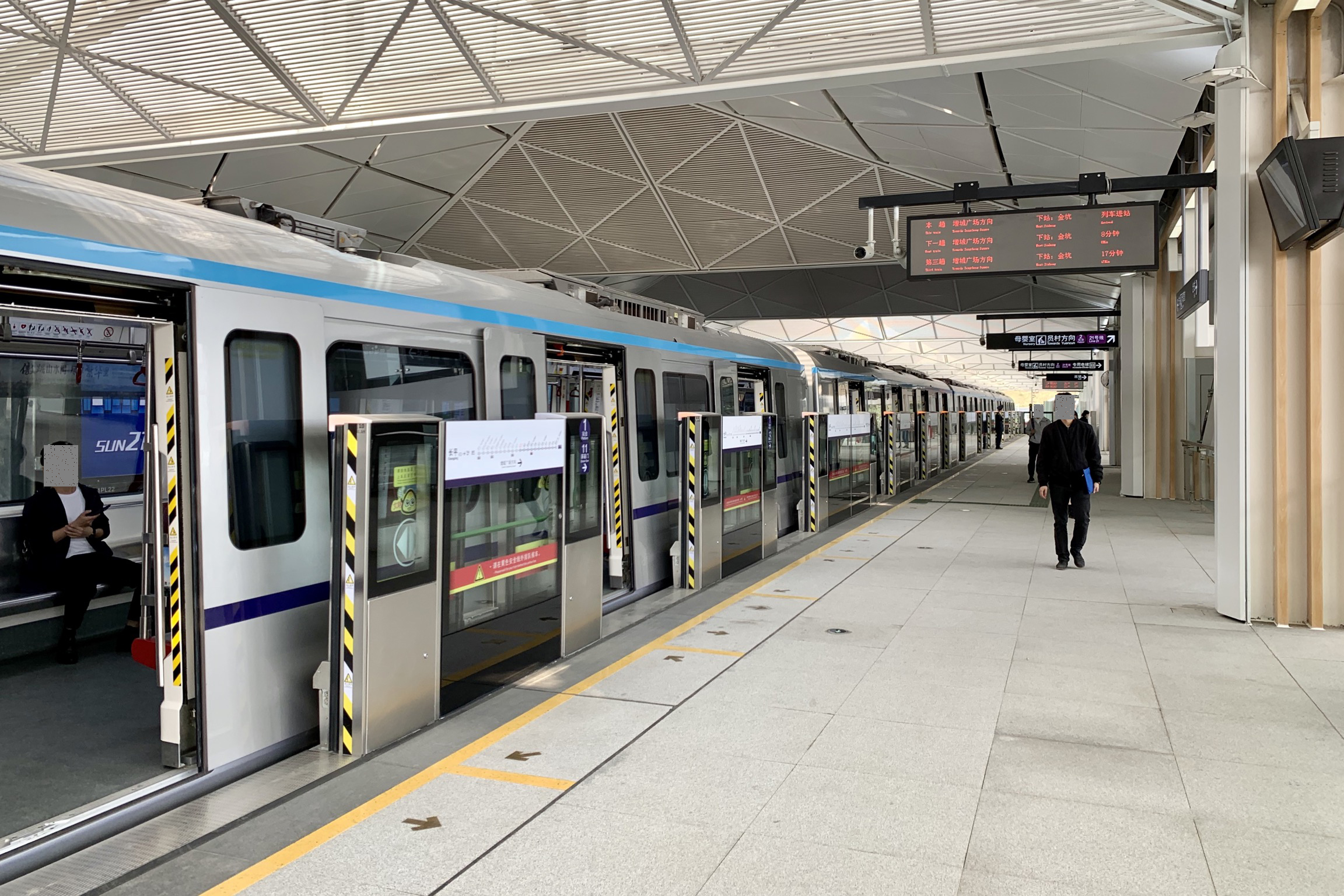
Platform 1

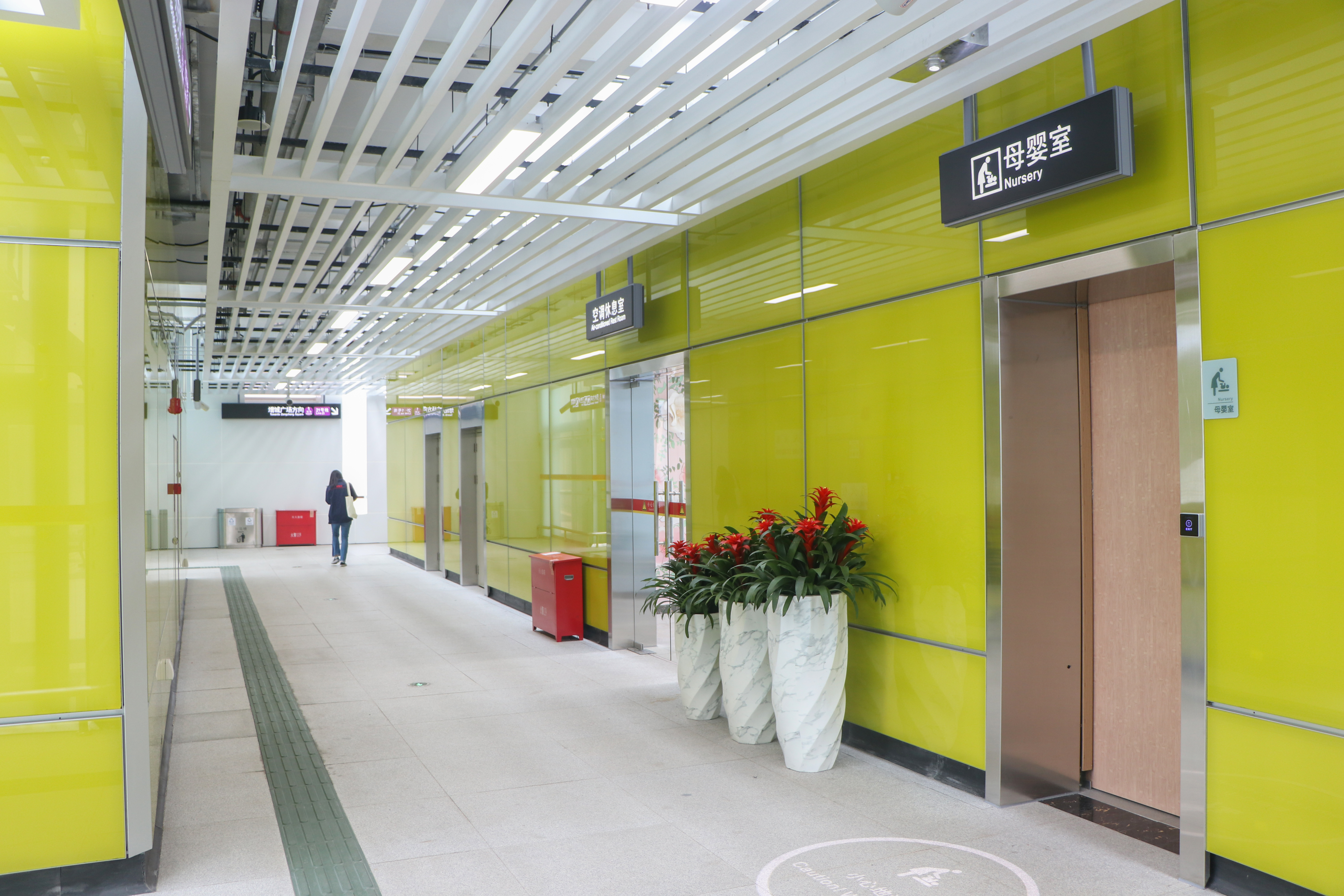
F4 passageway between platforms 1 and 2

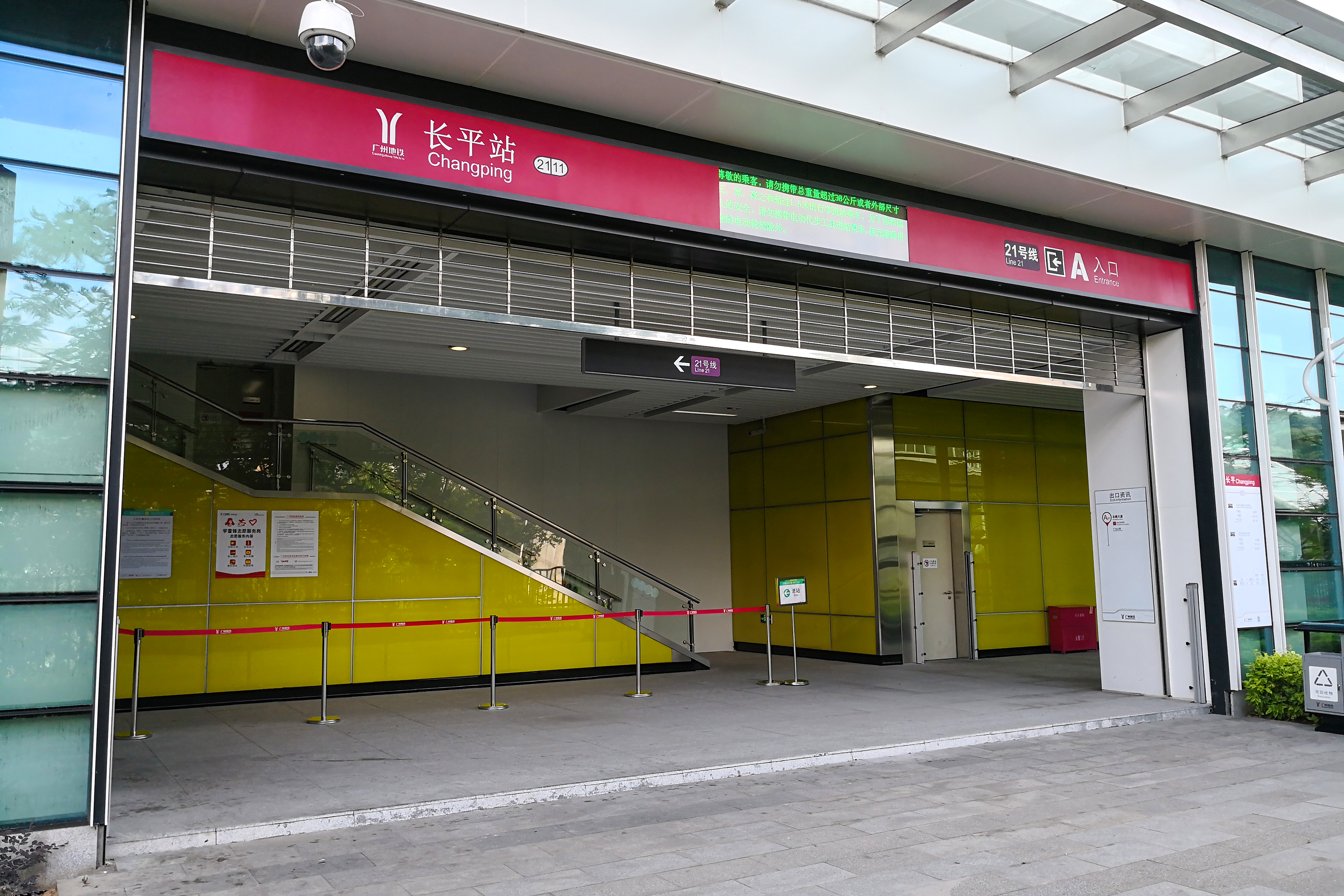
Exit A

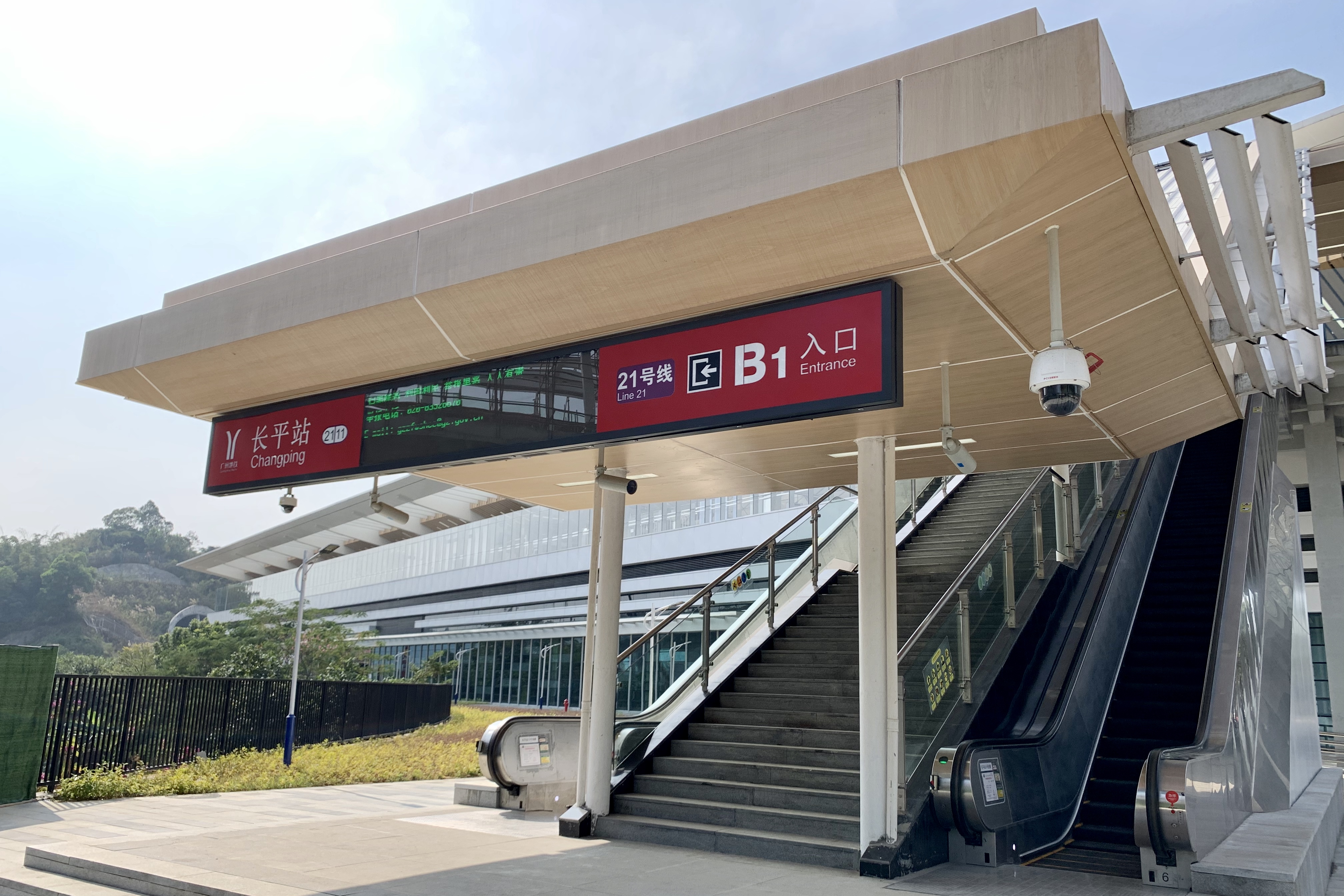
Exit B1

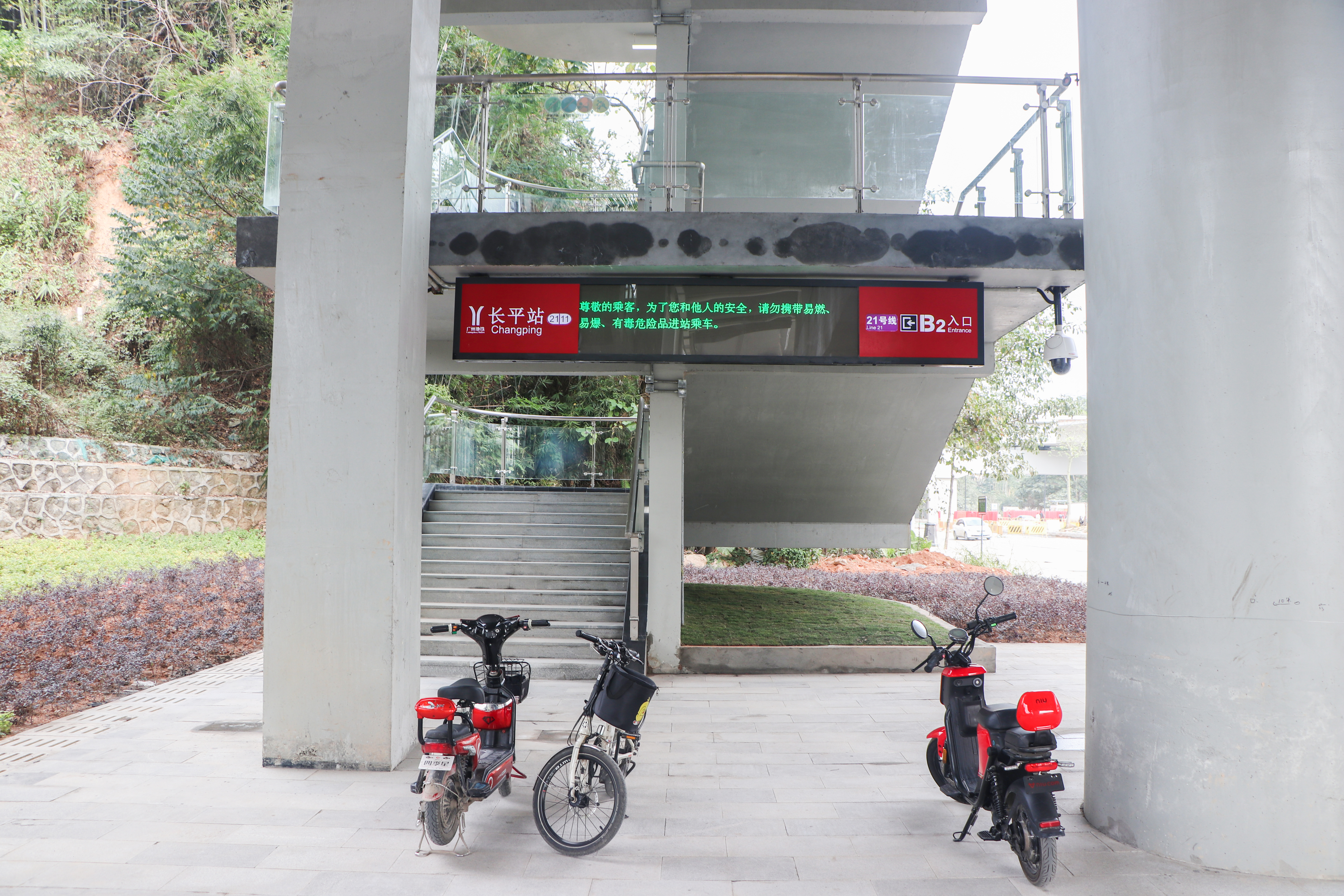
Exit B2

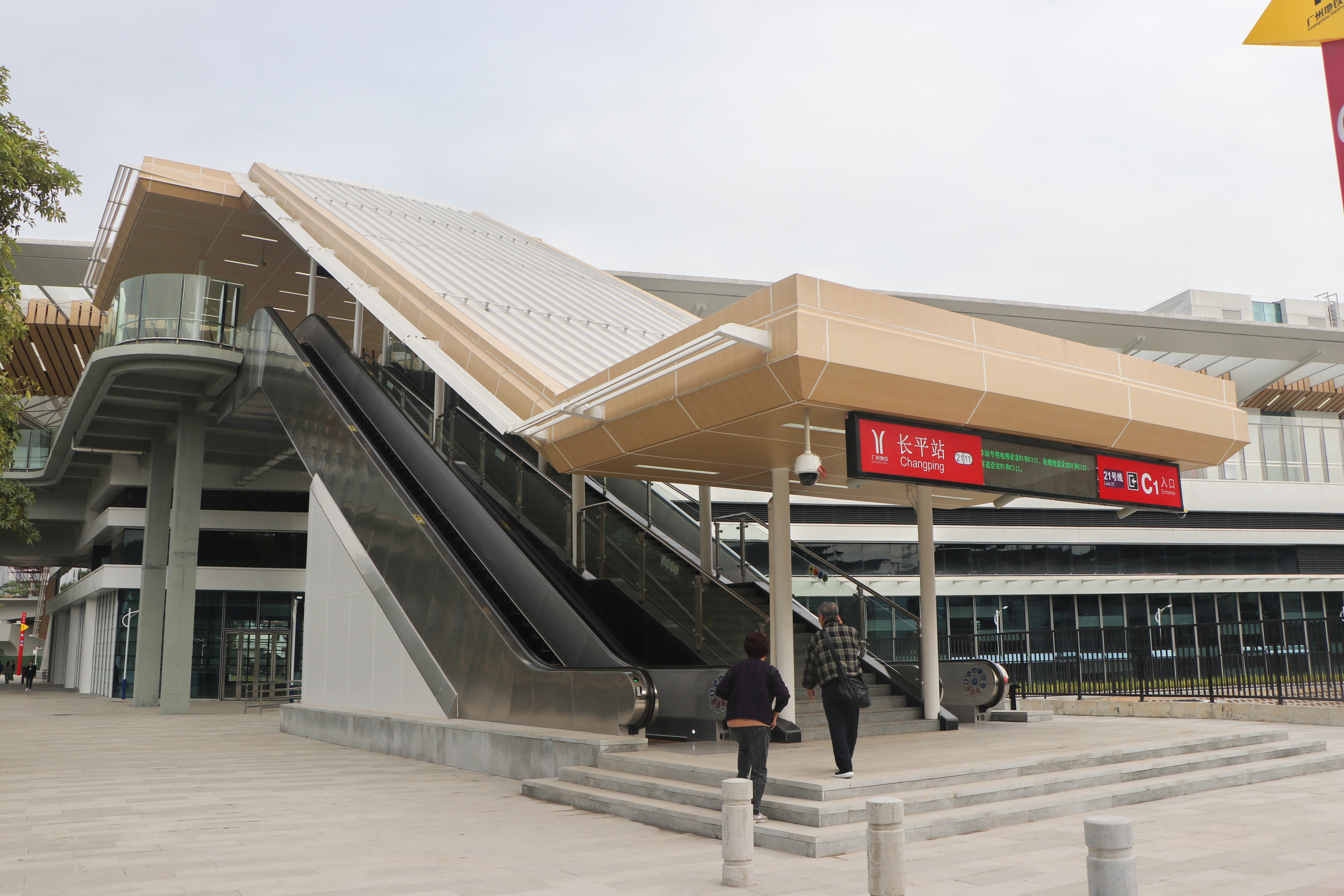
Exit C1

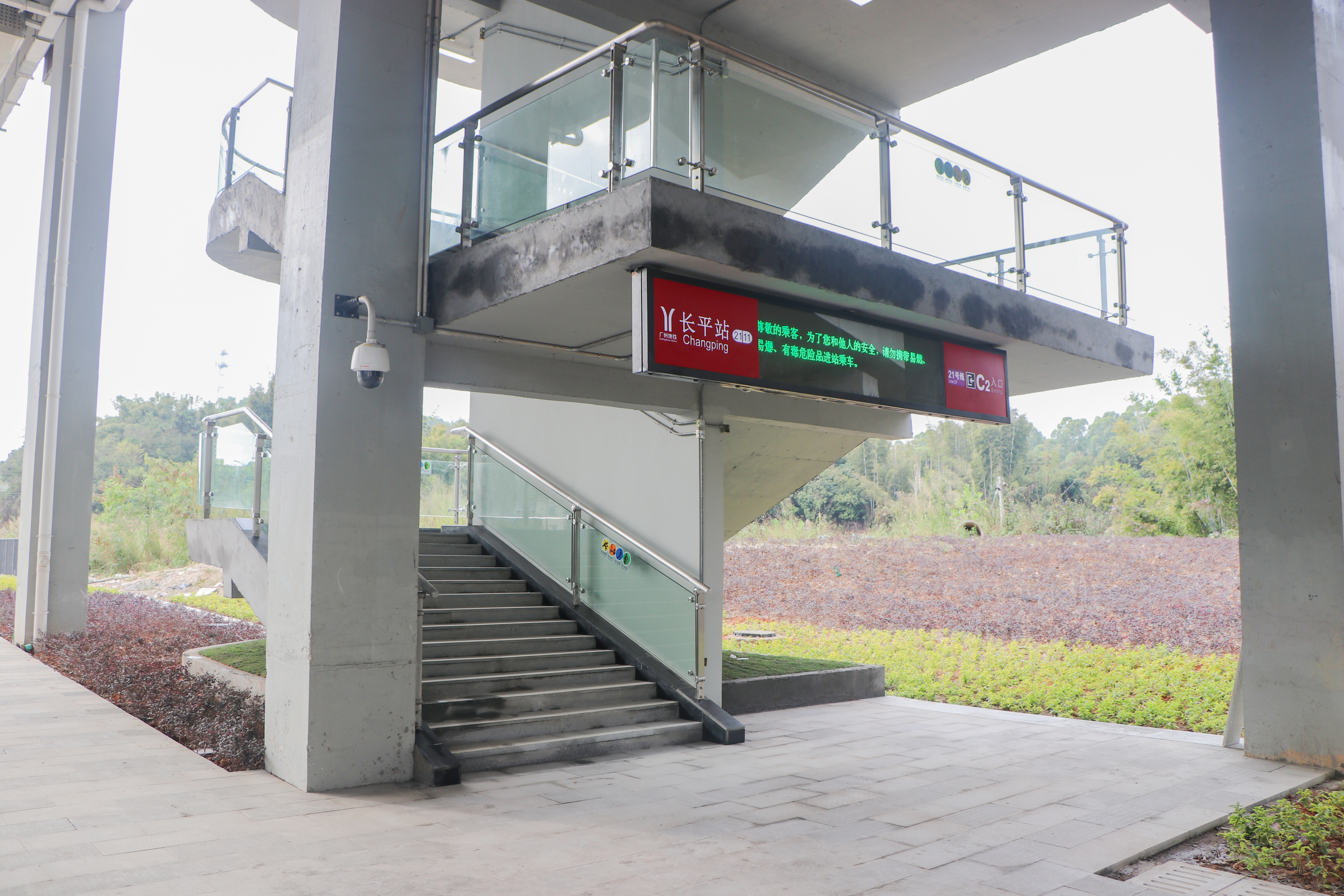
Exit C2

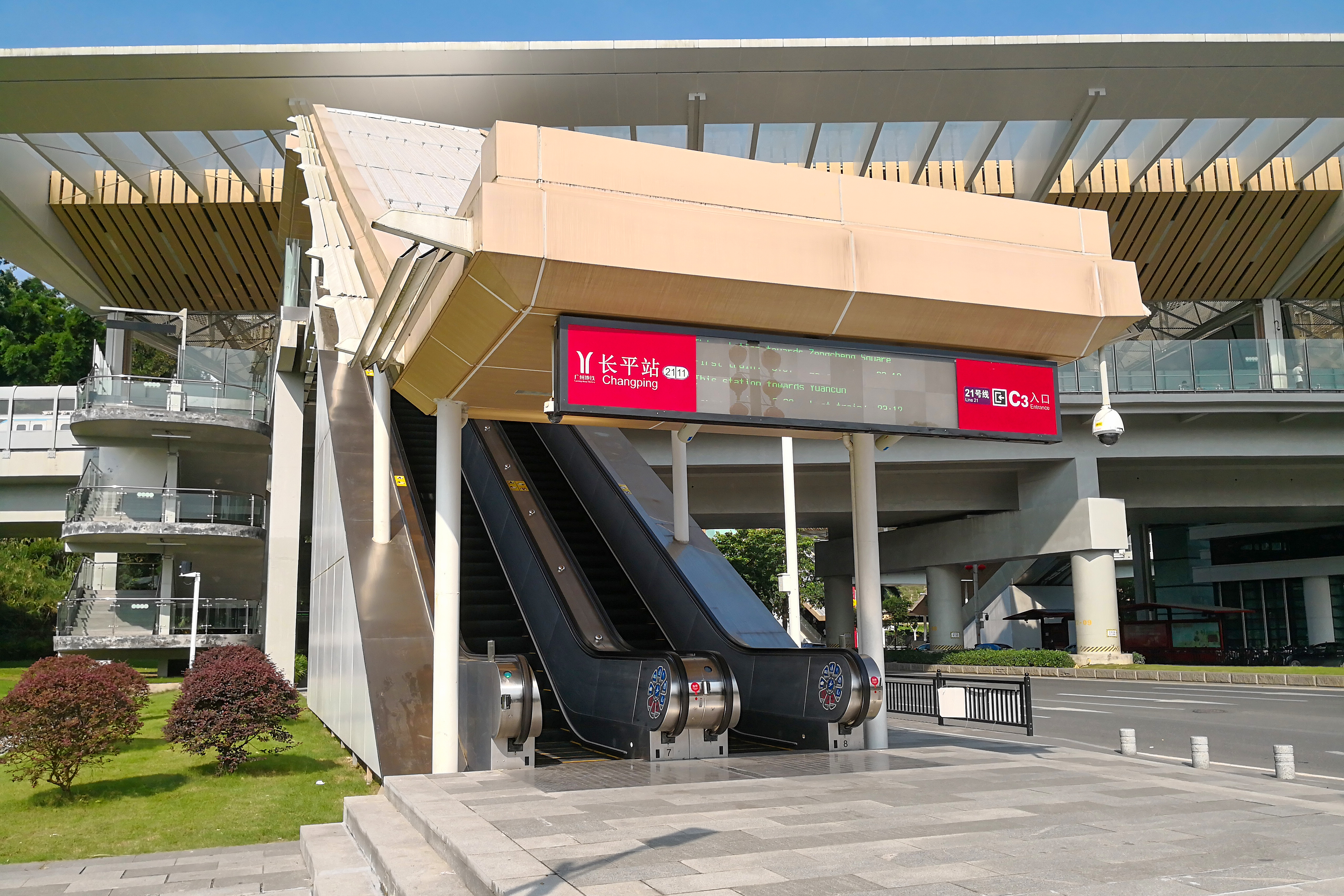
Exit C3

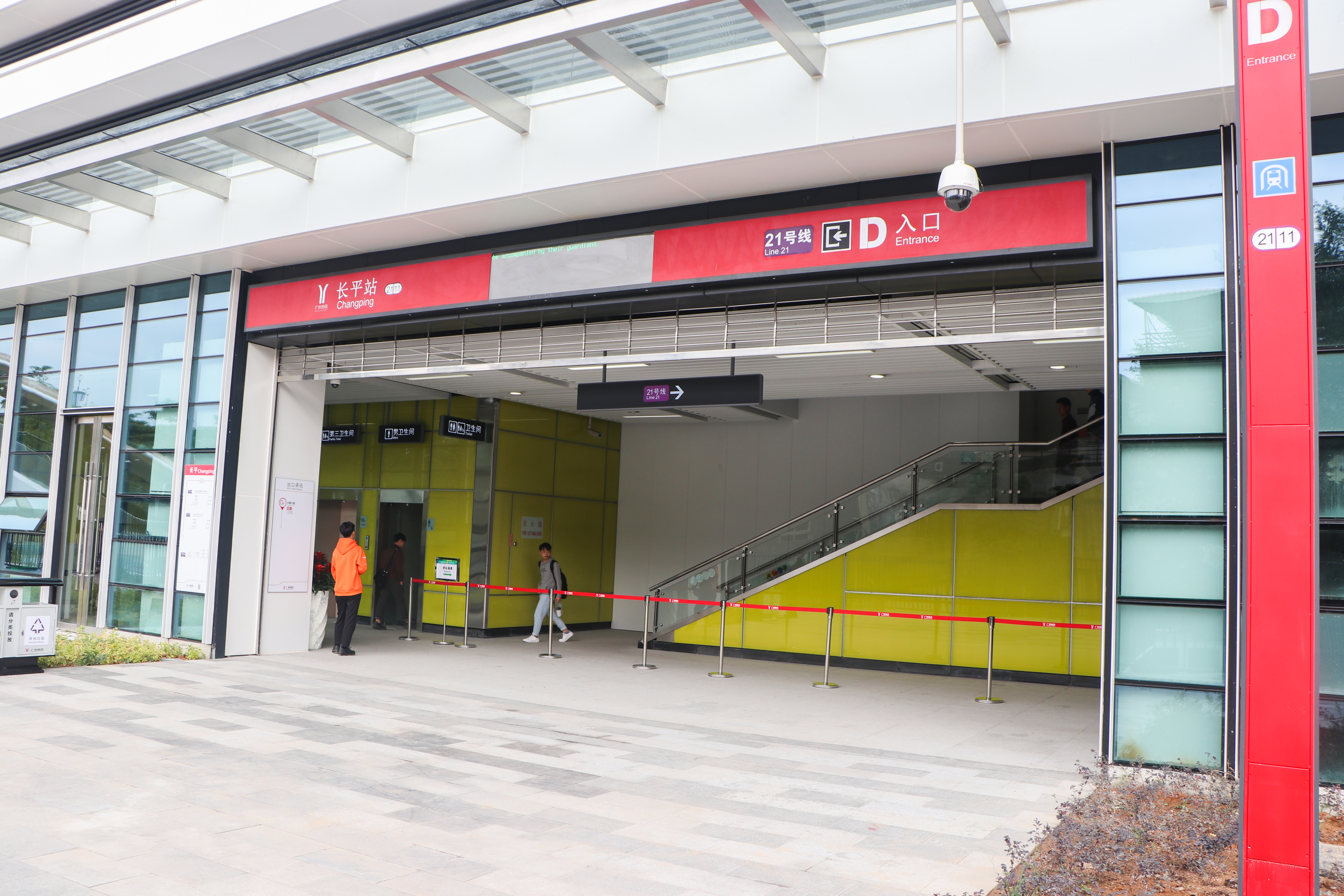
Exit D
