= Shuixi station =

Guangzhou Metro interchange station

Shuixi 水西
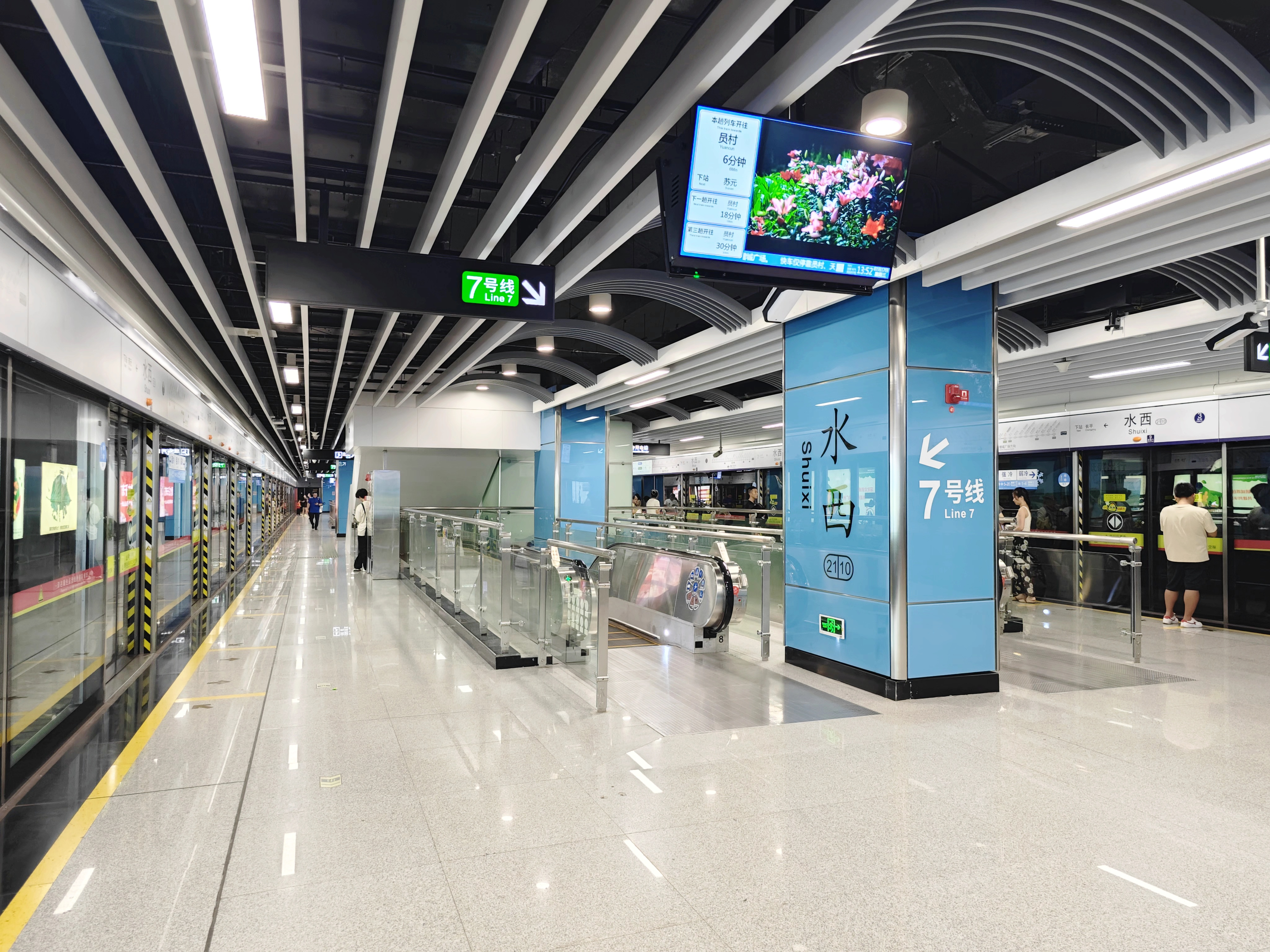
- Line 21 platform

Chinese name
- Simplified Chinese: 水西站
- Traditional Chinese: 水西站
Transcriptions
Standard Mandarin
- Hanyu Pinyin: Shuìxī Zhàn
Yue: Cantonese
- Yale Romanization: Séuisāi Jaahm
- Jyutping: Seoi^{2}sai^{1} Zaam^{6}

General information
- Location: Shuixi Road, Xiangxue No. 3 Road, Huangpu District, Guangzhou, Guangdong; China
- Coordinates: 23°11′26″N 113°28′15″E
- Operator: Guangzhou Metro Co. Ltd.
- Lines: Line 7; Line 21; Huangpu Tram Line 1
- Platforms: 4 (2 island platforms)
- Tracks: 6
- Connections: THP1 (Shuixi Subway)

Construction
- Structure type: Underground
- Accessible: Yes

Other information
- Station code: 719 2110 THP106

History
- Opened: Line 21: 20 December 2019 (6 years ago); Huangpu Tram Line 1: 1 July 2020 (6 years ago); Line 7: 28 December 2023 (2 years ago)

Services
Preceding station	Guangzhou Metro	Following station
Luogang towards Meidi Dadao	Line 7	Yanshan Terminus
Suyuan towards Tianhe Park	Line 21	Changping towards Zengcheng Square
Suyuan towards Tianhe Park	Line 21 Express	Zhenlong towards Zengcheng Square
Juntai Lu towards Xinfeng Lu	Huangpu Tram Line 1	Convention Center towards Xiangxue
Location

Shuixi station (Chinese: 水西站; pinyin: Shuìxī Zhàn; Cantonese Yale: Séuisāi Jaahm) is an interchange station between Line 7 and Line 21 of the Guangzhou Metro. Line 21 opened on 20 December 2019, whilst Line 7 opened on 28 December 2023.

== Station layout ==
The Line 21 station has an underground island platform, along with 2 bypass tracks next to the stopping tracks. The Line 7 station has a separate island platform underneath Line 21. There are 6 exits, lettered A, B, C, D, E and F. Exits A, C and F are accessible. Exits A, B and D are located on Shuixi Road, and exits C, E and F are located on Luosuizhi Street. Exit A provides interchange with Huangpu Tram Line 1 (THP1).

G	Street level	Exits A-F
L1; Concourse	Lobby	Ticket Machines, Customer Service, Shops, Police Station, Security Facilities
L2; Platforms	Bypass track	21 passing loop (not in passenger use)
L2; Platforms	Platform 4	21 towards Tianhe Park (Suyuan)
L2; Platforms	Island platform, doors will open on the left (Toilets, Nursery)
L2; Platforms	Platform 3	21 towards Zengcheng Square (Changping / express: Zhenlong)
L2; Platforms	Bypass track	21 passing loop (not in passenger use)
Mezzanine	Transfer level	Transfer between Lines 7 and 21
L3; Platforms	Platform 2	7 towards Meidi Dadao (Luogang)
L3; Platforms	Island platform, doors will open on the left (Toilets, Nursery)
L3; Platforms	Platform 1	7 towards Yanshan (terminus)

=== Entrances/exits ===
The station has 6 points of entry/exit. Exits C and F are equipped with elevators.

When the station initially opened, Exits A and B were set up on the south side of Shuixi Road, while Exit D on the north side of Shuixi Road was opened on 31 May 2022. After the Line 7 station opened, Exits C, E and F were added to this station, of which Exits C and F were additionally equipped with elevators to improve accessibility.

- A: Shuixi Road
- B: Shuixi Road, THP1
- C: Luosui Straight Street, THP1
- D: Shuixi Road
- E: Luosui Straight Street
- F: Luosui Straight Street
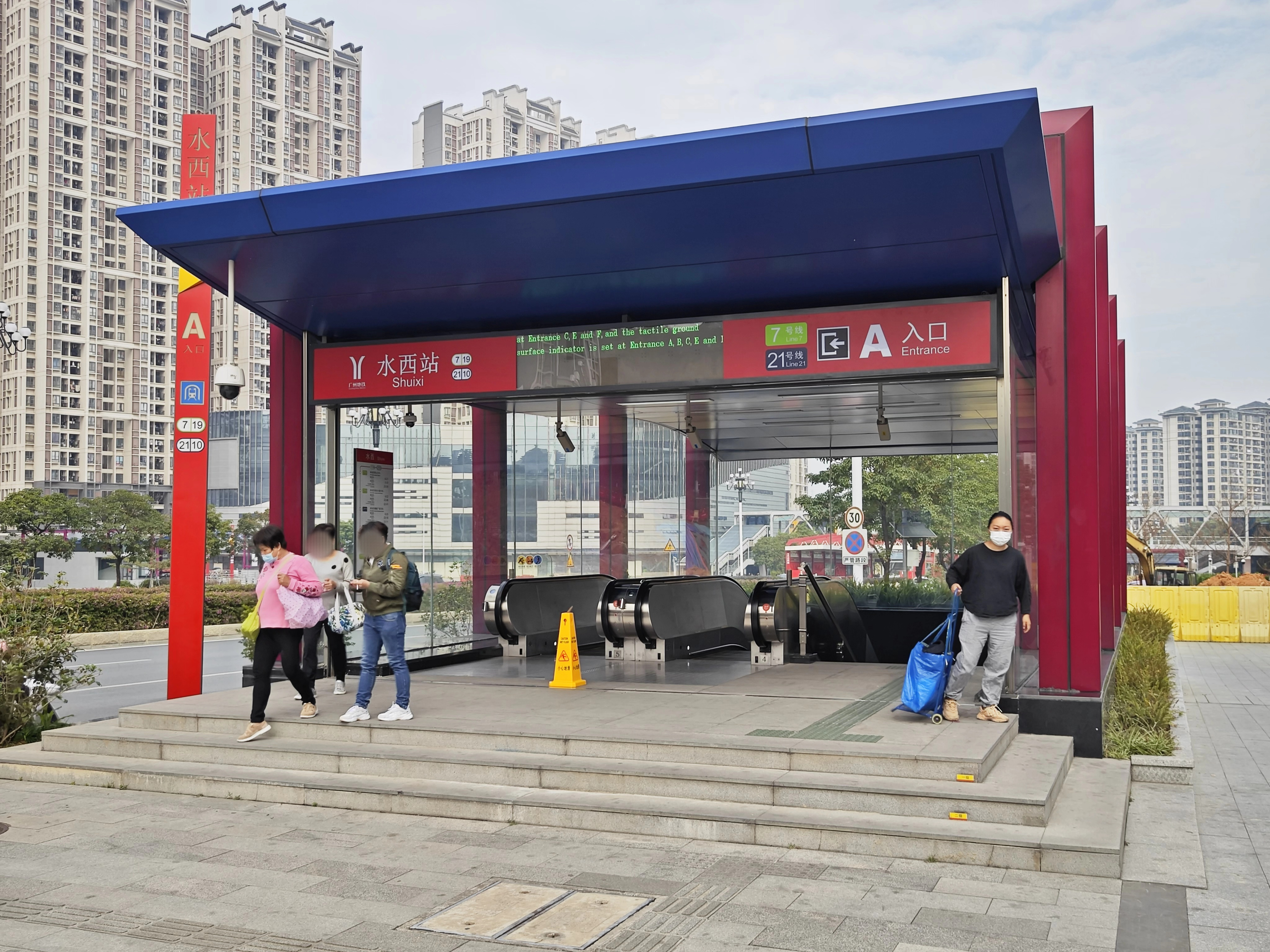
Entrance A

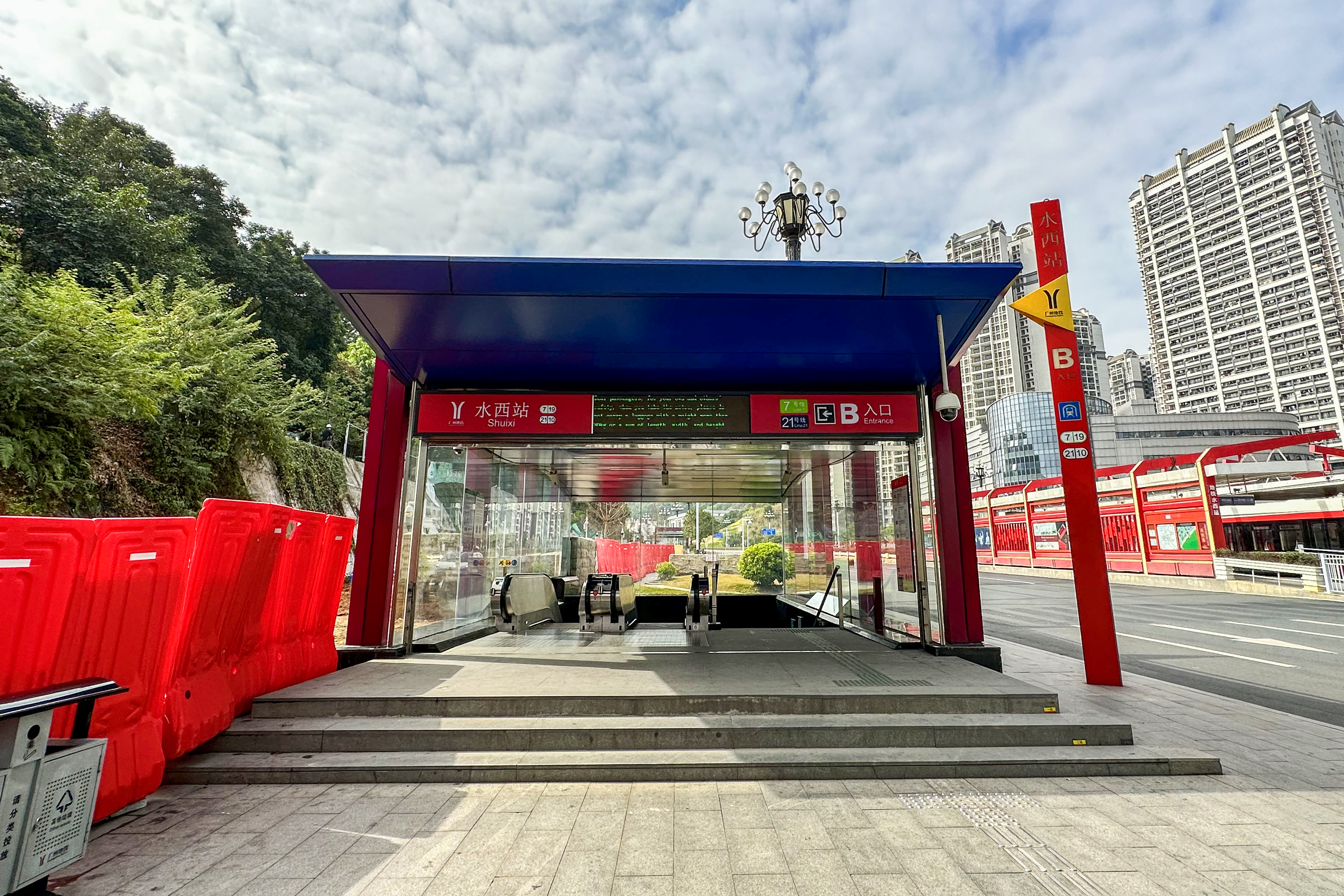
Entrance B

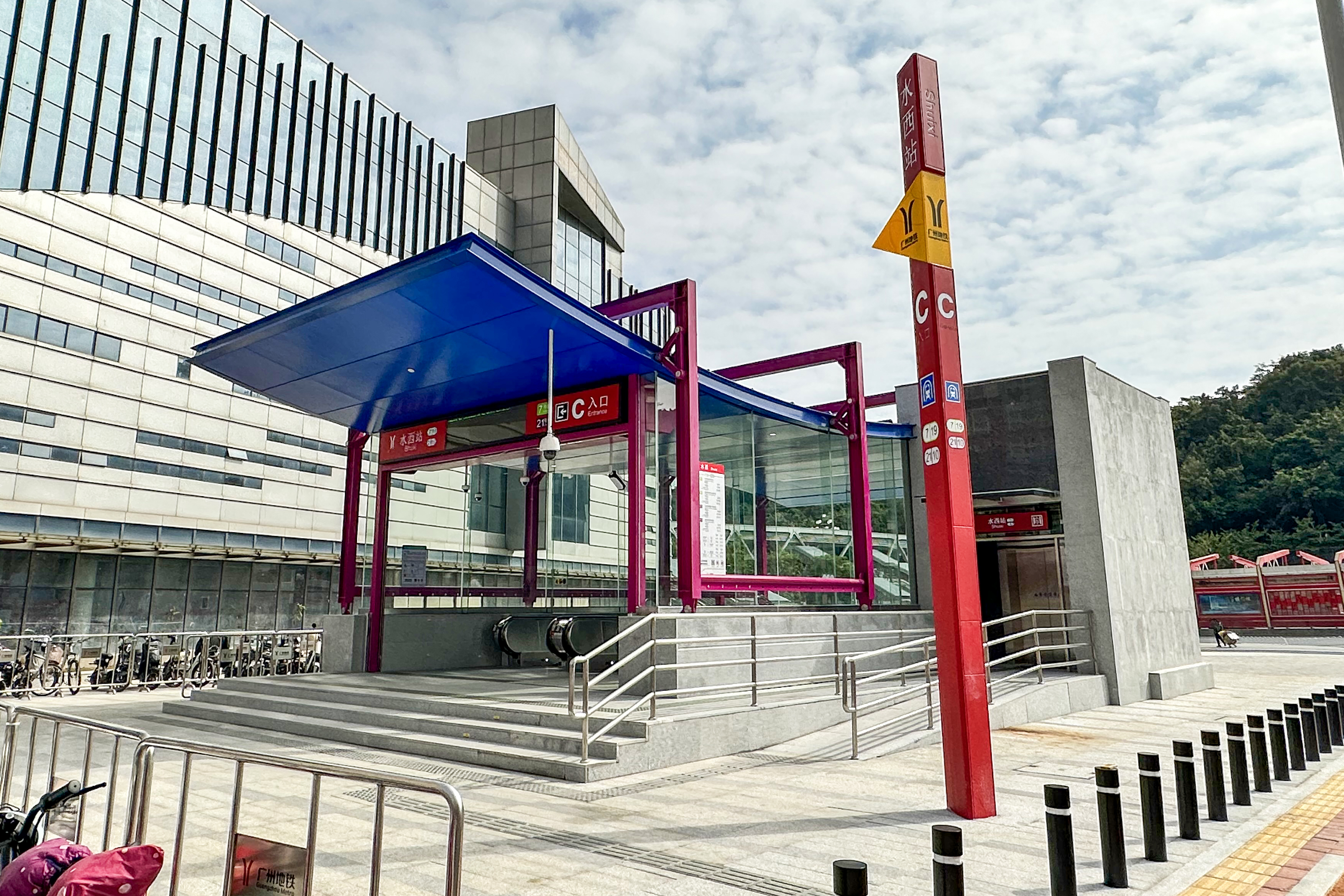
Entrance C

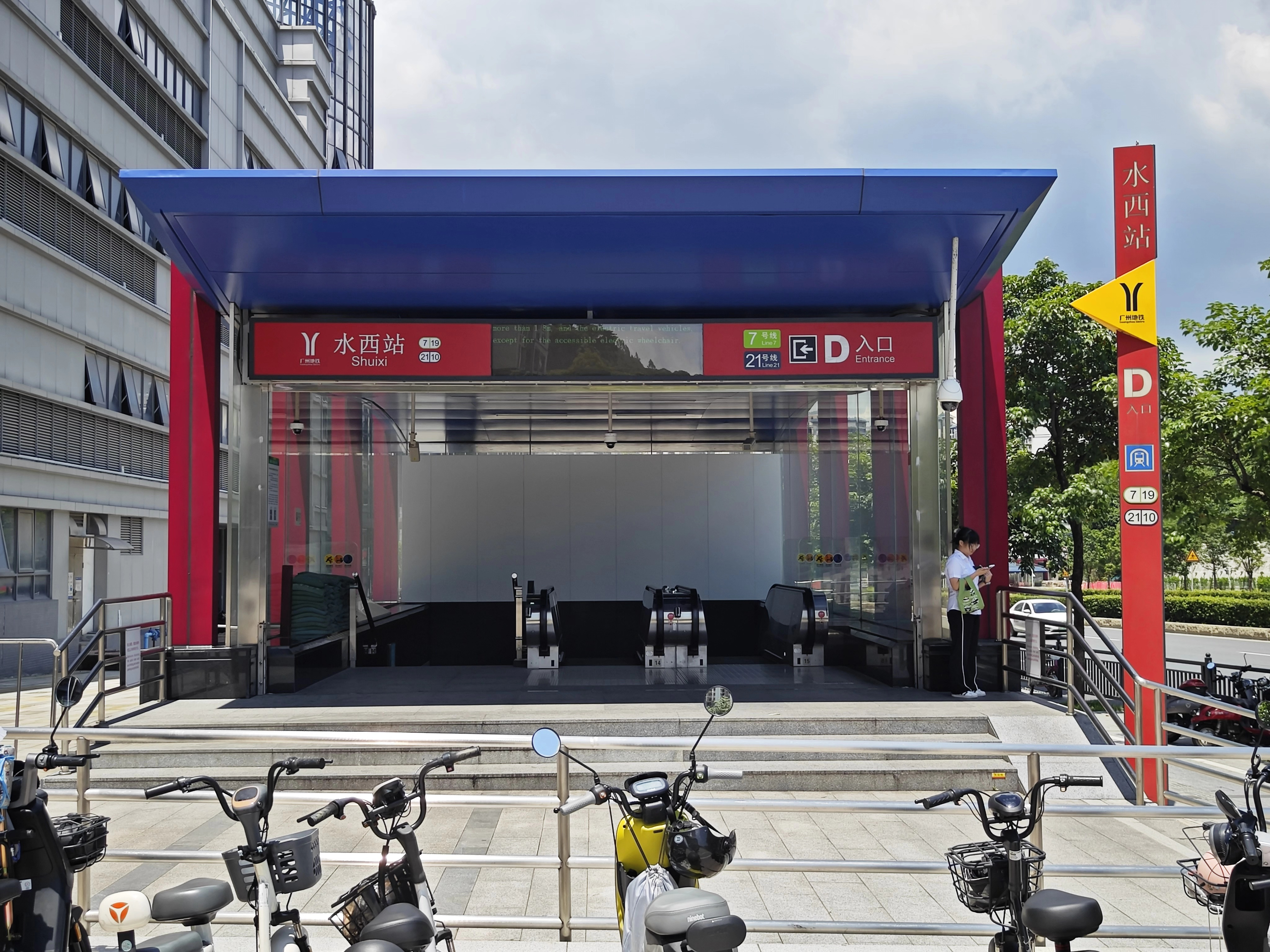
Entrance D

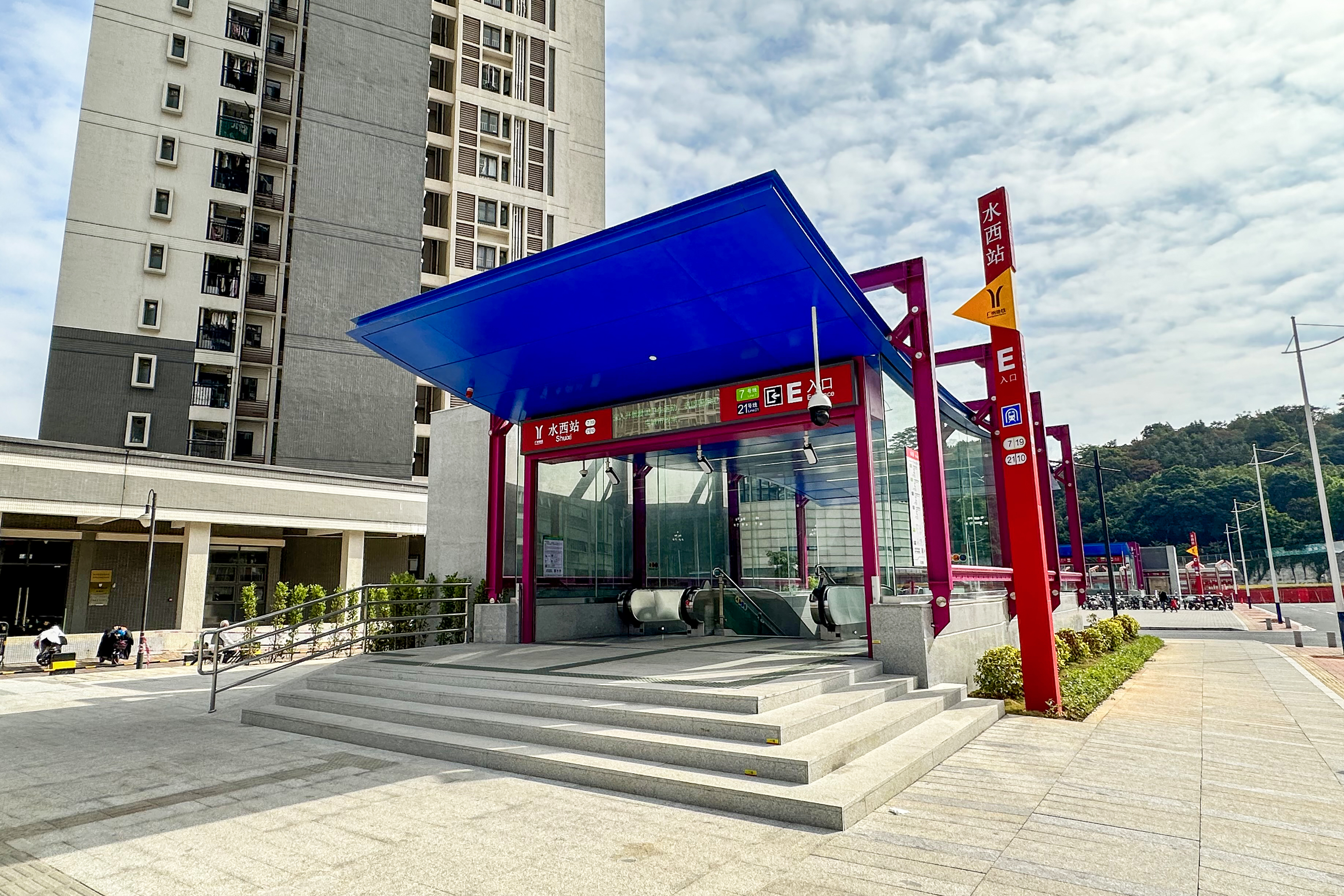
Entrance E

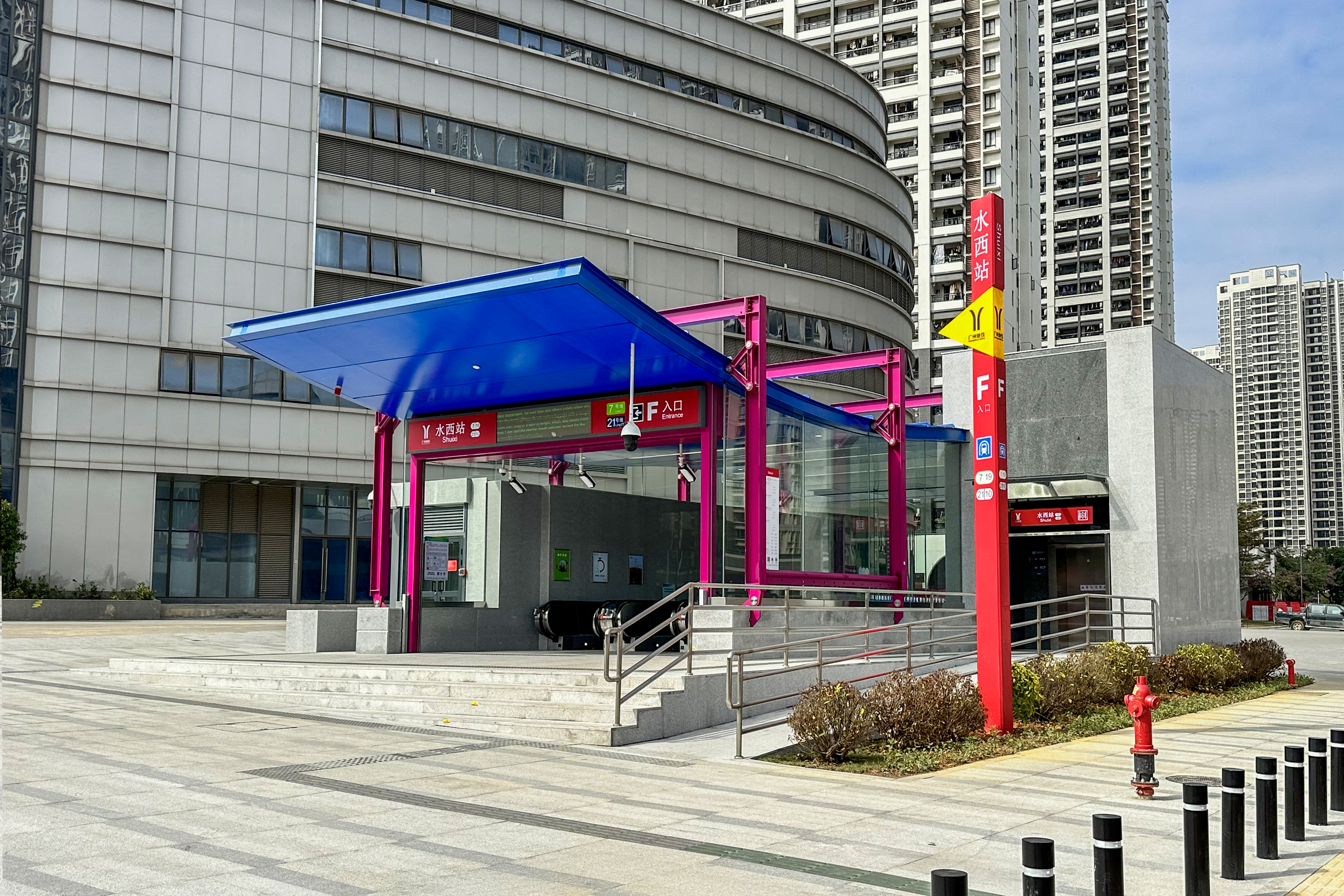
Entrance F

== Gallery ==
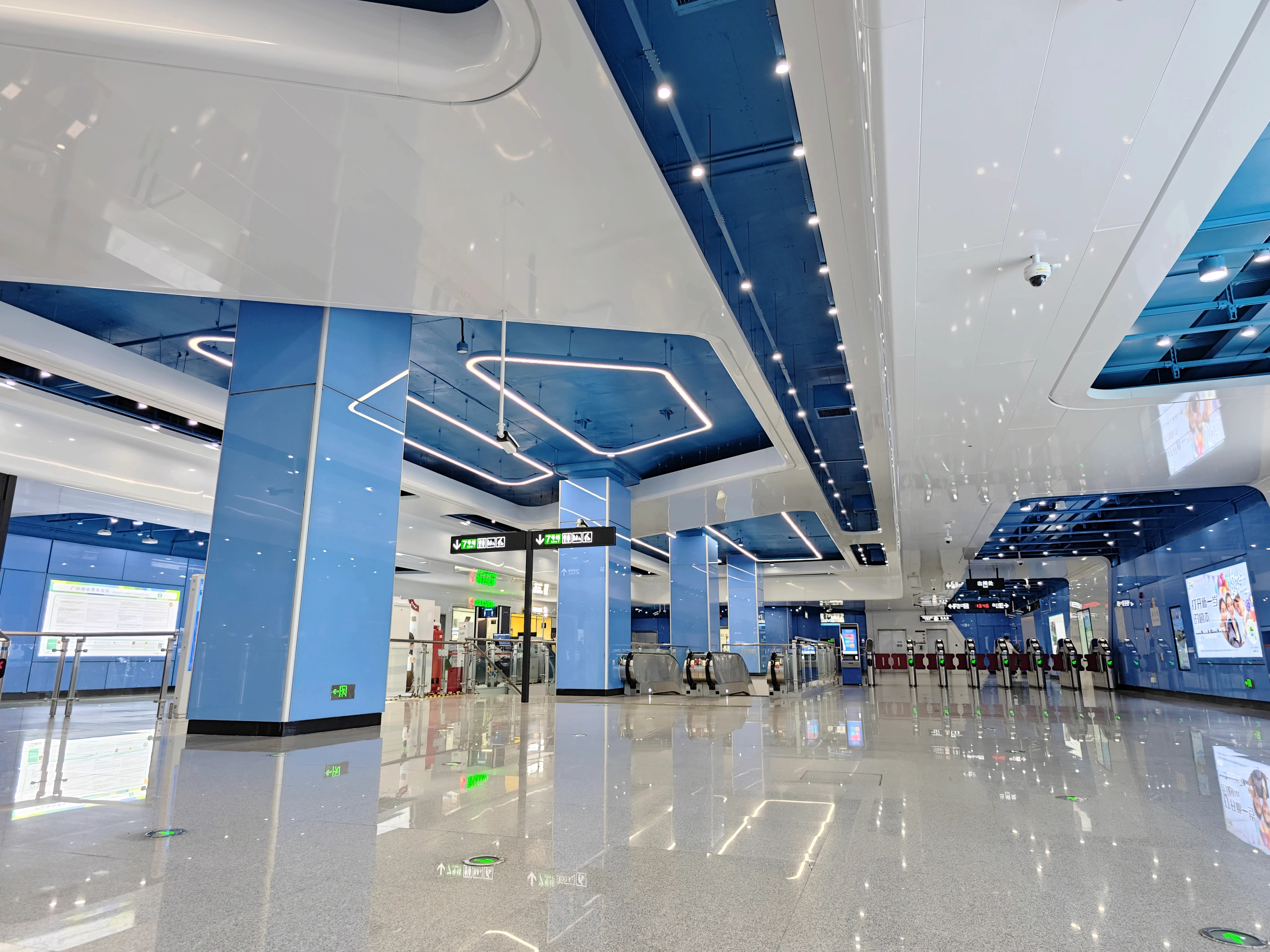
Line 7 concourse

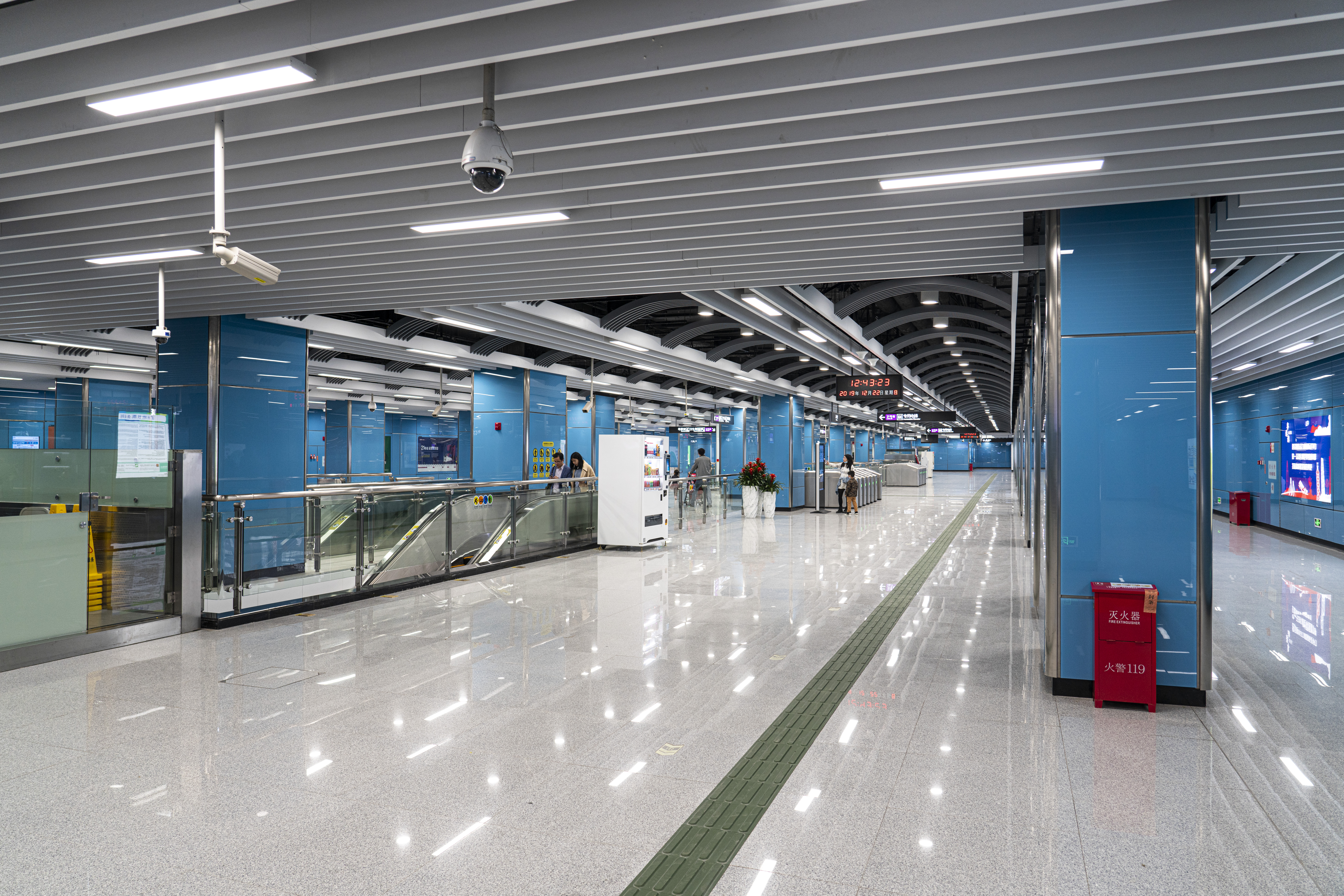
Line 21 concourse

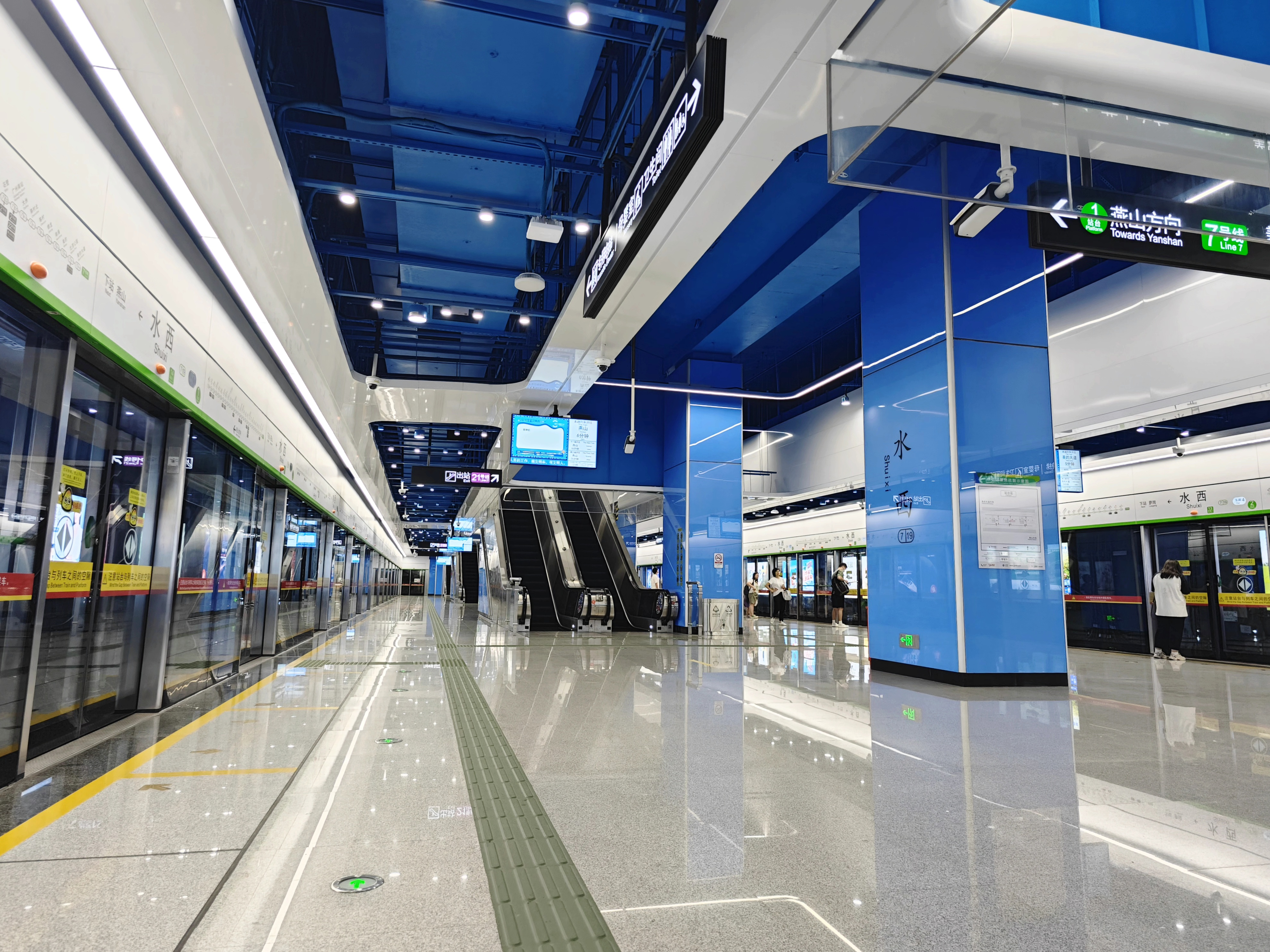
Line 7 platform

== History ==
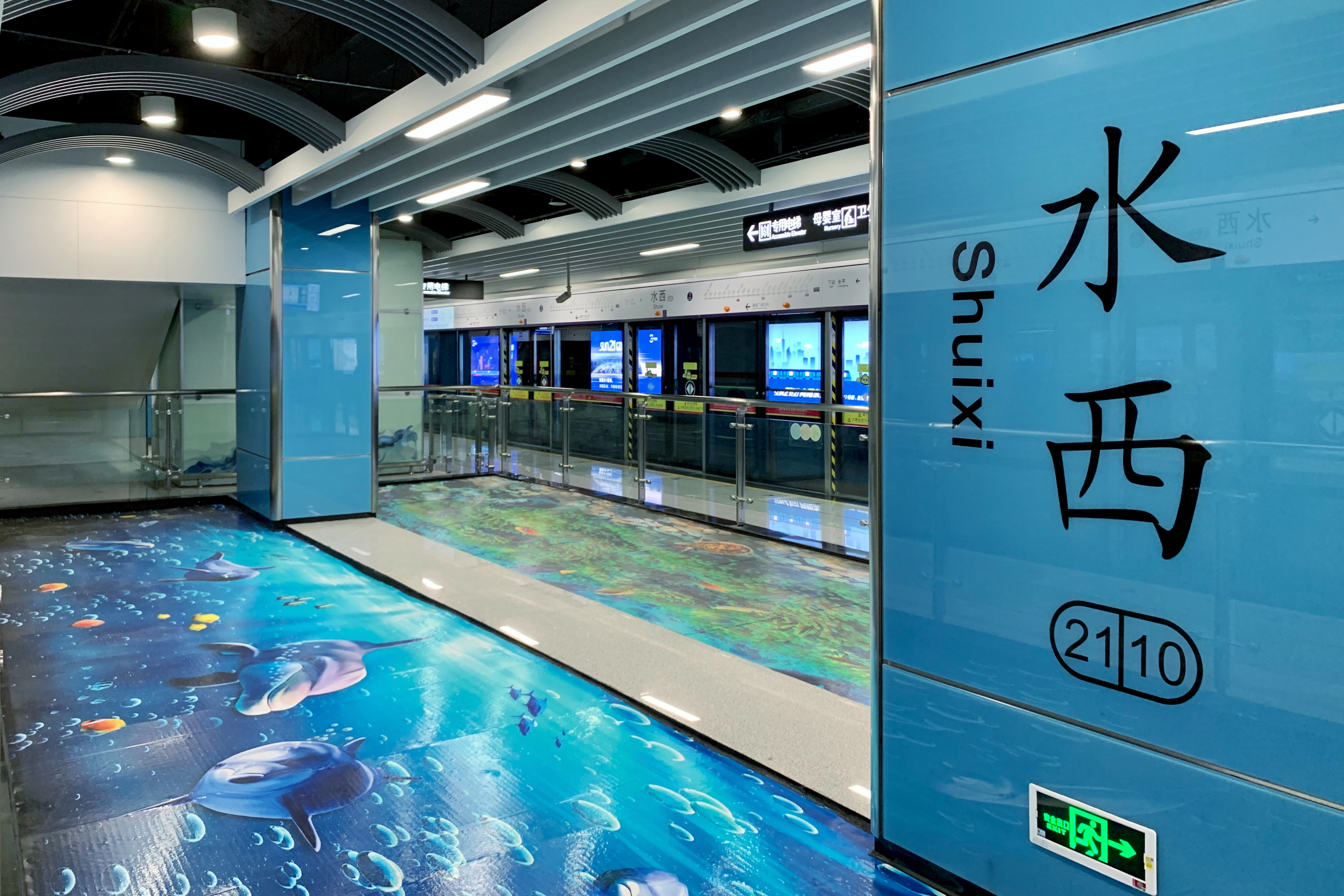
Line 21 reserved transfer node to Line 7 (December 2019)

Shuixi Station was originally planned as the northern terminus of Line 4. At the end of 2010, the northern extension of the original Line 4 (Huangcun-Shuixi) was singled out and extended to both ends to become Line 21. In order to cooperate with the express positioning of Line 21, this station was cancelled for a time; Later, the setting was resumed during the EIA stage, and construction was finally implemented.

In 2016, the second phase of Plan 7 was extended to Shuixi Station as the terminal station, and then further extended to Shuixibei Station (now Yanshan). Line 21 was not initially scheduled have a transfer with Line 7, but at the end of 2016, the station design was changed to include a reserved transfer point with Line 7.

On 30 April 2019, the "three rights" transfer was completed on Line 21 of this station. On 20 December of the same year, the station was opened with the opening of the remaining section of Line 21. In order to coincide with the upcoming opening of the second phase of Line 7, the express train of Line 21 was adjusted to stop at this station since 29 August 2023.

In October 2023, the "three rights" transfer was completed at the Line 7 station. On 28 December 2023, the station part of Line 7 officially opened with the opening of the second phase of Line 7, and the station became a transfer station.
