= Zhenlong station =

Zhenlong station may refer to:

- Zhenlong station (Guangzhou Metro), station of Guangzhou Metro
- Zhenlong railway station, station of Pearl River Delta Intercity Railway
