= Zengcheng Square station =

Guangzhou Metro station

Coordinates: 23°05′42″N 113°27′18″E

Zengcheng Square 增城广场
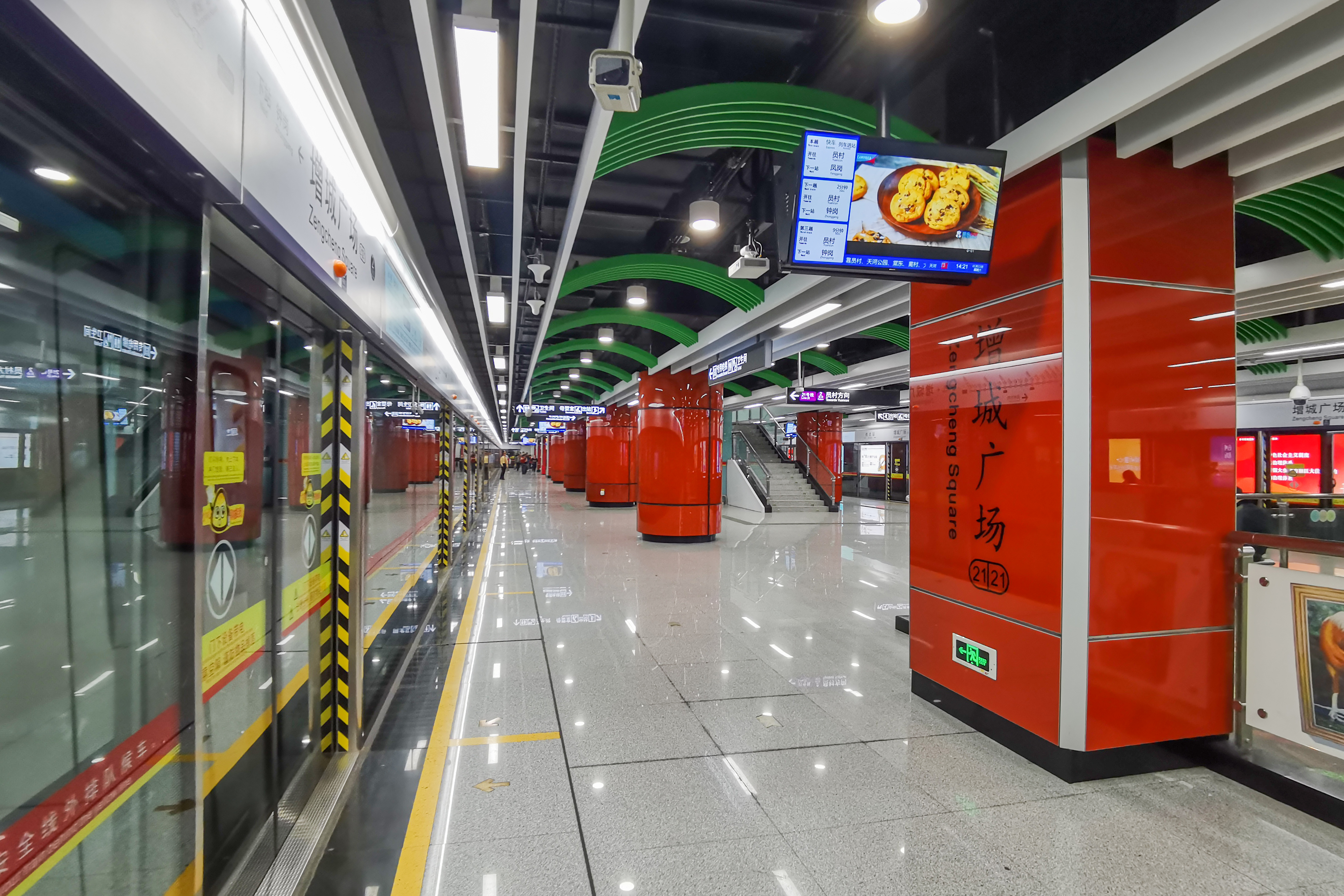
- Platform

Chinese name
- Simplified Chinese: 增城广场站
- Traditional Chinese: 增城廣場站
Transcriptions
Standard Mandarin
- Hanyu Pinyin: Zēngchéng Guǎngcháng Zhàn
Yue: Cantonese
- Jyutping: zang^{1}sing^{4}gwong^{2}coeng^{6} zaam^{6}

General information
- Location: Zengcheng Avenue (G324), Lijin Avenue, Lixin Highway intersection Zengcheng District, Guangzhou, Guangdong; China
- Operated by: Guangzhou Metro Co. Ltd.
- Line: Line 21
- Platforms: 2 (1 island platform)
- Tracks: 2

Construction
- Structure type: Underground
- Accessible: Yes

Other information
- Station code: 2121

History
- Opened: 28 December 2018; 7 years ago

Services
Preceding station	Guangzhou Metro	Following station
Zhonggang towards Tianhe Park	Line 21	Terminus
Fenggang towards Tianhe Park	Line 21 Express	Terminus
Location

Zengcheng Square station (Chinese: 增城广场站) is a station of Line 21 of the Guangzhou Metro, and the eastern terminus of Line 21. It is also the easternmost station of the Guangzhou Metro system. It started operations on 28 December 2018.

== Station layout ==
L1; Concourse	Lobby	Customer service, shops, vending machines, ATMs
L2; Platforms	Platform 2	21 towards Tianhe Park (Zhonggang / express: Fenggang)
L2; Platforms	Island platform, doors will open on the left
L2; Platforms	Platform 1	21 termination platform
L3; Platforms	Platform	16 reserved track area
L3; Platforms	Reserved island platform
L3; Platforms	Platform	16 reserved track area

== Exits ==
There are 6 exits, lettered A, B, C, D, E and F. Exit E is accessible. Exits A and B are located on Lixin Highway, exits C and F are located on Zengcheng Avenue and exit E is located on Lijin Avenue.

== Gallery ==
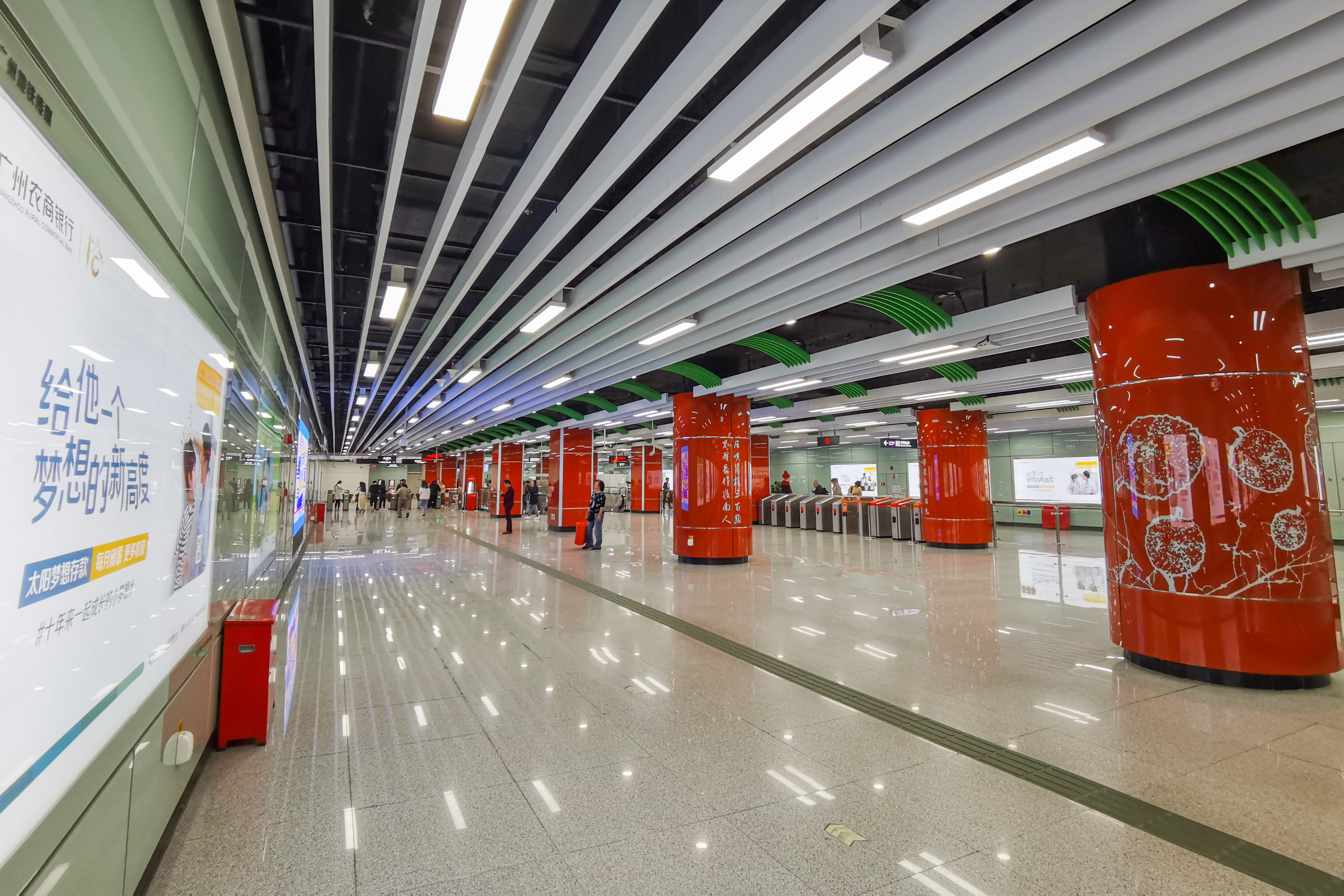
Concourse

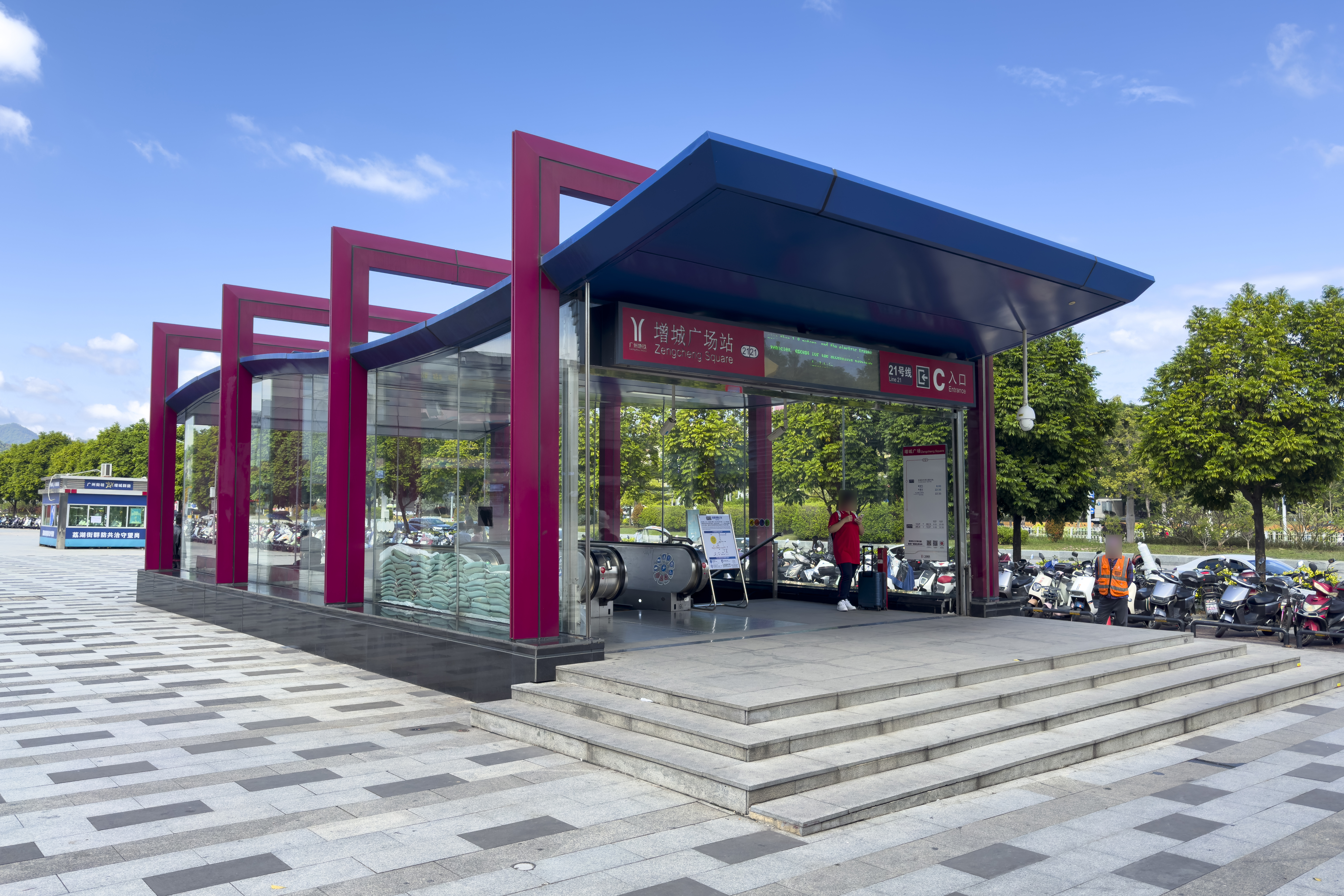
Exit C

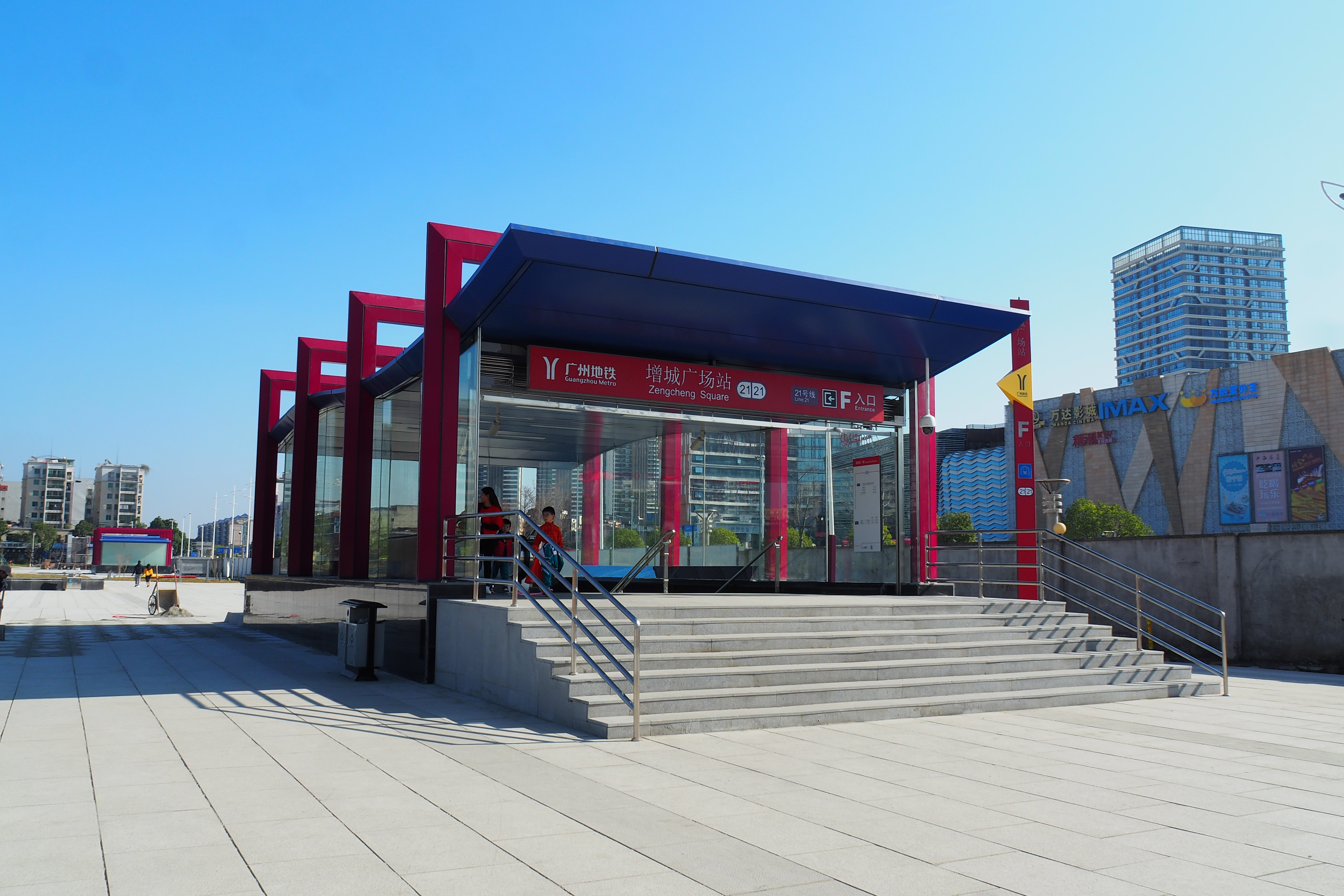
Exit F
