= Huangpu, Guangzhou =

Huangpu 黄埔区 Whampoa; Whangpoa
- District
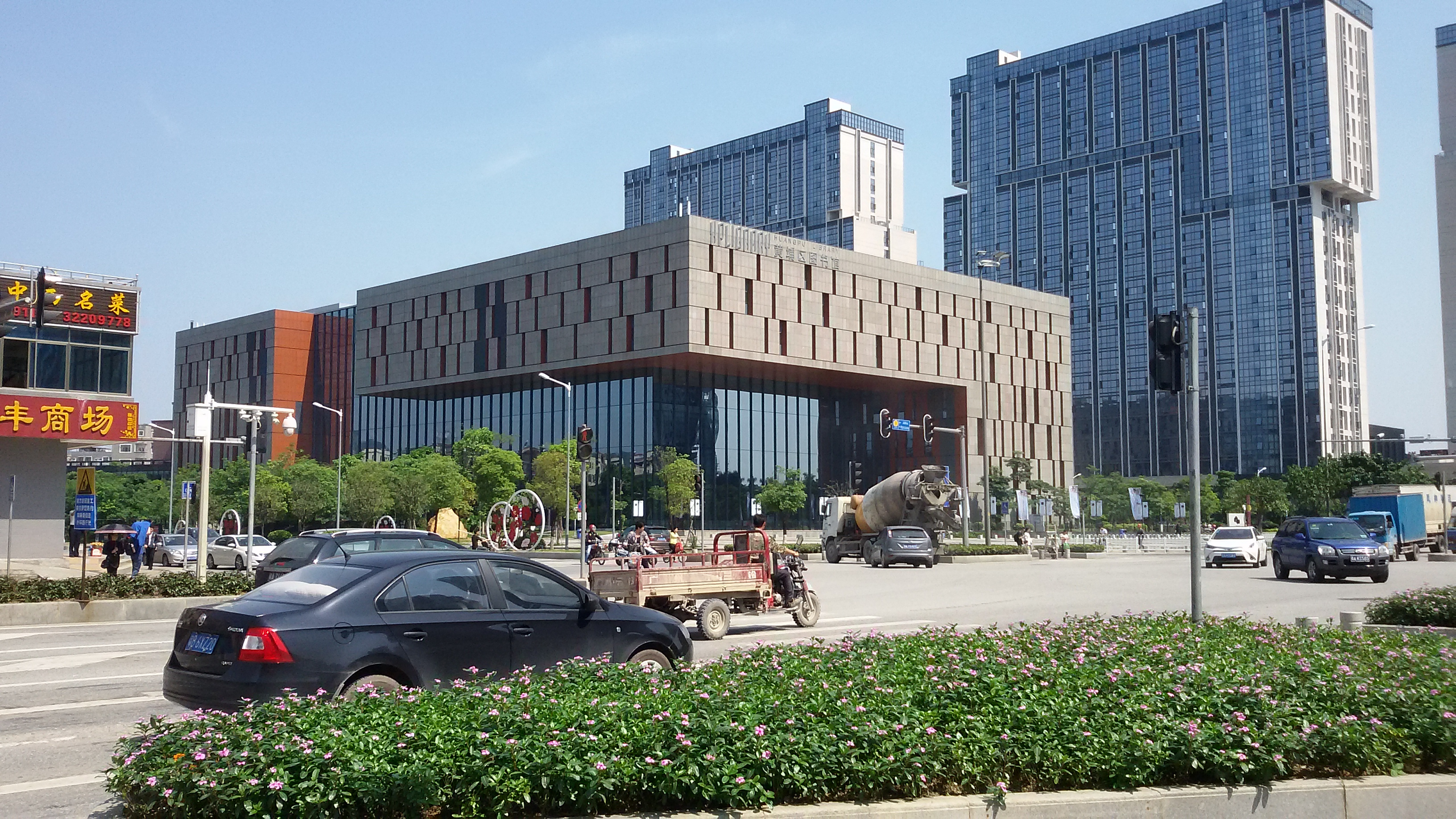
- Dasha Subdistrict

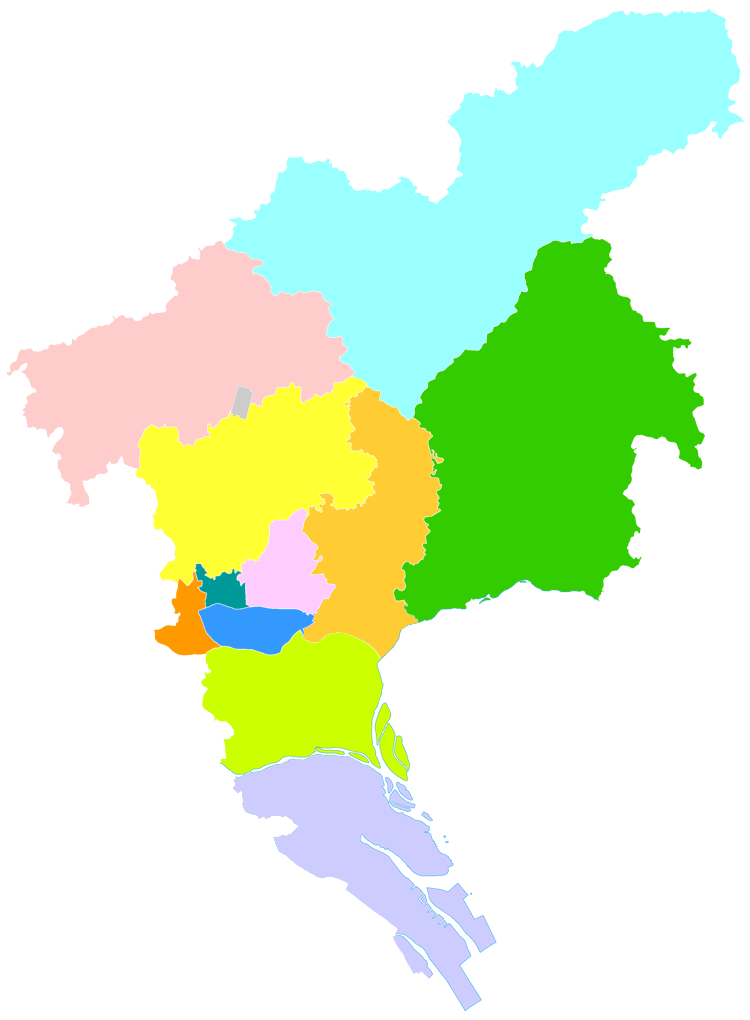
- Huangpu in Guangzhou
- Interactive map of Huangpu
- Country: People's Republic of China
- Province: Guangdong
- Sub-provincial city: Guangzhou

Area
  - Total: 484.17 km^{2} (186.94 sq mi)

Population (2020)
  - Total: 1,264,447
  - Density: 2,611.6/km^{2} (6,764.0/sq mi)
- Time zone: UTC+8 (China Standard)
- Postal code: 510700
- Area code: 020
- Website: www.hp.gov.cn

Huangpu, Guangzhou
- Simplified Chinese: 黄埔区
- Traditional Chinese: 黃埔區
- Guangdong Romanization: Wong4-bou3 Kêu1
- Hanyu Pinyin: Huángpǔ Qū
- Literal meaning: Yellow Bank District
Transcriptions
Standard Mandarin
- Hanyu Pinyin: Huángpǔ Qū
Yue: Cantonese
- Yale Romanization: Wòhngbou Kēui
- Jyutping: Wong4-bou3 Keoi1
- Canton Romanization: Wong4-bou3 Kêu1

Alternative Chinese name
- Simplified Chinese: 黄埔
- Traditional Chinese: 黃埔
- Guangdong Romanization: Wong4-bou3
- Hanyu Pinyin: Huángpǔ
Transcriptions
Standard Mandarin
- Hanyu Pinyin: Huángpǔ
Yue: Cantonese
- Yale Romanization: Wòhngbou
- Jyutping: Wong4-bou3
- Canton Romanization: Wong4-bou3

Huangpu, alternately romanized as Whampoa, is one of 11 urban districts of the prefecture-level city of Guangzhou, the capital of Guangdong Province, China. Despite its name, it does not include Huangpu Island (now Pazhou) or its famous anchorage. Huangpu absorbed Guangzhou's former Luogang District in 2014. The district has been awarded the status of "Happiest District of China" in 2020.

== History ==
During the Canton trade, Changzhou was known as "Dane's Island" and used by Danish crews for repairs and burials. It lay on the eastern side of the Huangpu or "Whampoa" anchorage, named for Huangpu Island (now Pazhou in Haizhu District). The Whampoa Military Academy was founded on Changzhou in 1924.

Huangpu district played an important role in China's economic development. Originally called "Guangzhou Development District", it was one of the first economic and technological development districts in China.

On 12 February 2014, Luogang District was dissolved by China's central government and its area added to Huangpu.

According to historical records, the family of one of the first two Chinese to immigrate to Germany in 1821/22 originally came from Huangpu. In an 1822 essay for the magazine Isis, Lorenz Oken described the two Chinese immigrants as "Aßing von Heong San, Aho von Wong Bu". As Rainer Schwarz argues, "Wong Bu" refers to the old transliteration "Whampoa", which means the family of Aho (whose actual name appears to have been FENG Yaxue) originated from the area that is today Huangpu District.

The new Huangpu district covers an area of 480.56 square kilometres (185.55 sq mi).

=== Population ===
As of the end of 2021, Whampoa District had a resident population of 1,197,900, with a population density of 2,474 people per square kilometer. The total household population was 636,600, an increase of 36,300 over the previous year, or a year-on-year increase of 6.1%. The birth rate of the household population was 17.6 per thousand, the death rate was 3.8 per thousand, and the natural population growth rate was 13.8 per thousand.

== Administrative divisions ==
Name		Chinese (S)	Hanyu Pinyin	Canton Romanization	Population (2010)	Area (km^{2})
Dasha Subdistrict		大沙街道	Dàshā Jiēdào	dai6 sa1 gai1 dou6	44,641	13.10
Huangpu Subdistrict		黄埔街道	Huángpǔ Jiēdào	wong4 bou3 gai1 dou6	64,255	7.38
Hongshan Subdistrict		红山街道	Hóngshān Jiēdào	hung4 san1 gai1 dou6	42,127	7.30
Yuzhu Subdistrict		鱼珠街道	Yúzhū Jiēdào	jyu4 zyu1 gai1 dou6	59,529	9.11
Wenchong Subdistrict		文冲街道	Wénchōng Jiēdào	men4 cung1 gai1 dou6	46,877	10.07
Nangang Subdistrict		南岗街道	Nángǎng Jiēdào	nam4 gong1 gai1 dou6	76,747	13.74
Changzhou Subdistrict		长洲街道	Chángzhōu Jiēdào	cêng4 zeo1 gai1 dou6	36,478	11.5
Suidong Subdistrict		穗东街道	Suìdōng Jiēdào	sêu6 dung1 gai1 dou6	45,025	13.58
Lilian Subdistrict		荔联街道	Lìlián Jiēdào	lei6 lün4 gai1 dou6	42,251	6.58
Guangzhou; Economic and Technological; Development; Zone	Luogang Subdistrict	萝岗街道	Luógǎng Jiēdào	lo4 gong1 gai1 dou6	45,717	80.10
Guangzhou; Economic and Technological; Development; Zone	Changling Subdistrict	长岭街道	Chánglǐng Jiēdào	cêng4 léng5 gai1 dou6	45,717	80.10
Guangzhou; Economic and Technological; Development; Zone	Xiagang Subdistrict	夏港街道	Xiàgǎng Jiēdào	ha6 gong2 gai1 dou6	44,528	14.54
Guangzhou; Economic and Technological; Development; Zone	Dongqu Subdistrict	东区街道	Dōngqū Jiēdào	dung1 kêu1 gai1 dou6	85,235	54.00
Guangzhou; Economic and Technological; Development; Zone	Yunpu Subdistrict	云埔街道	Yúnpǔ Jiēdào	wen4 bou3 gai1 dou6	85,235	54.00
Guangzhou; Economic and Technological; Development; Zone	Yunpu Subdistrict	云埔街道	Yúnpǔ Jiēdào	wen4 bou3 gai1 dou6	49,867	51.76
Guangzhou; Economic and Technological; Development; Zone	Lianhe Subdistrict	联和街道	Liánhé Jiēdào	lün4 wo4 gai1 dou6	49,867	51.76
Guangzhou; Economic and Technological; Development; Zone	Yonghe Subdistrict	永和街道	Yǒnghé Jiēdào	wing5 wo4 gai1 dou6	55,044	34.00
Guangzhou; Economic and Technological; Development; Zone	Jiufo Subdistrict	九佛街道	Jiǔfó Jiēdào	geo2 fed6 gai1 dou6	93,265	53.50
Guangzhou; Economic and Technological; Development; Zone	Longhu Subdistrict	龙湖街道	Lónghú Jiēdào	lung4 wu4 gai1 dou6	93,265	45.73
Guangzhou; Economic and Technological; Development; Zone	Xinlong town	新龙镇	Xīnlóng Zhèn	sen1 lung4 zen3	93,265	75.87

In September 2017, Huangpu District and Guangzhou Development District were deeply integrated. On September 18, 2018, Luogang Street was abolished and new Luogang Street and Changling Street were established; Lilian Street and East District Street were abolished and Yunpu Street was established.On March 7, 2019, Nine Dragons Town was abolished and Xinlong Town, Nine Buddhas Street and Longhu Street were established; on March 27, Yunpu Street was put up for establishment; on March 28, Changling Street was established; on March 30, the new Luogang Street was established.

== Economy ==
Huangpu District is the major innovation carrier for the Greater Bay Area which aims to make Guangzhou China's national core city and an integrated gateway. It will cultivate as a technological, educational, and cultural center, and develop as an international metropolis .

According to the unified accounting results of Guangzhou's regional gross domestic product (GDP), Huangpu District realized a regional gross domestic product (GDP) of 431.517 billion yuan in 2023, with a year-on-year growth of 1.2%. Among them, the added value of primary industry was 534 million yuan, an increase of 10.1% year-on-year; the added value of secondary industry was 232.594 billion yuan, a year-on-year decrease of 2.0%; the added value of tertiary industry was 198.390 billion yuan, an increase of 5.5% year-on-year; the structure of the three industries was adjusted to 0.1 : 53.9 : 46.0, with the proportion of the tertiary industry increasing by 3.8 percentage points compared with that of the previous year. The annual per capita GDP was 357,500 yuan, an increase of 0.2% year-on-year, higher than the city's average level of 195,900 yuan, 2.2 times the city's average level.

A series of innovative reforms were introduced, establishing national-level import trade promotion zones and enhancing the business ecosystem. This led to over 400 signed projects with investments exceeding 350 billion yuan, reinforcing Guangzhou's appeal to domestic and international investors.

In the first half of 2025, Guangzhou's Huangpu District continued to play a central role as a hub for technological innovation and advanced manufacturing in the Greater Bay Area. In manufacturing, Huangpu accelerated the development of key sectors such as high-end equipment, semiconductors, and new materials. Industry leaders including GAC AION, GE, Sany, SMIC, and Foxconn have established strong operations in the district, contributing to a robust ecosystem in smart vehicles, intelligent manufacturing, and green energy. The district has introduced a "Manufacturing First" policy suite to promote digital transformation and sustainability in its industrial base.

In 2023, Huangpu District in Guangzhou reported total research and experimental development (R&D) expenditure of RMB 29.383 billion, with R&D intensity (R&D expenditure as a percentage of GDP) reaching 6.81 percent, ranking highest among all Guangzhou districts. In 2024, Huangpu District recorded a gross domestic product (GDP) of 433.89 billion yuan, representing a year-on-year increase of 2.2% in real terms according to unified GDP accounting results for Guangzhou.

Improving livelihood and infrastructure

Huangpu district is one of the developing industrial districts in Guangzhou. According to a 2020 study by Deloitte, the district is already especially competitive in the industries of automobiles, electronics, energy, high-end chemicals, food and beverage, and electrical machinery. Emerging industries in the district include ICT, intelligent equipment, biomedicine, new energy, new materials, and services.

Huangpu district is at the heart of the Greater Bay Area (GBA) and is home to a large development area, which is considered one of China's most important economic centres. It is producing a regional GDP of US$49.3 billion and the district received a fixed asset investment of US$19.68 billion in 2019. The development district contributes 43% to Guangzhou's industrial output value and 70% of its high-tech product output value.

Huangpu district is an important area for international trade and investment. In 2019, the district recorded the highest volumes in exports and imports among the districts of Guangzhou, with an export volume of US$24.766 billion and an import volume of US$19.878 billion. Foreign investment in actual use for Huangpu district was US$2.28 billion the same year, prompting it to rank first among all development districts within China. The actual utilization of foreign investment reached in 2021 $2.57 billion while the district's foreign trade value exceeded 326 billion yuan.

Huangpu is home to the Guangzhou IP Court, which handles intellectual property (IP) right protection for companies and institutions. The application and approval process allows for founding and registering a new company or branch within one day, a process sometimes described as fast.

In 2021, Huangpu District counted a total of over 1,000 national institutions including laboratories, technology innovation centers, a series of Chinese Academy of Sciences institutes and various high-end R&D centers, accounting for half of Guangzhou's total. Furthermore, it is home to nine provincial high-level innovation institutes, accounting for two-thirds of the total in Guangdong Province. The area of science and technology incubators exceeded 5 million square meters, with a total of 113 incubators built, including 16 national incubators, accounting for 38% of the total in Guangzhou. The total number of high-tech enterprises in the region was 2,256, including 128 new high-tech enterprises in the same year; the number of science and technology-based small and medium-sized enterprises was over 2,000; 413 gazelle companies and 5 unicorn (potential unicorn) enterprises in the region were identified. Furthermore, 692 key projects in science and technology were approved with funding amounting to US$54.1 million by higher officials. The number of patents granted to enterprises was 26,813, accounting for 14.5% of the total number in Guangzhou. The total number of top talents selected for national talent programs at all levels reached 1,151, ranking first in Guangzhou and in the forefront of Guangdong Province.

Annual GDP growth of 1.2%, the region's fixed asset investment exceeded 200 billion yuan, an increase of 4.1%, the total amount of investment to maintain the national economic development zones and the province's first districts. General public budget revenue of 20.81 billion yuan, an increase of 14.3%, of which 16.78 billion yuan of tax revenue at the district level. Market players have flourished, with 49,000 newly registered market players, an increase of 91.5%, and 247,000 market players, an increase of 14.2%. The company has held 3 focused activities to start construction and put into trial production, with 183 projects started construction and 120 projects put into trial production. It has completed 8,630 acres of industrial land storage and introduced 402 new high-quality projects.

=== Industry Sectors ===
The division between primary, secondary and tertiary sectors has shifted since 2015. Back then, the tertiary sector accounted for 29.1% of Huangpu District's GDP, while the secondary sector accounted for 70.6% and the primary sector for only 0.3%. In 2019, the tertiary sector accounted for 35.7% of Huangpu District's GDP, with the secondary sector accounting for 64.1% and the primary sector having fallen to 0.2%. Thus, although the share of the tertiary sector has been growing, the dominating industry in Huangpu is still the secondary industry.

The dominance of the secondary sector can also be seen from the growing industrial output. Between 2017 and 2019, total industrial output value above designated size rose from RMB 745.91 Billion to RMB 739.65 Billion. Sector-wise, the total industrial output is divided as follows:

In 2021, Huangpu District counted a total of over 1,000 national institutions including laboratories, technology innovation centers, a series of Chinese Academy of Sciences institutes and various high-end R&D centers, accounting for half of Guangzhou's total. Furthermore, it is home to nine provincial high-level innovation institutes, accounting for two-thirds of the total in Guangdong Province.

According to the GDD official overview, Huangpu is anchored by several major industrial clusters, including five 500-billion-yuan–level clusters and three 10-billion-yuan–level clusters.

==== Automotive Industry ====
Huangpu district's automotive industry achieved a total industrial output value of RMB 167.88 billion in 2019. Companies present in Huangpu include Magna, Webasto, JATCO, Honda, Xpeng Motors, Stanley Electric, and Baoneng Motor.

==== Electronics Industry ====
Huangpu district's electronics industry achieved a total industrial output value of RMB 162.41 billion in 2019. Companies present include LG, Jabil Circuit, and Skyworth. Another notable company is Guangzhou Shiyuan Electronic Technology Company Limited, an LCD controller board supplier headquartered in Huangpu. From its founding in 2005, the LCD controller board supplier has grown to occupy over 29% of global and 61% of China's domestic market share in 2019.

==== Energy Industry ====
Huangpu district's energy industry achieved a total industrial output value of RMB 161.44 billion in 2019, drawing mainly from high-efficiency energy-saving equipment, the product considered most competitive in Huangpu district by Deloitte. Notable companies from the energy sector in Huangpu include China Southern Power Grid, Sinopec Group, Kinfa, Guangzhou Hengyun, Guangzhou Hirp Chemical, Guangdong Yuehua Power, and Guangzhou GCL Power.

==== High-end Chemical Industry ====
Huangpu district's high-end chemical industry achieved a total industrial output value of RMB 62.21 billion in 2019. The industry centers mostly around cosmetics, home care, fragrances, flavours, and fine chemicals. Notable companies include P&G, Amway, Colgate, and Guangzhou NipponPaint.

==== Food & Beverage Industry ====
Huangpu district's food and beverage industry achieved a total industrial output value of RMB 57.89 billion in 2019. It is composed of high-end food, functional food, green and organic food, urban leisure food, and health food. Notable companies include Mars, Pepsi, Coca-Cola, MeadJohnson, BiosTime, Uni-President, and Yantang Dairy.

In September 2023, Yihexi Technology has been granted the automated food production and sale business license by the Huangpu district market regulatory bureau, becoming the first company in Guangdong province to obtain the license.

==== Electrical Machinery Industry ====
Huangpu district's electrical machinery industry achieved a total industrial output value of RMB 22.56 billion in 2019. The industry is, for instance, processing equipment, measurement and control devices. Notable companies include Panasonic, Hitachi, Siemens, Schneider, Guangzhou Nanyang Cable, and Guangzhou Zhiguang Electric.

==== Emerging Industries ====
Huangpu's new-generation information technology industry consists of integrated circuits, new types of display panels, intelligent terminals and other operation services for intelligent finance, big data, and service providers for telecommunication and information technology. In 2019, these sectors achieved a cumulative total industrial output of RMB 161.47 billion. Representative companies include Guangzhou CanSemi Technology, LG, Shiyuan Electronic, GRG Banking, Comba Telecom or Haige Communications.

The district is furthermore developing three foundations for future industries:

First, 5G and autonomous driving. In 2019, the district had constructed 2,500 5G base stations, two 5G intelligent factories and a demonstration district for autonomous driving utilising 5G. First trials have shown that data collection for the development of autonomous driving in Guangzhou has been much better than in Silicon Valley. While the number of cars encountered by the trial vehicle has been around the same in both places, the number of pedestrians was five times higher in Guangzhou than in Silicon Valley, and the number of cyclists four times as high. This allowed for a much richer generation of data on autonomous driving.

Second, Blockchain. According to a 2020 report by Deloitte, the district has applied blockchain technology to a variety of services, including finance, manufacturing, QC and government services.

Third, Industrial Internet. According to the same report by Deloitte, the district is pushing the construction of national-level nodes in the "Industrial Internet Identification Resolution". Broadly speaking, this "Industrial Internet Identification Resolution" (simplified Chinese: 国家工业互联网标识解析体系; traditional Chinese: 國家工業互聯網標識解析體系; pinyin: Guójiā Gōngyè Hùliánwǎng Biāozhì Jiěxī Tǐxì; lit. 'National Industrial Internet Identification Analysis System') allows for the identification of entities and virtual objects within the internet of things, and can be compared to the Domain Name System (DNS) already in use today.

==== Low-Altitude Economy and Aviation Innovations ====
The district is pioneering in the low-altitude economy, which includes the development of aerial innovations. Notably, EHang Holdings, based in Huangpu, received the first certification for crewed eVTOL (electric vertical take-off and landing) aircraft, positioning the district at the forefront of the urban aerial transportation sector. Huangpu is actively integrating low-altitude economic activities with urban management and tourism, and the district boasts 45 enterprises involved in the low-altitude industrial chain. EHang, headquartered in Huangpu, has led global developments in eVTOL (electric vertical take-off and landing) aircraft. The district now hosts over 45 companies across the low-altitude aviation supply chain, offering applications in logistics, inspection, cultural tourism, and intra-city mobility. Huangpu's ecosystem includes testing bases, operational platforms, and UAV manufacturing clusters.

Huangpu District is actively developing its low-altitude economy, primarily focusing on general aviation and related industries, including the research, manufacturing, operation, and services of low-altitude aircraft such as drones and helicopters. The growth of the low-altitude economy in Huangpu District plays a significant role in diversifying and modernizing the regional economy.

===== Industry Foundation and Advantages =====
Huangpu District, as an economic and technological development zone in Guangzhou, boasts a strong industrial foundation and policy support. The district has attracted a number of companies specializing in aircraft manufacturing, drone research and development, and aviation services, forming a relatively complete industrial chain. Its advantageous geographical location, combined with robust logistics, technology, and manufacturing capabilities, provides substantial support for the development of the low-altitude economy.

===== Policy Support =====
The Guangzhou municipal government and the Huangpu District government have introduced several policies to support the development of the low-altitude economy, such as the "Guangzhou Low-Altitude Economic Development Plan (2020-2035)" and "Several Measures to Promote Low-Altitude Economic Development in Huangpu District and Guangzhou Development Zone." These policies aim to promote the construction of low-altitude economic infrastructure, enhance technological innovation, optimize industrial layout, and encourage investment and innovation in the low-altitude economy sector.

===== Technology and Innovation =====
Huangpu District is actively promoting technological innovation in the low-altitude economy, focusing on the development of core technologies for drones, general aviation aircraft, and smart flying vehicles. For instance, drones are increasingly used in logistics, inspection, agriculture, and emergency rescue. Multiple high-tech companies and research institutions in the district are dedicated to advancing technological breakthroughs and industrializing the low-altitude economy.

===== Key Projects and Companies =====
The district hosts several key projects related to the low-altitude economy, such as drone R&D and manufacturing bases and general aviation industry parks. Additionally, a number of leading companies and startups, like DJI and EHang, are actively engaged in the low-altitude economy in Huangpu, making the district an important hub for innovation in this sector.

===== Expansion of Application Scenarios =====
The application scenarios for the low-altitude economy in Huangpu District are expanding, covering areas such as logistics distribution, urban management, environmental monitoring, emergency rescue, and tourism. Particularly, the application of drone technology in urban logistics and emergency rescue offers new solutions for smart city management.

===== Future Development Prospects =====
With the national policy's further opening up of low-altitude sectors and the maturity of technologies like drones, the low-altitude economy in Huangpu District is expected to play an increasingly significant role in the economic structure. In the future, the district may see further breakthroughs in smart manufacturing of low-altitude aircraft, the construction of low-altitude transportation systems, and the development of related service industries.

Overall, the low-altitude economy in Guangzhou's Huangpu District is in a stage of rapid growth and shows great potential for development, driven by policy support and technological innovation.

=== Industry Clusters ===
Huangpu district is home to four industry clusters. First, the China-Singapore Guangzhou Knowledge City (CSGKC) focused on knowledge-intensive economy and future industries. Second, Huangpu Lingang Economic Zone focused on service industries. Third, Guangzhou Science City focused on innovation and research and development. Fourth, Guangzhou International Biotech Island focusing on biomedicine. All of them are supported through national subsidies and preferential policies.

==== China-Singapore Guangzhou Knowledge City ====
CSGKC, also known as "Sino-Singapore Guangzhou Knowledge City" or simply "Guangzhou Knowledge City", is focused on knowledge-intensive economy and future industries such as information technology, high-end equipment manufacturing, green economy, biomedicine, digital economy, new materials and artificial intelligence. It covers an area of 123 square kilometres. The area combines industrial development with supporting facilities, research and development institutes, residential areas and cultural attractions.

CSGKC is located around 35 km northeast of Guangzhou city centre and around 25 km from Guangzhou Baiyun International Airport. The area was started in 2010 as a greenfield master development by Sino-Singapore Guangzhou Knowledge City Investment and Development Co., Ltd., a joint venture between Singapore-based CapitaLand and the district government of Huangpu. In 2018, the initiative was elevated to a bilateral state-level cooperation project between Singapore and the People's Republic of China. Since its inception, a total of 1,803 enterprises have registered in the area by 2020, with registered capital reaching US$21.35 billion and fixed asset investment reaching around US$20.35 billion.

CSGKC is home to several companies and projects. Notable among those is for instance Guangzhou CanSemi Technology, which runs the only 12-inch wafer production line in Guangdong province in the CSGKC. Another notable project is Baidu's Apollo R&D Centre, where smart vehicles are researched and tested.

GSGKC is also home to several academic institutions. First, the Sino-Singapore International Joint Research Institute jointly set up by the CSGKC Administrative Committee, South China University of Technology, Nanyang Technological University, and Sino-Singapore Guangzhou Knowledge City Investment and Development Co., Ltd. The institute is staffed with Singaporian and Chinese professionals and focuses on the key industries of CSGKC detailed above. It engages in the research and development of new products and processes. In doing so, it cooperates with local companies and investors and incubates enterprises. Second, Huangpu Institute of the university of the Chinese Academy of Social Sciences (UCASS), which was set up in 2020.

A Concept Master Plan has been developed for CSGKC, which aims to integrate comprising hi-tech business parks, residential, commercial, recreational and public amenities in one area – including neighbourhood centres. green connectors and water parks. This Master Plan embodies a network through the entire City, with large green belts dividing it into the Northern, Central and Southern Towns. This Concept Master Plan has been approved and given considered weight by the Municipal Government.

==== Huangpu Lingang Economic Zone ====
Huangpu Lingang Economic Zone is situated in the southern part of Huangpu district. It covers an area of 27 square kilometres of landmass and 15 square kilometres of water, and it focuses on modern service industries. Situated right at the Yangtze River, the cluster is home to coastline ports, as well as the second Guangzhou Central Business District. Its foci include port and shipping services, industrial finance, SciTech innovation, human resources, high-end and e-commerce, cultural tourism and cruise industry. It is envisioned to become an integrated service centre for international shipping and it is expected to become a key linking point for the Maritime Silk Road part of the Belt and Road Initiative.

==== Guangzhou Science City ====
Guangzhou Science City (GSC) covers an area of 37.47 square kilometres. It focuses on high-tech industries, research and development institutions and human capital development. It is home to ISA Science City International School, as well as companies such as Samsung, LG, Sony, Hitachi, Cedar Center, Skyworth, Baoneng, Bio-Thera, Wondfo, and Xiangxue Pharmaceutical. According to a report by Deloitte, GSC will be involved in the construction of CASICloud, Ali feilonglink and the Smart-IC of China State Shipbuilding Corporation Ltd.

==== Guangzhou International Biotech Island ====
Guangzhou International Biotech Island (GIBI), formally known as Guanzhou Island or Dove Island, is a biomedicine cluster within Huangpu district. It forms the centre of the biotechnological industry base of Guangzhou. By 2020, around 130 pharmaceutical companies had settled on the island, among those KingMed Diagnostics or Riton-Biomaterial. In 2021, Geneseeq Technology Inc. and AstraZeneca announced their plans to establish a Bio-Diagnostic Innovation Center on the island.

The island brings together domestic and international high-end biomedicine companies and research and development centres. Among those are biotechnological research and development institutions, as well as biological service providers. A study commissioned by the German Federal Ministry for Economic Affairs and Climate Action predicts that the island will develop into a multifunctional biotechnology centre of the GBA, as it is located within the city centre of Guangzhou and well-integrated into its trade- and business systems.

Bio Island is home to 500+ life science companies, which include enterprises operating in the fields of biomedicine, medical devices, genetics & protein engineering, and medical testing & diagnostics.

In addition, the Bio Island offers Abundant medical resources with the highest coverage rate of tertiary hospitals in China. Bio Island is home to one of the three China major medical centers and offers 6 hospital beds per 1,000 people by 2020 (worldwide average 2.38).

=== Foreign economic activities ===
In 2021, the total import and export volume of Huangpu District reached US$48.12 billion, an increase of 17.3% year-on-year, accounting for 30.2% of the city's total import and export volume. The share of imports and exports in emerging markets continued to grow, with increased imports and exports activities mainly to ASEAN, the EU, South Korea and Mexico.

Regarding foreign investment activities, Huangpu District received US$5.625 billion in 2021, an increase of 26.6% year-on-year. There were 317 projects with contracted total foreign investment of US$3.801 billion in the tertiary sector, accounting for 67.6% of the total amount in the district, mainly concentrated in scientific R&D and experimental projects, leasing and business services, accounting for 47.5% and 24.2% of the total tertiary sector respectively.

=== Financial Institutions ===
The district is home to several different financial institutions. Among these are traditional banks (such as Guangzhou Rural Commercial Bank) and venture capitalists (such as Baidu Ventures or Korea Investment Partners). Nevertheless, banks amount to the most significant number (27 in December 2020), followed by insurers (25), financial lease (22), and others (19).

Among these institutions, the Guangdong Equity Exchange is particularly noteworthy. Being the only securities exchange in Guangdong Province, companies from all across the province are listed and displayed there. At the end of November 2020, their number totalled 19,726, with total financing and trading transactions of RMB 120.707 billion.

== Transportation ==
=== Public Transportation ===
In terms of infrastructure, the district advanced its "rail + express" connectivity strategy. In June 2025, the northern section of Tram Line 2 officially opened, significantly enhancing access to key innovation parks. The Yongjiu Expressway was also completed, improving north-south connectivity with Baiyun and Huadu districts. Meanwhile, the landmark "Knowledge Tower" reached its structural peak, symbolizing the emergence of a new center for scientific and industrial development in Guangzhou Science City.

=== Metro ===
Huangpu is currently serviced by six lines on the Guangzhou Metro:

- Line 5 - Yuzhu 13 , Dashadi, Dashadong 7 , Wenchong, Shuangsha, Miaotou, Xiayuan 13 , Baoying Dadao, Xiagang, Huangpu New Port
- Line 6 - Huangbei, Jinfeng, Xiangang, Suyuan 21 , Luogang 7 , Xiangxue
- Line 7 - Shenjing, Changzhou, Yufengwei 13 , Dashadong 5 , Jitang, Jiazhuang, Kefeng Lu, Luogang 6 , Shuixi 21 , Yanshan
- Line 13 - Yuzhu 5 , Yufengwei 7 , Shuanggang, Nanhai God Temple, Xiayuan 5 , Nangang
- Line 14 - Hongwei, Xinnan, Fengxia, Sino-Singapore Guangzhou Knowledge City, Hetangxia, Wangcun, Tangcun, Zhenlongbei, Zhenlong 21
- Line 21 - Shenzhoulu, Science City, Suyuan 6 , Shuixi 7 , Changping, Jinkeng, Zhenlongxi, Zhenlong 14

== Education ==
Huangpu's education system is characterized primarily by its rapid growth and the expansion of universities and research projects.

=== Schools ===
The district features a wide range of public schools, such as the Guangzhou University-affiliated middle school (simplified Chinese: 广州大学附属中学; traditional Chinese: 廣州大學附屬中學; pinyin: Guǎngzhōu Dàxué Fùshǔ Zhōngxué; Jyutping: gwong2 zau1 daai6 hok6 fu6 suk6 zung1 hok6), which are spread over the "Huanghua Road Campus" and the "University Town Campus", as well as numerous others. Listing them would lead too far at this point, but they can be looked up under the given source.

Apart from public schools, the district also encompasses several private and international schools. Among them are for example:

- Guangzhou International Primary School ZWIE (simplified Chinese: 广州市黄埔中黄外国语小学; traditional Chinese: 廣州市黃埔中黃外國語小學; pinyin: Guǎngzhōu Shì Huángpǔ Zhōnghuáng Wàiguóyǔ Xiǎoxué; Jyutping: gwong2 zau1 si5 wong4 bou3 zung1 wong4 ngoi6 gwok3 jyu5 siu2 hok6)
- Guangzhou International Middle School Huangpu ZWIE (merged with Guangzhou International Primary School ZWIE in 2021 to offer consecutive 9-year education according to the International Baccalaureate standard)
- North Anglia International School Guangzhou (simplified Chinese: Nord Anglia 广州外籍人员子女学校; traditional Chinese: Nord Anglia 廣州外籍人員子女學校; pinyin: Nord Anglia Guǎngzhōu Wàijí Rényuán Zǐnǚ Xuéxiào; Jyutping: Nord Anglia gwong2 zau1 ngoi6 zik6 jan4 jyun4 zi2 neoi5 hok6 haau6)
- American International School of Guangzhou (simplified Chinese: 广州美国人国际学校; traditional Chinese: 廣州美國人國際學校; pinyin: Guǎngzhōu Měiguórén Guójì Xuéxiào; Jyutping: gwong2 zau1 mei5 gwok3 jan4 gwok3 zai3 hok6 haau6). Its middle and high school campus is located in the Guangzhou Science City (科学城; 科學城; Kēxuéchéng; fo1 hok6 sing4), in the former Luogang District.
- ISA Science City International School (simplified Chinese: 广州科学城爱莎外籍人员子女学校; traditional Chinese: 廣州科學城愛莎外籍人員子女學校; pinyin: Guǎngzhōu Kēxuéchéng Àishā Wàijí Rényuán Zǐnǚ Xuéxiào; Jyutping: gwong2 zau1 fo1 hok6 sing4 ngoi3 saa1 ngoi6 zik6 jan4 jyun4 zi2 neoi5 hok6 haau6). An International Baccalaureate candidate school, It offers education from early childhood (starting from age two) to grade 12.
- SingChina Academy (simplified Chinese: 广州新侨学校; traditional Chinese: 廣州新僑學校; pinyin: Guǎngzhōu Xīnqiáo Xuéxiào; Jyutping: gwong2 zau1 san1 kiu4 hok6 haau6). This international school opened at China-Singapore Guangzhou Knowledge City in September 2021. It is a cooperation project between Singapore and China, and it is affiliated with the Singaporean Hwa Chong family of schools. It offers a 12-year bilingual, international curriculum covering primary, middle and high school levels, integrating both Chinese and western education.

=== Universities ===
Throughout Guangdong Province, there are a large number of universities and colleges with a wide variety of orientations, of which about 30 are in the capital city of Guangzhou. Of the universities represented in Guangzhou, some have campuses in Huangpu, such as Guangzhou University, which maintains a research campus there. Foreign universities are also represented. For instance, the University of Birmingham maintains a research centre in Huangpu District.

In addition, there are ambitions to construct several universities in Huangpu. The district's "Vision 2035" plans to build its own Huangpu University (黄埔大学; 黃埔大學; Huángpǔ Dàxué; wong4 bou3 daai6 hok6) between 2021 and 2025. It also aims to form Guangzhou Jiaotong University (广州交通大学; 廣州交通大學; Guǎngzhōu Jiāotōng Dàxué; gwong2 zau1 gaau1 tung1 daai6 hok6) by merging several universities. On its website, the district government further specifies that the university, when completed, should cover a total area of over 780,000 square meters and provide space for teaching and offices. It is also expected to function as a new research center.

==== Research Institutes ====
Huangpu is home to several research institutes that support research and development in the district. Some of them are operated by Huangpu's local universities, others affiliated with universities from other cities or countries. As detailed above, Guangzhou University and the University of Birmingham both maintain research institutes in Huangpu District, whilst the China-Singapore Guangzhou Knowledge City is home to the Sino-Singapore International Joint Research Institute and the Huangpu Institute of the university of the Chinese Academy of Social Sciences.

In the future, according to the district's official website, there are plans to expand research institutions. For example, the Huangpu Research Institute of Guangzhou University has been under expansion since the end of 2021 and is expected to include its own academic exchange centre, offices and laboratories in the future. Guangdong University of Foreign Studies (GDUFS) plans to build a specific research institute in Huangpu in 2022. Both the research institute of Guangdong University and Guangzhou University are part of the comprehensive development plan of the specially launched "Science and Education Innovation Zone" (2020–2023) of CSGKC.

=== Large Talent Pool ===
Guangdong's 80% universities and 70% R&D agencies are located in Guangzhou, with over 500,000 graduates each year, providing a sufficient talent reserve for Huangpu.

The District has teams led by Nobel Prize Winners, and professional teams led by academicians Zhong Nanshan, Wang Xiaodong, Shi Yigong, etc. So far, over 100 academicians and 1,000 high-caliber talents have joined the District, making it a destination for talents in China.

== Culture ==
Culturally, Huangpu District integrates with the customs and traditions of southern China and, in particular, with those of the surrounding southern Chinese province of Guangdong. Huangpu was first settled during the Neolithic period, and a number of cultural artifacts have survived to the present day, such as traditional Lingan buildings and gardens.

Boluodan Temple Fair, also known as the Nanhai God Temple Fair, has been held since the Song dynasty. It is a local temple fair in memory of the God Zhurong and to celebrate his birthday. As the only folk custom worshiping a sea god in China, Boluodan Temple Fair was selected among the third batch of Chinese intangible cultural heritage in 2011.

== See also ==
- Changzhou
- Pazhou, the island formerly known as Huangpu ("Whampoa")
