= Guangzhou Economic and Technological Development Zone =

Area of Guangzhou, China

Guangzhou Economic and Technological Development District (GETDD; Chinese: 广州经济技术开发区; pinyin: Guǎngzhōu jīngjì jìshù kāifāqū; Jyutping: Gwong^{2}zau^{1} ging^{1}zai^{3} gei^{6}seot^{6} hoi^{1}faat^{3}keoi^{1}) is one of the first national economic development zones in China.

== History ==
The development zone was established in 1984. It is located at 30 kilometres away east of Guangzhou downtown in an enclave in Luogang District. It has a developed area of 17.67 square kilometres. It is located at about 50–100 km away from Guangzhou Baiyun International Airport and its closest port is Shenzhen Port.

There are six pillar industries in the zone, including chemical materials and products, electric machinery, foodstuffs, electronic equipment, metallurgy and metal fabricating, and beverages. The zone was merged to Luogang District, a new-form district in Guangzhou, in 2005.
