= Tangdong station =

Metro station in Guangzhou, China

Tangdong 棠东
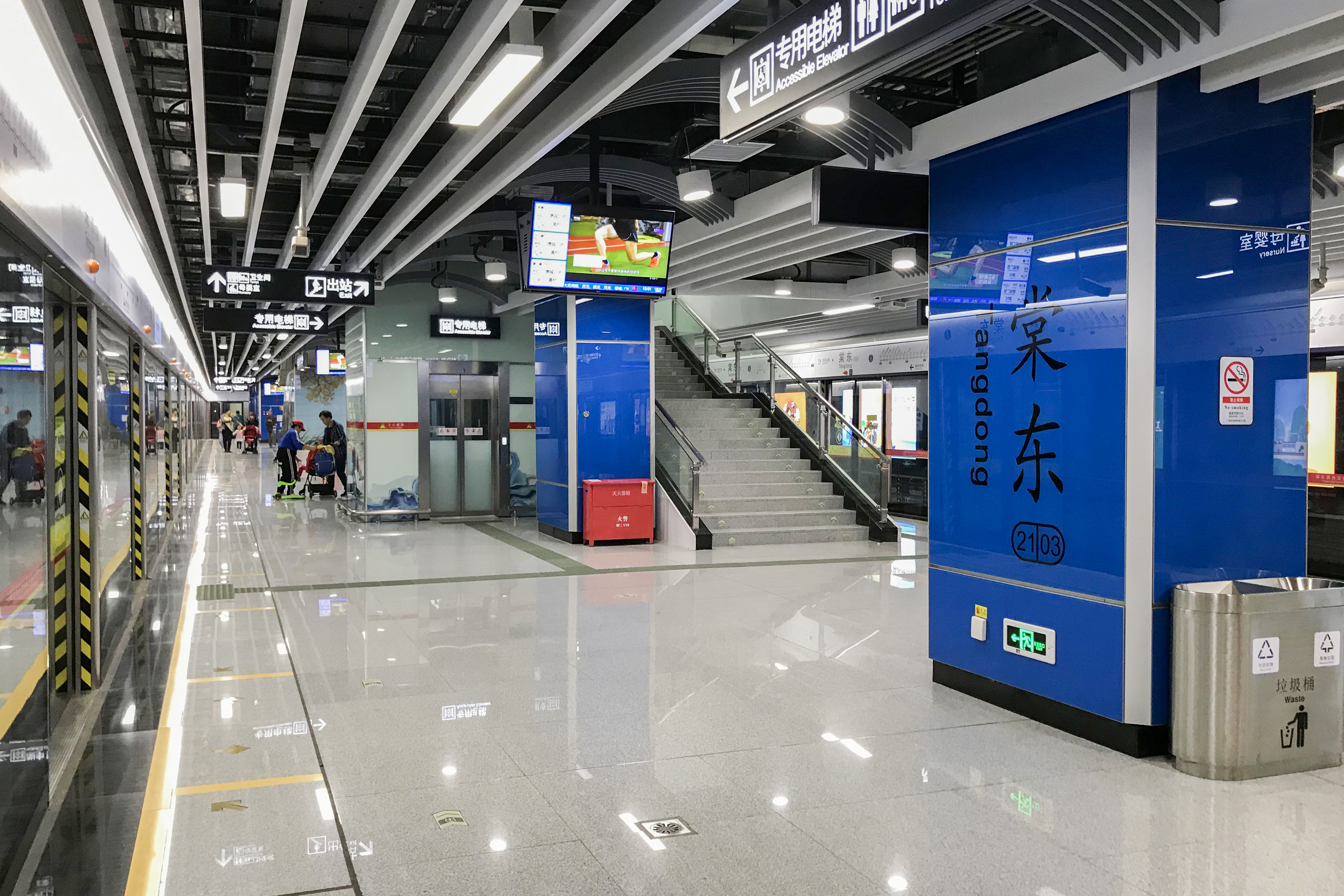
- Platform 1

Chinese name
- Simplified Chinese: 棠东站
- Traditional Chinese: 棠東站
Transcriptions

General information
- Location: Tai'an North Road, Tangdong East Road, Tianhe District, Guangzhou, Guangdong; China
- Coordinates: 23°08′00″N 113°23′04″E
- Operated by: Guangzhou Metro Co. Ltd.
- Line: Line 21
- Platforms: 2 (1 island platform)
- Tracks: 2

Construction
- Structure type: Underground
- Accessible: Yes

Other information
- Station code: 2103

History
- Opened: 20 December 2019; 6 years ago

Services
Preceding station	Guangzhou Metro	Following station
Tianhe Park Terminus	Line 21	Huangcun towards Zengcheng Square
Location

Tangdong station (Chinese: 棠东站) is a station of Line 21 of the Guangzhou Metro. It started operations on 20 December 2019.

== Station layout ==
Tangdong has two levels: a concourse, and an island platform with two tracks for line 21.

== Exits ==
There are 3 exits, lettered A, B and D. Exit D is accessible. All exits are located on Tai'an North Road.

== Gallery ==
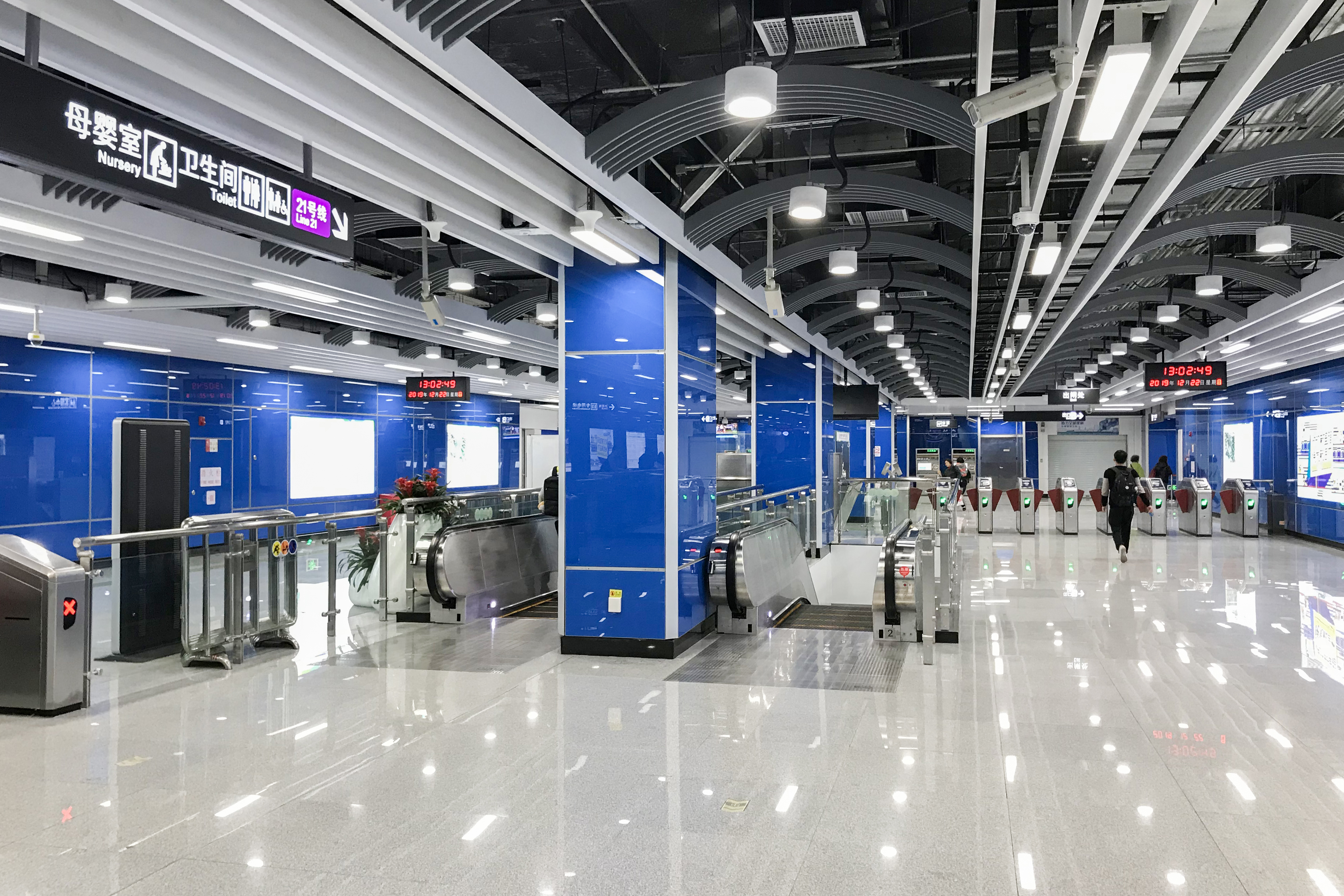
Concourse

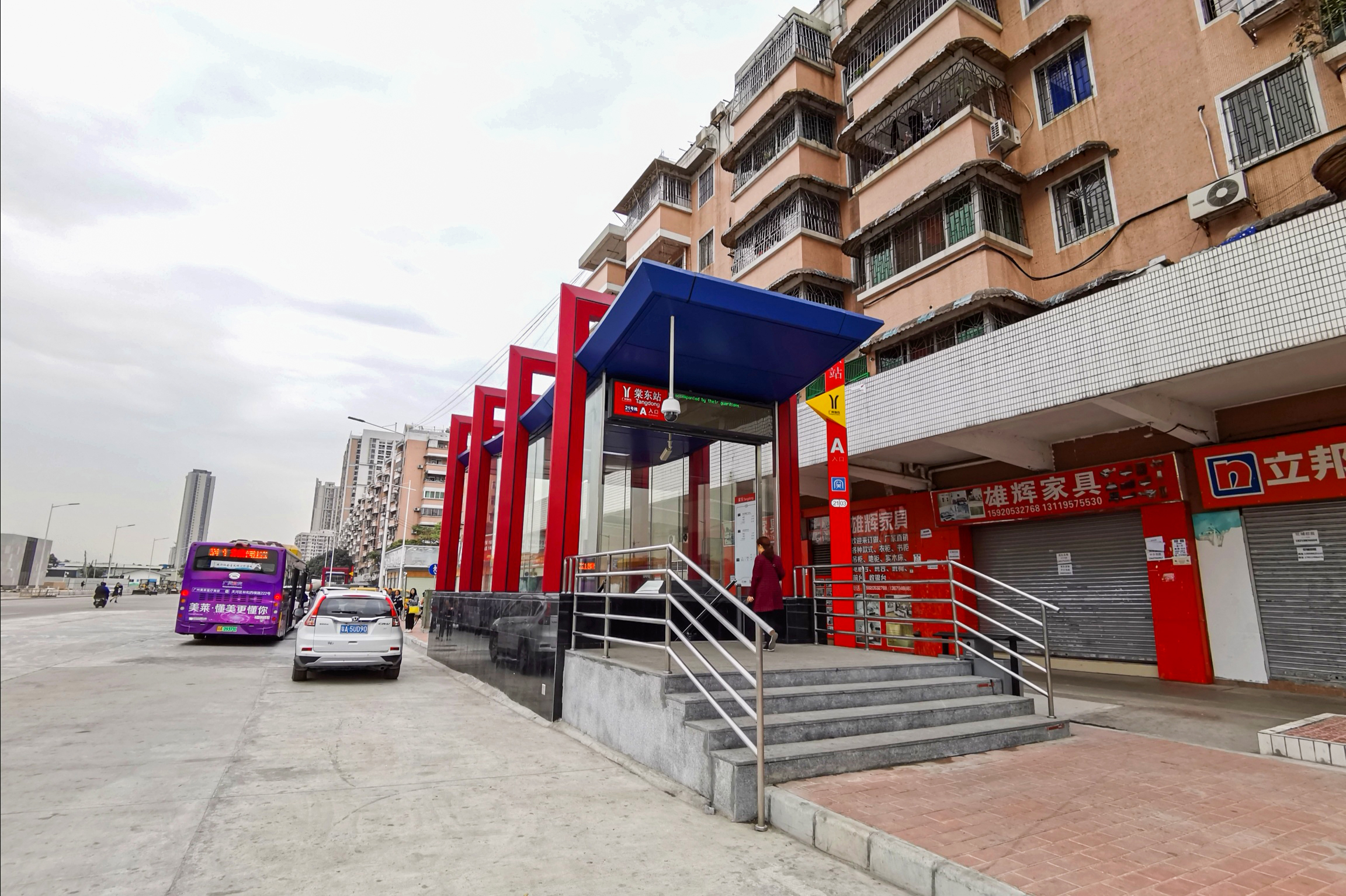
Exit A

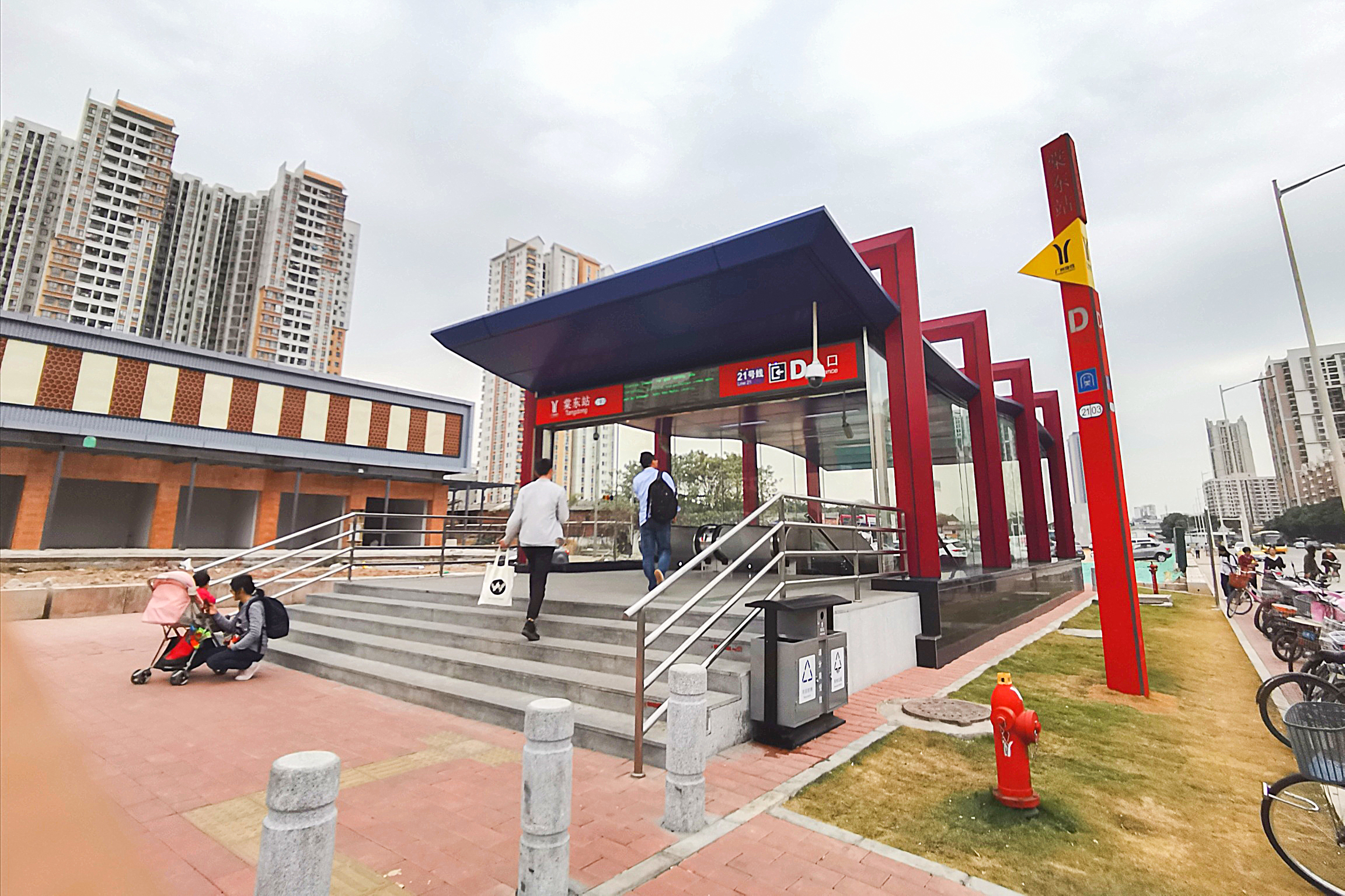
Exit D
