= Suyuan station =

Guangzhou Metro station

Coordinates: 23.17097°N 113.468482°E

Suyuan 苏元
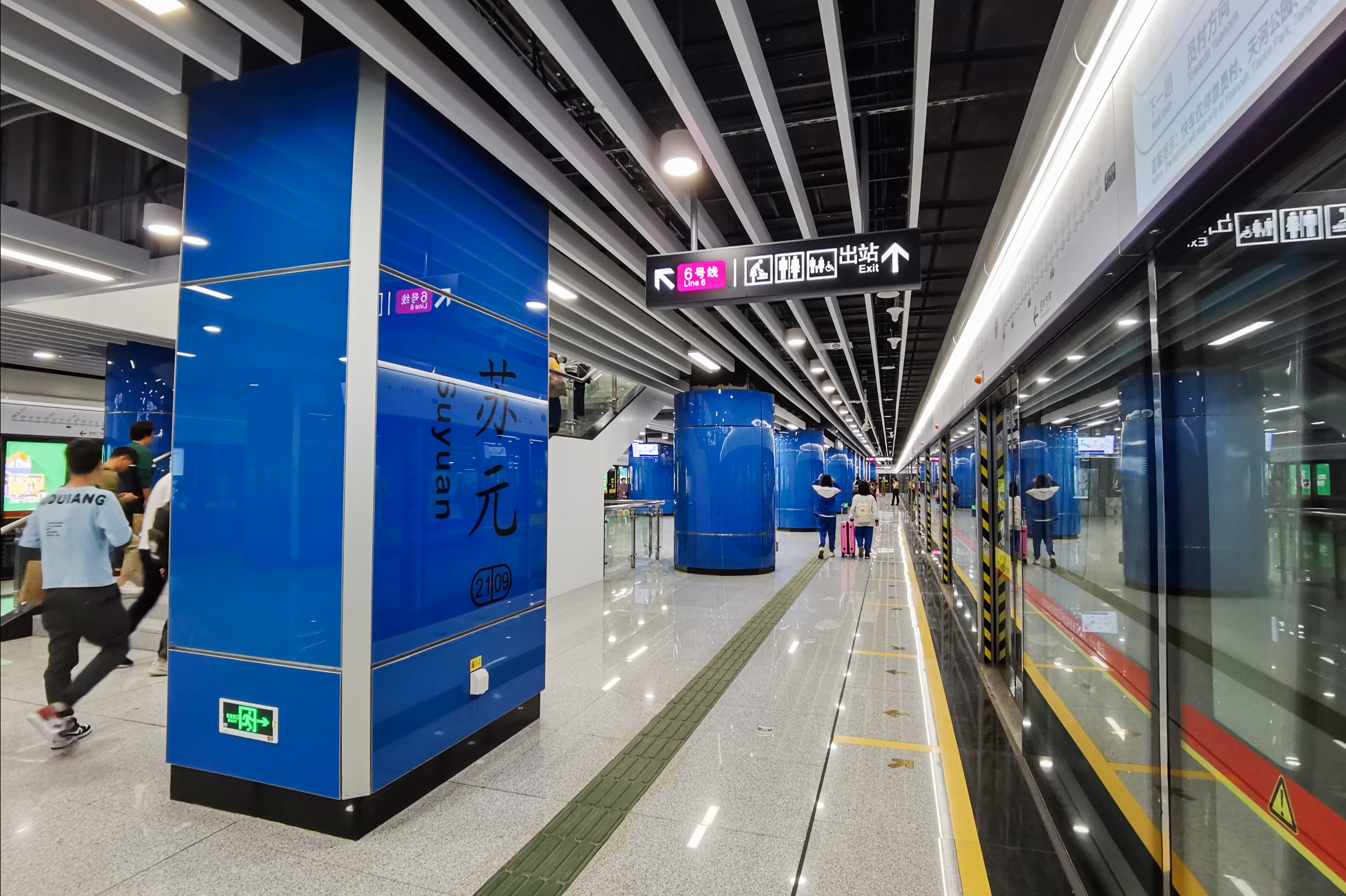
- Platform 4 (Line 21 towards Tianhe Park)

Chinese name
- Simplified Chinese: 苏元站
- Traditional Chinese: 蘇元站
Transcriptions
Standard Mandarin
- Hanyu Pinyin: Sūyuán Zhàn
Yue: Cantonese
- Jyutping: Sou^{1}jyun^{4} Zaam^{6}

General information
- Location: Kaichuang Avenue (开创大道) and Kefeng Road (科丰路) / Shuixi Road (水西路); Huangpu District, Guangzhou, Guangdong; China
- Operated by: Guangzhou Metro Co. Ltd.
- Lines: Line 6; Line 21
- Platforms: 4 (2 island platforms)
- Tracks: 4

Construction
- Structure type: Underground
- Accessible: Yes

Other information
- Station code: 630 2109

History
- Opened: 28 December 2016; 9 years ago (Line 6); 20 December 2019; 6 years ago (Line 21)

Services
Preceding station	Guangzhou Metro	Following station
Xiangang towards Xunfenggang	Line 6	Luogang towards Xiangxue
Science City towards Tianhe Park	Line 21	Shuixi towards Zengcheng Square
Shenzhoulu towards Tianhe Park	Line 21 Express	Shuixi towards Zengcheng Square
Location

Suyuan station (Chinese: 苏元站) is an interchange station between Line 6 and Line 21 of the Guangzhou Metro. The Line 6 station started operations on 28 December 2016, and the Line 21 station started operations on 20 December 2019.

The station has two underground island platforms, each for the respective lines.

== Station layout ==
B1; Concourse	Lobby	Ticket Machines, Customer Service, Police Station, Safety Facilities
B2; Platforms	Platform 2	6 towards Xunfenggang (Xiangang)
B2; Platforms	Island platform, doors will open on the left
B2; Platforms	Platform 1	6 towards Xiangxue (Luogang)
B2; Platforms	Transfer Passageway	Transfer passageway between Lines 6 & 21
B5; Platforms	Platform 4	21 towards Tianhe Park (Science City / express: Shenzhoulu)
B5; Platforms	Island platform, doors will open on the left
B5; Platforms	Platform 3	21 towards Zengcheng Square (Shuixi)

== Exits ==
There are 4 exits, lettered A, B, C and D. Exits A and B are accessible. Exit A is located on Shuixi Road, all others are on Kaichuang Avenue.

== Gallery ==
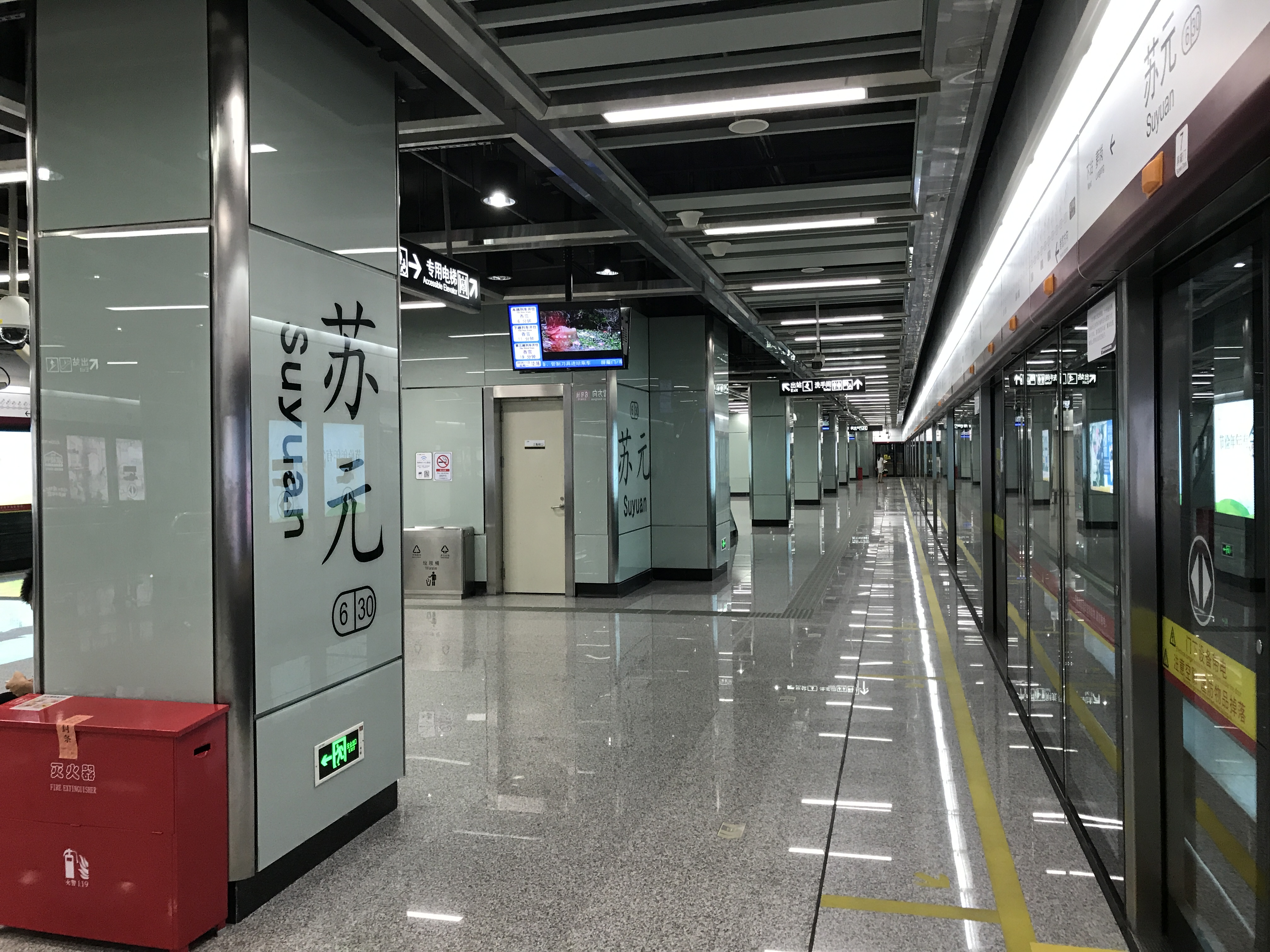
Platform 1 (Line 6 towards Xiangxue)

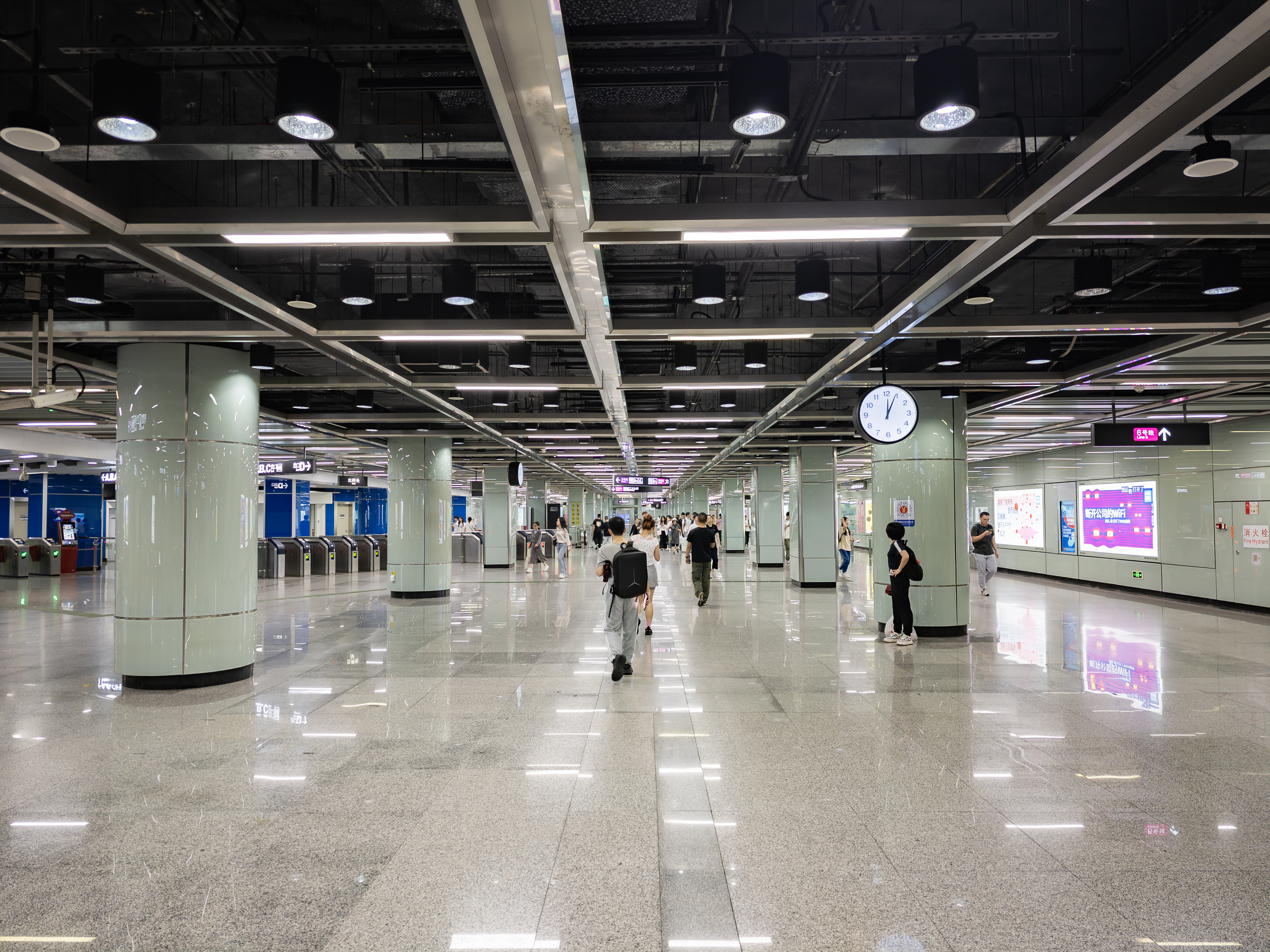
Line 6 Concourse

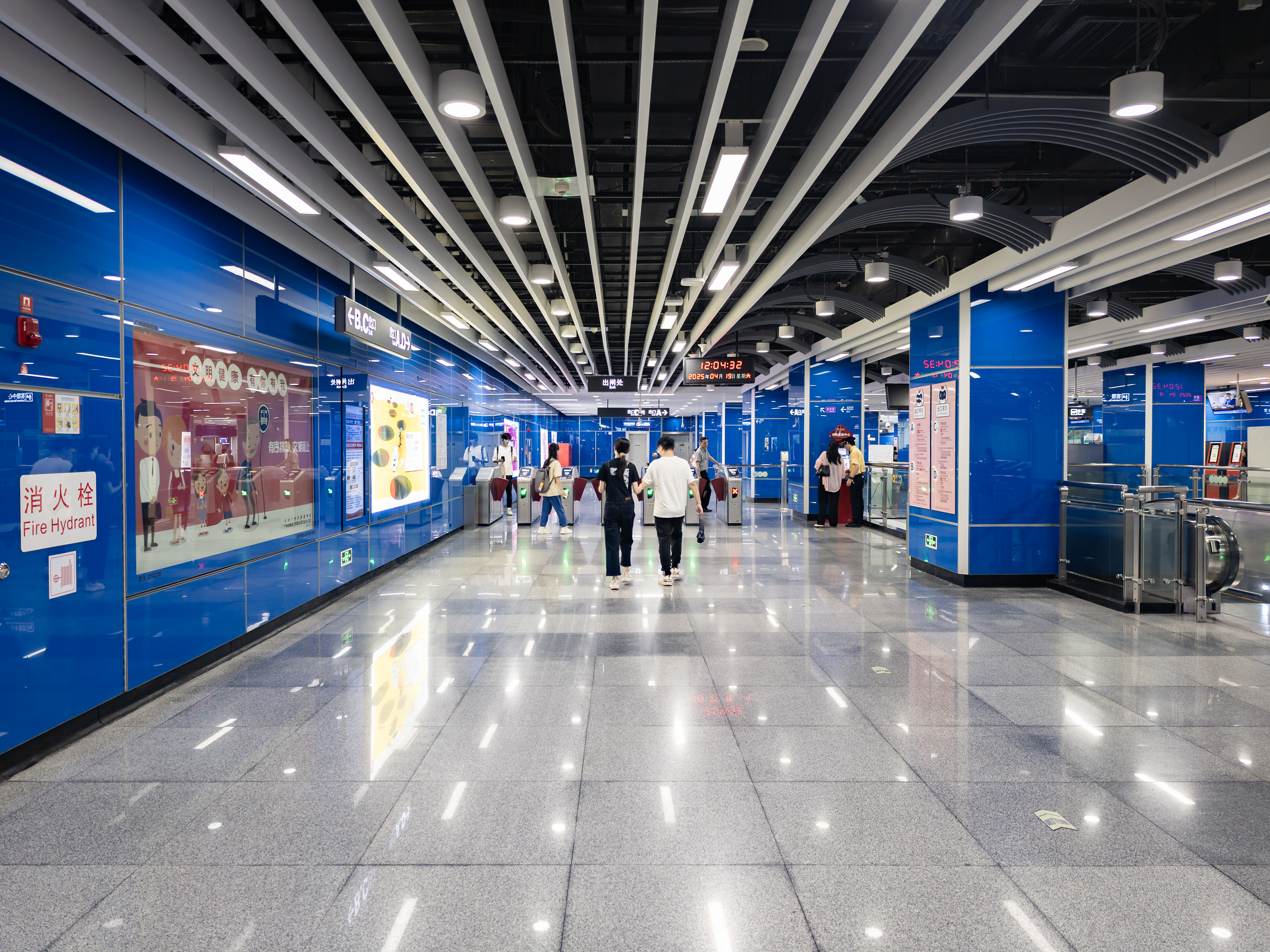
Line 21 Concourse

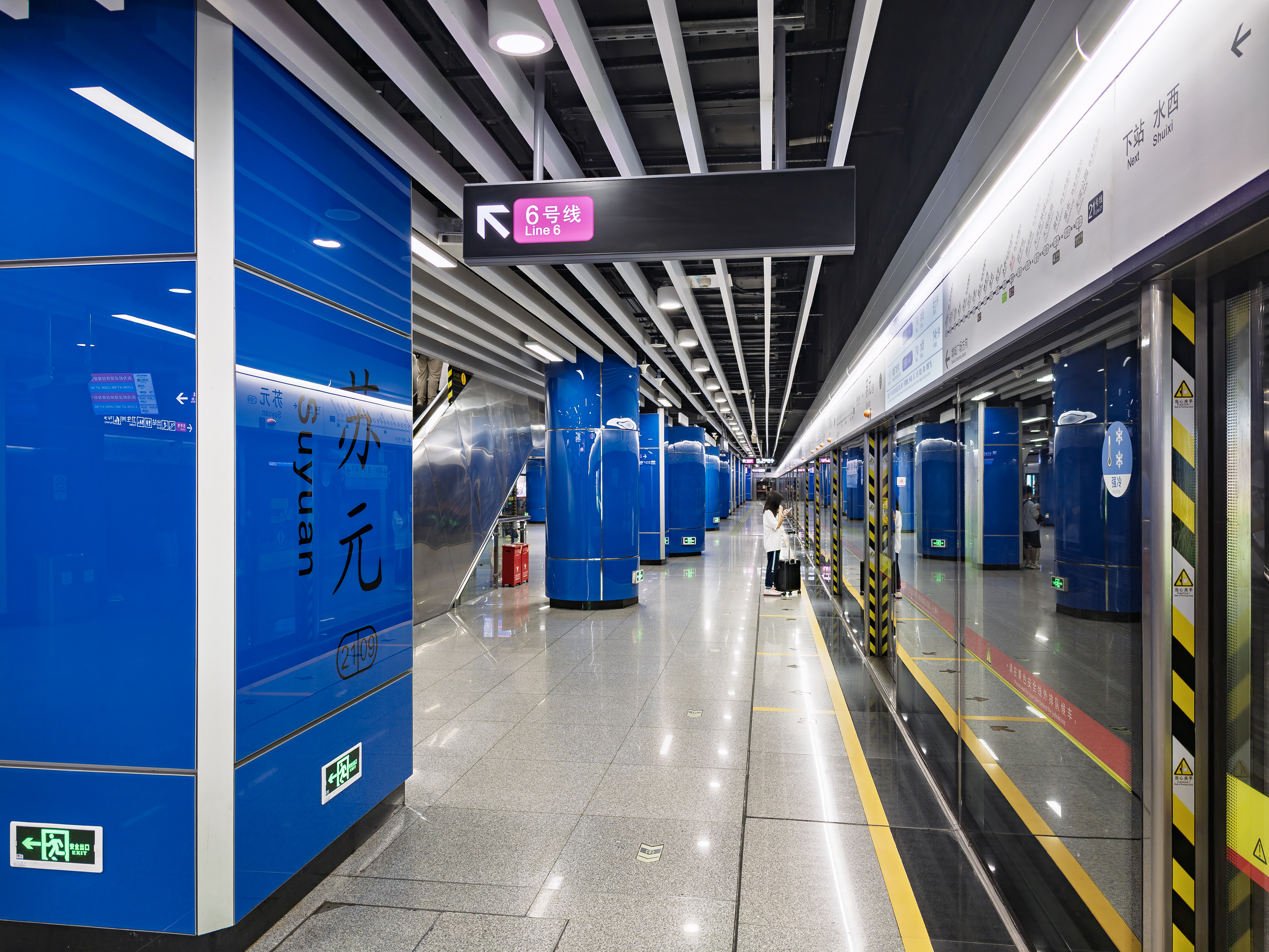
Platform 3 (Line 21 northbound platform)

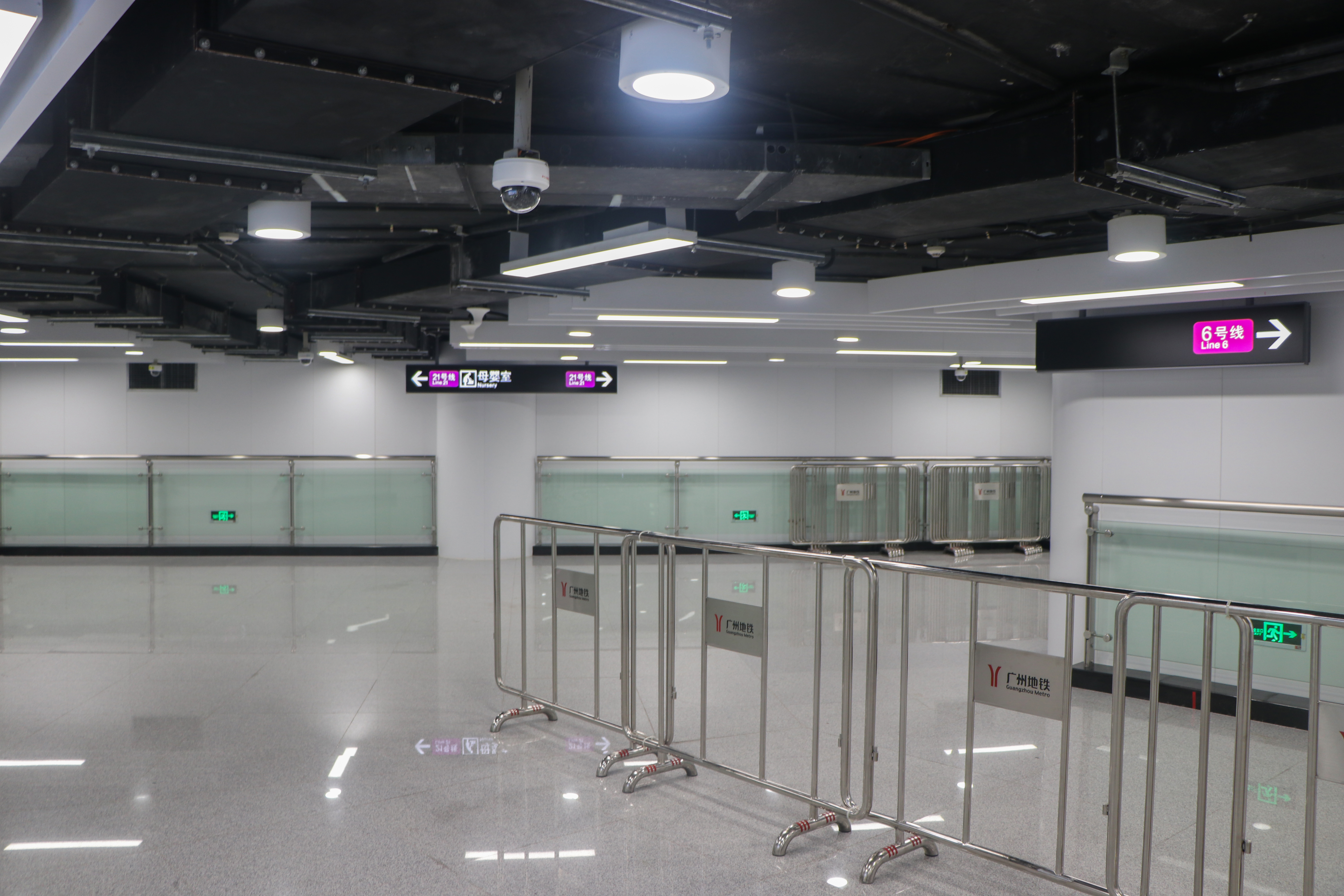
Transfer mezzanine
