= Line 21 (Guangzhou Metro) =

Express suburban line of the Guangzhou Metro

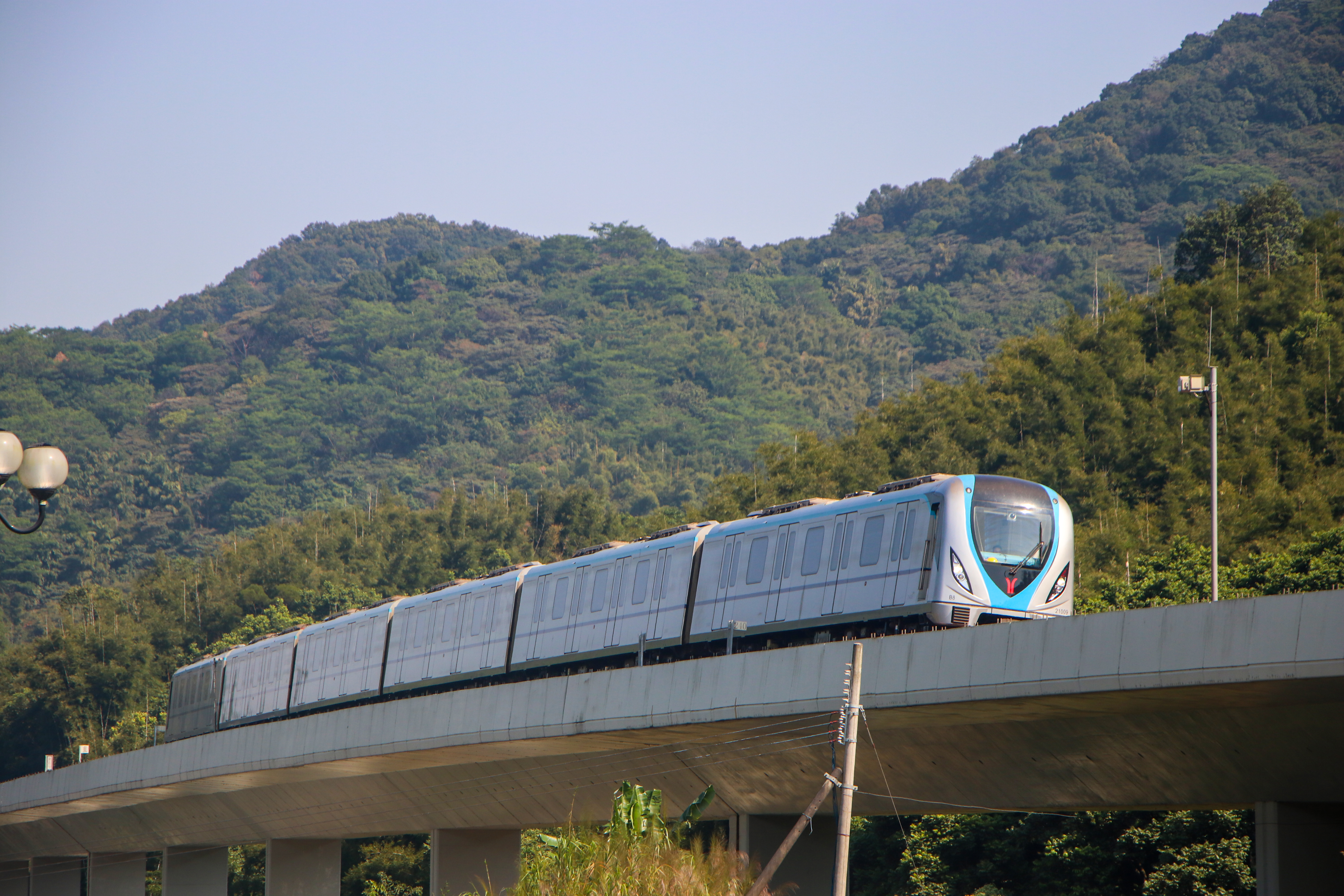
- Line 21 train near Jinkeng

Overview
- Other name(s): M21 (plan name); Eastern New Town express line (Chinese: 东部新城快线)
- Status: Operational
- Owner: City of Guangzhou
- Locale: Tianhe, Huangpu and Zengcheng districts Guangzhou, Guangdong
- Termini: Tianhe Park; Zengcheng Square
- Stations: 20

Service
- Type: Rapid transit
- System: Guangzhou Metro
- Services: 2
- Operator: Guangzhou Metro Corporation
- Daily ridership: 298,300 (2025 daily average)

History
- Opened: 28 December 2018; 7 years ago

Technical
- Line length: 60.3 km (37.5 mi)
- Track gauge: 1,435 mm (4 ft 8 1/2 in)
- Electrification: Third rail, 1,500 V DC (Overhead lines with same voltage installed in depot)
- Operating speed: 120 km/h (75 mph)

Line 21
- Simplified Chinese: 广州地铁21号线
- Traditional Chinese: 廣州地鐵21號線
Transcriptions
Standard Mandarin
- Hanyu Pinyin: Guǎngzhōu Dìtiě Èrshíyīhàoxiàn
Yue: Cantonese
- Jyutping: gwong^{2} zau^{1} dei^{6} tit^{3} ji^{6} sap^{6} jat^{1} hou^{6} sin^{3}

Line 21 of the Guangzhou Metro (Chinese: 广州地铁21号线; pinyin: Guǎngzhōu Dìtiě Èrshíyīhàoxiàn) is a rapid transit rail line in Guangzhou.

Line 21 is an express suburban metro line along with Line 14. Both lines were envisioned to connect and promote development in the northeast regions of Guangzhou. Line 21's unique role means that it has many design features that make it different from other Guangzhou metro lines. For example, several stations have passing loops to allow for express and local stopping patterns and trains reach a maximum service speed of 120 km/h (75 mph). These considerations allow for passengers to travel from outer Guangzhou to the city center in one hour. Line 21 runs from Tianhe Park in Tianhe to Zengcheng Square in Zengcheng. The line is about 60.3 km (37.5 mi) long. The line has 38.8 km (24.1 mi) of underground sections, 6.8 km (4.2 mi) of mountain base tunneling and 14.7 km (9.1 mi) on viaducts. The line has a total of 20 stations, of which 16 are underground and 4 are elevated.

The eastern section of Line 21 opened on 28 December 2018 and the western section opened on 20 December 2019.

Since 2 October 2024, the section from Tianhe Park to Yuancun was removed from Line 21, and after renovation was completed, it was transferred to Line 11. Cross platform transfer has been provided at Tianhe Park station since 28 December 2024.

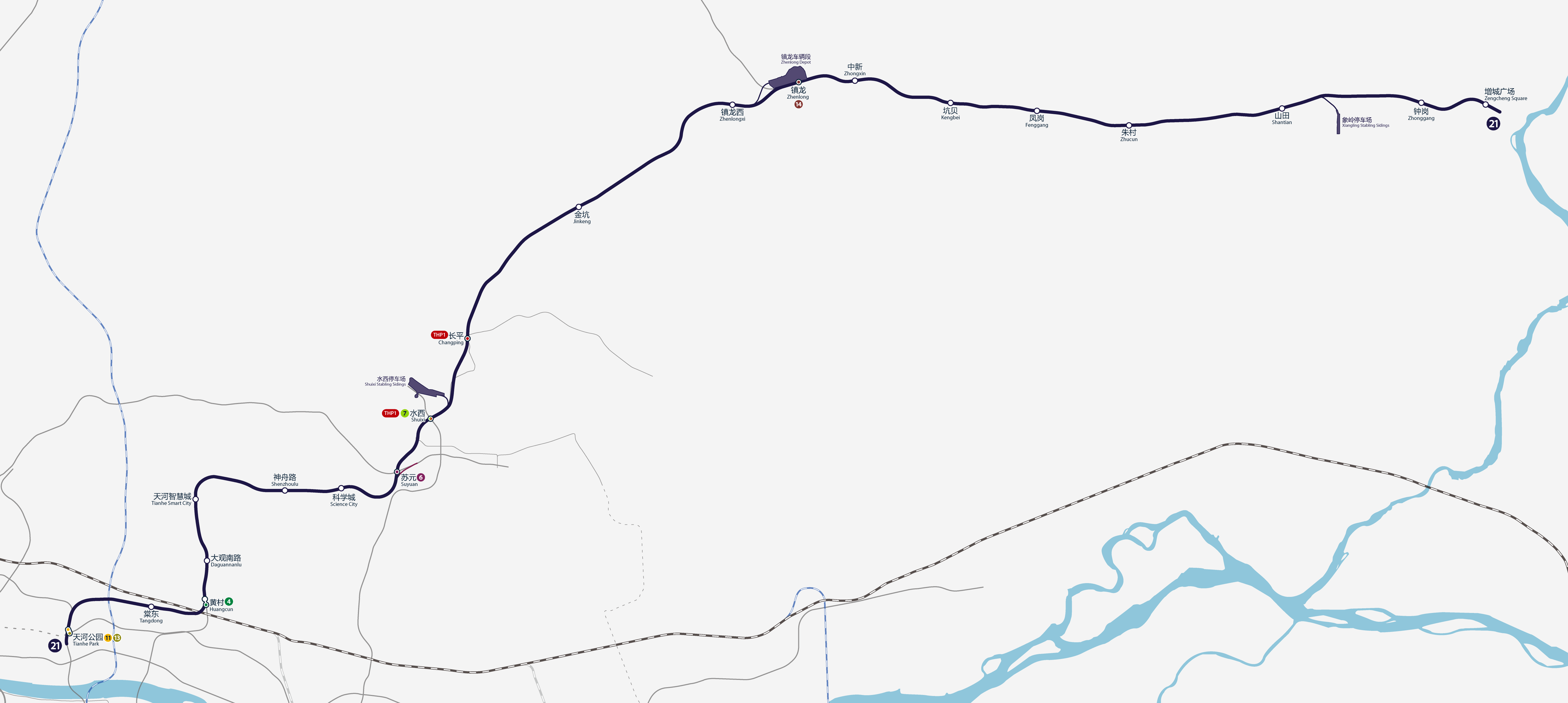
Line 21 drawn to scale.

== Opening timeline ==
| Segment | Commencement | Length | Station(s) | Name |
|---|---|---|---|---|
| Zhenlongxi — Zengcheng Square | 28 December 2018 | 26.2 km (16.3 mi) | 9 | Eastern section |
| Yuancun — Zhenlongxi | 20 December 2019 | 35.3 km (21.9 mi) | 12 | Western section |
| Yuancun — Tianhe Park (closed) | 2 October 2024 | −1.37 km (−0.9 mi) | -1 | Converting to Line 11 section per initial design |

== Train service ==
There are 2 types of train services offered on Line 21:

- Tianhe Park — Zengcheng Square (Local services, stop at every stations on mainline)
- Tianhe Park — Zengcheng Square (Rapid express services, only stop at Tangdong, Huangcun, Tianhe Smart City, Shenzhoulu, Suyuan, Shuixi, Zhenlong, Fenggang, Zengcheng Square)

== Stations ==
- L - local services
- R - rapid express services

| R | L | Station No. | Station name | | Connections | Distance km | | Location |
| R | L | Station No. | English | Chinese | Connections | Distance km | | Location |
|---|---|---|---|---|---|---|---|---|
| ● | ● | 2102 | Tianhe Park | 天河公园 | 11 1104 13 1320 | 0 | 0 | Tianhe |
| ● | ● | 2103 | Tangdong | 棠东 | | 3.41 | 3.41 | Tianhe |
| ● | ● | 2104 | Huangcun | 黄村 | 4 424; JSQ | 2.13 | 5.54 | Tianhe |
| ｜ | ● | 2105 | Daguannanlu | 大观南路 | | 1.16 | 6.70 | Tianhe |
| ● | ● | 2106 | Tianhe Smart City | 天河智慧城 | | 2.08 | 8.78 | Tianhe |
| ● | ● | 2107 | Shenzhoulu | 神舟路 | | 3.27 | 12.05 | Huangpu |
| ｜ | ● | 2108 | Science City | 科学城 | | 1.99 | 14.04 | Huangpu |
| ● | ● | 2109 | Suyuan | 苏元 | 6 630 | 2.45 | 16.49 | Huangpu |
| ● | ● | 2110 | Shuixi | 水西 | 7 719; THP1 THP106 | 2.31 | 18.80 | Huangpu |
| ｜ | ● | 2111 | Changping | 长平 | THP1 THP110 | 3.00 | 21.80 | Huangpu |
| ｜ | ● | 2112 | Jinkeng | 金坑 | | 6.27 | 28.07 | Huangpu |
| ｜ | ● | 2113 | Zhenlongxi | 镇龙西 | | 5.94 | 34.01 | Huangpu |
| ● | ● | 2114 | Zhenlong | 镇龙 | 14 (branch) 1430; ZEA SS | 2.17 | 36.18 | Huangpu |
| ｜ | ● | 2115 | Zhongxin | 中新 | | 2.12 | 38.30 | Zengcheng |
| ｜ | ● | 2116 | Kengbei | 坑贝 | | 3.59 | 41.89 | Zengcheng |
| ● | ● | 2117 | Fenggang | 凤岗 | | 2.54 | 44.43 | Zengcheng |
| ｜ | ● | 2118 | Zhucun | 朱村 | | 3.24 | 47.67 | Zengcheng |
| ｜ | ● | 2119 | Shantian | 山田 | | 4.46 | 52.13 | Zengcheng |
| ｜ | ● | 2120 | Zhonggang | 钟岗 | | 4.95 | 57.08 | Zengcheng |
| ● | ● | 2121 | Zengcheng Square | 增城广场 | | 2.95 | 60.03 | Zengcheng |
