= Science City station (Guangzhou Metro) =

Metro station in Guangzhou, China

Science City 科学城
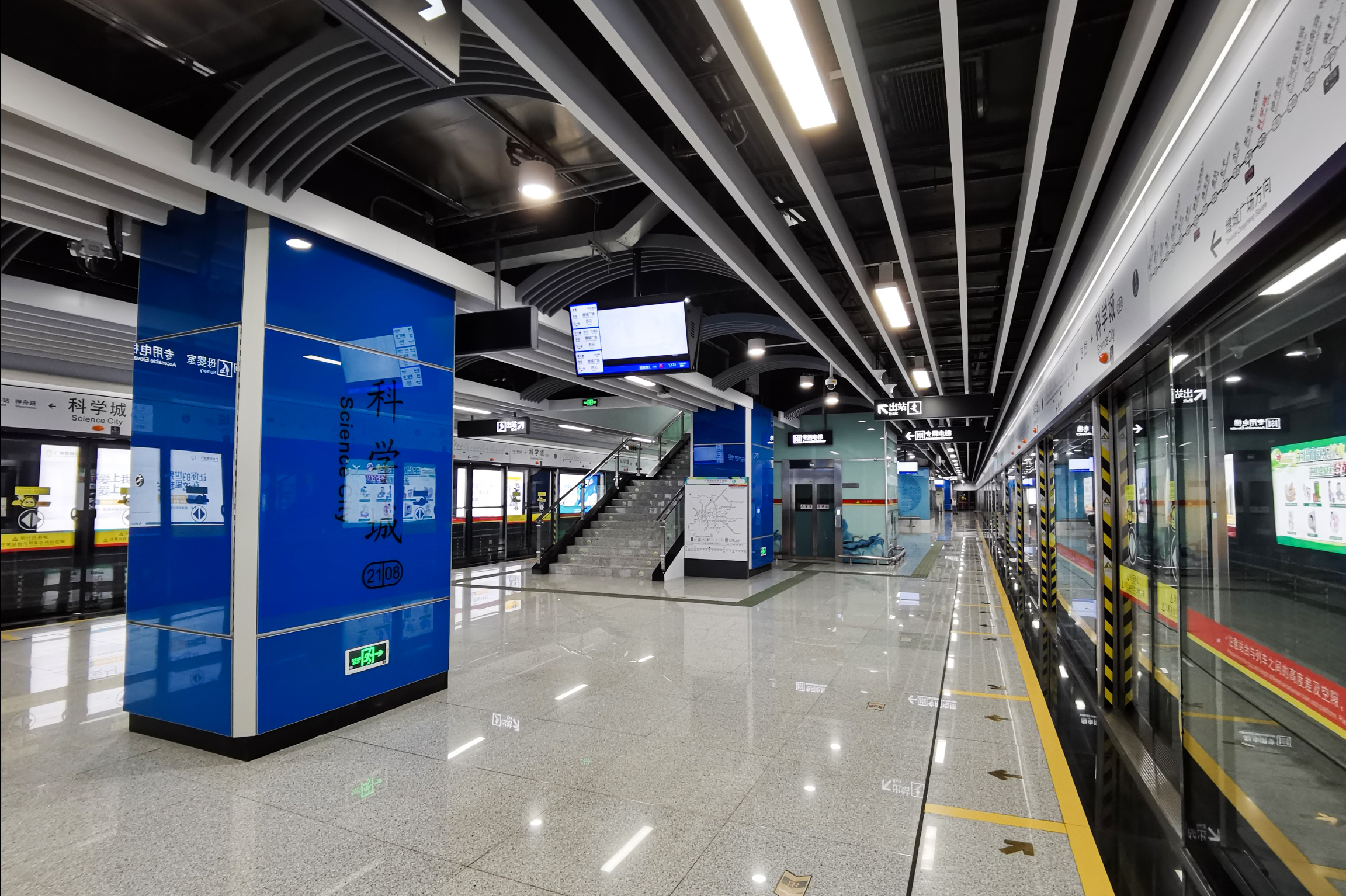
- Platform

Chinese name
- Simplified Chinese: 科学城站
- Traditional Chinese: 科學城站
Transcriptions

General information
- Location: Kexue Avenue × Kaitai Avenue; Huangpu District, Guangzhou, Guangdong; China
- Coordinates: 23°10′06″N 113°26′39″E
- Operated by: Guangzhou Metro Co. Ltd.
- Line: Line 21
- Platforms: 2 (1 island platform)
- Tracks: 2

Construction
- Structure type: Underground
- Accessible: Yes

Other information
- Station code: 2108

History
- Opened: 20 December 2019; 6 years ago

Services
Preceding station	Guangzhou Metro	Following station
Shenzhoulu towards Tianhe Park	Line 21	Suyuan towards Zengcheng Square
Location

Science City station (Chinese: 科学城站) is a station of Line 21 of the Guangzhou Metro. It started operations on 20 December 2019.

== Exits ==
There are 3 exits, lettered A1, B1 and C1. Exit C1 is accessible. Exits A1 and B1 are located on Kexue (Science) Avenue, whilst exit C1 is located on Kaitai Avenue.

== Gallery ==
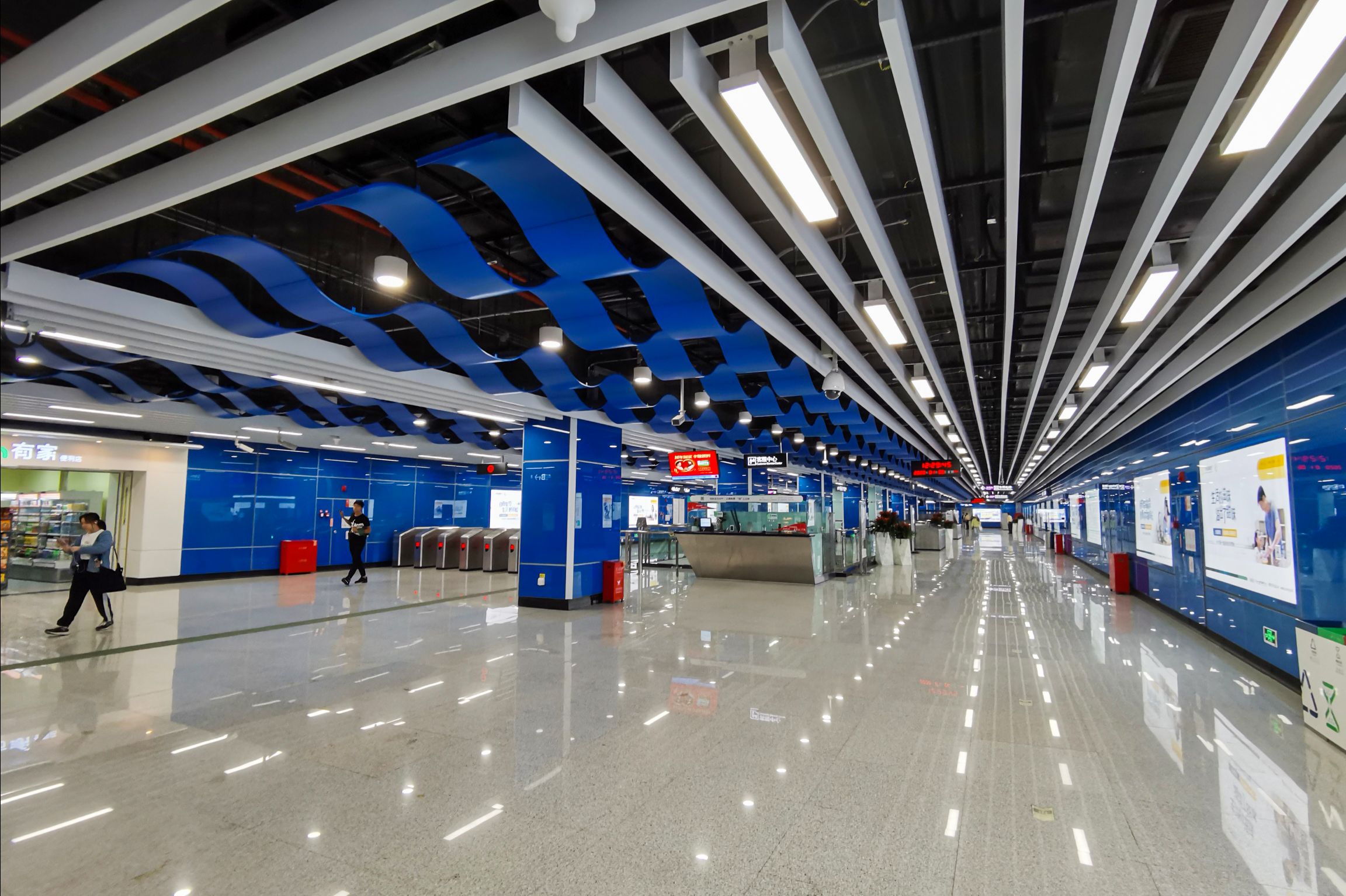
Concourse

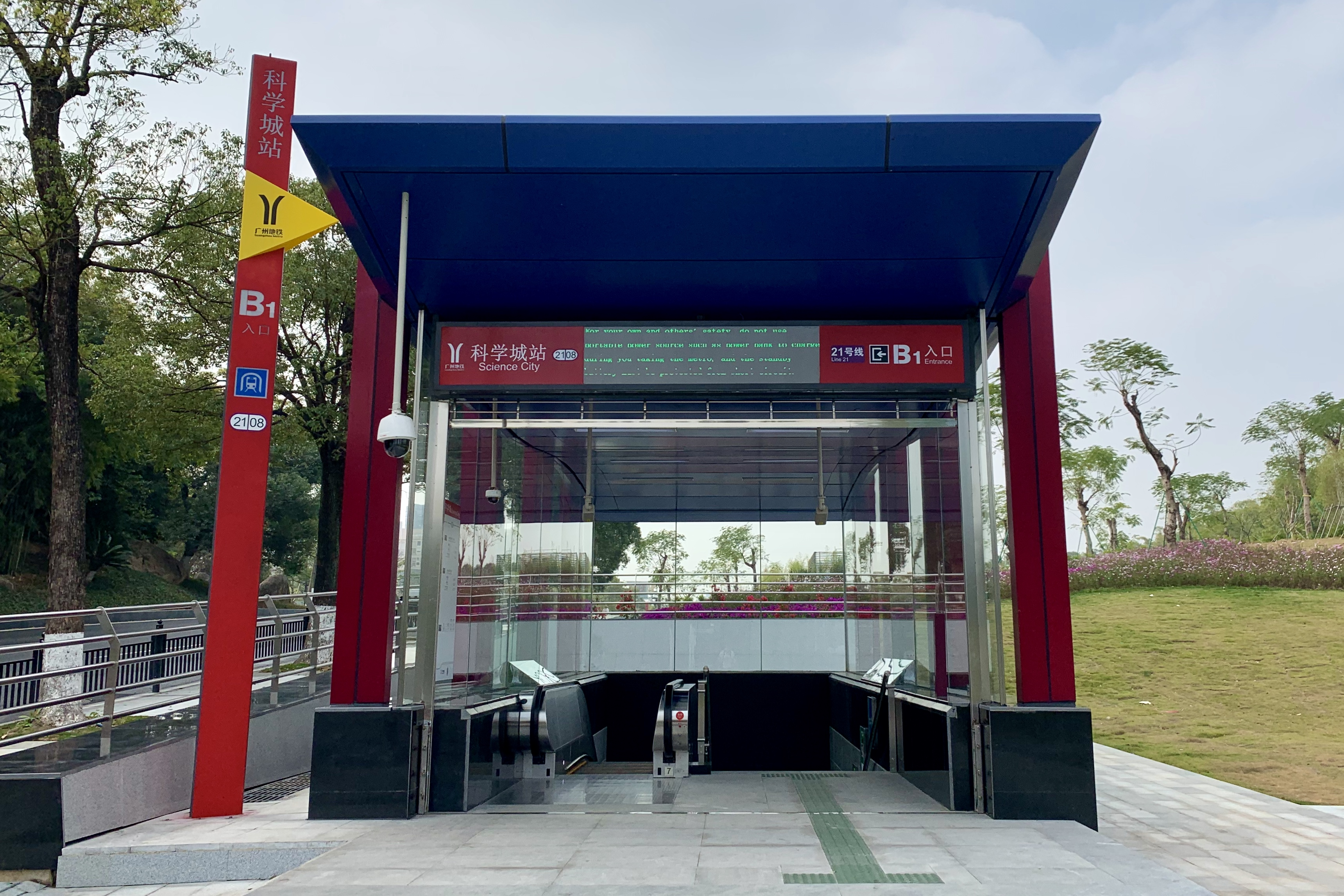
Exit B1

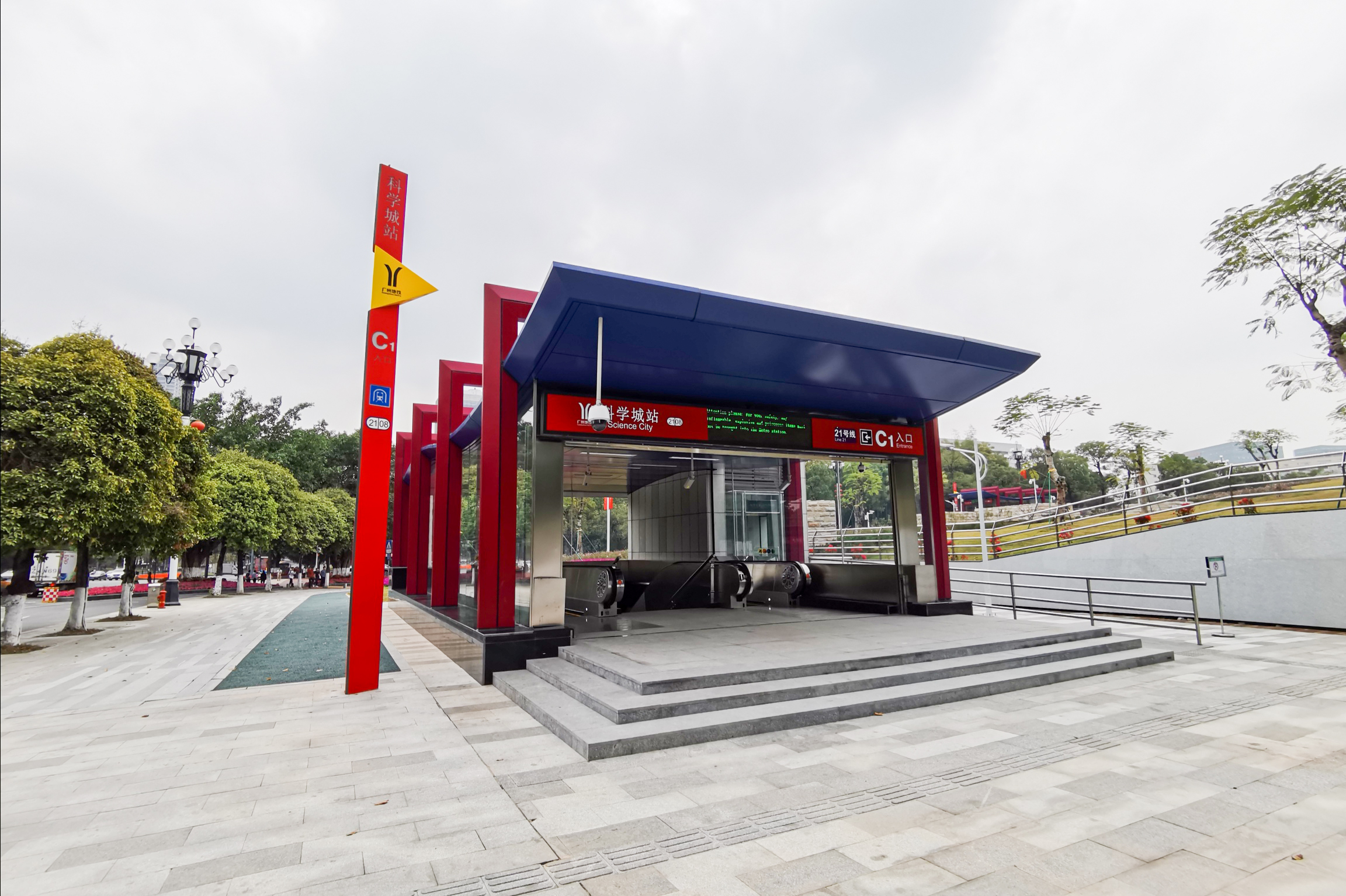
Exit C1
