= Shantian station =

Metro station in Guangzhou, China

Coordinates: 23.27913°N 113.7395°E

Shantian 山田
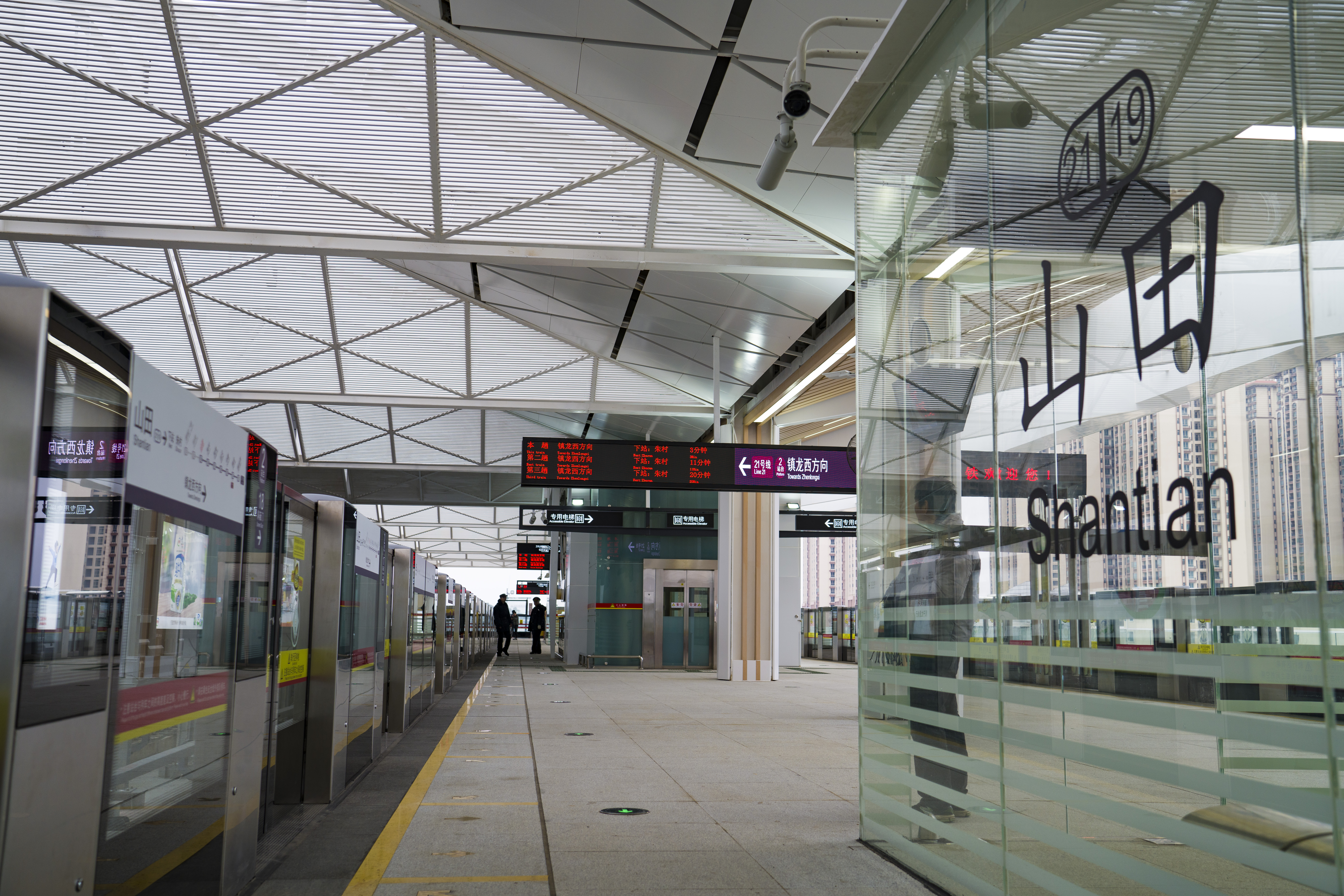
- Platform 2

Chinese name
- Simplified Chinese: 山田站
- Traditional Chinese: 山田站
Transcriptions
Yue: Cantonese
- Jyutping: saan^{1}tin^{4}zaam^{6}

General information
- Location: Zhucun Avenue East (G324), Zengcheng District, Guangzhou, Guangdong; China
- Owner: Guangzhou Metro Co. Ltd.
- Operator: Guangzhou Metro Co. Ltd.
- Line: Line 21
- Platforms: 4 (2 island platforms)
- Tracks: 4

Construction
- Structure type: Elevated
- Accessible: Yes

Other information
- Station code: 2119

History
- Opened: 28 December 2018; 7 years ago

Services
Preceding station	Guangzhou Metro	Following station
Zhucun towards Tianhe Park	Line 21	Zhonggang towards Zengcheng Square
Location

Shantian station (Chinese: 山田站) is an elevated station of Line 21 of the Guangzhou Metro. It started operations on 28 December 2018.

== Station layout ==
The station has 2 elevated island platforms. Trains usually stop at the middle 2 platforms (platforms 1 and 2), with the express trains also passing through the middle tracks.

== Exits ==
There are 4 exits, lettered A, B, C and D. Exit A is accessible. All exits are located on Guangxian Highway.

== History ==
This station was named Xiangling Station during the planning and construction. In March 2018, Guangzhou Metro Group declared the names of stations along Line 21 to the Place Names Committee of the Guangzhou Civil Affairs Bureau, and finally decided to use Shantian Station as the official name of the station.

At 12:28 p.m. on 28 December 2018, the station opened with the opening of the first section of Line 21.

== Gallery ==
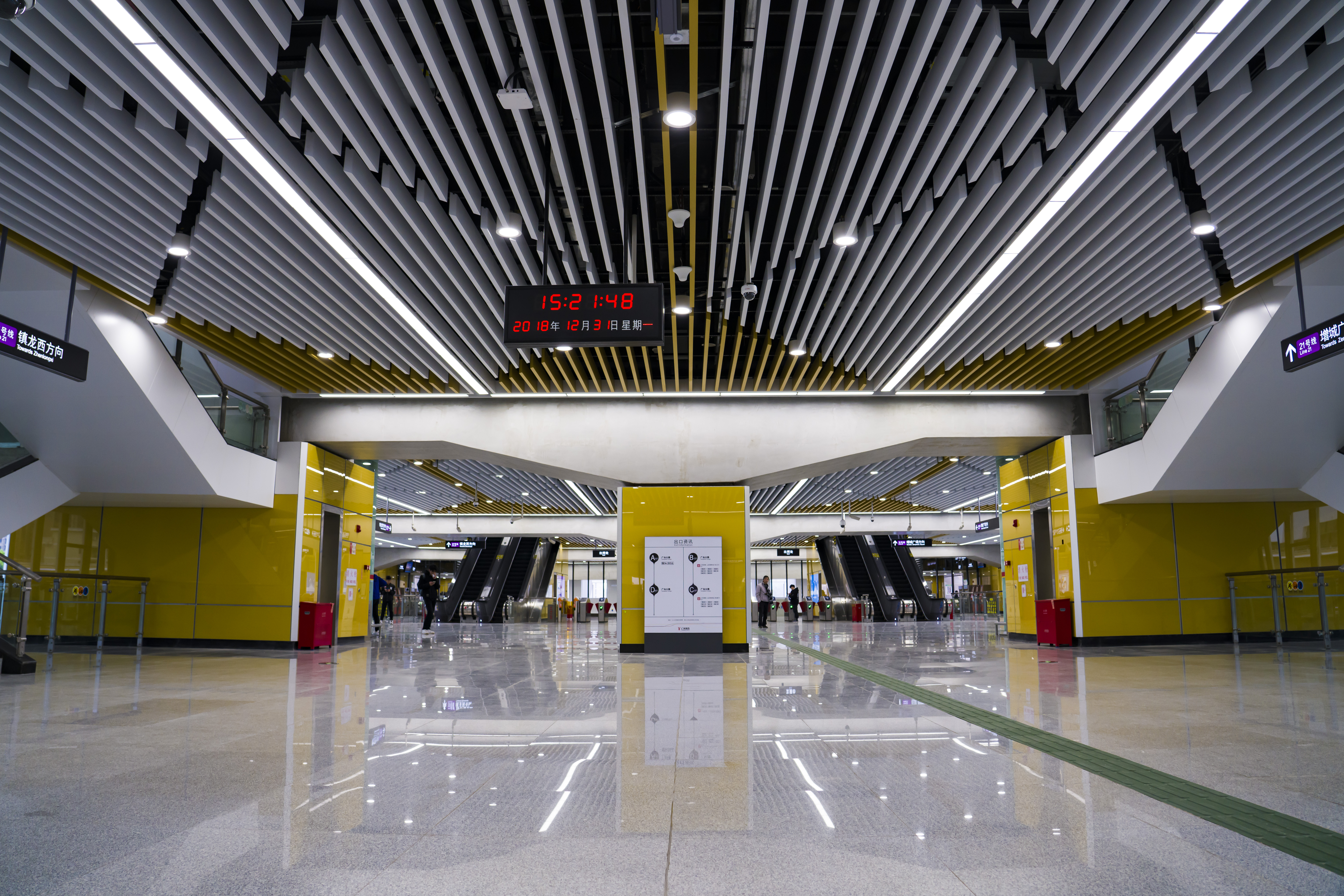
Concourse

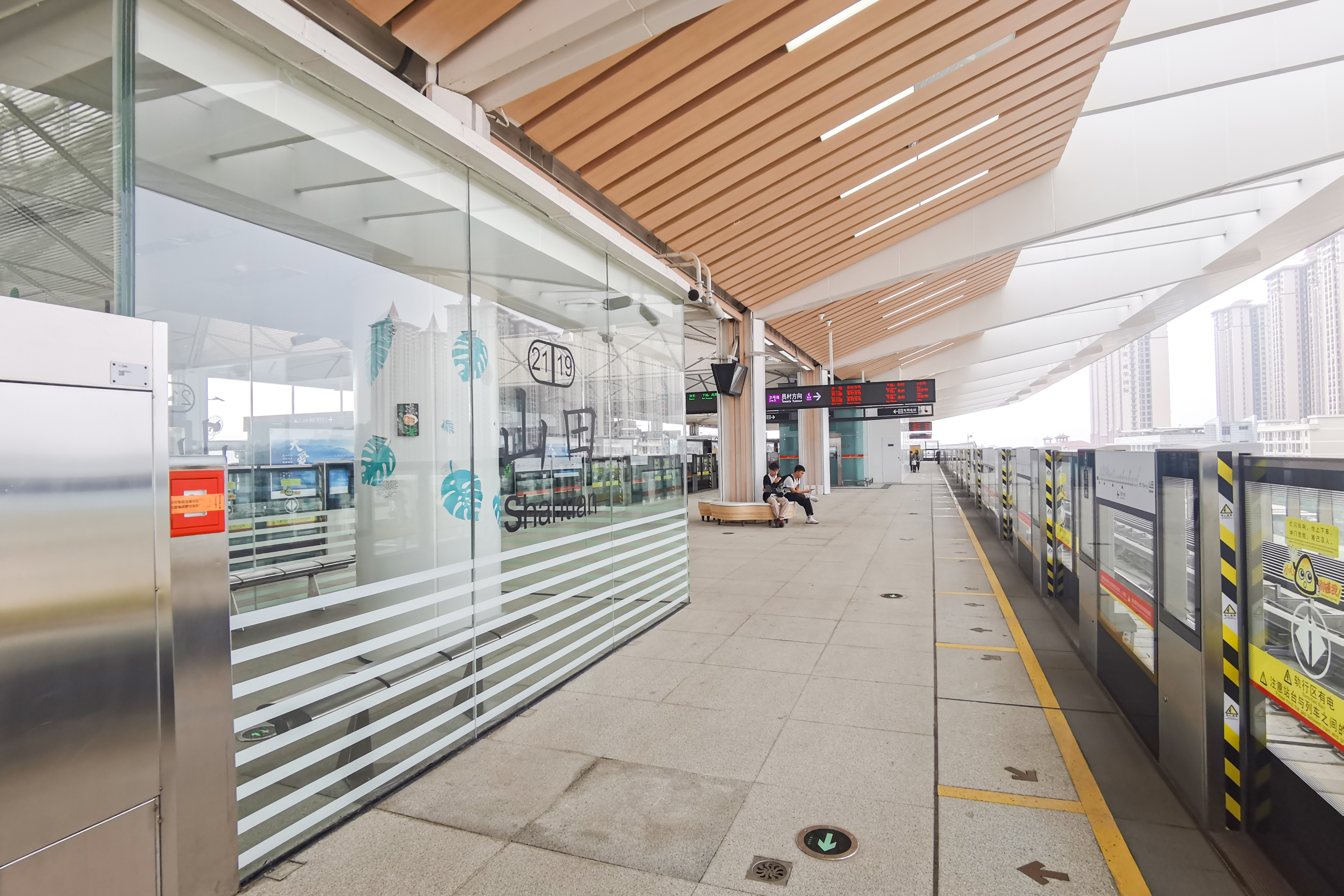
Platform 4

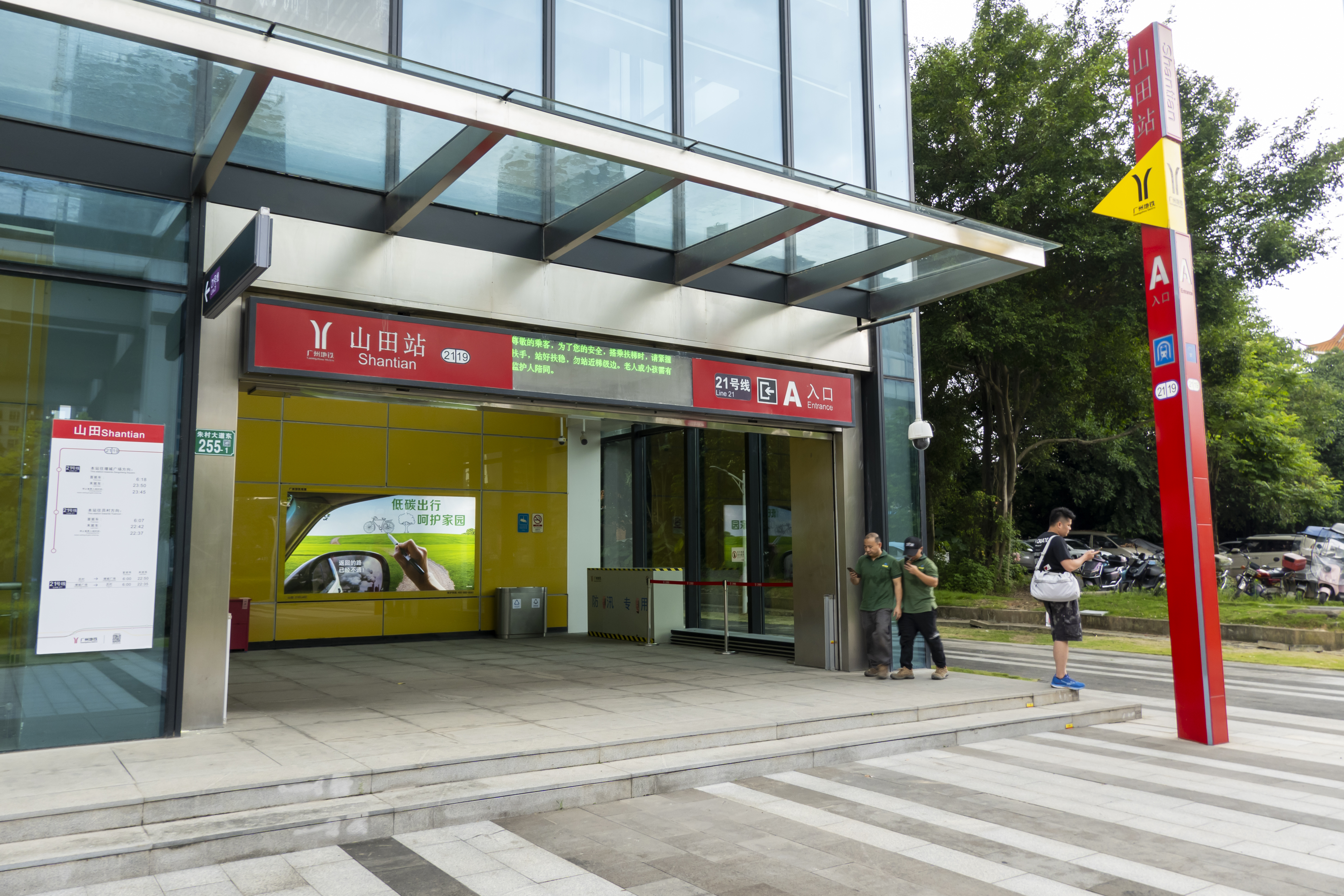
Exit A
