= Shenzhoulu station =

Guangzhou Metro station

Shenzhoulu 神舟路
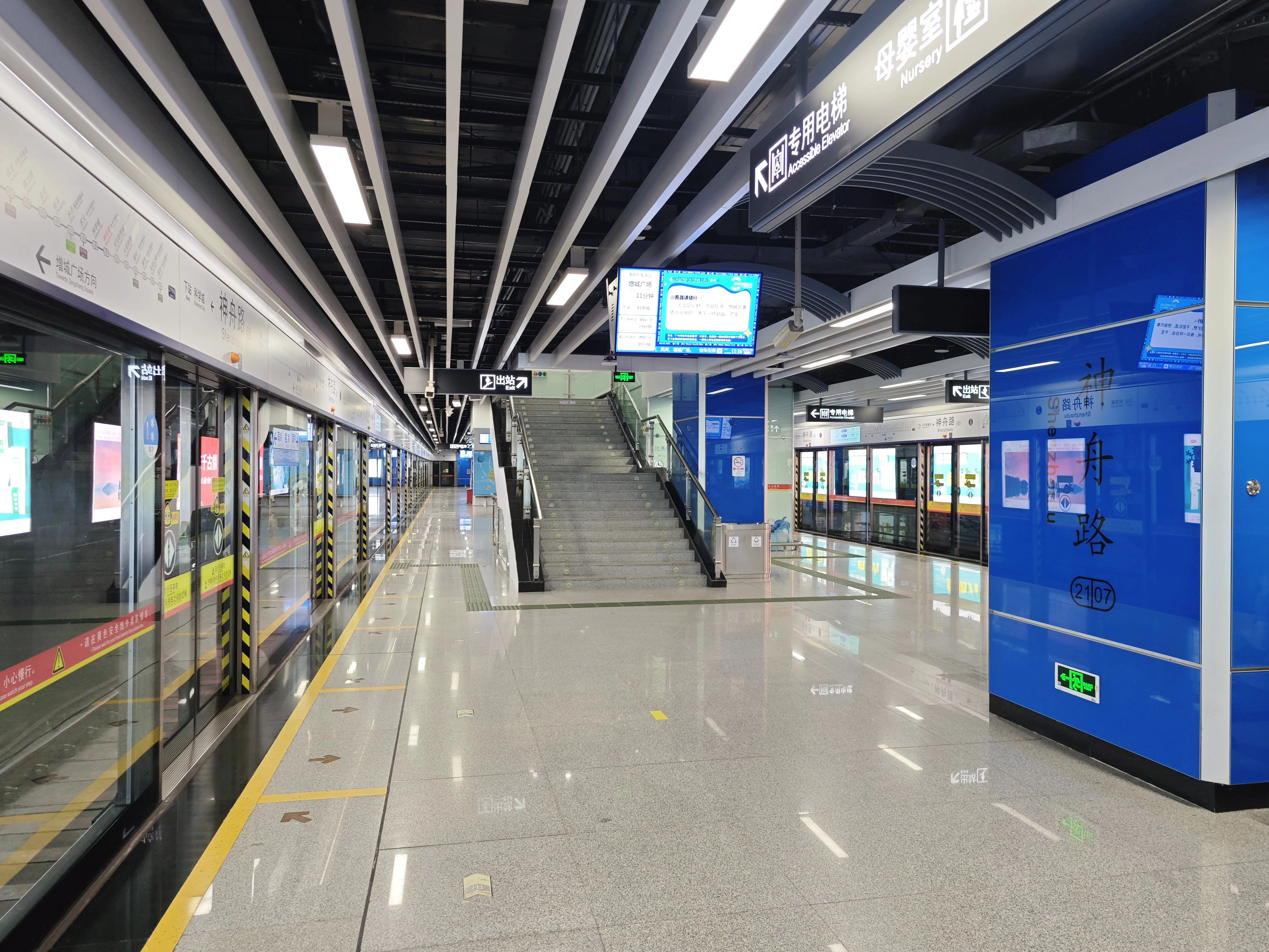
- Platform 1

Chinese name
- Simplified Chinese: 神舟路站
- Traditional Chinese: 神舟路站
Transcriptions

General information
- Location: West side of the junction of Kexue Avenue (科学大道) and Shenzhou Road (神舟路); Huangpu District, Guangzhou, Guangdong; China
- Coordinates: 23°17′04″N 113°35′35″E
- Operated by: Guangzhou Metro Co. Ltd.
- Line: Line 21
- Platforms: 2 (1 island platform)
- Tracks: 2

Construction
- Structure type: Underground
- Accessible: Yes

Other information
- Station code: 2107

History
- Opened: 20 December 2019; 6 years ago

Services
Preceding station	Guangzhou Metro	Following station
Tianhe Smart City towards Tianhe Park	Line 21	Science City towards Zengcheng Square
Tianhe Smart City towards Tianhe Park	Line 21 Express	Suyuan towards Zengcheng Square
Location

Shenzhoulu station (Chinese: 神舟路站; pinyin: Shénzhōulù zhàn) is a station of Line 21 on the Guangzhou Metro. It started operations on 20 December 2019.

== Exits ==
There are 2 exits, lettered A and B. Exit B is accessible. Both exits are located on Kexue (Science) Avenue.

== Gallery ==
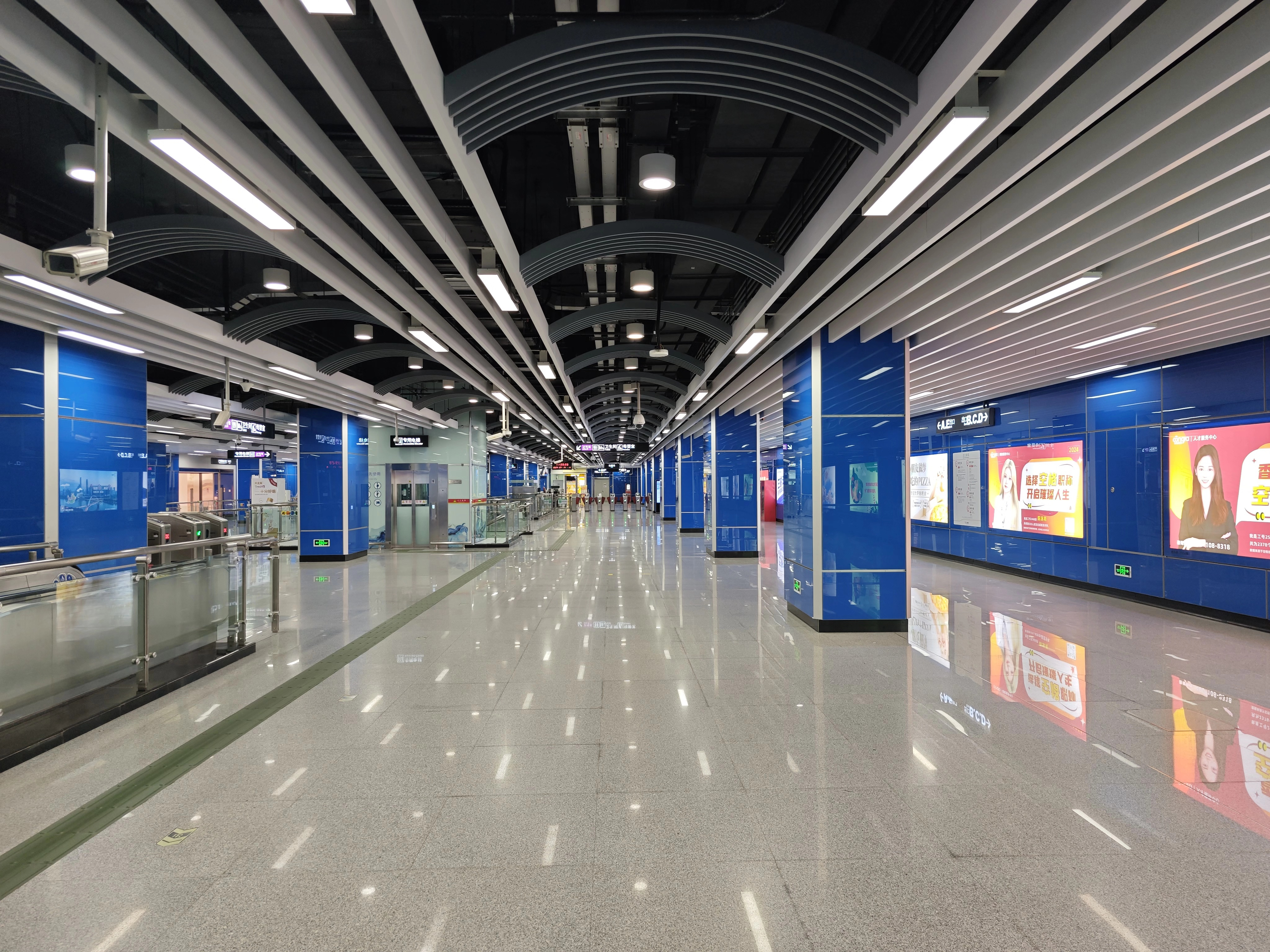
Concourse

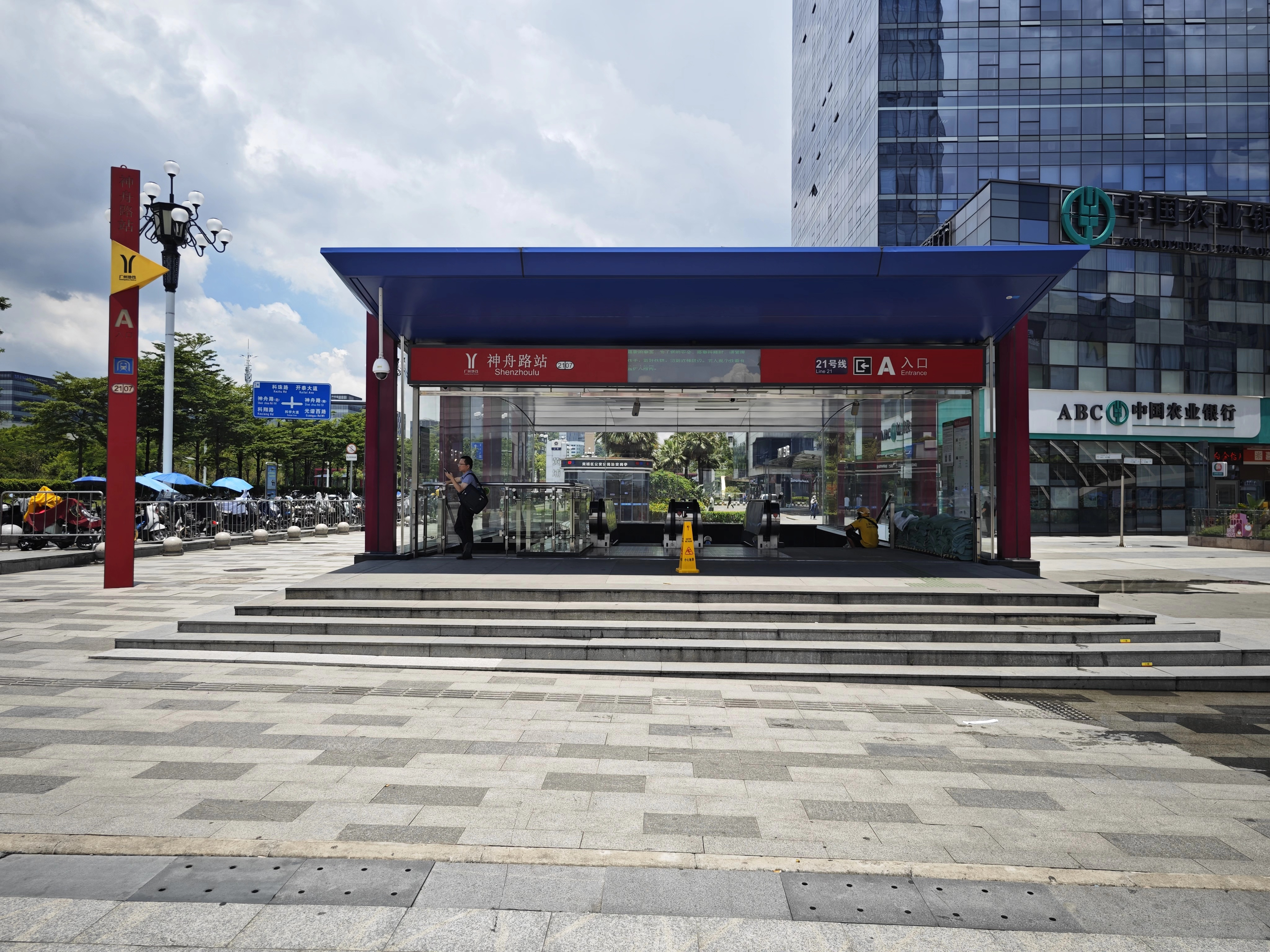
Exit A

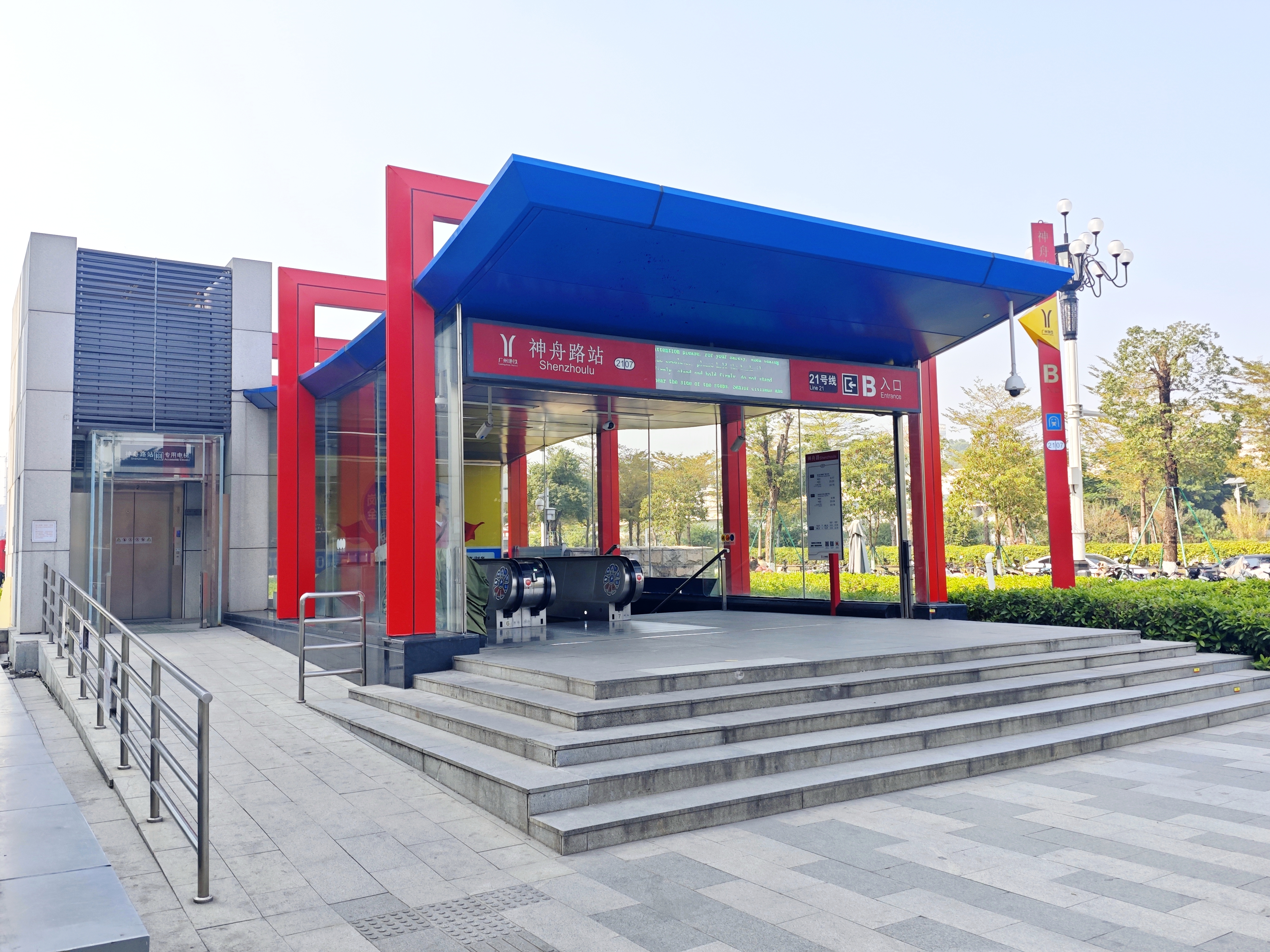
Exit B

== Operational accident ==
At around 13:00 on July 30, 2021, short-term heavy rainfall occurred in Guangzhou. The ground retaining wall of a reserved exit under construction collapsed, causing ground water to flow into the station through the exit. The subway company immediately terminated the service between Huangcun station and Suyuan station. All passengers stranded in the station were evacuated without causing casualties. After that, the water inlet was also blocked. During the period, the subway company also arranged for shuttle buses to walk thought the two stations. At 19:15, the subway company announced that the blocked section open for service, but the station still suspends operations, and the train passes through the station without stopping. At 20:00 that day, the station resumed operations. The accident attracted attention due to the serious flooding of Zhengzhou Metro Line 5 that occurred before. After the investigation, it was confirmed that a retaining wall that did not meet the quality requirements was built illegally for the construction site near the exit. The water retaining wall collapsed during the heavy rain, causing water into the exit. Relevant management personnel were subject to administrative punishment or disciplinary action within the Party.
