= Luogang, Guangzhou =

Former district of Guangzhou, China

Luogang 萝岗区
- District of the China
- 2005–2014
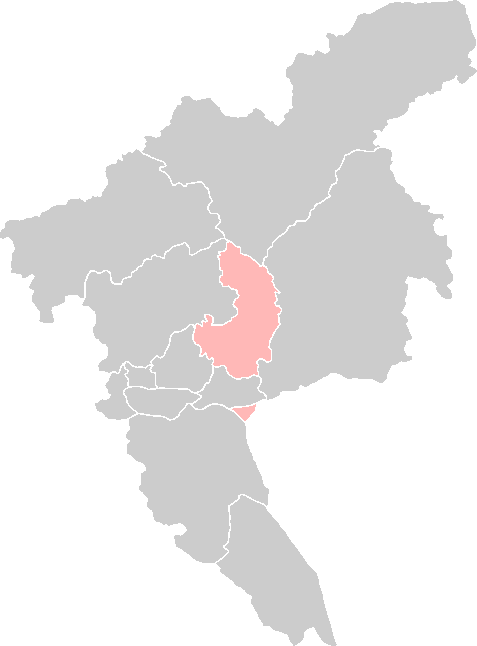
- Location of Luogang in Guangzhou.
- History
  - Established: 2005
  - Disestablished: 2014
Preceded by
Baiyun District, Guangzhou
Huangpu District, Guangzhou
Tianhe District, Guangzhou
Zengcheng City, Guangzhou
Succeeded by
Huangpu District, Guangzhou
- Today part of: Part of Huangpu District, Guangzhou

Luogang, Guangzhou
- Simplified Chinese: 萝岗区
- Traditional Chinese: 蘿崗區
- Jyutping: Lo4gong1 Keoi1
- Hanyu Pinyin: Luógǎng Qū
Transcriptions
Standard Mandarin
- Hanyu Pinyin: Luógǎng Qū
Yue: Cantonese
- Yale Romanization: Lòhgōng Kēui
- Jyutping: Lo4gong1 Keoi1
- Canton Romanization: lo4 gong1 kêu1
- IPA: [lɔ˩.kɔŋ˥]

Luogang District is a former district of Guangzhou, the capital of Guangdong province, China. It was merged into Huangpu District on 12 February 2014.

== Administrative divisions ==
Subdistricts

- Luogang Subdistrict (萝岗街道), Xiagang Subdistrict (夏港街道), Dongqu Subdistrict (东区街道), Lianhe Subdistrict (联和街道), Yonghe Subdistrict (永和街道)

The only town is Jiulong (九龙镇)

== Education ==
The middle and high school campus of the American International School of Guangzhou is in Science Park (科学城; 科學城; Kēxuéchéng; fo1 hok6 sing4) in the former Luogang District.
