= Baiyun Culture Square station =

Guangzhou Metro Line 2 and Line 12 station

Baiyun Culture Square 白云文化广场
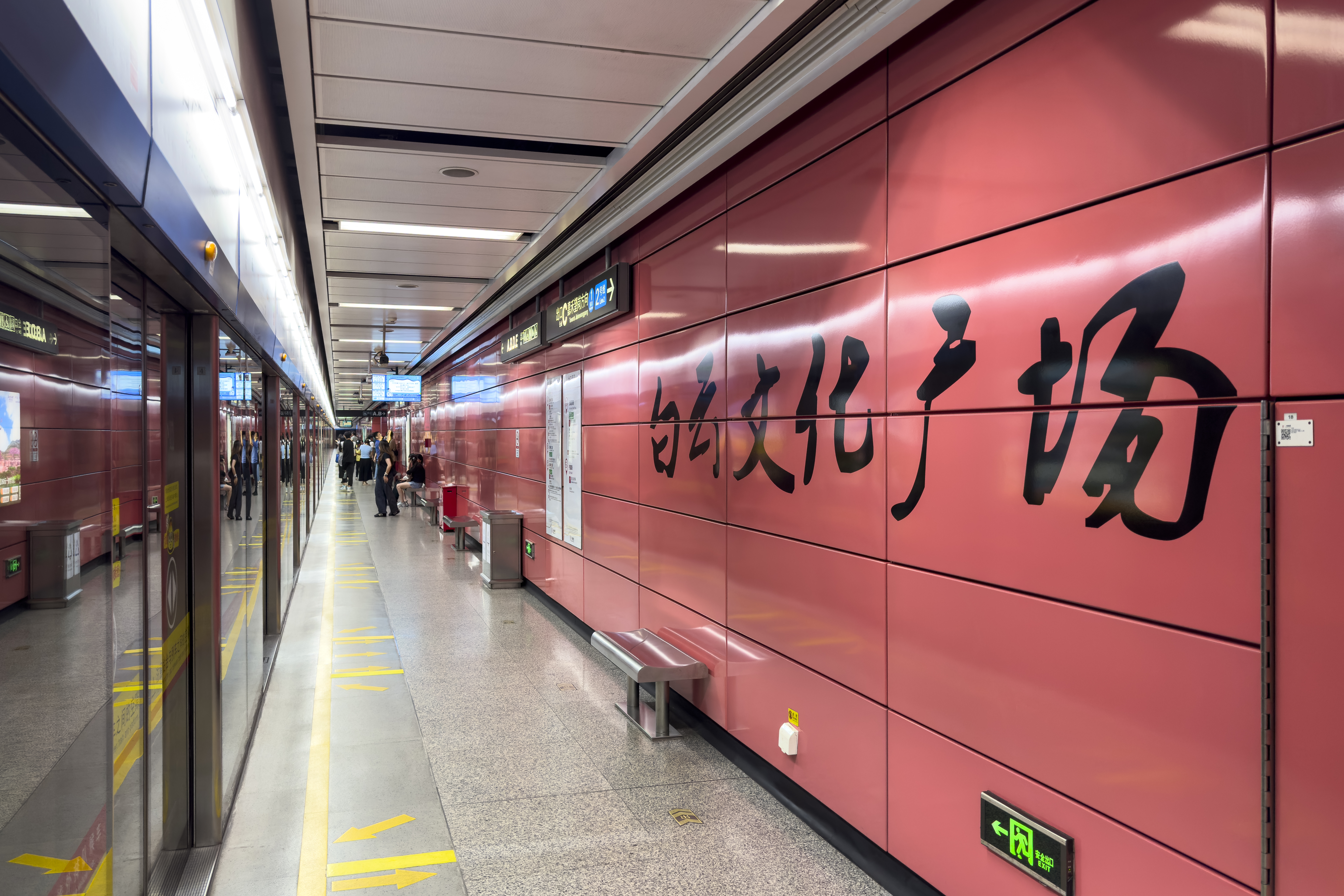
- Platform 2 of Line 2 (towards Guangzhou South Railway Station)

Chinese name
- Simplified Chinese: 白云文化广场站
- Traditional Chinese: 白雲文化廣場站
Transcriptions
Standard Mandarin
- Hanyu Pinyin: Báiyún Wénhuà Guǎngchǎng Zhàn
Yue: Cantonese
- Yale Romanization: Baahk'wàhn Màhnfa Gwóngchèuhng Jaahm
- Jyutping: Baak6wan4 Man4faa3 Gwong2coeng4 Zaam6
- Hong Kong Romanization: Pak Wan Cultural Square station

General information
- Location: Line 2 Between Yuncheng Middle 2nd Road and Yuncheng Middle 3rd Road Line 12 East side of the intersection of Qifu Road (齐富路) and Yuncheng West Road (雲城西路); Yuncheng Subdistrict, Baiyun District, Guangzhou, Guangdong; China
- Coordinates: 23°11′27″N 113°15′58″E
- Operator: Guangzhou Metro Co. Ltd.
- Lines: Line 2; Line 12
- Platforms: 2 (2 side platforms and 1 island platform)
- Tracks: 4

Construction
- Structure type: Underground
- Accessible: Yes

Other information
- Station code: 220 1208

History
- Opened: Line 2: 25 September 2010 (15 years ago); Line 12: 29 June 2025 (13 months ago)

Services
Preceding station	Guangzhou Metro	Following station
Baiyun Park towards Guangzhou South Railway Station	Line 2	Xiao-gang towards Jiahewanggang
Xinshixu towards Xunfenggang	Line 12 West section	Guangzhou Gymnasium Terminus
Location

Baiyun Culture Square Station (simplified Chinese: 白云文化广场站; traditional Chinese: 白雲文化廣場站; Jyutping: baak6 wan4 man4 faa3 gwong2 coeng4 zaam6; Cantonese Yale: Baahk'wàhn Màhnfa Gwóngchèuhng Jaahm), formerly called Xinshi Station (Note: Chinese: 新市站; pinyin: Xīnshì Zhàn; Jyutping: san1si5 zaam6) and later Convention Centre Station (Note: simplified Chinese: 会议中心站; traditional Chinese: 會議中心站; pinyin: Huìyì Zhōngxīn Zhàn; Jyutping: wui2ji5 zung1sam1 zaam6) during planning, is an interchange station between Line 2 and Line 12 of the Guangzhou Metro. The Line 2 station is located underground at the west end of Baiyun International Convention Centre, (Note: 白云国际会议中心) the east of Yuncheng West Road (Note: 云城西路; 雲城西路; Yúnchéng Xī Lù; wan4sing4 sai1 lou6) and the south of Qifu Road, (Note: 齐富路; Qífù Lù; cai4fu3 lou6) in the Baiyun District of Guangzhou. The Line 2 station started operation on 25 September 2010. The Line 12 station is located underground on the east side of the intersection if Qifu Road and Yuncheng West Road and started operation on 29 June 2025.

There are a total of six Chinese characters in the station name, which is the longest station name in the current Guangzhou Metro network, tied together with Jingxi Nanfang Hospital station of Line 3.

== Station layout ==
Baiyun Culture Square Station is divided into two stations, Line 2 and Line 12, of which Line 2 is located between Yuncheng Middle 2nd Road and Yuncheng Middle 3rd Road, underground on the central axis of the old Baiyun Airport runway. The station body of Line 12 is located on the east side of the Yuncheng West Road intersection with Qifu Road. The station is surrounded by Qifu Road, Yuncheng West Road, Yuncheng Middle 2nd Road, Yuncheng Middle 3rd Road, Guangzhou Baiyun International Conference Center Hotel Group, Guangzhou Urban Planning and Exhibition Center, Guangdong Painting Institute and other nearby buildings.

=== Line 2 ===
The Line 2 station is a two-storey underground station. The ground level is the exit, the first floor are the platforms for Line 2 and its west and east concourses, and the second floor is a connecting passage.

G	-	Exits, A, B, C
L1; 2 Concourse and Platforms	West Lobby	Ticket Machines, Customer Service, Police Station, Security Facilities; Transfer passage towards Line 12
L1; 2 Concourse and Platforms	Side platform, doors will open on the right
L1; 2 Concourse and Platforms	Platform 2	2 towards Guangzhou South Railway Station (Baiyun Park)
L1; 2 Concourse and Platforms	Platform 1	2 towards Jiahewanggang (Xiao-gang)
L1; 2 Concourse and Platforms	Side platform, doors will open on the right
L1; 2 Concourse and Platforms	East Lobby	Ticket Machines, Customer Service, Shops, Security Screening Facilities; Two-storey paid area transfer passage towards Line 12
L2; Passageway	-	Passageway between Platforms 1 & 2

=== Line 12 ===
The Line 12 station is a three-storey underground station. The ground level is the exit, the first floor is the concourse, the second floor is the equipment level, and the third floor is the platform for Line 12.

In addition, the transfer passage connecting to Line 2 is also divided into two floors, of which the lower transfer passage is located under the main line track next to the Line 2 station structure, leading to Platform 1 of Line 2 and the east concourse.

G	-	Exits D and E
L1; 12 Concourse	Lobby	Ticket Machines, Customer Service, Shops, Police Station, Security Facilities
L1; 12 Concourse		Transfer passage towards 2
L2	Mezzanine	Station Equipment
L2	Lower level transfer passage	Paid area transfer towards L1 transfer passage and Line 2 platform 1/east concourse
L3; Platforms	Platform 4	12 towards Xunfenggang (Xinshixu)
L3; Platforms	Island platform, doors will open on the left (Toilets, Nursery)
L3; Platforms	Platform 3	12 towards Guangzhou Gymnasium (terminus)

=== Concourse and transfer method ===
The station is divided into two concourses, Line 2 west, east and Line 12, all of which are located on the first floor. The two lines are connected by a long transfer passage, and it takes about 6 minutes to walk. The interchange is divided into paid and non-paid areas, with the paid area having a moving walkway. In addition, the two stations and platforms of Line 2 are connected by a paid area connecting passage under the two tracks and the lower transfer passage of Line 12, and the two stations are not connected via the non-payment area.

There are elevators, escalators, and stairs in the fare-paid area of Line 12 for passengers to reach the platform.

The concourses are equipped with electronic ticket vending machines and AI customer service centers. There is a 7-Eleven convenience store in the east concourse of Line 2, as well as vending machines. There is an automated external defibrillator at the Line 2 concourse near Exit C and the Line 12 concourse near Exit D.

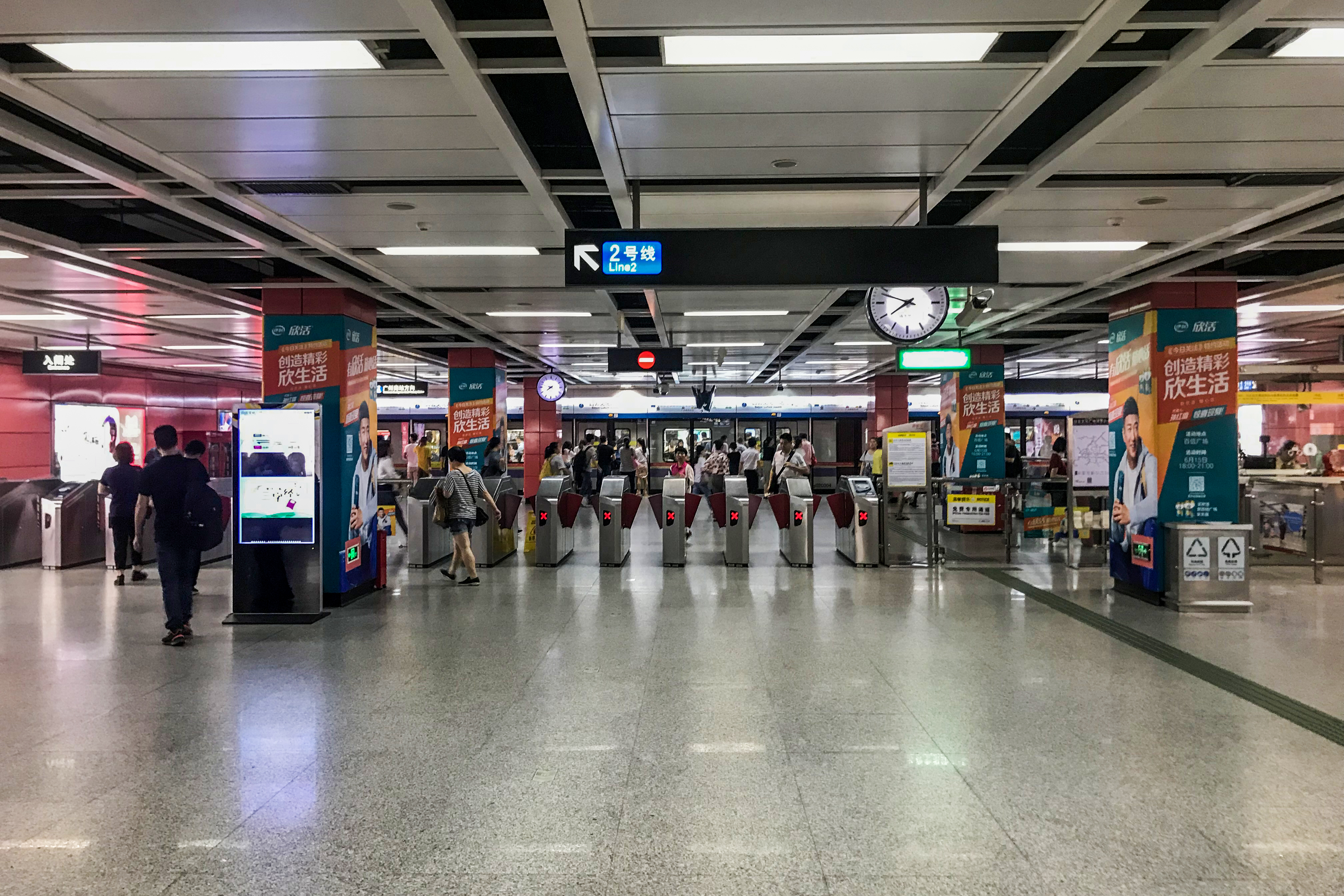
Line 2 west concourse

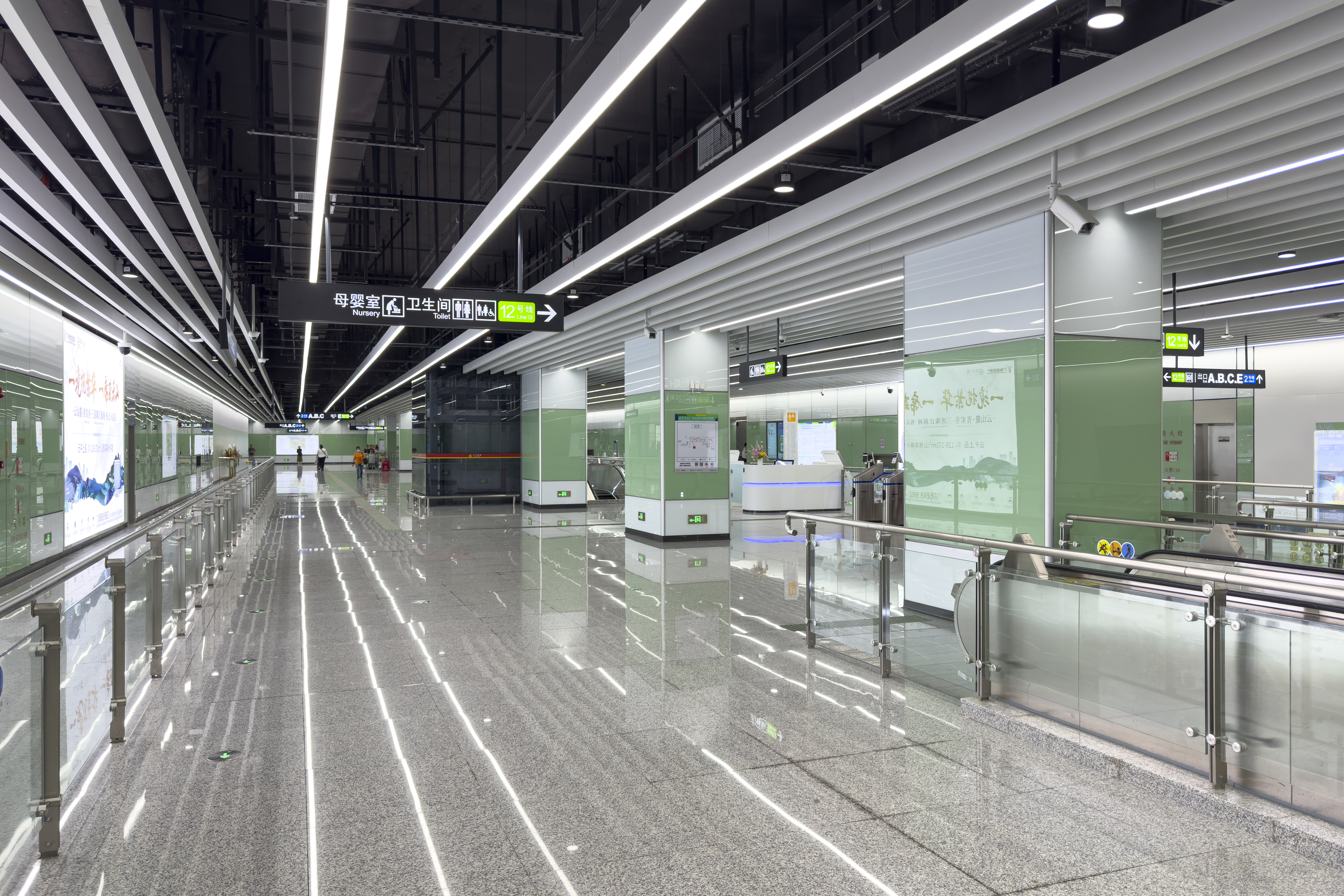
Line 12 concourse

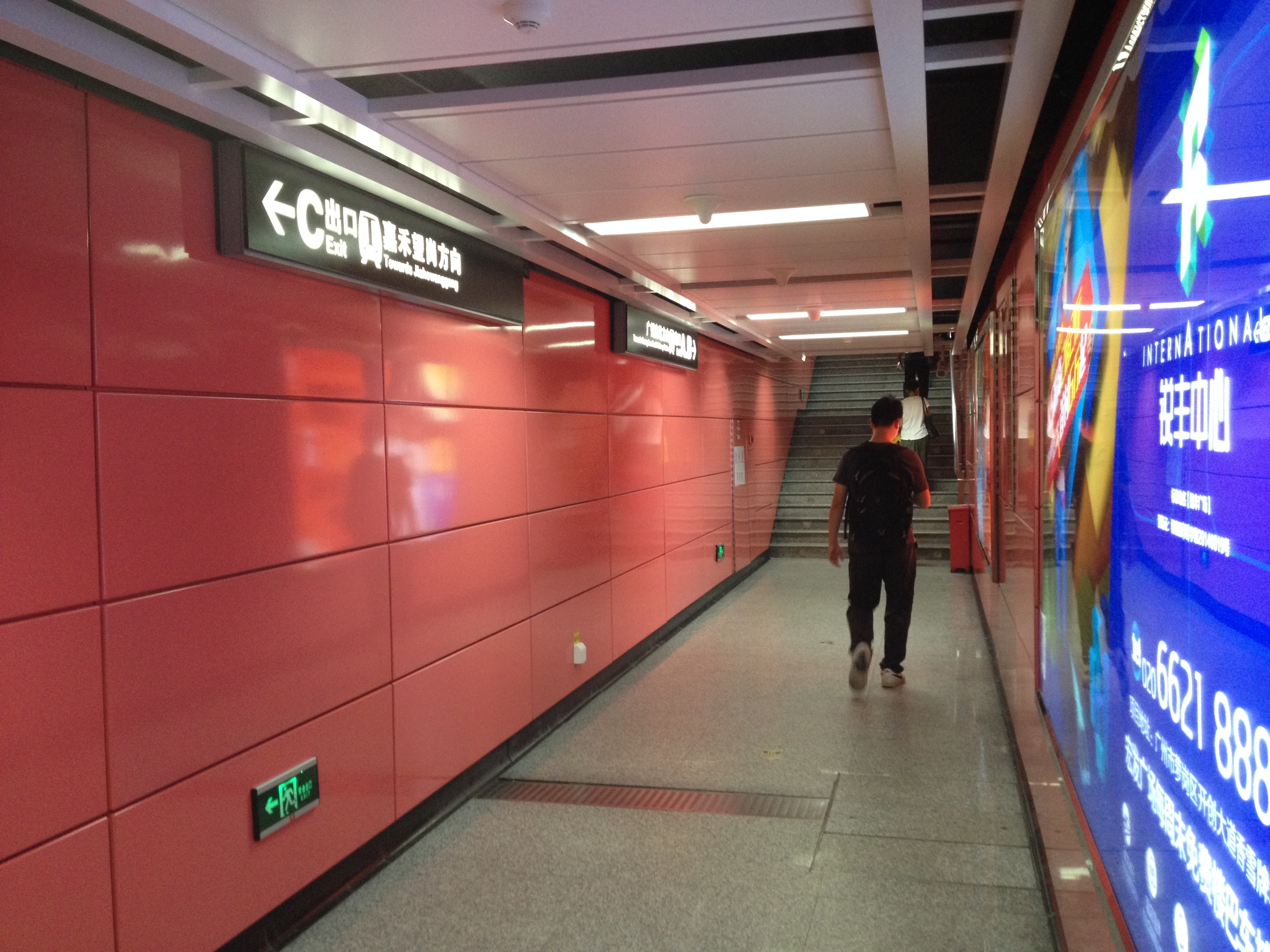
Line 2 paid connecting passage

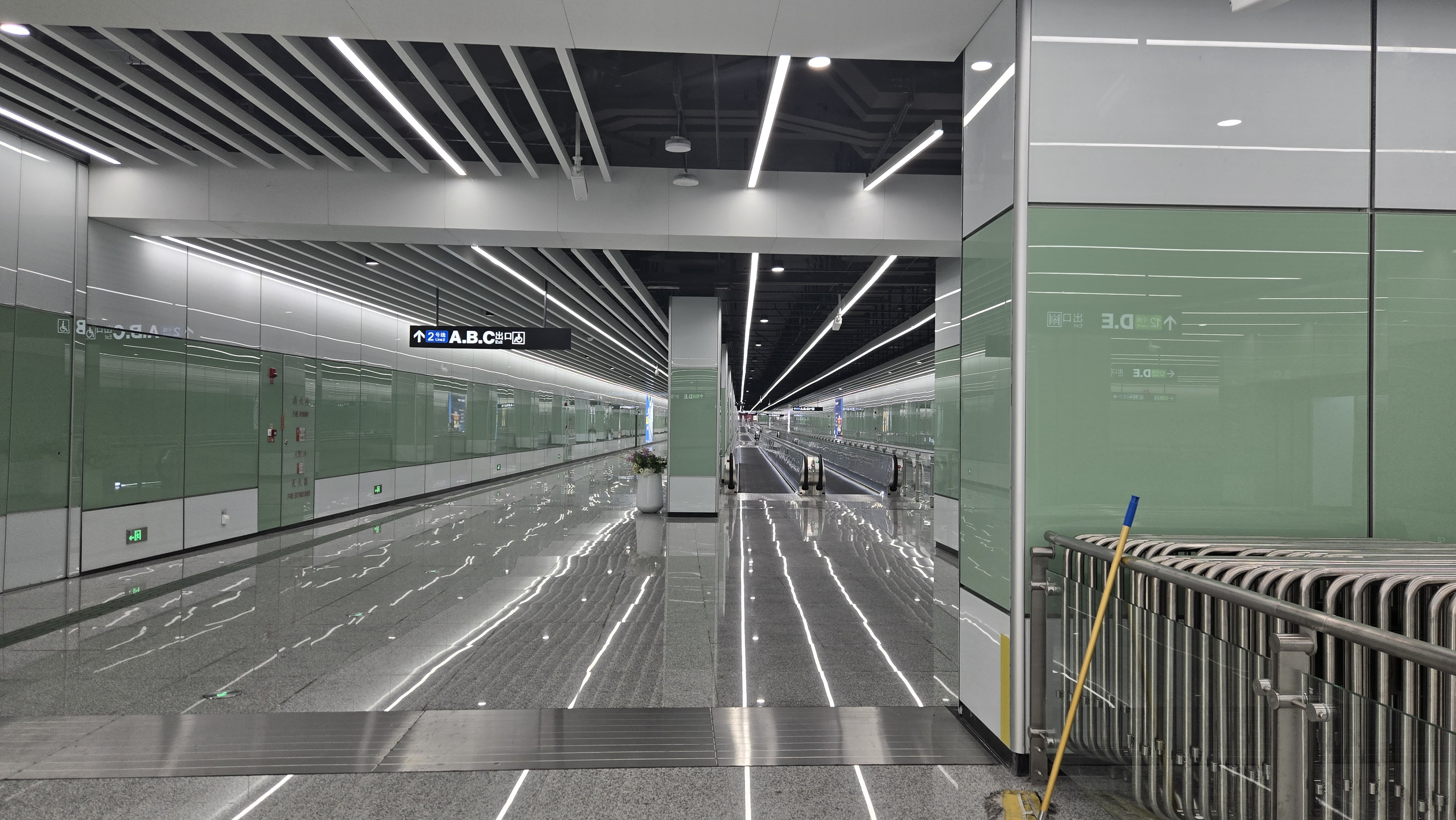
Paid transfer passage between the two lines

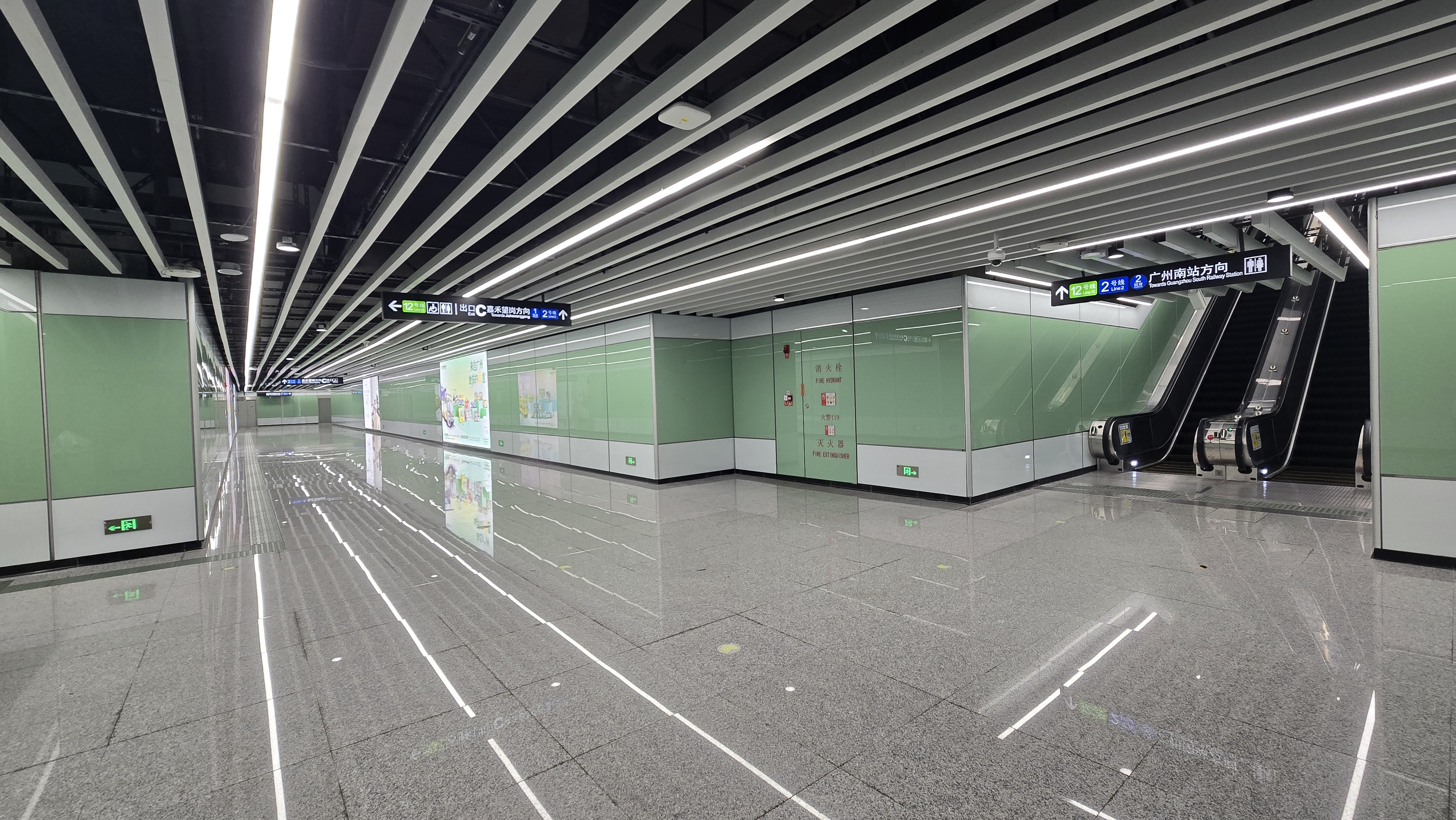
Lower paid transfer passage between the two lines

=== Platforms ===
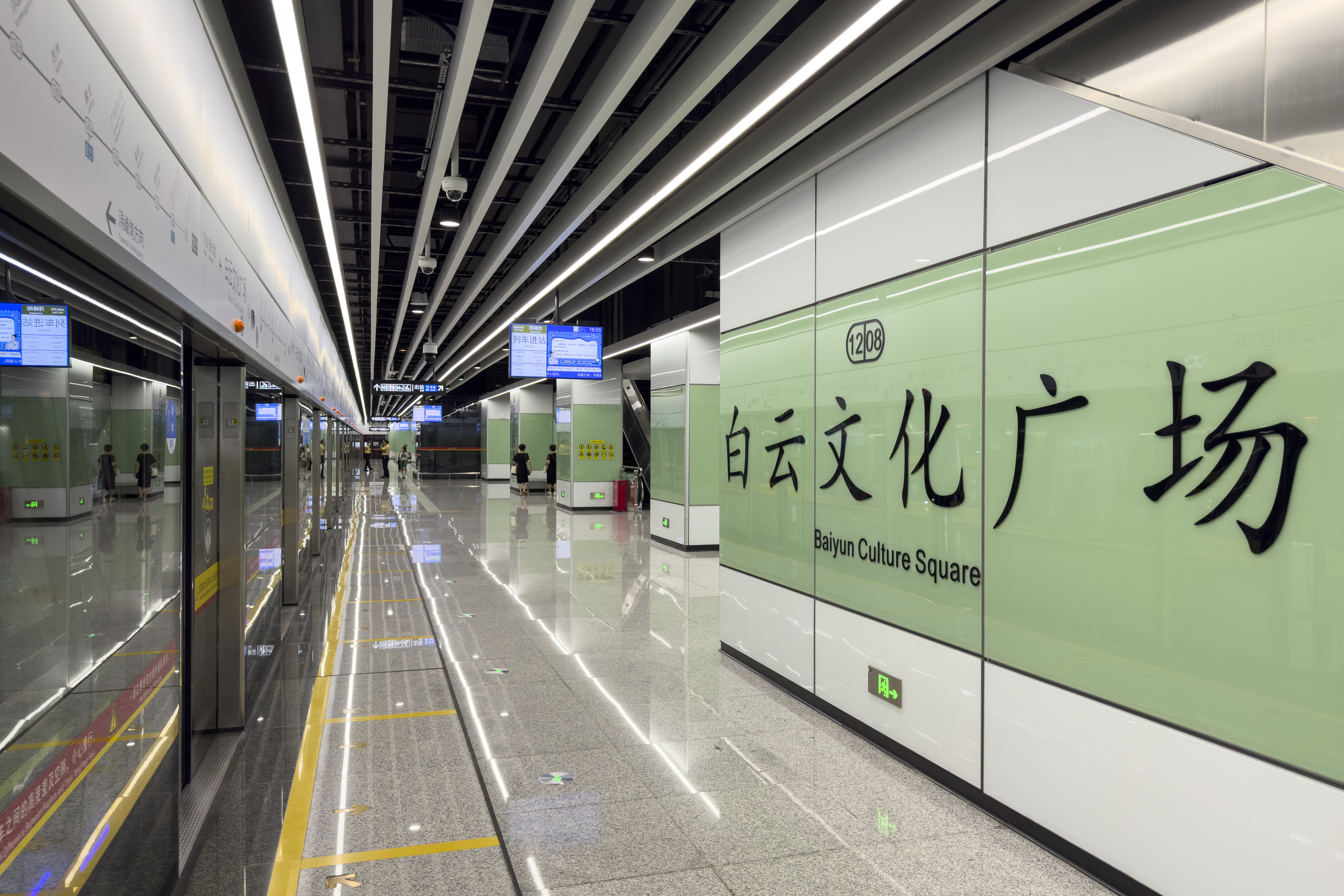
Line 12 Platform 4 (towards Xunfenggang)

The Line 2 station has two side platforms, located underneath the middle axis of the old Baiyun Airport. In the eyes of passengers, the two platforms appear to be two one-way platforms located on different floors, but in fact they are opposite-type platforms, but the two platforms are completely blocked by a wall, so that passengers do not know that the two platforms are located on the same floor, similar to the design of the Line 2 stations between Feixiang Park station and Huangbian station (except Xiao-gang).

Line 12 has an island platform located underneath Qifu Road. The platform is equipped with toilets and a nursery room.

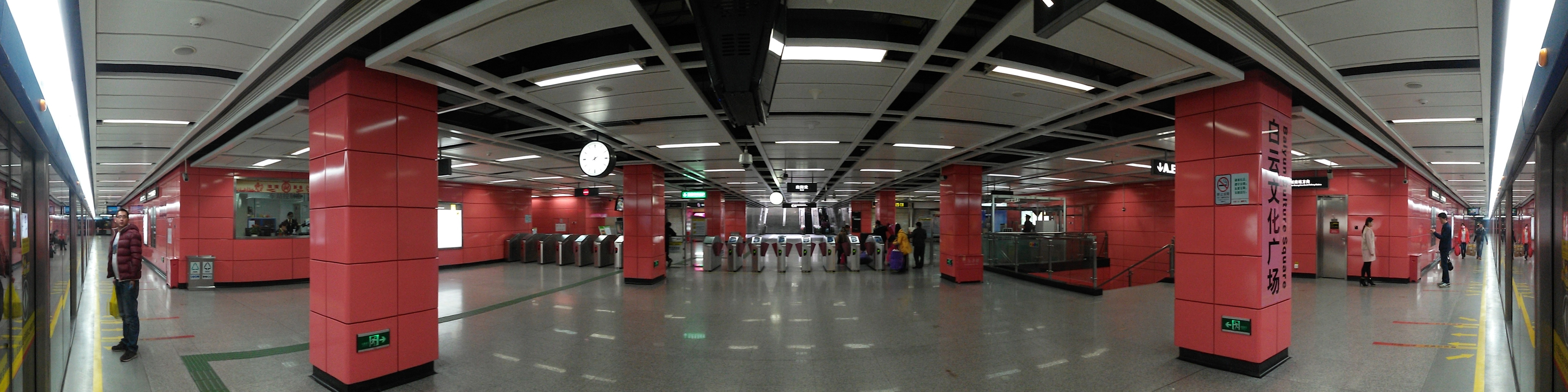
Line 2 platform 1 panorama

=== Entrances/exits ===
The station has 5 points of entry/exit, of which Exits A and B are located in the Line 2 west concourse, Exit C in the Line 2 east concourse, and Exits D and E are located in the Line 12 concourse. Exits B and C are equipped with stairlifts, and Exit D is equipped with an elevator.

==== Line 2 west concourse ====
- A: Yuncheng Middle 3rd Road
- B: Yuncheng Middle 2nd Road

==== Line 2 east concourse ====
- C: Yuncheng Middle 2nd Road, Guangzhou Urban Planning Exhibition Center

==== Line 12 concourse ====
- D: Yuncheng West Road
- E: Qifu Road
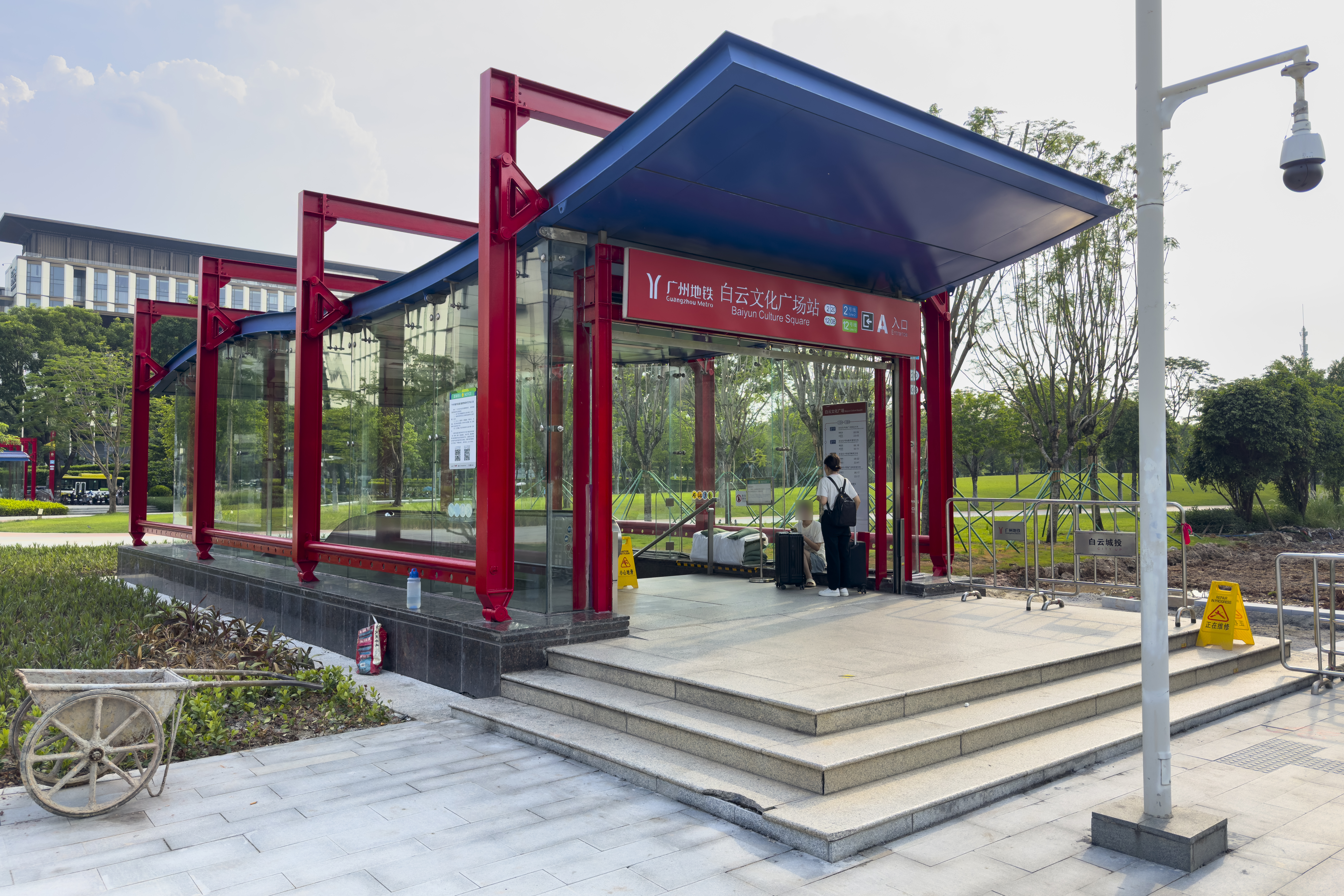
Entrance A

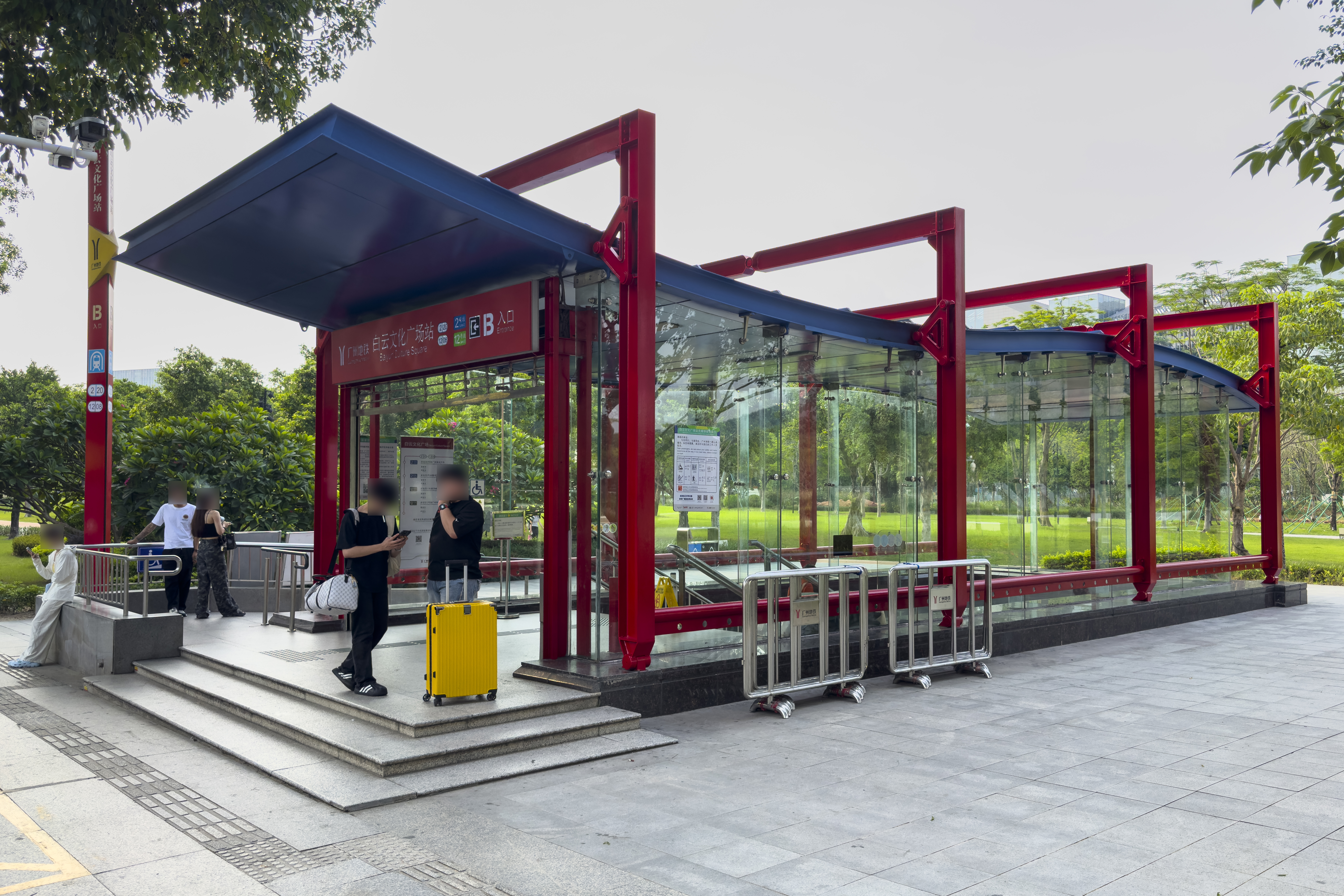
Entrance B

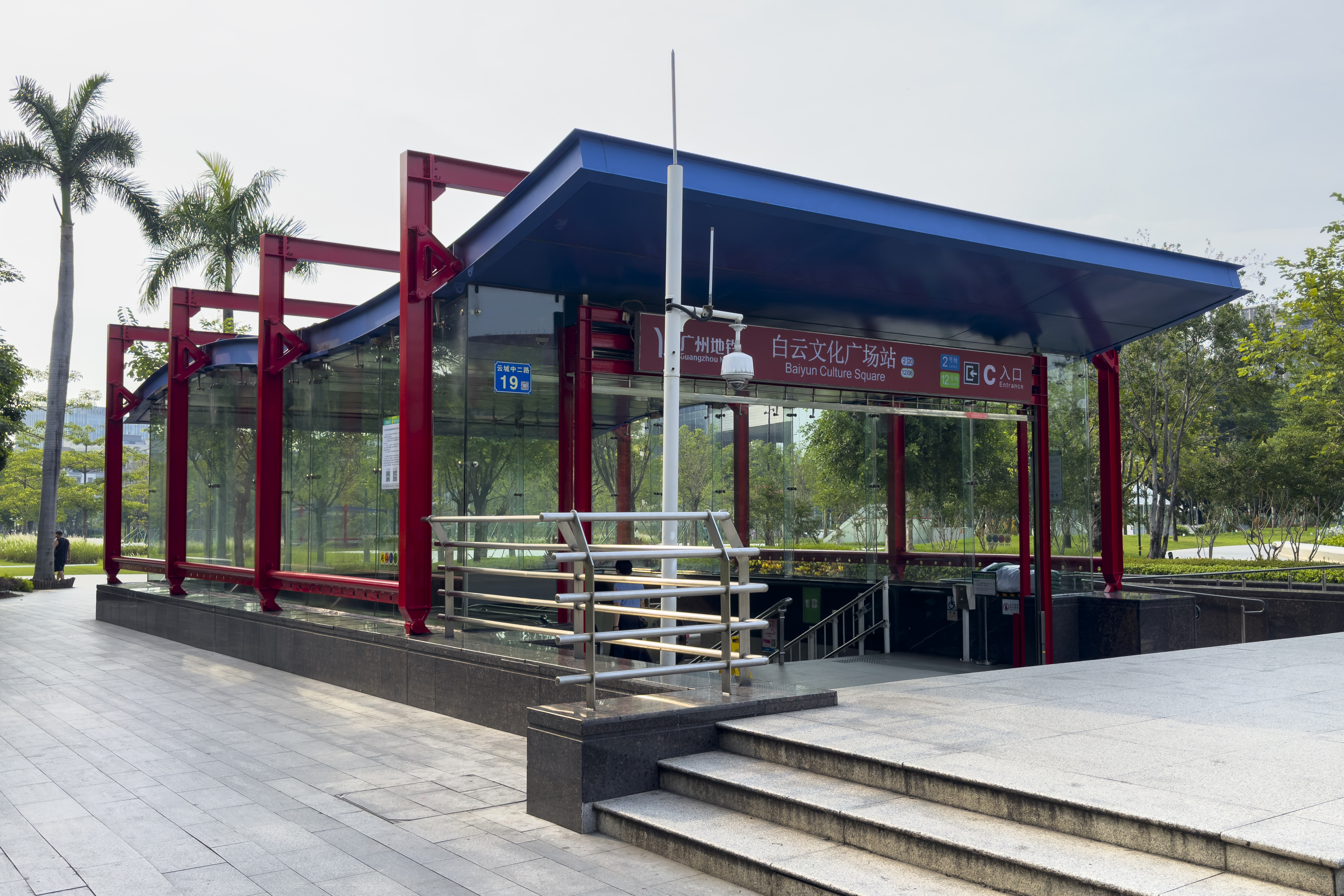
Entrance C

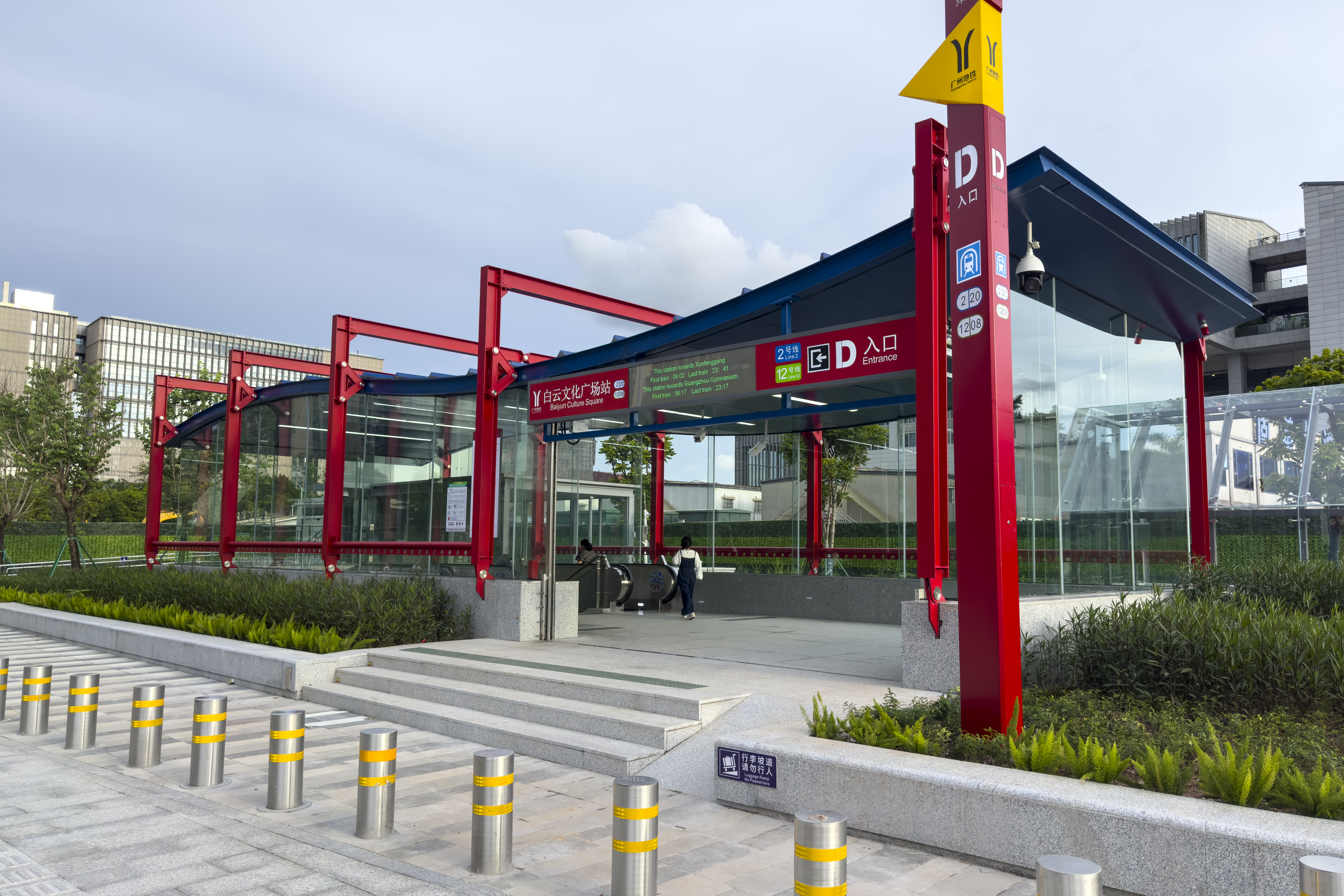
Entrance D

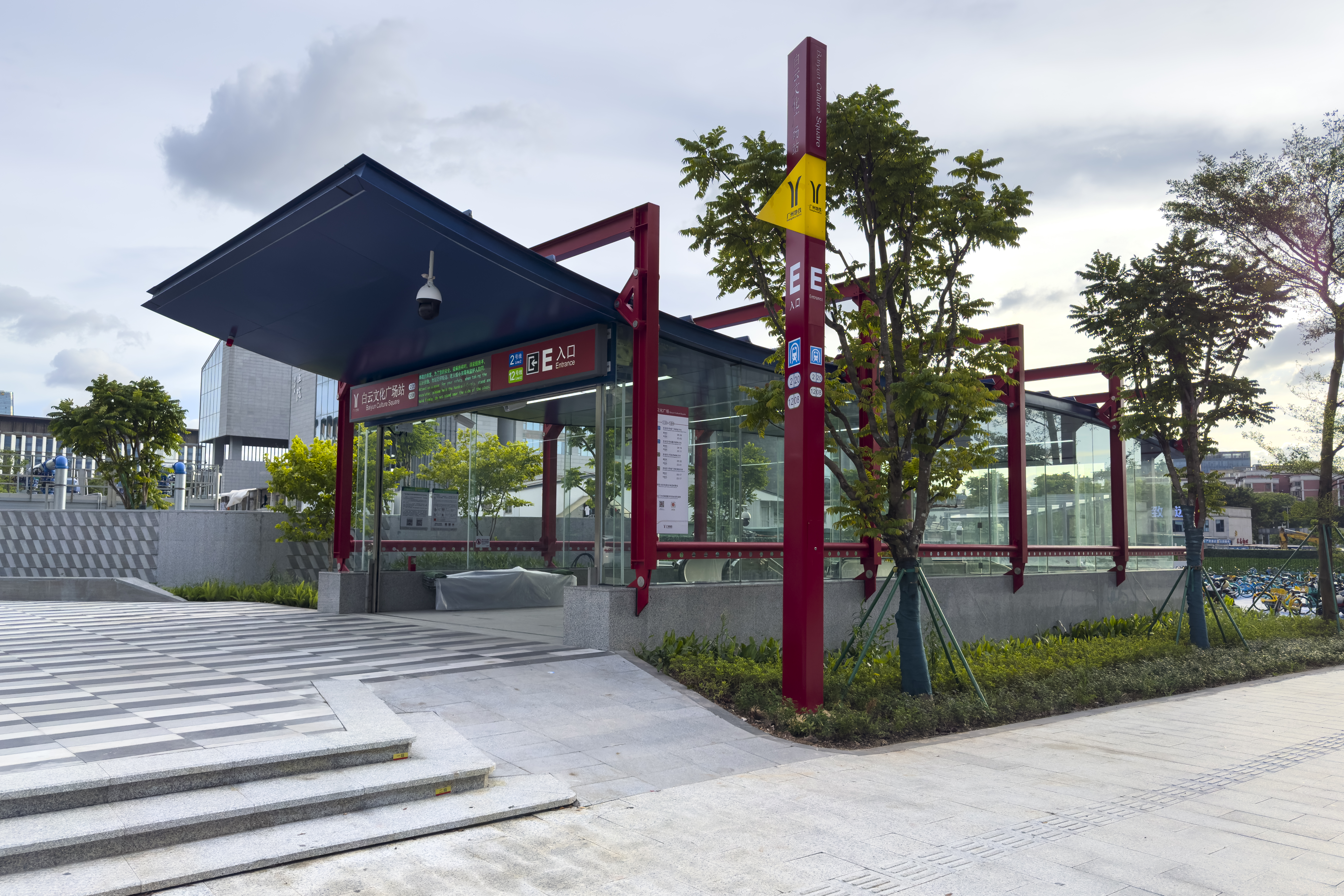
Entrance E

== History ==
=== Line 2 ===
The station first appeared in 1997 in the "Guangzhou City Expressway, Traffic Line Planning Research (Final Report)", is a station along the line after the split of Line 2/8. Since the northern section of the planned line at that time was along Airport Road and National Highway 106, the station was also set up near the Airport Road and Xinshi, and was named Xinshi station at that time. Later, in the 2000 plan, in response to the relocation of the old Baiyun Airport, the northern section of Line 2 north of Sanyuanli was also changed to follow the middle axis of the old Baiyun Airport, and the station location was also changed to the current location.

In February 2010, the station was named Baiyun Culture Square station according to the city square surrounded by the planned Municipal Museum, Guangzhou Urban Planning and Exhibition Center, Provincial Academy of Painting, Municipal Academy of Painting, and Lingnan Cultural Center. Due to the late construction schedule of relevant cultural venues, there was no square named "Baiyun Culture Square" for a long time, and many citizens were misled by the name of the station. It was not until April 2023 that the "Baiyun New Town Civic Square" appeared on the Line 2 map. Because the name of the station does not correspond to the actual place, this station and the two stations of Baiyun Park and Feixiang Park, which also belong to Line 2, are nicknamed "Baiyun Three Liars" by citizens.

The station officially started construction in 2007. On 25 September 2010, the station was opened with the new Line 2 and Line 8.

During COVID-19 pandemic control rules in 2022, the station was affected by prevention and control measures many times and needed to adjust its services. During the epidemic in April, the station was suspended from 9 to 17 April. During the year-end epidemic, the station was suspended from 21 to 27 November.

=== Line 12 ===
In the 1997 "Guangzhou Urban Expressway" Traffic Network Planning Study (Final Report), the interchange station between Line 2 and Line 6 (the relevant section became the current Line 12) was located at Gangbei station at the intersection of Airport Road Gangbei Road, before it was changed to the current Baiyun Park station with Line 2 in the 2000 plan. However, in 2016, in response to the planning needs of Tangxi Station of the National Railway (now Guangzhou Baiyun railway station), the planned route of Line 12 was changed to intersect with Line 2 at this station.

The station of Line 12 was originally located on the east side of the Yuncheng West Road intersection of Yuncheng Middle 3rd Road, directly connected to the west concourse of Line 2, and at the same time, the Line 12 platform is planned to be connected to the side of platform 1 on the Line 2 east concourse. Although the station plan has a relatively close transfer distance, it is necessary to pass under many houses within Guangzhou Baiyun International Convention Center and Xiaogang Village between the adjacent areas of the station, which comes with a greater construction risk. Therefore, the station was moved north and set up on the east side of the intersection between Yuncheng West Road and Qifu Road, and the distance from the Line 2 was greatly increased, so only a transfer passage connecting the Line 2 west concourse could be built. As the transfer passage is 350 meters long, there will be moving walkways within the passageway. At the same time, the existing Line 2 station will be expanded and the waiting space of the Line 2 station will also be expanded. An escalator crossing under the Line 2 track area was added to meet the need for interchanges between Line 2 northbound and Line 12.

On 11 October 2019, Qifu Road was enclosed, and on 7 November 2019, Exhibition Road was enclosed to cooperate with the construction of the Line 12 station. The roof slab was sealed in October 2022. Part of the Line 2 station was also enclosed in October 2024 to facilitate the connection to the Line 12 station and the commencement of related ancillary works. The Line 12 station completed the "three rights" transfer on 27 March 2025.

On 29 June 2025, the Line 12 station opened.
