= Jiangnanxi station =

Guangzhou Metro station

Coordinates: 23.0970°N 113.2739°E

Jiangnanxi 江南西
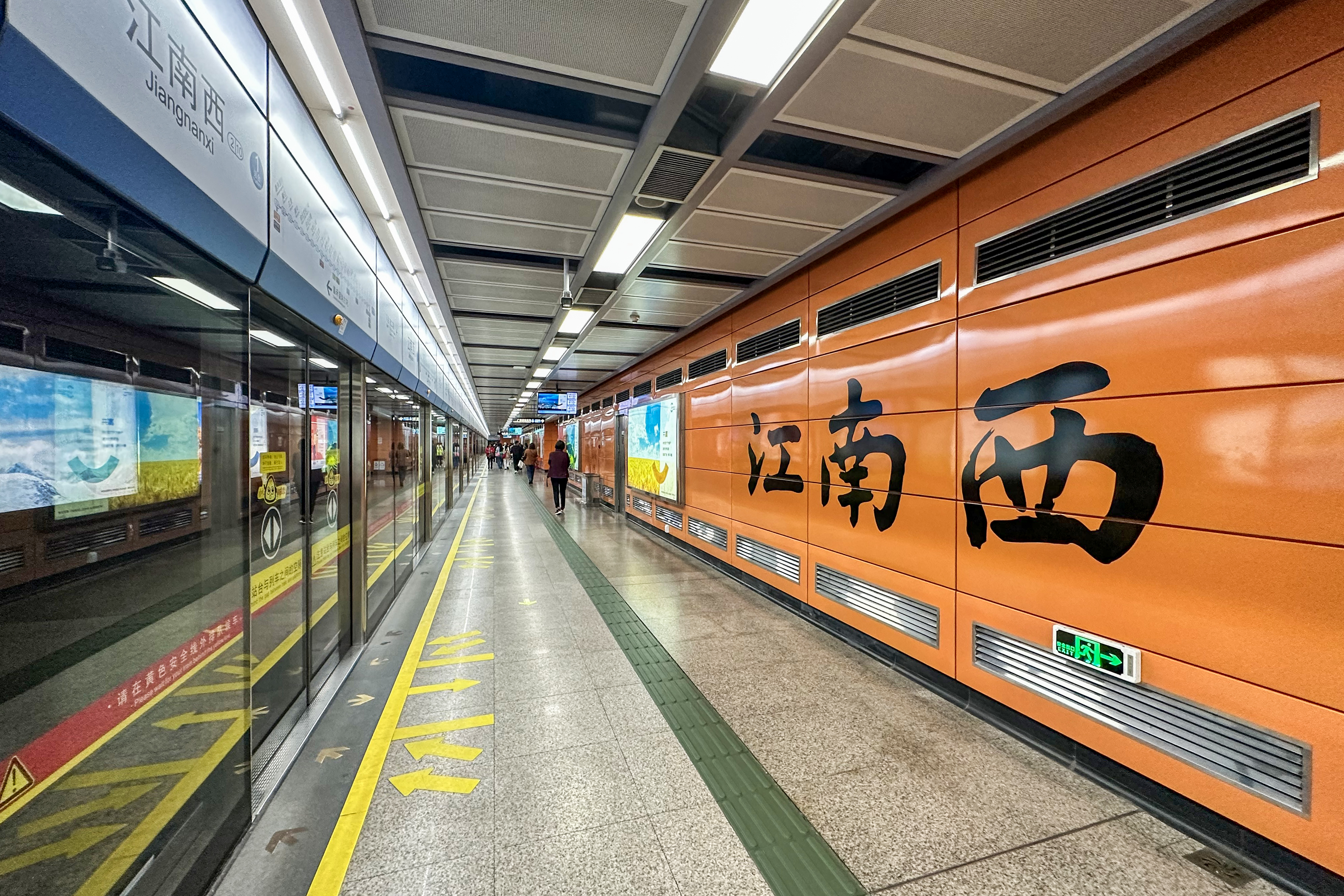

Chinese name
- Chinese: 江南西站
- Literal meaning: (South of the River) West Station
Transcriptions
Standard Mandarin
- Hanyu Pinyin: Jiāngnán Xī Zhàn
Yue: Cantonese
- Yale Romanization: Gōngnàahm Sāi Jaahm
- Jyutping: Gong1naam4 Sai1 Zaam6

General information
- Location: Haizhu District, Guangzhou, Guangdong; China
- Operated by: Guangzhou Metro Co. Ltd.
- Line: Line 2
- Platforms: 2 (2 side platforms)

Construction
- Structure type: Underground

Other information
- Station code: 210

History
- Opened: 29 December 2002; 23 years ago

Services
Preceding station	Guangzhou Metro	Following station
Changgang towards Guangzhou South Railway Station	Line 2	The 2nd Workers' Cultural Palace towards Jiahewanggang
Location

Jiangnanxi Station (Chinese: 江南西站; Jyutping: gong1 naam4 sai1 zaam6; Cantonese Yale: Gōngnàahm Sāi Jaahm; lit. 'Jiangnan (South of the River) West Station') is a station on Line 2 of the Guangzhou Metro that started operations on 29 December 2002. It is located under Jiangnan Middle Avenue (江南大道中) in the Haizhu District of Guangzhou. The station is in the main shopping area for the district.

Before Line 2's extension in September 2010, the station was the last on Line 2 proper when a continuous route between Sanyuanli and Wanshengwei was deployed.
