= Xiaogang station =

Xiaogang station could refer to:

- Xiao-gang station (Guangzhou Metro line 2) in Guangzhou, Guangdong Province, China
- Xiaogang station (Guangzhou Metro line 8) in Guangzhou, Guangdong Province, China
- Xiaogang station (Qingdao Metro), a station on Line 2 of Qingdao Metro, in Qingdao, Shandong Province, China

== See also ==
- Siaogang metro station in Kaohsiung, Taiwan
