= Jiangxia station =

Guangzhou Metro station

Coordinates: 23.2113°N 113.2835°E

Jiangxia 江夏
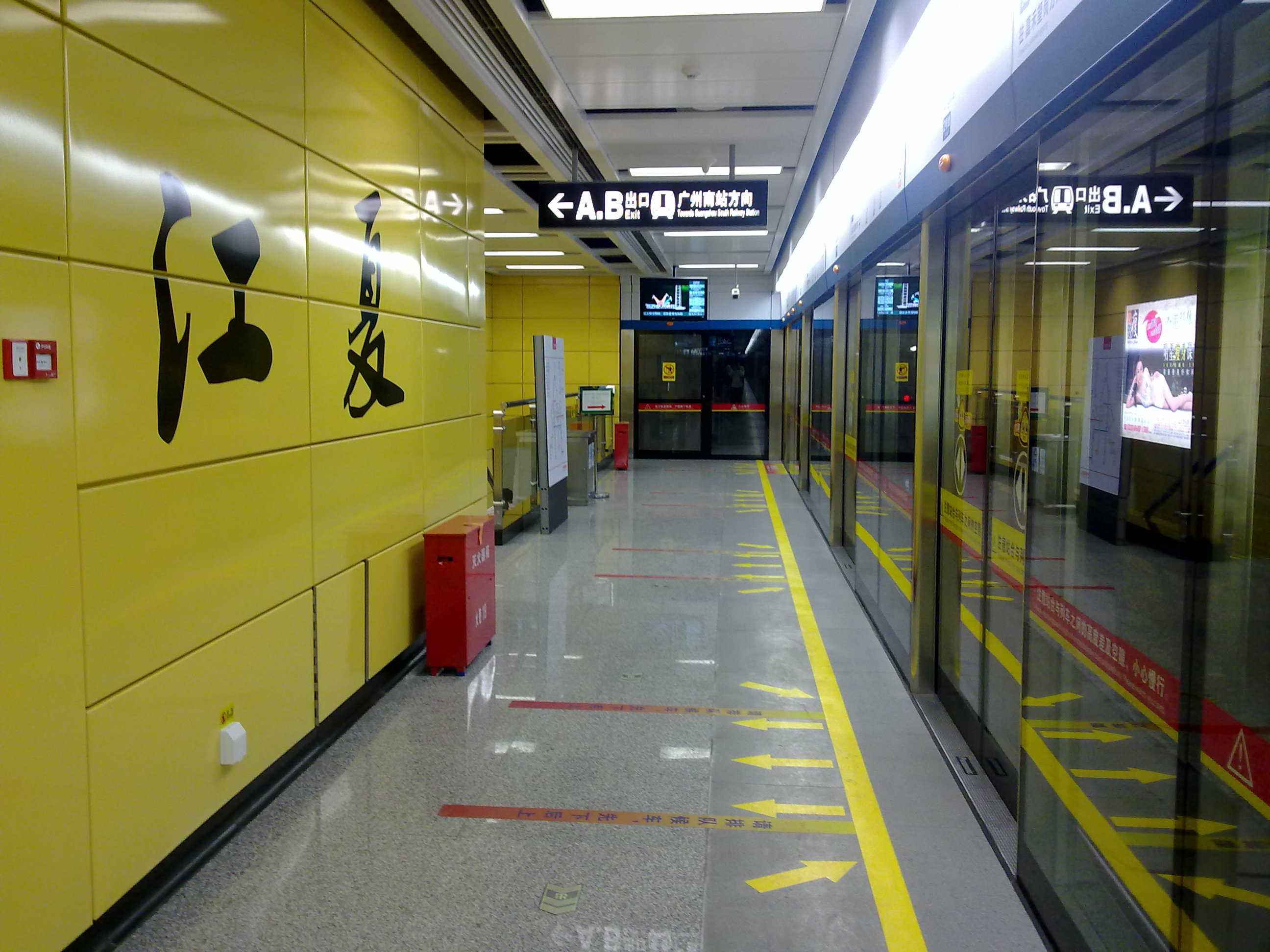

Chinese name
- Chinese: 江夏站
Transcriptions
Standard Mandarin
- Hanyu Pinyin: Jiāngxià Zhàn
Yue: Cantonese
- Yale Romanization: Gōnghah Jaahm
- Jyutping: Gong1haa6 Zaam6
- Hong Kong Romanization: Kong Ha station

General information
- Location: Baiyun District, Guangzhou, Guangdong; China
- Operated by: Guangzhou Metro Co. Ltd.
- Line: Line 2
- Platforms: 2 (2 side platforms)

Construction
- Structure type: Underground

Other information
- Station code: 222

History
- Opened: 25 September 2010; 15 years ago

Services
Preceding station	Guangzhou Metro	Following station
Xiao-gang towards Guangzhou South Railway Station	Line 2	Huangbian towards Jiahewanggang
Location

Jiangxia Station (Chinese: 江夏站; Jyutping: gong1 haa6 zaam6; Cantonese Yale: Gōnghah Jaahm), known as Chentiancun Station during planning, is a metro station on Line 2 of the Guangzhou Metro. It is located under the north of Jiangxia East Second Road (江夏东二路) and the west of Baiyun Shangcheng Garden (白云尚城花园), in the Baiyun District of Guangzhou. It started operation on 25 September 2010.
