= Baiyun Park station =

Guangzhou Metro station

Coordinates: 23.181613°N 113.270966°E

Baiyun Park 白云公园
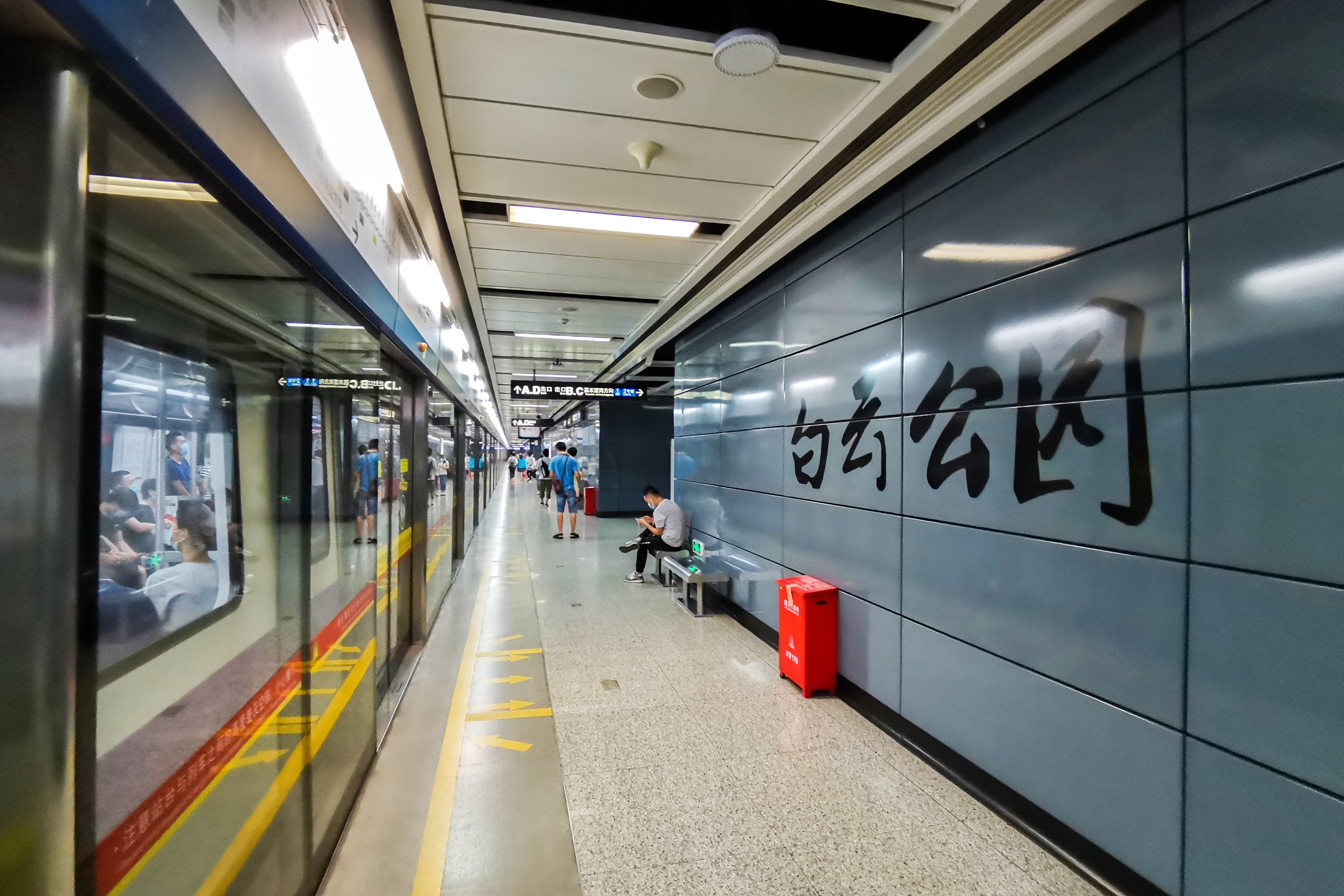
- Platform 2

Chinese name
- Simplified Chinese: 白云公园站
- Traditional Chinese: 白雲公園站
- Literal meaning: white cloud park station
Transcriptions
Standard Mandarin
- Hanyu Pinyin: Báiyún Gōngyuán Zhàn
Yue: Cantonese
- Yale Romanization: Baahk'wàhn Gūng'yún Jaahm
- Jyutping: Baak6wan4 Gung1jyun4 Zaam6
- Hong Kong Romanization: Pak Wan Park station

General information
- Location: Baiyun District, Guangzhou, Guangdong; China
- Operated by: Guangzhou Metro Co. Ltd.
- Line: Line 2
- Platforms: 2 (2 side platforms)

Construction
- Structure type: Underground

Other information
- Station code: 219

History
- Opened: 25 September 2010; 15 years ago

Services
| Preceding station | Guangzhou Metro | Following station |
|---|---|---|
| Feixiang Park towards Guangzhou South Railway Station | Line 2 | Baiyun Culture Square towards Jiahewanggang |
Location

Baiyun Park Station (simplified Chinese: 白云公园站; traditional Chinese: 白雲公園站; Jyutping: baak6 wan4 gung1 jyun2 zaam6; Cantonese Yale: Baahk'wàhn Gūng'yún Jaahm), formerly called Baiyun New Town Station during planning, is a metro station of Guangzhou Metro Line 2. It is located at the underground of Qile Road at the centre area of the former Baiyun International Airport, in the Baiyun District of Guangzhou. It started its operation on 25 September 2010.
