= Feixiang Park station =

Guangzhou Metro station

Coordinates: 23.16951°N 113.26405°E

Feixiang Park 飞翔公园
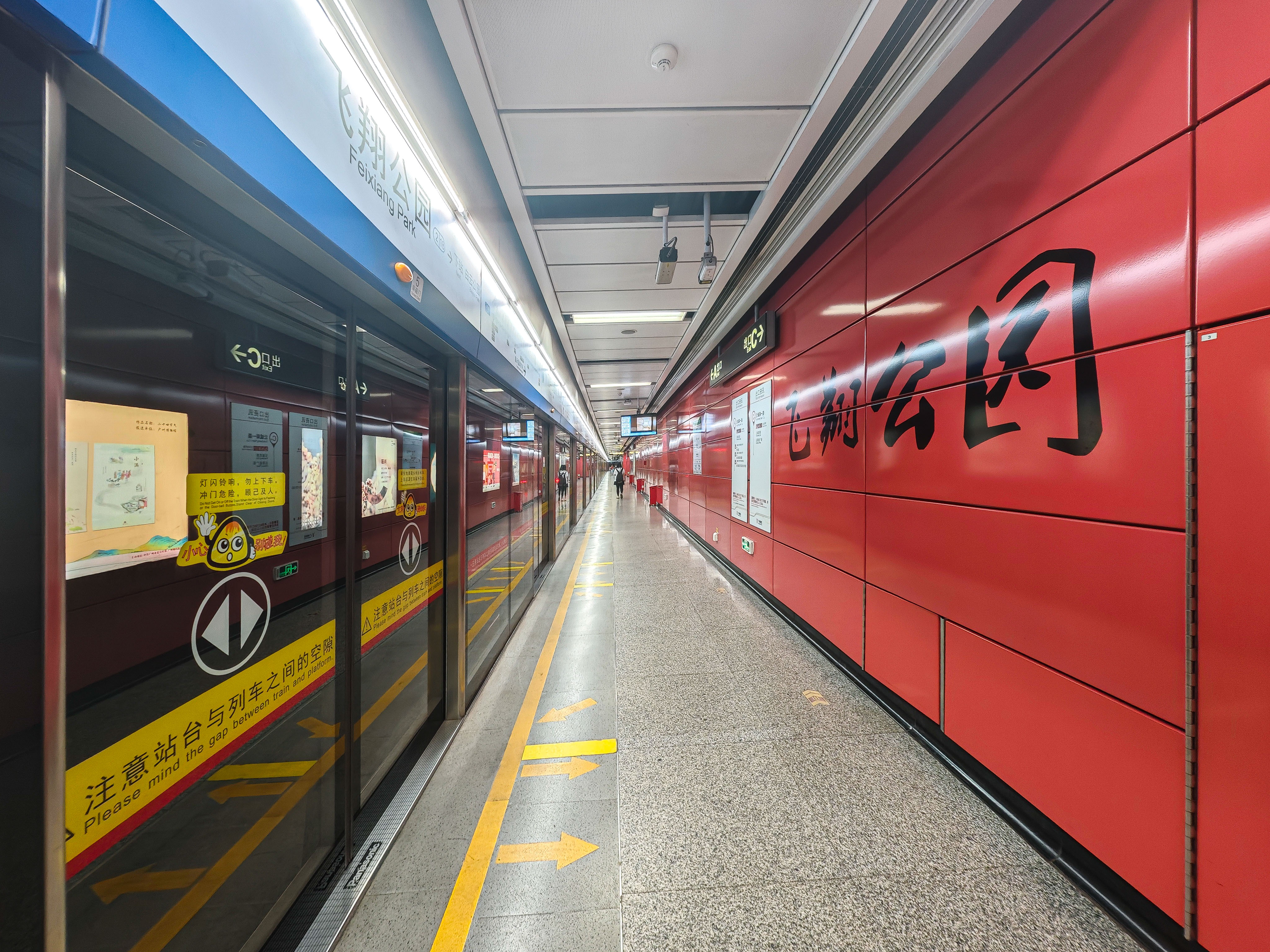

Chinese name
- Simplified Chinese: 飞翔公园站
- Traditional Chinese: 飛翔公園站
Transcriptions
Standard Mandarin
- Hanyu Pinyin: Fēixiáng Gōngyuán Zhàn
Yue: Cantonese
- Yale Romanization: Fēichèuhng Gūng'yún Jaahm
- Jyutping: Fei1coeng4 Gung1jyun2 Zaam6
- Hong Kong Romanization: Fei Cheung Park station

General information
- Location: Yuncheng Road, Baiyun District, Guangzhou, Guangdong; China
- Operated by: Guangzhou Metro Co. Ltd.
- Line: Line 2
- Platforms: 2 (2 side platforms)

Construction
- Structure type: Underground

Other information
- Station code: 218

History
- Opened: 25 September 2010; 15 years ago

Services
Preceding station	Guangzhou Metro	Following station
Sanyuanli towards Guangzhou South Railway Station	Line 2	Baiyun Park towards Jiahewanggang
Location

Feixiang Park Station (simplified Chinese: 飞翔公园站; traditional Chinese: 飛翔公園站; Jyutping: fei1 coeng4 gung1 jyun2 zaam6; Cantonese Yale: Fēichèuhng Gūng'yún Jaahm), known as Yuanjing Station (Note: simplified Chinese: 远景站; traditional Chinese: 遠景站; pinyin: Yuǎnjǐng Zhàn; Jyutping: jyun^{5}ging^{2} zaam^{6}) and later Yuncheng Station (Note: 云城站; 雲城站; Yúnchéng Zhàn; wan^{4}sing^{4} zaam^{6}) during planning, is a metro station on Line 2 of the Guangzhou Metro. It is located under the west side of Yuncheng East Road, (Note: 云城东路) the east side of Yuncheng West Road (Note: 云城西路) and the south side of the former Baiyun International Airport, in the Baiyun District of Guangzhou. It started operation on 25 September 2010.

== Exits ==
The station has two exits, labeled Exit A and C. Exit A has connections to Guangzhou bus 975 and 981.
