= Xiao-gang station (Guangzhou Metro line 2) =

Guangzhou Metro station

Xiao-gang 萧岗
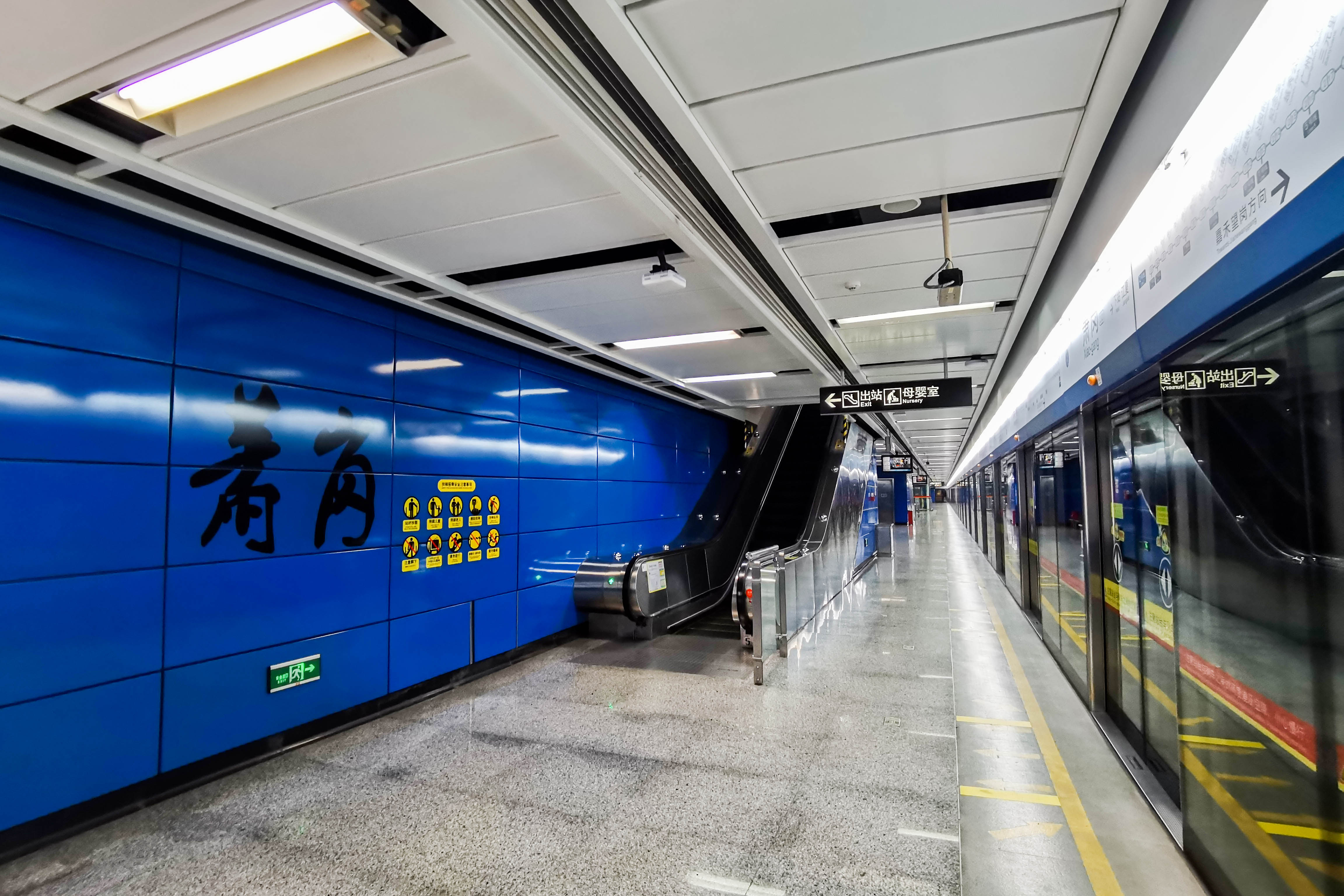
- Platform 1

Chinese name
- Simplified Chinese: 萧岗站
- Traditional Chinese: 蕭崗站
Transcriptions
Standard Mandarin
- Hanyu Pinyin: Xiāogǎng Zhàn
Yue: Cantonese
- Yale Romanization: Sīugōng Jaahm
- Jyutping: Siu1gong1 Zaam6
- Hong Kong Romanization: Siu Kong station

General information
- Location: 2nd Yuncheng North Road; Baiyun District, Guangzhou, Guangdong; China
- Coordinates: 23°12′05″N 113°16′31″E
- Operated by: Guangzhou Metro Co. Ltd.
- Line: Line 2
- Platforms: 3 (1 island platform, 1 side platform)

Construction
- Structure type: Underground

Other information
- Station code: 221

History
- Opened: 25 September 2010; 15 years ago

Services
Preceding station	Guangzhou Metro	Following station
Baiyun Culture Square towards Guangzhou South Railway Station	Line 2	Jiangxia towards Jiahewanggang
Location

Xiao-gang station (simplified Chinese: 萧岗站; traditional Chinese: 蕭崗站; Jyutping: siu1 gong1 zaam6; Cantonese Yale: Sīugōng Jaahm), known as Jiangxia station during planning, is a metro station on Line 2 of the Guangzhou Metro. It is located underground to the south of Huangshi Road East (黄石东路), the east of Yuncheng Road West (云城西路) and the south of Xiaogang River (萧岗涌), in the Baiyun District of Guangzhou. It started operation on 25 September 2010.

Xiao-gang station is within walking distance of the Guangdong University of Foreign Studies north campus, as well as the west gate of Baiyun Mountain.

The English station name is hyphenated to avoid confusion with the similarly named Xiaogang station on Line 8, which, in Mandarin, shares the same pinyin spelling but has a different tonal pronunciation and different characters (萧岗/晓港; Xiāogǎng/Xiǎogǎng). In Cantonese however, the two stations do not share the same spelling when romanised (Sīugōng/Híugóng).
