= Line 2 (Guangzhou Metro) =

Line of the Guangzhou Metro

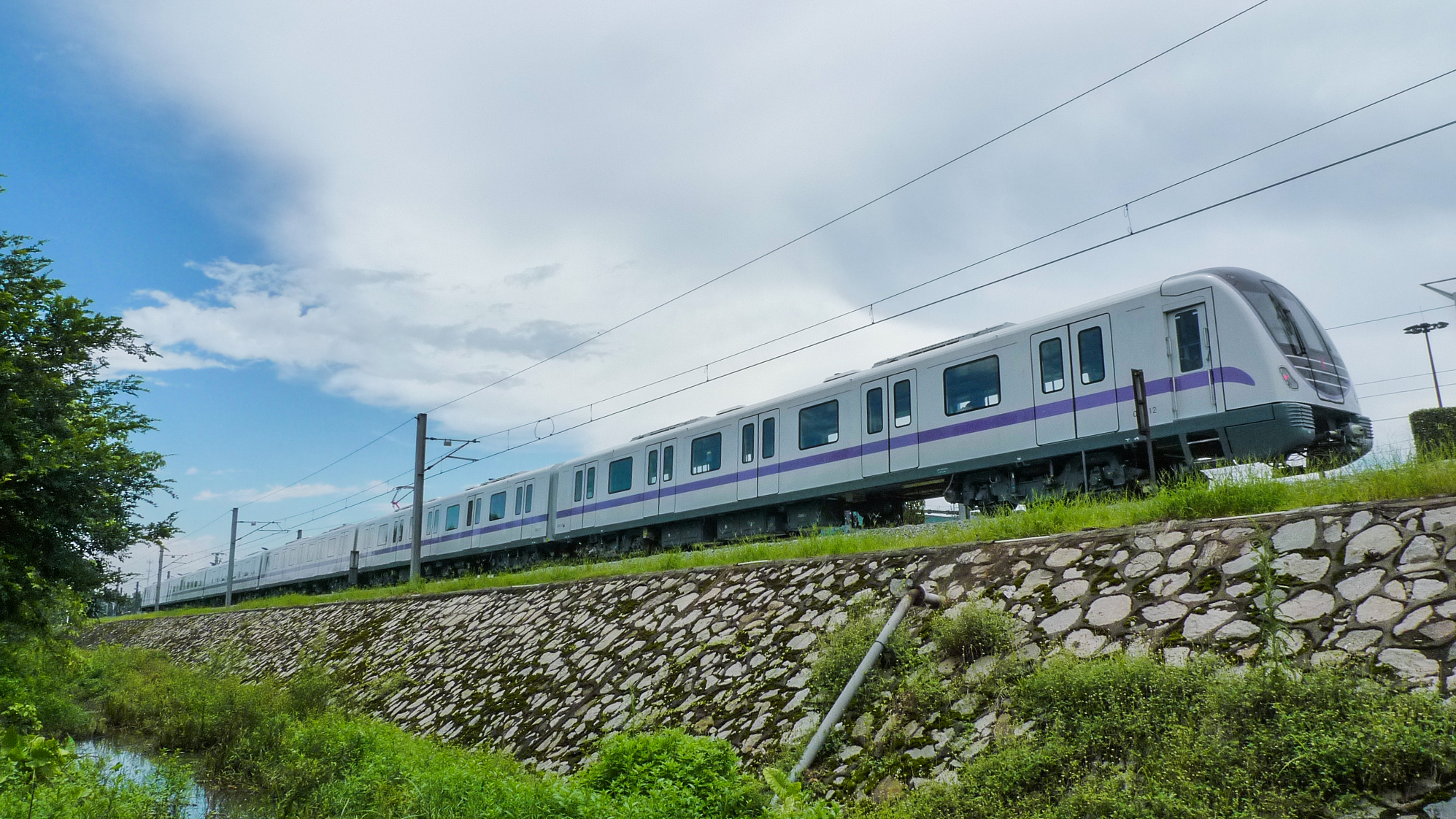
- A train of Guangzhou Metro Line 2

Overview
- Other name(s): M2 ("十" shape plan name); M2 / M3e / L1 (5 lines plan name); M2 (7 lines plan name); M2 / GZn (2000 plan name); Jiahe line (嘉禾线)
- Status: Operational
- Owner: City of Guangzhou
- Locale: Panyu, Haizhu, Yuexiu, and Baiyun districts Guangzhou, Guangdong
- Termini: Guangzhou South Railway Station; Jiahewanggang
- Stations: 24
- Colour on map: Blue (#00629b)

Service
- Type: Rapid transit
- System: Guangzhou Metro
- Services: 1
- Operator: Guangzhou Metro Corporation
- Rolling stock: CRRC Zhuzhou Locomotive Metro cars 26 Bombardier Movia and 130 CRRC Changchun Railway Vehicles Metro cars based in Movia design (extinct)
- Daily ridership: 1.0975 million (2025 daily average); 1.64 million (2014 Peak)

History
- Opened: 29 December 2002 (23 years ago)
- Last extension: 25 September 2010 (16 years ago)

Technical
- Line length: 31.4 km (19.51 mi)
- Number of tracks: Double-track
- Character: Underground
- Track gauge: 1,435 mm (4 ft 8 1/2 in) standard gauge
- Electrification: 1,500 V DC (Overhead lines)
- Operating speed: 80 km/h (50 mph)
- Signalling: Siemens Trainguard LZB 700 M, FTGS Moving block

Line 2
- Simplified Chinese: 广州地铁2号线
- Traditional Chinese: 廣州地鐵2號線
- Cantonese Yale: Gwóngjāu Deihtit Yih Houh Sin
Transcriptions
Standard Mandarin
- Hanyu Pinyin: Guǎngzhōu Dìtiě Èr Hào Xiàn
Yue: Cantonese
- Yale Romanization: Gwóngjāu Deihtit Yih Houh Sin
- Jyutping: gwong2 zau1 dei6 tit3 ji6 hou6 sin3
- Canton Romanization: guong2 zeo1 déi6 tid3 yi6 hou6 xin3

Line 2 of the Guangzhou Metro is a north–south line on the system that runs from Guangzhou South Railway Station to Jiahewanggang, with a total length of 31.4 km (19.51 mi) with 24 stations. All stations in Line 2 are underground. Line 2's color is blue.

The line previously ran together with Line 8 on a single route between Sanyuanli and Wanshengwei stations until the extensions to both lines officially opened on 25 September 2010 and Line 8 was split off from Line 2.

== History ==
In 1987, when the Guangzhou Municipal Government along with SYSTRA started planning a metro system, four proposals appeared at the time. After soliciting public opinion, the plan for the "cross shaped network" was finally formed. The section of the north–south L-shaped line between Xinshi to Chigang stations in the proposal became the core initial section of Line 2.

Final "cross-shaped" 1988 metro plan.

The "Guangzhou Urban Rapid Rail Transit Network Planning Report" (广州市城市快速轨道交通线网规划研究) published in the late 1990s had already shown intentions to split the now under construction Line 2 around Jiangtai Road with the "Seven-Line Program". It was important to note that during the publishing of this plan, sections of Line 2 were already under construction in accordance to the original cross shaped plan. As a result, the line was proposed to be split between what is today Jiangtai Road and Xiaogang stations at a later date. With Line 2 heading south to Nanzhou station but turning east and terminating near what today would be Lijiao station on Line 3. Therefore, reservations to facilitate the dismantling of the line between those Jiangtai Lu and Xiaogang were made during construction. Additionally, the report proposed that the northern section of Line 2 will be extended with two branches splitting at around what is today Lianhe Park (联和公园) where:

- One branch would along Airport Road and National Highway 106 to the, at the time proposed, new international airport
- The other branch goes along Guanghua Road to Jianggao Town, what is today a station on Line 24.

In the 2000 metro plan, the Line 2 alignment was again revised to its current alignment. The Jianggao Branch Line was removed and the section to the new airport was also reduced to what is today Jiahewanggang station additionally the section between Jiahewanggang and Sanyuanli stations was shifted east to run under the central axis of the now abandoned Old Guangzhou Baiyun International Airport site. The section north of Jiahewanggang to the new airport was replaced by a new Airport Express line that later became Line 3. The original alignment between Jiahewanggang and Sanyuanli stations would later be proposed as the now under construction Phase 2 extension of Line 14 in 2008. In the southern end of Line 2, instead of heading east, the line was redesigned to head further south to what was at the time known as Guangzhou New Passenger Station (Guangzhou South railway station). The section heading east between Nanzhou to today's Lijiao station eventually became a part of the Guangfo Line.

=== Initial Section ===
On December 29, 2002, the first section of Line 2 from Sanyuanli to Xiaogang opened for trial operation with nine stations. The section is 8.9 kilometres (5.53 mi) long. Upon opening, it was the first metro line in Mainland China to be equipped with platform screen doors, central air conditioning, rigid overhead line and contactless transit card faregates. On June 28, 2003, the section from Xiaogang to Pazhou were put into service. Fully completing the first phase of Line 2, with a length of 18.28 kilometres (11.36 mi). The total cost of Line 2's first phase was estimated to be 11.309 billion yuan, with an average cost of 486 million yuan per kilometer.

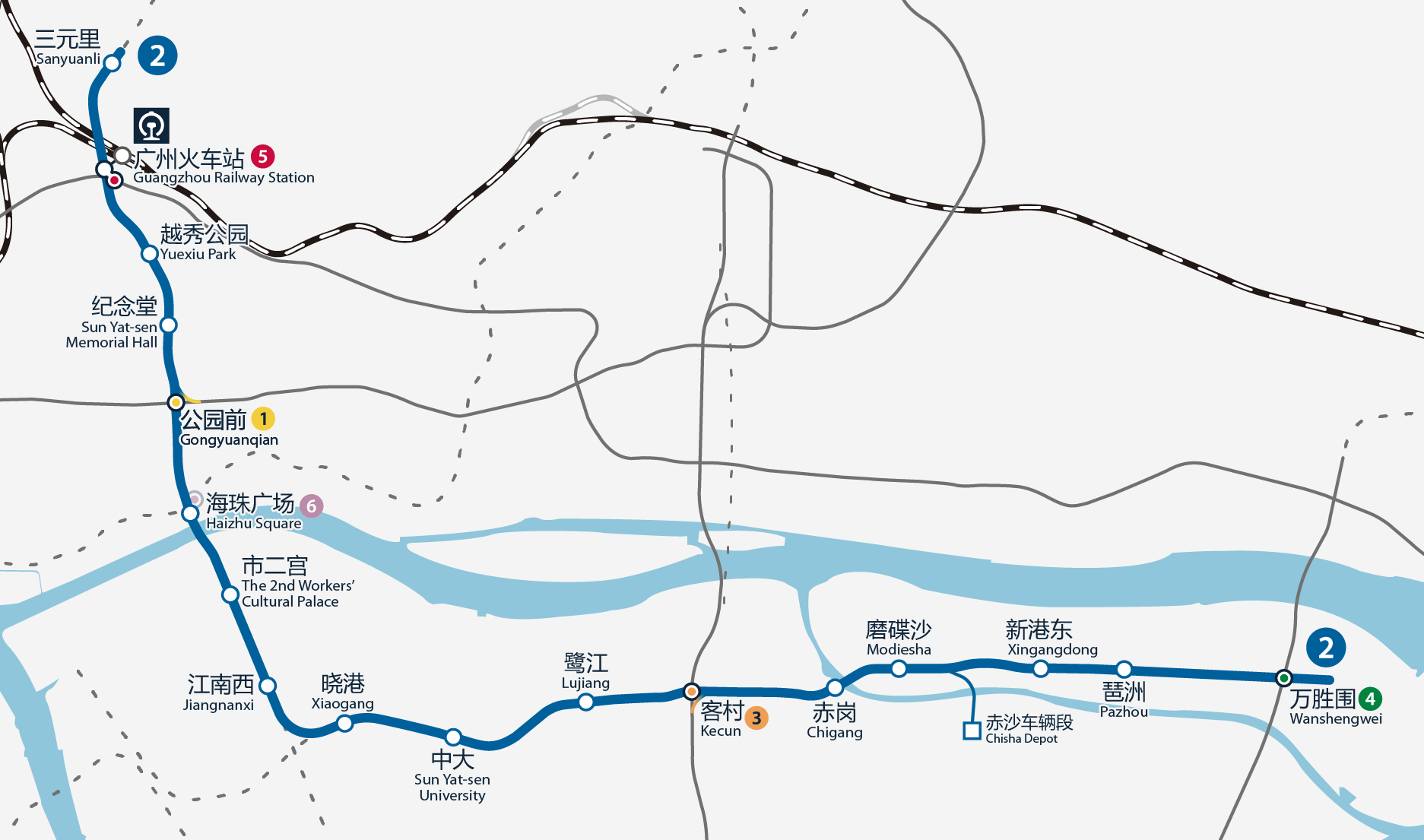
The initial alignment of Line 2 Phase I drawn to scale.

=== Line 2-8 realignment project ===
During the construction of the first phase of Line 2 there were already plans to modify its alignment. In June 2007, the project was formally approved by the National Development and Reform Commission, and started construction in August. The project will dismantle the original L-shaped Line 2 and extend it to the south, west and north; transforming Line 2 into a north–south line and spinning off the east–west section into Line 8. The total estimated cost of the project is 14.729 billion yuan. In 2010, the entire Line 2 from Sanyuanli Station to Wanshengwei Station was suspended from September 22 to 24 and preparations were made to switch the trackage to the new section heading south to Guangzhou South railway station. The project won the 17th China Civil Engineering Zhan Tianyou Award.

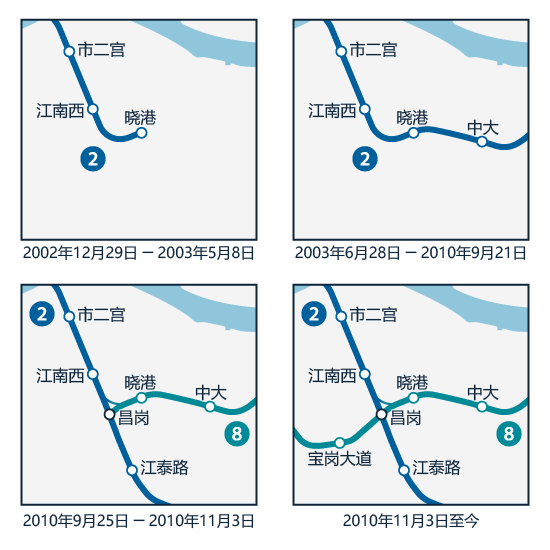
Map of route changes in the area between Jiangnanxi to Xiaogang from 2002 to its present configuration.

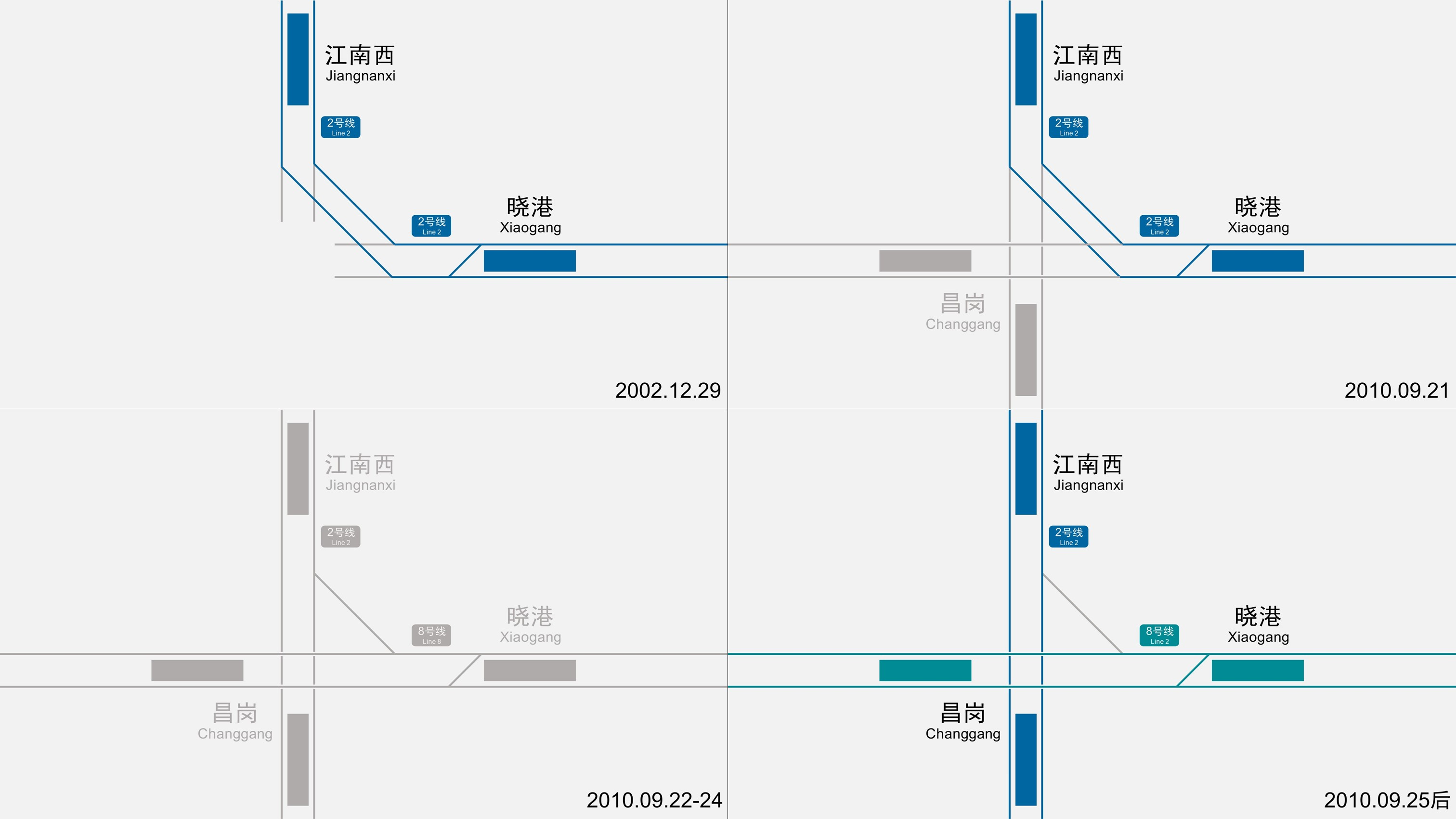
Track configuration in the area between Jiangnanxi to Xiaogang from 2002 to its present configuration.

Segment	Commencement	Length	Station(s)	Name
Xiaogang — Sanyuanli	29 December 2002	8.9 km (5.53 mi)	9	(initial phase)
Pazhou — Xiaogang	28 June 2003	9.0 km (5.59 mi)	7	Pazhou extension
Wanshengwei — Pazhou	26 December 2005	1.8 km (1.12 mi)	1	Wanshengwei extension
Xiaogang — Wanshengwei	21 September 2010	−10.8 km (−6.71 mi)	-9	Line 2 & 8 realignment project
Sanyuanli — Jiahewanggang	25 September 2010	10.3 km (6.40 mi)	7	Realignment northern extension
Guangzhou South — Jiangnanxi	25 September 2010	12.7 km (7.89 mi)	9	Realignment southern extension

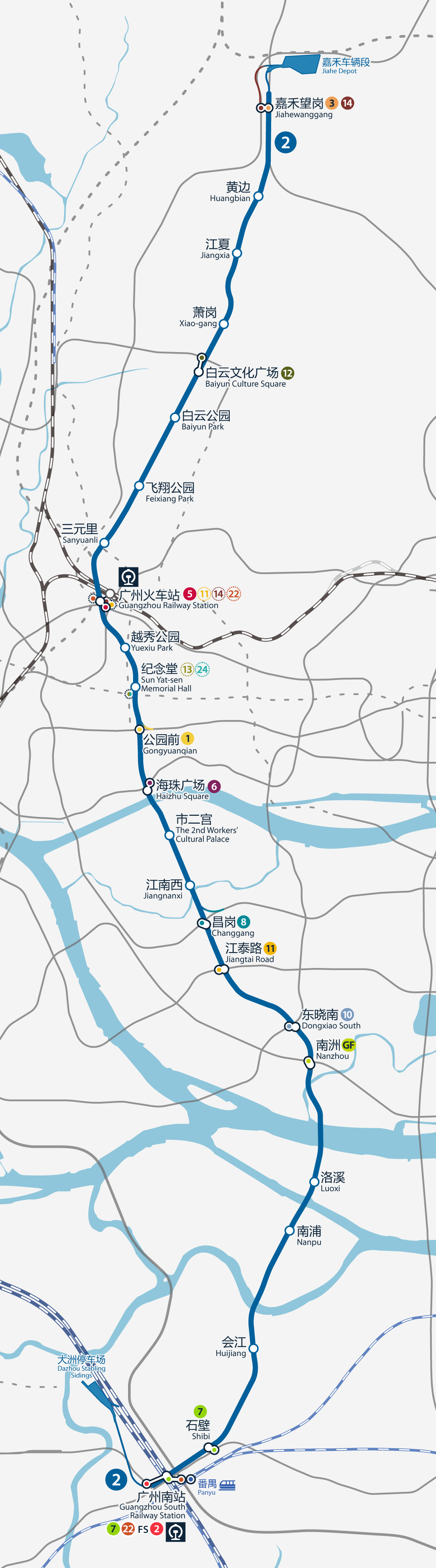
Line 2 drawn to scale

== Service routes ==
- Guangzhou South Railway Station — Jiahewanggang
- Jiangtai Road — Jiahewanggang

== Stations ==
Service routes		Station No.	Station name		Connections	Future Connections	Distance km		Location
Service routes		Station No.	English	Chinese	Connections	Future Connections	Distance km		Location
●		201	Guangzhou South Railway Station	广州南站	7 701 22 2203; 2 F227; IZQ Guangzhu; PYA Guangzhao GH ER		0.00	0.00	Panyu
●		202	Shibi	石壁	7 702		1.24	1.24	Panyu
●		203	Huijiang	会江			2.27	3.51	Panyu
●		204	Nanpu	南浦			2.46	5.97	Panyu
●		205	Luoxi	洛溪			1.17	7.14	Panyu
●		206	Nanzhou	南洲	Guangfo GF24		2.31	9.45	Haizhu
●		207	Dongxiao South	东晓南	10 1006		1.02	10.47	Haizhu
●	●	208	Jiangtai Road	江泰路	11 1126		1.90	12.37	Haizhu
●	●	209	Changgang	昌岗	8 819		1.15	13.52	Haizhu
●	●	210	Jiangnanxi	江南西			0.85	14.37	Haizhu
●	●	211	The 2nd Workers' Cultural Palace	市二宫		28	1.08	15.45	Haizhu
●	●	212	Haizhu Square	海珠广场	6 610		1.05	16.50	Yuexiu
●	●	213	Gongyuanqian	公园前	1 109		1.26	17.76	Yuexiu
●	●	214	Sun Yat-sen Memorial Hall	纪念堂		13 1310 24	0.76	18.52	Yuexiu
●	●	215	Yuexiu Park	越秀公园			0.90	19.42	Yuexiu
●	●	216	Guangzhou Railway Station	广州火车站	5 506; GS GZQ	11 1114 14 1401 22	1.03	20.45	Yuexiu
●	●	217	Sanyuanli	三元里			1.41	21.86	Baiyun
●	●	218	Feixiang Park	飞翔公园			1.17	23.03	Baiyun
●	●	219	Baiyun Park	白云公园			1.62	24.65	Baiyun
●	●	220	Baiyun Culture Square	白云文化广场	12 1208		1.03	25.68	Baiyun
●	●	221	Xiao-gang	萧岗			1.04	26.72	Baiyun
●	●	222	Jiangxia	江夏			1.55	28.27	Baiyun
●	●	223	Huangbian	黄边			1.25	29.52	Baiyun
●	●	224	Jiahewanggang	嘉禾望岗	3 325 14 1409		1.82	31.34	Baiyun

== Headways ==
Date	Period	Termini	Hours	Frequency	Set Type
Monday thru Friday	AM Peak	Jiangtai Road—Sanyuanli	7:30–9:30	2 m 30 s	2 long-trains 1 short-train
Monday thru Friday	AM Peak	Guangzhou South Railway Station—Jiangtai RoadSanyuanli—Jiahewanggang	7:30–9:30	3 m 30 s	2 long-trains 1 short-train
Monday thru Friday	PM Peak	Guangzhou South Railway Station—Jiahewanggang	16:30–19:45	2 m 50 s ~3 m 30 s	Long-trains only
Monday thru Friday	Mid	Guangzhou South Railway Station—Jiahewanggang	7:00–7:30 9:30–16:30 19:45–21:30	3 m 30 s	Long-trains only
Monday thru Friday	Low	Guangzhou South Railway Station—Jiahewanggang	6:00–7:00 21:30–23:30	6 m 30 s	Long-trains only
Saturday & Sunday	Peak	Guangzhou South Railway Station—Jiahewanggang	11:00–19:15	3 m	Long-trains only
Saturday & Sunday	Mid	Guangzhou South Railway Station—Jiahewanggang	7:00–11:00 19:15–21:30	3 m 30 s	Long-trains only
Saturday & Sunday	Low	Guangzhou South Railway Station—Jiahewanggang	6:00–7:00 21:30–23:30	6 m 30 s	Long-trains only
