= Sanyuanli station =

Guangzhou Metro station

Coordinates: 23.159402°N 113.256851°E

Sanyuanli 三元里
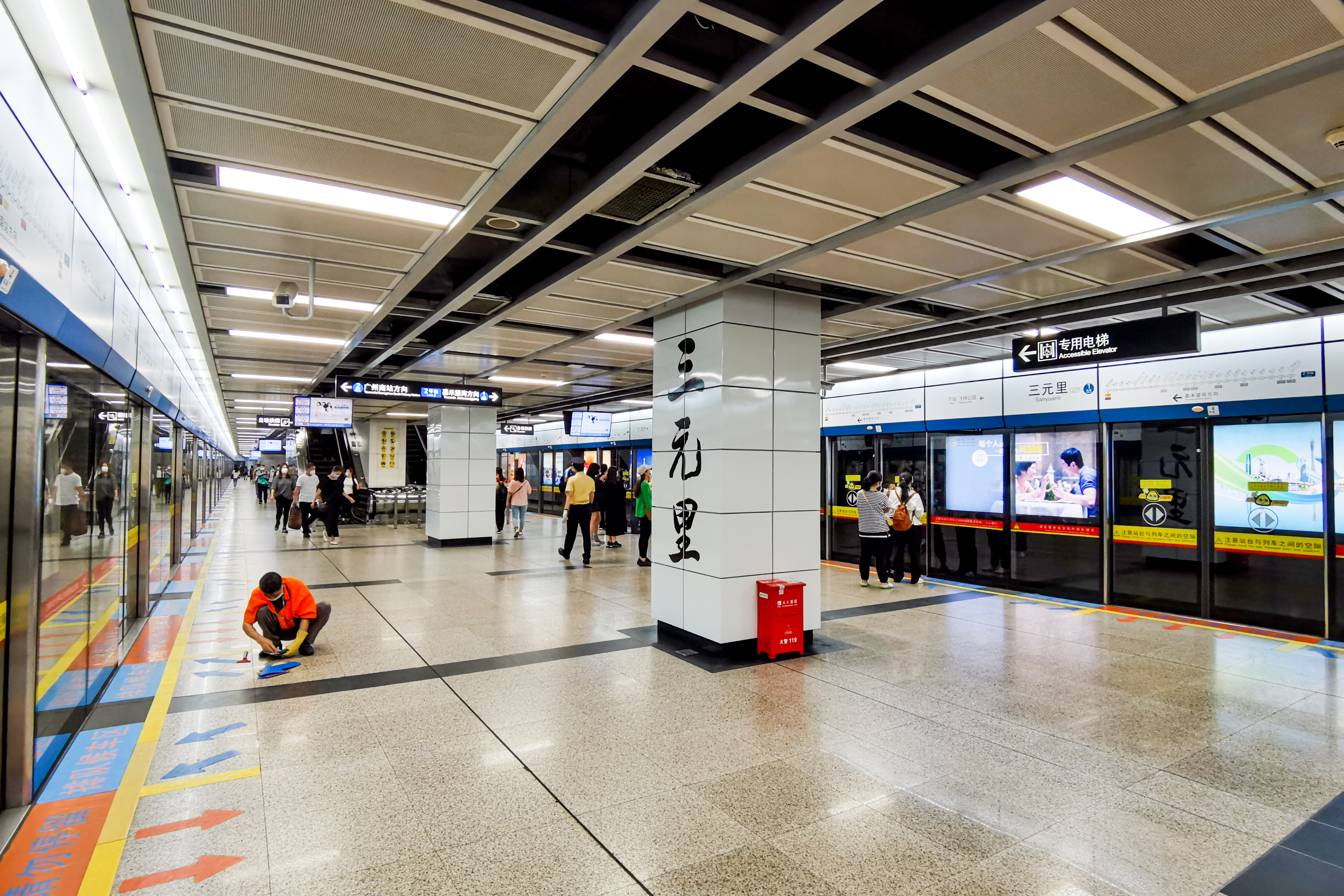

Chinese name
- Chinese: 三元里站
Transcriptions
Standard Mandarin
- Hanyu Pinyin: Sānyuánlǐ Zhàn
Yue: Cantonese
- Yale Romanization: Sāam'yùhnléi Jaahm
- Jyutping: Saam1jyun4lei5-2 Zaam6
- Hong Kong Romanization: Sam Yuen Lei station

General information
- Location: Sanyuanli, Baiyun District, Guangzhou, Guangdong; China
- Operated by: Guangzhou Metro Co. Ltd.
- Line: Line 2
- Platforms: 2 (1 island platform)

Construction
- Structure type: Underground

Other information
- Station code: 217

History
- Opened: 29 December 2002; 23 years ago

Services
Preceding station	Guangzhou Metro	Following station
Guangzhou Railway Station towards Guangzhou South Railway Station	Line 2	Feixiang Park towards Jiahewanggang
Location

Sanyuanli Station (Chinese: 三元里站; Jyutping: saam1 jyun4 lei2 zaam6; Cantonese Yale: Sāam'yùhnléi Jaahm) is a metro station of Line 2 of the Guangzhou Metro. It started operations on the 29th of December, 2002. It is located at Sanyuanli in Baiyun District. It is adjacent to the Sanyuanli Anti-British Resistance Monument (三元里抗英纪念碑), Sanyuanli Coach Terminal (三元里客运站), Guangzhou Airport Expressway (广州机场高速公路) and Jingzhu Expressway.
