= Huangbian station =

Guangzhou Metro station

Coordinates: 23.22167°N 113.28749°E

Huangbian 黄边
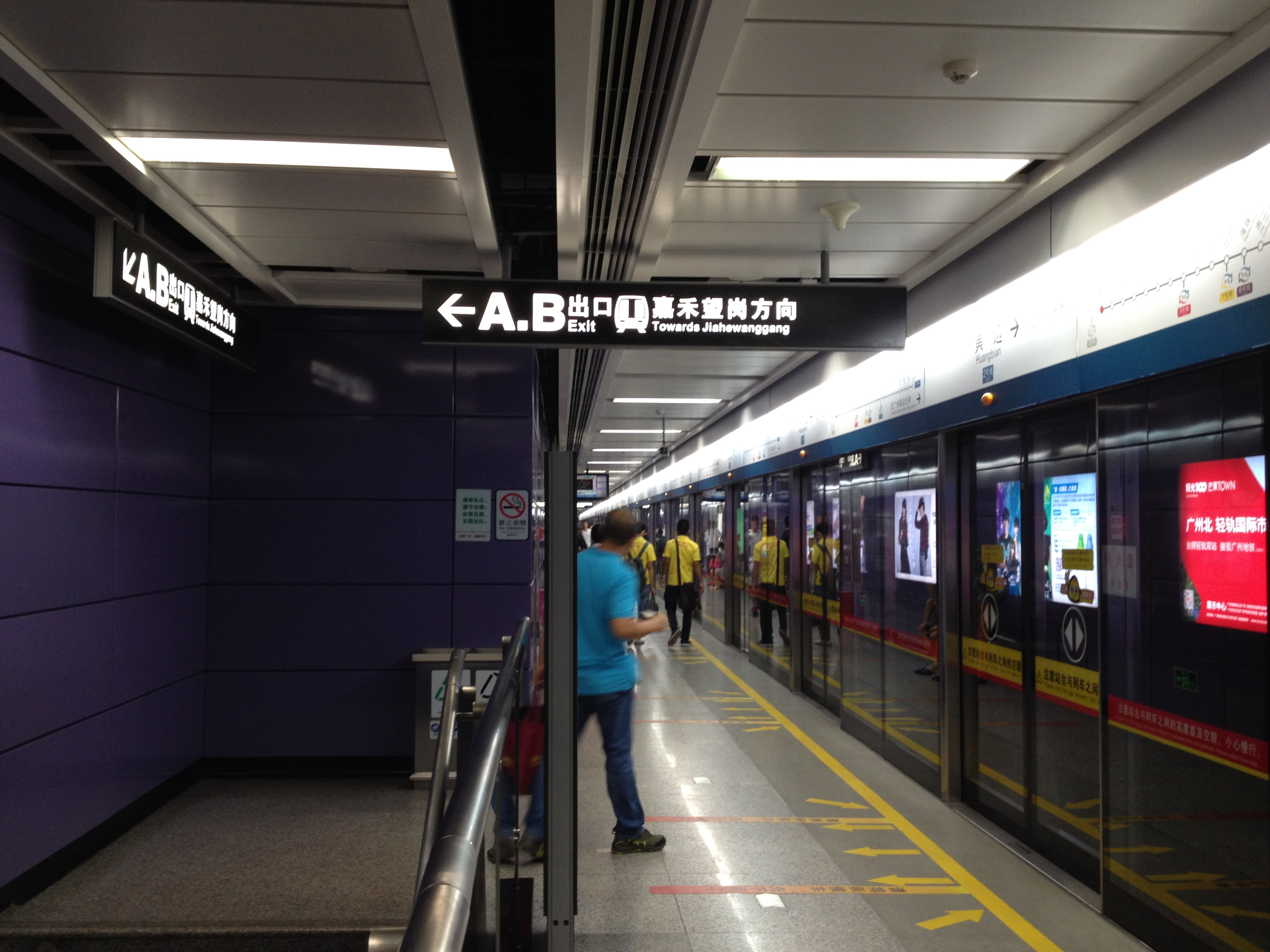

Chinese name
- Simplified Chinese: 黄边站
- Traditional Chinese: 黃邊站
Transcriptions
Standard Mandarin
- Hanyu Pinyin: Huángbiān Zhàn
Yue: Cantonese
- Yale Romanization: Wòhngbīn Jaahm
- Jyutping: Wong4bin1 Zaam6
- Hong Kong Romanization: Wong Pin station

General information
- Location: Baiyun District, Guangzhou, Guangdong; China
- Operated by: Guangzhou Metro Co. Ltd.
- Line: Line 2
- Platforms: 2 (2 side platforms)

Construction
- Structure type: Underground

Other information
- Station code: 223

History
- Opened: 25 September 2010; 15 years ago

Services
Preceding station	Guangzhou Metro	Following station
Jiangxia towards Guangzhou South Railway Station	Line 2	Jiahewanggang Terminus
Location

Huangbian Station (Chinese: 黄边站; Jyutping: wong4 bin1 zaam6; Cantonese Yale: Wòhngbīn Jaahm), called Shanglinzhen Station during planning, is a metro station on Line 2 of the Guangzhou Metro. It is located at the underground of the south of Huangbian North Road in the Baiyun District of Guangzhou. The station started operation on 25 September, 2010.
