= Jiahewanggang station =

Guangzhou Metro interchange station

Coordinates: 23.2397°N 113.283656°E

Jiahewanggang 嘉禾望岗
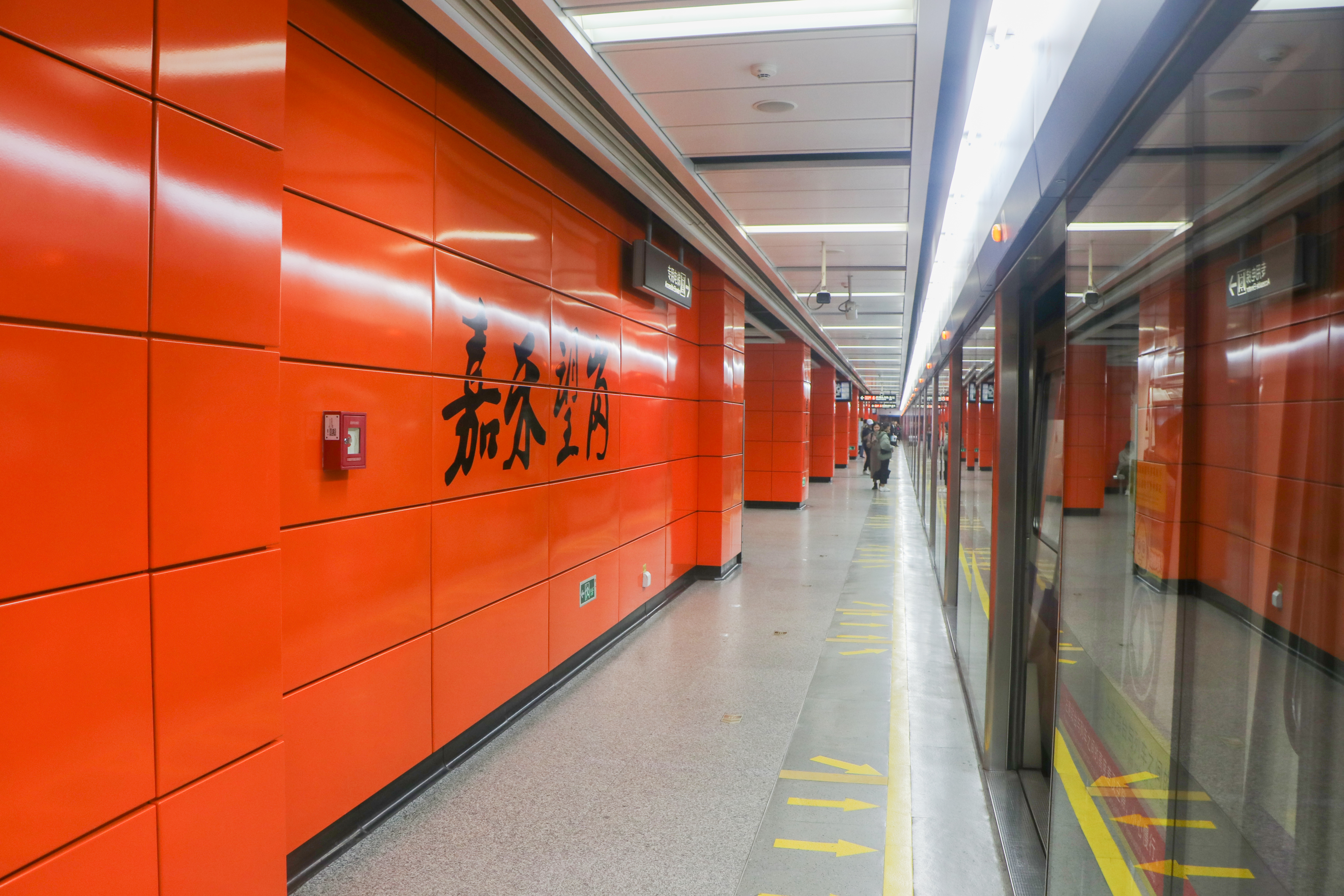
- Platform 2

Chinese name
- Simplified Chinese: 嘉禾望岗站
- Traditional Chinese: 嘉禾望崗站
Transcriptions
Standard Mandarin
- Hanyu Pinyin: Jiāhéwànggǎng Zhàn
Yue: Cantonese
- Yale Romanization: Gāwòhmohnggōng Jaahm
- Jyutping: Gaa1wo4mong6gong1 Zaam6
- Hong Kong Romanization: Ka Wo Mong Kong station

General information
- Location: Konggang Avenue (空港大道) and Wanggang Avenue (望岗大道); Baiyun District, Guangzhou, Guangdong; China
- Operated by: Guangzhou Metro Co. Ltd.
- Lines: Line 2; Line 3; Line 14
- Platforms: 6 (3 island platforms)
- Tracks: 6

Construction
- Structure type: Underground
- Accessible: Yes

Other information
- Station code: 224 325 1409

History
- Opened: Line 2: 25 September 2010; 15 years ago Line 3: 30 October 2010; 15 years ago Line 14: 28 December 2018; 7 years ago

Services
Preceding station	Guangzhou Metro	Following station
Huangbian towards Guangzhou South Railway Station	Line 2	Terminus
Baiyundadaobei towards Haibang	Line 3	Longgui towards Airport North (Terminal 2)
Pengbian towards Lejia Road	Line 14	Baiyun Dongping towards Dongfeng
Location

Jiahewanggang Station (Chinese: 嘉禾望岗站; Jyutping: gaa1 wo4 mong6 gong1 zaam6; Cantonese Yale: Gāwòhmohnggōng Jaahm), formerly known as Jiahe Station (嘉禾站; gaa1 wo4 zaam6; Gāwòh Jaahm) during its planning stages, is an interchange station between Line 2, Line 3, and Line 14 of the Guangzhou Metro. It is also the northern terminus of Line 2, and the former southern terminus of Line 14 before Phase 2. It is located underground, just northwest of Lingnan New World Garden in Baiyun District of Guangzhou. It started operation on 25 September 2010. On 28 December 2018, Line 14 (Phase 1) opened. Jiahewanggang became the interchange station of Line 2, Line 3 and Line 14.

This station provides cross-platform interchange between Line 2 and Line 3, with Line 2 stopping on the inner platforms and Line 3 stopping on the outer platforms. The Line 14 platforms are located one level below the Line 2 and Line 3 platforms.

The station was the southern terminus of the Line 14 mainline until the phase 2 extension to Lejia Road opened on 29 September 2025.

== Station layout ==
G Concourse	Lobby	Ticket Machines, Customer Service, Police Station, Safety Facilities, Toilets
B1; Equipment Area & Concourse	Line 14 Lobby	Customer Service, Vending machines, ATMs
B1; Equipment Area & Concourse	-	Station Equipment
B1; Equipment Area & Concourse	Buffer Area	Buffer area of Line 2 & 3
B2; Platforms	Platform 6	14 towards Lejia Road (Pengbian)
B2; Platforms	Island platform, doors will open on the left
B2; Platforms	Platform 5	14 towards Dongfeng (Baiyun Dongping)
B2; Platforms	Platform 3	3 towards Haibang (Baiyundadaobei)
B2; Platforms	Island platform, doors will open on the right for 2 and left for 3
B2; Platforms	Platform 2	2 towards Guangzhou South Railway Station (Huangbian)
B2; Platforms	Platform 1	2 termination platform
B2; Platforms	Island platform, doors will open on the right for 2 and left for 3
B2; Platforms	Platform 4	3 towards Airport North (Longgui)

== Gallery ==
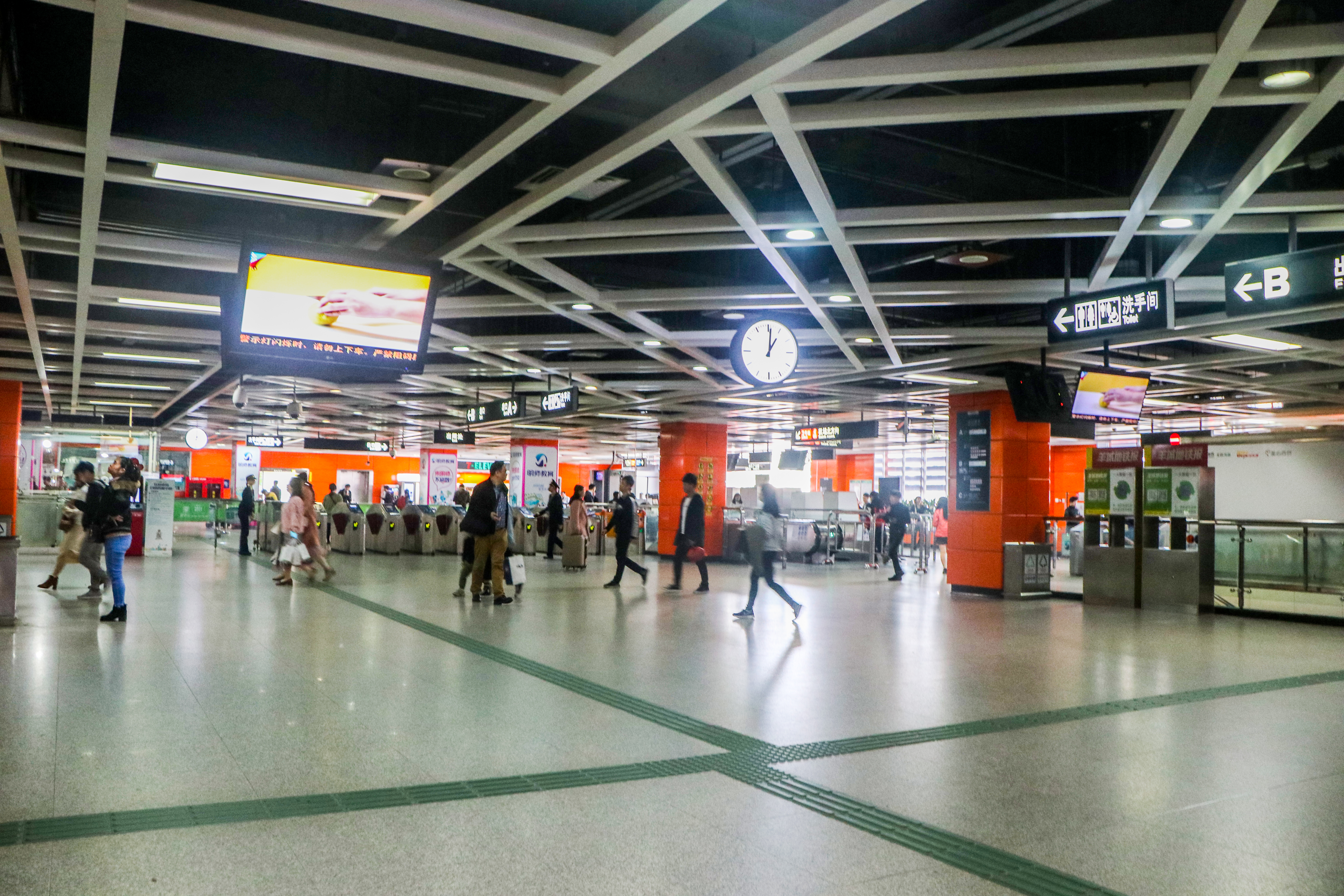
Concourse (Lines 2 and 3 section)

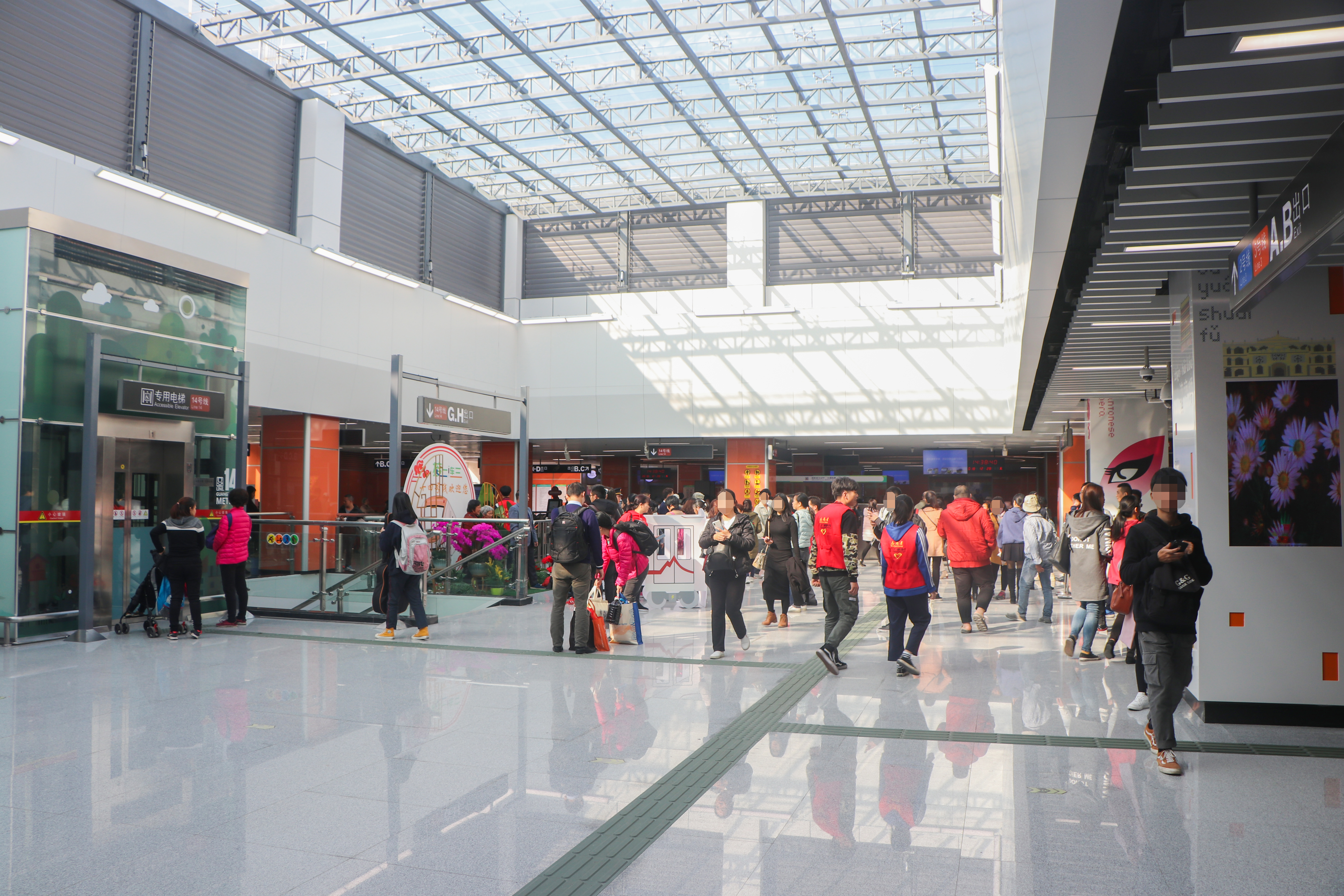
Concourse (Line 14 section)

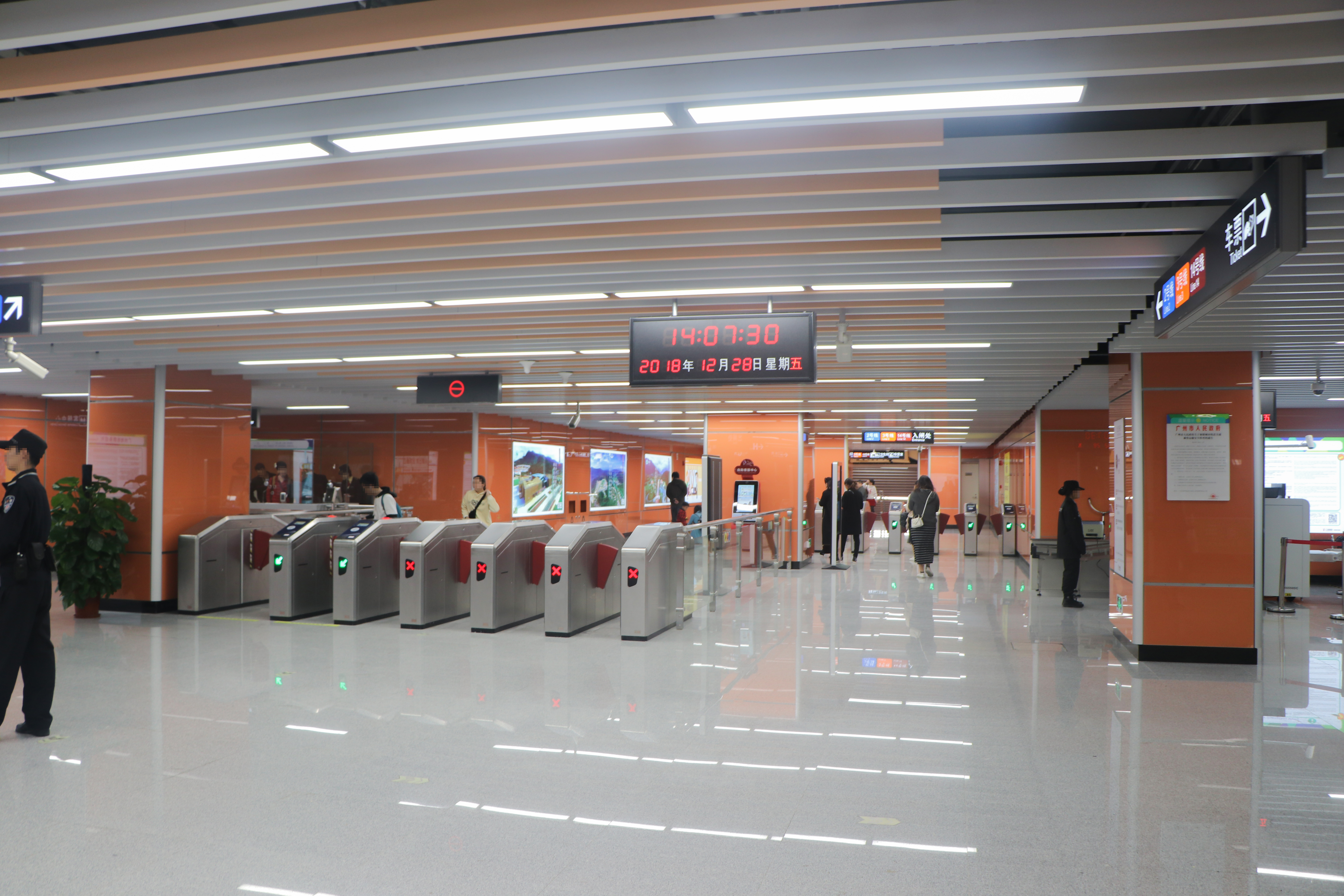
Basement concourse

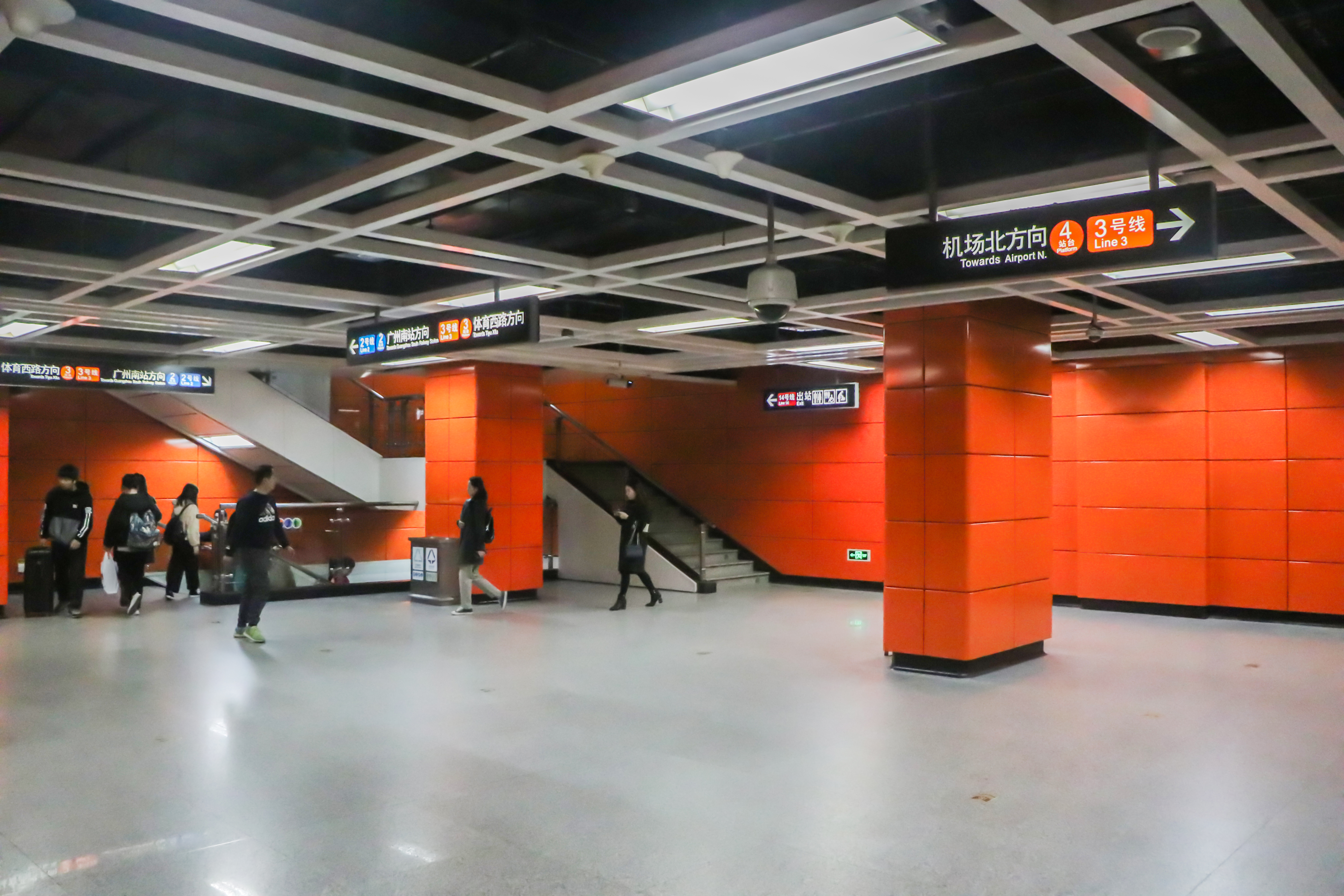
Mezzanine level for Lines 2 and 3

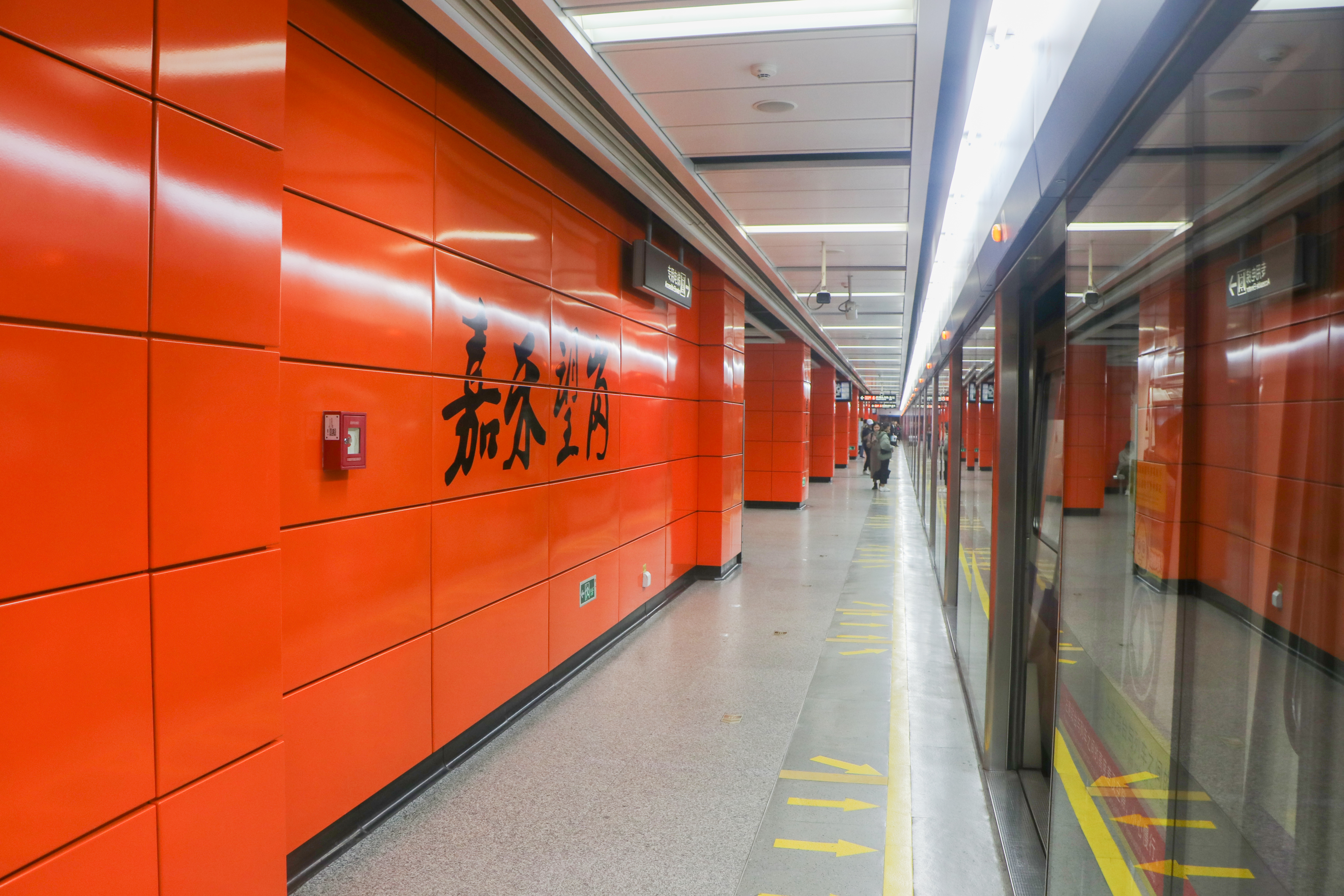
Platform 2 (Line 2 originating platform)

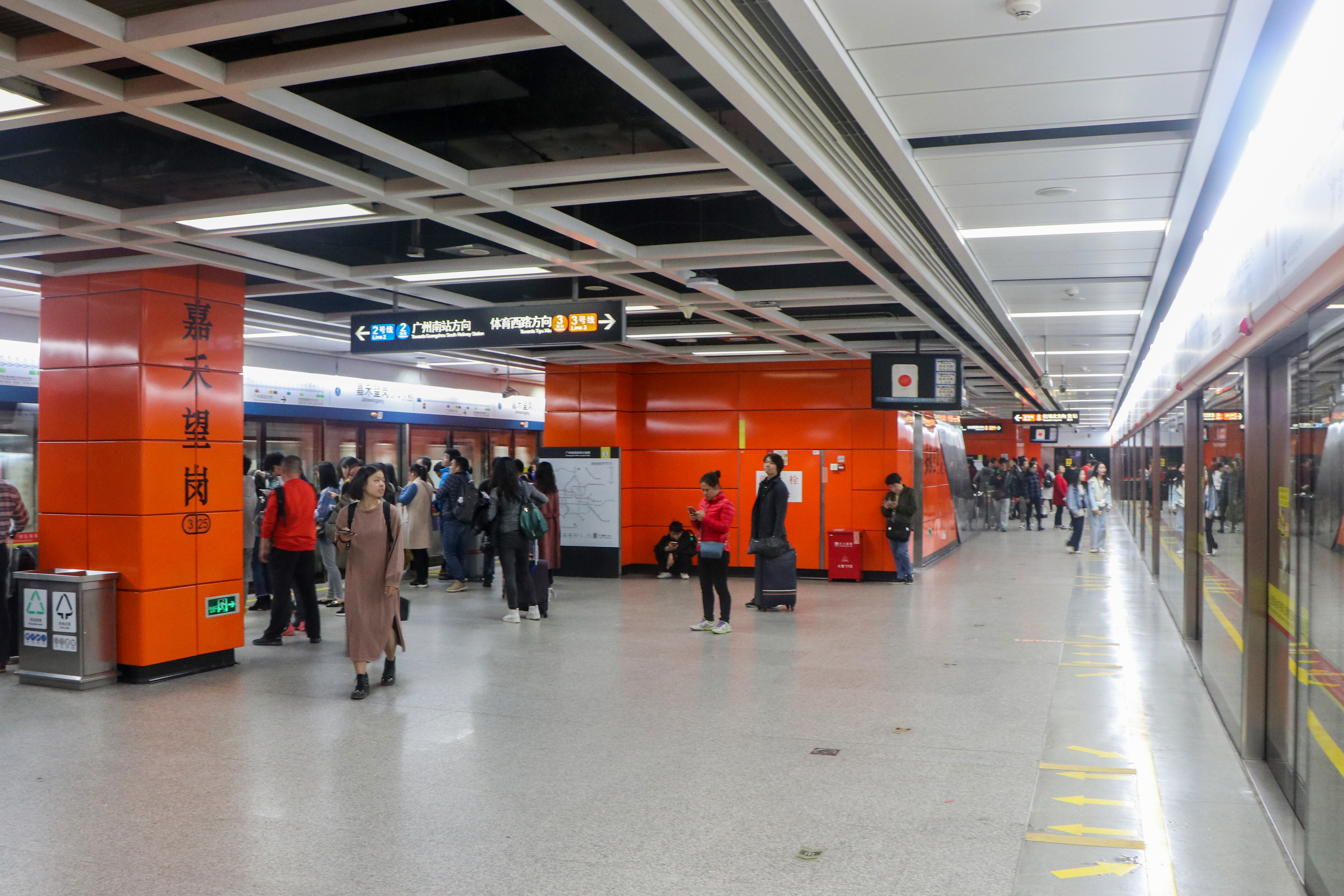
Platform 3 (Line 3 southbound platform)

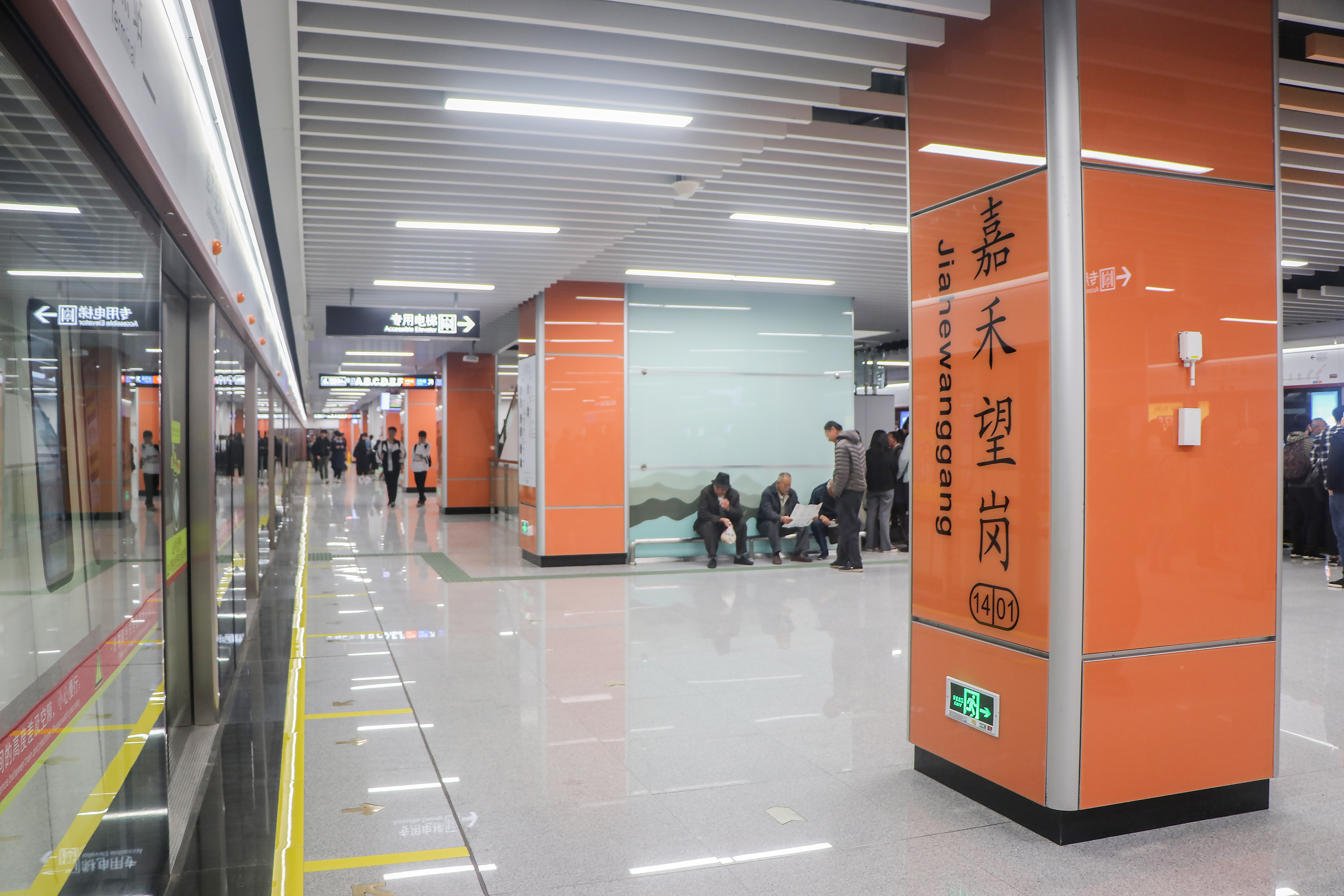
Line 14 platform
