= Guangzhou Baiyun railway station =

Railway station in Guangzhou, Guangdong

Guangzhou Baiyun 广州白云
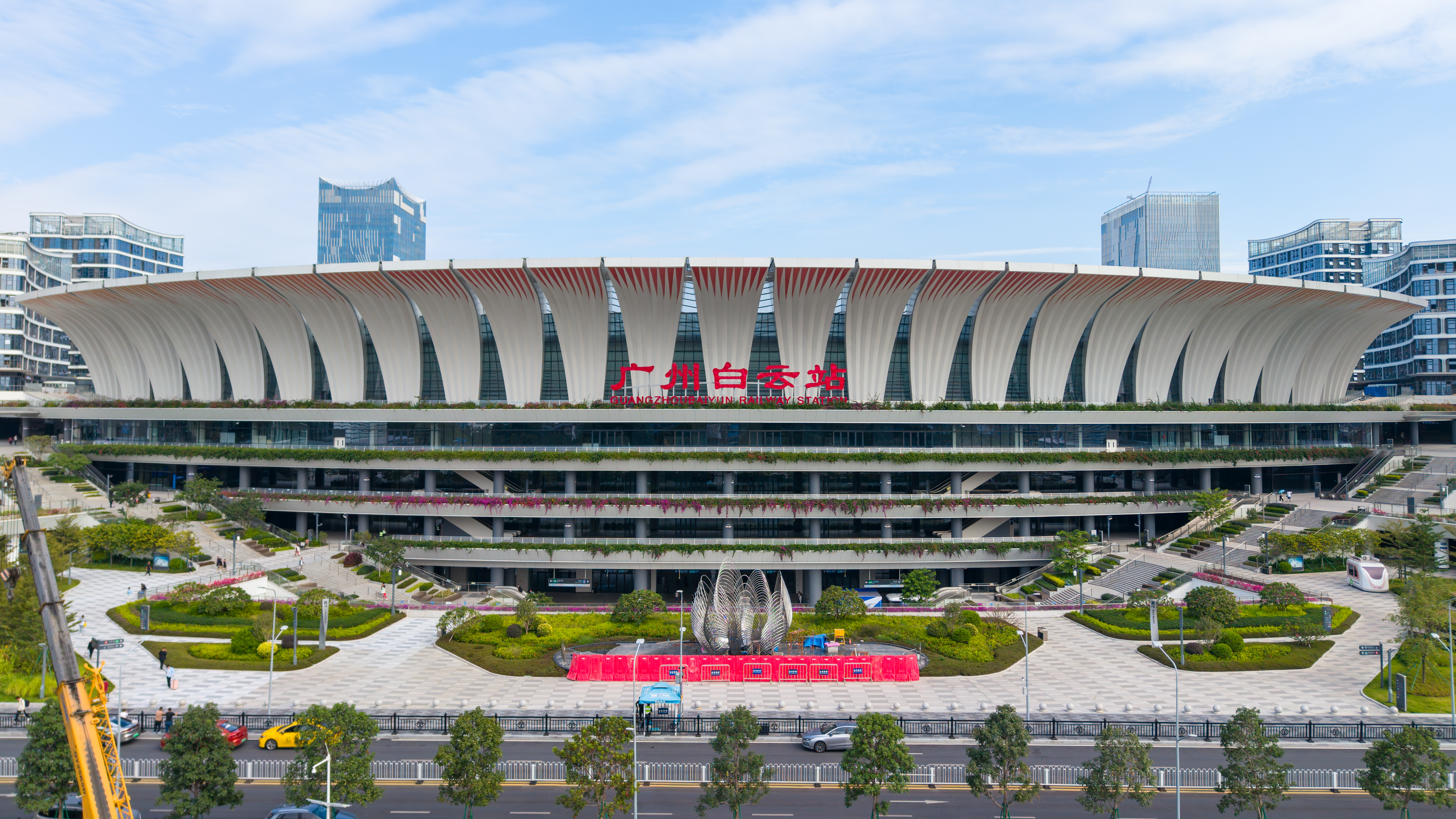
- Station exterior

General information
- Location: Baiyun District, Guangzhou, Guangdong; China
- Coordinates: 23°11′39″N 113°14′24″E
- Lines: Beijing–Guangzhou railway Beijing–Guangzhou high-speed railway (with connection line to Guangzhou North); Guangzhou–Qingyuan intercity railway Guangzhou–Zhanjiang high-speed railway
- Connections: Shitan 8 , Guangzhou Baiyun Railway Station 12

Construction
- Structure type: At-grade
- Accessible: Yes
- Architect: China Railway Siyuan Survey and Design Group; Architectural Design & Research Institute of SCUT; Nikken Sekkei; Guangzhou Urban Planning Survey & Design Institute; Guangzhou Metro Design & Research Institute

Other information
- Station code: China Railway: TMIS code: 23475; Telegraph code: GBA; Pinyin code: GZY

History
- Opened: 26 December 2023 (2 years ago) ( station); 28 January 2026 (5 months ago) ( station)

Services
Preceding station	China Railway	Following station
Guangzhou North towards Beijing West	Beijing–Guangzhou railway	Guangzhou Terminus
Preceding station	Pearl River Delta Metropolitan Region Intercity Railway	Following station
Baiyunhu towards Feixia	Guangzhou–Qingyuan intercity railway	Terminus
Location

Guangzhou Baiyun railway station (Chinese: 广州白云站; pinyin: Guǎngzhōubáiyún zhàn) is a railway station in Baiyun District, Guangzhou, Guangdong, China. It opened on 26 December 2023, and serves as a major transport hub in Guangzhou.

A spur from the Beijing–Guangzhou high-speed railway will connect to this station. It will also be the terminus of the planned Guangzhou–Zhanjiang high-speed railway. It intersects with the Beijing-Guangzhou railway and the Guangzhou–Qingyuan intercity railway.

== History ==
Guangzhou Baiyun railway station is located partially on the site of the defunct Tangxi railway station, which was originally constructed in 1916. Tangxi station's northern concourse was torn down to make way for Guangzhou Baiyun station's construction.

In July 2019, it was announced that the station would start construction in September. At the time, it was expected to be complete by 2022.

On 2 October 2020, China Railway Construction Corporation won the bid to construct the station.

== Guangzhou Metro ==
The station is served by Line 12 of the Guangzhou Metro, as well as a connection to Line 8 (via Shitan station), and will be served by lines 22 and 24.

== Gallery ==
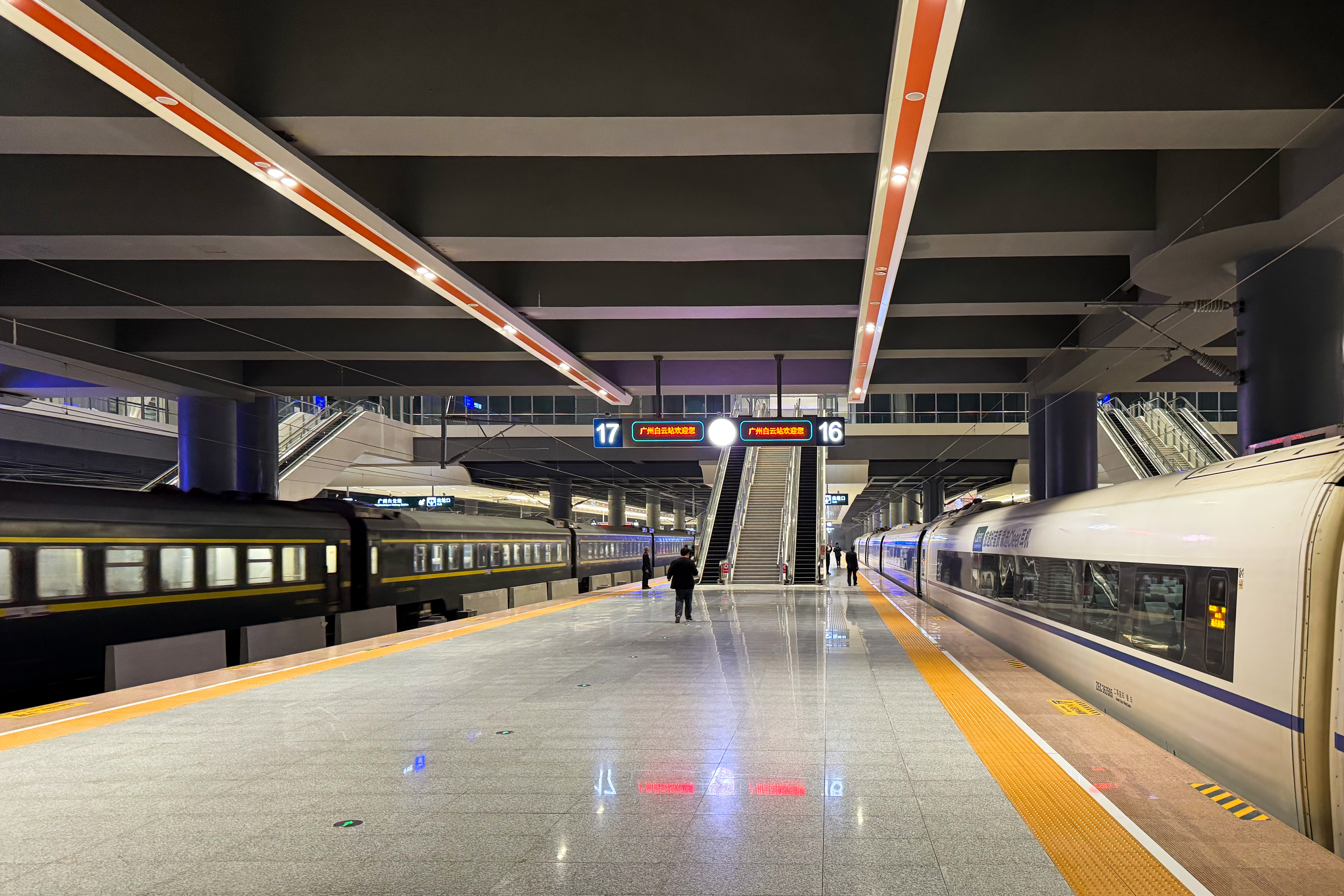
Platform 16-17

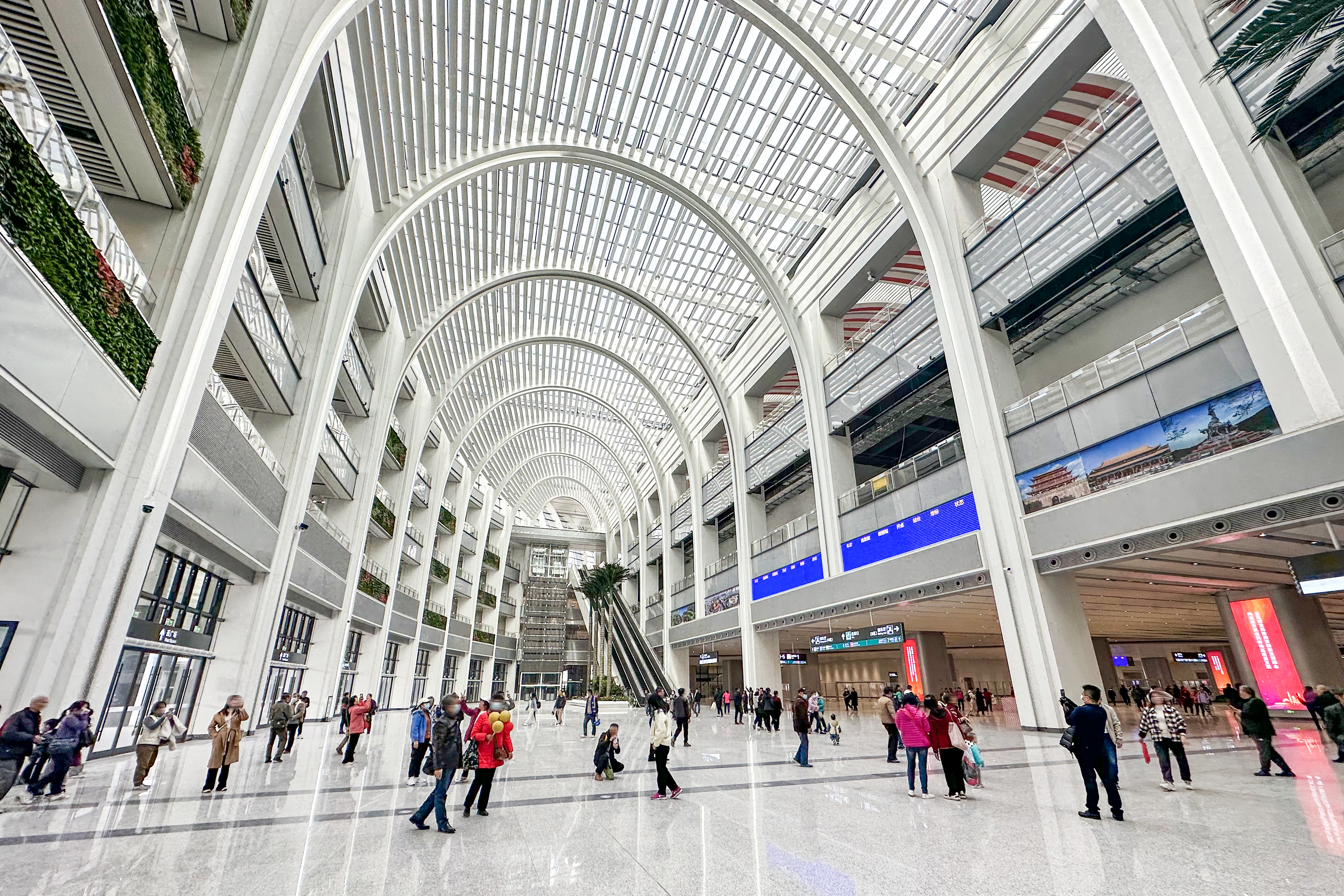
Arrival foyer

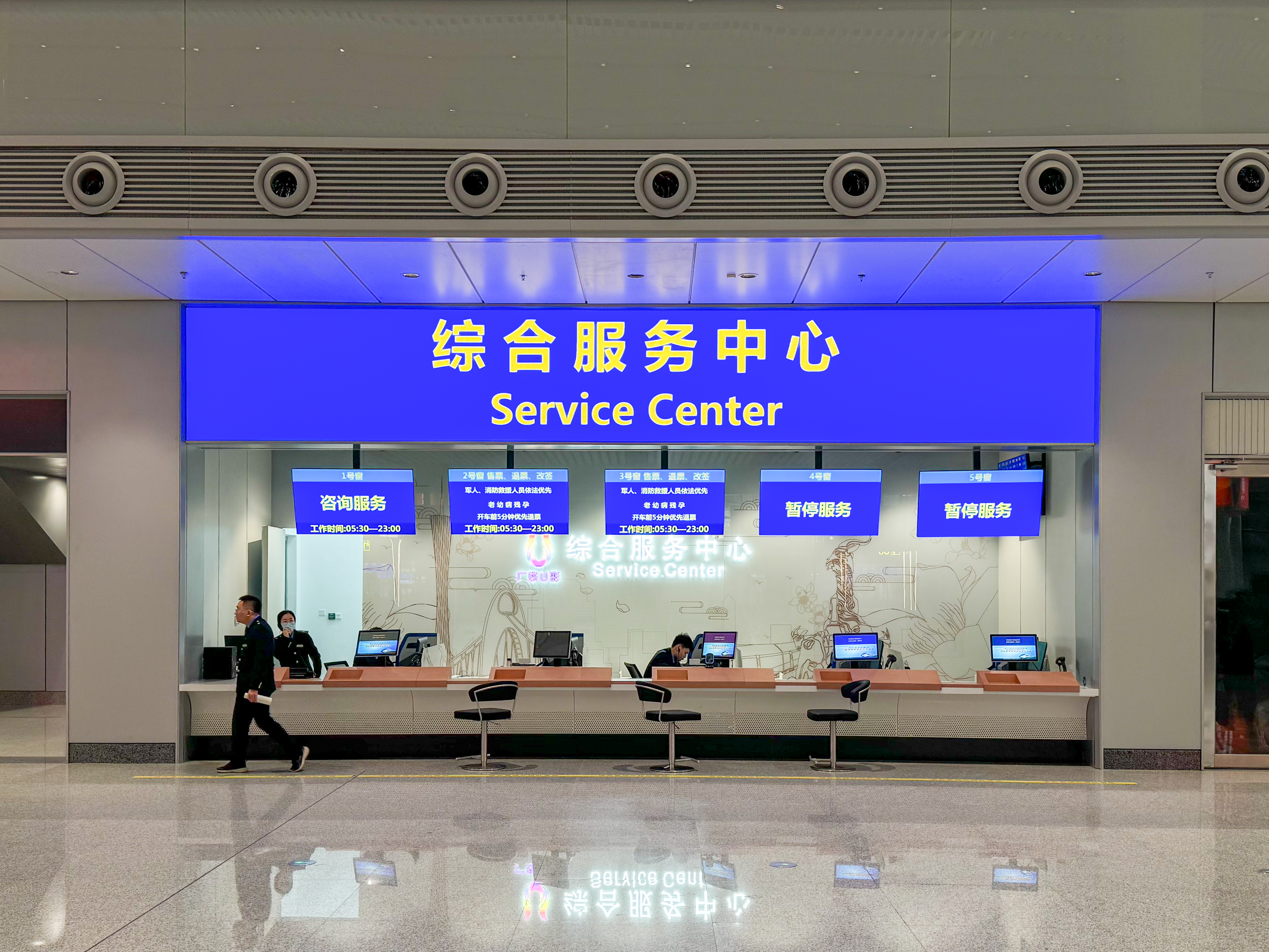
Service Centre

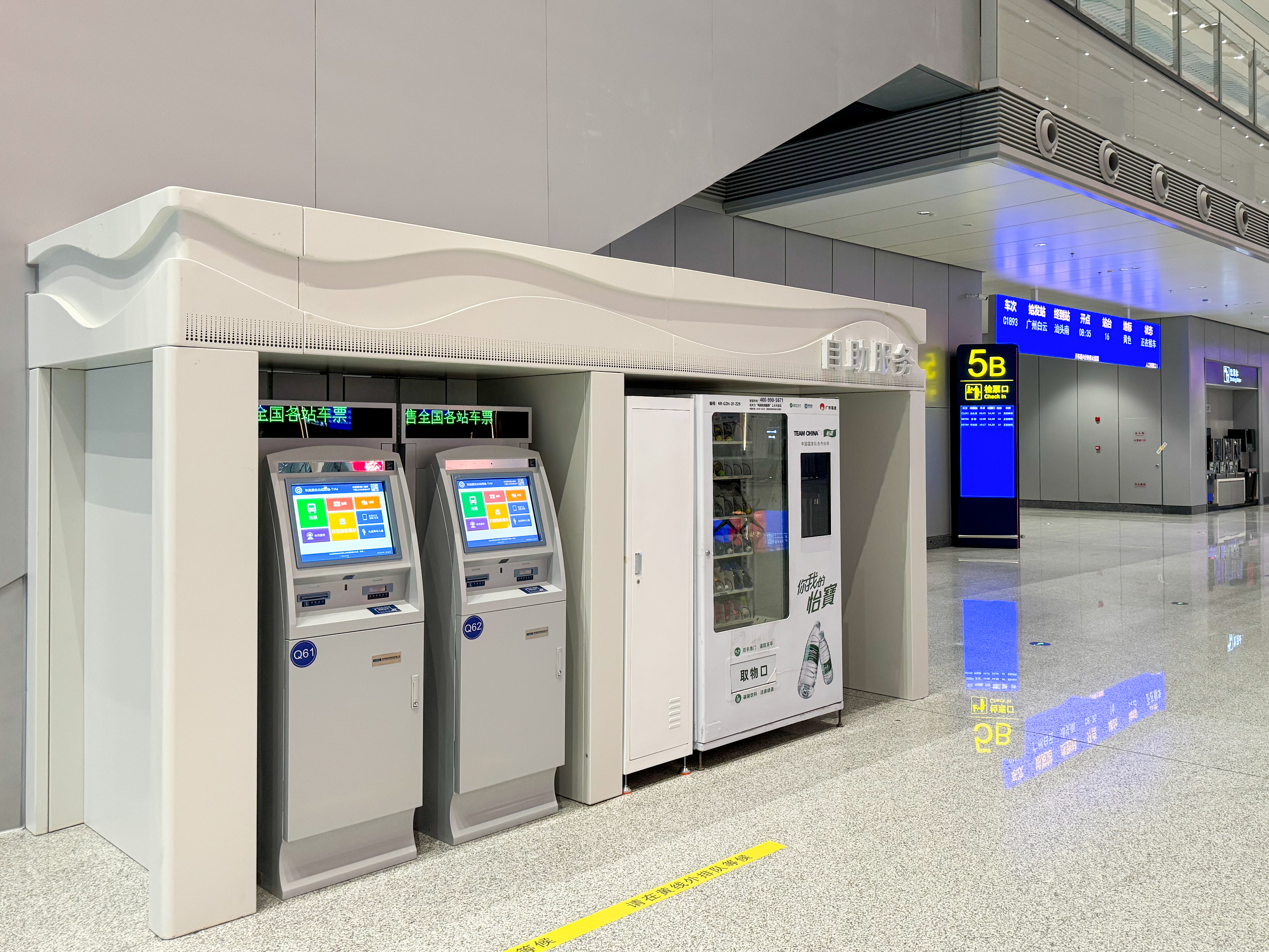
Self Service Ticket + Vending Machines

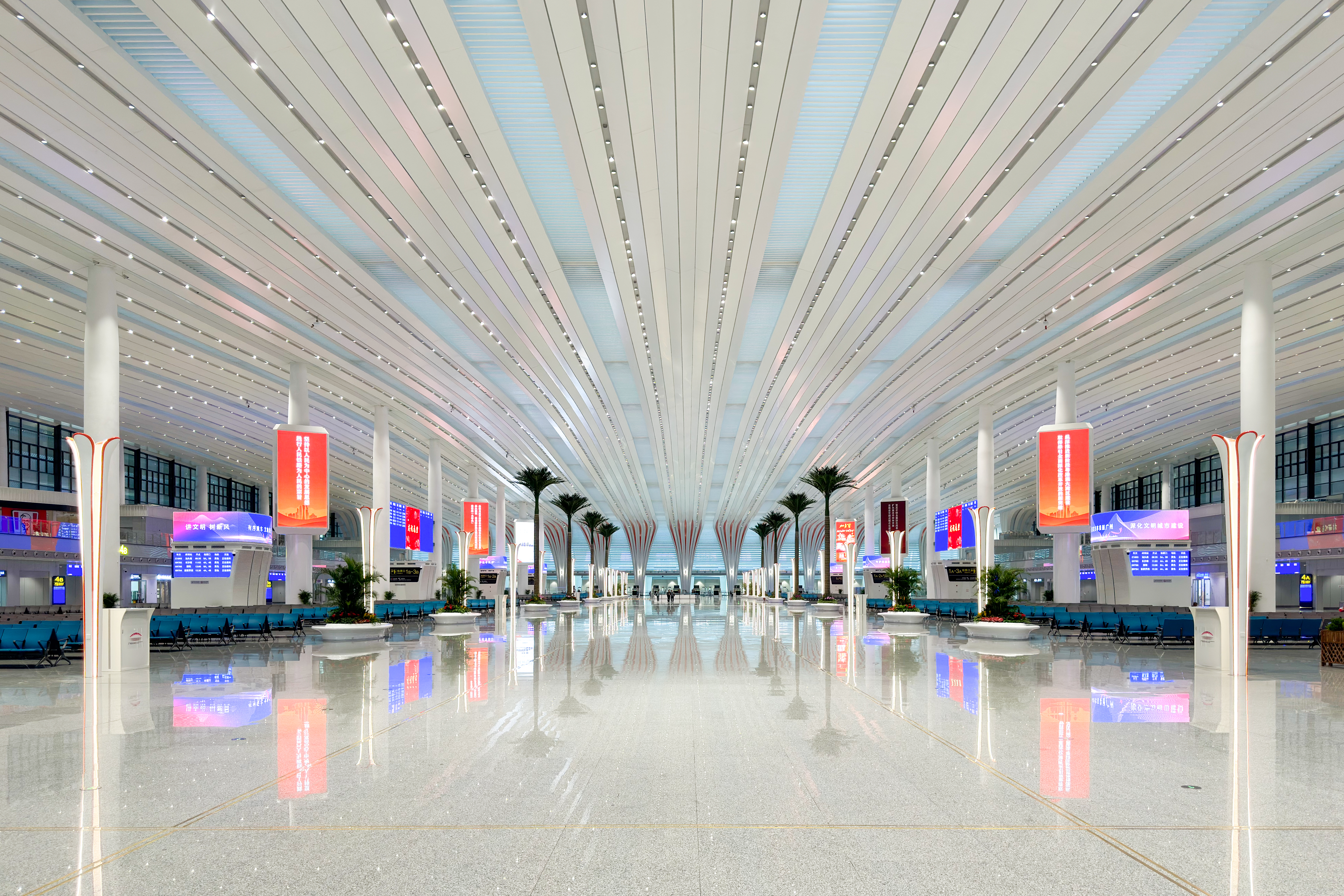
Departure Level Waiting Lounge

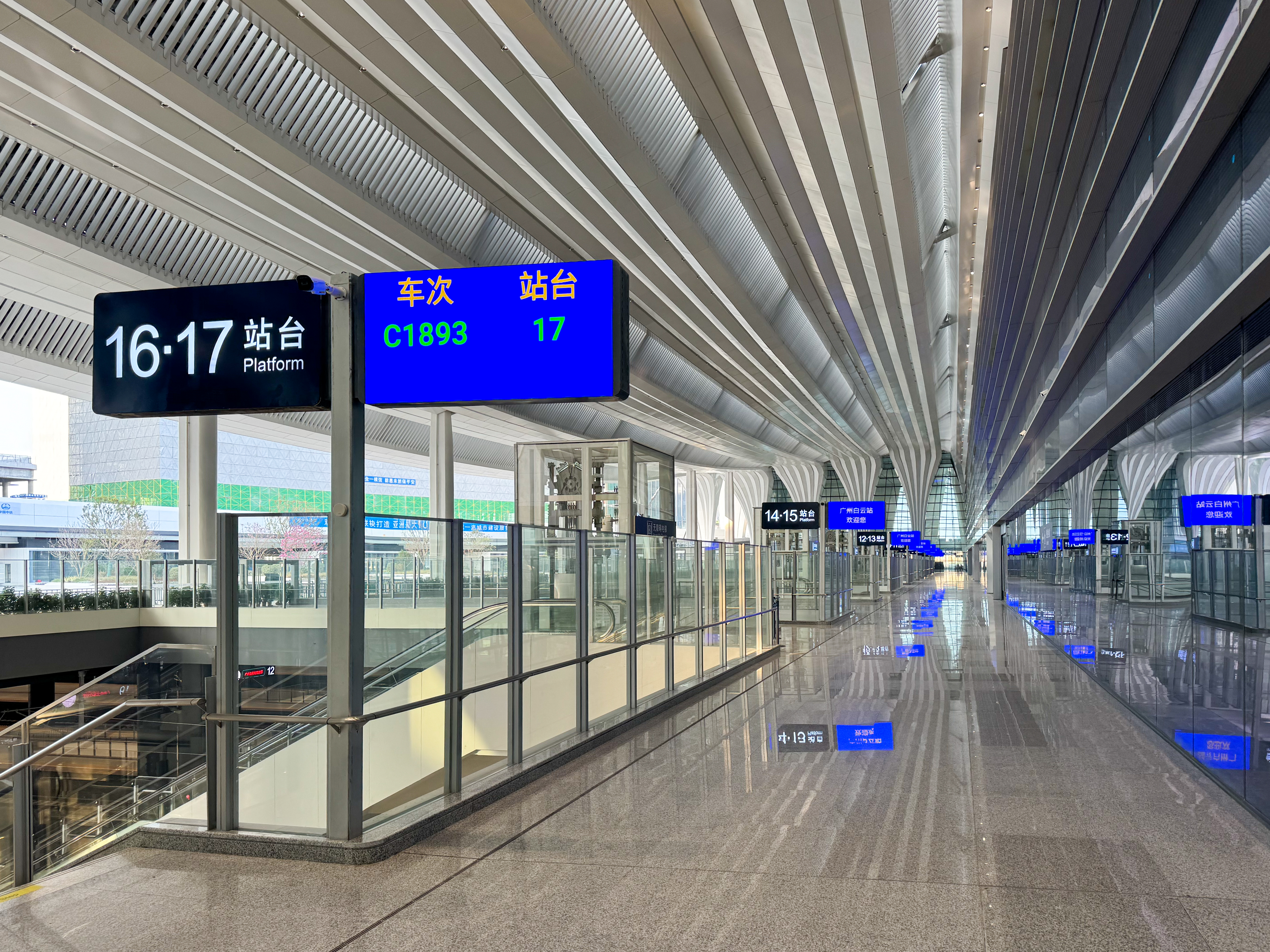
Entrance platform corridor
