= Tangchong station =

Guangzhou Metro Line 12 station

Tangchong 棠涌
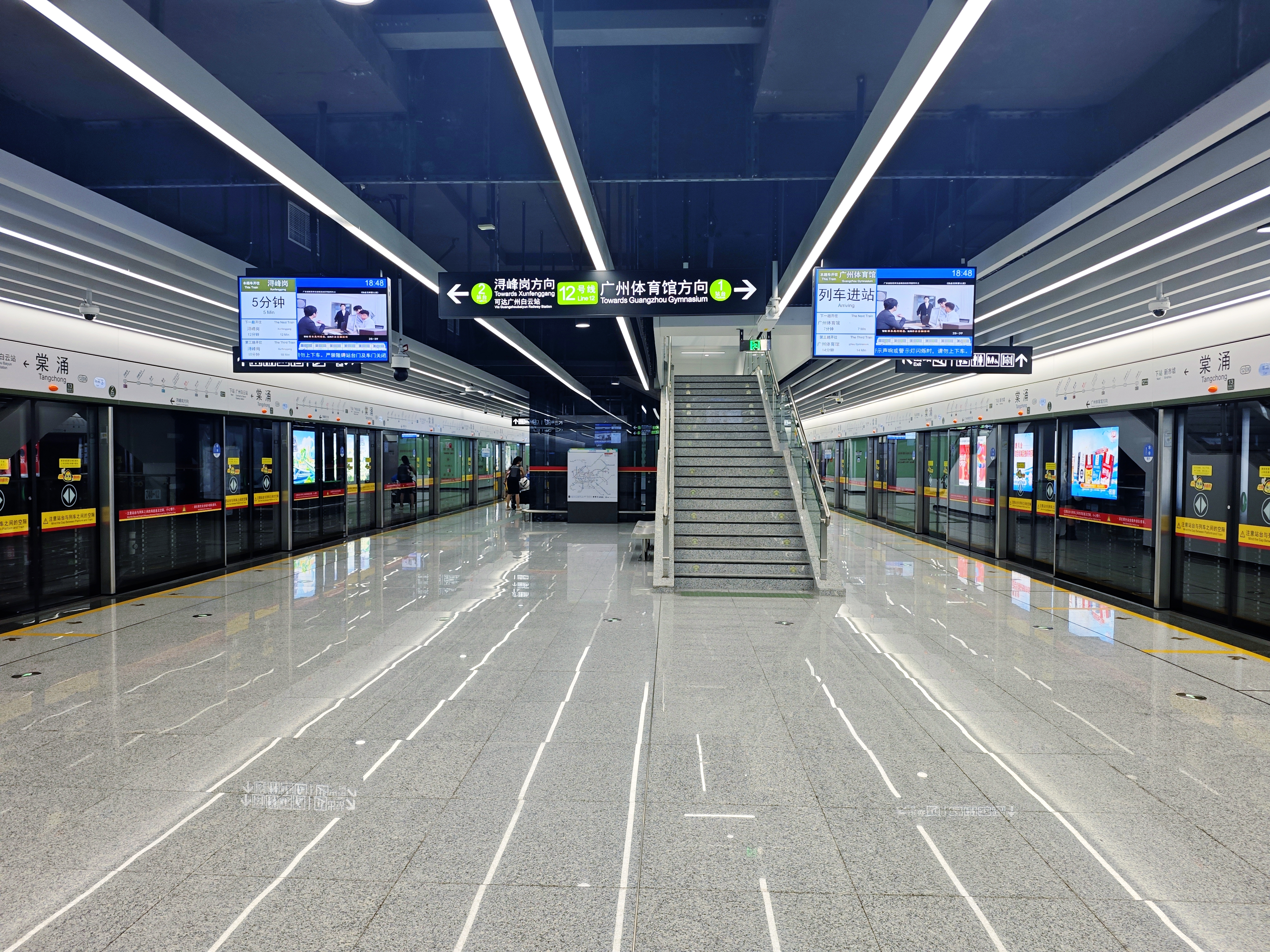
- Platform

Chinese name
- Chinese: 棠涌站
Transcriptions
Standard Mandarin
- Hanyu Pinyin: Tángchōng Zhàn
Yue: Cantonese
- Yale Romanization: Tòhngchūng Jaahm
- Jyutping: Tong^{4}cung^{1} Zaam^{6}

General information
- Location: Tanchong Road (潭涌路) between Jiayuan Street (佳园街) and Dapu South 1st Road (大埔南一路); Xinshi Subdistrict, Baiyun District, Guangzhou, Guangdong; China
- Coordinates: 23°11′55.25″N 113°14′55.21″E
- Operator: Guangzhou Metro Co. Ltd.
- Line: Line 12
- Platforms: 2 (1 island platform)
- Tracks: 2

Construction
- Structure type: Underground
- Accessible: Yes

Other information
- Station code: 1206

History
- Opened: 29 June 2025 (13 months ago)
- Former names: Nanhang Xincun (南航新村)

Services
Preceding station	Guangzhou Metro	Following station
Guangzhou Baiyun Railway Station towards Xunfenggang	Line 12 West section	Xinshixu towards Guangzhou Gymnasium
Location

Tangchong station (Chinese: 棠涌站; pinyin: Tángchōng Zhàn; Cantonese Yale: Tòhngchūng Jaahm) is a station on Line 12 of the Guangzhou Metro. It is located underground on Tanchong Road between Jiayuan Street and Dapu South 1st Road in Guangzhou's Baiyun District. It opened on 29 June 2025.

== Station layout ==
This station is a three-storey underground station. The ground level is the exit, and it is surrounded by Tanchong Road, Dapu South 1st Road, Tangchong Village and other nearby buildings. The first floor is the concourse, the second floor is the station equipment level, and the third floor is the platform for Line 12.

G	-	Exits A, B, C, D
L1; Concourse	Lobby	Ticket Machines, Customer Service, Shops, Police Station, Security Facilities
L2	Mezzanine	Station Equipment
L2; Platforms	Platform 2	12 towards Xunfenggang (Guangzhou Baiyun Railway Station)
L2; Platforms	Island platform, doors will open on the left (Toilets, Nursery)
L2; Platforms	Platform 1	12 towards Guangzhou Gymnasium (Xinshixu)

=== Concourse ===
There are automatic ticket machines and an AI customer service center at the concourse. There is also a bakery and pastry shop and various self-service facilities. In addition, there is an automated external defibrillator next to the station control center. There are elevators, escalators, and stairs in the fare-paid area for passengers to reach the platform.

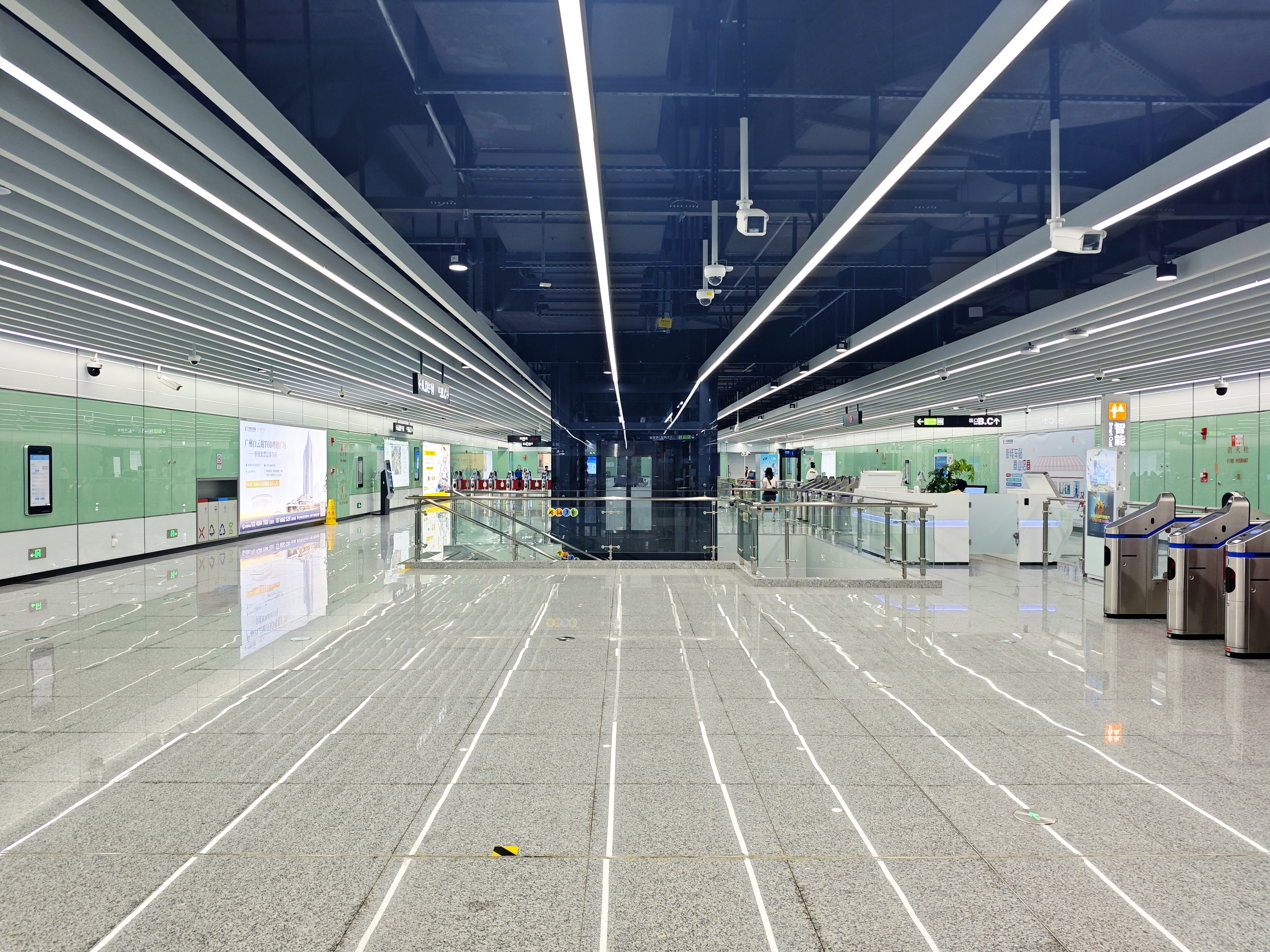
Concourse

=== Platform ===
The station has island platform located under Tanchong Road.

In addition, toilets and a nursery room are located at the end of the platform towards Xinshixu station.

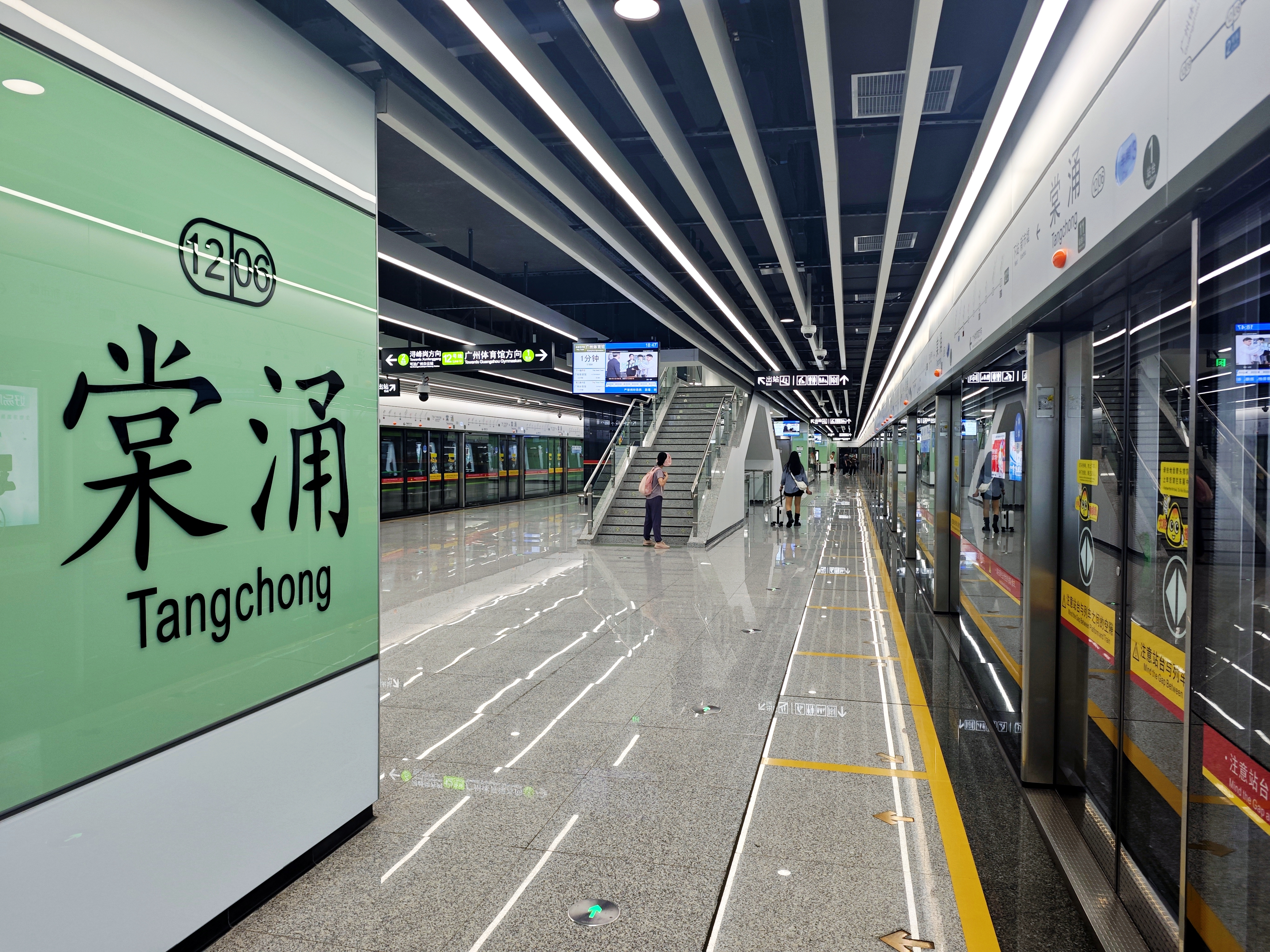
Platform 1 (towards Higher Education Mega Center South)

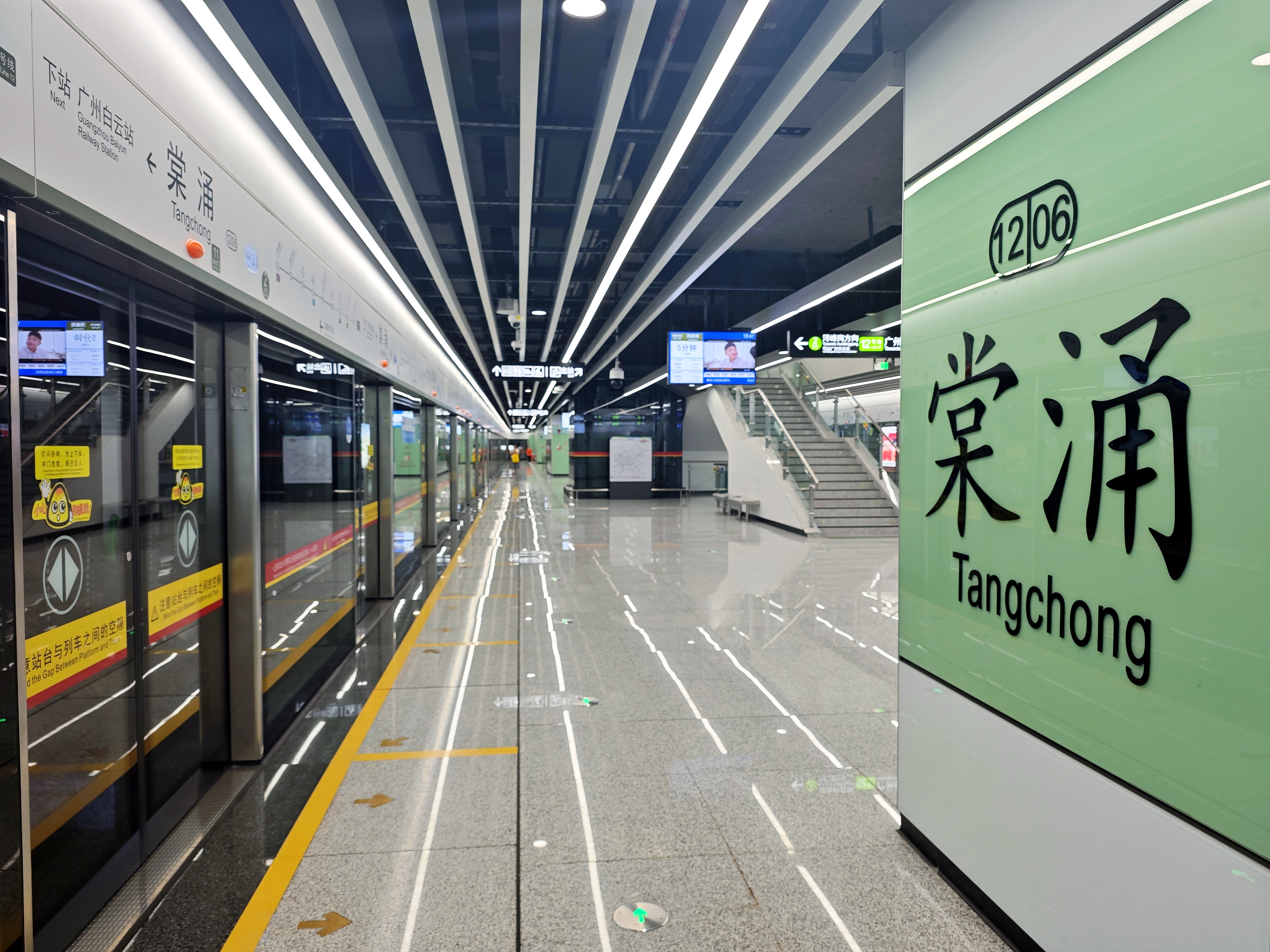
Platform 2 (towards Xunfenggang)

=== Entrances/exits ===
The station has 4 points of entry/exit. Exit A is equipped with an elevator.

- A: Tanchong Road
- B: Dapu South 1st Street
- C: Dapu South 1st Street
- D: Tanchong Road
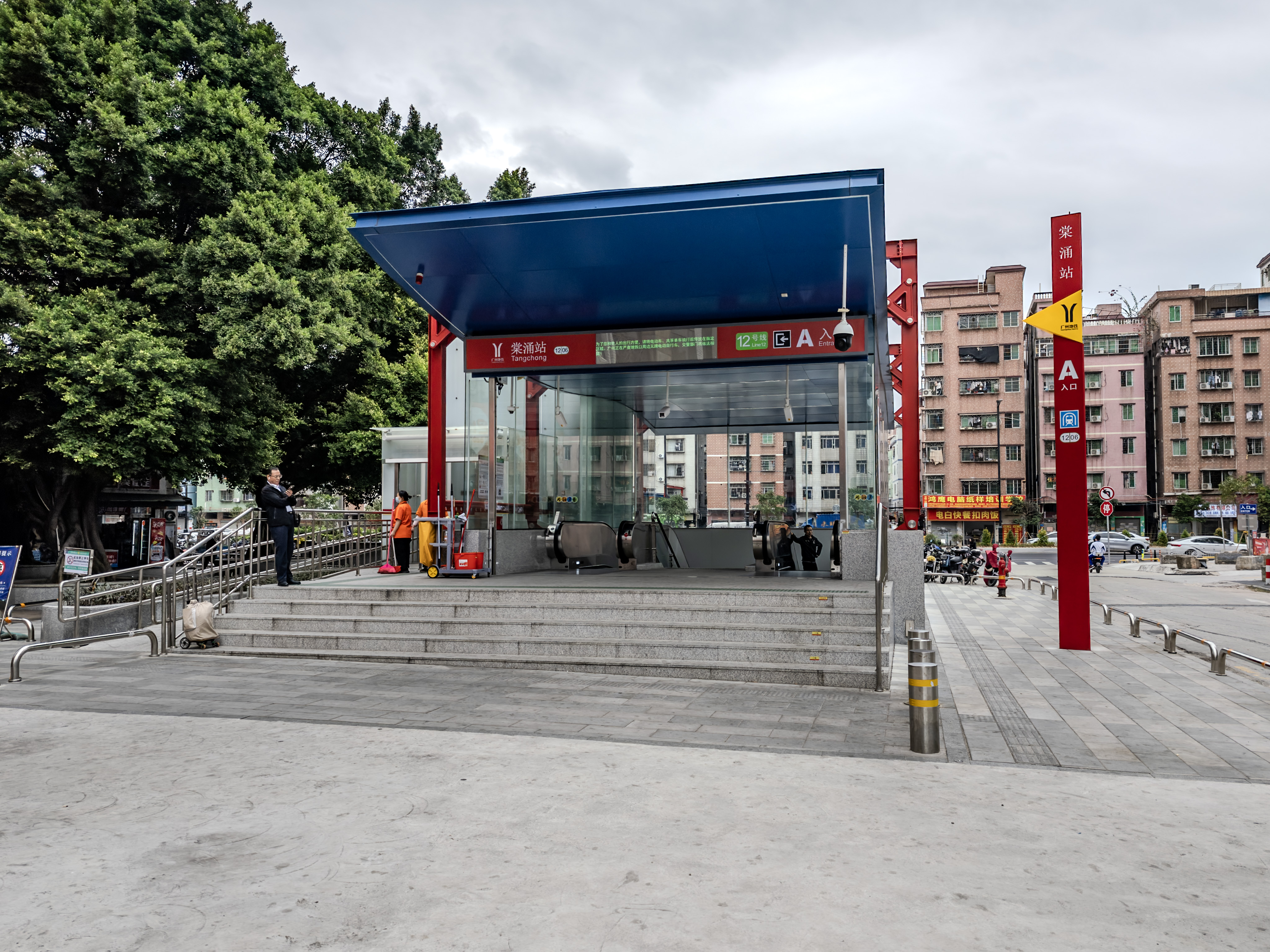
Entrance A

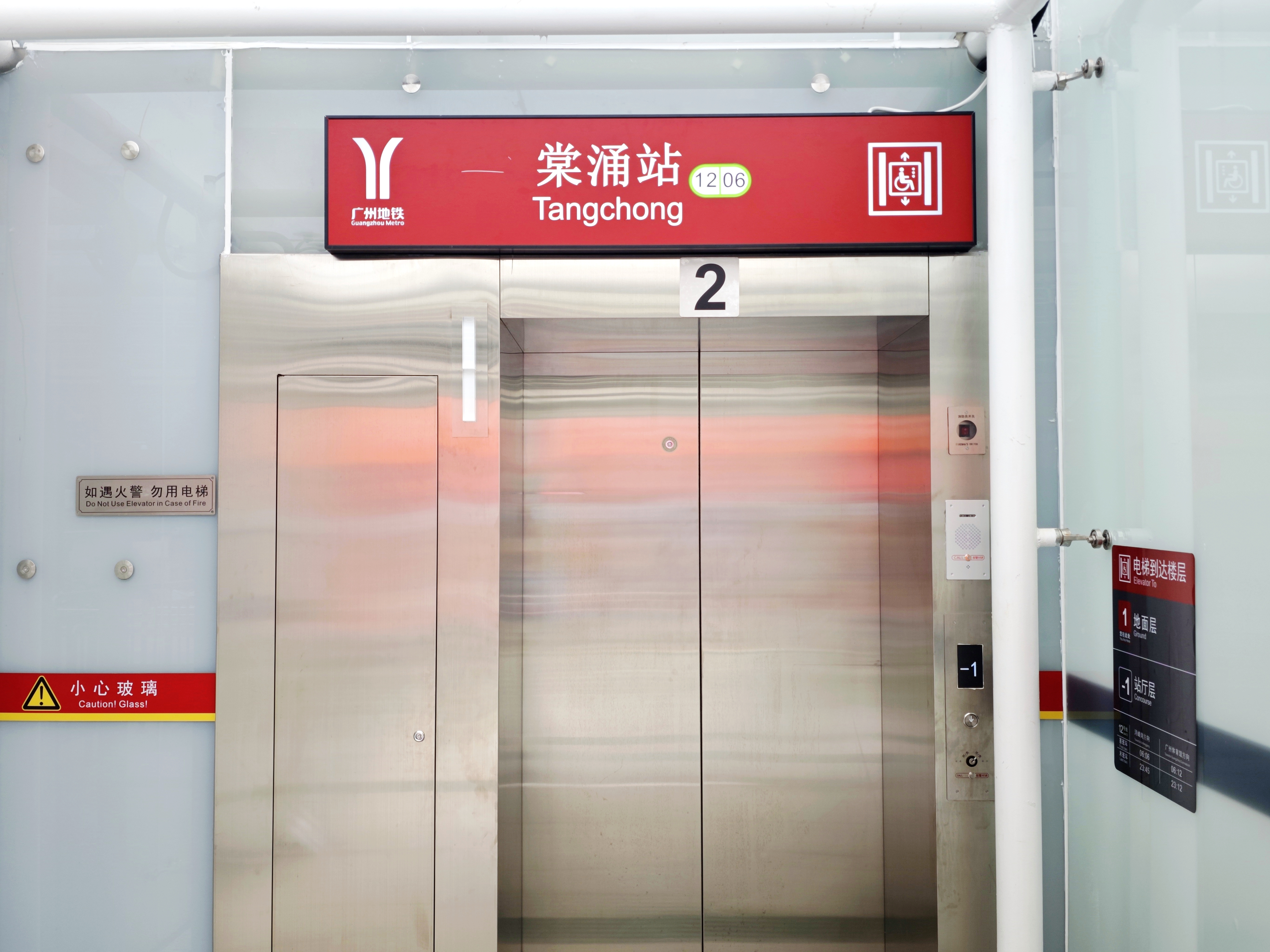
Elevator of Entrance A

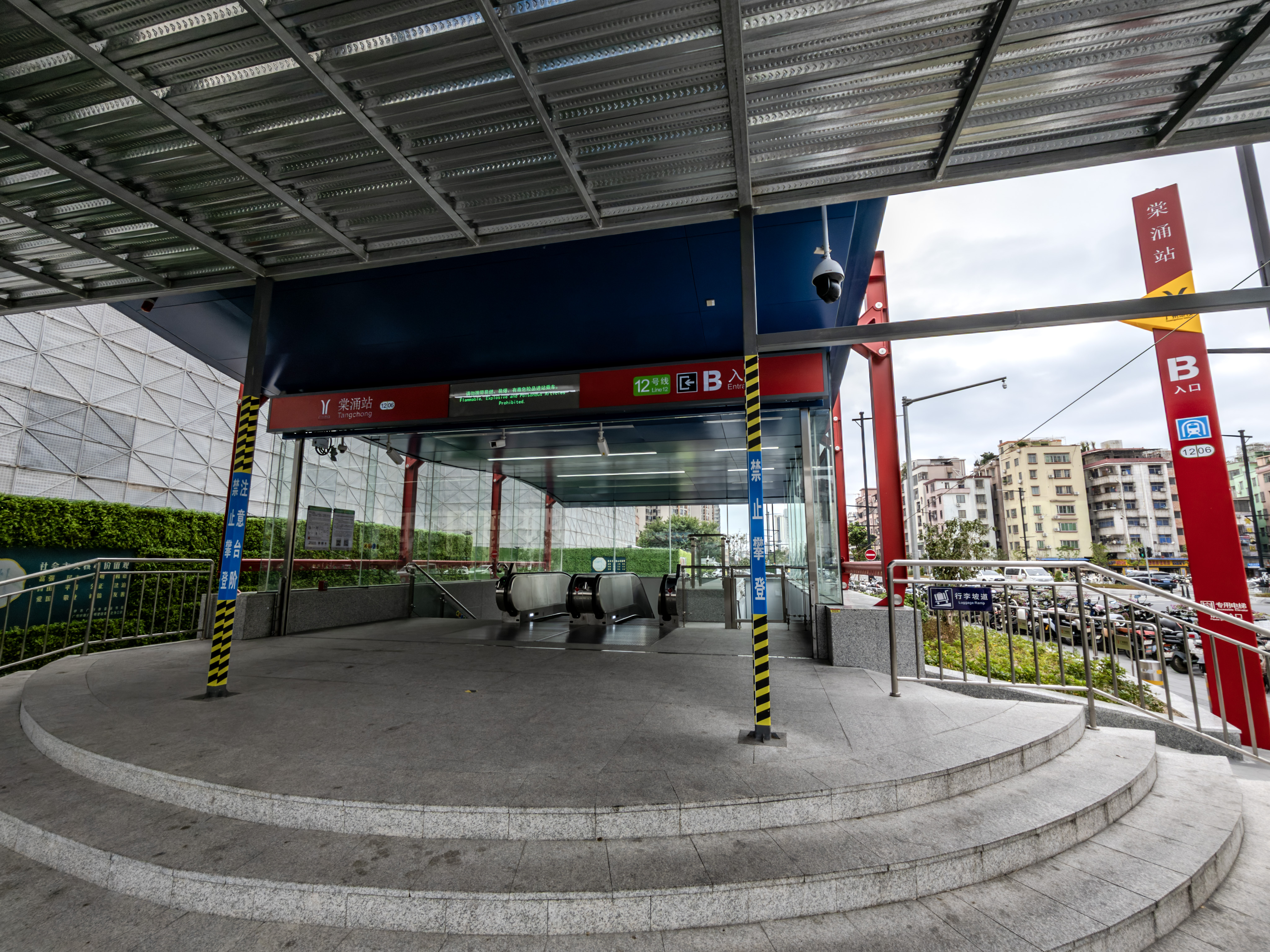
Entrance B

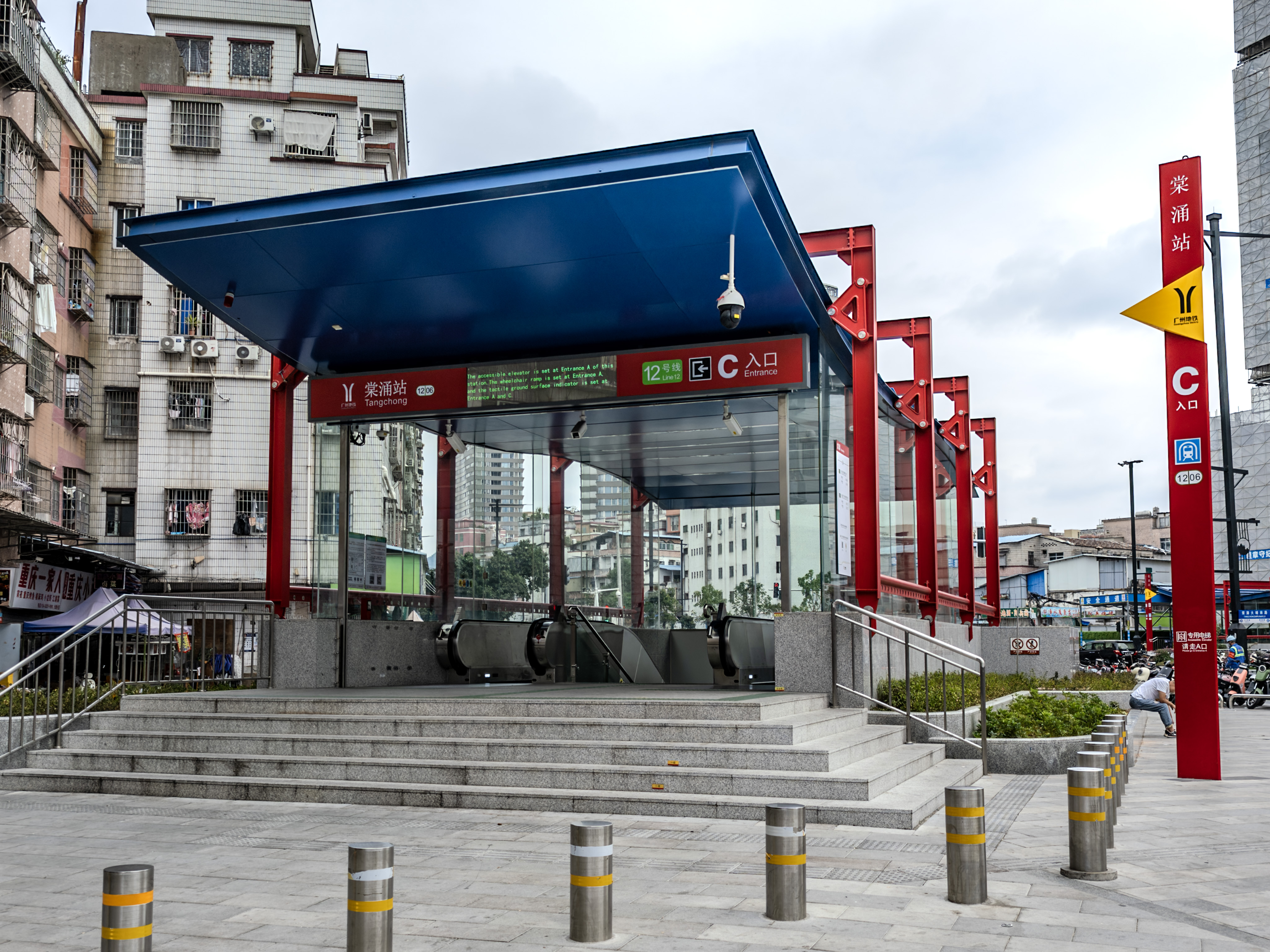
Entrance C

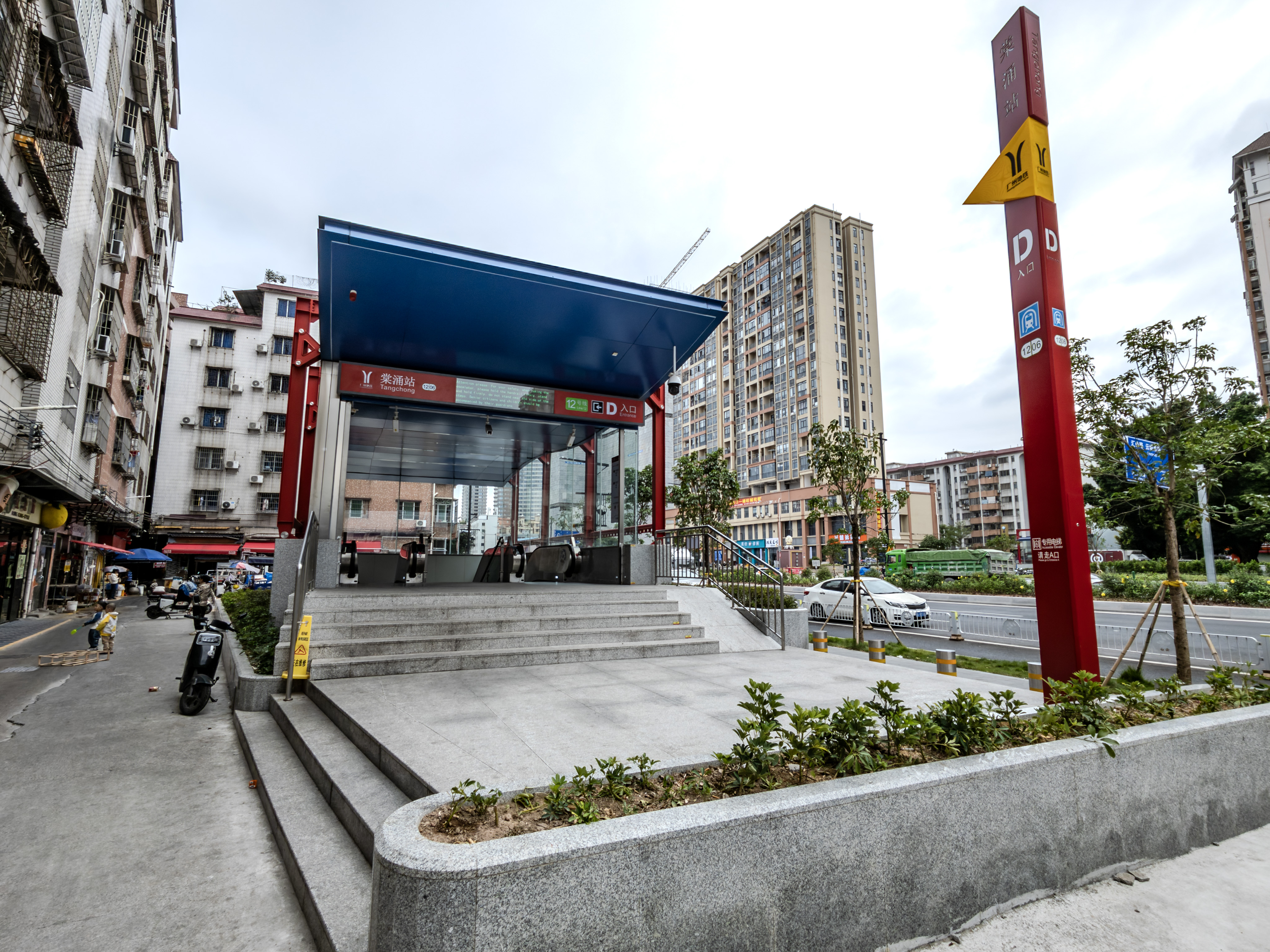
Entrance D

== History ==
The station was not included in the original plan for Line 12. In response to the planning needs of Tangxi Station of the National Railway (now Guangzhou Baiyun railway station), the western section of Line 12 was moved to the north, and the construction of Nanhang Xincun station was added. Since the name of the station project includes the name of the enterprise (which is not allowed), the authorities renamed it Tangchong station in 2025 according to the Tangchong Economic Cooperative where the station is located.

On 27 March 2025, the station completed the "three rights" transfer. On 29 June 2025, the station was opened.
