= Guangzhou Baiyun Railway Station (Guangzhou Metro) =

Guangzhou Metro interchange station

Guangzhou Baiyun Railway Station 广州白云站
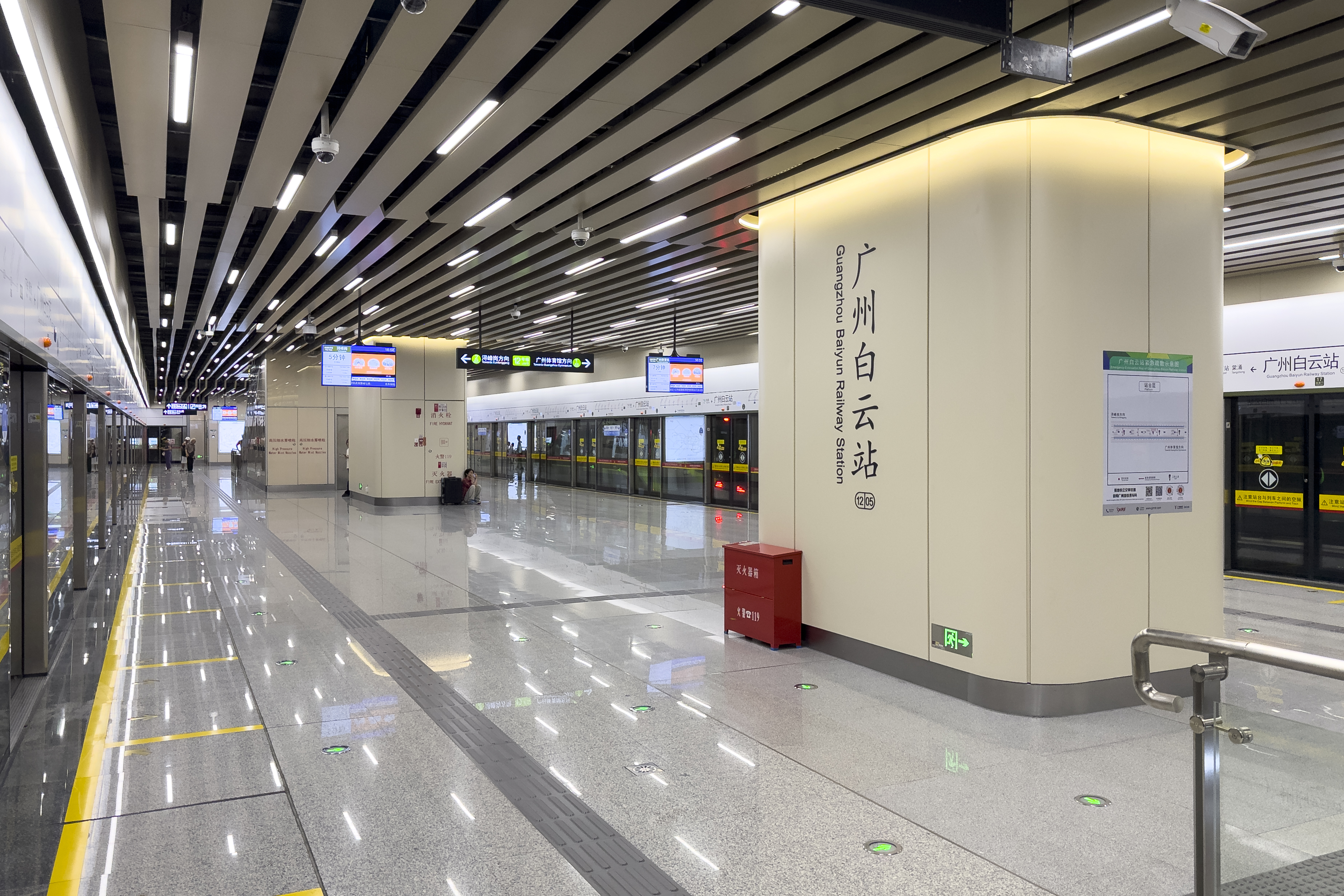
- Platform

Chinese name
- Simplified Chinese: 广州白云站
- Traditional Chinese: 廣州白雲站
Transcriptions
Standard Mandarin
- Hanyu Pinyin: Guǎngzhōu Báiyún Zhàn
Yue: Cantonese
- Yale Romanization: Gwóngjāu Baahk'wàhn Jaahm
- Jyutping: Gwong^{2}zau^{1} Baak^{6}wan^{4} Zaam^{6}

General information
- Location: Underneath Guangzhou Baiyun railway station Xinshi Subdistrict, Tangjing Subdistrict and Shijing Subdistrict, Baiyun District, Guangzhou, Guangdong; China
- Coordinates: 23°11′33.61″N 113°14′27.71″E
- Operator: Guangzhou Metro Co. Ltd.
- Lines: Line 12; Line 22 (U/C); Line 24 (U/C)
- Platforms: 6 (3 island platforms)
- Tracks: 2
- Connections: Guangzhou Baiyun railway station

Construction
- Structure type: Underground
- Accessible: Yes
- Architectural style: Guangzhou Metro Design & Research Institute Co., Ltd.

Other information
- Station code: 1205

History
- Opened: Line 12: 29 June 2025 (14 months ago)

Services
Preceding station	Guangzhou Metro	Following station
Julong towards Xunfenggang	Line 12 West section	Tangchong towards Guangzhou Gymnasium
Future services
Xiamao towards Airport North (Terminal 2)	Line 22	Caihong Bridge towards Panyu Square
Huangshi towards Guangzhou North Railway Station	Line 24	Tangjing towards Jiangfu
Location

Guangzhou Baiyun Railway Station metro station (Chinese: 广州白云站; pinyin: Guǎngzhōu Báiyún Zhàn; Cantonese Yale: Gwóngjāu Baahk'wàhn Jaahm) is a station on Line 12 of the Guangzhou Metro, which connects to Guangzhou Baiyun railway station of the national railway. The station opened on 29 June 2025 with the opening of the western section of Line 12.

== Station structure ==
With a total construction area of about 180,000 square meters, the station is divided into three sections, the north-south Lines 12 and 24 under the railway station east square, the north-south Line 22 under the railway station west square, and a reserved section for Foshan Metro Line 6 and another new line underneath the railway station structure. All three sections, when put together, resemble an "H" shape. When the metro station opened, nearly half the station was opened.

This station is a cultural themed station on Line 12, and the overall design integrates the triple themes of the geological stratigraphy of Baiyun Mountain, the hydrological vein of the Pearl River, and the traffic flow of the national railway station above.

In addition, toilets and a nursery room are located in the unpaid area of the concourse near Exit A, and at the east end of the Line 12 platform.

=== Platform layout ===
At present, Guangzhou Baiyun Railway station metro station is a three-storey underground station, of which the second floor is the concourse, the third floor is the equipment level, and the fourth floor are the platforms for Line 12. Above the metro station is the east square and departure concourse of the national railway station.

G	-	Guangzhou Baiyun Railway Station East Square
L1	-	Guangzhou Baiyun Railway Station Arrival Concourse
L2; Concourse	Lobby	Ticket Machines, Customer Service, Shops, Toilets, Nursery Room, Police Station, Security Facilities
L3	Mezzanine	Towards concourse and platforms Station Equipment
M	Mezzanine	Reserved transfer level
L4; Platforms		24 reserved track
L4; Platforms	Island platform, not in use
L4; Platforms	Platform 2	12 towards Xunfenggang (Julong)
L4; Platforms	Island platform, doors will open on the left (Toilets, Nursery)
L4; Platforms	Platform 1	12 towards Guangzhou Gymnasium (Tangchong)
L4; Platforms	Island platform, not in use
L4; Platforms		24 reserved track

=== Concourse ===
The concourse of the station, located on the second underground floor, is equipped with electronic ticket vending machines and AI customer service centers. There are also candy and snack bars and various self-service facilities. There is an automated external defibrillator next to the station control center.

In addition, the east square of the railway station between Line 12 and a future new line on the second underground floor adopts a sunken open-air design, which is the first station of the Guangzhou Metro to bring natural light and garden landscape into the underground metro station space.

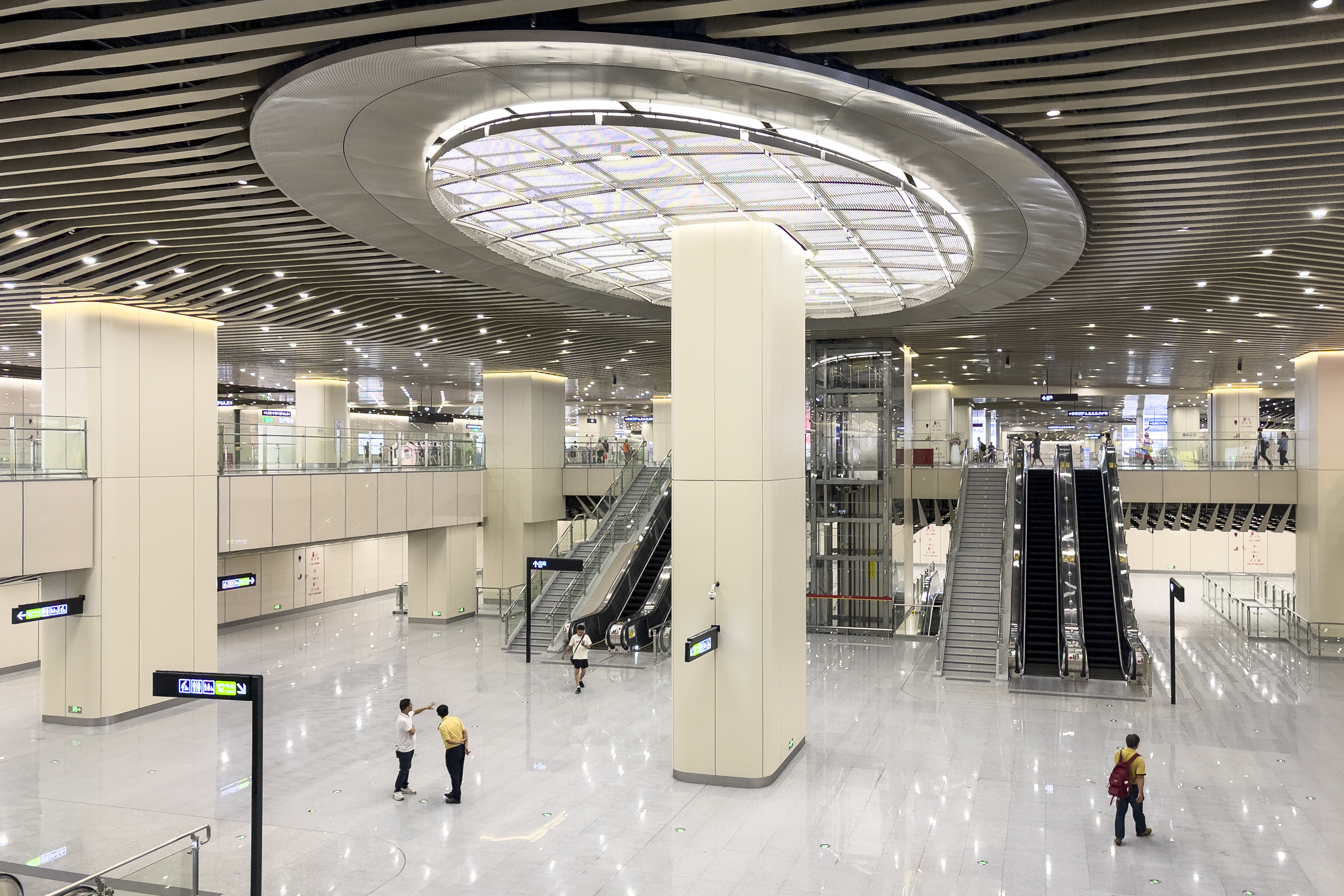
Attrium on the east side of the equipment level

=== Platforms ===
The currently open Line 12/24 section has three side-by-side island platforms, with Line 24 on the outermost sides and Line 12 on the inside. The island platform in the middle was opened first, and the island platforms on both sides will not be opened until Line 24 is opened.

There is a set of double storage lines at the south end of the Line 12 platform, and there is a connecting line to Line 24 near the up and down lines.

=== Entrances/exits ===
The station has 11 points of entry/exit. Among them, Exits F, G, H and J, located in the arrival concourse on the first underground floor of the national railway station is entry only (into the metro station), and one-way security check measures are implemented so that passengers can take the metro without having to go through security again after exiting the national railway station. Exits D and K are equipped with elevators.

- A: Tangxin Road
- B1: Guangzhou Baiyun railway station, Guangzhou Baiyun Railway Station East Square
- B2: Guangzhou Baiyun Railway Station, Guangzhou Baiyun Railway Station East Square
- C: Tangxin Road
- D: Guangzhou Baiyun Railway Station, Guangzhou Baiyun Railway Station East Square, Guangzhou Baiyun Railway Station Taxi Parking, Guangzhou Baiyun Railway Station Bus Terminus
- E: Guangzhou-Qingyuan intercity railway, Guangzhou Baiyun Railway Station (Exit only)
- F, G, H, J: (Entry only from the national railway station or intercity railway without security check)
- K: Guangzhou Baiyun Railway Station, Baiyun Coach Terminal, Guangzhou Baiyun Railway Station East Square
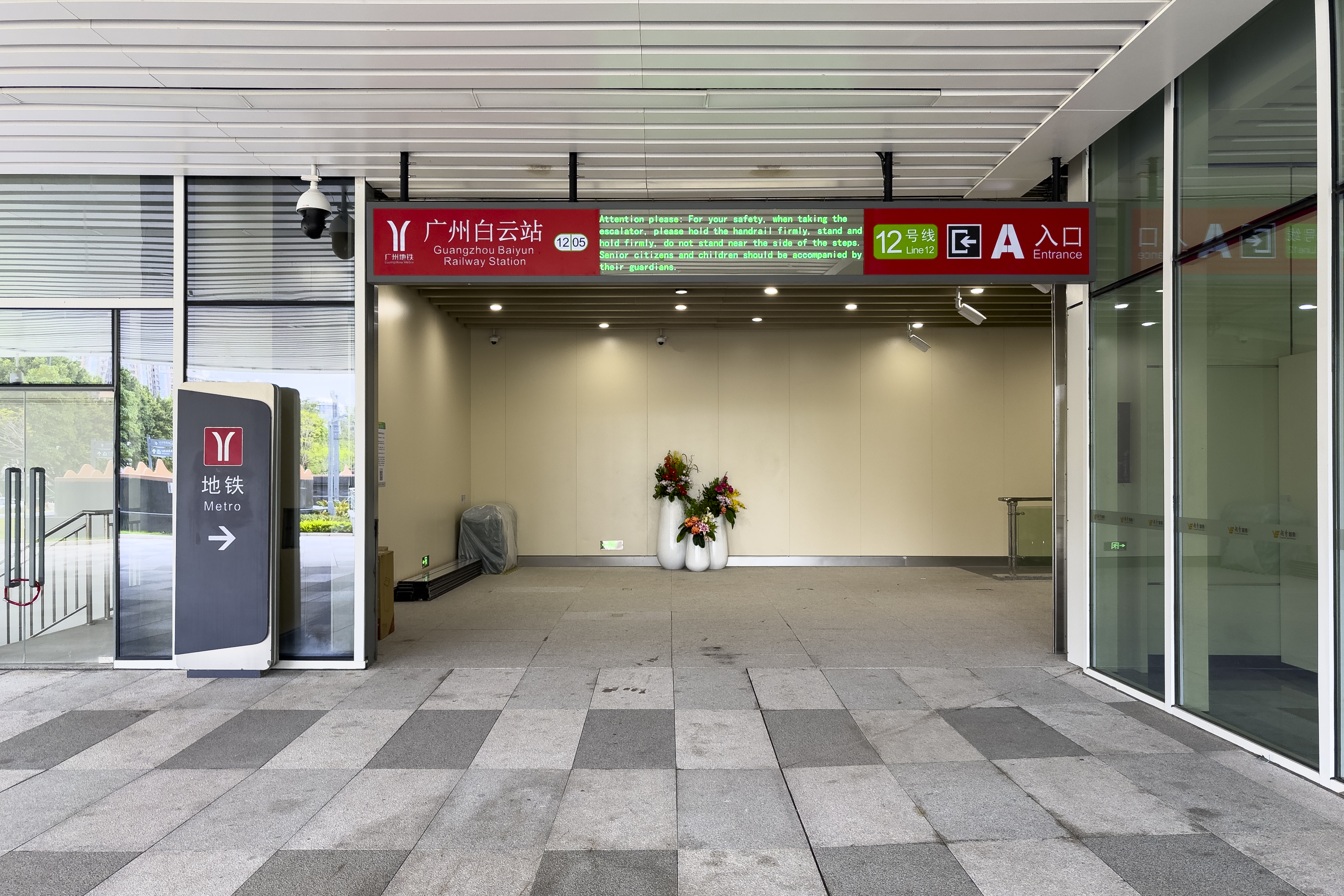
Entrance A

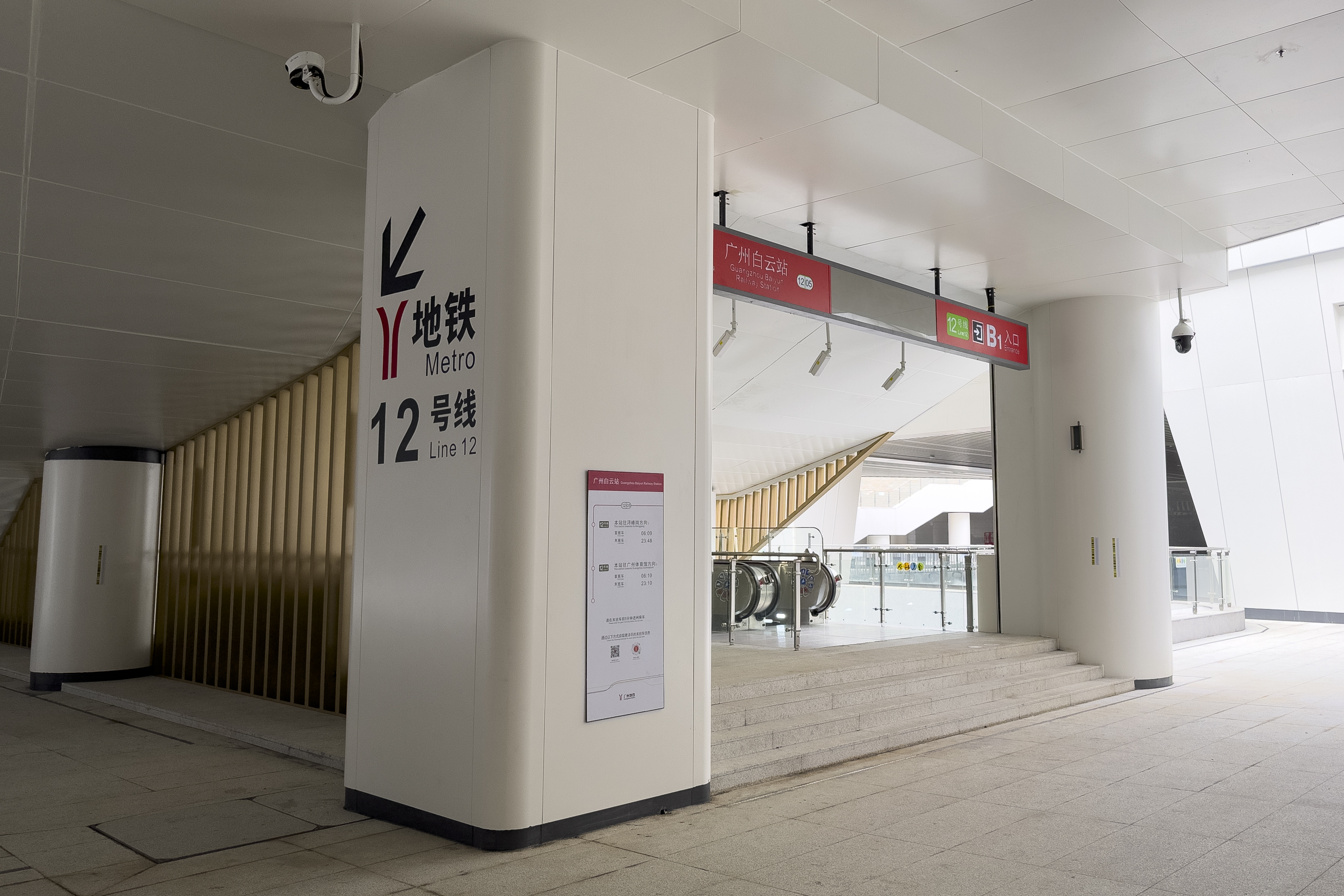
Entrance B1

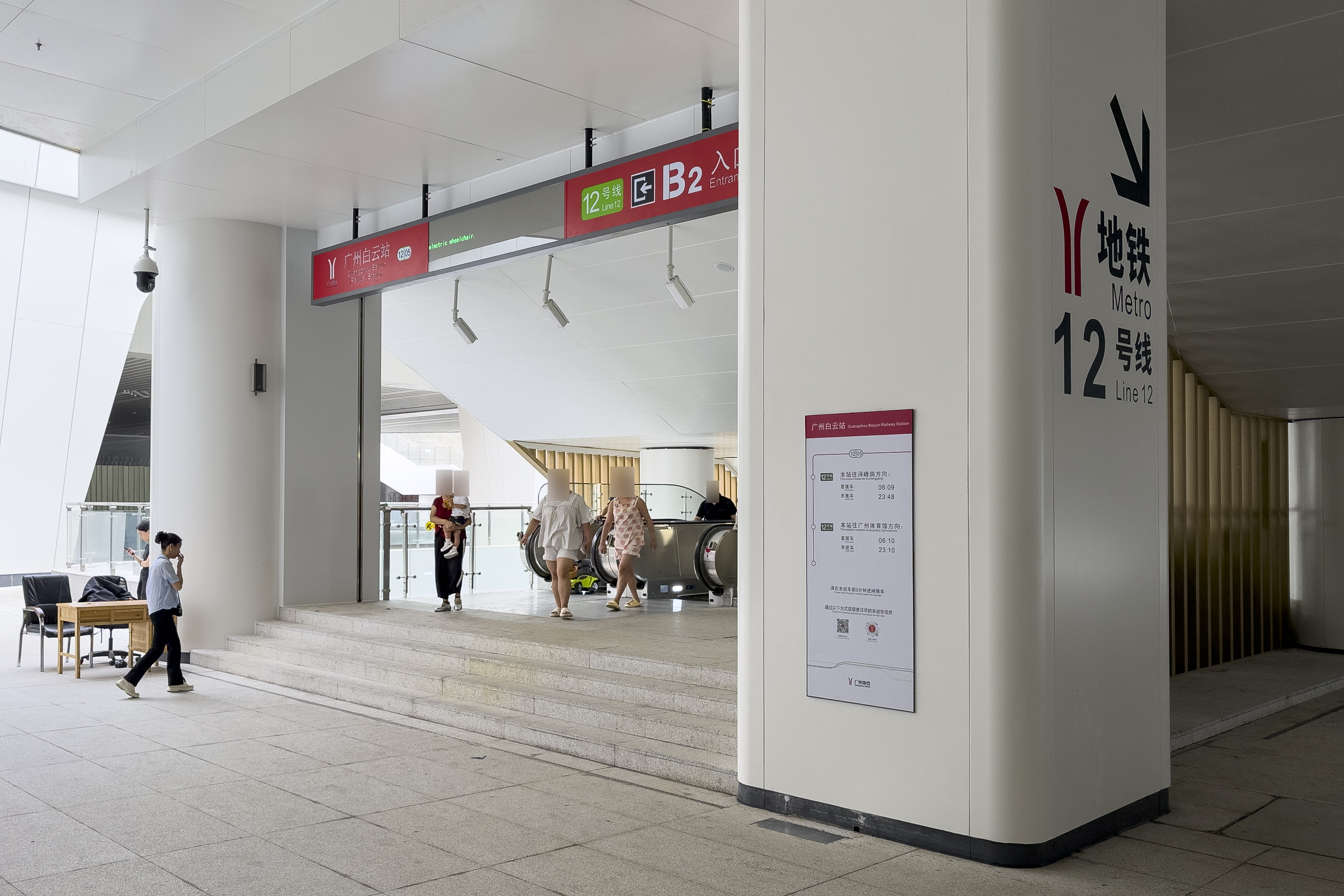
Entrance B2

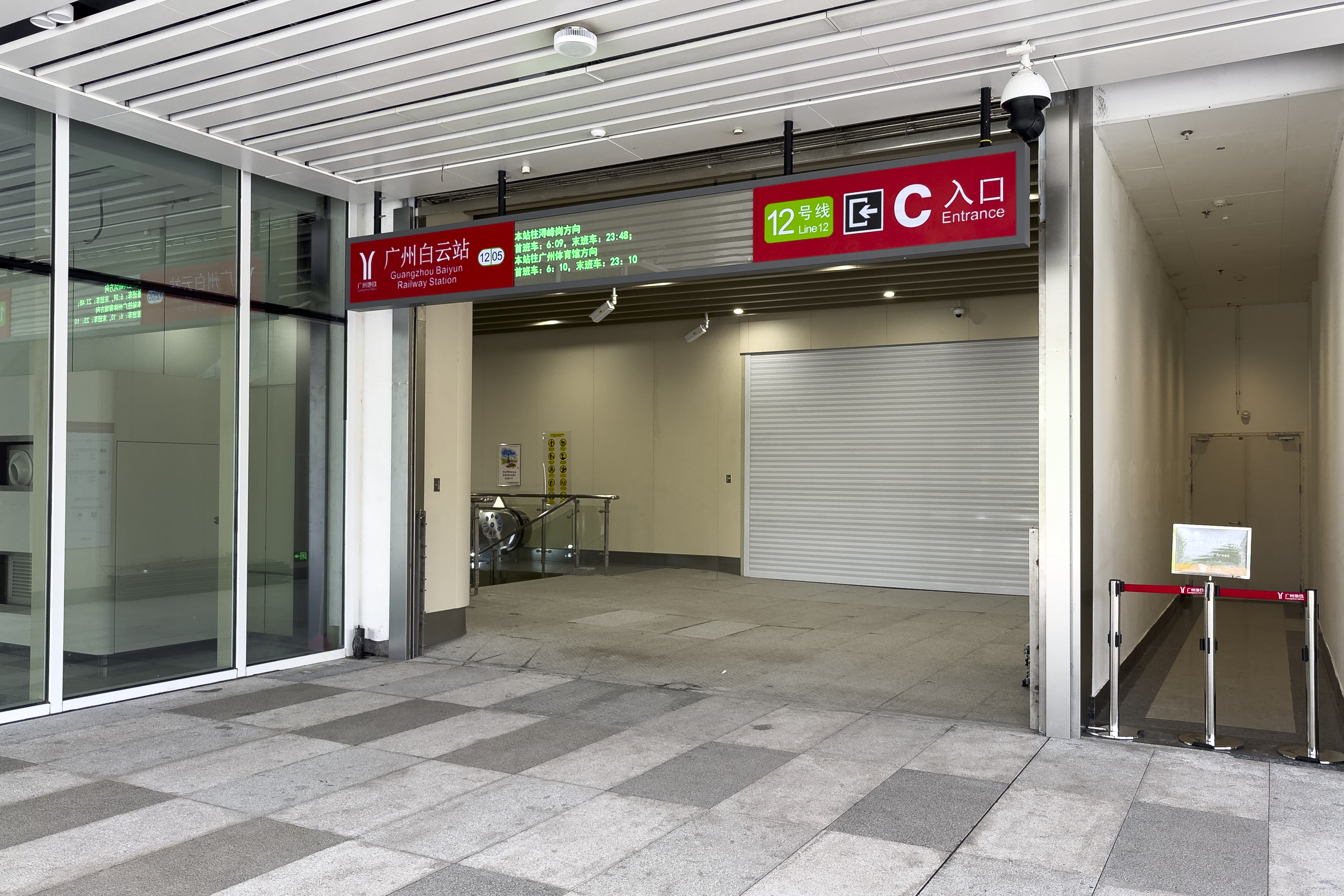
Entrance C

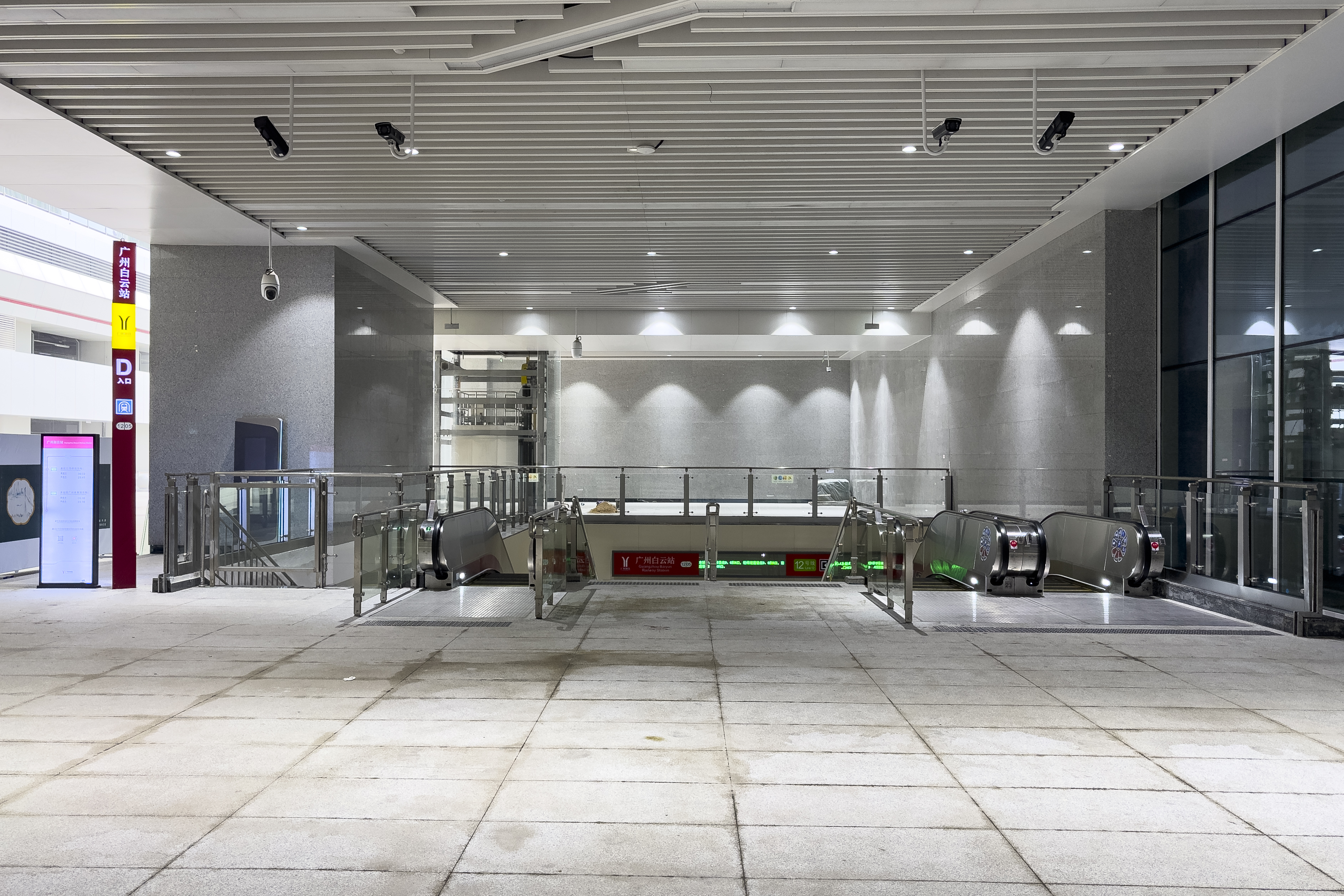
Entrance D

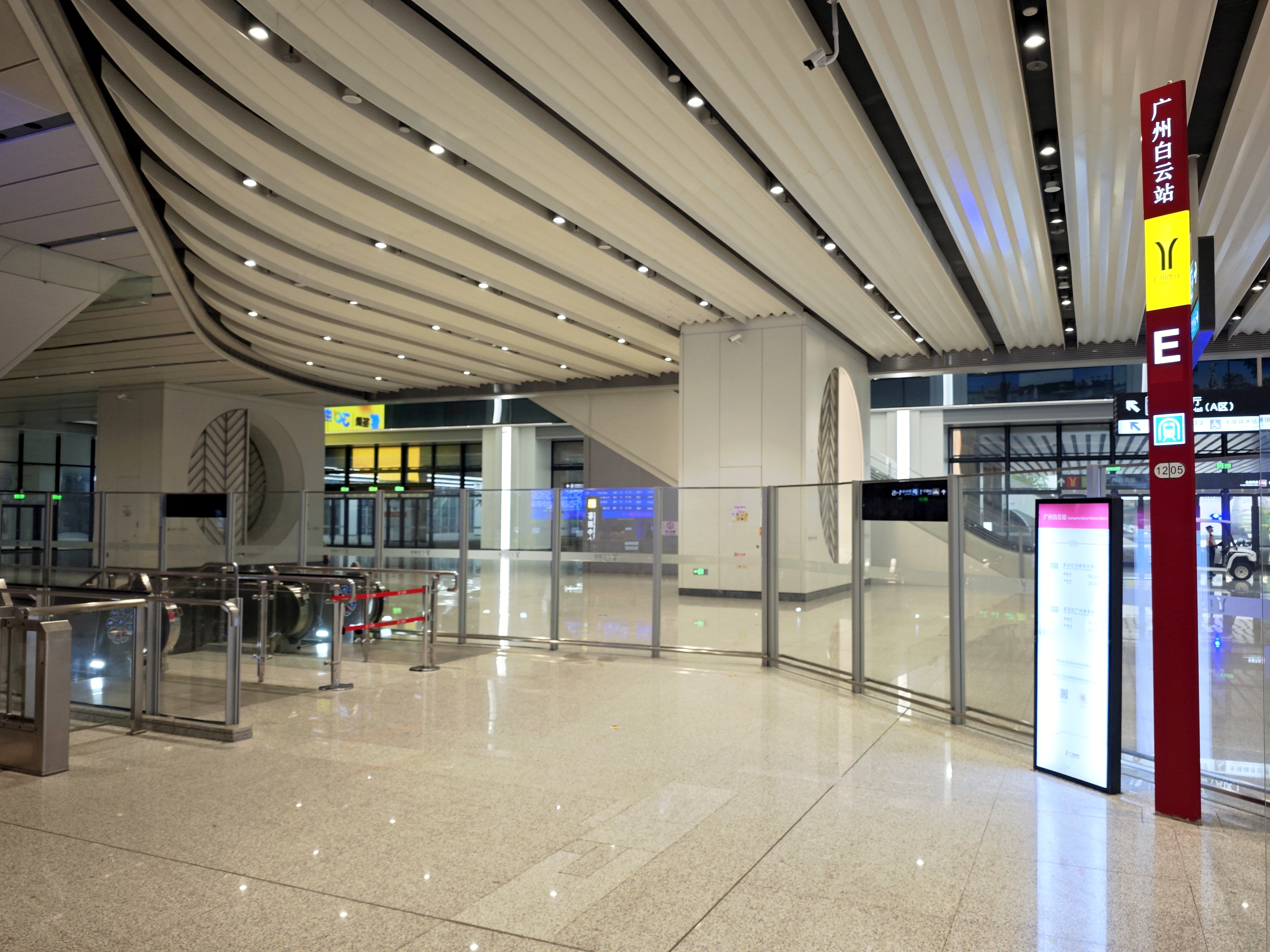
Exit E (exiting only)

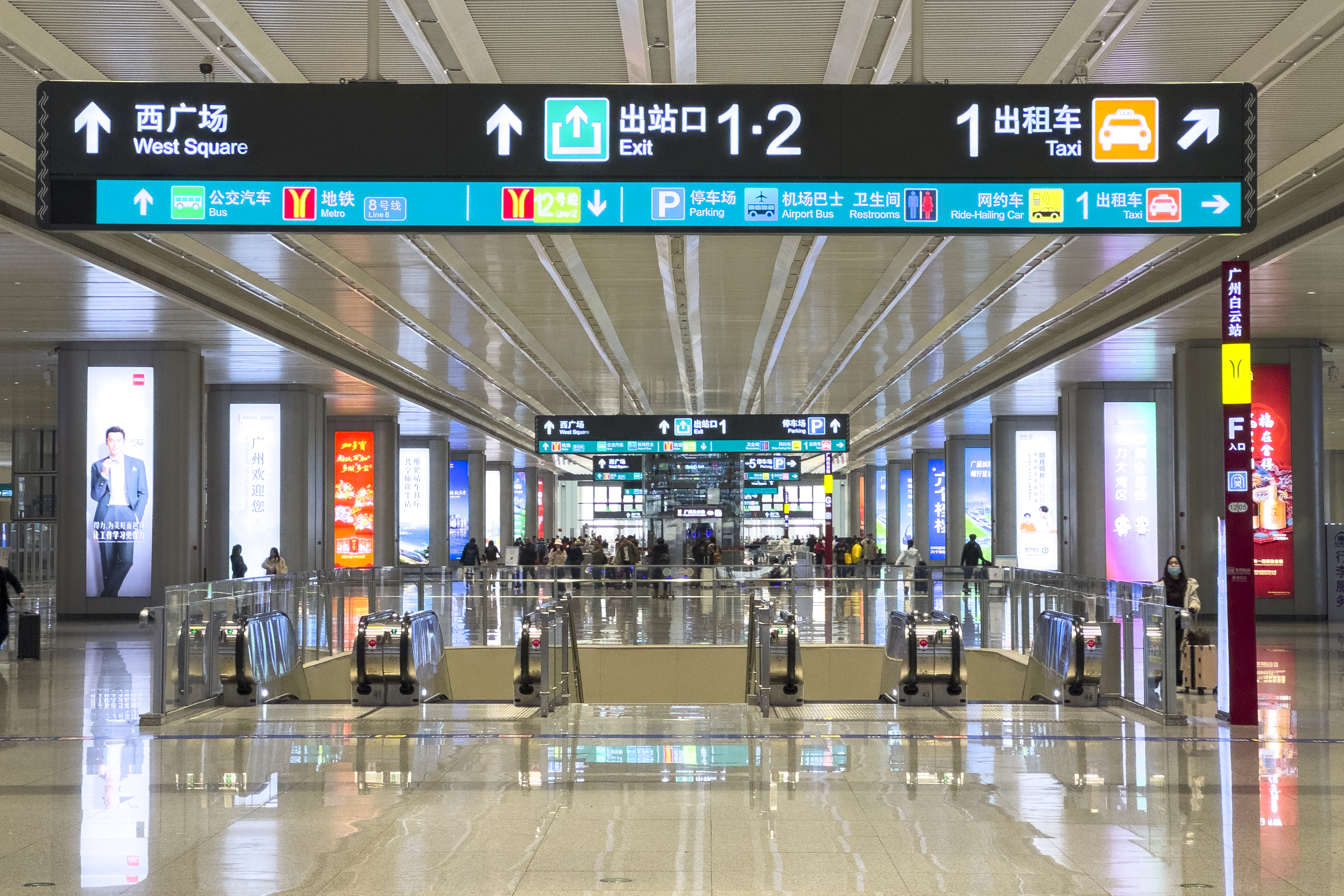
Entrance F (entering only)

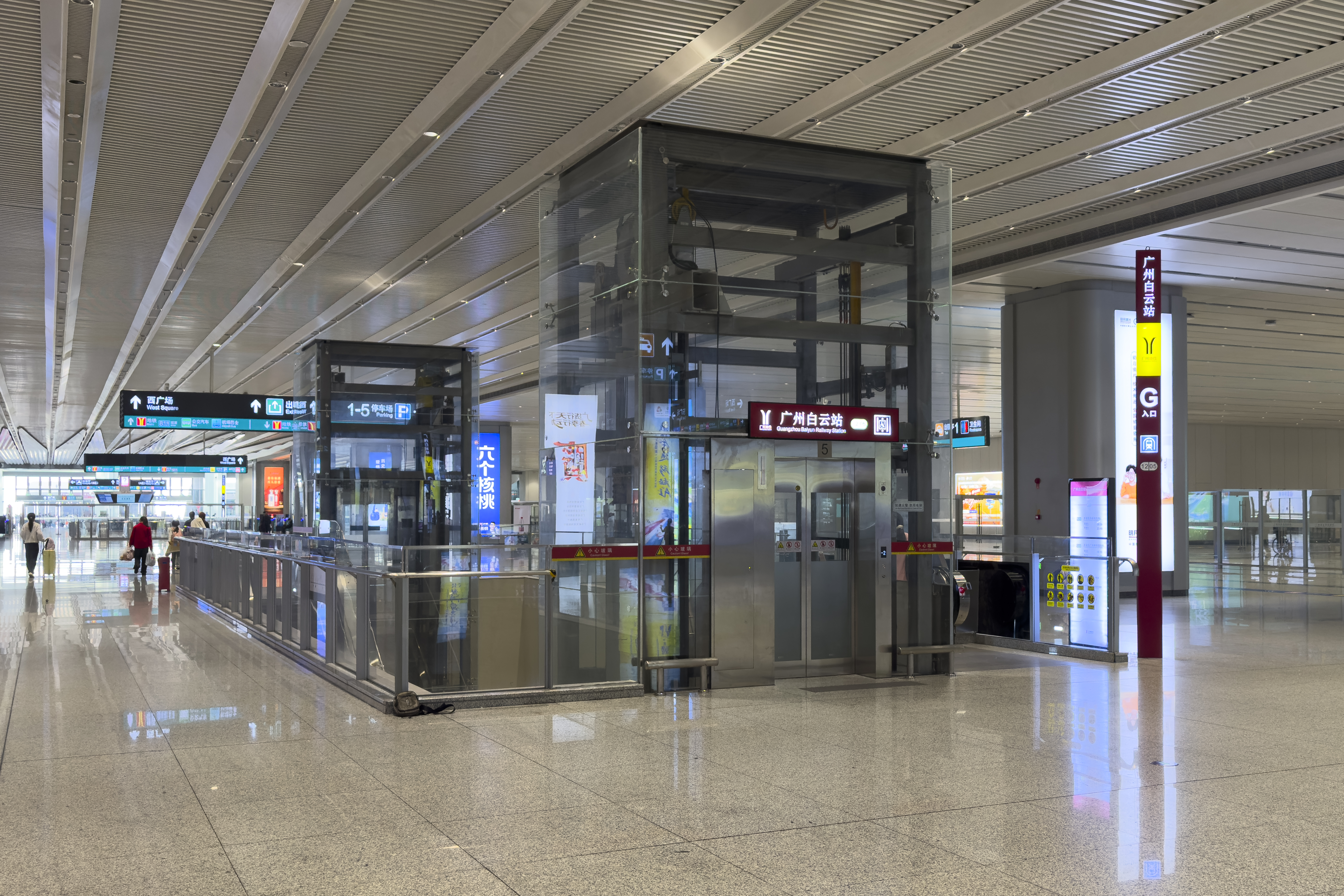
Entrance G (entering only)

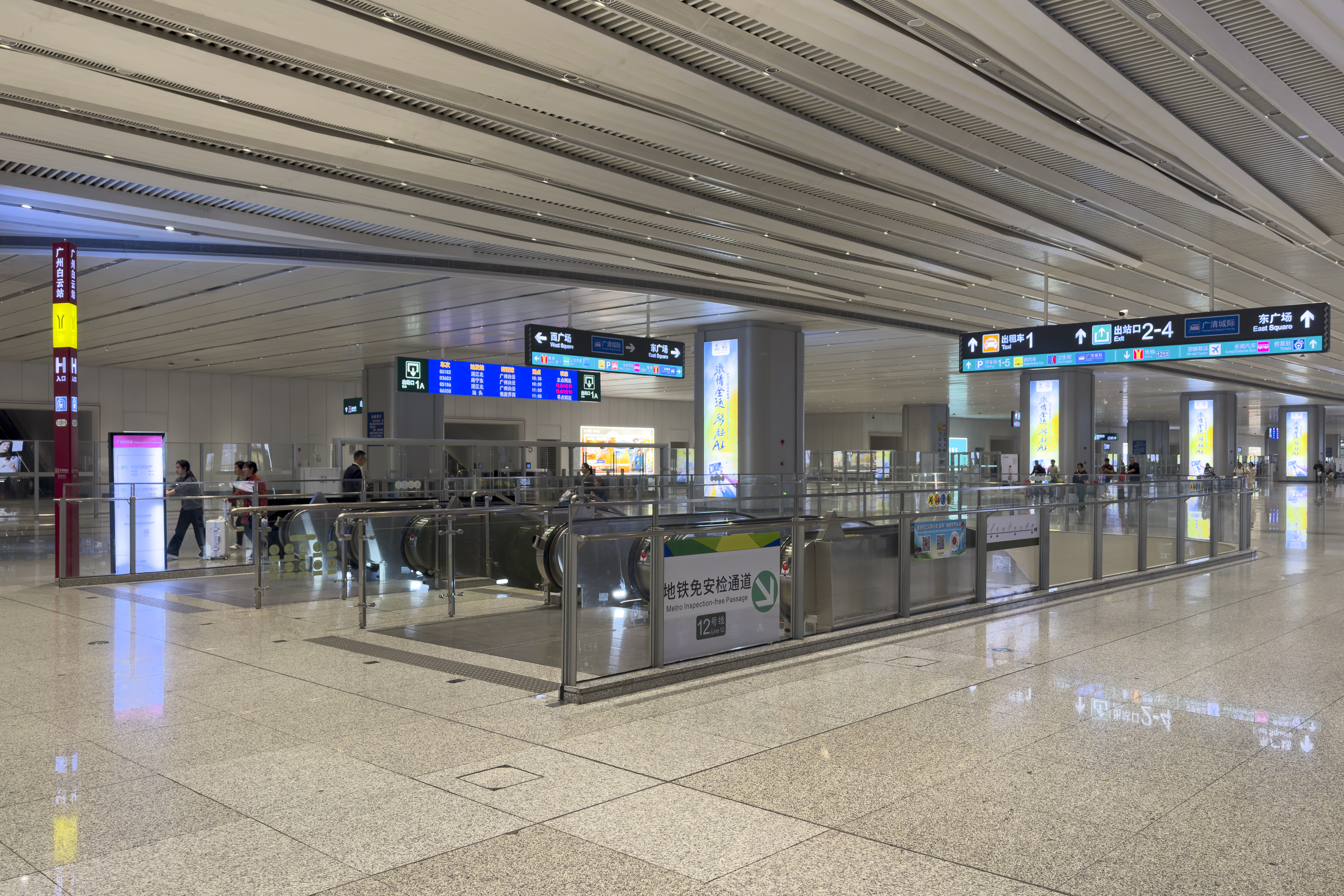
Entrance H (entering only)

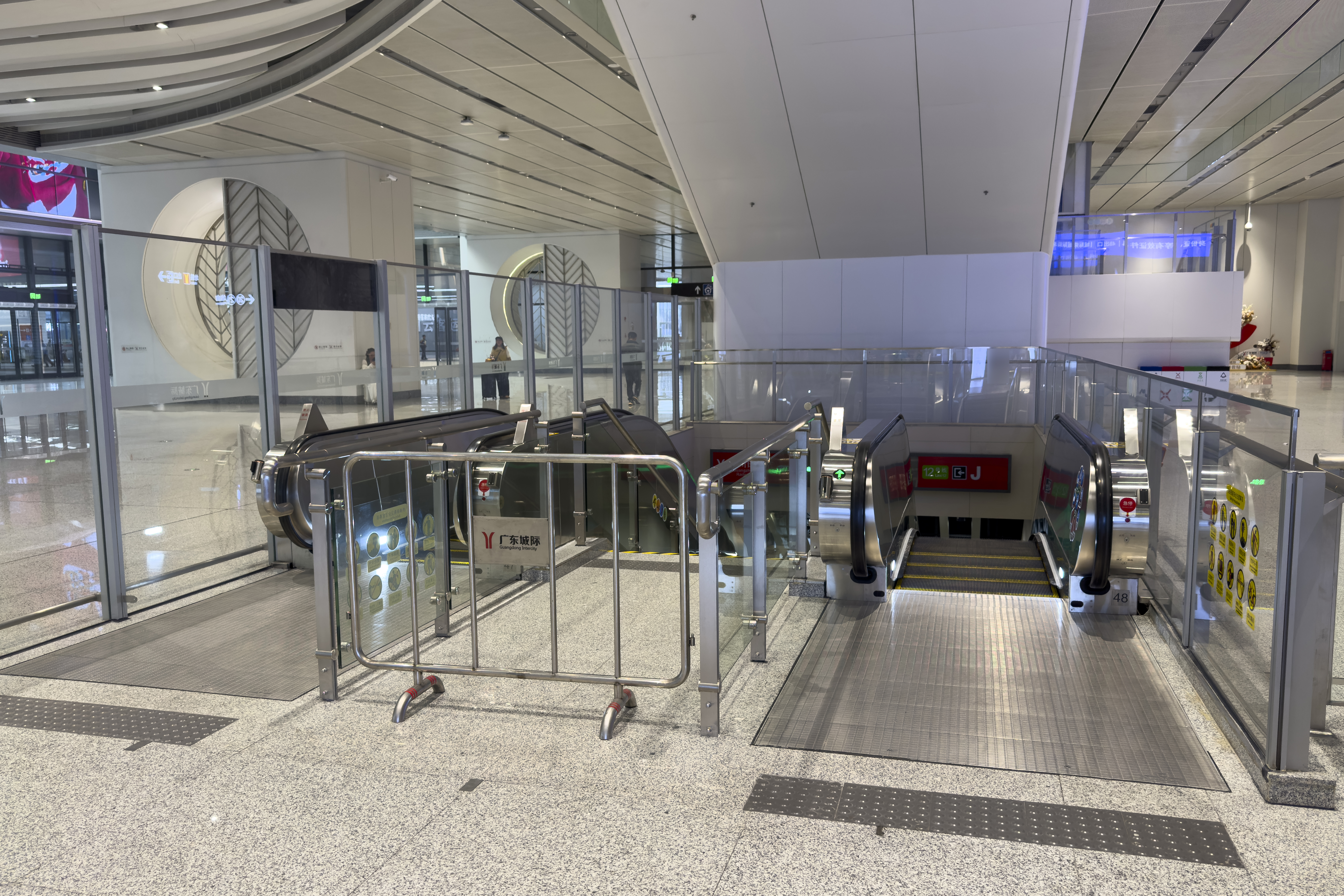
Entrance J (entering only)

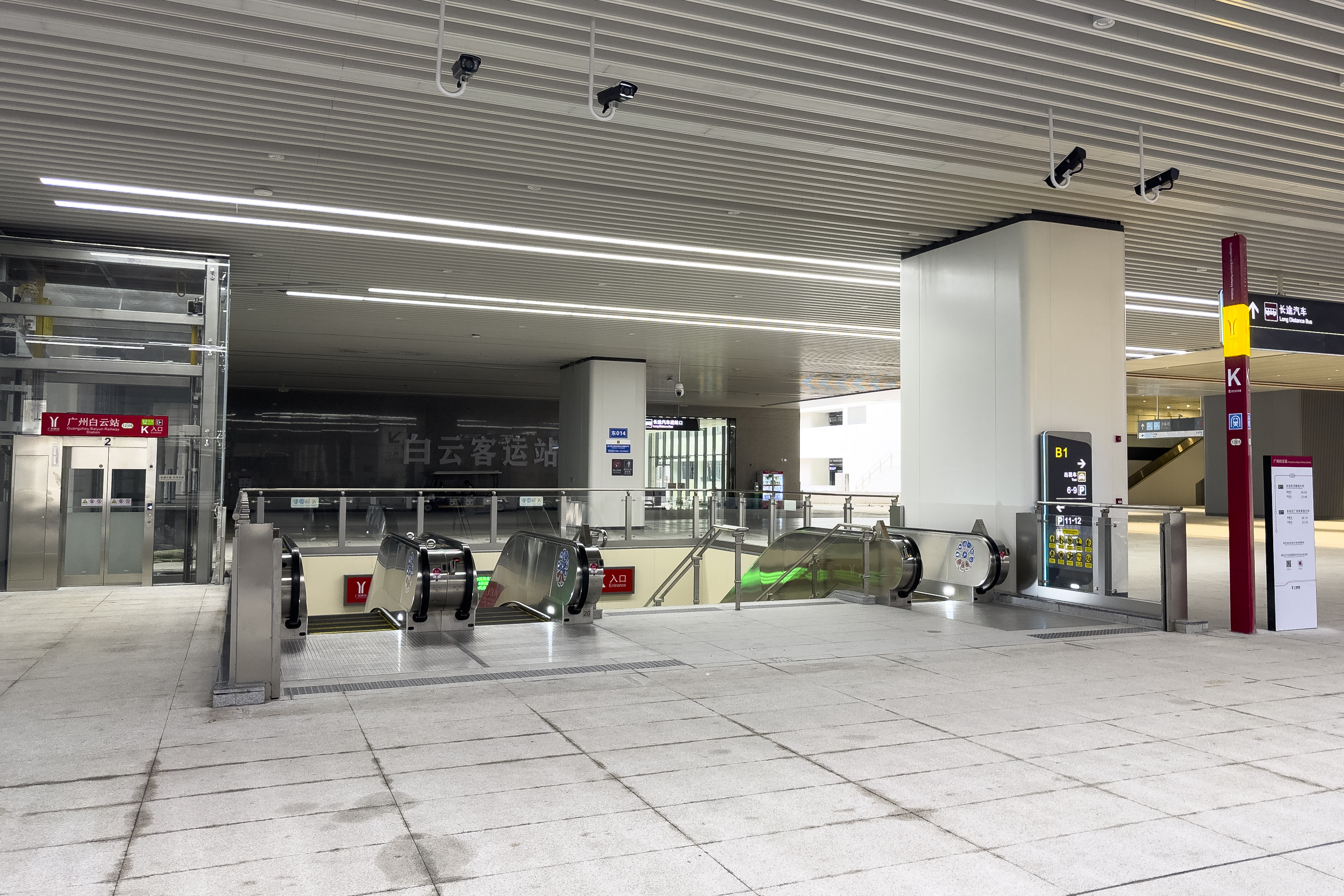
Entrance K

== History ==
Among the lines currently intersecting with Guangzhou Baiyun railway station, Line 12, which was originally planned, did not pass through this station at first. Afterward, when planning the renovation of the old Tangxi station into Guangzhou Baiyun Railway Station, Shitan station of Line 8 was too far away, and the station location could not be altered since construction of the line had already started, so the route of Line 12 was altered to include Tangxi station to meet the needs of intersecting with the national railway station. The northern extension of Line 22 and Line 24 formed by the dismantling of the northern extension of Line 8 also set up Tangxi (Baiyun) station and Baiyun station accordingly. At the same time, Foshan Metro Line 8, which was planned to serve the northern part of Nanhai in Foshan, extended into Guangzhou and linked up with this station, but the Guangzhou section of the line was transferred to Foshan Metro Line 6 after the updated metro network planning in Foshan. In addition, the authorities also planned an east-west line to connect Huadu and Baiyun and fill the rail gap on the west side of Line 8, which was not included in the Guangzhou Metro network plan but was decided to also be reserved when planning the transportation facilities of Baiyun Station. In 2025, in accordance with the national railway station, the metro station will also use the name Guangzhou Baiyun Railway Station.

On 28 December 2018, station construction began in the name of the metro reservation project, dubbed the "Guangzhou Baiyun (Tangxi) Station Comprehensive Transportation Hub Integration Construction Project". Foshan Line 6 and the reserved new line were the first to be topped out on 19 June 2021, and the entire station was fully topped out on 17 November 2022.

Construction of the transfer passage connecting to Shitan station began in August 2020. In December 2023, the station completed the "three rights" transfer. The metro station structure was opened on the 26th in the same month with the opening of the national railway station.

On 30 April 2025, the Line 12/24 section of the metro station partially completed the "three rights" transfer. On 29 June the same year, this part of the station opened.

== Future development ==
The northern extension of Line 22 (Fangbai Intercity), Line 24, the planned Foshan Line 6, and another planned new line in the future will also stop at this station.

In addition to the shared platforms of Line 12 and Line 24, Line 22, Foshan Line 6 and the future new line will each have an island platform. It is worth mentioning that Foshan Line 6 and the reserved new line were originally designed on the east side, with a side-by-side layout of two island platforms and four tracks, but in order to reduce the congestion in the paid area on the east side of the concourse and improve the transfer service level of Line 22, the platform of the new line was adjusted to the west side, so that the island platforms of the two lines are staggered.

In terms of transfers, the stations of Line 12 and Line 24 adopt the design of cross-platform transfer in the forward direction, and passengers in some directions can go directly to the opposite platform to transfer. The station of Line 12/24 and the station of Foshan Line 6 form an "L" node, and the stations of Line 22 and the platform for the reserved new line form a "T" node. Other transfers will require using the concourse.

=== Future platforms ===
==== Lines 12 and 24 (when fully open) ====
G	-	Guangzhou Baiyun Railway Station East Square
L1	-	Guangzhou Baiyun Railway Station Arrival Concourse
L2; Concourse	Lobby	Ticket Machines, Customer Service, Shops, Toilets, Nursery Room, Police Station, Security Facilities
L3	Mezzanine	Station Equipment
M	Mezzanine	Towards 6
L4; Platforms		24 towards Sun Yat-sen Memorial Hall (Tangjing)
L4; Platforms	Platform 7 Platform 4	Island platform, doors will open on both sides for 12 and left for 24
L4; Platforms		12 towards Xunfenggang (Julong)
L4; Platforms	Platform 2 Platform 1	Island platform, doors will open on the left
L4; Platforms		12 towards Higher Education Mega Center South (Tangchong)
L4; Platforms	Platform 3 Platform 8	Island platform, doors will open on both sides for 12 and left for 24
L4; Platforms		24 towards Guangzhou North Railway Station (Huangshi)

==== Line 22 ====
G	-	Guangzhou Baiyun Railway Station West Square
L1	Reserved level	Reserved for future commercial development
L1	Transfer passage	Towards 8 Shitan
L2; Concourse	Lobby	Ticket Machines, Customer Service, Shops, Police Station, Security Facilities
L3	Mezzanine	Station Equipment
M	Mezzanine	Towards platform for reserved new line
L4; Platforms	Platform 6	22 towards Panyu Square (Guangzhou Railway Station)
L4; Platforms	Island platform, doors will open on the left
L4; Platforms	Platform 5	22 towards Airport North (Terminal 2) (Xiamao)

==== Foshan Line 6, future new line ====
G	-	Guangzhou Baiyun Railway Station Concourse
L1	-	Guangzhou Baiyun Railway Station Arrival Concourse
L2; Concourse	Lobby	Ticket Machines, Customer Service, Shops, Police Station, Security Facilities
L3; Platforms		Reserved track for new line
L3; Platforms	Reserved Island platform
L3; Platforms		Reserved track for new line
L3; Platforms		6 reserved track
L3; Platforms	Reserved Island platform
L3; Platforms		6 reserved track
M	Transfer level (future new line)	Towards 22 platforms
M	Transfer level (Foshan Line 6)	Towards 12 and 24 platforms
