= Yuexiu Park station =

Guangzhou Metro station

Coordinates: 23.1402°N 113.2612°E

Yuexiu Park 越秀公园
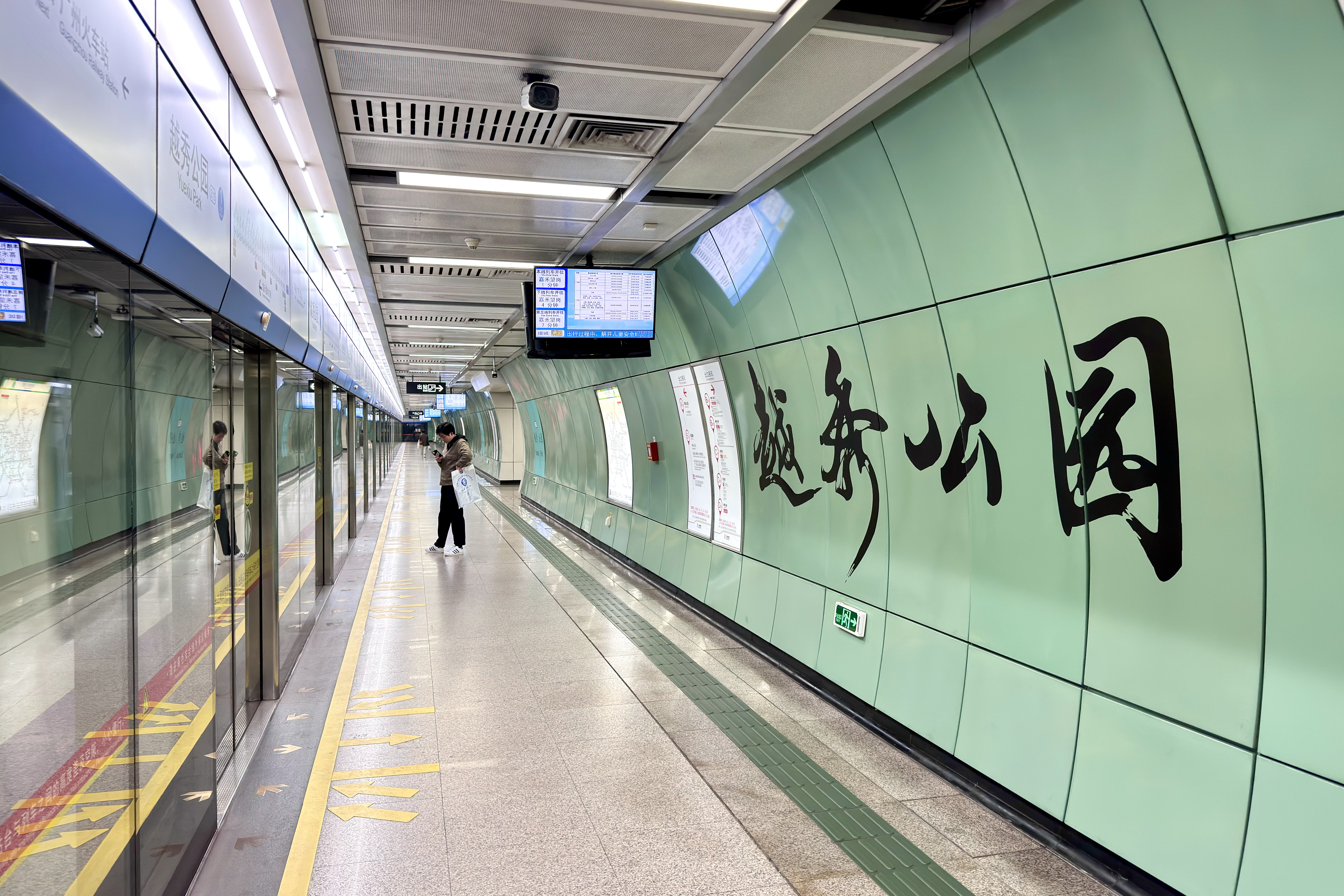

Chinese name
- Simplified Chinese: 越秀公园站
- Traditional Chinese: 越秀公園站
Transcriptions
Standard Mandarin
- Hanyu Pinyin: Yuèxiù Gōngyuán Zhàn
Yue: Cantonese
- Yale Romanization: Yuhtsau Gūng'yún Jaahm
- Jyutping: Jyut6sau3 Gung1jyun4 Zaam6
- Hong Kong Romanization: Yuet Sau Park station

General information
- Location: Yuexiu District, Guangzhou, Guangdong; China
- Operated by: Guangzhou Metro Co. Ltd.
- Line: Line 2
- Platforms: 2 (1 split island platform)

Construction
- Structure type: Underground

Other information
- Station code: 215

History
- Opened: 29 December 2002; 23 years ago

Services
Preceding station	Guangzhou Metro	Following station
Sun Yat-sen Memorial Hall towards Guangzhou South Railway Station	Line 2	Guangzhou Railway Station towards Jiahewanggang
Location

Yuexiu Park Station (simplified Chinese: 越秀公园站; traditional Chinese: 越秀公園站; Jyutping: jyut6 sau3 gung1 jyun2 zaam6; Cantonese Yale: Yuhtsau Gūng'yún Jaahm) is a station on Line 2 of the Guangzhou Metro that started operations on 29 December 2002. It is located under Yuexiu Park at the intersection of North Jiefang Road (解放北路) and Liuhua Road (流花路).

== Nearby places ==
- China Hotel
- Chinese Export and Import Commodities Fair (Liuhua) Complex, former home to the Canton Fair
- Dongfang Hotel
- Lanbu (Orchid Park)
- Nanyue King Museum
- Yuexiu Mountain (Yuexiu Park)
