= Line 24 (Guangzhou Metro) =

Under construction metro line in Guangzhou, China

- 24

Overview
- Native name: 广州地铁24号线
- Status: Under construction
- Owner: City of Guangzhou
- Termini: Guangzhou North Railway Station; Sun Yat-sen Memorial Hall
- Stations: 18

Service
- Type: Rapid transit
- System: Guangzhou Metro
- Services: 1
- Operator(s): Guangzhou Metro Corporation

Technical
- Line length: 31.7 km (19.70 mi)
- Number of tracks: 2
- Character: Underground
- Track gauge: 1,435 mm (4 ft 8 1/2 in)
- Operating speed: 100 km/h (62.14 mph)

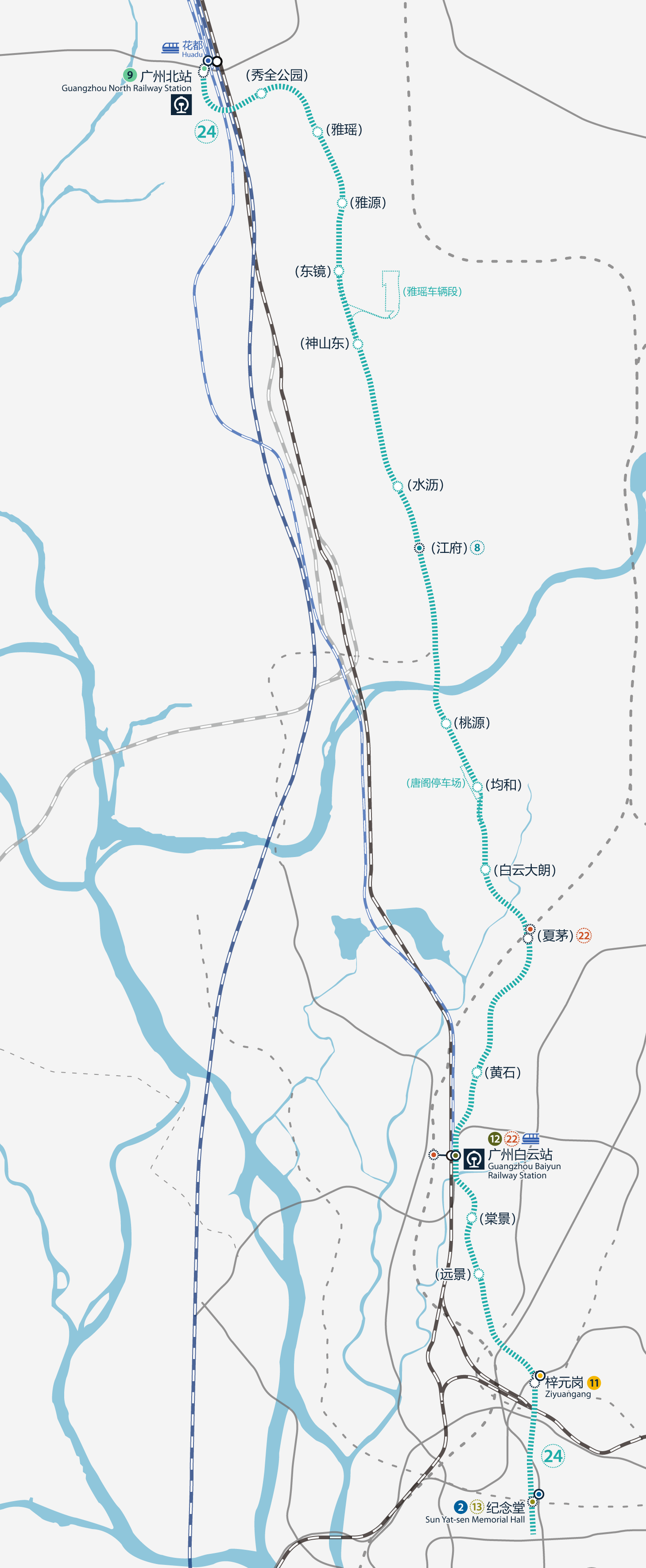
Line 24 drawn to scale

Line 24 of the Guangzhou Metro is an under construction rapid transit line in Guangzhou, Guangdong Province, China. The whole line runs roughly from north to south, connecting Huadu District, Baiyun District, Yuexiu District and Haizhu District, and connects two railway hubs, Guangzhou North railway station and Guangzhou Baiyun railway station. Line 24 will use 6-car Type A trains similar to Line 8.

== Planning ==
In 2014, the Guangzhou Municipal Planning Bureau revealed that it was studying the extension of Line 8 through to Jianggao station, and then along National Highway 107 to Guangzhou North Railway Station in Huadu District. This section was known as the North-North Extension of Line 8 as it was the north extension of the first North Extension project of Line 8 that brought the line up to Jiaoxin station. The project was approved by the National Development and Reform Commission in late March 2017. However, project was somewhat controversial as experts and the public have expressed doubts about the extension plan from an operations perspective, as with the completion of the North-North Extension, the total length of Line 8 from Guangzhou North Station to Wanshengwei station will exceed 50 kilometers. Being that the maximum operating speed of Line 8 is only 80 kilometers per hour and the entire line has moderate stop spacings, it was questioned whether a normal subway line should be this long. In response to these concerns, planners decided to reserve for the line to be split at Jiangfu Station, leaving the Jiangfu to Guangzhou North Station section to spun off from Line 8 extended south as an independently operated new line also known as Line 24.

The latest plans for Line 24 show the line running from Guangzhou North to Jiangfu Stations, taking over most of the North-North Extension of Line 8 project outright, and continuing south to Sun Yat-sen Memorial Hall station. The first section of Line 24 is planned to start construction in 2021 and be completed in 2025. In the future Line 24 will be extended further south to Shixi station.

Line 24 is part of Phase 3 adjustment plan of Guangzhou Metro, now under review by the National Development and Reform Commission as of September 2022.

However, according to the latest environmental impact assessment announcement, Line 24 is used as an extension of Line 8 to announce the line design information. The part to the north of Jiangfu Station is taken as part of the further north extension of Line 8, and the part to the south of Jiangfu Station is taken as the "Subline of the North Extension of Line 8". Even so, the line specifications of these two parts are still configured according to the separate Line 24.

== Stations ==
- Under construction

Project name	Station name		Connections	Future Connections	Location
Project name	English	Chinese	Connections	Future Connections	Location
Main line of the North Extension of Line 8	Guangzhou North Railway Station	广州北站	9 903		Huadu
Main line of the North Extension of Line 8	Xiuquan Park	秀全公园			Huadu
Main line of the North Extension of Line 8	Yayao	雅瑶			Huadu
Main line of the North Extension of Line 8	Yayuan	雅源			Huadu
Main line of the North Extension of Line 8	Dongjing	东镜			Huadu
Main line of the North Extension of Line 8	Shenshan East	神山东			Baiyun
Main line of the North Extension of Line 8	Shuili	水沥			Baiyun
Main line of the North Extension of Line 8	Jiangfu	江府		8	Baiyun
Subline of the North Extension of Line 8	Taoyuan	桃源			Baiyun
Subline of the North Extension of Line 8	Junhe	均禾			Baiyun
Subline of the North Extension of Line 8	Baiyun Dalang	白云大朗			Baiyun
Subline of the North Extension of Line 8	Xiamao	夏茅		22	Baiyun
Subline of the North Extension of Line 8	Huangshi	黄石			Baiyun
Subline of the North Extension of Line 8	Guangzhou Baiyun Railway Station	广州白云站	12 1205; GBA; GQ	22	Baiyun
Subline of the North Extension of Line 8	Tangjing	棠景			Baiyun
Subline of the North Extension of Line 8	Yuanjing	远景			Baiyun
Subline of the North Extension of Line 8	Ziyuangang	梓元岗	11 1113		Baiyun
Subline of the North Extension of Line 8	Sun Yat-sen Memorial Hall	纪念堂	2 214	13 1310	Yuexiu
