= Guangzhou–Zhanjiang high-speed railway =

High-speed railway line in Guangdong, China

Guangzhou–Zhanjiang High-speed Railway
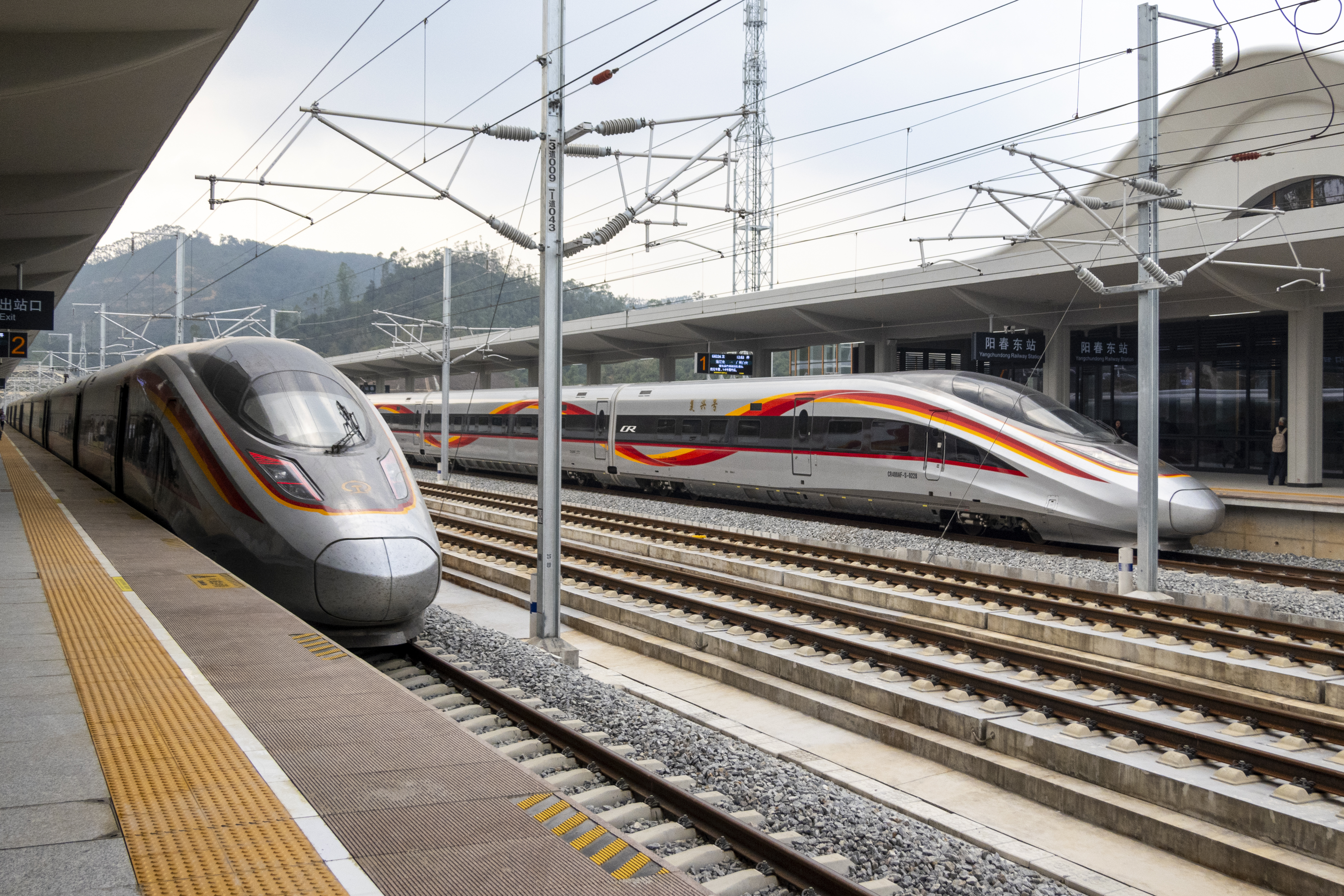
- CR400AF-S "Fuxing" EMUs at Yangchun East railway station

Overview
- Native name: 广湛高速铁路
- Status: In operation
- Owner: CR Guangzhou
- Locale: Guangdong province: Guangzhou, Foshan, Yunfu, Yangjiang, Maoming, Zhanjiang
- Termini: Guangzhou; Zhanjiang North (zh)
- Stations: 10

Service
- Type: High-speed rail
- System: China Railway High-speed
- Operator: CR Guangzhou

History
- Opened: 22 December 2025; 6 months ago

Technical
- Line length: 401 km (249 mi)
- Track gauge: 1,435 mm (4 ft 8 1/2 in) standard gauge
- Electrification: 25 kV 50 Hz AC (Overhead line)
- Operating speed: 350 km/h (217 mph)

Guangzhou–Zhanjiang railway
- Simplified Chinese: 广湛高速铁路
- Traditional Chinese: 廣湛高速鐵路
Transcriptions
Standard Mandarin
- Hanyu Pinyin: Guǎngzhàn Gāosù Tiělù
Yue: Cantonese
- Jyutping: Gwong^{2}Zaam^{3}Gou^{1}Cuk^{1}Tit^{3}Lou^{6}

The Guangzhou–Zhanjiang high-speed railway (simplified Chinese: 广湛高速铁路; traditional Chinese: 廣湛高速鐵路; pinyin: Guǎngzhàn Gāosù Tiělù) is a high-speed railway across the south of Guangdong province. Currently it runs from Guangzhou to Zhanjiang North. It links the cities of Guangzhou and Zhanjiang. Its design speed is 350 kilometres per hour (220 mph).

== History ==
Construction of the line began on 30 September 2019. It opened on 22 December 2025.

== List of stations ==
Station Name		Opened	Transfer / Interchange	District	City	Pictures
English	Simplified Chinese (Traditional Chinese)	Opened	Transfer / Interchange	District	City	Pictures
Guangzhou	广州 (廣州)	12 April 1974	China Railway: Beijing–Guangzhou railway; Guangzhou–Shenzhen railway; Guangzhou–Qingyuan intercity railway; Guangzhou Metro: 2 5 11 14 22	Yuexiu	Guangzhou	
Foshan	佛山 (佛山)	8 January 1993	Foshan Metro: 3	Chancheng	Foshan	
Fozhao	佛肇 (佛肇)	TBA	CRH: Nanning–Zhuhai high-speed railway	Gaoming	Foshan	
Xinxing South (Xinxingnan)	新兴南 (新興南)	22 December 2025		Xinxing	Yunfu	
Yangchun East (Yangchundong)	阳春东 (陽春東)	22 December 2025		Yangchun	Yangjiang	
Yangjiang North (Yangjiangbei)	阳江北 (陽江北)	22 December 2025		Jiangcheng	Yangjiang	
Yangxi	阳西 (陽西)	1 July 2018	CRH: Shenzhen–Zhanjiang high-speed railway	Yangxi	Yangjiang	
Mata	马踏 (馬踏)	1 July 2018	CRH: Shenzhen–Zhanjiang high-speed railway	Dianbai	Maoming	
Maoming South (Maomingnan)	茂名南 (茂名南)	22 December 2025		Dianbai	Maoming	
Wuchuan	吴川 (吳川)	1 July 2018	CRH: Shenzhen–Zhanjiang high-speed railway	Wuchuan	Zhanjiang	
Zhanjiang East (Zhanjiangdong)	湛江东 (湛江東)	TBA		Potou	Zhanjiang	
Zhanjiang North (Zhanjiangbei)	湛江北 (湛江北)	22 December 2025	CRH: Zhanjiang–Haikou high-speed railway	Xiashan	Zhanjiang	
