= Sun Yat-sen Memorial Hall station (Guangzhou Metro) =

Guangzhou Metro station

Coordinates: 23.1324°N 113.2633°E

Sun Yat-sen Memorial Hall 纪念堂
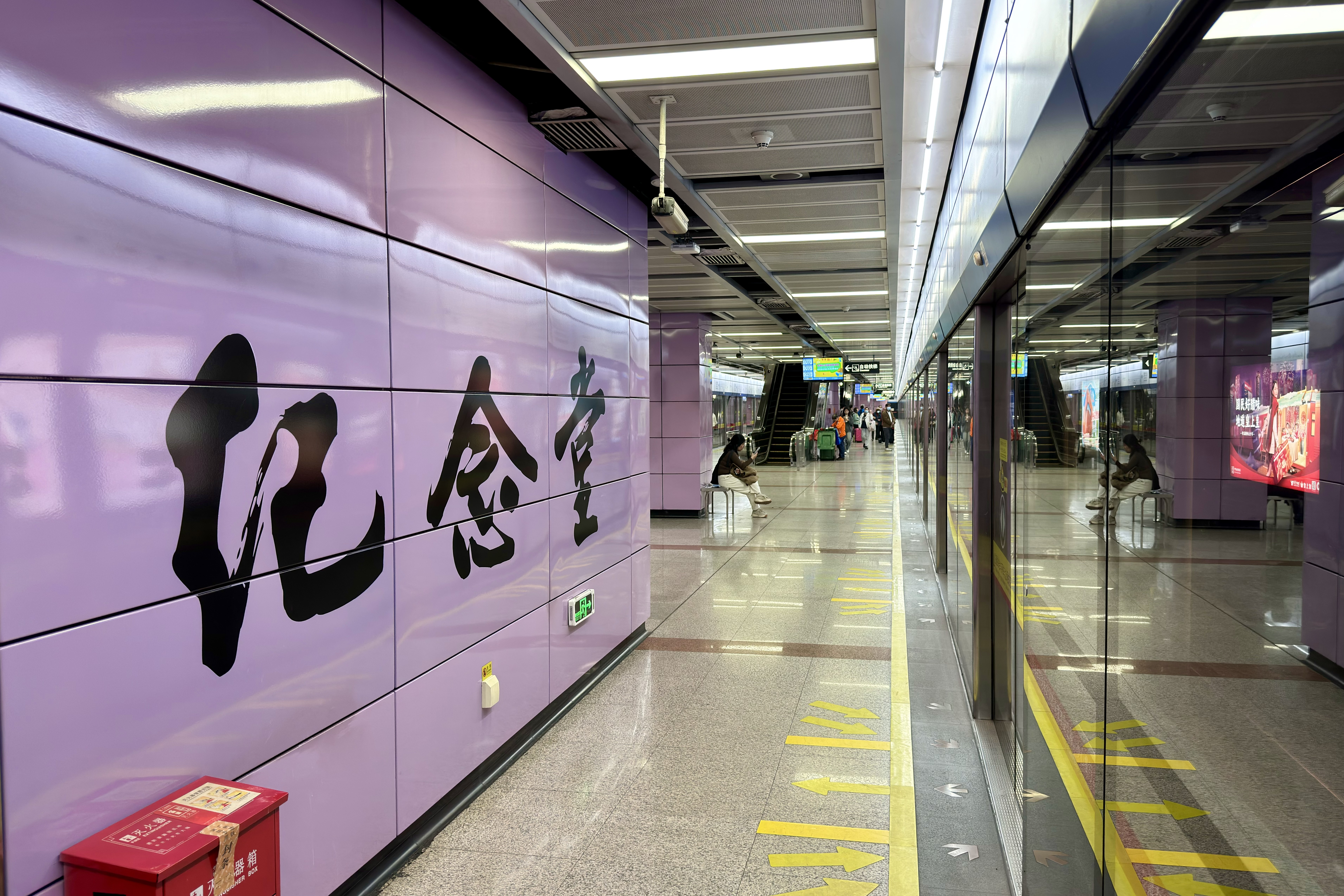

Chinese name
- Traditional Chinese: 紀念堂站
- Simplified Chinese: 纪念堂站
Transcriptions
Standard Mandarin
- Hanyu Pinyin: Jìniàntáng Zhàn
Yue: Cantonese
- Yale Romanization: Géinihmtòhng Jaahm
- Jyutping: Gei2nim6tong4 Zaam6

General information
- Location: Yuexiu District, Guangzhou, Guangdong; China
- Operated by: Guangzhou Metro Co. Ltd.
- Lines: Line 2; Line 13 (2026); Line 24 (U/C)
- Platforms: 2 (1 island platform)

Construction
- Structure type: Underground

Other information
- Station code: 214

History
- Opened: 29 December 2002; 23 years ago

Services
Preceding station	Guangzhou Metro	Following station
Gongyuanqian towards Guangzhou South Railway Station	Line 2	Yuexiu Park towards Jiahewanggang
Future services
Caihong Bridge towards Chaoyang	Line 13	Cangbian Road towards Xinsha
Ziyuangang towards Guangzhou North Railway Station	Line 24	Terminus
Location

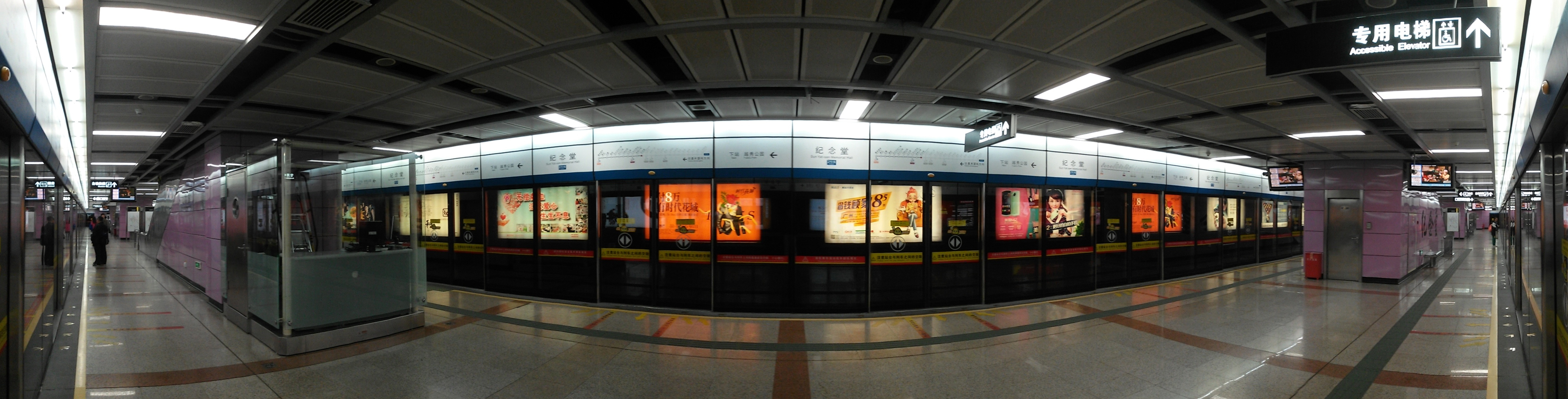
The platform

Sun Yat-sen Memorial Hall Station (simplified Chinese: 纪念堂站; traditional Chinese: 紀念堂站; Jyutping: gei2 nim6 tong4 zaam6; Cantonese Yale: Géinihmtòhng Jaahm) is a station on Line 2 of the Guangzhou Metro that started operations on 29 December 2002. It is located under Dongfeng Middle Road (东风中路) and Lianxin Road (连新路) in the Yuexiu District of Guangzhou. The station is named for the Sun Yat Sen Memorial Hall, which was established in 1931 in memory of Dr. Sun Yat-Sen, the founder of the Republic of China. The English name of the station is the same as that of Sun Yat-sen Memorial Hall Station in Taipei, Taiwan's Metro system.

== Nearby Places ==
- Sun Yat Sen Memorial Hall
- Yuexiu Park
- Yuexiushan Stadium
- Guangdong Provincial People's Government
- Guangzhou No.2 High School
- Guangdong Science Meseum
- Guangzhou City People's Congress Standing Committee
- Guangzhou General Labour Union
