= China Railway Siyuan Survey and Design Group =

China Railway Siyuan Survey and Design Group Co., Ltd. (Chinese: 中铁第四勘察设计院集团有限公司), referred to as Tiesiyuan (Chinese: 铁四院) or Siyuan (Chinese: 四院), is a Chinese engineering survey and design enterprises, under the China Railway Construction Corporation, headquartered in Wuhan, Hubei Province.
