= Longgui =

Longgui may refer to:

- Dragon turtle (龍龜; lóngguī), legendary Chinese creature
- Longgui Subdistrict, Baiyun District, Guangzhou, Guangdong, China
- Longgui, Shaoguan, town in Wujiang District, Shaoguan, Guangdong, China
- Longgui Park in Magong, Penghu, Taiwan
