= Nengren Temple =

Nengren Temple (Chinese: 能仁寺; pinyin: Néngrén Sì) may refer to:

- Nengren Temple (Jiujiang), in Jiujiang, Jiangxi, China
- Nengren Temple (Guangzhou), on Mount Baiyun, in Guangzhou, Guangdong, China
