= Jiahe =

Jiahe (Chinese: 嘉禾) may refer to:

- Jiahe County, a county of Chenzhou, Hunan Province, China
- Jiahe Subdistrict, Guangzhou, a subdistrict of Baiyun District, Guangzhou, Guangdong Province, China
- Jiahe Subdistrict, Suining, a subdistrict of Chuanshan District, Suining, Sichuan Province, China
- Ancient name of Jiaxing, Zhejiang Province, China
- Sun Quan's third era name

== See also ==
- Jiaohe (disambiguation)
