= Pengbian station =

Guangzhou Metro Line 14 station

Pengbian 彭边
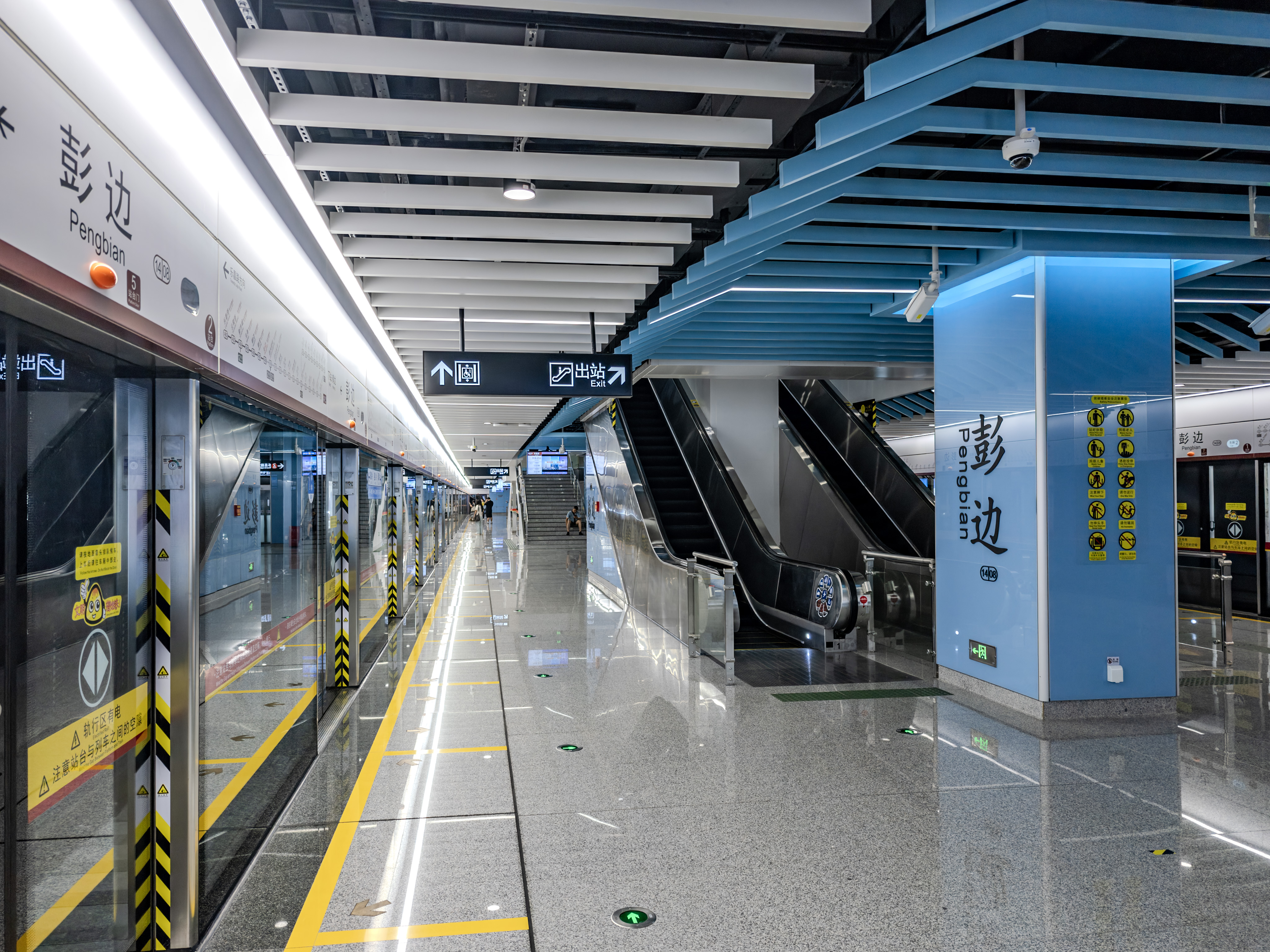
- Platform 2

Chinese name
- Simplified Chinese: 彭边站
- Traditional Chinese: 彭邊站
Transcriptions
Standard Mandarin
- Hanyu Pinyin: Péngbiān Zhàn
Yue: Cantonese
- Yale Romanization: Pàahngbīn Jaahm
- Jyutping: paang4 bin1 zaam6

General information
- Location: South side of Jianpeng Road (尖彭路), near the intersection with Pengxi Hualian Road (彭西华联路); Jiahe Subdistrict, Baiyun District, Guangzhou, Guangdong; China
- Coordinates: 23°13′46.99″N 113°16′33.28″E
- Operator: Guangzhou Metro Co. Ltd.
- Line: Line 14
- Platforms: 2 (1 island platform)
- Tracks: 2

Construction
- Structure type: Underground
- Accessible: Yes

Other information
- Station code: 1408

History
- Opened: 29 September 2025 (10 months ago)

Services
Preceding station	Guangzhou Metro	Following station
Helong towards Lejia Road	Line 14	Jiahewanggang towards Dongfeng
Location

Pengbian station (simplified Chinese: 彭边站; traditional Chinese: 彭邊站; pinyin: Péngbiān Zhàn; Cantonese Yale: Pàahngbīn Jaahm) is a station on Line 14 of the Guangzhou Metro. It is located on the south side of Jianpeng Road, near the intersection with Pengxi Hualian Road on the north side of the planned Guangzhou Design City West Expansion Area, in the Jiahe Subdistrict of Baiyun District in Guangzhou. It opened on 29 September 2025.

== Station layout ==
=== Station Floorings ===
Pengbian Station has three floors, with a length of 161.75 metres (530.7 ft) and a width of 21.9 metres (72 ft). The ground floor houses the station's exits, and is surrounded by Jianpeng Road, the Guangzhou-Foshan-Zhaoqing Expressway, and nearby buildings. The first floor houses the station's equipment level, the second floor is the station concourse, and the third floor houses the Line 14 platform.

Pengbian station is the first Guangzhou Metro station built on a coal mining area, and is also the first metro station in mainland China to use UHPC prefabrication and assembly technology.

=== Concourse ===
The station concourse features ticket vending machines and an intelligent customer service center. A dedicated elevator, multiple escalators, and stairs within the fare collection area provide convenient access to the platforms.

=== Platforms ===
The station has an island platform located underground on the south side of Jianpeng Road. Toilets and a nursing room are located at the end of the platform towards Helong.

=== Entrances/exits ===
The station has 4 points of entry/exit. Among them, the C2 entrance/exit passage passes under the Guangzhou-Foshan-Zhaoqing Expressway and several pipelines. It is the first entrance and exit passage in mainland China to be constructed using the shield method. Exit D is equipped with an elevator.

- B: Jianpeng Road, Lianbian Pengxi Hualian Road, Yunqi Road
- C1: Jianpeng Road
- C2: Jianpeng Road, Lianbian Pengxi Dexing Road
- D: Jianpeng Road
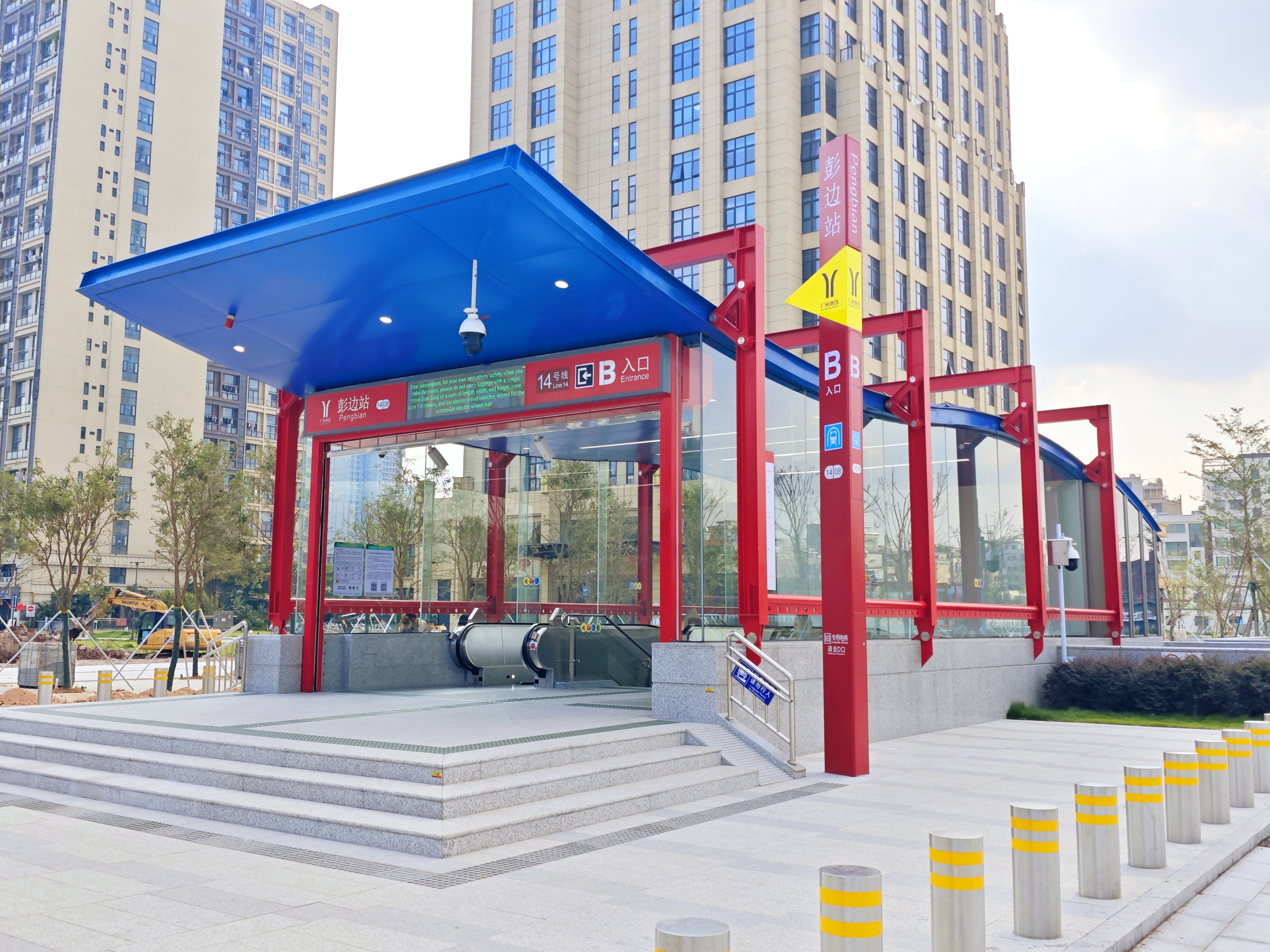
Entrance B

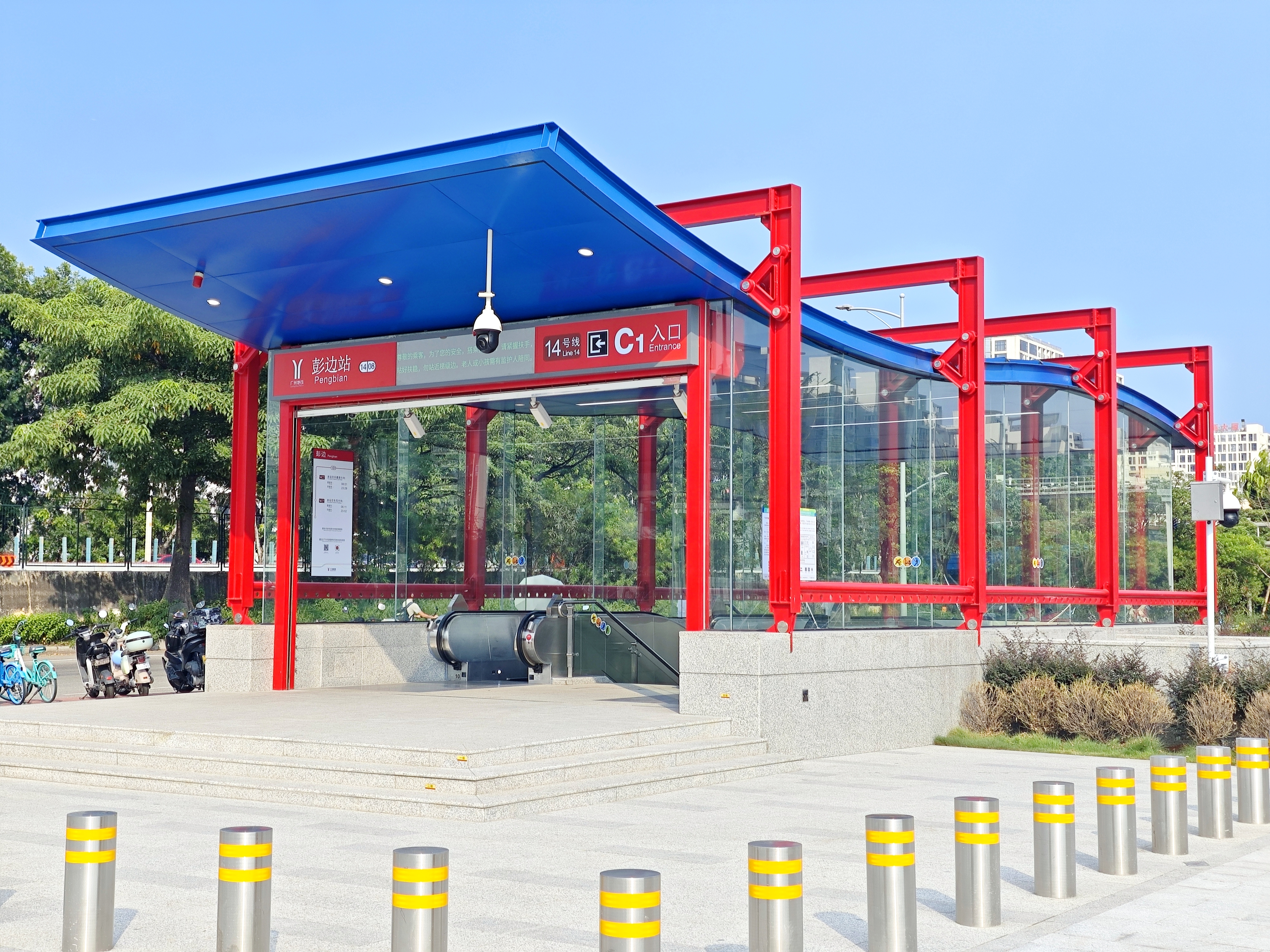
Entrance C1

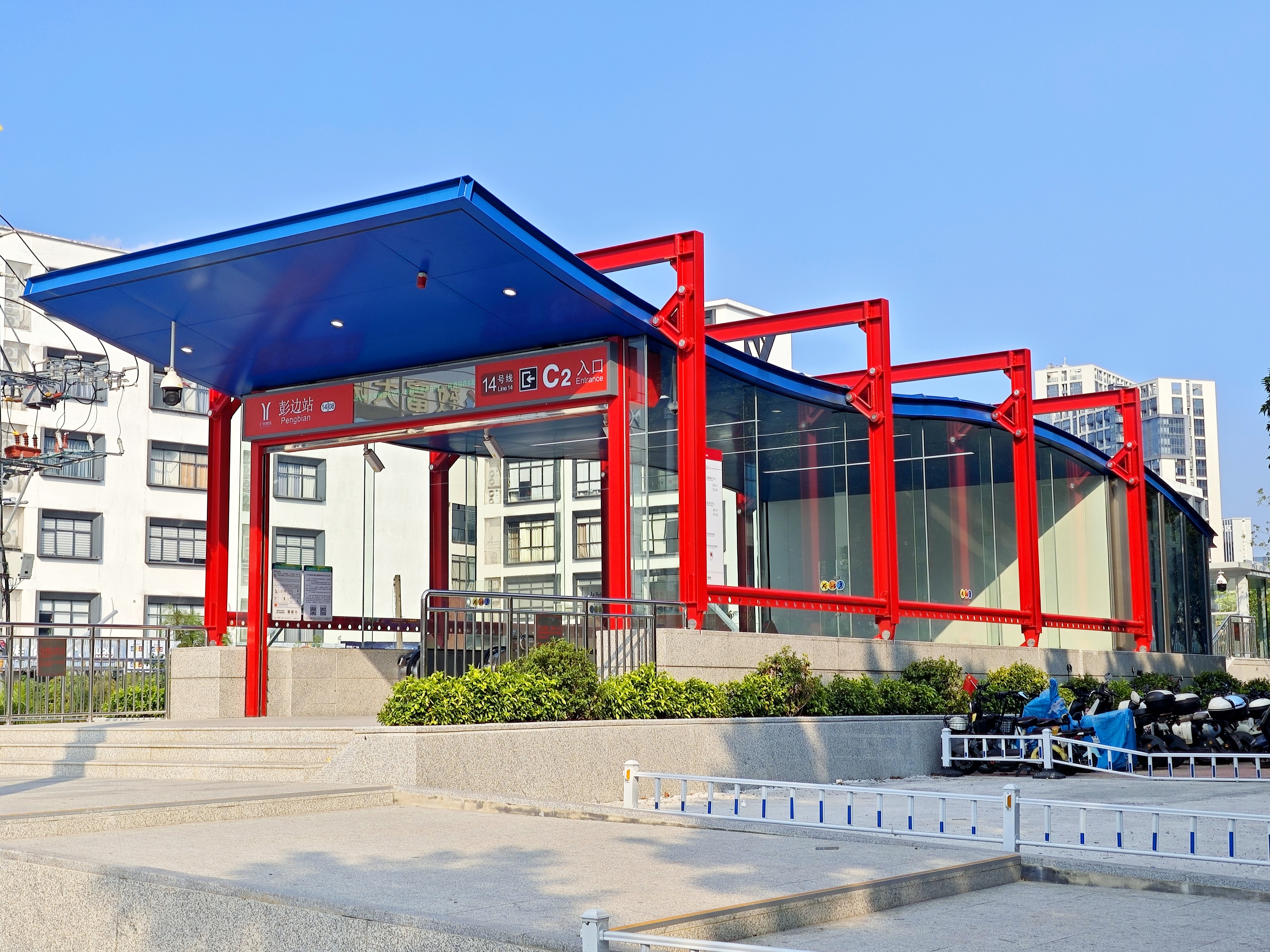
Entrance C2

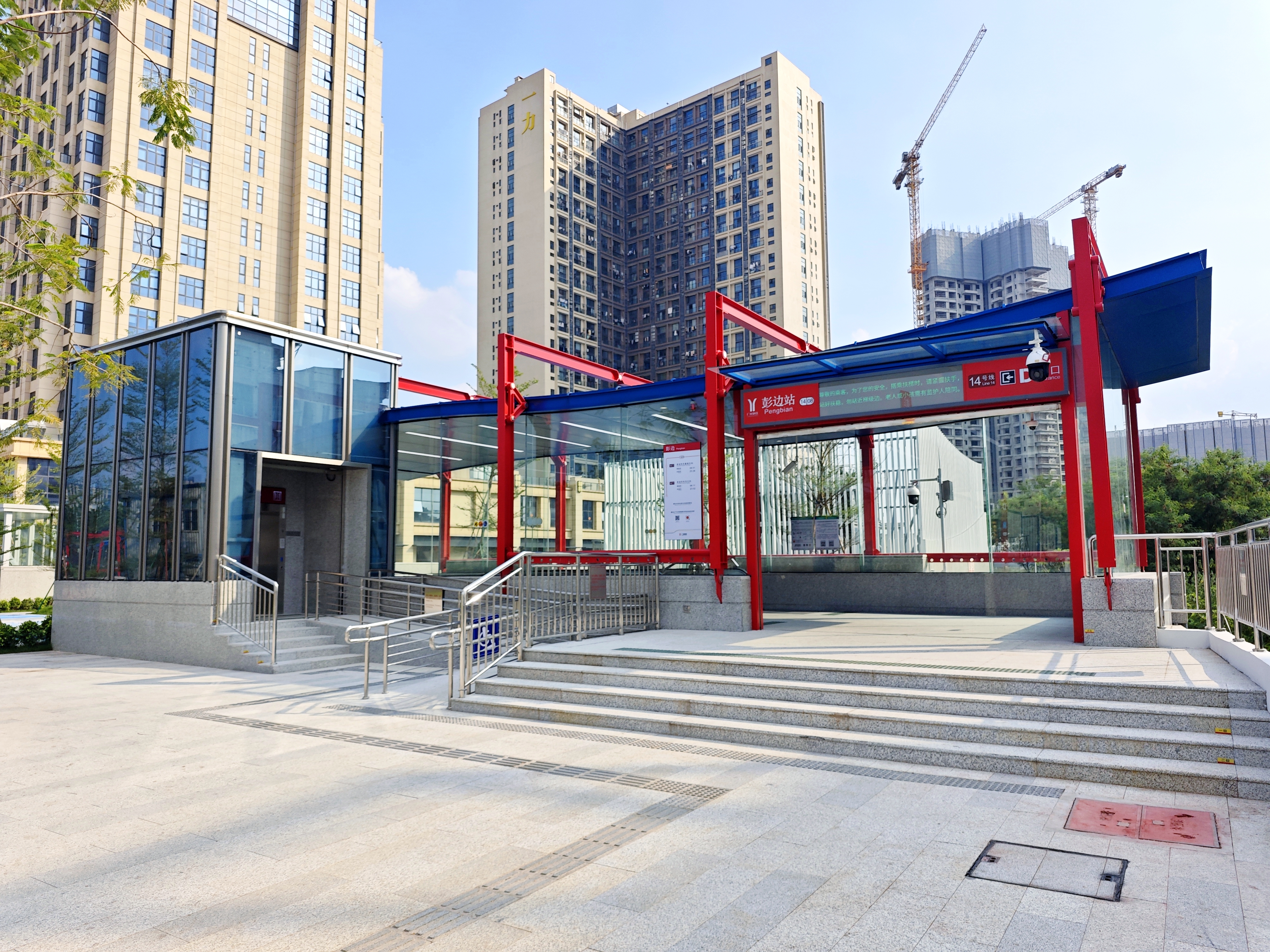
Entrance D

== Gallery ==
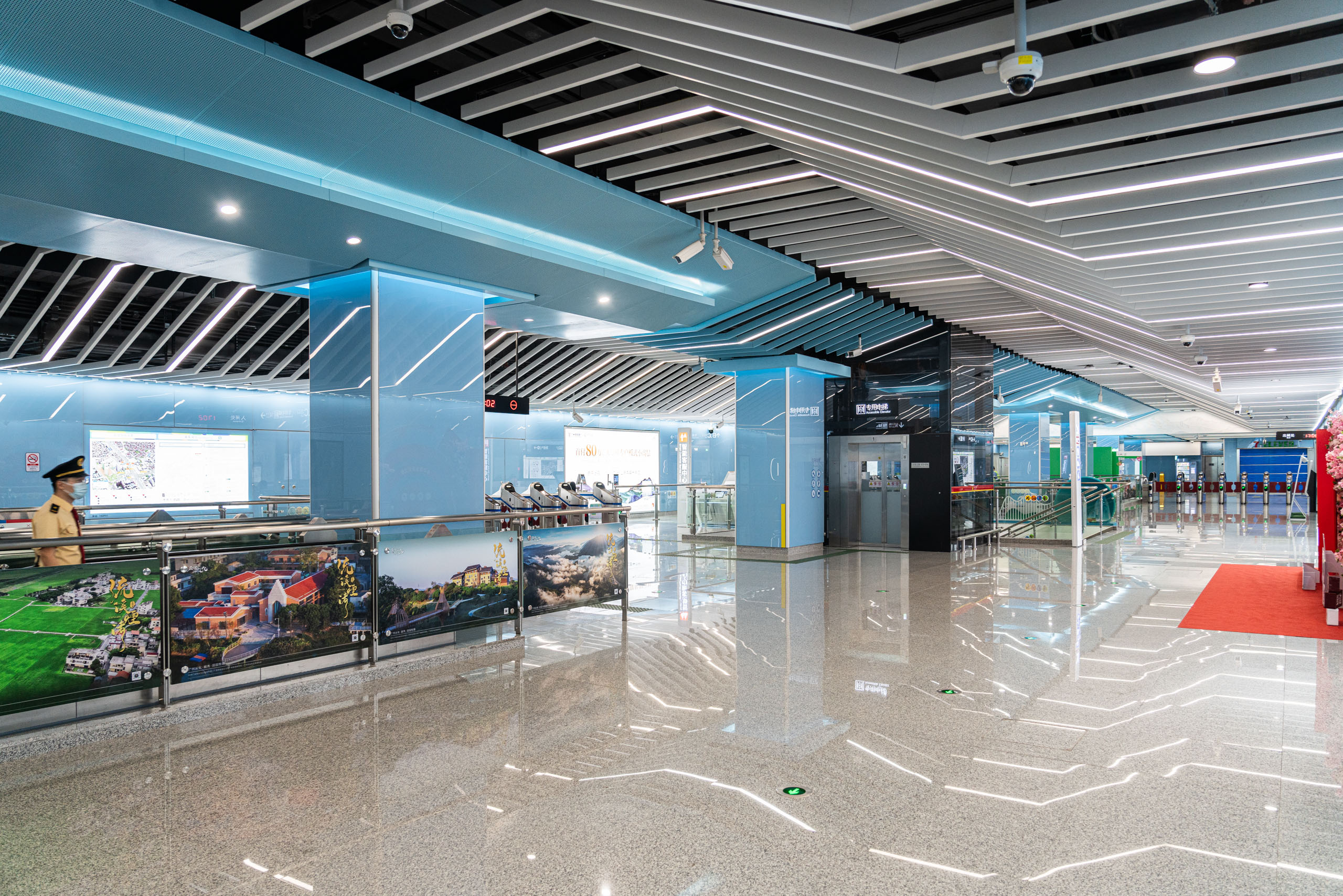
Concourse

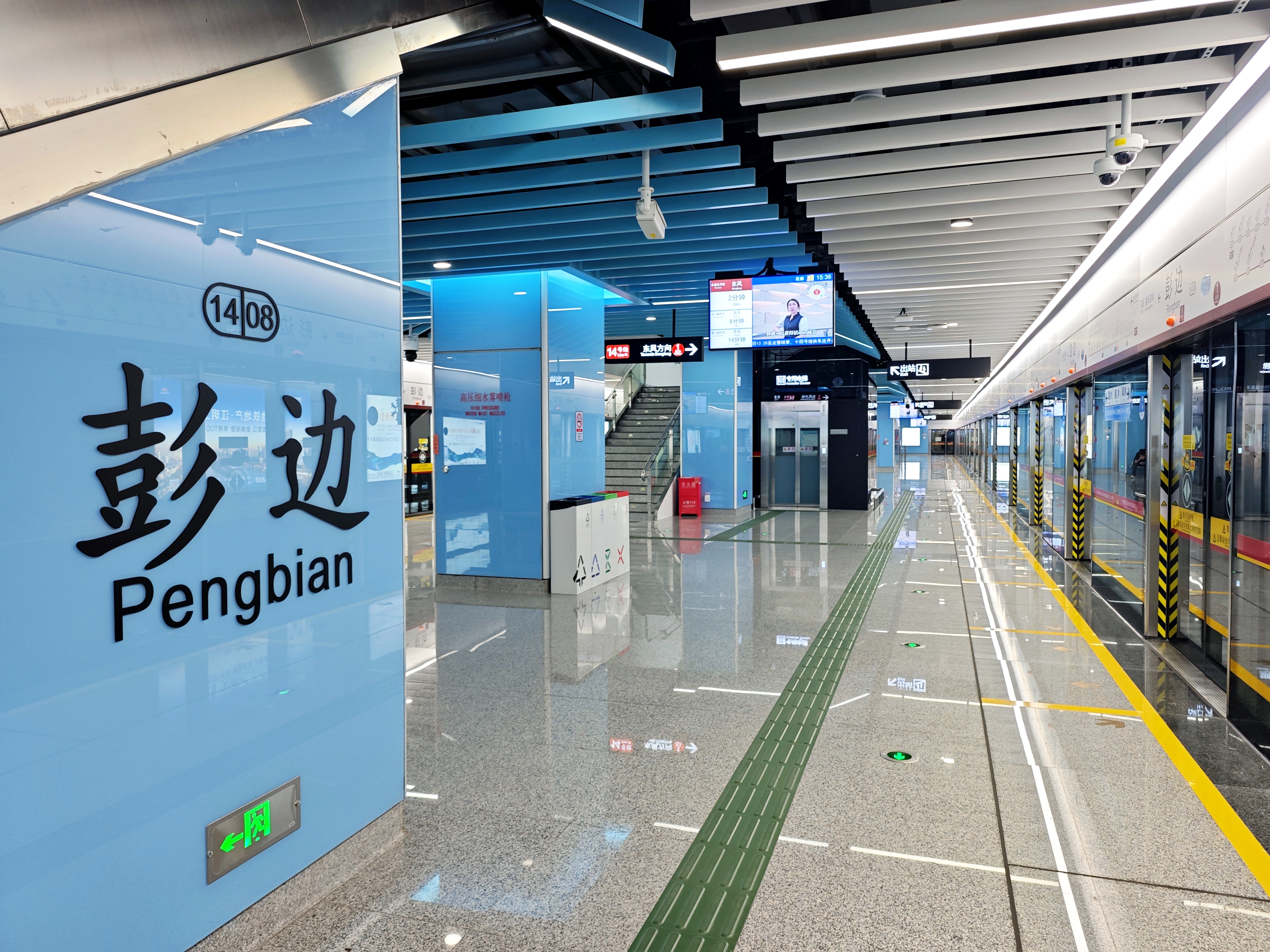
Platform 1

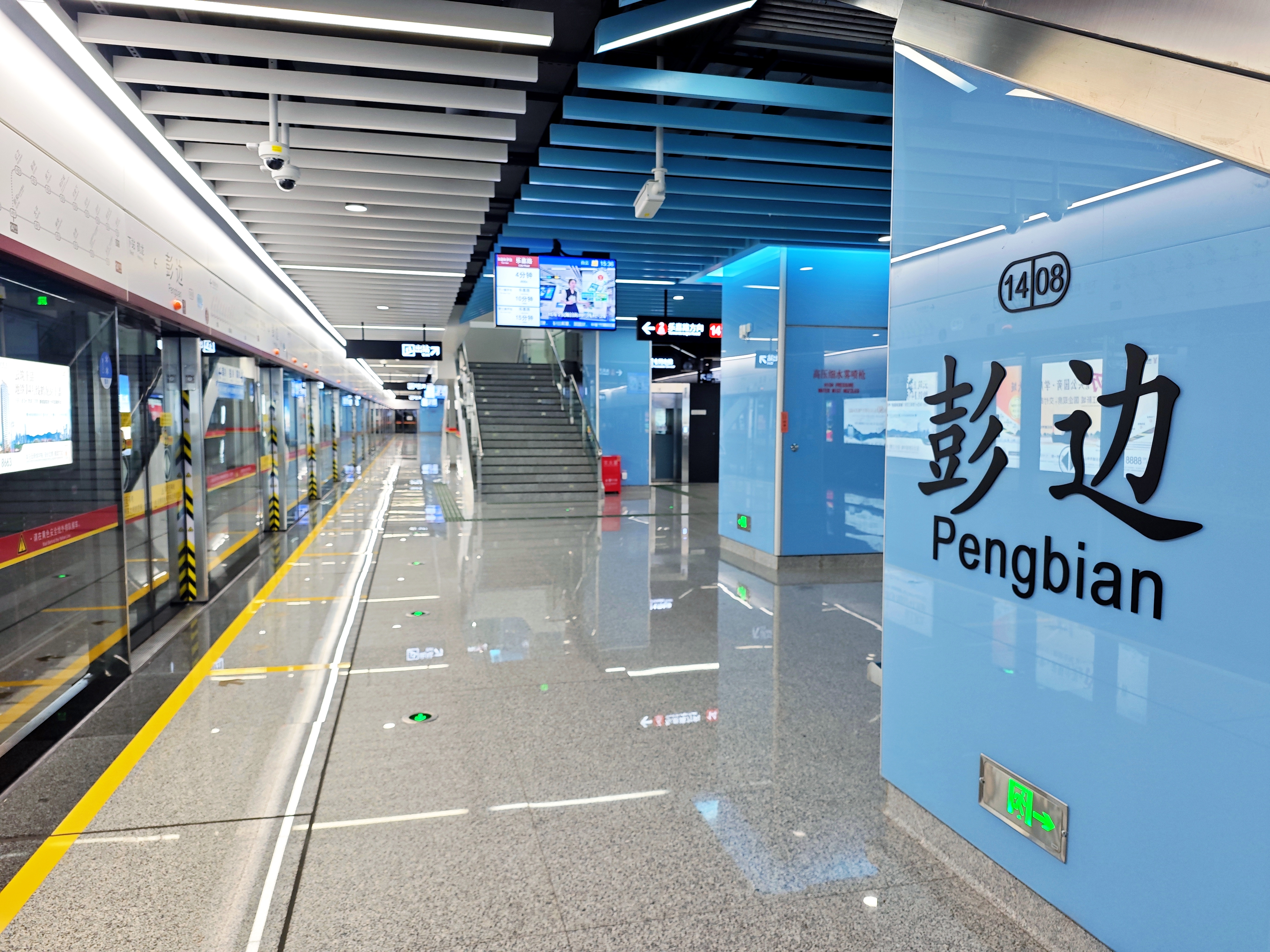
Platform 2

== History ==
When Phase 2 of Line 14 was approved, Pengbian station didn't exist in the plans at the time. Subsequently, a CPPCC member proposed the addition of a Pengbian station, which was adopted by the Guangzhou Municipal Government and eventually implemented.

Construction of the station started on 28 January 2019. In May 2023, the main structure of the station was topped out, making it the first station to be topped out in Phase 2 of Line 14. In April 2025, the station completed the “three rights” transfer. The station opened on 29 September 2025.
