= Xuelei Fragrance Museum =

Museum in Guangzhou, China

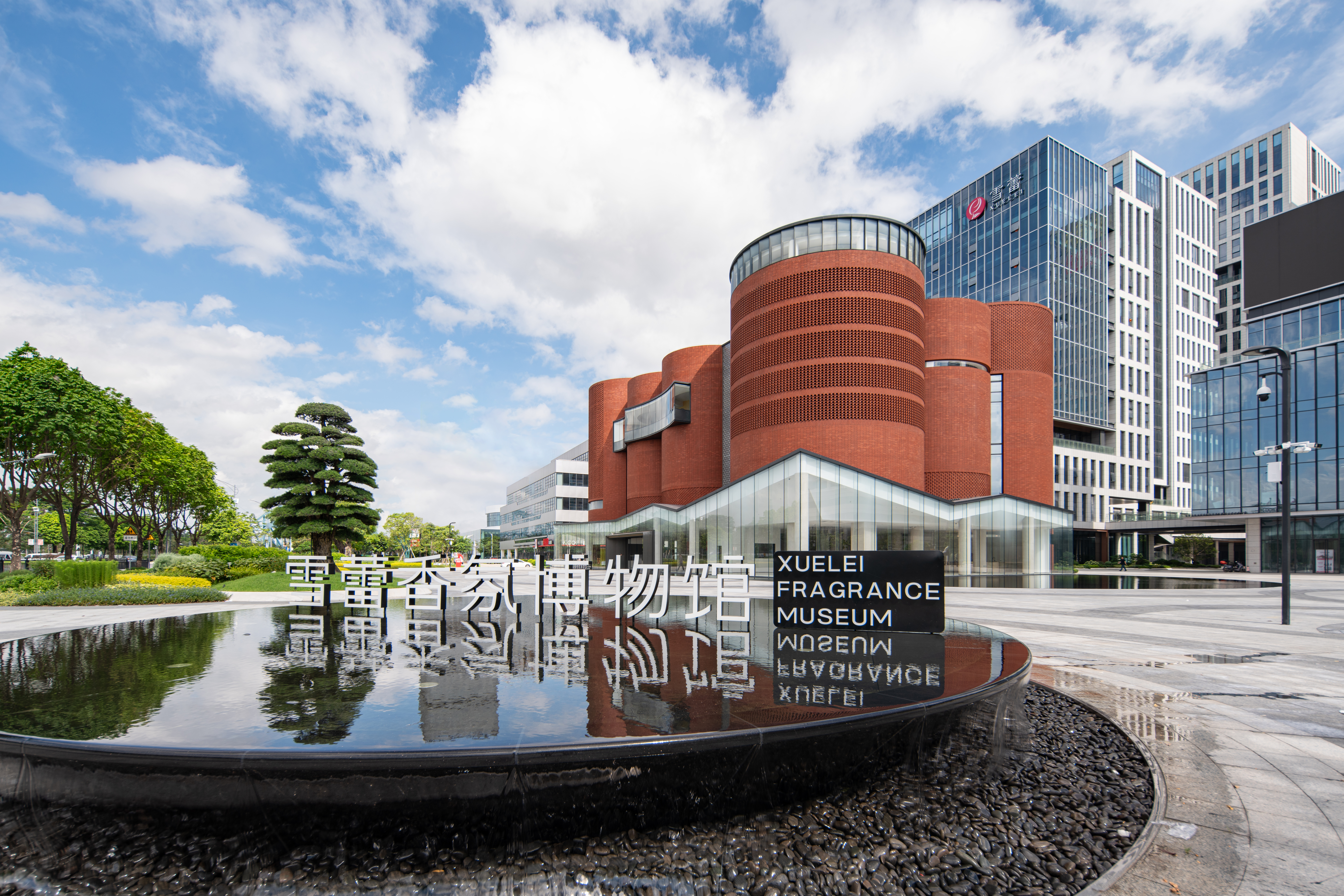
- Xuelei Fragrance Museum
- Established: July 10, 2025
- Location: Baiyun District, Guangzhou, Guangdong, China
- Coordinates: 23.2982°N 113.3132°E
- Founder: Weng Zhenguo
- Director: Weng Haocong

The Xuelei Fragrance Museum is a fragrance-themed museum located in the Baiyun District of Guangzhou, Guangdong Province, China. Invested and constructed by Guangdong Xuelei Fragrance Culture Co., Ltd., the museum was founded by Weng Zhenguo, with Weng Haocong serving as its inaugural director. Characterized by its immersive olfactory experience spaces, the museum officially opened to the public on July 10, 2025. On November 27, 2025, it was officially certified by Guinness World Records as the "Largest Fragrance Museum."

== History ==
As a strategic component of Baiyun District's "One Park, One City, One Demonstration Zone" initiative, the museum was designated as a key municipal construction project in Guangzhou. The project spans a total site area of approximately 18,000 square meters, with a total floor area of around 7,000 square meters, making it the largest fragrance museum in the world to date. The preparatory phase began in September 2021, leading to its formal grand opening on July 10, 2025.

== Architecture and design ==
The museum comprises six floors with a total construction area of approximately 7,000 square meters. Its architectural form is an abstract interpretation of a perfume still, topped by a cluster of eight red-brick cylinders of varying sizes. The facade features hand-laid red brickwork, while the ground floor utilizes ultra-white glass and ceramic frit glass. The central atrium employs curved stonework and natural skylights to create a sense of architectural ritual. The fifth floor houses the Sky Fragrance Garden, which features aromatic flora and spice plants sourced from across the globe.

== Exhibitions ==
The museum features two core exhibition zones: "The World Fragrance Exhibition" and "Synesthesia of Scent Exhibition." It is equipped with an AI-driven perfume blending system, over 50 interactive installations, and more than 300 scent-sampling points. Furthermore, the museum has partnered with Shanghai Jiao Tong University to establish the "Chinese Ingredients: Botanical Fragrance and Essential Oil Scientific Evaluation and Testing Center (South China Base)."

== Honors ==
On November 27, 2025, the institution was awarded the Guinness World Record for the "Largest Fragrance Museum" (with an immersive space measuring 9,500.878 square meters). "In May 2026, it was selected for the Prix Versailles list of the"World's Most Beautiful Museums".
