= Xinshi Subdistrict, Guangzhou =

Xinshi Subdistrict 新市街道
- Subdistrict
- Location in Guangdong
- Coordinates: 23°11′57″N 113°15′24″E
- Country: People's Republic of China
- Province: Guangdong
- Sub-provincial city: Guangzhou
- District: Baiyun
- Village-level divisions: 19 residential communities
- Elevation: 10 m (33 ft)
- Time zone: UTC+8 (China Standard)
- Postal code: 510410
- Area code: 0020

Xinshi Subdistrict (Chinese: 新市街道; pinyin: Xīnshì Jiēdào; lit. 'new city') is a subdistrict of Baiyun District, Guangzhou, located immediately to the west of the former Baiyun Airport. As of 2011, it has 19 residential communities (社区) under its administration.

== See also ==
- List of township-level divisions of Guangdong
