= Baiyunhu Subdistrict =

Subdistrict in Guangzhou, People's Republic of China

Baiyunhu Subdistrict 白云湖街道
- Subdistrict
- Interactive map of Baiyunhu Subdistrict
- Country: People's Republic of China
- Province: Guangdong
- Sub-provincial city: Guangzhou
- District: Baiyun
- Time zone: UTC+8 (China Standard Time)

Baiyunhu Subdistrict (Chinese: 白云湖街道; pinyin: Báiyúnhú Jiēdào; Jyutping: baak^{6} wan^{4} wu^{4} gaai^{1} dou^{6}) is a subdistrict of Baiyun District, Guangzhou, People's Republic of China. As of 2020, it has 15 residential communities (社区) under its administration.

== See also ==
- List of township-level divisions of Guangdong
