= Jingxi Subdistrict, Guangzhou =

Jingxi Subdistrict 京溪街道
- Subdistrict
- Location in Guangdong
- Coordinates: 23°11′21″N 113°19′21″E
- Country: People's Republic of China
- Province: Guangdong
- Prefecture-level city: Guangzhou
- District: Baiyun District
- Time zone: UTC+8 (China Standard)

Jingxi Subdistrict (Chinese: 京溪街道; pinyin: Jīngxī Jiēdào) is a subdistrict in Baiyun District, Guangzhou, Guangdong province, China. As of 2020, it has 16 residential communities under its administration:

- Jingpeng Community (京鹏社区)
- Meihuayuan Community (梅花园社区)
- Southern Medical University Community (南方医科大学社区)
- Jinghai Community (京海社区)
- Hengjunhuayuan Community (恒骏花园社区)
- Jinglong Community (京龙社区)
- Jingyu Community (京宇社区)
- Baihuichang Community (白灰场社区)
- Jinglin Community (京麟社区)
- Dongsheng Community (东圣社区)
- Xiniujiao Community (犀牛角社区)
- Maidi Community (麦地社区)
- Jinlin Community (金麟社区)
- Meiyuan Community (梅苑社区)
- Yunjinghuayuan Community (云景花园社区)
- Baitian'ehuayuan Community (白天鹅花园社区)

== See also ==
- List of township-level divisions of Guangdong
