= Hebian station =

Guangzhou Metro Line 14 station

Hebian 鹤边
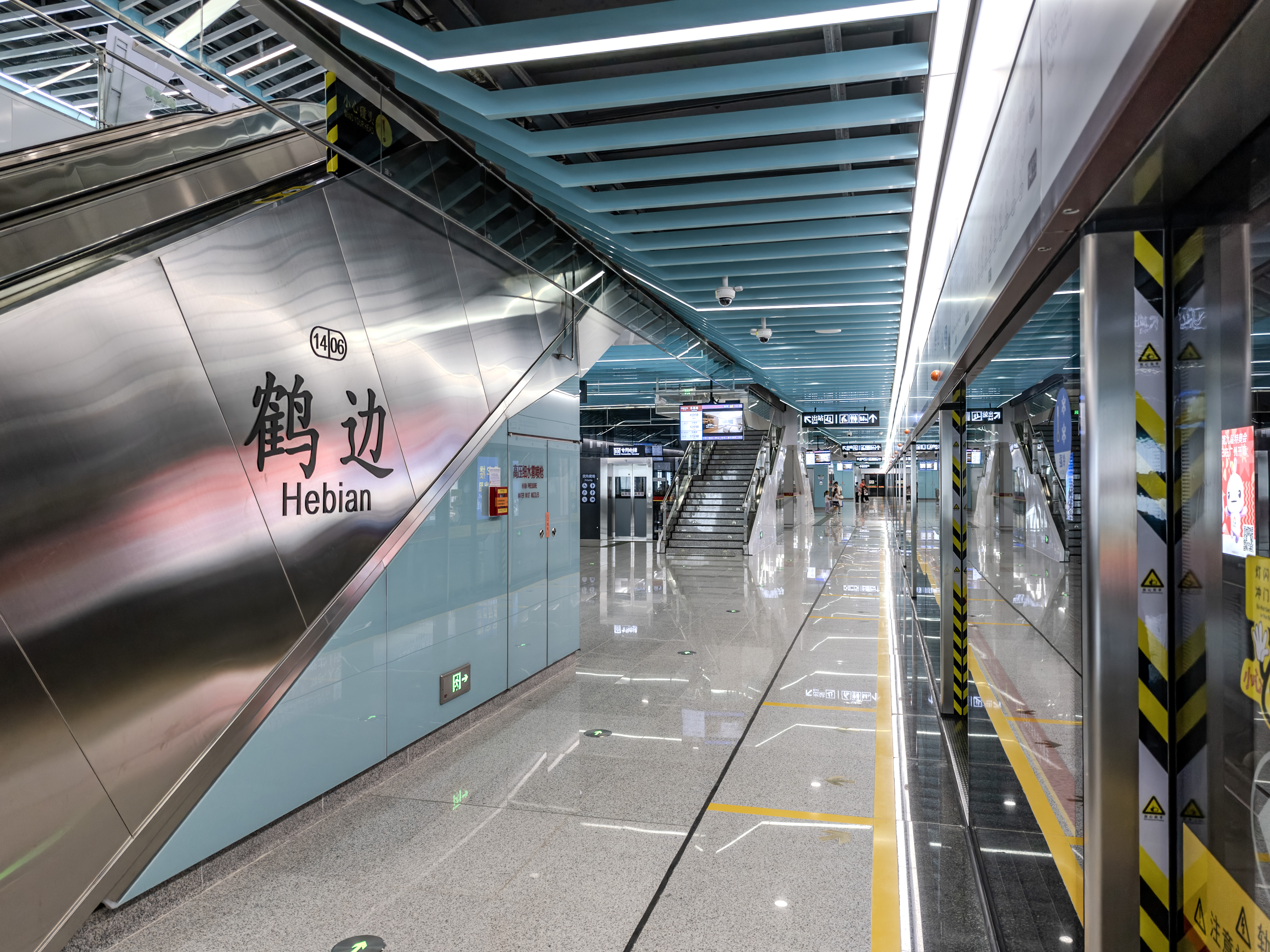
- Platform 1

Chinese name
- Simplified Chinese: 鹤边站
- Traditional Chinese: 鶴邊站
Transcriptions
Standard Mandarin
- Hanyu Pinyin: HèBiān Zhàn
Yue: Cantonese
- Yale Romanization: Hókbīn Jaahm
- Jyutping: hok6 bin1 zaam6

General information
- Location: Northwest of intersection between Helong 1st Road (鹤龙一路) and Helong 1st Cross Road (鹤龙一横路） Helong Subdistrict, Baiyun District, Guangzhou, Guangdong; China
- Coordinates: 23°12′54.18″N 113°15′39.67″E
- Operator: Guangzhou Metro Co. Ltd.
- Line: Line 14
- Platforms: 2 (1 island platform)
- Tracks: 2

Construction
- Structure type: Underground
- Accessible: Yes

Other information
- Station code: 1406

History
- Opened: 29 September 2025 (10 months ago)
- Former names: Creative Park (创意园)

Services
| Preceding station | Guangzhou Metro | Following station |
|---|---|---|
| Mawu towards Lejia Road | Line 14 | Helong towards Dongfeng |
Location

Hebian station (simplified Chinese: 鹤边站; traditional Chinese: 鶴邊站; pinyin: Hèbiān Zhàn; Cantonese Yale: Hókbīn Jaahm) is a station on Line 14 of the Guangzhou Metro. It is located on the northwest of the junction between Helong 1st Road and Helong 1st Cross Road in the Helong Subdistrict of Baiyun District in Guangzhou. It opened on 29 September 2025.

== Station Layout ==
=== Station Floorings ===
The station has two floors with a total construction area of approximately 23,000 square meters. The ground floor is the station entrance and exit, and is surrounded by Helong 1st Road, Yunkang Road, Helong 1st Cross Road and adjacent buildings. The first underground floor is the station concourse; the second underground floor is the Line 14 platform.

=== Concourse ===
The station concourse is equipped with ticket vending machines and an intelligent customer service center. To facilitate pedestrian access, the east side of the concourse is designated as a paid area. Within this area, dedicated elevators, escalators, and stairs provide easy access to the platforms.

=== Platforms ===
The station has an island platform located underground on Helong 1st Road. Toilets and a nursing room are located at the Helong end of the platform.

In addition, a pair of sidings is located at the north end of the platform.

=== Entrances/exits ===
The station has 3 points of entry/exit. Exit B is equipped with an elevator.

- A: Helong 1st Road, Yunkang Road, Helong 1st Cross Road
- B: Helong 1st Road, Helong 2nd Cross Road
- E: Helong 1st Road
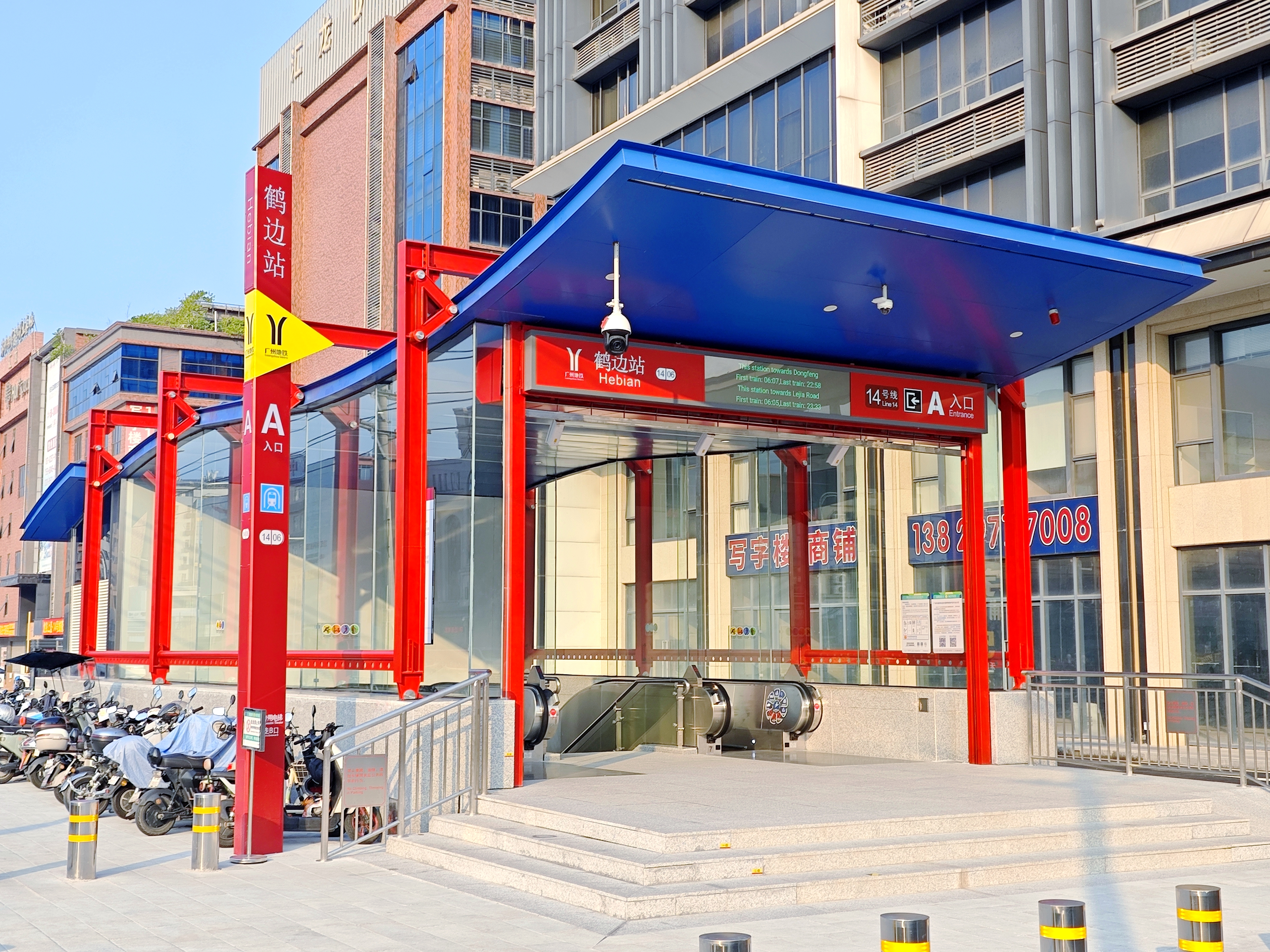
Entrance A

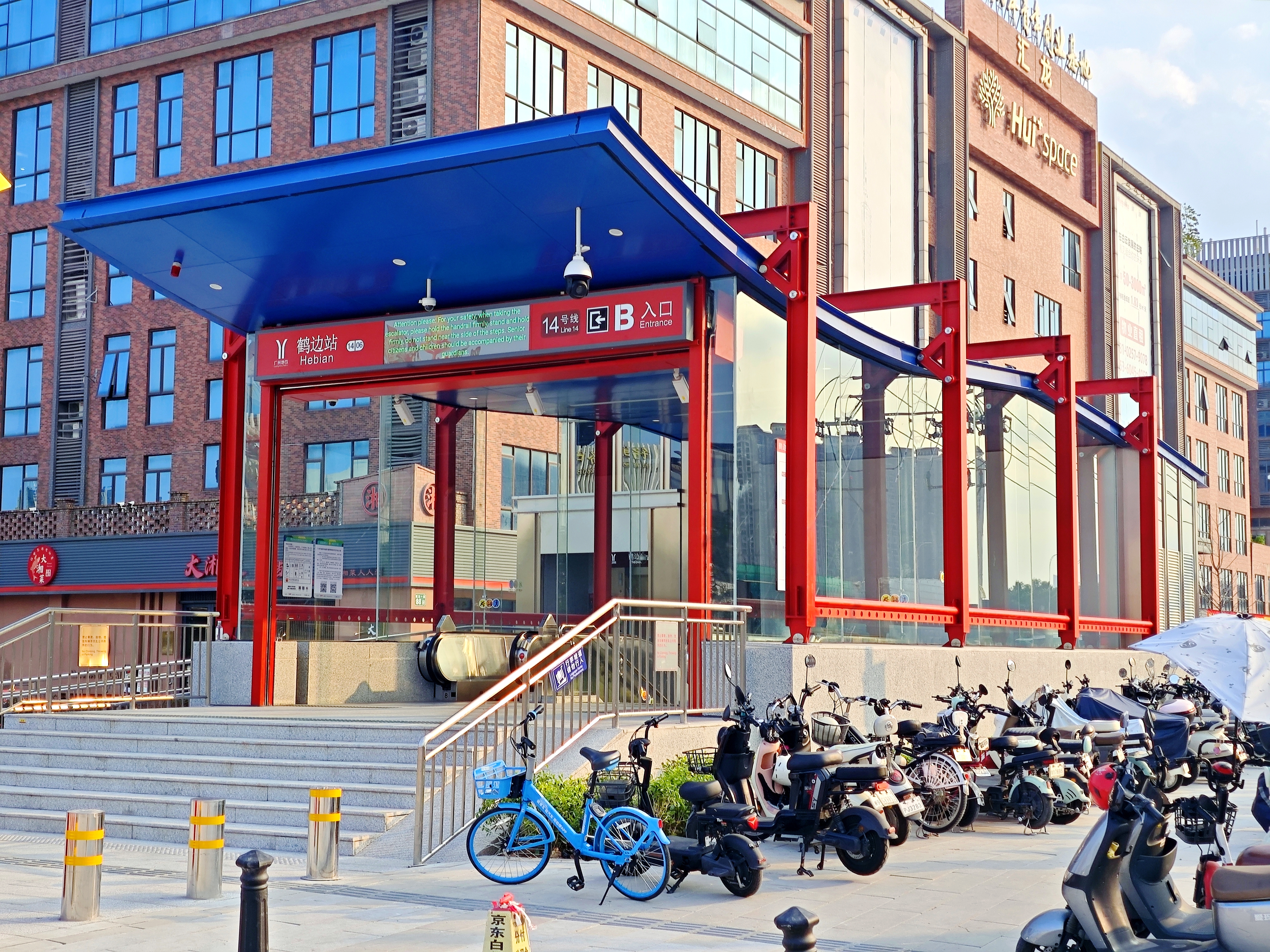
Entrance B

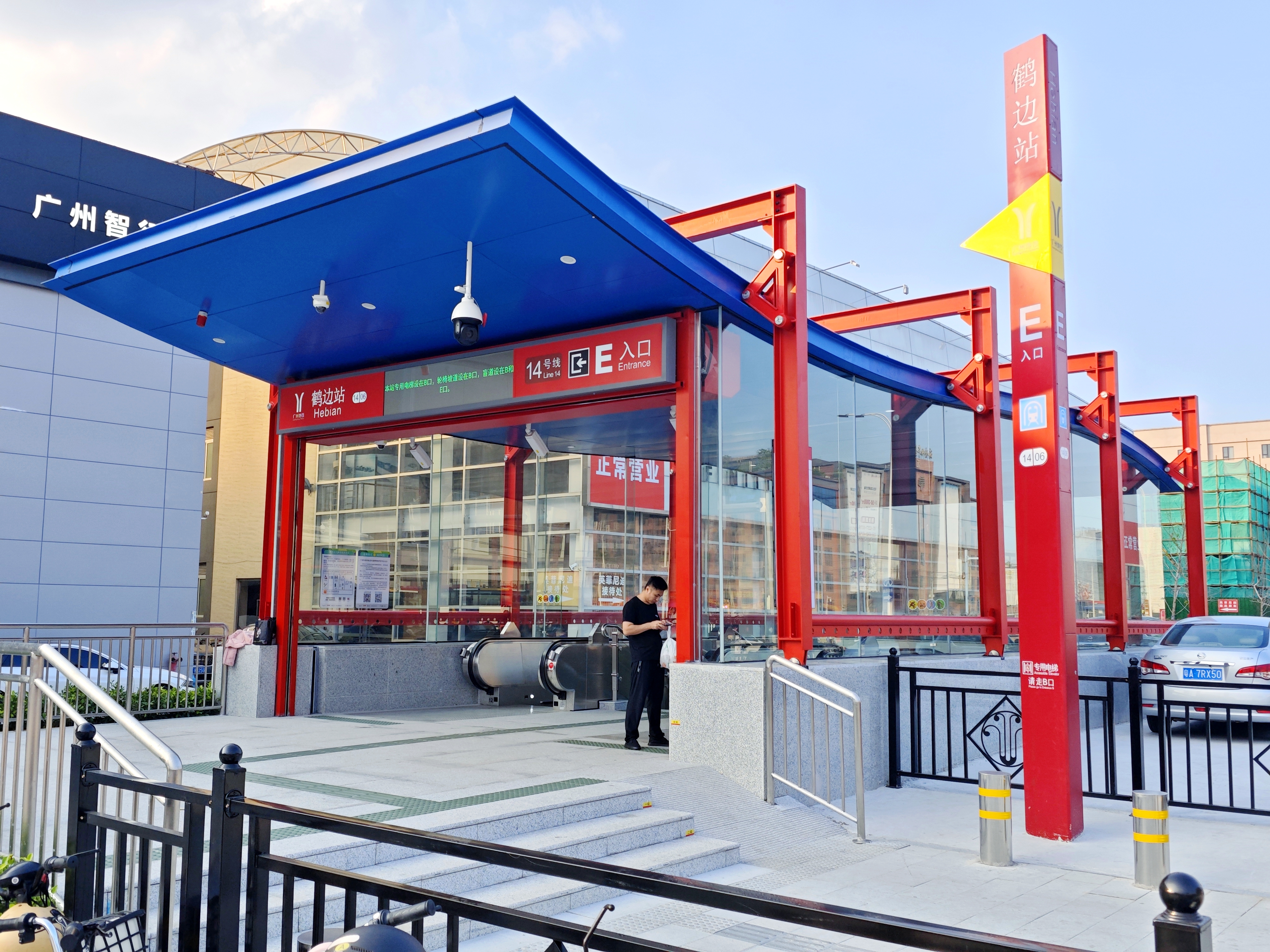
Entrance E

== Gallery ==
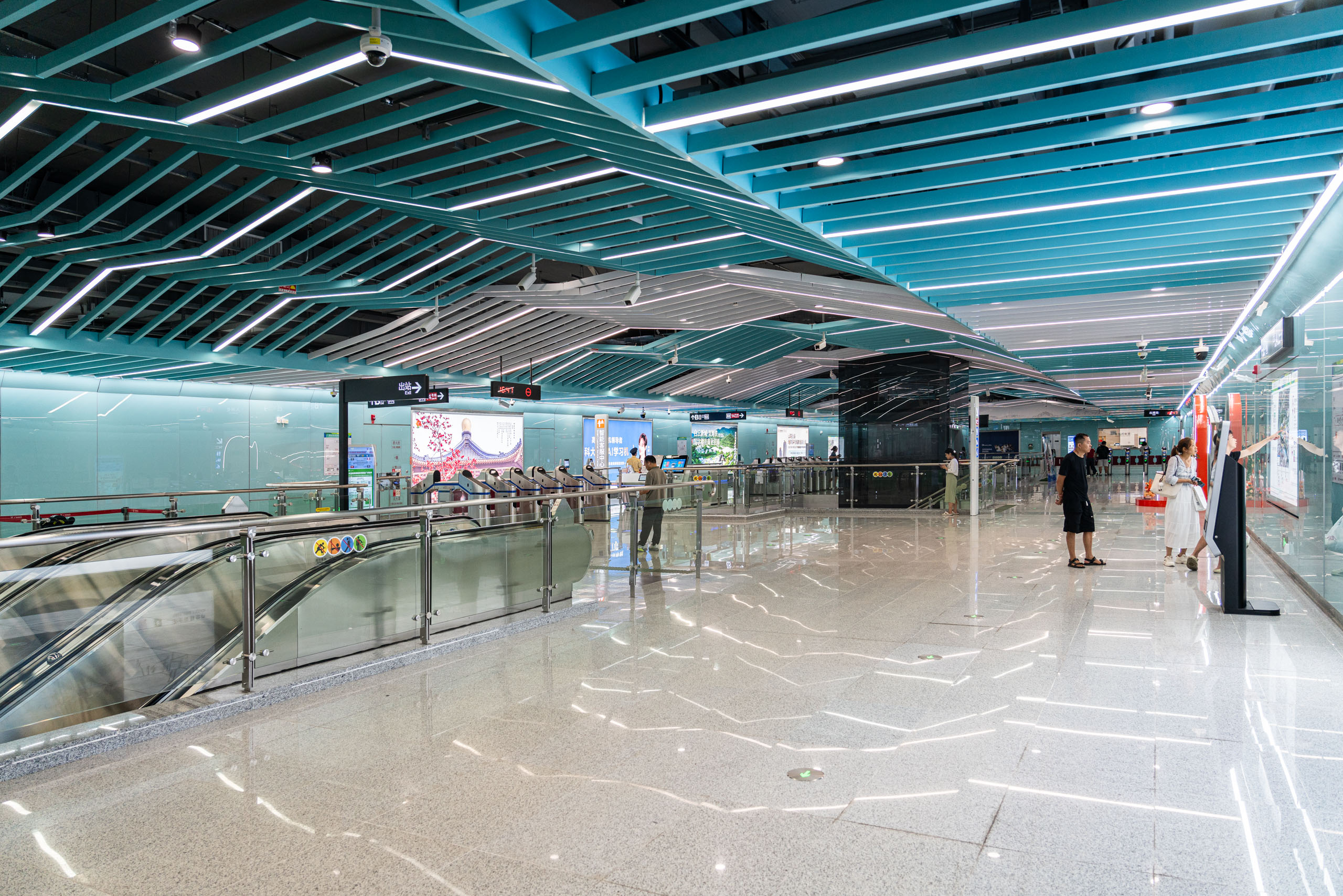
Concourse

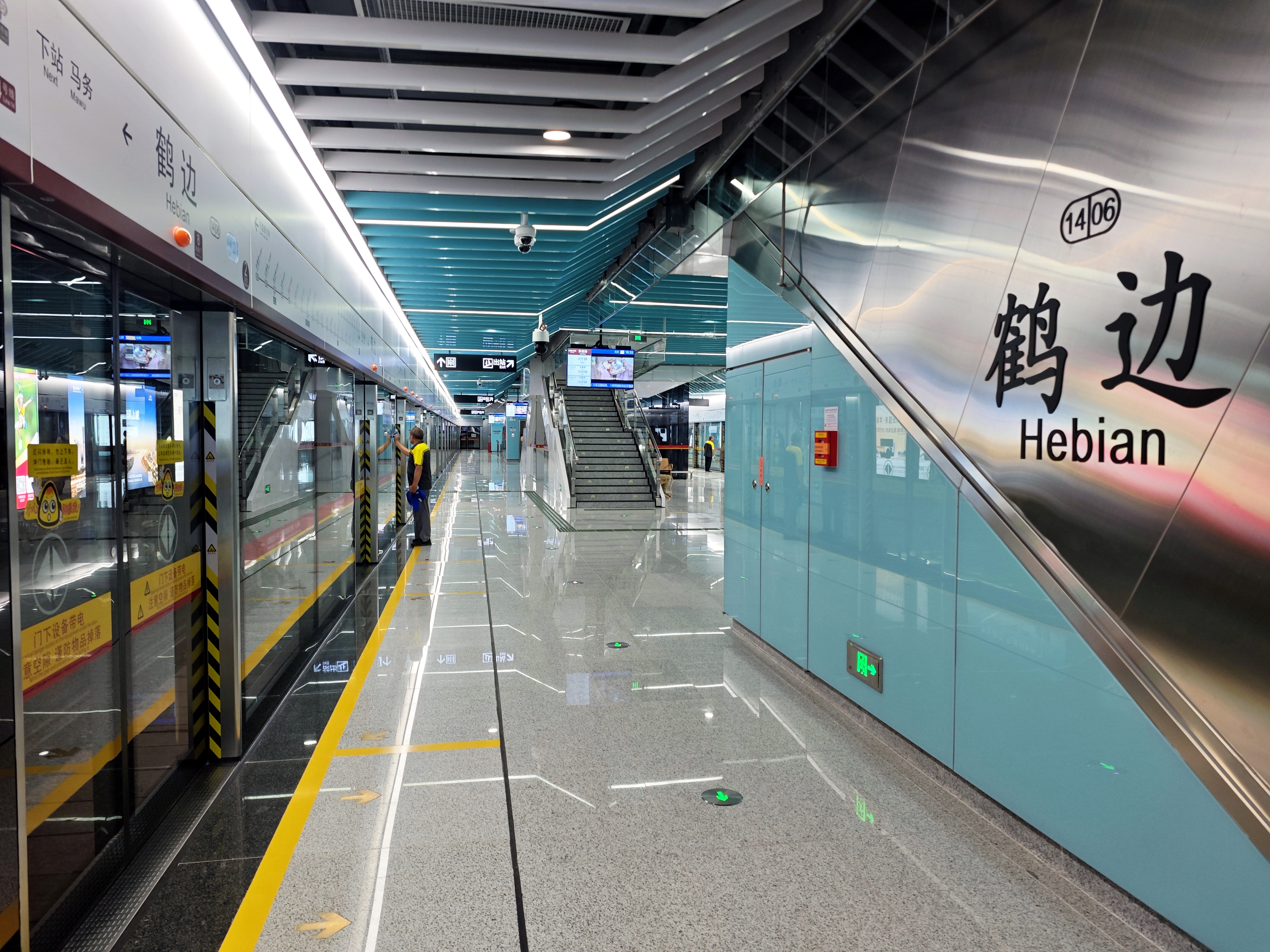
Platform 2

== History ==
The original plan for Line 14 Phase 2 did not include this station. It was later added to the south of the original Henan Station until the Phase 2 project of Line 14 was approved and construction was carried out. During this period, it was named Creative Park station. In July 2025, the Guangzhou Municipal Transportation Bureau announced the preliminary station names for Line 14 Phase 2. This station was proposed to be named Hebian station and was officially named in September 2025.

The main structure of the station was topped out in July 2022, and the station siding track was topped out in December 2022. In July 2025, the station completed the "three rights" transfer. On 29 September 2025, this station was put into operation.
