= Helong station =

Guangzhou Metro Line 14 station

Helong 鹤龙
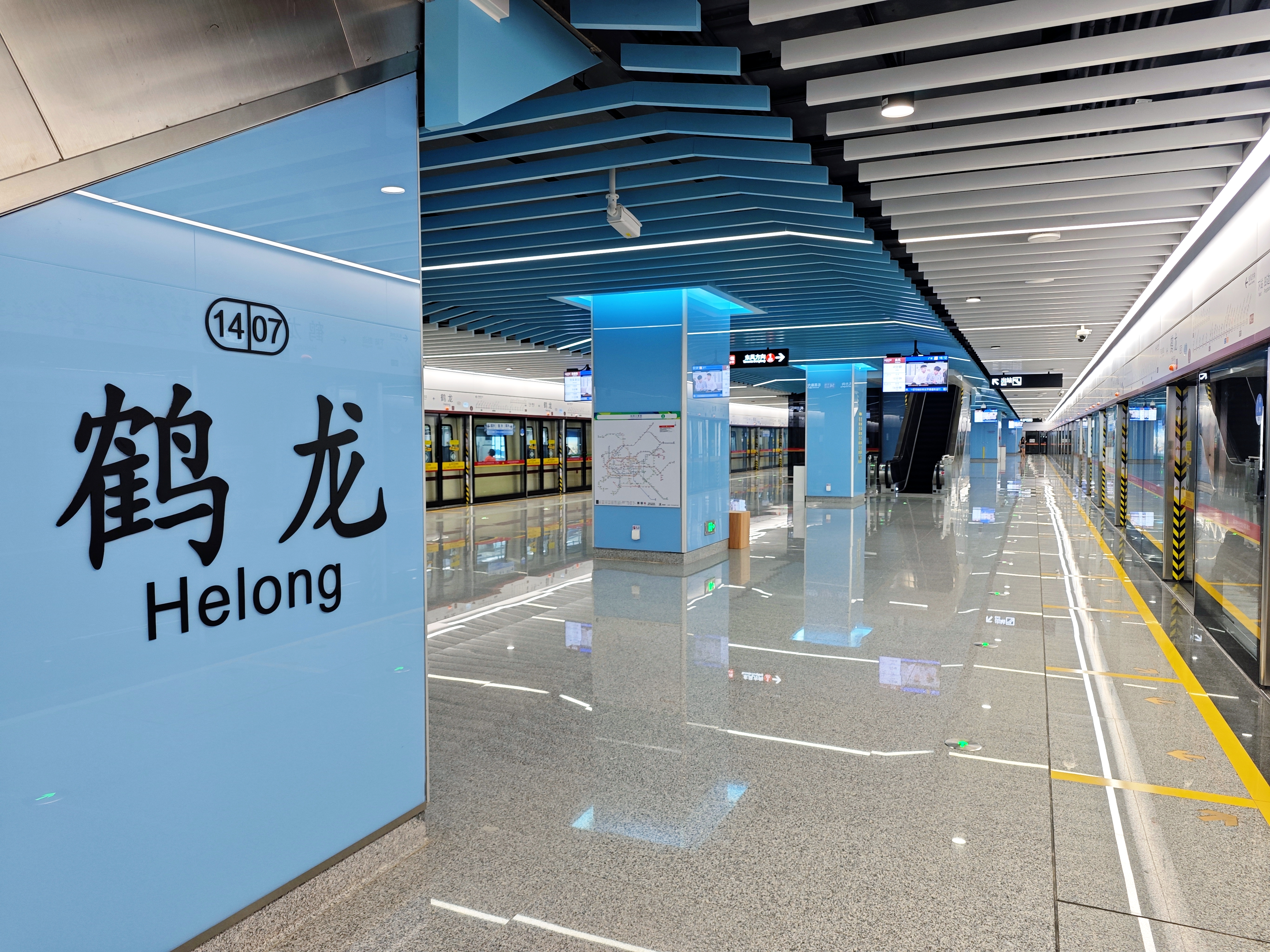
- Platform 2

Chinese name
- Simplified Chinese: 鹤龙站
- Traditional Chinese: 鶴龍站
Transcriptions
Standard Mandarin
- Hanyu Pinyin: HèLóng Zhàn
Yue: Cantonese
- Yale Romanization: Hóklǔng Jaahm
- Jyutping: hok6 lung4 zaam6

General information
- Location: Southwest of intersection between Helong 1st Road (鹤龙一路) and Hebian Junmin East Road (鹤边军民东路） Helong Subdistrict, Baiyun District, Guangzhou, Guangdong; China
- Coordinates: 23°13′31.01″N 113°16′0.23″E
- Operator: Guangzhou Metro Co. Ltd.
- Line: Line 14
- Platforms: 2 (1 island platform)
- Tracks: 2

Construction
- Structure type: Underground
- Accessible: Yes

Other information
- Station code: 1407

History
- Opened: 29 September 2025 (10 months ago)
- Former names: Henan (鹤南)

Services
| Preceding station | Guangzhou Metro | Following station |
|---|---|---|
| Hebian towards Lejia Road | Line 14 | Pengbian towards Dongfeng |
Location

Helong station (simplified Chinese: 鹤龙站; traditional Chinese: 鶴龍站; pinyin: Hèlóng Zhàn; Cantonese Yale: Hóklǔng Jaahm) is a station on Line 14 of the Guangzhou Metro. It is located on the southwest of the junction between Helong 1st Road and Hebian Junmin East Road, on the west side of the planned Guangzhou Design City West Expansion Area, in the Helong Subdistrict of Baiyun District in Guangzhou. It opened on 29 September 2025.

== Station Layout ==
=== Station Floorings ===
The station is three stories long and 155 metres (509 ft) long, with a standard excavation depth of 24.13 metres (79.2 ft). The ground level houses the station entrances and exits, and is surrounded by Helong 1st Road, Hebian Junmin East Road, and adjacent buildings. The first underground level houses the station concourse, the second underground level houses the station equipment floor, and the third underground level houses the Line 14 platform.

=== Concourse ===
The station concourse has an automatic ticket vending machine and an intelligent customer service center. To facilitate pedestrian entry and exit, the east side of the concourse is divided into a paid area and unpaid area. There are special elevators, multiple escalators and stairs in the paid area to facilitate passengers to access the platform.

=== Platforms ===
This site has an island-style platform located underground on Helong Road. The toilets and nursing room are located at the end of the platform towards Hebian.

=== Entrances/exits ===
The station has 2 points of entry/exit. Exit C is equipped with an elevator.

- C: Helong 1st Road, Junmin East Road
- D: Helong 1st Road, Guangdong Provincial Anti-Drug Science Museum
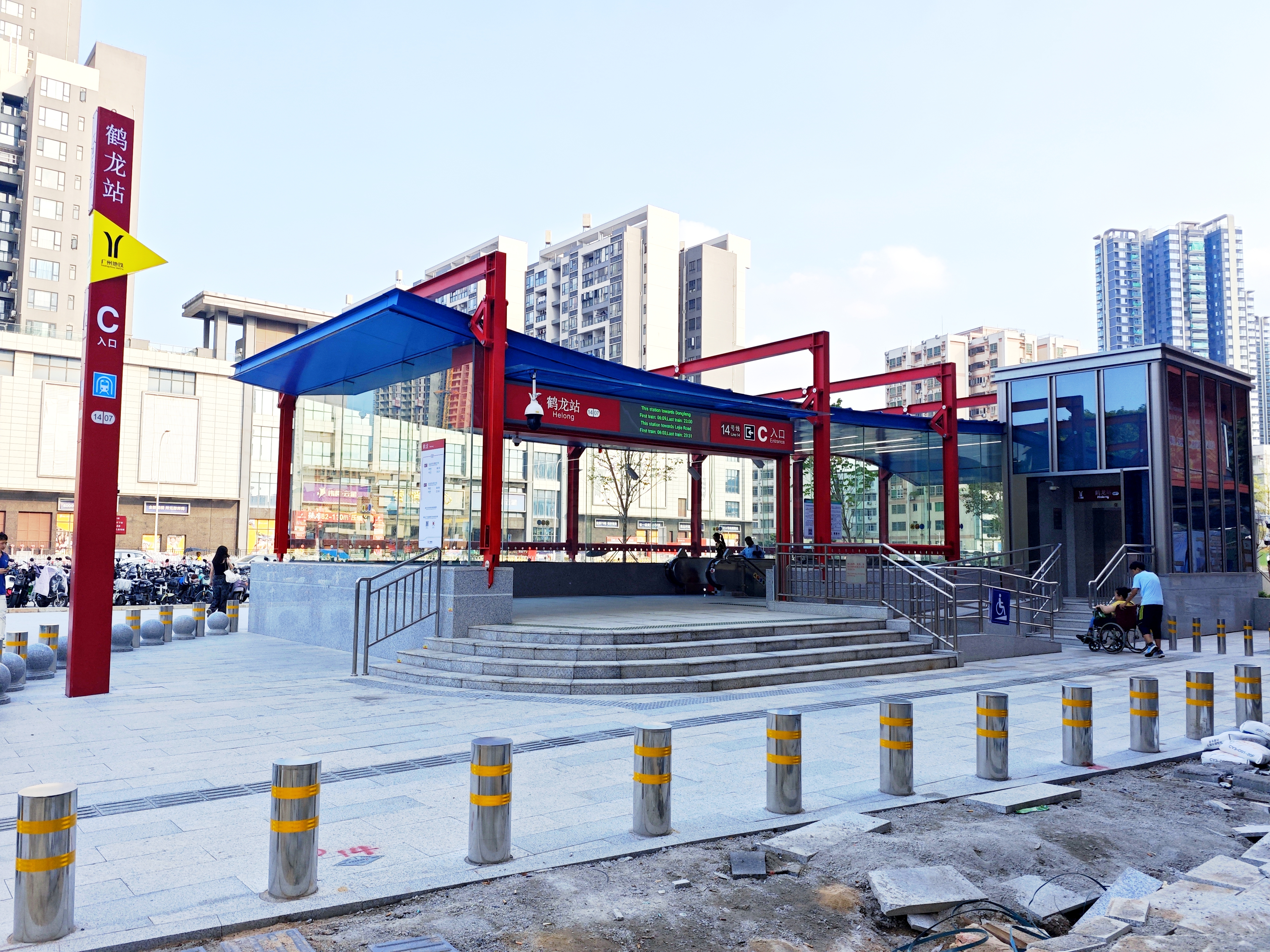
Entrance C

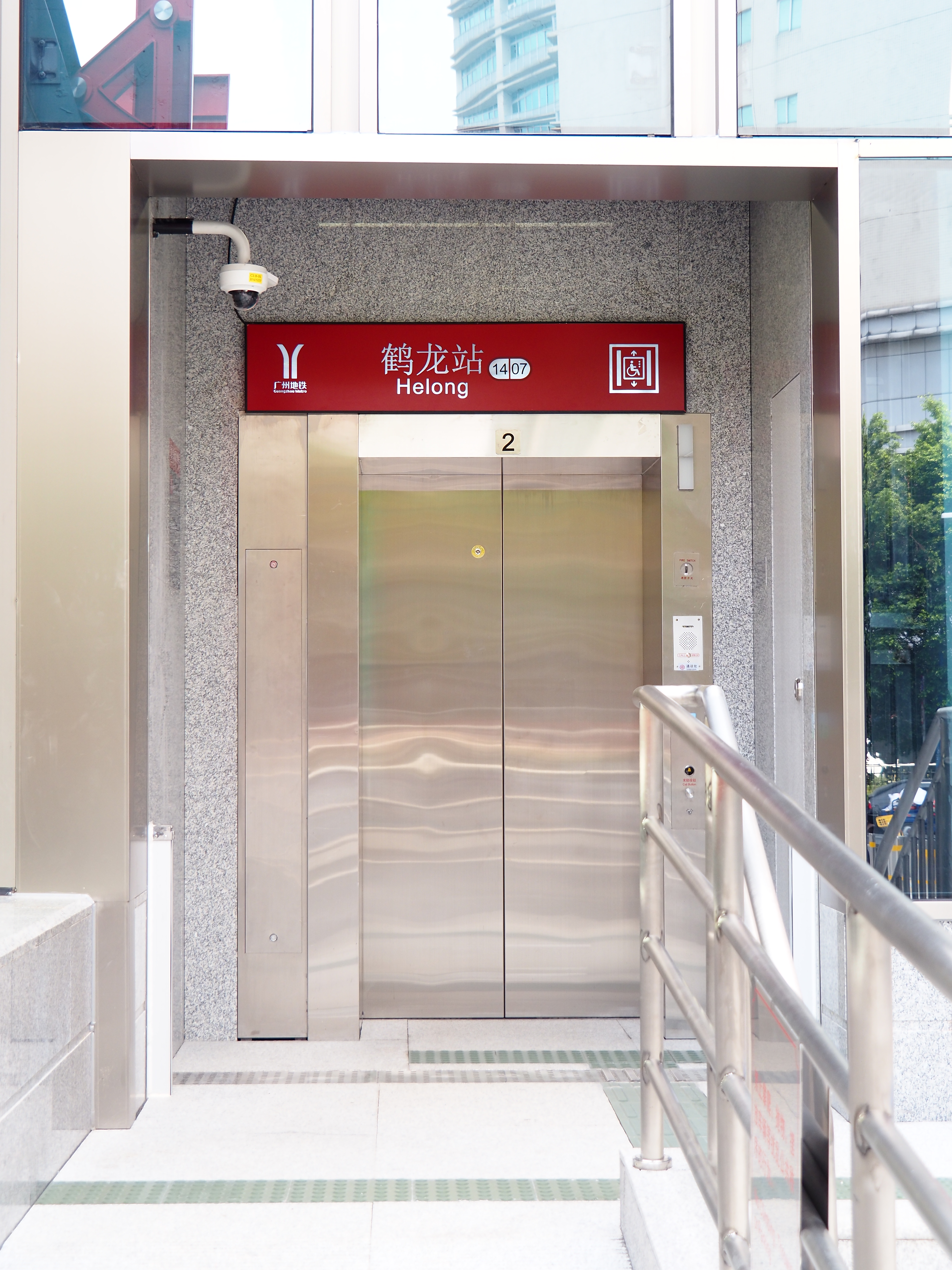
Elevator of Entrance C

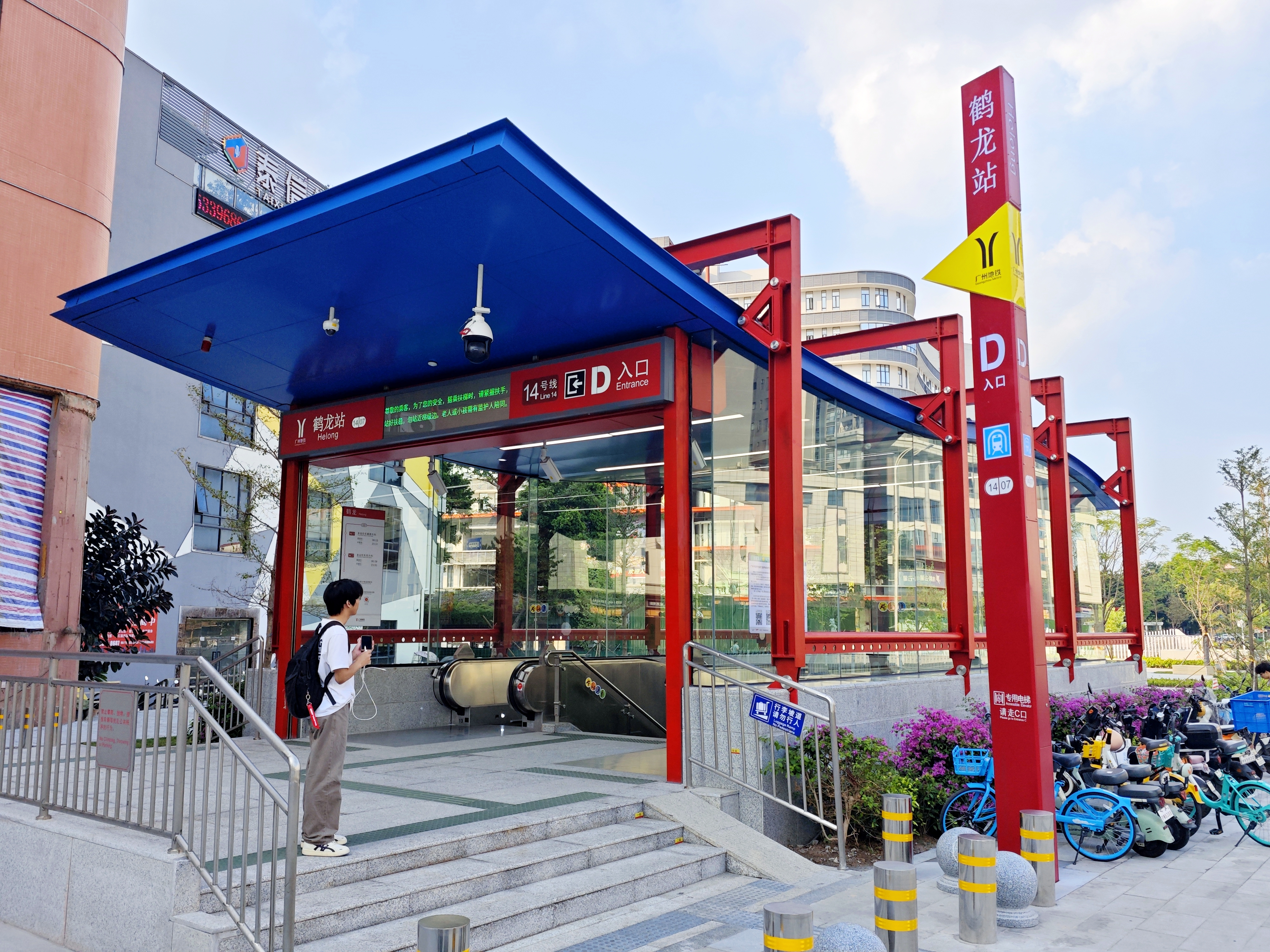
Entrance D

== Gallery ==
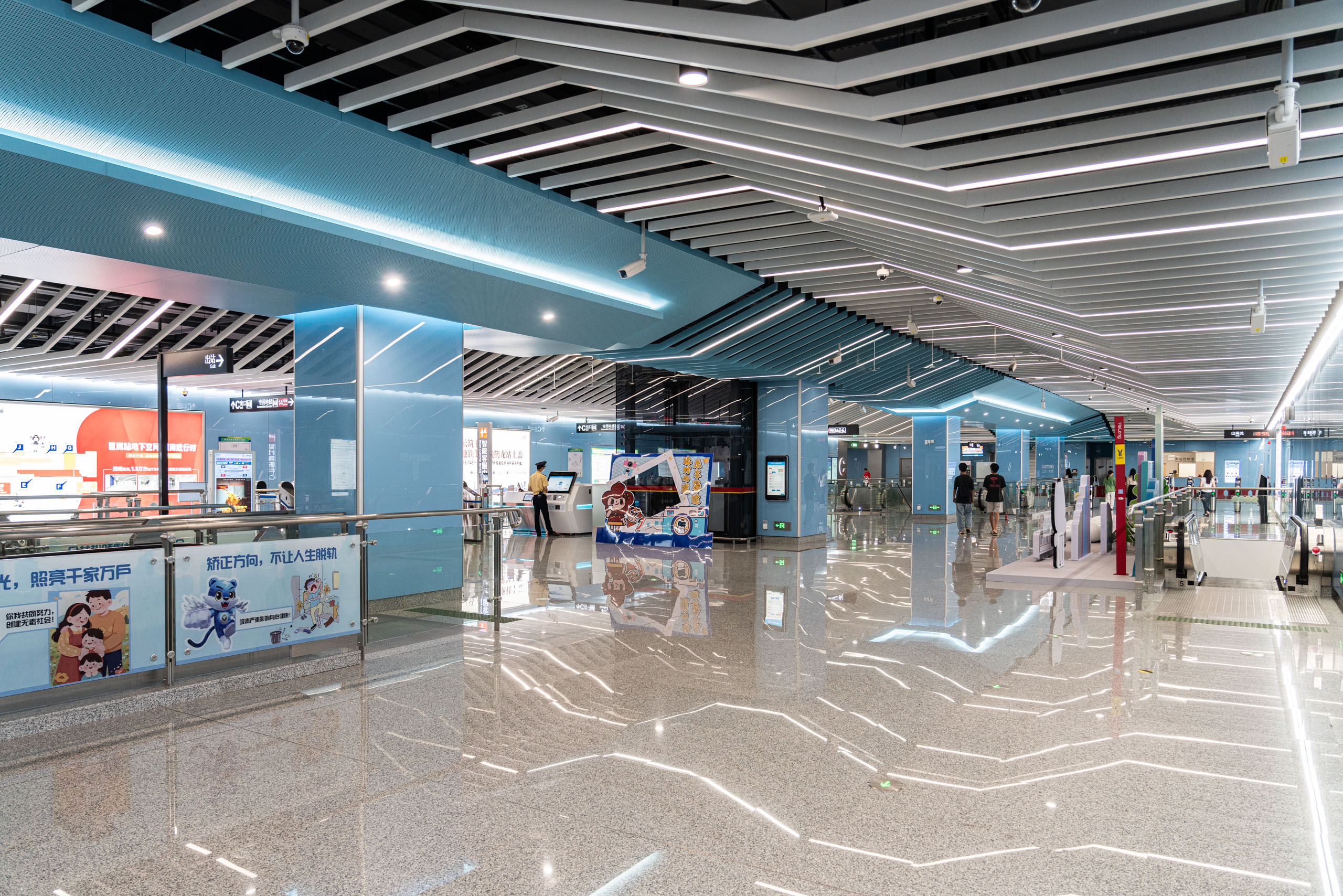
Concourse

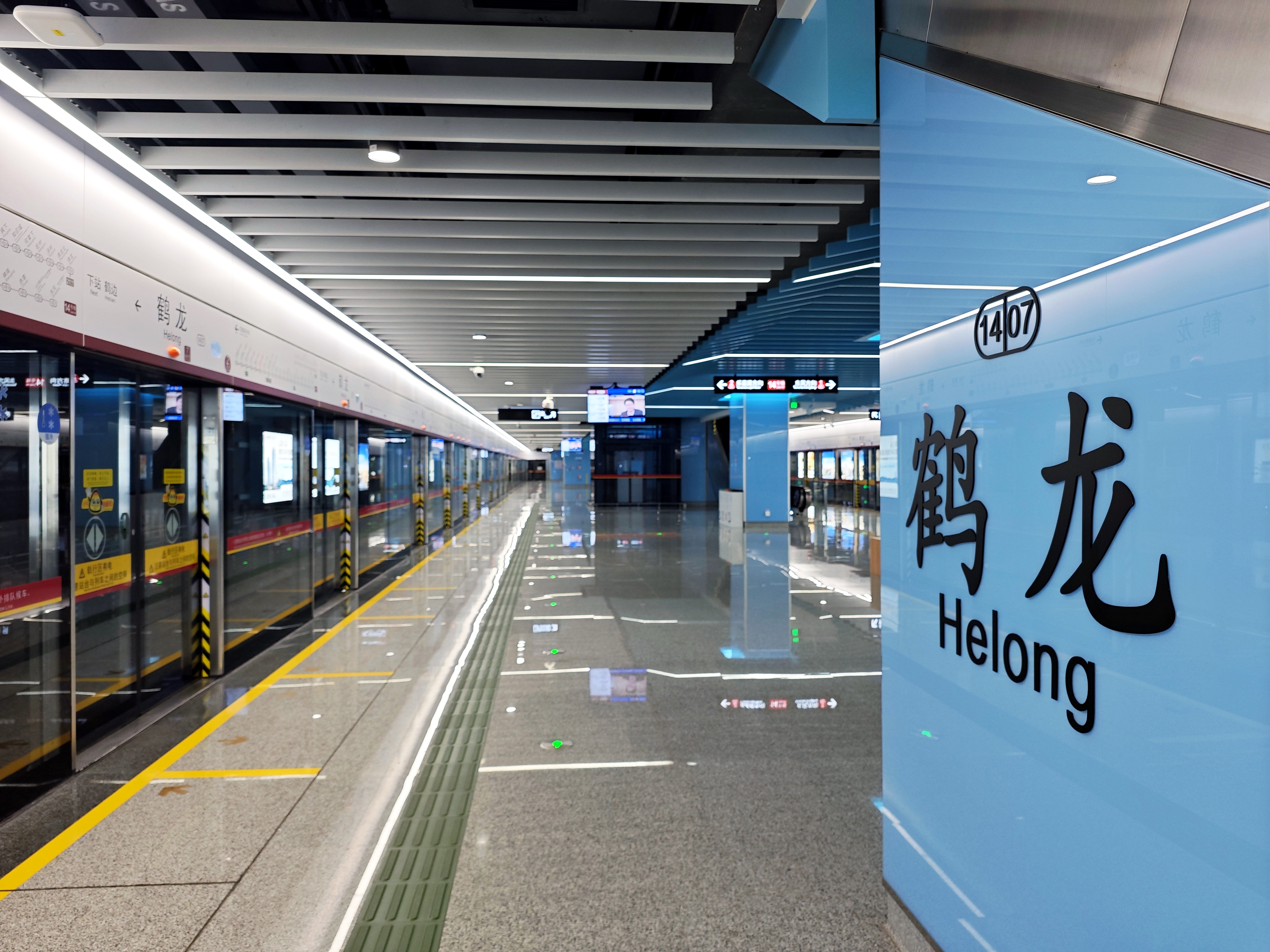
Platform 2

== History ==
During planning and construction, this station was named Henan station. In July 2025, the Guangzhou Municipal Transportation Bureau announced the preliminary station names for the second phase of Line 14. This station was proposed to be named Helong station, and the name was officially confirmed in September 2025.

Construction of the station began on 28 January 2019. Construction of the retaining structure began in May 2020, and the main structure topped out on 5 April 2022. The station opened for operation on 29 September 2025.
