= Jiaohe =

Jiaohe may refer to the following locations in China:

- Jiaohe, Jilin (蛟河市), county-level city of Jilin City
- Jiaohe ruins (交河故城), archaeological site near Turpan, Xinjiang
- Jiao River (Shandong) (胶河), or Jiao He, river in Shandong
- Jiaohe, Botou, Hebei (交河镇), town in Botou, Hebei

== See also ==
- Jiahe (disambiguation)
