= Tonghe Subdistrict, Guangzhou =

Tonghe Subdistrict 同和街道
- Subdistrict
- Location in Guangdong
- Coordinates: 23°11′54″N 113°19′15″E
- Country: People's Republic of China
- Province: Guangdong
- Prefecture-level city: Guangzhou
- District: Baiyun District
- Time zone: UTC+8 (China Standard)

Tonghe Subdistrict (Chinese: 同和街道; pinyin: Tónghé Jiēdào) is a subdistrict in Baiyun District, Guangzhou, Guangdong province, China. As of 2020, it has 16 residential communities under its administration:

- Woshan Community (握山社区)
- Baishan Community (白山社区)
- Baiyunshan Pharmaceutical Company Community (白云山制药厂社区)
- Chanchushi Community (蟾蜍石社区)
- Baishuitang Community (白水塘社区)
- Xieshan Community (蟹山社区)
- Shiqiaotou Community (石桥头社区)
- Rongshutou Community (榕树头社区)
- Jinhu Community (金湖社区)
- Hewu Community (何屋社区)
- Yilüshanzhuang Community (倚绿山庄社区)
- Siwenjing Community (斯文井社区)
- Fuhehuayuan Community (富和花园社区)
- Yunxiang Community (云祥社区)
- Laozhuang Community (老庄社区)
- Xinzhuang Community (新庄社区)
- Dabei Community (大陂社区)
- Nanhubandao Community (南湖半岛社区)

== See also ==
- List of township-level divisions of Guangdong
