= Renhe, Guangdong =

Renhe 人和镇
- Town
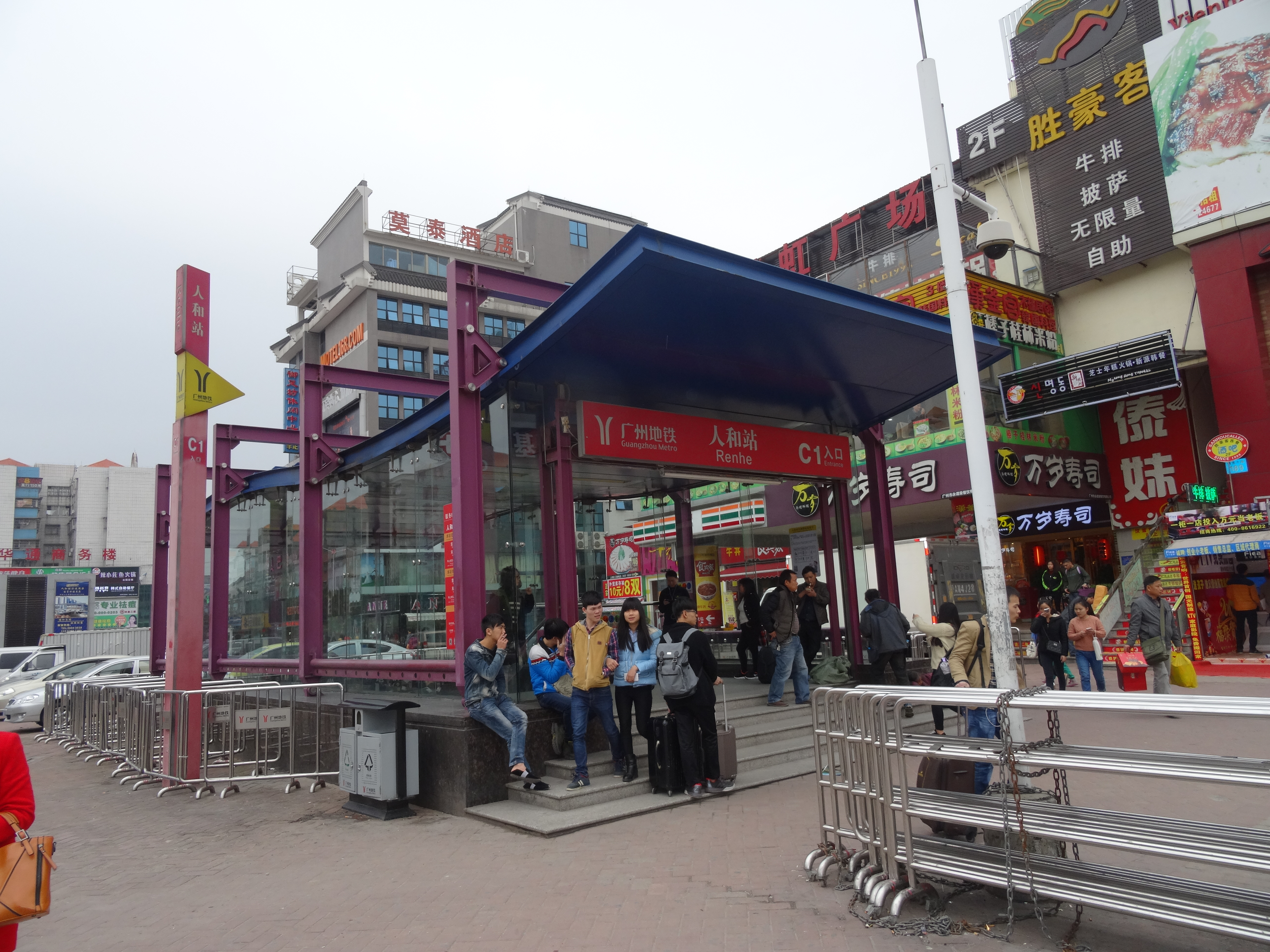
- A street view of Renhe Station

- Location within Guangdong
- Coordinates: 23°19′56″N 113°17′45″E
- Country: China
- Province: Guangdong
- Sub-provincial City: Guangzhou
- District: Baiyun District

Area
  - Total: 74.1 km^{2} (28.6 sq mi)

Population (2010)
  - Total: 127,795
  - Density: 1,720/km^{2} (4,470/sq mi)
- Time zone: UTC+8 (China Standard Time)

Renhe (simplified Chinese: 人和镇; traditional Chinese: 人和鎮; pinyin: Rénhé Zhèn) is a town in Baiyun District, Guangzhou, Guangdong, China. The town spans an area of 74.1 square kilometres (28.6 mi^{2}), and has a population of 127,795 per the 2010 Chinese Census.

== History ==
In July 2002, the now-defunct town of Banghu was merged into Renhe.

== Geography ==
Renhe is located approximately 20 kilometres (12 mi) from downtown Guangzhou, and is bordered by Xinhua Subdistrict and Huadong in Huadu District to its north.

The Liuxi River flows through Renhe.

== Administrative divisions ==
Renhe administers 3 residential communities and 25 administrative villages.

=== Residential communities ===
Renhe contains the following 3 residential communities:

- Renhe Community (Chinese: 人和社区)
- Banghu Community (Chinese: 蚌湖社区)
- Suihe Community (Chinese: 穗和社区)

=== Administrative villages ===
Renhe contains the following 25 administrative villages:

- Donghua Village (Chinese: 东华村)
- Hantang Village (Chinese: 汉塘村)
- Xinxing Village (Chinese: 新兴村)
- Mingxing Village (Chinese: 明星村)
- Minqiang Village (Chinese: 民强村)
- Gaozeng Village (Chinese: 高增村)
- Renhe Village (Chinese: 人和村)
- Xicheng Village (Chinese: 西成村)
- Aigang Village (Chinese: 矮岗村)
- Fenghe Village (Chinese: 凤和村)
- Hengli Village (Chinese: 横沥村)
- Gangwei Village (Chinese: 岗尾村)
- Fangshi Village (Chinese: 方石村)
- Daxiang Village (Chinese: 大巷村)
- Taicheng Village (Chinese: 太成村)
- Yahu Village (Chinese: 鸦湖村)
- Xiushui Village (Chinese: 秀水村)
- Heting Village (Chinese: 鹤亭村)
- Huangbangling Village (Chinese: 黄榜岭村)
- Xinlian Village (Chinese: 新联村)
- Zhenhu Village (Chinese: 镇湖村)
- Qinghe Village (Chinese: 清河村)
- Nanfang Village (Chinese: 南方村)
- Xihu Village (Chinese: 西湖村)
- Jiannan Village (Chinese: 建南村)

== Demographics ==
Per the 2010 Chinese Census, Renhe has a population of 127,795. Prior to the incorporation of the former town of Banghu, which had a population of 26,954 according to the 2000 Chinese Census, Renhe had a population of 85,300 as of 2000.

About 76,000 overseas Chinese hail from Renhe, including those living in Hong Kong, Macau, and Taiwan.

== Education ==
The town is home to 1 secondary school, 5 middle schools, 11 primary schools, and 2 adult schools.

== Transportation ==
Guangzhou Baiyun International Airport is partially located in the northern portion of Renhe.

A number of major expressways pass through Renhe, including China National Highway 106, the Guangzhou Airport Expressway, and the Guangzhou North Second Ring Expressway.
