= Guangzhou Nanfang International School =

International school in China

- Simplified Chinese: 广州南方国际学校
- Traditional Chinese: 廣州南方國際學校
Transcriptions
Standard Mandarin
- Hanyu Pinyin: Guǎngzhōu Nánfāng Guójì Xuéxiào
Yue: Cantonese
- Jyutping: gwong2 zau1 naam4 fong1 gwok3 zai3 hok6 haau6

Guangzhou Nanfang International School (GNIS; simplified Chinese: 广州南方国际学校; traditional Chinese: 廣州南方國際學校; pinyin: Guǎngzhōu Nánfāng Guójì Xuéxiào; lit. 'Southern Guangzhou International School') is an international school on the property of the South Industrial Park, (Note: 工业园南; 工業園南; Gōngyèyuánnán; gung1 jip6 jyun4 naam4) in Longdong Subdistrict (Note: 龙洞; 龍洞; Lóngdòng; lung4 dung2), Tianhe District, Guangzhou. The school serves students ages 2.5 to 17, from early childhood to secondary school.

The school admits non-Mainland Chinese foreign students. Only Mainland Chinese students who have permanent residency in a country other than Mainland China are eligible to attend.

== History ==
The school opened in 2003 as the Guangzhou Nanhu International School (Note: 广州南湖国际学校; 廣州南湖國際學校; Guǎngzhōu Nánhú Guójì Xuéxiào; gwong2 zau1 naam4 wu4 gwok3 zai3 hok6 haau6) ("Guangzhou South Lake International School").

Originally it was located in Baiyun District. In July 2005, it moved into a facility in central Tianhe, located in The Greenery. (Note: 怡苑; Yíyuàn; yi4 jyun2) In 2014 the school moved into its current campus in Longdong Subdistrict and changed its name to its current one.
