= Renhe station (Guangzhou Metro) =

Guangzhou Metro station

Renhe 人和
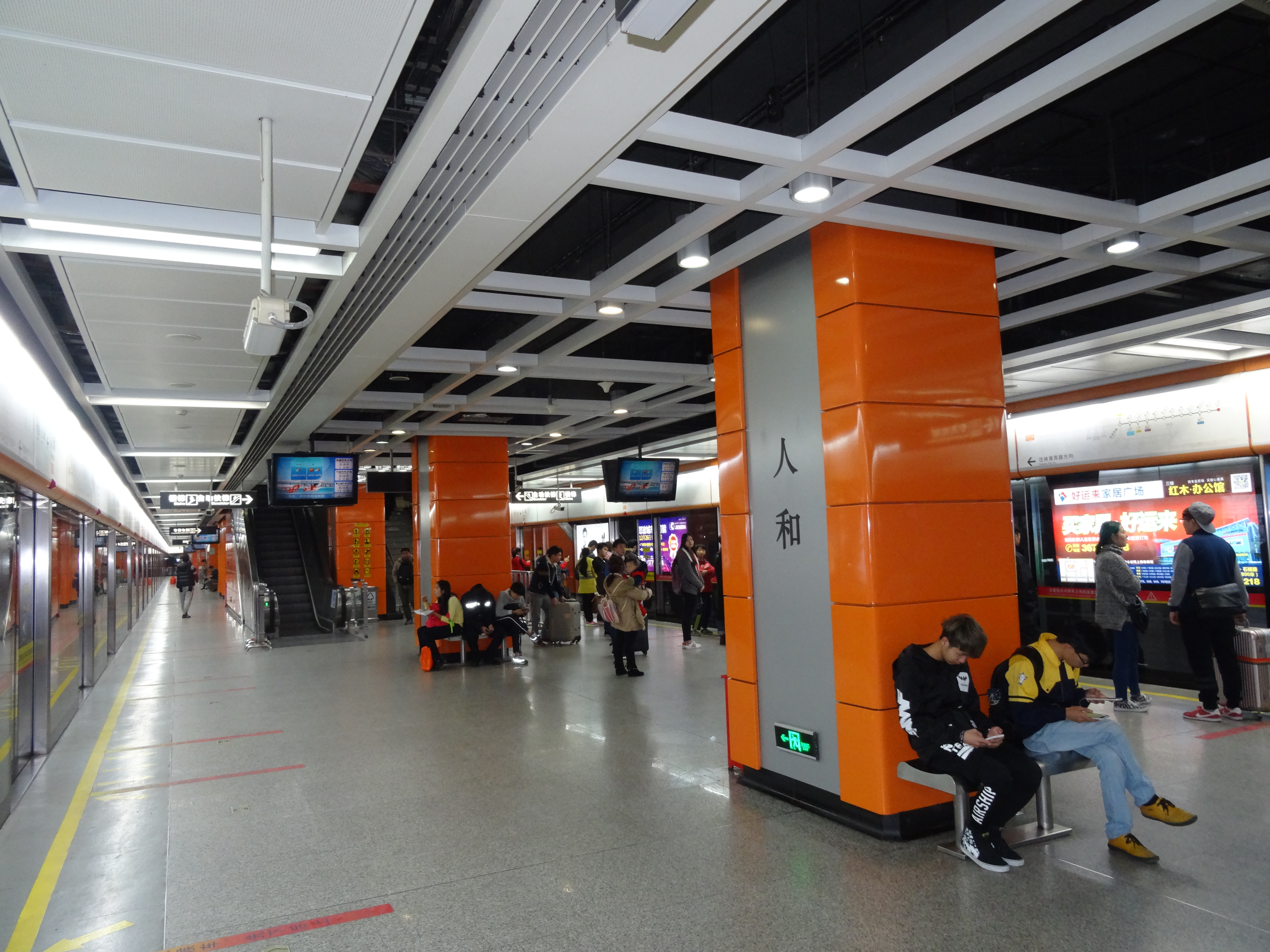
- Platform of Renhe

Chinese name
- Chinese: 人和站
Transcriptions
Standard Mandarin
- Hanyu Pinyin: Rénhé Zhàn
Yue: Cantonese
- Yale Romanization: Yàhnwòh Jaahm
- Jyutping: Jan^{4}wo^{4} Zaam^{6}
- Hong Kong Romanization: Yan Wo station

General information
- Location: east of the intersection of China National Highway 106 (Renhe section) and Fanghua Highway (方华公路); Renhe, Baiyun District, Guangzhou, Guangdong; China
- Operated by: Guangzhou Metro Co. Ltd.
- Line: Line 3
- Platforms: 2 (1 island platform)

Construction
- Structure type: Underground

Other information
- Station code: 327

History
- Opened: 30 October 2010; 15 years ago

Services
Preceding station	Guangzhou Metro	Following station
Longgui towards Haibang	Line 3	Gaozeng towards Airport North (Terminal 2)
Location

Renhe Station (Chinese: 人和站; Cantonese Yale: Yàhnwòh Jaahm) is a metro station on Line 3 of the Guangzhou Metro. The station is located under China National Highway 106 (Renhe Section) in Renhe Town (人和镇), Baiyun District. It started operation on 30 October 2010.
