= Nengren Temple (Guangzhou) =

Buddhist temple in Guangzhou, China

- 能仁寺
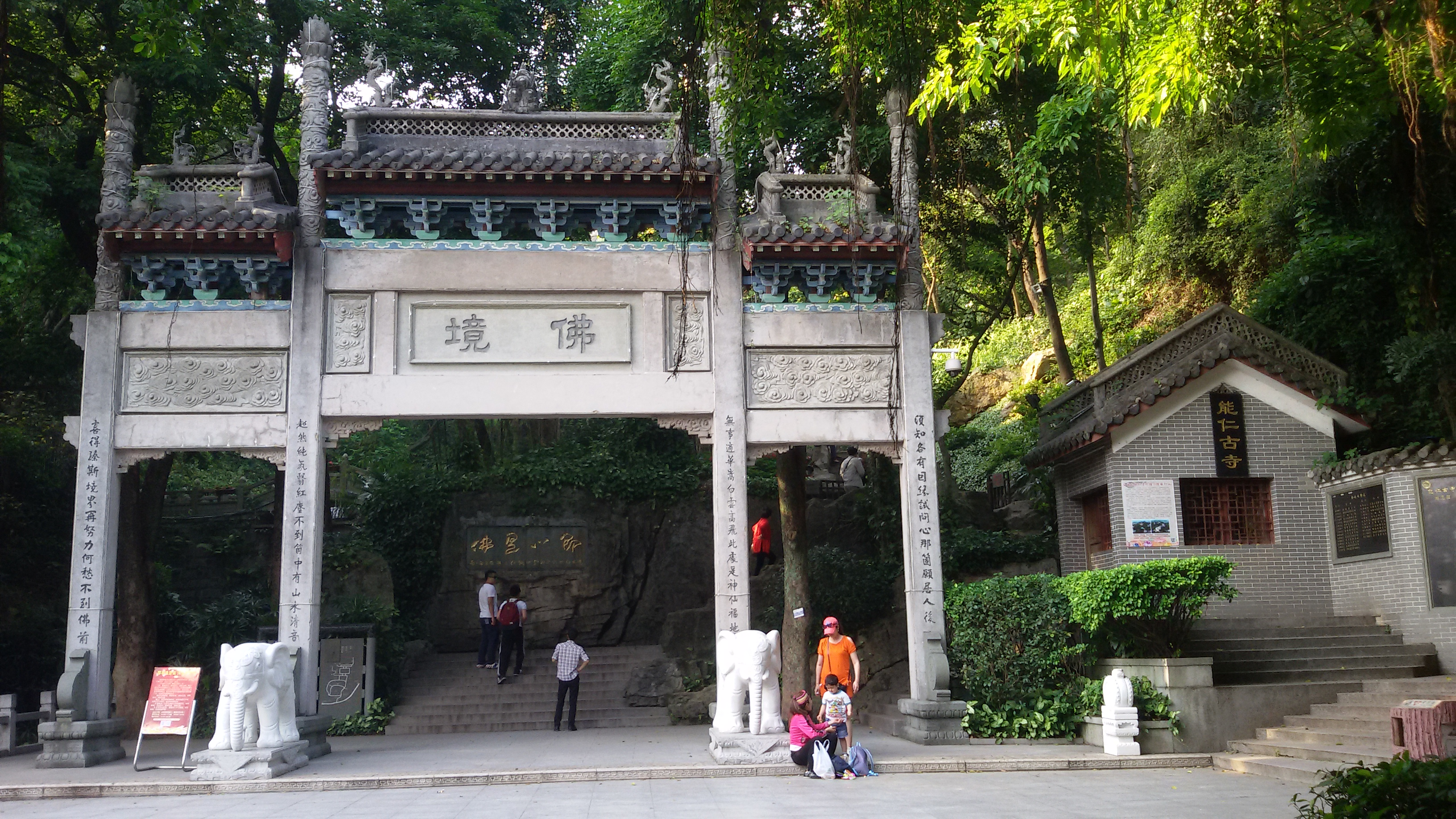
- The paifang at Nengren Temple.

- Location within Guangdong Location within China

Religion
- Affiliation: Buddhism
- Deity: Chan Buddhism
- Leadership: Yaozhi (耀智)

Location
- Location: Mount Baiyun, Baiyun District, Guangzhou, Guangdong
- Country: China
- Interactive map of Nengren Temple
- Coordinates: 23°10′29″N 113°18′24″E

Architecture
- Style: Chinese architecture
- Founder: Yinjian (吟坚)
- Established: 1824

Nengren Temple (Chinese: 能仁寺; pinyin: Néngrén Sì) is a Buddhist temple located on Mount Baiyun, in Baiyun District of Guangzhou, Guangdong, China.

== History ==
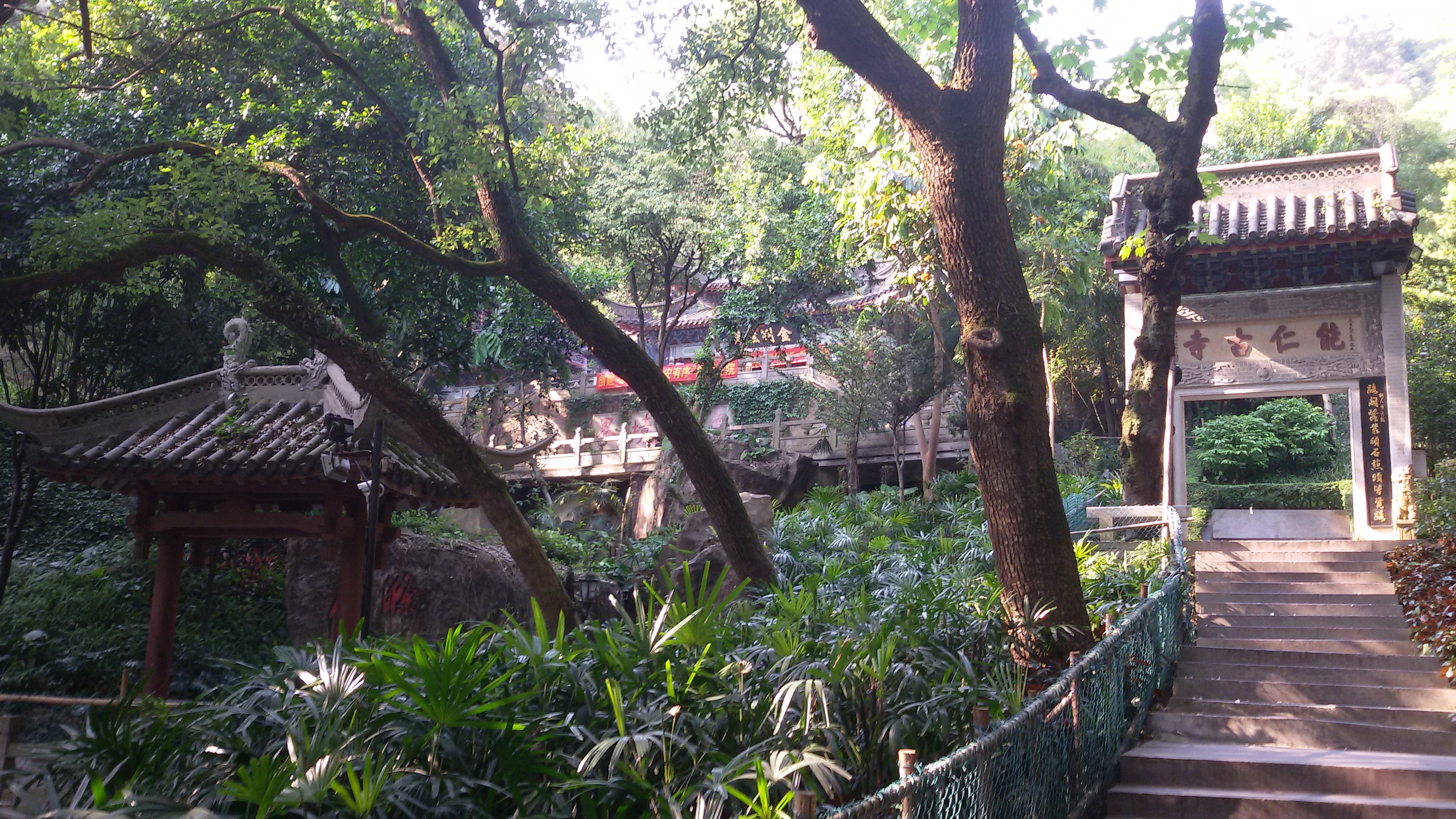
Nengren Temple.

Nengren temple was first established by Yinjian (吟坚) in 1824, during the reign of Daoguang Emperor (1821–1850) of the Qing dynasty (1644–1911). The buildings of Nengren Temple that still remain were being restored and preserved until in 1908, when the temple had reached unprecedented heyday and became the largest Buddhist temple on Mount Baiyun.

On May 17, 1924, Sun Yat-sen and his wife Song Qingling visited Nengren Temple.

In 1966, a Japanese youth delegation came to Nengren Temple to plant a group of Cinnamomum camphora named "China-Japan Youth Friendship Forest".

In 1993, the Guangzhou Municipal Government has allocated CN¥15 million (US$2.383 million) for the reconstruction project. Then Nengren Temple was officially reopened to the public in May 1995.

== Architecture ==
Nengren Temple is built along the up and down of mountains. Now the existing main buildings include the Paifang, Shanmen, Mahavira Hall, Ciyun Hall (慈云殿), Kṣitigarbha Hall, Sanmodi (三摩地), Wuchendi (无尘地), Sixth Patriarch Hall, Baoyue Pavilion (宝月阁), Guru Hall, Drum Tower, Bell Tower, Dining Hall, Reception Hall, etc.
