= Longgui Subdistrict =

Longgui Subdistrict 龙归街道
- Subdistrict
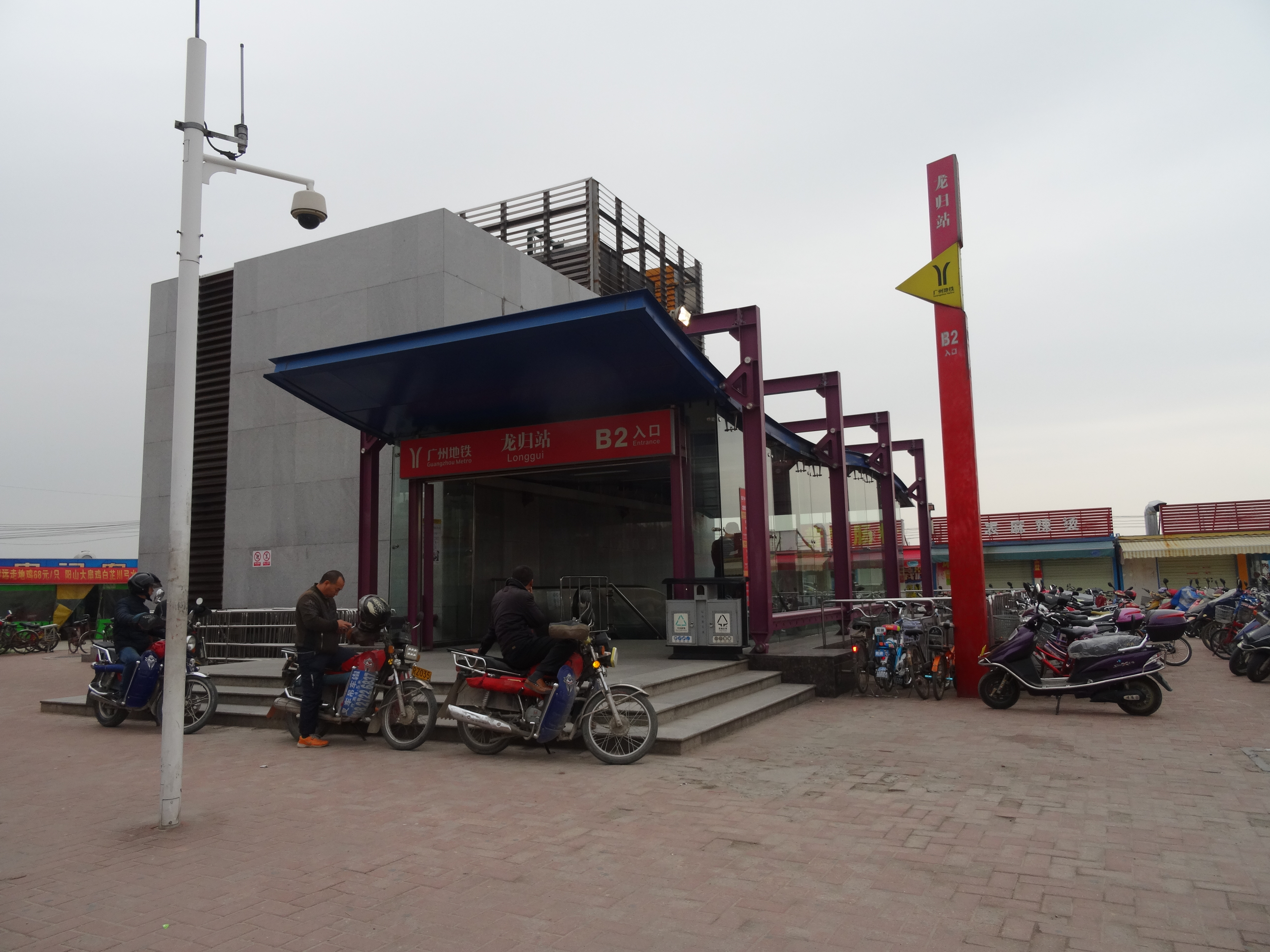
- One of Longgui station's exits

- Location in Guangdong
- Coordinates: 23°16′45″N 113°18′43″E
- Country: People's Republic of China
- Province: Guangdong
- Prefecture-level city: Guangzhou
- District: Baiyun District
- Time zone: UTC+8 (China Standard)

Longgui Subdistrict (simplified Chinese: 龙归街道; traditional Chinese: 龍歸街道; pinyin: Lóngguī Jiēdào; Jyutping: Lung^{4}-gwai^{1} Gaai^{1}-dou^{6}) is a subdistrict in Baiyun District, Guangzhou, Guangdong, China. As of 2023, it administers seven residential communities and seven villages:

- Longgui Community
- Longyue Community (龙悦社区)
- Longsui Community (龙穗社区)
- Huiya Community (汇雅社区)
- Donghuyingyue Community (东湖映月社区)
- Jinlong Community (金龙社区)
- Long'an Community (龙安社区)
- Yongxing Village (永兴村)
- Nan Village (南村)
- Nanling Village (南岭村)
- Yuanxia Village (园夏村)
- Xialiang Village (夏良村)
- Baitang Village (柏塘村)
- Bei Village (北村)

== See also ==
- List of township-level divisions of Guangdong
