= Alcanta International College =

Private secondary school in Guangzhou, China

- Simplified Chinese: 广州亚加达国际预科
- Traditional Chinese: 廣州亞加達國際預科
Transcriptions
Standard Mandarin
- Hanyu Pinyin: Guǎngzhōu Yàjiādá Guójì Yùkē
Yue: Cantonese
- Jyutping: gwong2 zau1 aa3 gaa1 daat6 gwok3 zai3 jyu6 fo1

Alcanta International College (AIC; Chinese: 广州亚加达国际预科) is an international school in Baiyun District, Guangzhou.

== Curriculum ==
It offers an International Baccalaureate to students aged 14 to 17, including Mainland Chinese and international students, with a maximum class size of 17.

Alcanta International College

Address
- 14 Guangsheng Road, Nansha District, Guangzhou, Guangdong province, China

Information
- Motto: Achieve, Inspire and Create
- Established: 2011
