= Longgui station =

Guangzhou Metro station

Coordinates: 23.288736°N 113.300834°E

Longgui 龙归
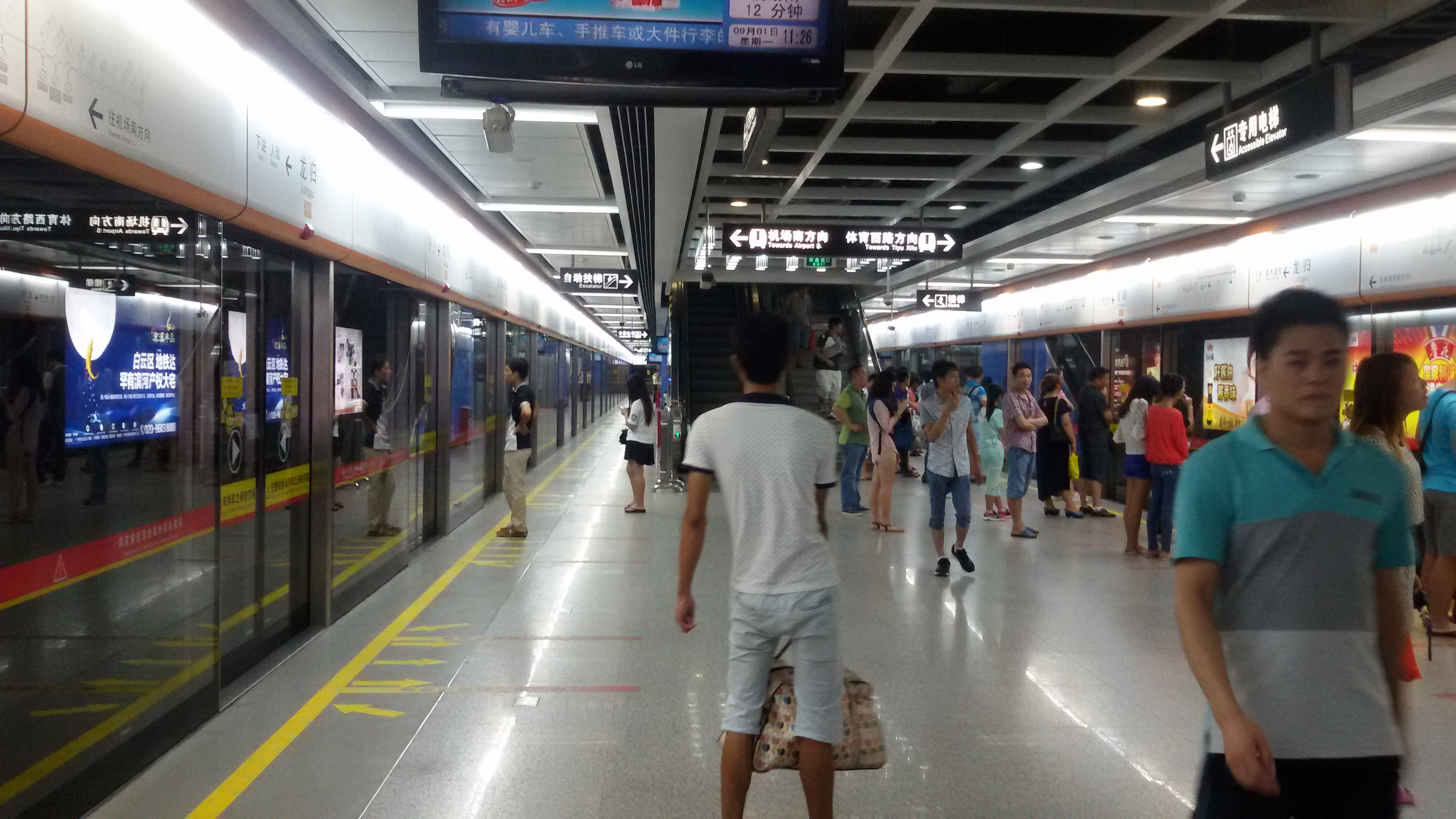

Chinese name
- Simplified Chinese: 龙归站
- Traditional Chinese: 龍歸站
- Literal meaning: Dragon Return station
Transcriptions
Standard Mandarin
- Hanyu Pinyin: Lóngguī Zhàn
Yue: Cantonese
- Yale Romanization: Lùhnggwāi Jaahm
- Jyutping: Lung^{4}gwai^{1} Zaam^{6}
- Hong Kong Romanization: Lung Kwai station

General information
- Location: Baiyun District, Guangzhou, Guangdong; China
- Operated by: Guangzhou Metro Co. Ltd.
- Line: Line 3
- Platforms: 2 (1 island platform)

Construction
- Structure type: Underground

Other information
- Station code: 326

History
- Opened: 30 October 2010; 15 years ago

Services
Preceding station	Guangzhou Metro	Following station
Jiahewanggang towards Haibang	Line 3	Renhe towards Airport North (Terminal 2)
Location

Longgui Station (simplified Chinese: 龙归站; traditional Chinese: 龍歸站; Cantonese Yale: Lùhnggwāi Jaahm) is a metro station on Line 3 of the Guangzhou Metro. The underground station is located to the north of the Guanghua Highway (广花公路) and Nancun Avenue (南村大道) in the Baiyun District of Guangzhou. It started operation in 30 October 2010.
