= Longgui, Shaoguan =

Longgui 龙归镇
- Town
- Location in Guangdong
- Coordinates: 24°43′57″N 113°27′17″E
- Country: People's Republic of China
- Province: Guangdong
- Prefecture-level city: Shaoguan
- District: Wujiang District
- Time zone: UTC+8 (China Standard)

Longgui (simplified Chinese: 龙归; traditional Chinese: 龍歸; pinyin: Lóngguī) is a town under the administration of Wujiang District, Shaoguan, Guangdong, China. As of 2023, it administers Longgui Residential Community and the following fifteen villages:

- Longgui Village
- Xuyuan Village (续源村)
- Shanqian Village (山前村)
- Qishi Village (奇石村)
- Aotou Village (坳头村)
- Long'an Village (龙安村)
- Chongxia Village (冲下村)
- Liu Village (留村)
- Shezhu Village (社主村)
- Madu Village (马渡村)
- Siqian Village (寺前村)
- Houping Village (后坪村)
- Pan Village (盘村)
- Fengtian Village (凤田村)
- Fangtian Village (方田村)
