= Baiyun, Guangzhou =

Baiyun 白云区
- District
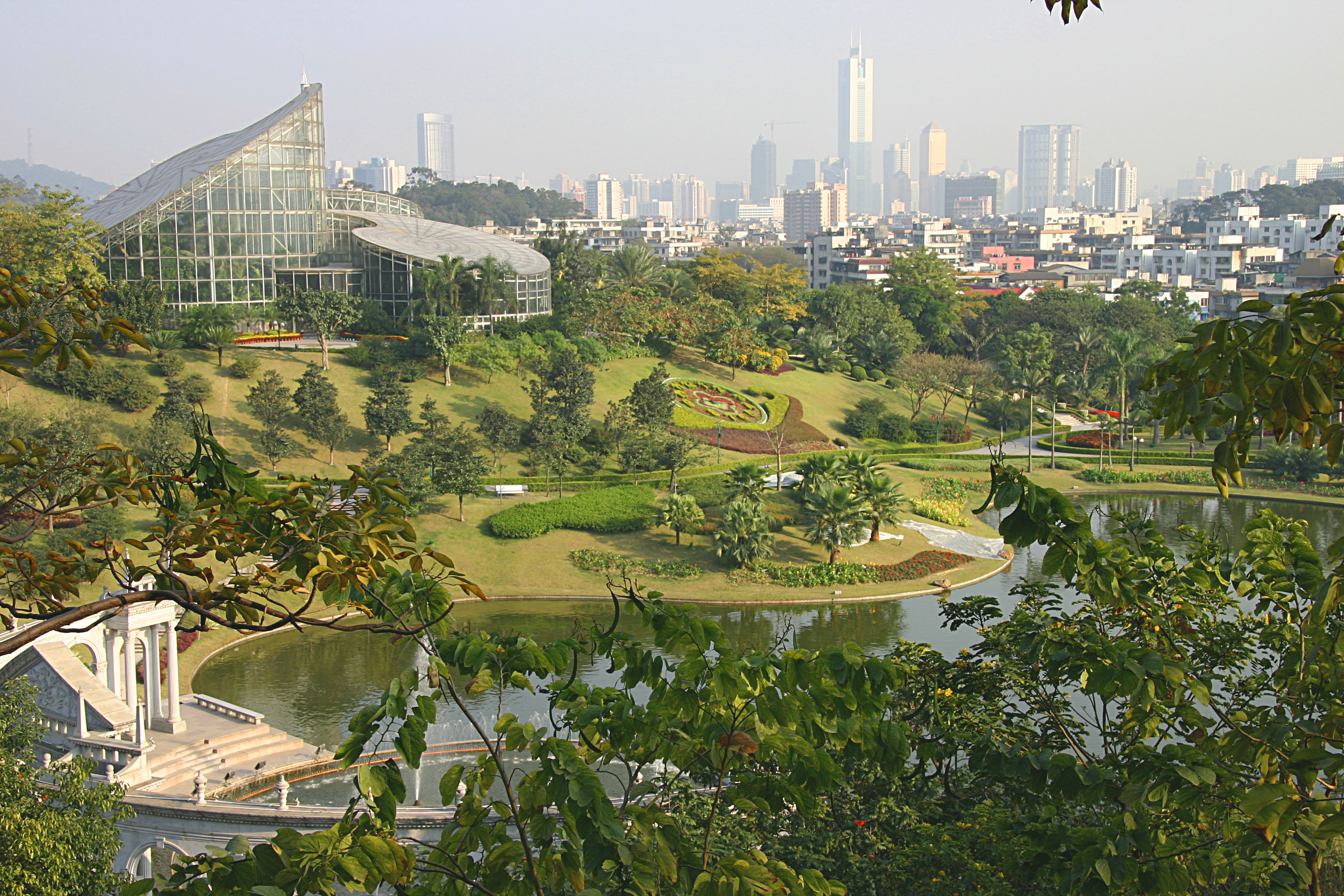
- Yuntai Garden at the foothills of Baiyun Mountain
- Interactive map of Baiyun
- Location within Guangdong
- Coordinates (Baiyun District government): 23°09′27″N 113°16′24″E
- Country: People's Republic of China
- Province: Guangdong
- Sub-provincial city: Guangzhou

Area
  - Total: 825 km^{2} (319 sq mi)

Population (2020 census)
  - Total: 3,742,991
  - Density: 4,540/km^{2} (11,800/sq mi)
- Time zone: UTC+8 (China Standard)
- Postal code: 510080
- Area code: 020
- Website: http://www.by.gov.cn/

Baiyun, Guangzhou
- Simplified Chinese: 白云区
- Traditional Chinese: 白雲區
- Guangdong Romanization: bak6 wan4 kêu1
- Hanyu Pinyin: Báiyún Qū
Transcriptions
Standard Mandarin
- Hanyu Pinyin: Báiyún Qū
Yue: Cantonese
- Yale Romanization: Baahkwàhn Kēui
- Jyutping: baak6 wan4 keoi1
- Canton Romanization: bak6 wan4 kêu1

Alternative Chinese name
- Simplified Chinese: 白云
- Traditional Chinese: 白雲
- Guangdong Romanization: bak6 wan4
- Hanyu Pinyin: Báiyún
Transcriptions
Standard Mandarin
- Hanyu Pinyin: Báiyún
Yue: Cantonese
- Yale Romanization: Baahkwàhn
- Jyutping: baak6 wan4
- Canton Romanization: bak6 wan4

Baiyun District is one of 11 urban districts of the prefecture-level city of Guangzhou, the capital of Guangdong Province, China. The district is located in the city's northern suburbs and is named after the Baiyun Mountain (the "White Cloud Mountain"), one of the area's natural attractions.

== Administrative divisions ==
There are currently 18 subdistricts and 4 towns.

On 19 December 2013 four new subdistricts (Yuncheng, Helong, Baiyunhu, and Shimen) were established from carving out of existing subdistricts.

Name	Chinese (S)	Hanyu Pinyin	Canton Romanization	Population (2010)	Area (km^{2})
Jingtai Subdistrict	景泰街道	Jǐngtài Jiēdào	ging2 tai3 gai1 dou6	82,226	11.40
Songzhou Subdistrict	松洲街道	Sōngzhōu Jiēdào	cung4 zeo1 gai1 dou6	106,274	9.30
Tongde Subdistrict	同德街道	Tóngdé Jiēdào	tung4 dak1 gai1 dou6	105,310	3.60
Huangshi Subdistrict	黄石街道	Huángshí Jiēdào	wong4 sék6 gai1 dou6	117,339	5.71
Tangjing Subdistrict	棠景街道	Tángjǐng Jiēdào	tong4 ging2 gai1 dou6	89,895	4.23
Xinshi Subdistrict	新市街道	Xīnshì Jiēdào	san1 si5 gai1 dou6	152,292	3.36
Yuncheng Subdistrict	云城街道	Yúnchéng Jiēdào	wen4 sing4 gai1 dou6	152,292	3.74
Sanyuanli Subdistrict	三元里街道	Sānyuánlǐ Jiēdào	sam1 yun4 léi5 gai1 dou6	100,149	6.80
Tonghe Subdistrict	同和街道	Tónghé Jiēdào	tung4 wo4 gai1 dou6	89,362	24.25
Jingxi Subdistrict	京溪街道	Jīngxī Jiēdào	ging1 kei1 gai1 dou6	91,970	5.51
Yongping Subdistrict	永平街道	Yǒngpíng Jiēdào	wing5 ping4 gai1 dou6	124,000	14.44
Junhe Subdistrict	均禾街道	Jūnhé Jiēdào	guen1 wo4 gai1 dou6	124,909	19.80
Jinsha Subdistrict	金沙街道	Jīnshā Jiēdào	gam1 sa1 gai1 dou6	52,657	10.20
Shijing Subdistrict	石井街道	Shíjǐng Jiēdào	sék6 zéng2 gai1 dou6	209,022	3.48
Baiyunhu Subdistrict	白云湖街道	Báiyúnhú Jiēdào	bak6 wan4 wu4 gai1 dou6	209,022	16.00
Shimen Subdistrict	石门街道	Shímén Jiēdào	sék6 mun4 gai1 dou6	209,022	19.80
Jiahe Subdistrict	嘉禾街道	Jiāhé Jiēdào	gaa1 wo4 gai1 dou6	87,696	4.00
Helong Subdistrict	鹤龙街道	Hèlóng Jiēdào	hog6 lung4 gai1 dou6	87,696	6.00
Renhe town	人和镇	Rénhé Zhèn	yen4 wo4 zen3	127,795	74.10
Taihe town	太和镇	Tàihé Zhèn	tai3 wo4 zen3	208,589	155.37
Longgui Subdistrict	龙归街道	Lóngguī Jiēdào	lung4 gai1 dou6	208,589	
Dayuan Subdistrict	大源街道	Dàyuán Jiēdào	dai6 gai1 dou6	208,589	
Jianggao town	江高镇	Jiānggāo Zhèn	gong1 gou1 zen3	161,343	95.71
Zhongluotan town	钟落潭镇	Zhōngluòtán Zhèn	zung1 log6 tam4 zen3	192,322	169.40

== History ==
Nowadays Baiyun District was originally governed by Panyu County (now Panyu District) and Nanhai County (now Nanhai District). However, since 1924, the district changed its name as new suburb of Guangzhou (Canton) city. in June 1954, Baiyun District was formally established.

== Economy ==
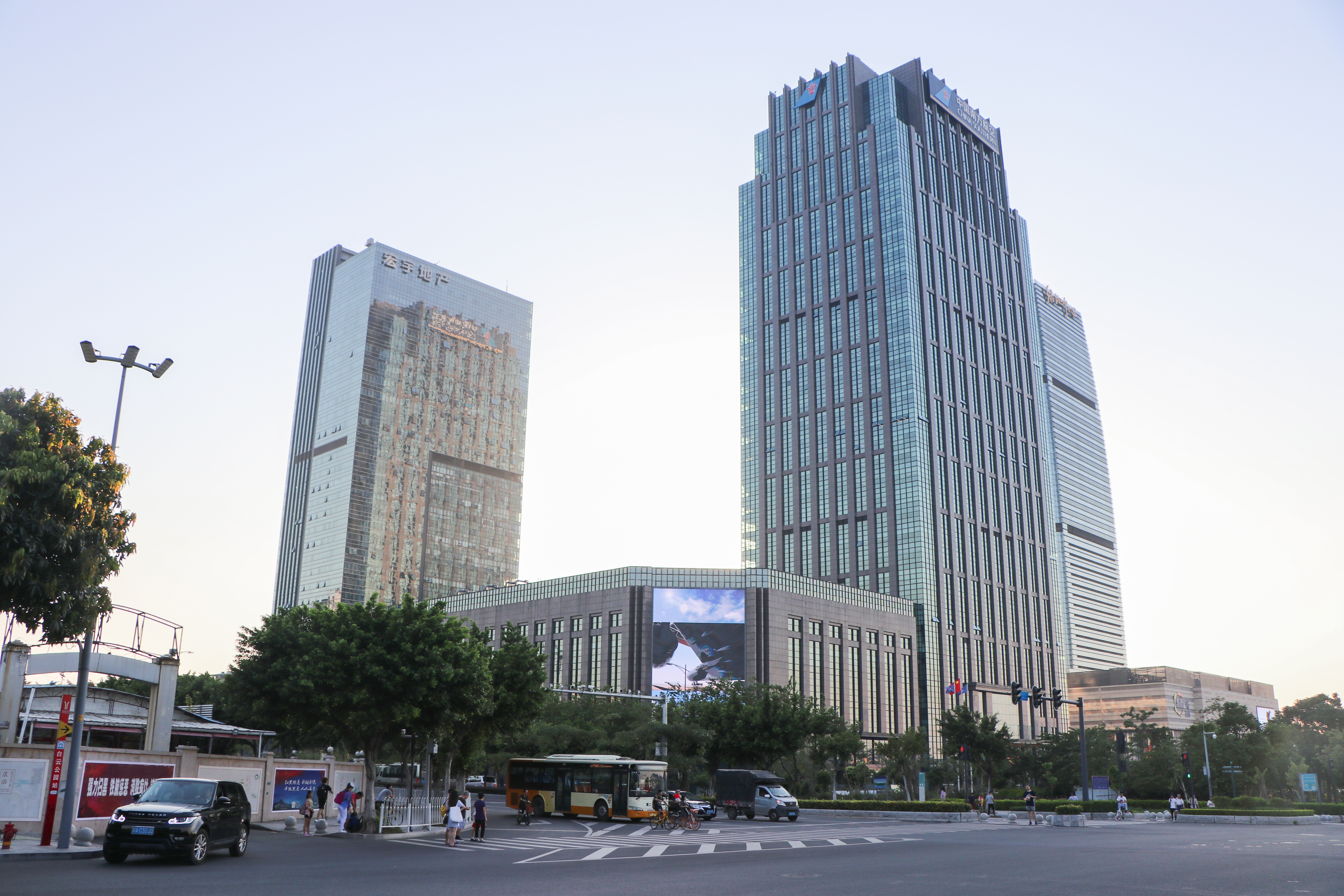
China Southern Air Building, the company headquarters in Baiyun District

For many years, Guangzhou's main airport, the (Former) Guangzhou Baiyun International Airport was located within Baiyun District. In 2004, the airport was relocated farther north from the city center. Although the new airport has retained the name Guangzhou Baiyun International Airport, most of it is actually located in the neighboring Huadu District, just north of its border with the Baiyun District.

China Southern Airlines is headquartered in the Baiyun District.

9Air is headquartered in Xicheng Village, Renhe Town (人和镇), Baiyun District.

== Transportation ==
=== Metro ===
Baiyun is currently serviced by eight metro lines operated by Guangzhou Metro:

- Line 2 - Jiahewanggang ( 3 , 14 ), Huangbian, Jiangxia, Xiao-gang, Baiyun Culture Square ( 12 ), Baiyun Park, Feixiang Park, Sanyuanli
- Line 3 - Gaozeng ( 9 ), Renhe, Longgui, Jiahewanggang ( 2 , 14 ), Baiyundadaobei, Yongtai, Tonghe, Jingxi Nanfang Hospital, Meihuayuan
- Line 6 - Xunfenggang ( 12 ), Hengsha, Shabei
- Line 8 - Jiaoxin, Tinggang, Shijing, Xiaoping, Shitan, Julong ( 12 ), Shangbu, Tongde, Ezhangtan
- Line 9 - Gaozeng ( 3 )
- Line 11 - Ziyuangang, Guangzhou University of Chinese Medicine, Dajinzhong Road
- Line 12 - Xunfenggang ( 6 ), Xunfenggang North, Xizhou, Julong ( 8 ), Guangzhou Baiyun Railway Station, Tangchong, Xinshixu ( 14 ), Baiyun Culture Square ( 2 ), Guangzhou Gymnasium
- Line 14 - Lejia Road, Yunxiao Road, Xinshixu ( 12 ), Mawu, Hebian, Helong, Pengbian, Jiahewanggang ( 2 , 3 ), Baiyun Dongping, Xialiang, Taihe, Zhuliao, Zhongluotan, Mali, Xinhe

== Government and infrastructure ==
Guangdong Prison Administrative Bureau is headquartered in the district.

== Education ==
International schools in Baiyun District:

- École Française Internationale de Canton (French school)
- British School of Guangzhou
- Alcanta International College
- The original campus of Guangzhou Nanhu International School (now (Guangzhou Nanfang International School)
- Utahloy International School Guangzhou
