= Jiahe Subdistrict, Guangzhou =

Subdistrict in Guangzhou, People's Republic of China

Jiahe Subdistrict 嘉禾街道
- Subdistrict
- Interactive map of Jiahe Subdistrict
- Coordinates: 23°13′20″N 113°15′51″E
- Country: People's Republic of China
- Province: Guangdong
- Sub-provincial city: Guangzhou
- District: Baiyun

Area
  - Total: 10 km^{2} (3.9 sq mi)
- Time zone: UTC+8 (China Standard Time)

Jiahe Subdistrict (Chinese: 嘉禾街道; pinyin: Jiāhé Jiēdào; Jyutping: gaa^{1} wo^{4} gaai^{1} dou^{6}) is a subdistrict of Baiyun District, Guangzhou, People's Republic of China. As of 2020, it has 9 residential communities (社区) under its administration.

== See also ==
- List of township-level divisions of Guangdong
