= Ezhangtan station =

Metro station in Guangzhou, China

Ezhangtan 鹅掌坦
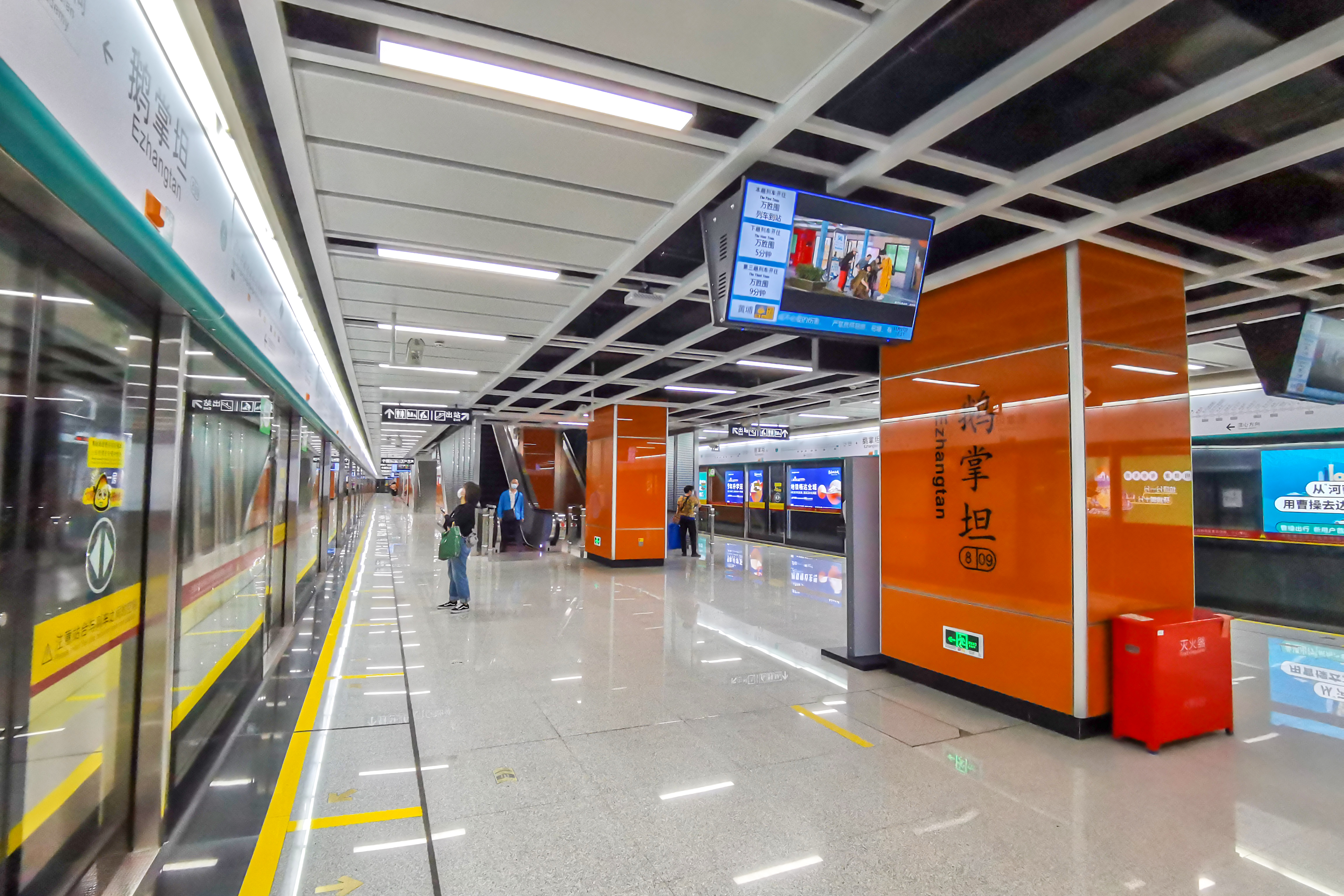
- Platform

Chinese name
- Simplified Chinese: 鹅掌坦站
- Traditional Chinese: 鵝掌坦站
Transcriptions
Standard Mandarin
- Hanyu Pinyin: Ézhǎngtǎn Zhàn
Yue: Cantonese
- Jyutping: ngo^{4} zoeng^{2} taan^{2} zaam^{6}

General information
- Location: Xicha Road, Ezhangtan Street, Tongde Subdistrict, Baiyun District, Guangzhou, Guangdong; China
- Coordinates: 23.1596472°N 113.2306500°E
- Operated by: Guangzhou Metro Co. Ltd.
- Line: Line 8
- Platforms: 2 (1 island platform)
- Tracks: 2

Construction
- Structure type: Underground
- Accessible: Yes

Other information
- Station code: 809

History
- Opened: 26 November 2020; 5 years ago

Services
Preceding station	Guangzhou Metro	Following station
Tongde towards Jiaoxin	Line 8	Xicun towards Wanshengwei
Location

Ezhangtan Station (simplified Chinese: 鹅掌坦站; traditional Chinese: 鵝掌坦站; pinyin: Ézhǎngtǎn Zhàn; Jyutping: ngo4 zoeng2 taan2 zaam6) is a station of Guangzhou Metro Line 8, located underground on the north-eastern side of Ezhangtan Street, Xicha Road, Tongde Subdistrict, Baiyun District, Guangzhou, Guangdong Province, China. The station was opened on November 26, 2020 with the opening of the northern extension of Guangzhou Metro Line 8.

The station has an underground island platform. Platform 1 is for trains towards Jiaoxin, whilst platform 2 is for trains towards Wanshengwei. There are 3 exits, lettered A, C and D. Exits A and C are accessible. All exits are located on Xicha Road.

== Gallery ==
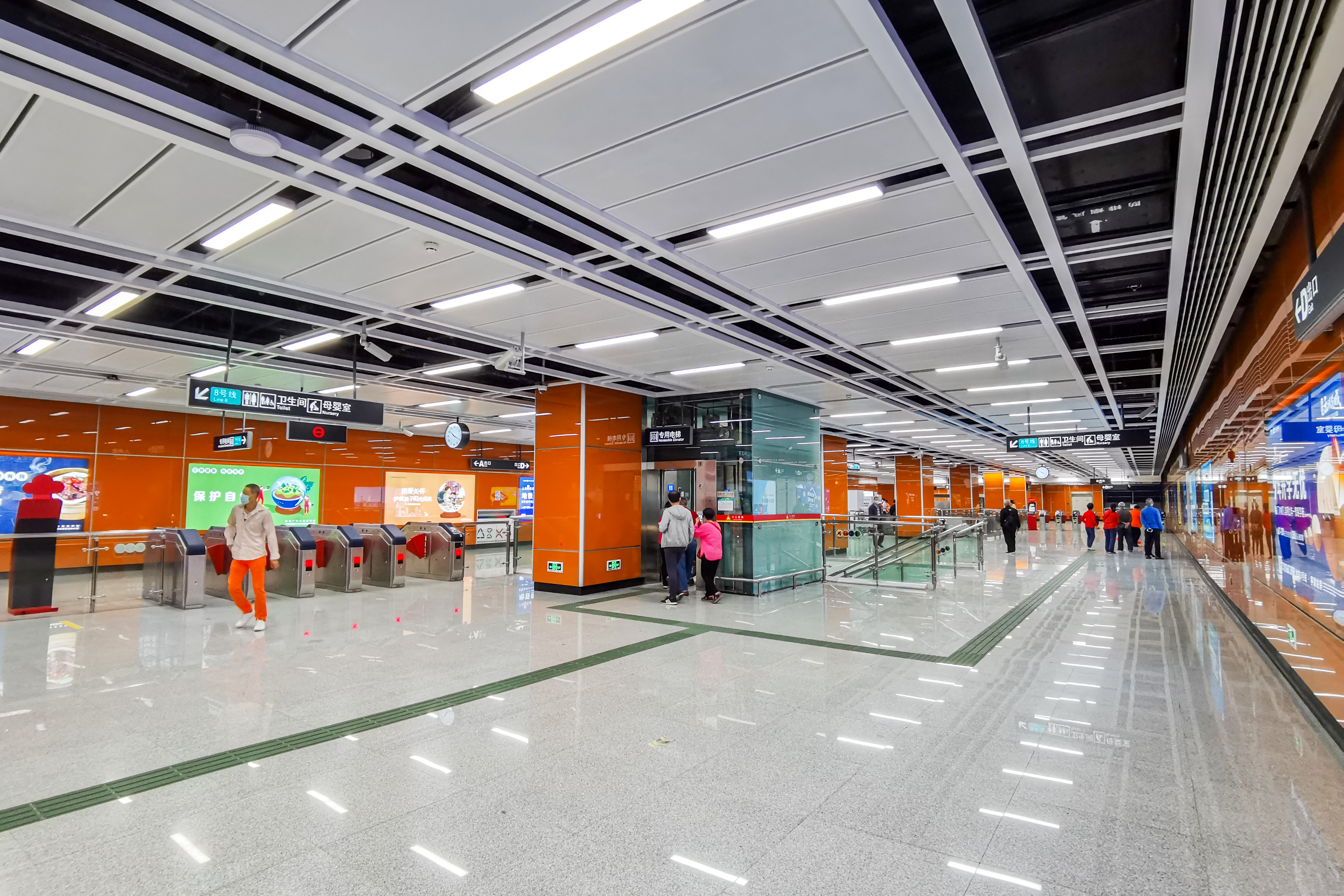
Concourse
