= Shangbu station =

Guangzhou Metro Line 8 station

Shangbu 上步
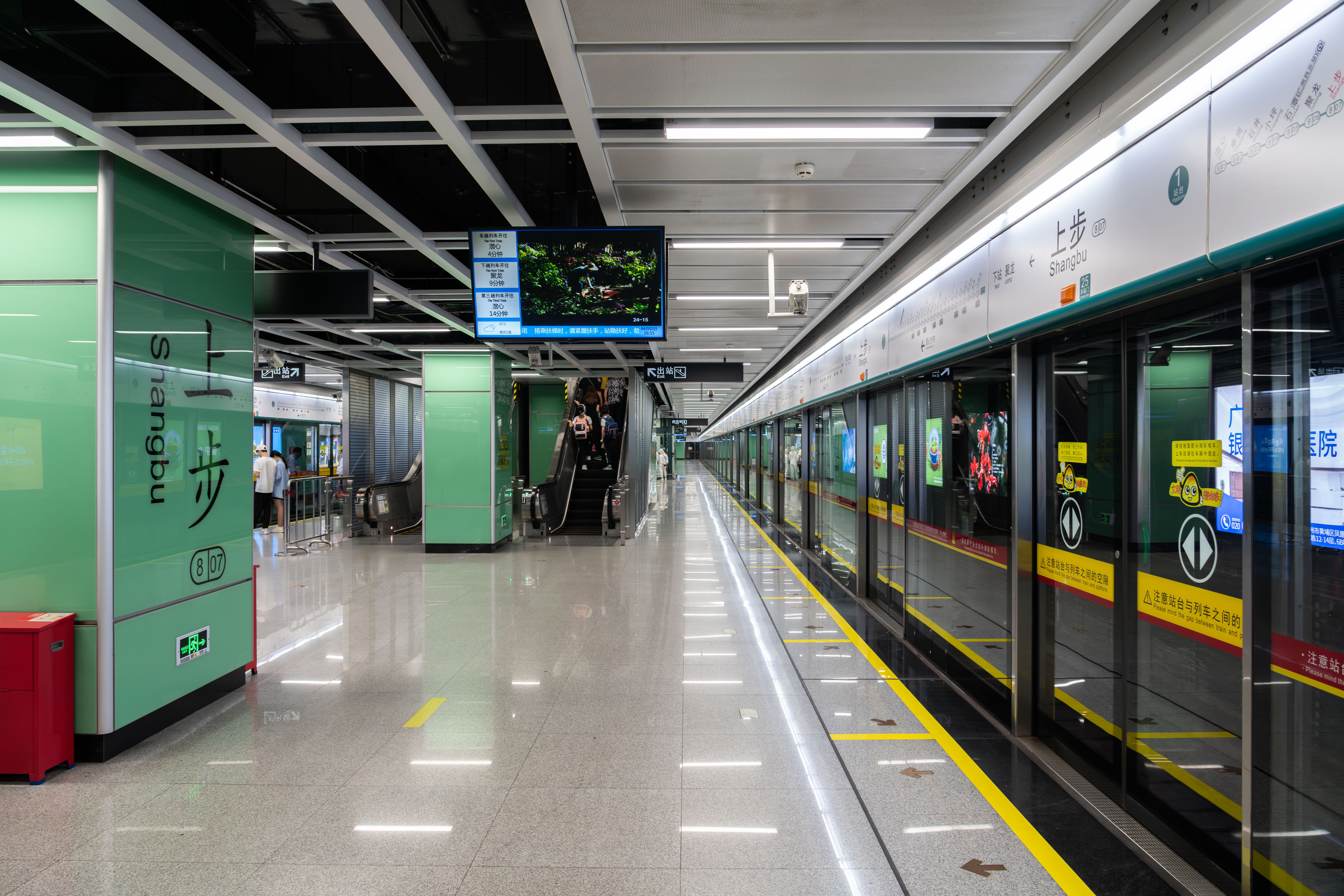
- Platform

Chinese name
- Chinese: 上步站
Transcriptions
Standard Mandarin
- Hanyu Pinyin: Shàngbù Zhàn
Yue: Cantonese
- Yale Romanization: Seuhngbou Jaahm
- Jyutping: Soeng^{6}bou^{6} Zaam^{6}

General information
- Location: Intersection of Xicha Road (西槎路) and Shanfang North Street (山坊北街); Tongde Subdistrict, Baiyun District, Guangzhou, Guangdong; China
- Coordinates: 23°10′24.6900″N 113°13′49.1002″E
- Operator: Guangzhou Metro Co. Ltd.
- Line: Line 8
- Platforms: 2 (1 island platform)
- Tracks: 2

Construction
- Structure type: Underground
- Accessible: Yes

Other information
- Station code: 807

History
- Opened: 26 November 2020 (5 years ago)

Services
Preceding station	Guangzhou Metro	Following station
Julong towards Jiaoxin	Line 8	Tongde towards Wanshengwei
Location

Shangbu Station (Chinese: 上步站; pinyin: Shàngbù Zhàn; Cantonese Yale: Seuhngbou Jaahm) is a station on Line 8 of the Guangzhou Metro, located underground on the intersection of Shanfang North Street and Xicha Road in Guangzhou's Baiyun District. The station was opened on 26 November 2020, with the opening of the northern extension of Guangzhou Metro Line 8.

As with other stations on the northern extension of Line 8, the name of this station was published on 2 December 2016.

== Station structure ==
=== Platform layout ===
The station is a two-storey underground station. The ground level is the exit, and it is surrounded by Xicha Road, Shanfang North Street, Shangbu Road, Shangbu Garden and other nearby buildings. The first floor is the concourse, and the second floor is the platform for Line 8.

Like the stations in the northern extension of Line 8, this station is decorated in glass curtain panels. The color of the station is mint green.

G	-	Exits A, C, D
L1; Concourse	Concourse	Ticket Machines, Customer Service, Shops, Police Station, Security Facilities
L2; Platforms	Platform 1	8 towards Jiaoxin (Julong)
L2; Platforms	Island platform, doors will open on the left (Toilets, Nursery)
L2; Platforms	Platform 2	8 towards Wanshengwei (Tongde)

=== Concourse ===
The concourse is equipped with ticket machines and a customer service center. There is also a 7-Eleven convenience store and self-service facilities like automatic vending machines. There are elevators, escalators and stairs in the fare-paid area for passengers to access the platform.

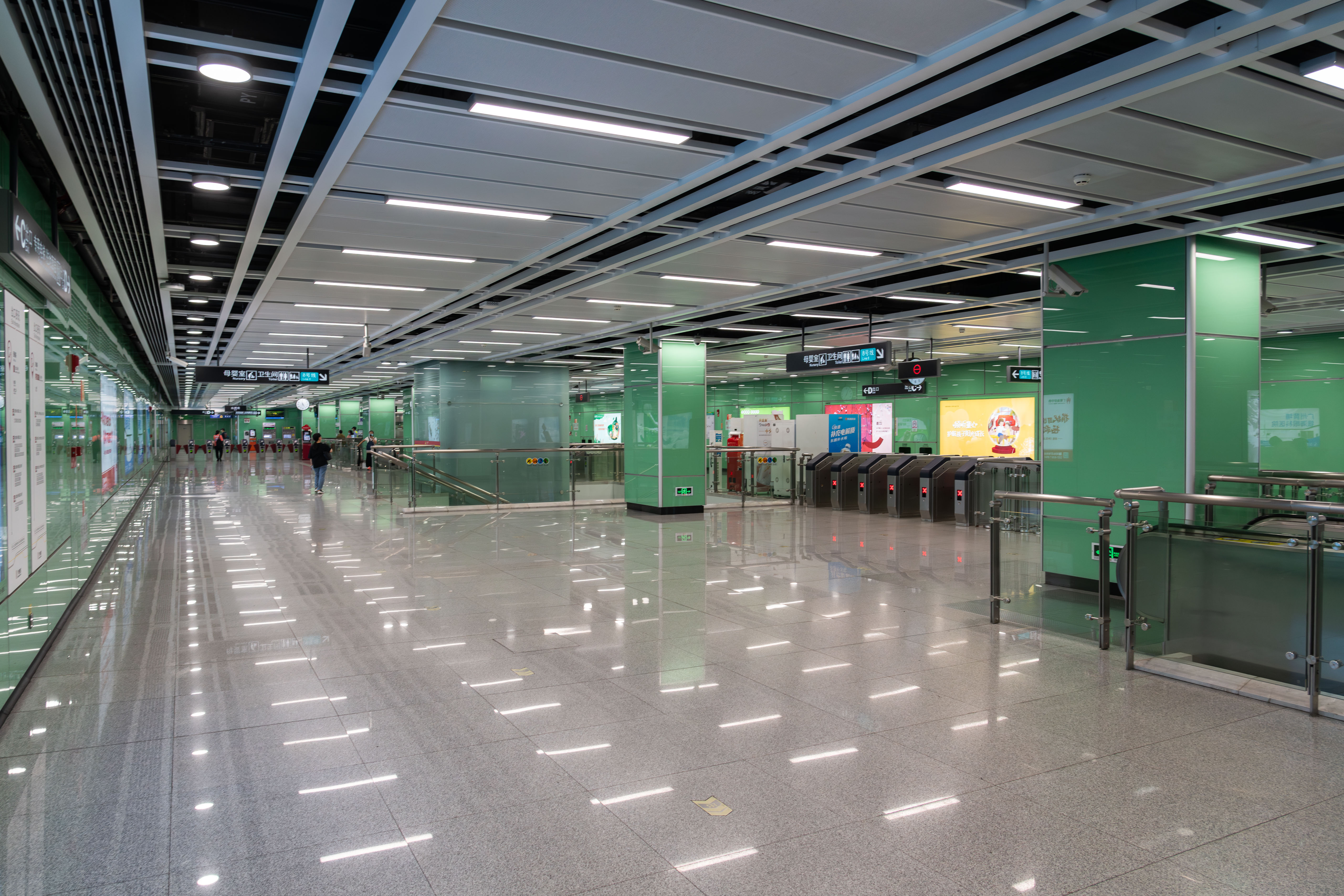
Concourse

=== Platform ===
The station has an island platform under Xicha Road. Toilets and a nursery room are located at the southern end of the platform towards Tongde.

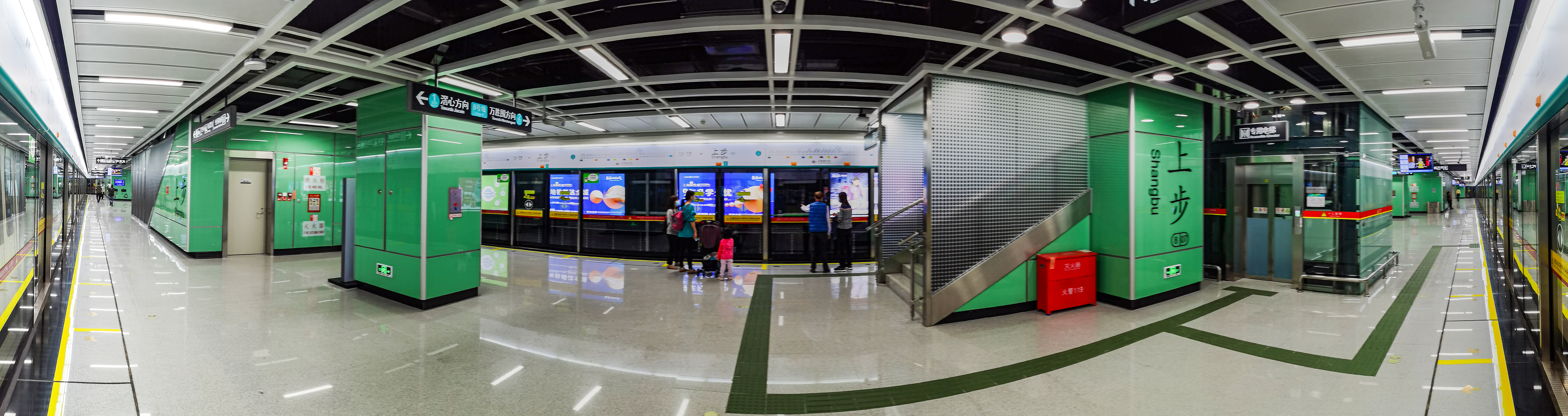
Platform panorama

=== Entrances/exits ===
The station has 3 points of entry/exit, of which Exits C and D opened with the station's initial opening, whilst Exit A on the east side was opened on 10 September 2024 due to construction delays from land acquisition, demolition and pipeline relocation. Exit D is accessible via elevator.

- A: Xicha Road
- C: Xicha Road, Affiliated Hospital of Traditional Chinese Medicine of Guangzhou Medical University (Tongde Campus)
- D: Xicha Road
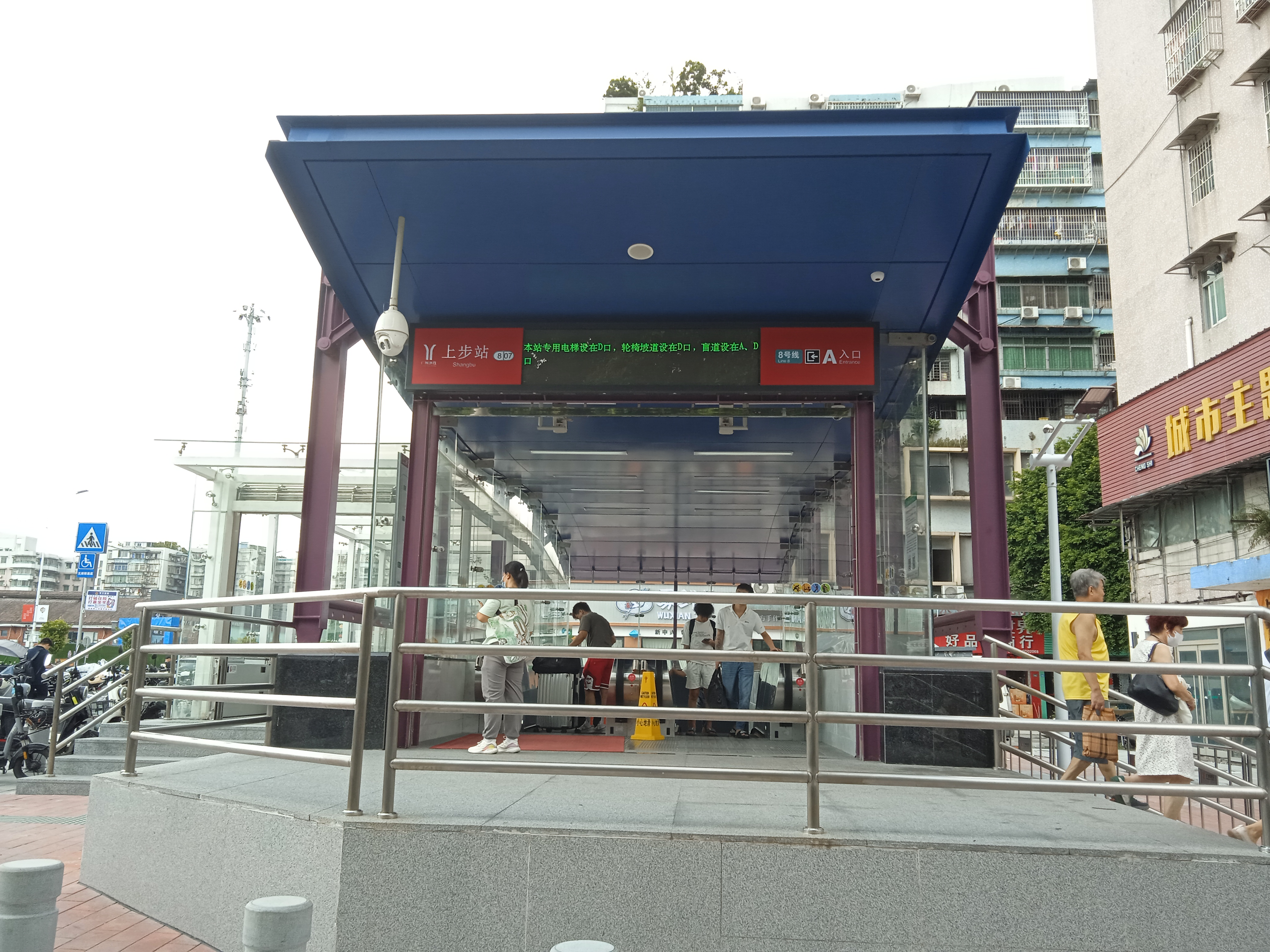
Entrance A

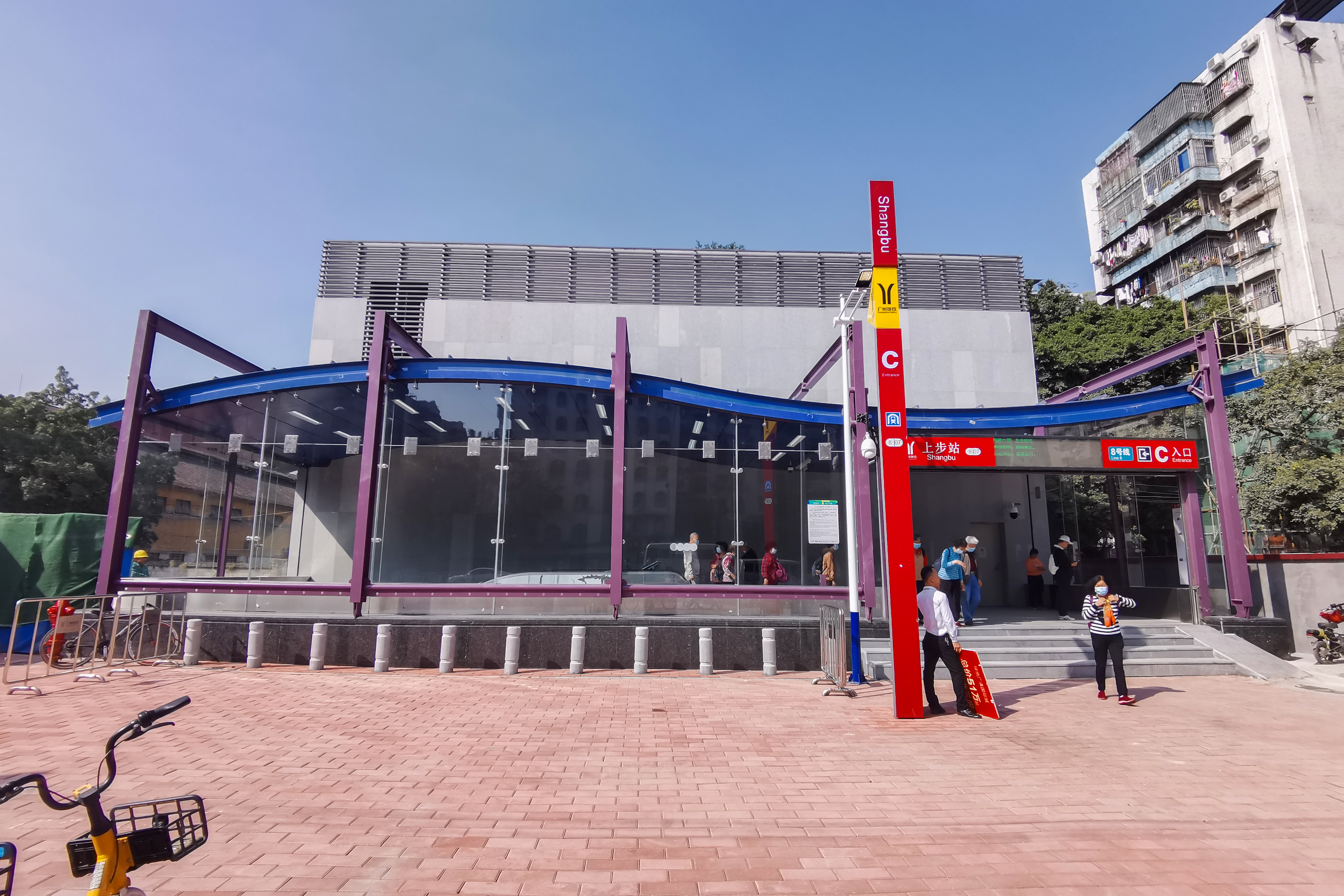
Entrance C

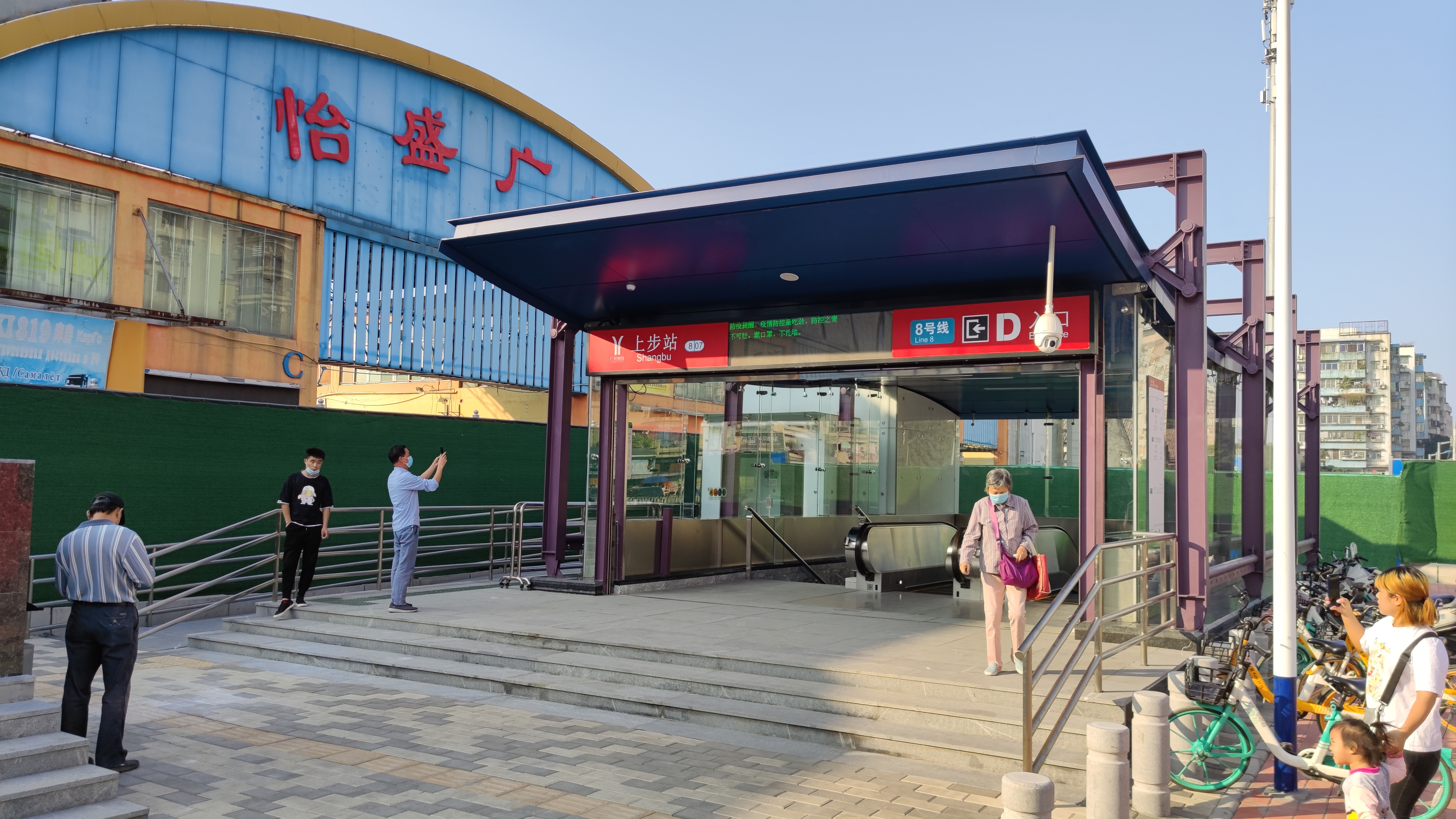
Entrance D

== History ==
In 1997, in the "Guangzhou City Urban Expressway, Traffic Network Planning Research (Final Report)", the then Line 4 set up this station. In the 2003 plan, most of the section of the line became part of the current Line 8, and this station became one of the stations in the northern extension of Line 8. Initially, the station was named Hengjiao station before being later changed to Shangbu station.

The roof slab of the station was sealed on 6 March 2018. The station successfully transmitted power in March 2020 and completed the "three rights" transfer on 31 July the same year.

On 26 November 2020, the station opened with the opening of the northern extension of Line 8.

During COVID-19 pandemic control rules in 2022, the station was affected by prevention and control measures many times and needed to adjust its services. During the epidemic in April, the station was suspended from 9 to 23 April. During the year-end epidemic, the station was suspended from 21 to 27 November.
