= Julong station =

Guangzhou Metro Line 8 and Line 12 station

Julong 聚龙
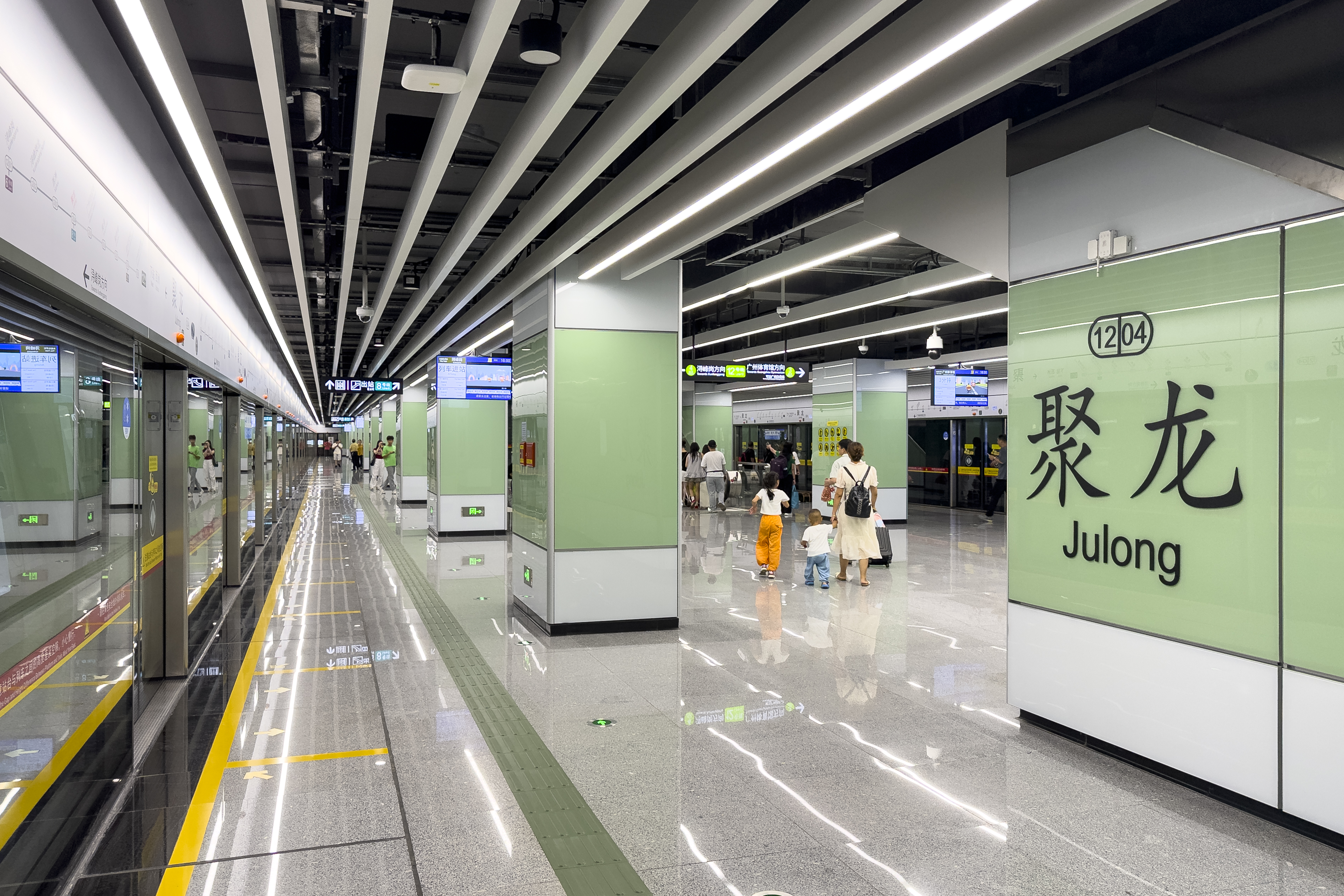
- Platform 4 (Line 12 towards Xunfenggang)

Chinese name
- Simplified Chinese: 聚龙站
- Traditional Chinese: 聚龍站
- Literal meaning: gathering dragons station
Transcriptions
Standard Mandarin
- Hanyu Pinyin: Jùlóng Zhàn
Yue: Cantonese
- Yale Romanization: Jèuhlùhng Jaahm
- Jyutping: Zeoi^{6}lung^{4} Zaam^{6}
- Hong Kong Romanization: Tsui Lung station

General information
- Location: Intersection of Xicha Road (西槎路), Shicha Road (石槎路) and Dekang Road (德康路); Border of Tongde Subdistrict and Shijing Subdistricts, Baiyun District, Guangzhou, Guangdong; China
- Coordinates: 23°11′2.2700″N 113°14′0.3998″E
- Operator: Guangzhou Metro Co. Ltd.
- Lines: Line 8; Line 12
- Platforms: 4 (2 island platforms)
- Tracks: 4

Construction
- Structure type: Underground
- Accessible: Yes

Other information
- Station code: 806 1204

History
- Opened: Line 8: 26 November 2020 (5 years ago); Line 12: 29 June 2025 (16 months ago)

Services
Preceding station	Guangzhou Metro	Following station
Shitan towards Jiaoxin	Line 8	Shangbu towards Wanshengwei
Xizhou towards Xunfenggang	Line 12 West section	Guangzhou Baiyun Railway Station towards Guangzhou Gymnasium
Location

Julong Station (simplified Chinese: 聚龙站; traditional Chinese: 聚龍站; Jyutping: zeoi^{6} lung^{4} zaam^{6}; Cantonese Yale: Jèuhlùhng Jaahm) is an interchange station between Line 8 and Line 12 of the Guangzhou Metro. It is located under the intersection of Xicha Road, Shicha Road and Dekang Road in Guangzhou's Baiyun District. The Line 8 station started operation on 26 November 2020. The Line 12 station started operation on 29 June 2025, becoming an interchange station.

== Station structure ==
The station is a three-storey underground station. The ground level is the exit, and it is surrounded by Xicha Road, Shicha Road, Dekang Road and other nearby buildings. The first floor is the concourse, the second floor is the platform for Line 8, and the third floor is the platform for Line 12.

The Line 8 section uses light blue as the main color. Like the stations in the northern extension of Line 8, it is decorated with glass panels. The Line 12 section is decorated with the uniform white of the standard station of Line 12 with a turquoise glass curtain wall.

G	-	Exits A, B, D, E, G, H
L1; Concourse	Concourse	Ticket Machines, Customer Service, Shops, Police Station, Security Facilities
L2; 8 Platforms	Platform 1	8 towards Jiaoxin (Shitan)
L2; 8 Platforms	Island platform, doors will open on the left (Toilets, Nursery)
L2; 8 Platforms	Platform 2	8 towards Wanshengwei (Shangbu)
M	Mezzanine	Towards Lines 8 and 12 platforms
L3; 12 Platforms	Platform 4	12 towards Xunfenggang (Xizhou)
L3; 12 Platforms	Island platform, doors will open on the left (Toilets, Nursery)
L3; 12 Platforms	Platform 3	12 towards Guangzhou Gymnasium (Guangzhou Baiyun Railway Station)

=== Concourse ===
The concourse is divided into two parts, Line 8 and Line 12, both on the first underground floor. The concourses are equipped with equipped with electronic ticket vending machines and AI customer service centers as well as 7-Eleven convenience stores and automatic vending machines. In addition, there is an automated external defibrillator next to the station control center near Exit B of Line 8 and near Exit H of Line 12. There are elevators, escalators and stairs in the fare-paid areas of Line 4 and Line 12 for passengers to access the platforms.

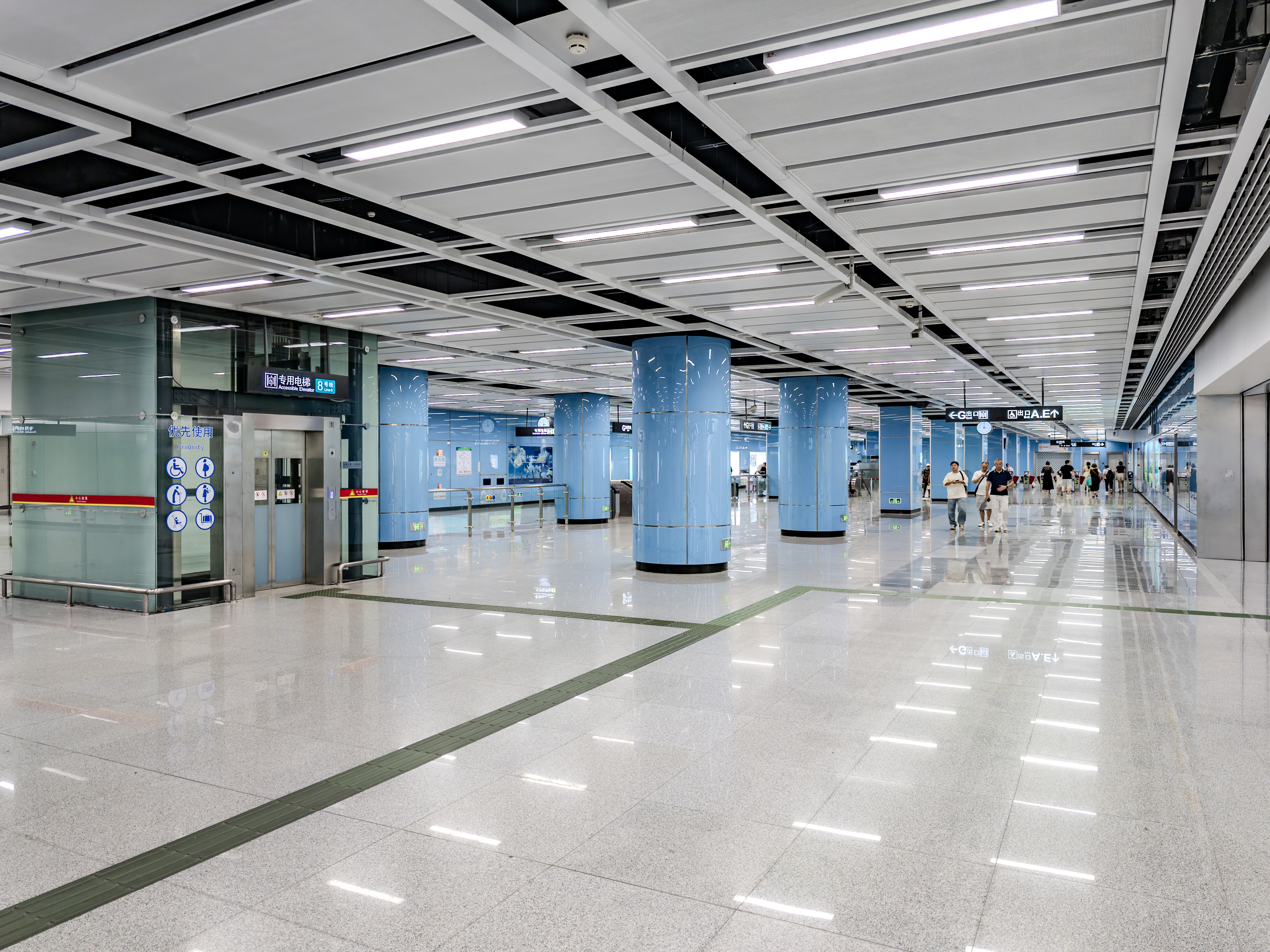
Line 8 concourse

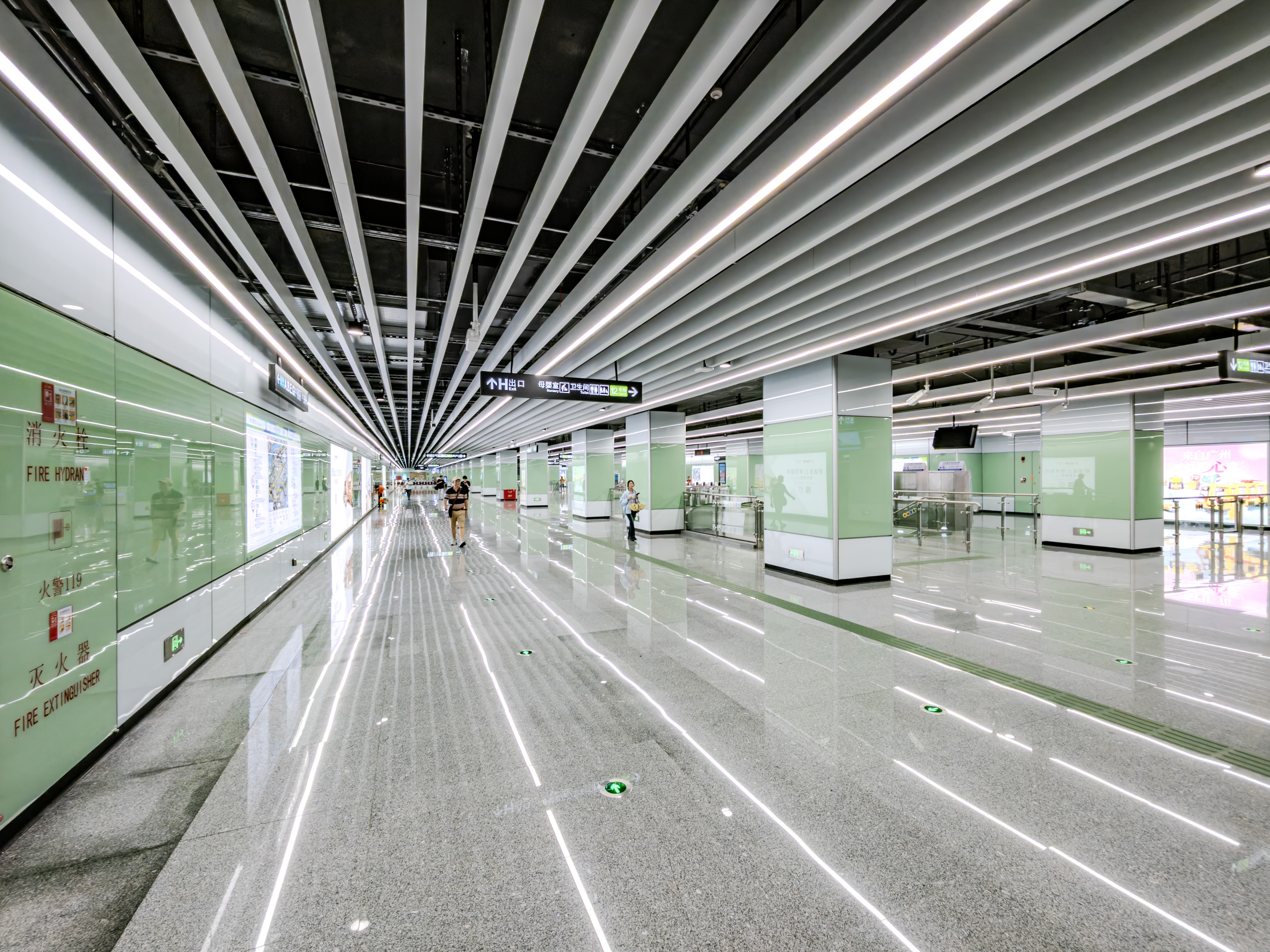
Line 12 concourse (east side)

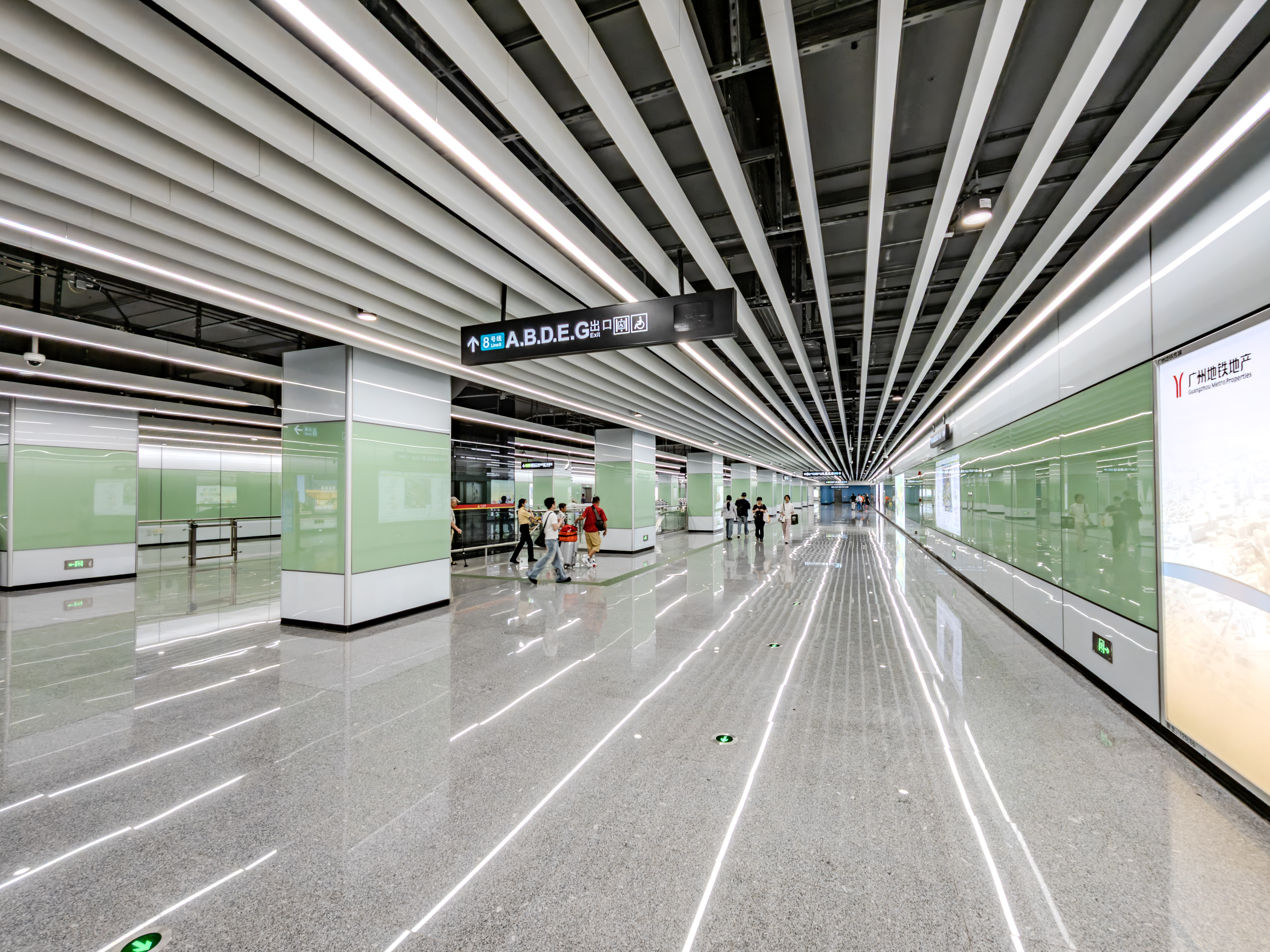
Line 12 concourse (west side)

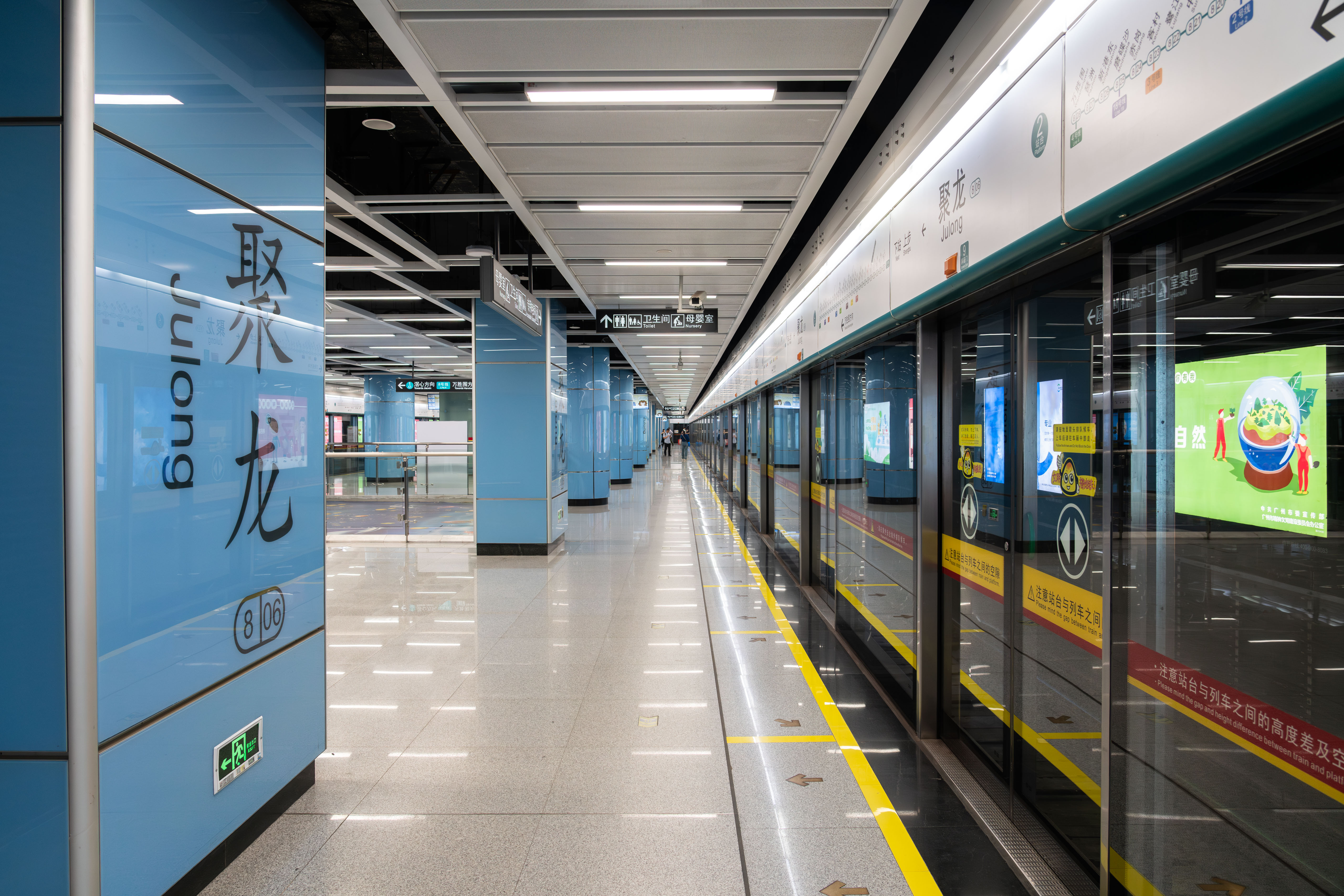
Platform 2 of Line 8

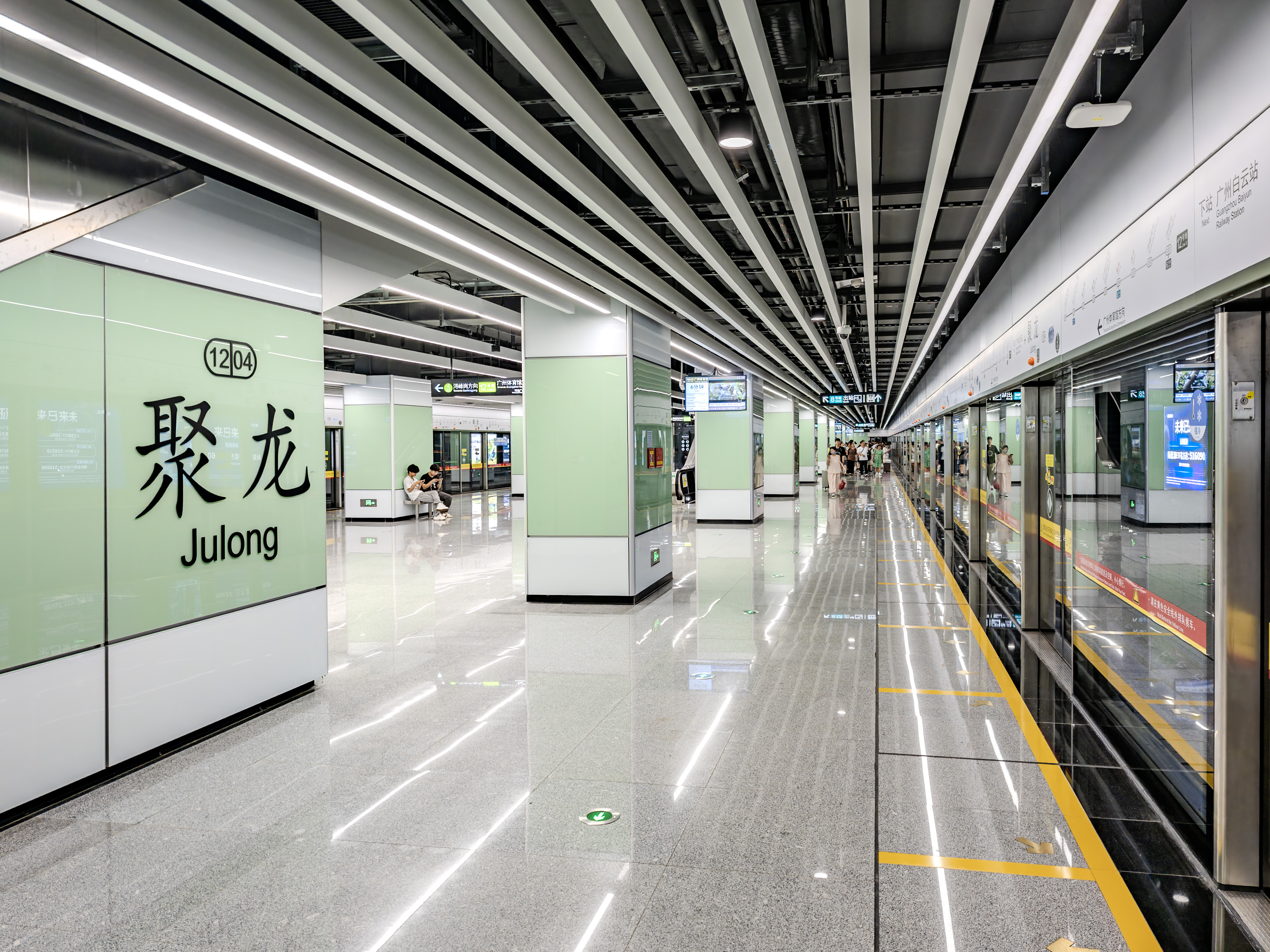
Platform 3 of Line 12

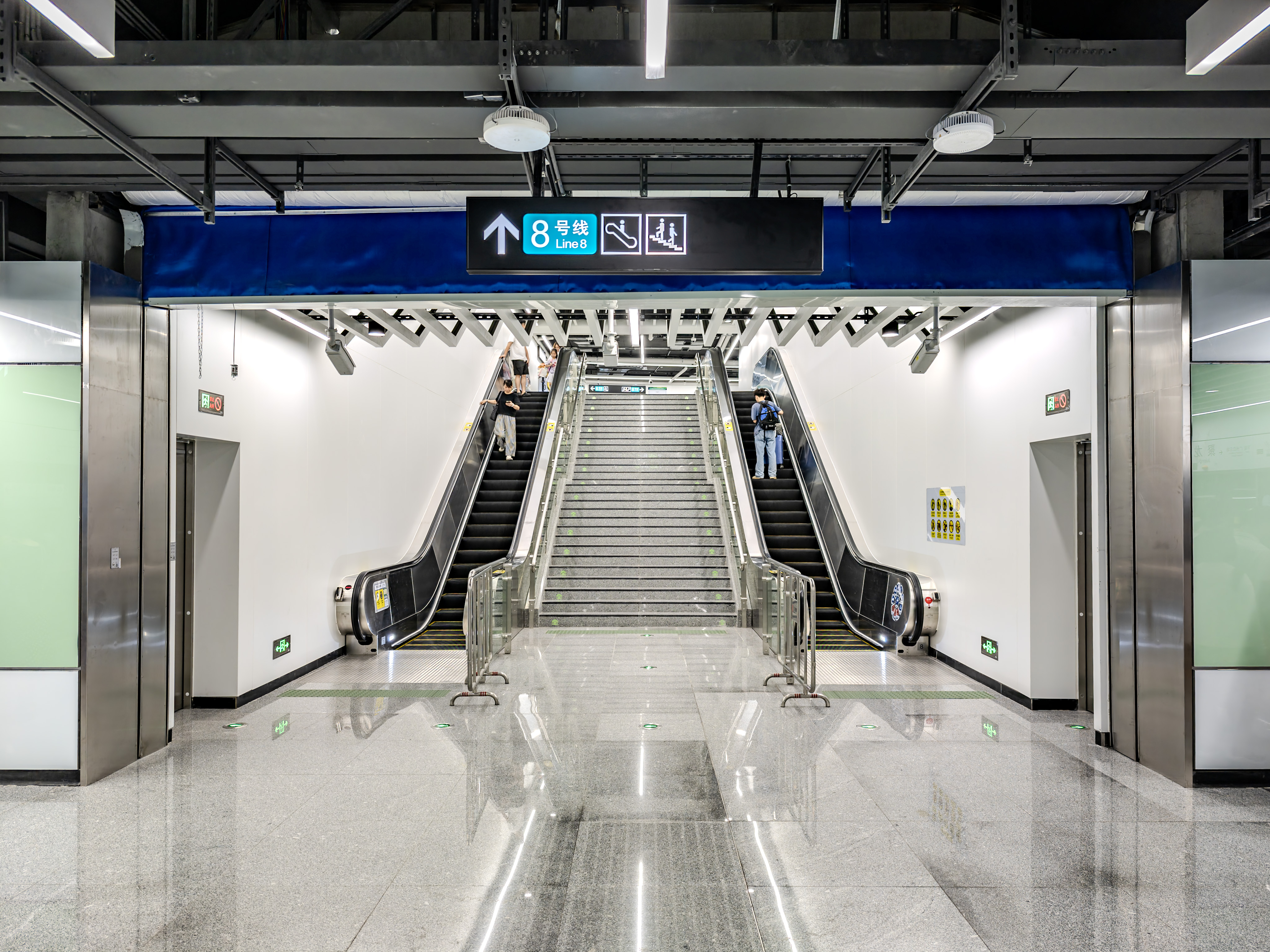
Line 12 transfer passage at the east end

=== Platform and transfer method ===
The station has an island platform each for Line 8 and Line 12. The Line 8 platform is located under Shicha Road, the Line 12 platform is located under the west side of Xicha Road. The two form a "T" shape, with Line 8 on the top and Line 12 on the bottom. For transfers, there is a nodal transfer mezzanine level between the second and third underground floors, connecting the middle of the Line 8 platform and the east end of the Line 12 platform respectively for passengers to transfer between the two lines. You can also transfer through the concourse.

Both platforms have toilets and a nursery room, of which for Line 8 it is located at the south end of the platform, and for Line 12 it is located at the west end of the platform towards Xunfenggang. In addition, there is a set of dual-storage lines on the north end of the Line 8 platform. This station is used as an intermediate terminus for Line 8, and some trains will turnback using these storage lines.

=== Entrances/exits ===
The station has 6 points of entry/exit, of which Exits A, B and D opened with the station's initial opening, Exit E was opened in early 2024, and Exits G and H opened with the west section of Line 12. Exit A is equipped with a stairlift, and Exits B and G are equipped with elevators.

- A: Dekang Road, Guangzhou No. 65 Middle School (Tongde Campus)
- B: Shicha Road
- D: Shicha Road
- E: Xicha Road
- G: Dekang Road
- H: Xicha Road
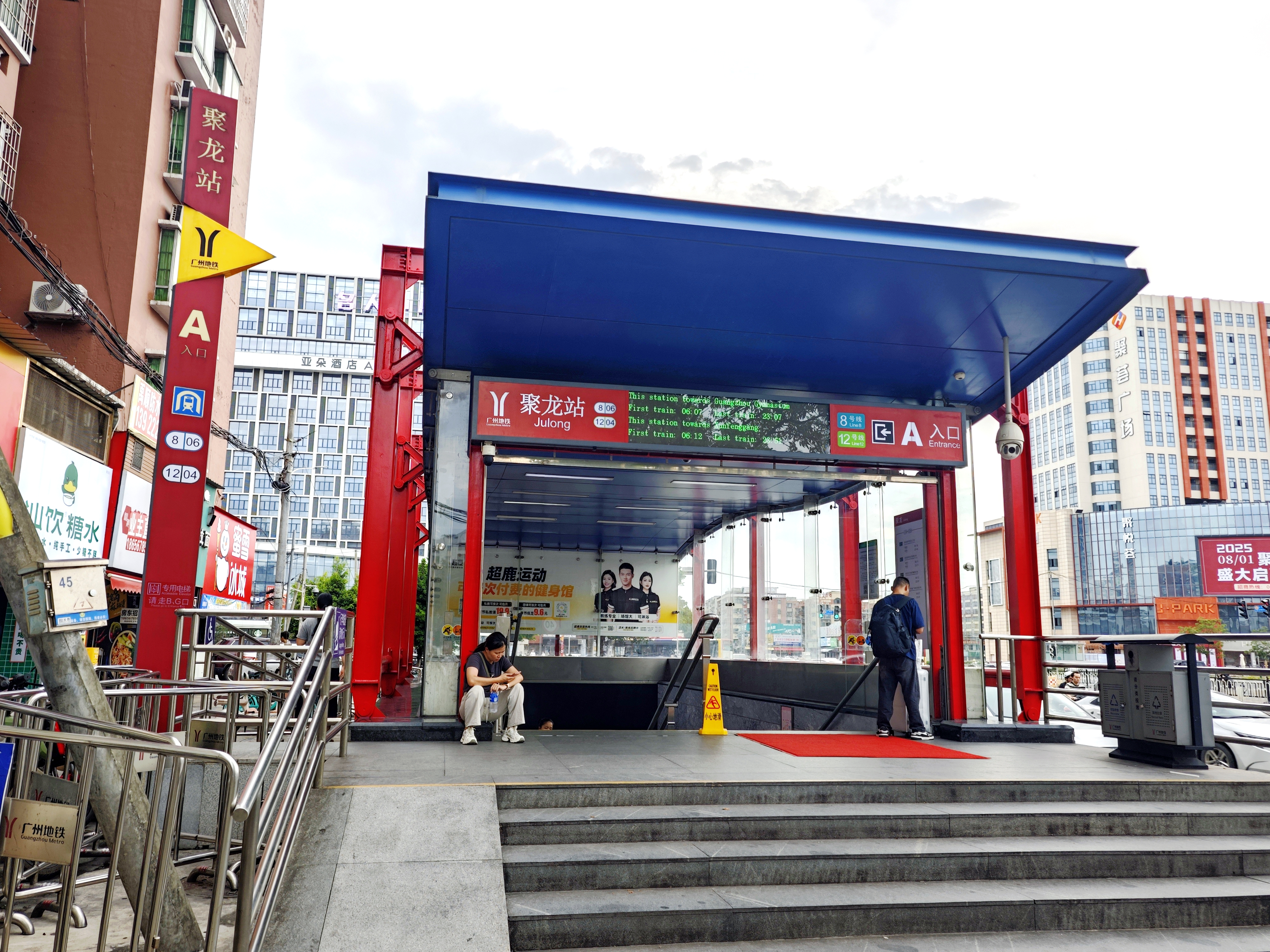
Entrance A

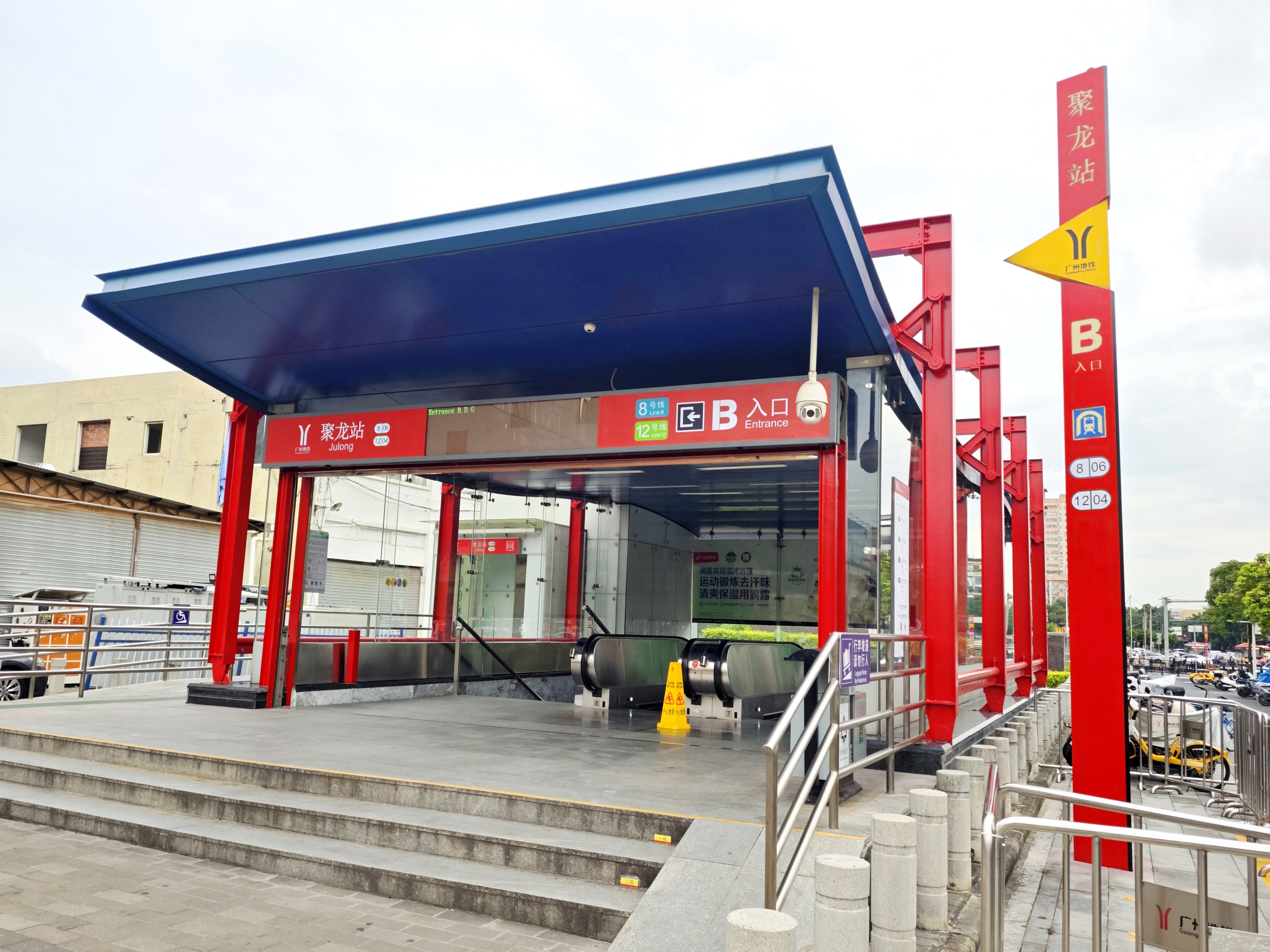
Entrance B

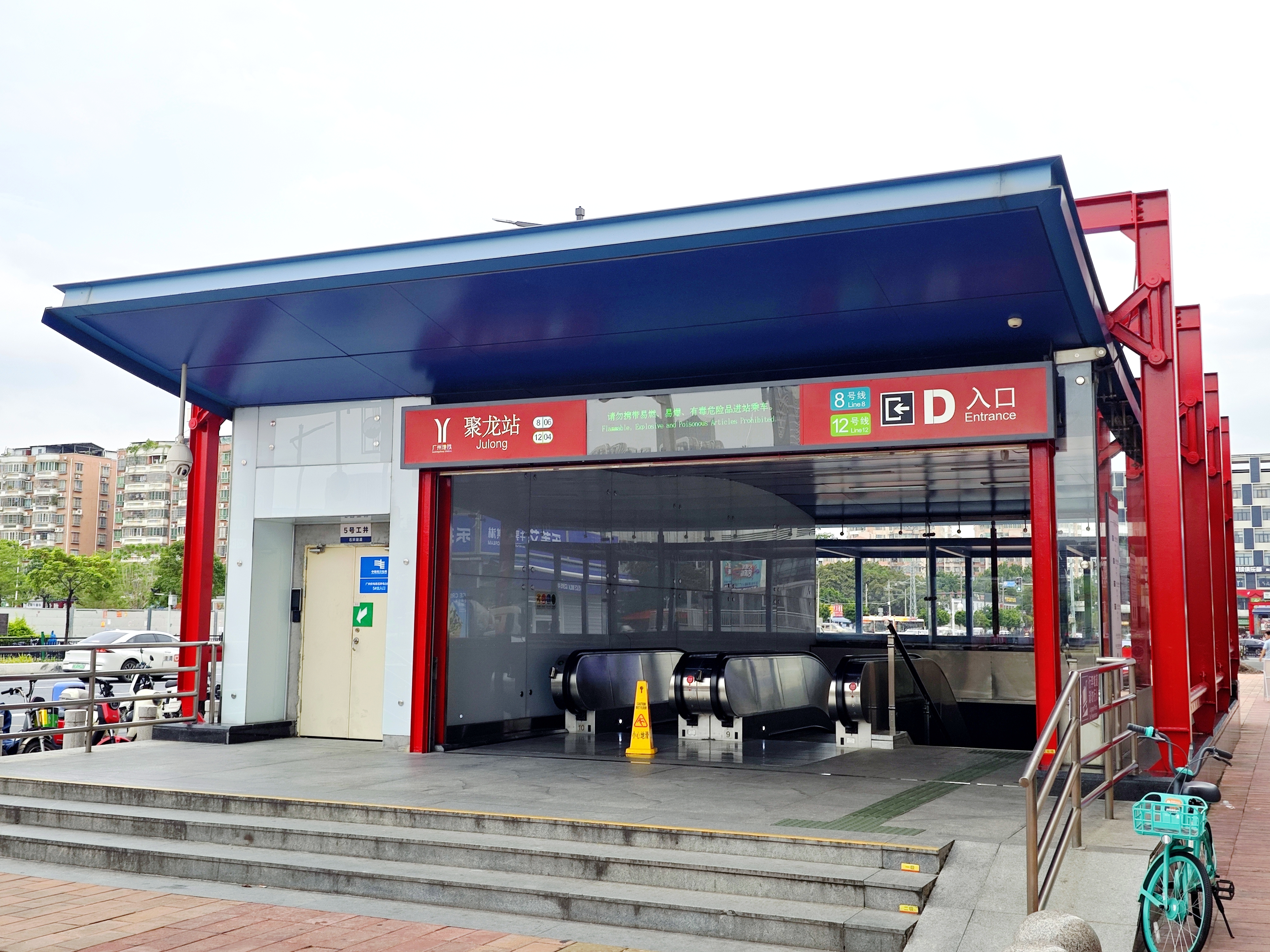
Entrance D

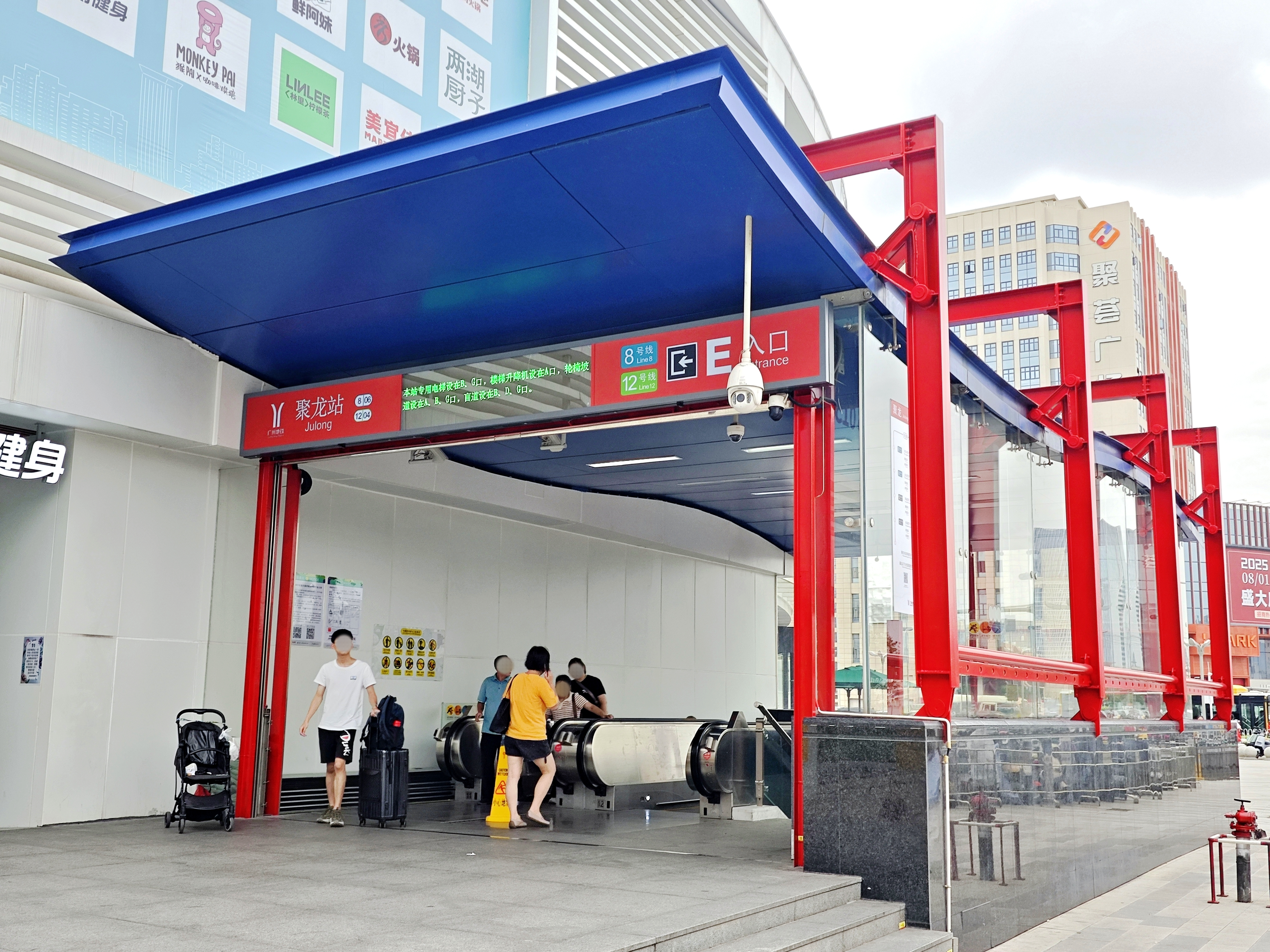
Entrance E

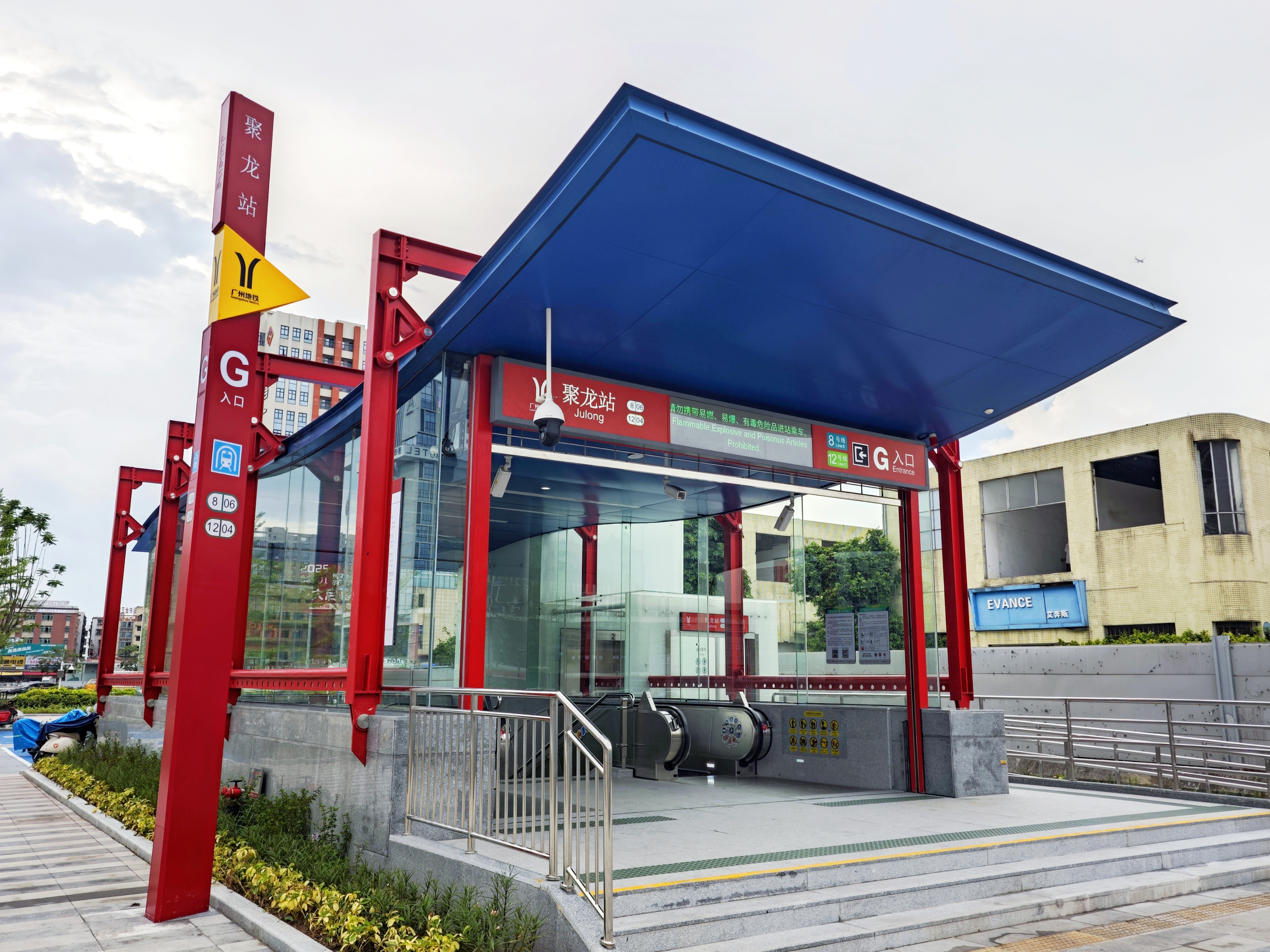
Entrance G

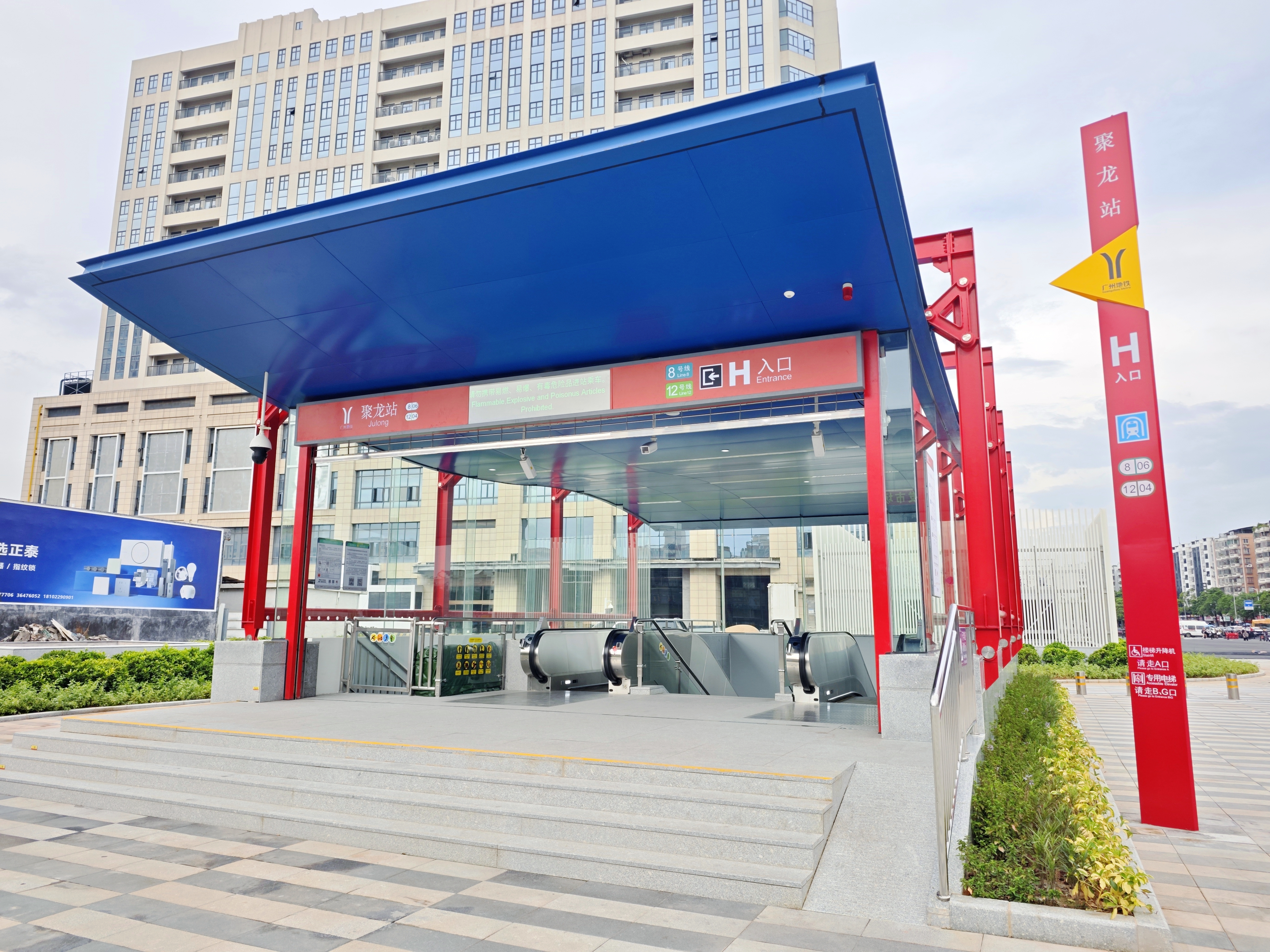
Entrance H

== History ==
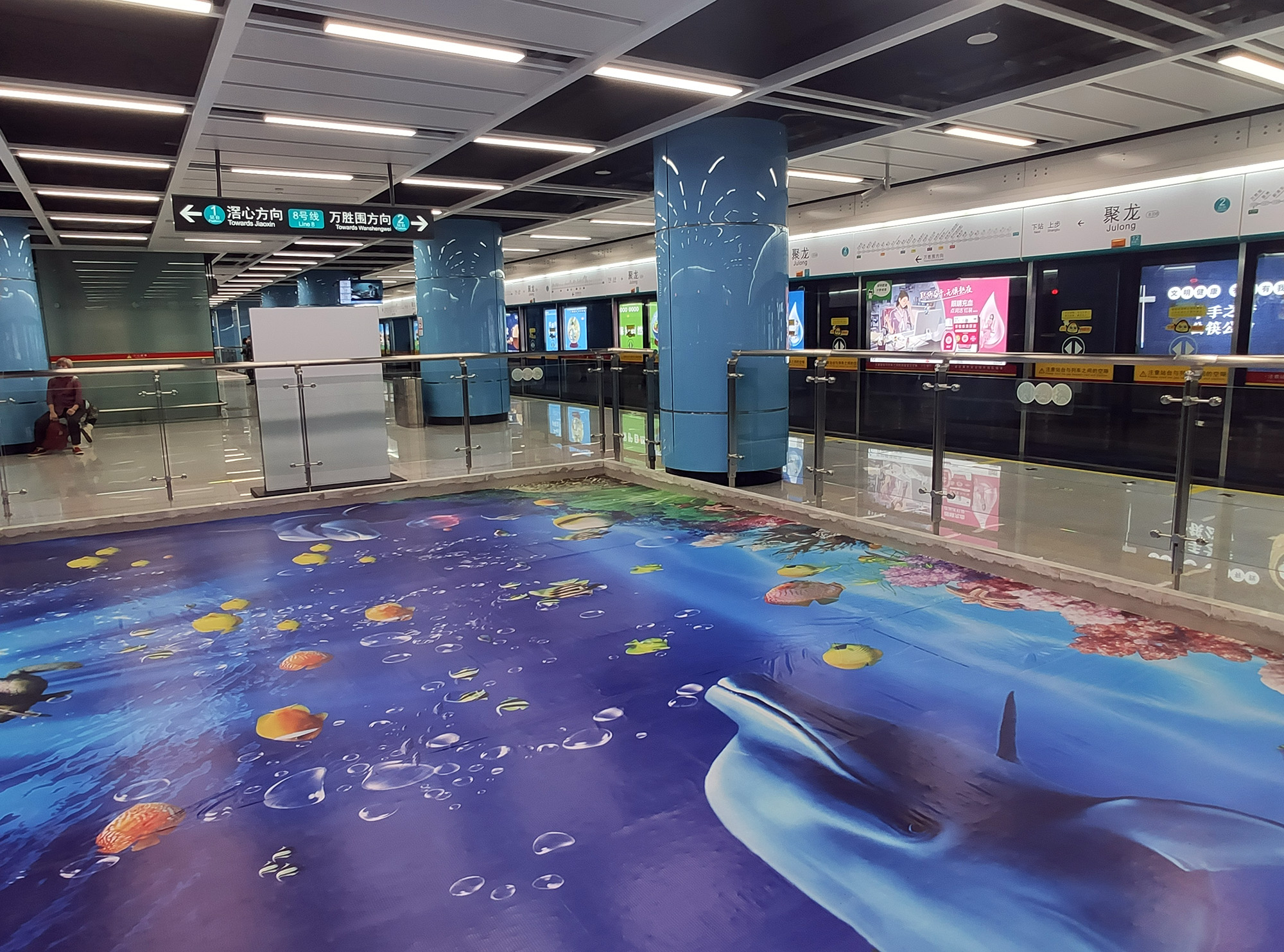
Reserved Transfer Area to Line 12 (2020)

In the 1997 "Guangzhou City Urban Expressways Traffic Line Network Planning Study (Final Report)", the then Line 4 and Line 6 were set up at the current intersection of Xicha Road and Dekang Road with a two-line transfer station. Eventually, most of the section of Line 4 became part of the current Line 8, and Line 6 was converted into the current Line 12, and the station was also named Julong station. On 2 December 2016, the Guangzhou Civil Affairs Bureau announced the initial names of the northern extension of Line 8, and the station was renamed Dekang station. In 2018, the name of Julong station was restored and confirmed. As for the restoration of the original project name as the official station name, some comments believe that the station is next to Julong Village, and "Julong" has been used by locals for many years, whilst "Dekang" comes from the name of one of the roads at the intersection where the station is located. However, the intersection also connects Xicha Road and Shicha Road, and it seems that the name "Dekang" alone seems to be blindly used.

The roof slab of the Line 8 station was sealed on 28 October 2018. The power transmission was successfully carried out in March 2020, and the "three rights" transfer was completed on 30 September the same year. On 26 November 2020, the station opened with the opening of the northern extension of Line 8.

The Line 12 station completed the "three rights" transfer on 24 April 2025 and opened on 29 June the same year.

=== Operational incident ===
During COVID-19 pandemic control rules in 2022, the station was affected by prevention and control measures many times and needed to adjust its services. During the epidemic in April, the station was suspended from 9 to 23 April. During the year-end epidemic, the station was suspended from 21 to 27 November.
