= Tongde station =

Guangzhou Metro Line 8 station

Tongde 同德
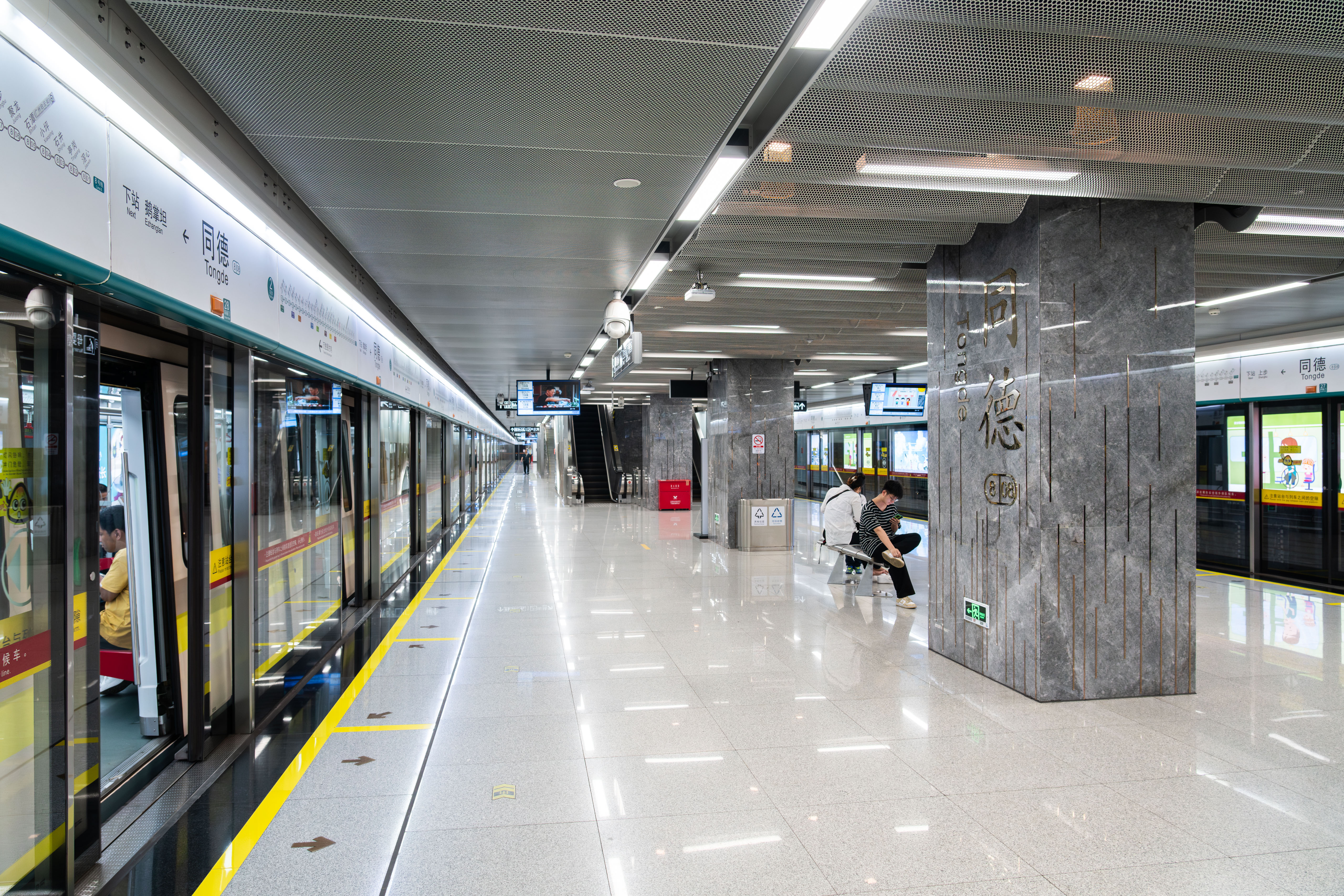
- Platform

Chinese name
- Chinese: 同德站
Transcriptions
Standard Mandarin
- Hanyu Pinyin: Tóngdé Zhàn
Yue: Cantonese
- Yale Romanization: Tùhngdāk Jaahm
- Jyutping: Tung^{4}dak^{1} Zaam^{6}

General information
- Location: Xicha Road (西槎路) east of an elevated section Tongde Subdistrict, Baiyun District, Guangzhou, Guangdong; China
- Coordinates: 23°9′58.9298″N 113°13′46.8001″E
- Operator: Guangzhou Metro Co. Ltd.
- Line: Line 8
- Platforms: 2 (1 island platform)
- Tracks: 2

Construction
- Structure type: Underground
- Accessible: Yes

Other information
- Station code: 808

History
- Opened: 26 November 2020 (5 years ago)

Services
Preceding station	Guangzhou Metro	Following station
Shangbu towards Jiaoxin	Line 8	Ezhangtan towards Wanshengwei
Location

Tongde Station (Chinese: 同德站; pinyin: Tóngdé Zhàn; Cantonese Yale: Tùhngdāk Jaahm) is a station on Line 8 of the Guangzhou Metro, located underground on the east side of an elevated section of Xicha Road in Guangzhou's Baiyun District. The station was opened on 26 November 2020, with the opening of the northern extension of Guangzhou Metro Line 8.

As with other stations on the northern extension of Line 8, the name of this station was published on 2 December 2016.

== Station structure ==
=== Platform layout ===
The station is a two-storey underground station. The ground level is the exit, and it is surrounded by Xicha Road elevated section, North Circular Ring Road, Qiaode Garden and other nearby buildings. The first floor is the concourse, and the second floor is the platform for Line 8.

Like the stations in the northern extension of Line 8, this station is decorated in glass curtain panels, while the pillars are decorated with brownish-grey granite with metal reflective strips. The color of the station is white.

G	-	Exits A, B, C
L1; Concourse	Concourse	Ticket Machines, Customer Service, Shops, Police Station, Security Facilities
L2; Platforms	Platform 1	8 towards Jiaoxin (Shangbu)
L2; Platforms	Island platform, doors will open on the left (Toilets, Nursery)
L2; Platforms	Platform 2	8 towards Wanshengwei (Ezhangtan)

=== Concourse ===
The concourse is equipped with ticket machines and a customer service center. There is also a 7-Eleven convenience store and self-service facilities like automatic vending machines. There are elevators, escalators and stairs in the fare-paid area for passengers to access the platform.

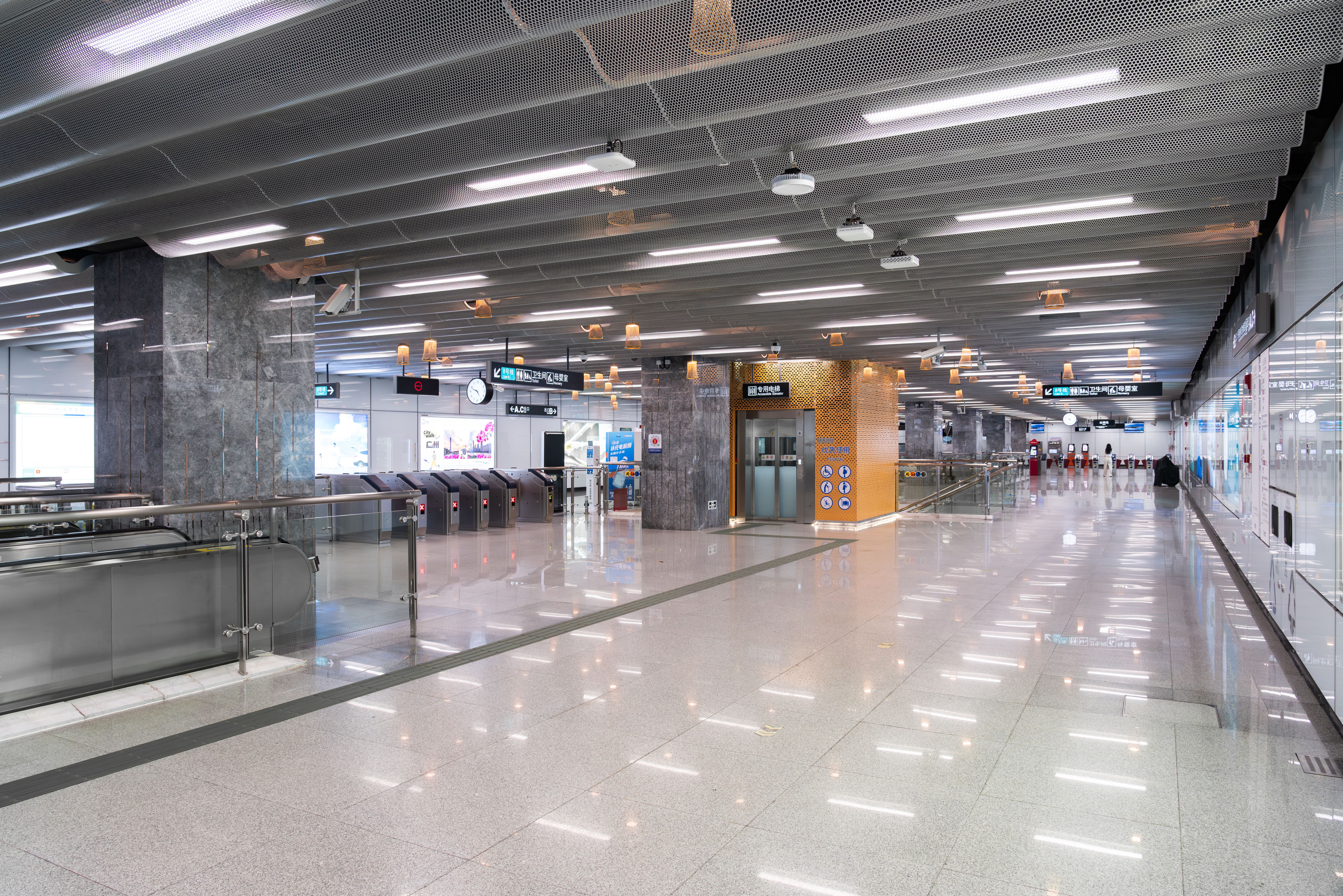
Concourse

=== Platform ===
The station has an island platform under an elevated section of Xicha Road. Toilets and a nursery room are located at the northern end of the platform towards Shangbu.

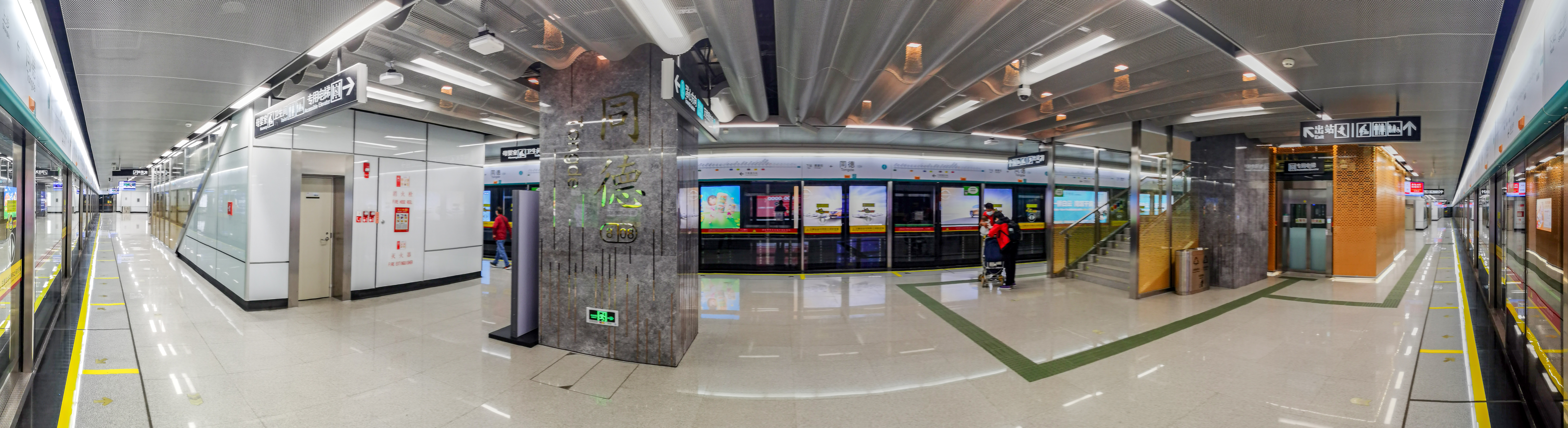
Platform 1 panorama

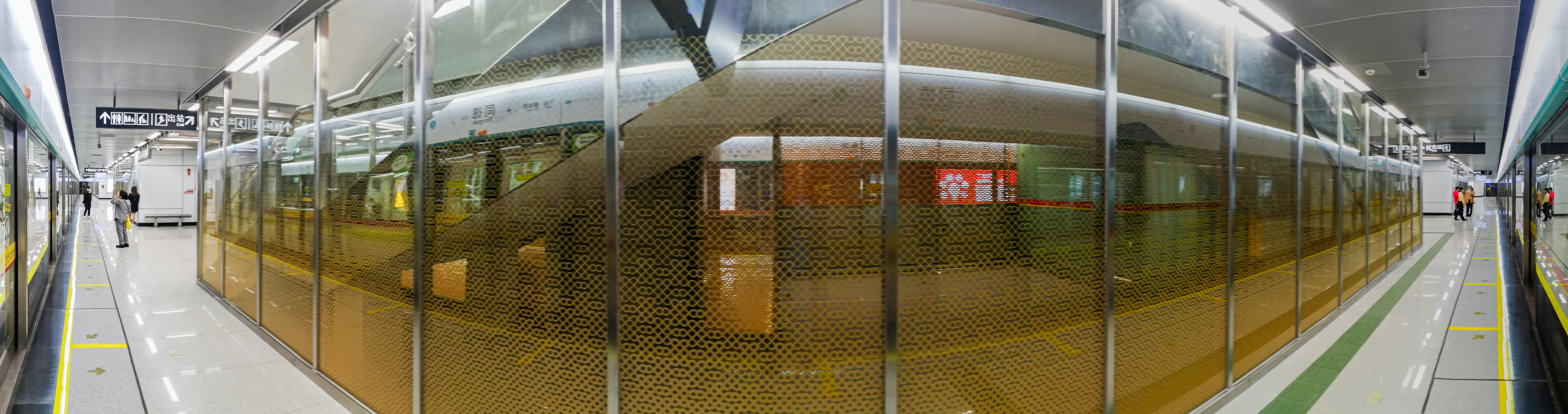
Platform 2 panorama

=== Entrances/exits ===
The station has 3 points of entry/exit, with Exit C being accessible via elevator.

- A: Xicha Road
- B: Xicha Road
- C: Xicha Road
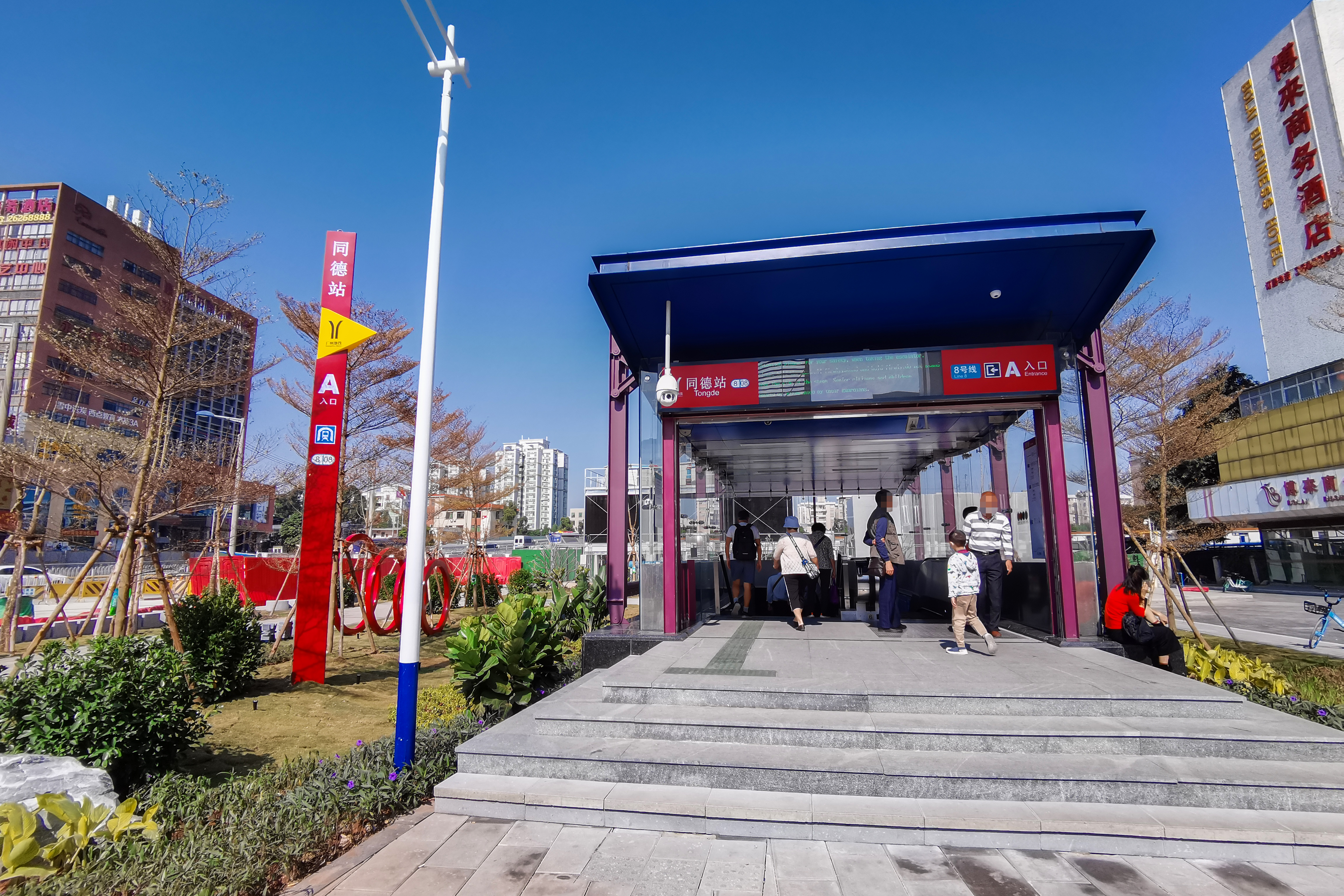
Entrance A

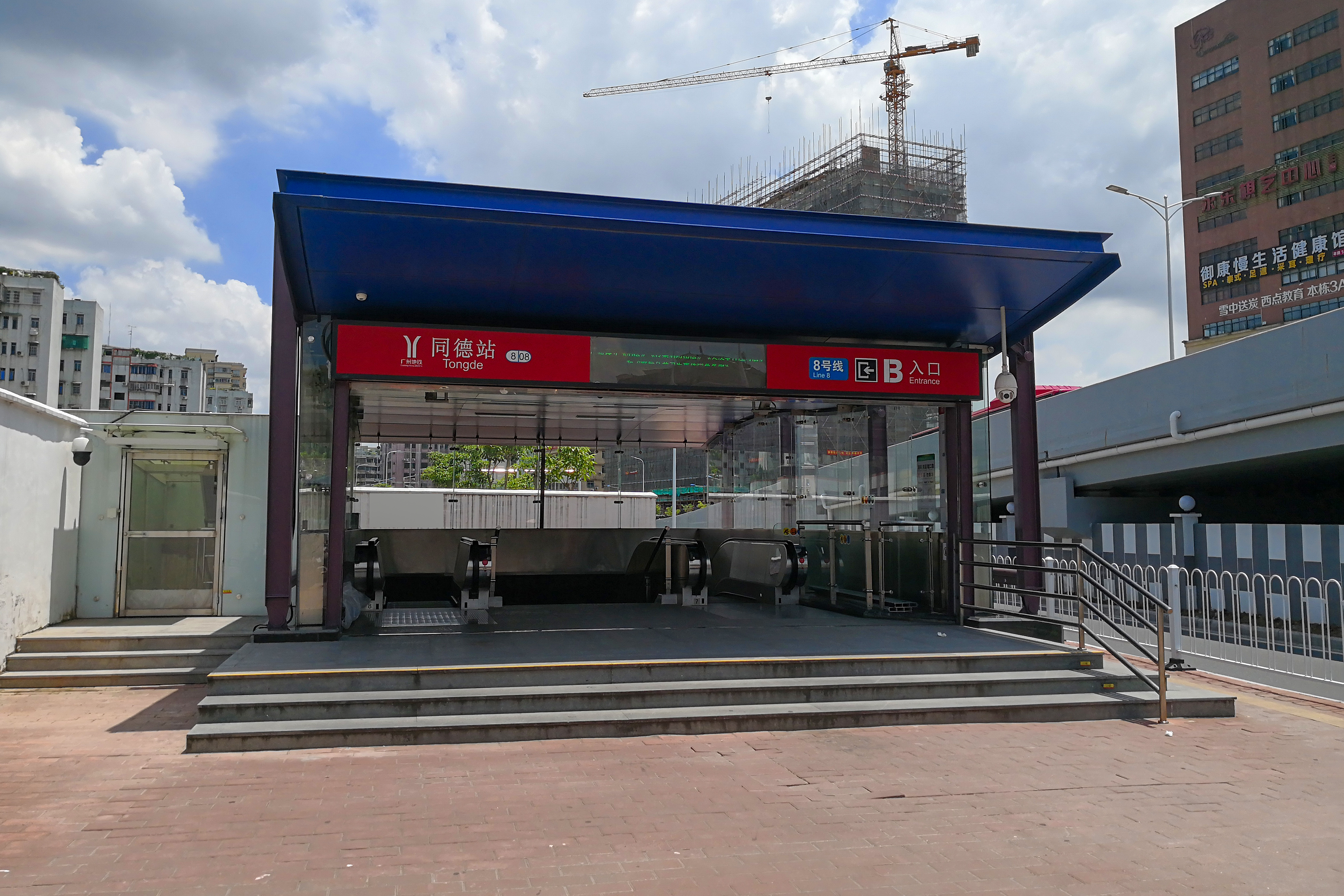
Entrance B

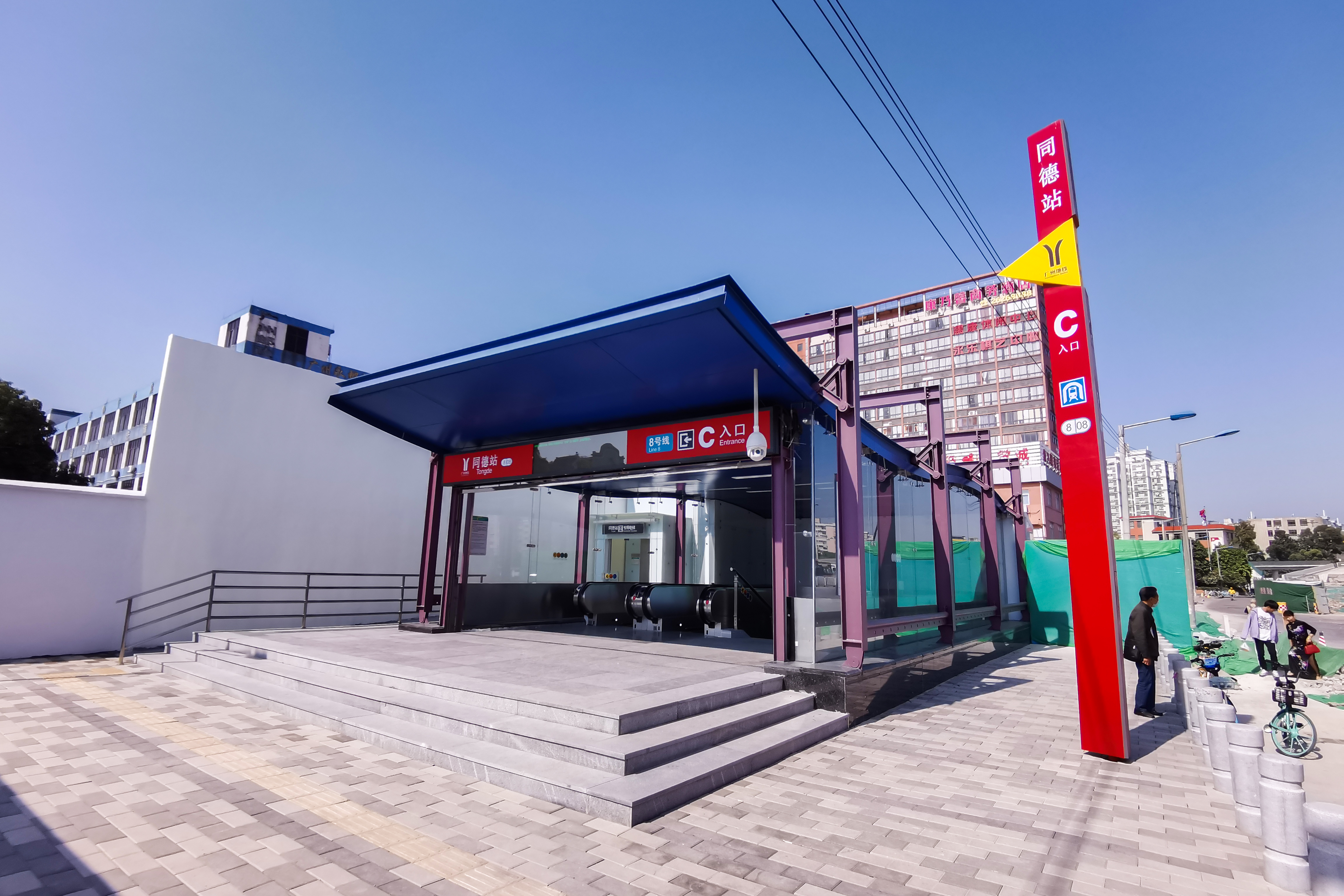
Entrance C

== History ==
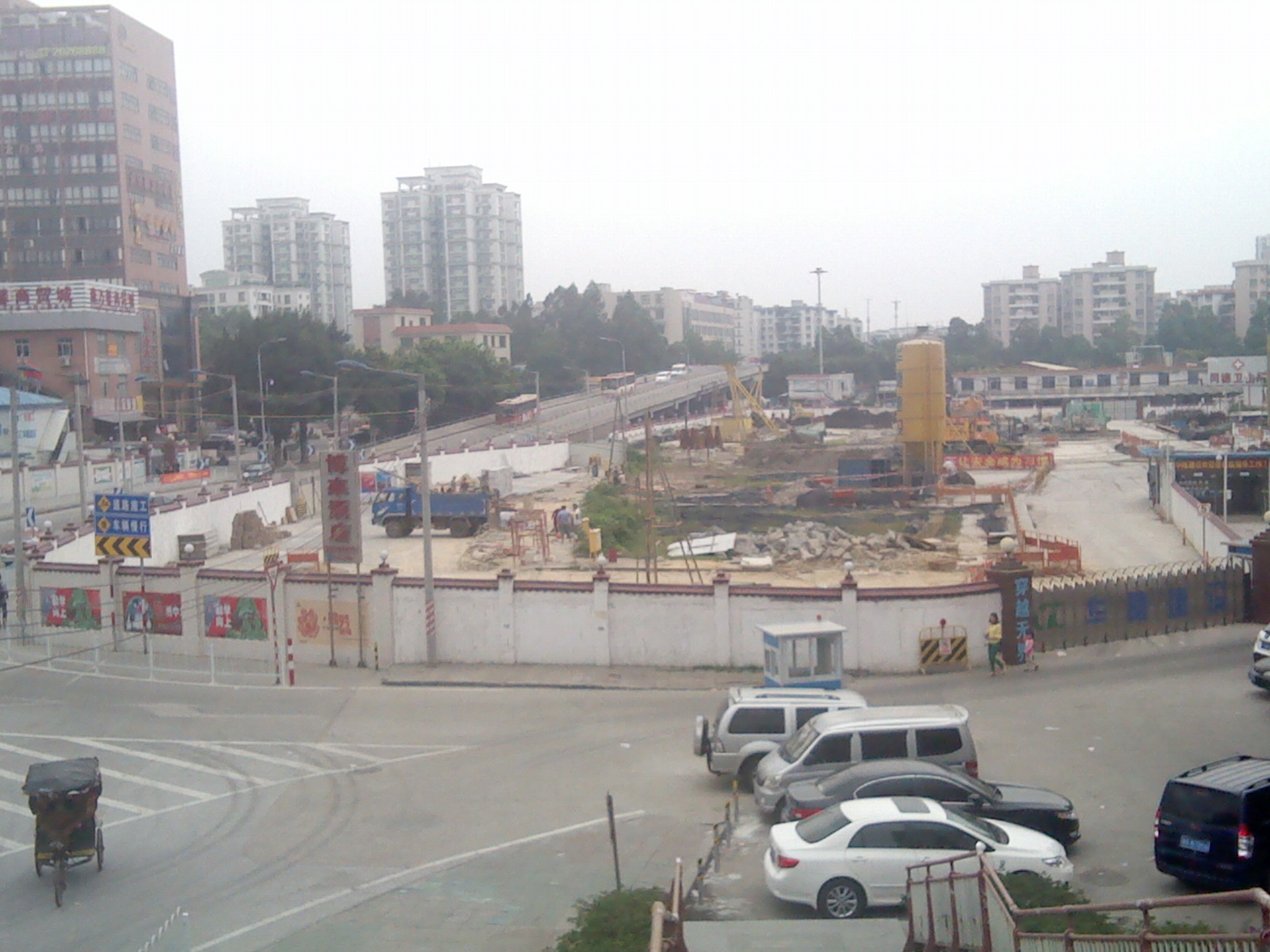
Construction site (April 2015)

In 1997, in the "Guangzhou City Urban Expressway, Traffic Network Planning Research (Final Report)", the then Line 4 set up this station. In the 2003 plan, most of the section of the line became part of the current Line 8, and eventually the station was designated as Tongdewei station of the northern extension of Line 8.

Construction of the station started after the Spring Festival of 2014 and is the first station to officially enter construction on the northern extension of Line 8.

In August 2018, the site was named Tongde station. The name change was supported by the majority of citizens, with some netizens joking that Tongdewei "finally broke through and was no longer 'surrounded'". Some scholars have also pointed out that "Tongde" has been used in the area for decades, and that "Tongdewei" was a term only used in the development of Tongde in the 1990s, and that the change back to the original name "Tongde" reflects both local history and urban development.

The roof slab of the station was sealed on 12 May 2018. The station successfully transmitted power in March 2020 and completed the "three rights" transfer on 31 July the same year.

On 26 November 2020, the station opened with the opening of the northern extension of Line 8.

During COVID-19 pandemic control rules in 2022, the station was affected by prevention and control measures many times and needed to adjust its services. During the epidemic in April, the station was suspended from 20:00 on 15 April to 15:00 on 25 April, and Exit A was additionally closed until 10:00 on 26 April. During the year-end epidemic, the station was suspended from 21 to 27 November.
