= Xicun station =

Guangzhou Metro station

Coordinates: 23.1418°N 113.2417°E

Xicun 西村
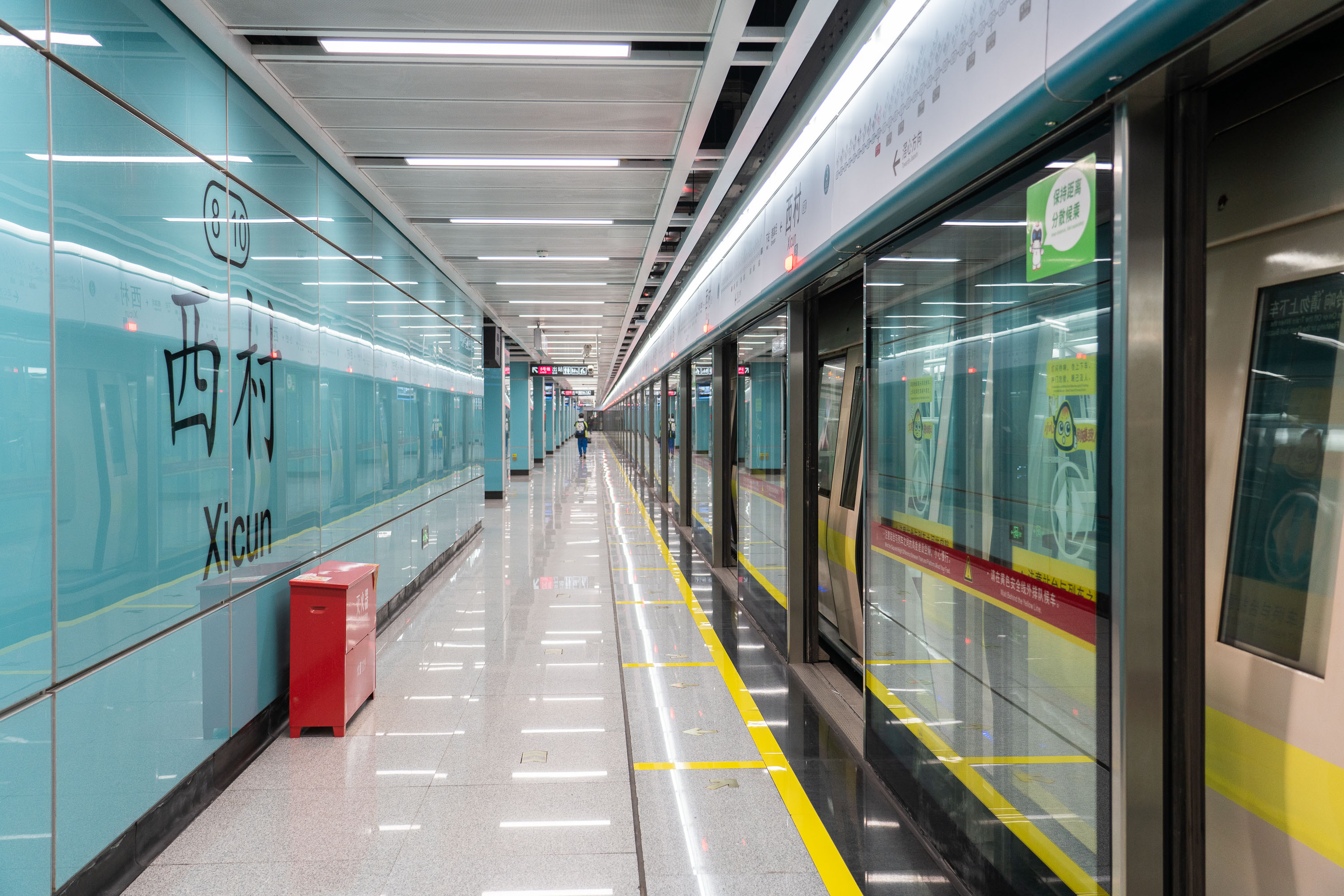
- Line 8 northbound platform

Chinese name
- Chinese: 西村站
- Literal meaning: West Village Station
Transcriptions
Standard Mandarin
- Hanyu Pinyin: Xīcūn Zhàn
Yue: Cantonese
- Yale Romanization: Sāichyūn Jaahm
- Jyutping: Sai^{1}cyun^{4} Zaam^{6}

General information
- Location: Liwan District, Guangzhou, Guangdong; China
- Operated by: Guangzhou Metro Co. Ltd.
- Lines: Line 5 Line 8
- Platforms: 4 (1 split island platform and 1 island platform)
- Tracks: 4

Construction
- Structure type: Underground
- Accessible: Yes

Other information
- Station code: 505; 810

History
- Opened: 28 December 2009; 16 years ago (Line 5); 28 December 2022; 3 years ago (Line 8)

Services
Preceding station	Guangzhou Metro	Following station
Xichang towards Jiaokou	Line 5	Guangzhou Railway Station towards Huangpu New Port
Ezhangtan towards Jiaoxin	Line 8	Caihong Bridge towards Wanshengwei
Location

Xicun Station (Chinese: 西村站; Cantonese Yale: Sāichyūn Jaahm) is an interchange station between Line 5 and Line 8 of the Guangzhou Metro. It is located under the junction of Huanshi Road West (环市西路) and Xizeng Road (西增路) in the Liwan District. Huanshi Road West is one of the main shopping areas for shoes in Guangzhou. The station opened on 28 December 2009.

== Station layout ==
L1; Concourse	Lobby	Ticket Machines, Customer Service, Shops, Police Station, Safety Facilities
L2; Platforms	Platform 3	8 towards Jiaoxin (Ezhangtan)
L2; Platforms	Island platform, doors will open on the left
L2; Platforms	Platform 4	8 towards Wanshengwei (Caihongqiao)
L3; Platforms	Platform 2	5 towards Jiaokou (Xichang)
L3; Platforms	Side platform, doors will open on the left
L3; Platforms	Pedestrian Passageway	Passage linking Line 5 platforms
L3; Platforms	Side platform, doors will open on the left
L3; Platforms	Platform 1	5 towards Huangpu New Port (Guangzhou Railway Station)

== Gallery ==
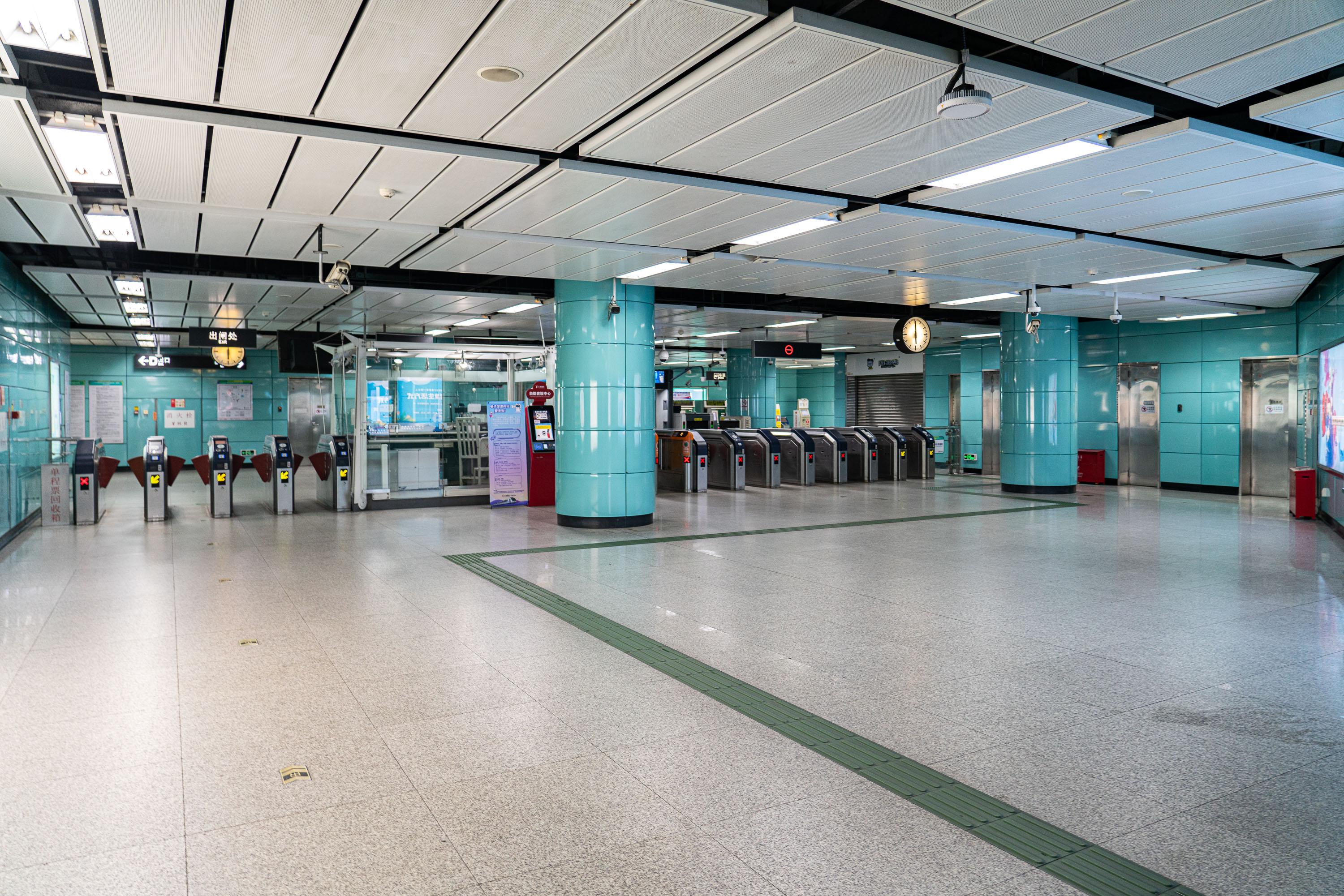
Line 5 north concourse

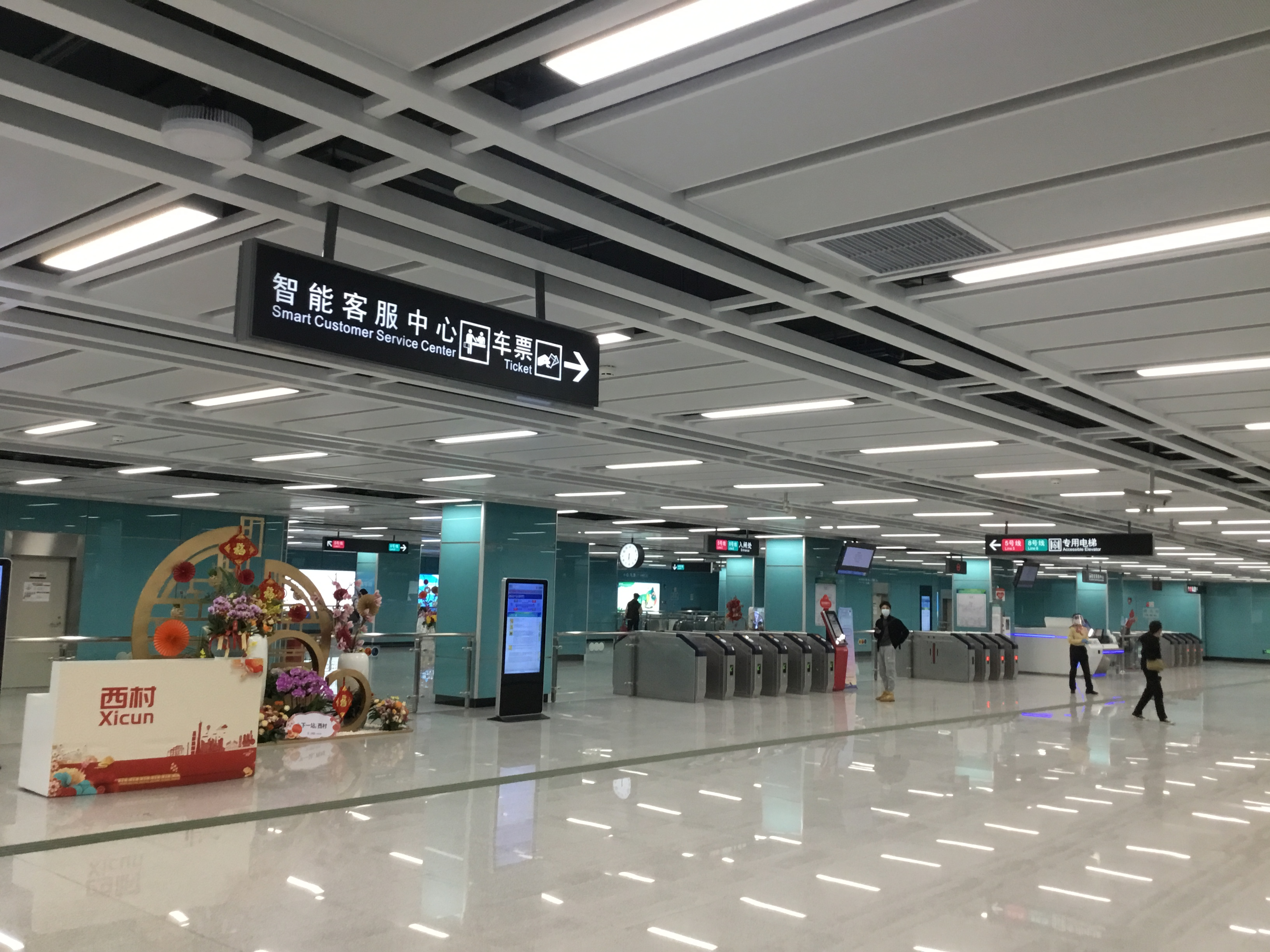
Line 8 south concourse

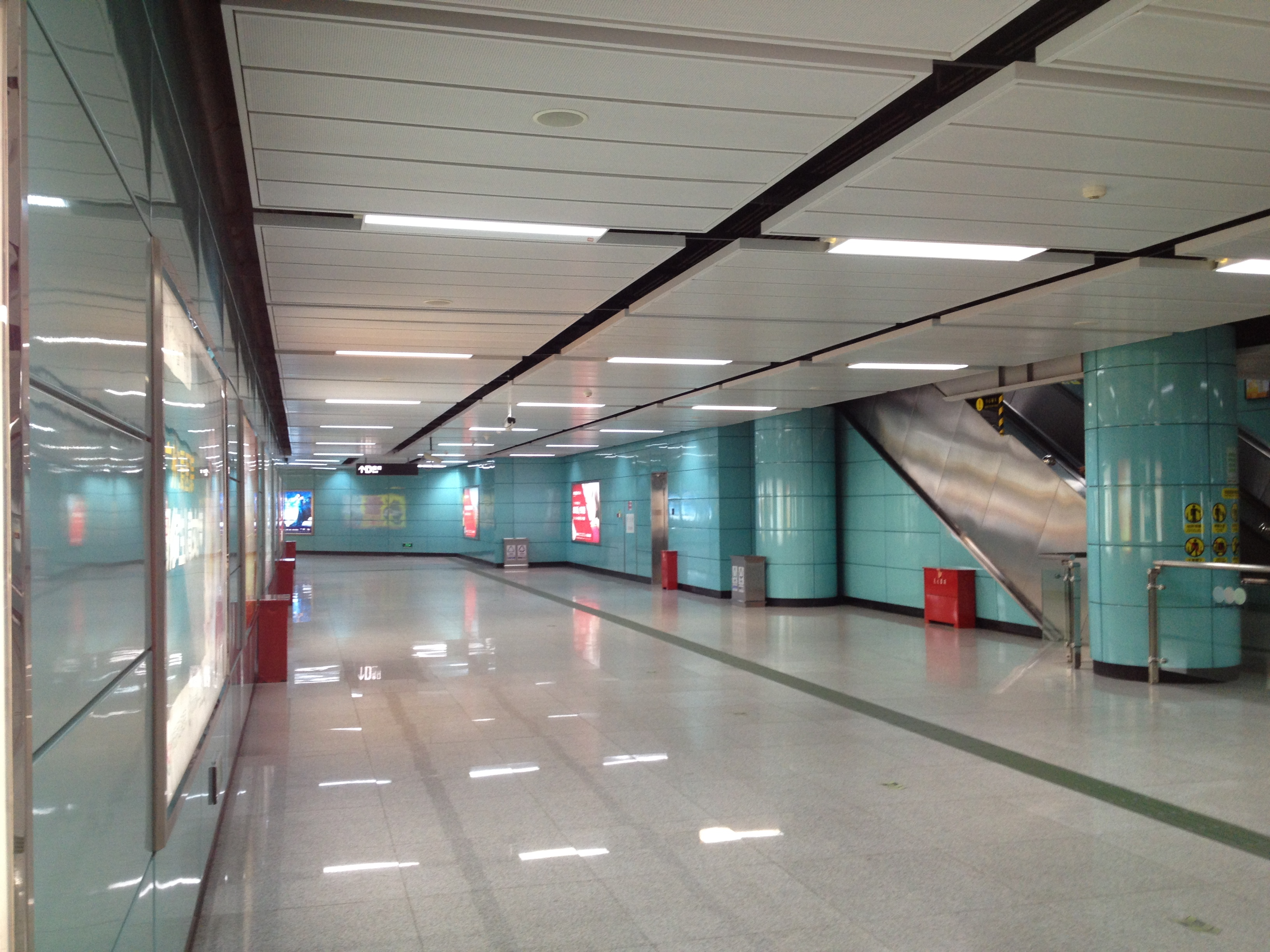
North and south concourse passageway
