= Tongdewei =

City in Guangdong, China

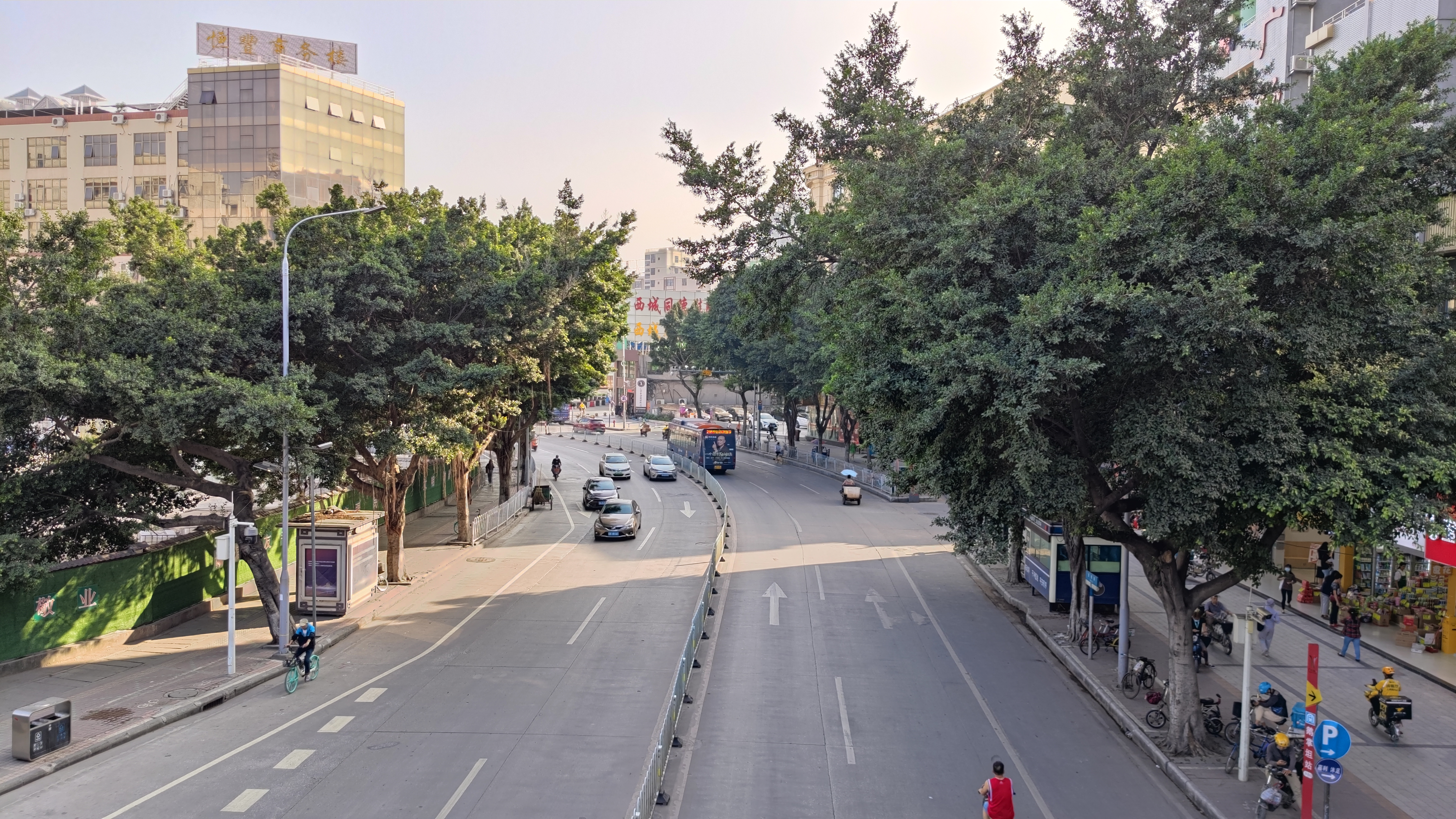
Xicha Road that connect Tongdewei to the city center.

Tongdewei (simplified Chinese: 同德围; traditional Chinese: 同德圍; Jyutping: tung4 dak2 wai4) is located in Tongde Subdistrict, Baiyun District, Guangzhou, Guangdong, China. It covers an area of 3.59 square kilometers. It is named Tongdewei because it is surrounded by tributaries of the Shijing River and the Pearl River. Inhabited by 300,000 residents, Tongdewei was regarded as a besieged city with only Xiwan Road and Xicha Road (the same road but different sections) running north-south.

Historically, Tongdewei included the five villages of Ezhang, Tianxin, Yuexi, Shangbu, and Hengjiao. At the beginning of the 20th century, the developed waterway transportation attracted many merchants from cities and towns around Guangzhou to live here. In 1990, the Guangzhou Municipal People's Government planned Tongdewei as a large-scale affordable housing area. In 1996, tens of thousands of households from the old city were resettled here due to the construction of metro and the Inner Ring Road. In 1998, a new teacher village was built. As Tongdewei's population increased, its security, medical care, education, and other public services failed to meet the growing demands, and the disparities between Tongdewei and the city center widened. The dilemma was first reported on Guangzhou Television's main program News Day in 2005, and it entered media coverage again at the end of 2007.

On January 19, 2010, Shangbu Bridge, the only bridge that crossed the Beihuan Expressway on Xicha Road, was crashed its bridge pier by a boat and closed to the public. 21 bus lines were cut off and vehicles could not enter or exit Tongdewei. The travel of residents in the area was blocked. Shangbu Bridge resumed traffic after a 26-day interruption.

On January 21, 2012, Tongkang Road, connecting Xicha Road and Zengcha Road, was successfully opened to traffic before the Spring Festival. The traffic environment in Tongdewei, which has received much attention, could be greatly improved. The Tongdewei South-North Elevated Road was opened on December 28, 2014, to tackle the traffic congestion caused by the bottleneck in the Tongdewei section of Zengcha Road and Shangbu Bridge.

Guangzhou Metro Line 8 has been extended on November 26, 2020 and will pass through the entire Tongdewei area from north to south with multiple stations. It is also expected to solve the traffic problem of local residents in and out.
