= Tongde Subdistrict =

Subdistrict in Guangzhou, People's Republic of China

Tongde Subdistrict 同德街道
- Subdistrict
- Interactive map of Tongde Subdistrict
- Coordinates: 23°10′12″N 113°13′41″E
- Country: People's Republic of China
- Province: Guangdong
- Sub-provincial city: Guangzhou
- District: Baiyun
- Time zone: UTC+8 (China Standard Time)

Tongde Subdistrict (Chinese: 同德街道; pinyin: Tóngdé Jiēdào; Jyutping: tung^{4} dak^{1} gaai^{1} dou^{6}) is a subdistrict of Baiyun District, Guangzhou, People's Republic of China. As of 2020, it has 20 residential communities (社区) under its administration.

== See also ==
- Tongdewei
- List of township-level divisions of Guangdong
