= Baiyun Airport South railway station =

Guangdong Intercity railway station in Guangzhou, China

Baiyun Airport South 白云机场南
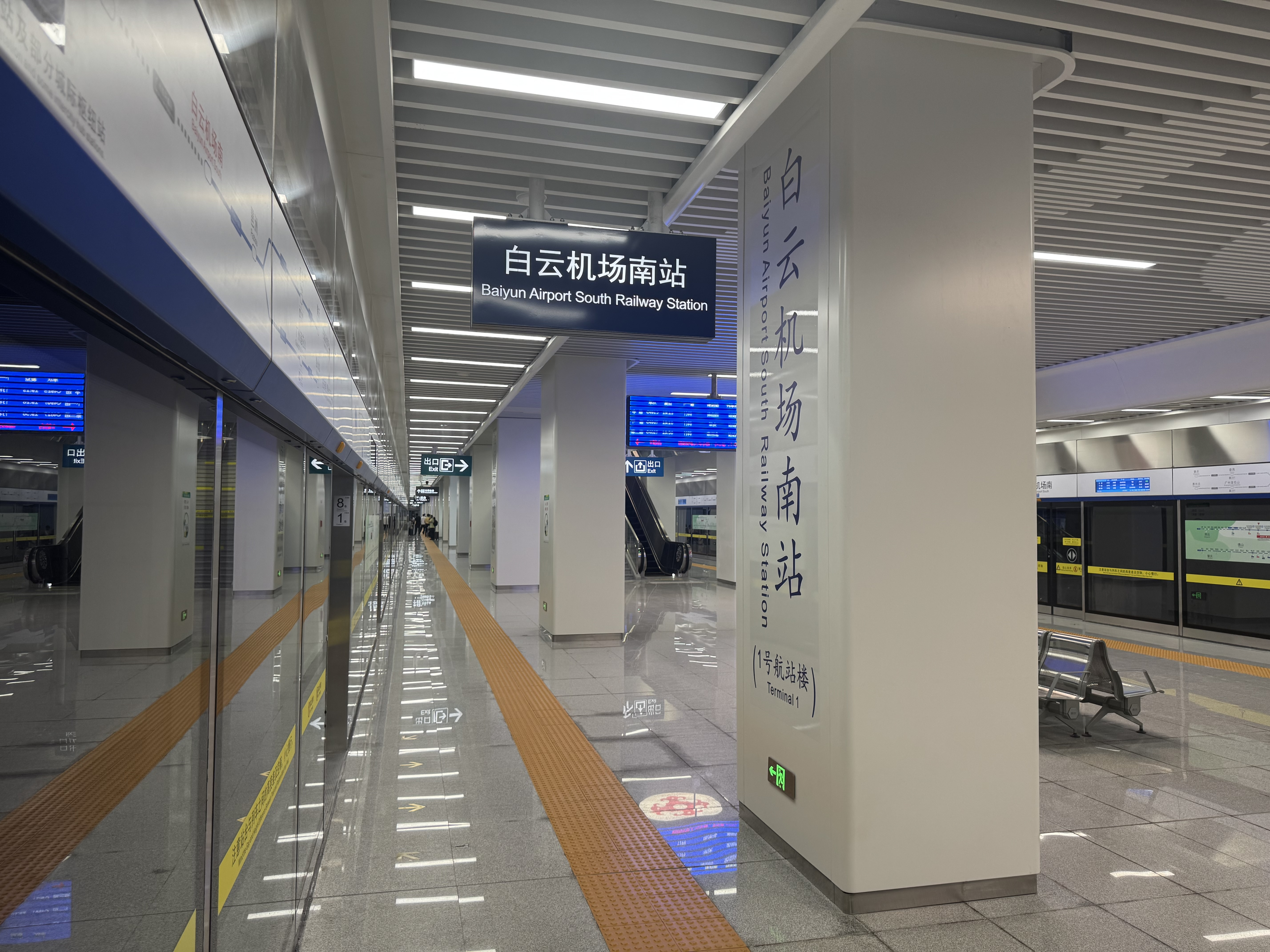
- Platform

Chinese name
- Simplified Chinese: 白云机场南站
- Traditional Chinese: 白雲機場南站
Transcriptions
Standard Mandarin
- Hanyu Pinyin: Báiyún Jīchǎng Nán Zhàn
Yue: Cantonese
- Yale Romanization: Baahk'wàhn Gēichèuhng Nàahm Jaahm
- Jyutping: Baak^{6}wan^{4} Gei^{1}coeng^{4} Naam^{4} Zaam^{6}

General information
- Location: West side of the east connecting building of Guangzhou Baiyun International Airport Terminal 1 Huadong, Huadu District, Guangzhou, Guangdong; China
- Coordinates: 23°23′8.394″N 113°17′52.476″E
- Owner: Pearl River Delta Metropolitan Region intercity railway
- Operator: Guangdong Intercity
- Line: Guangzhou East Ring intercity railway
- Platforms: 2 (1 island platform)
- Tracks: 2
- Connections: Guangzhou Baiyun International Airport (Terminal 1); 3 Airport South (Terminal 1)

Construction
- Structure type: Underground
- Accessible: Yes

Other information
- Station code: BNA (Pinyin: BYN)

History
- Opened: 29 September 2025 (10 months ago)
- Closed: 7 May 2026 (3 months ago) (Due to renovation of Terminal 1)

Services
Preceding station	Pearl River Delta Metropolitan Region Intercity Railway	Following station
Service suspended
Baiyun Airport North towards Huadu	Guangzhou East Ring intercity railway	Baiyun Airport East towards Panyu
Transfer at Airport South (Terminal 1)
Preceding station	Guangzhou Metro	Following station
Gaozeng towards Haibang	Line 3 transfer at Airport South (Terminal 1)	Airport North (Terminal 2) towards Airport North (Terminal 2) or Tianhe Coach Terminal
Location

Baiyun Airport South railway station (Chinese: 白云机场南站; pinyin: Báiyún Jīchǎng Nán Zhàn; Cantonese Yale: Baahk'wàhn Gēichèuhng Nàahm Jaahm) is a railway station on Guangzhou East Ring intercity railway located in Huadu District, Guangzhou, Guangdong, China. It is located underground between the east connecting building and the P2 parking lot of Terminal 1 of Guangzhou Baiyun International Airport. It opened on 29 September 2025.

From 7 May 2026, the station will be temporarily closed and will become a non-stopping station due to Terminal 1 of Baiyun Airport being temporarily closed from 2:00 am on 7 May 2026 for the upgrading of facilities.

== Features ==
The station has an underground island platform.

=== Entrances/exits ===
The station has 4 points of entry/exit, lettered A-D. Currently only Exits A and B are open, both are located on Airport Avenue East.

- A: Airport Avenue East
- B: Airport Avenue East
- ~~C~~: (Not open)
- ~~D~~: (Not open)
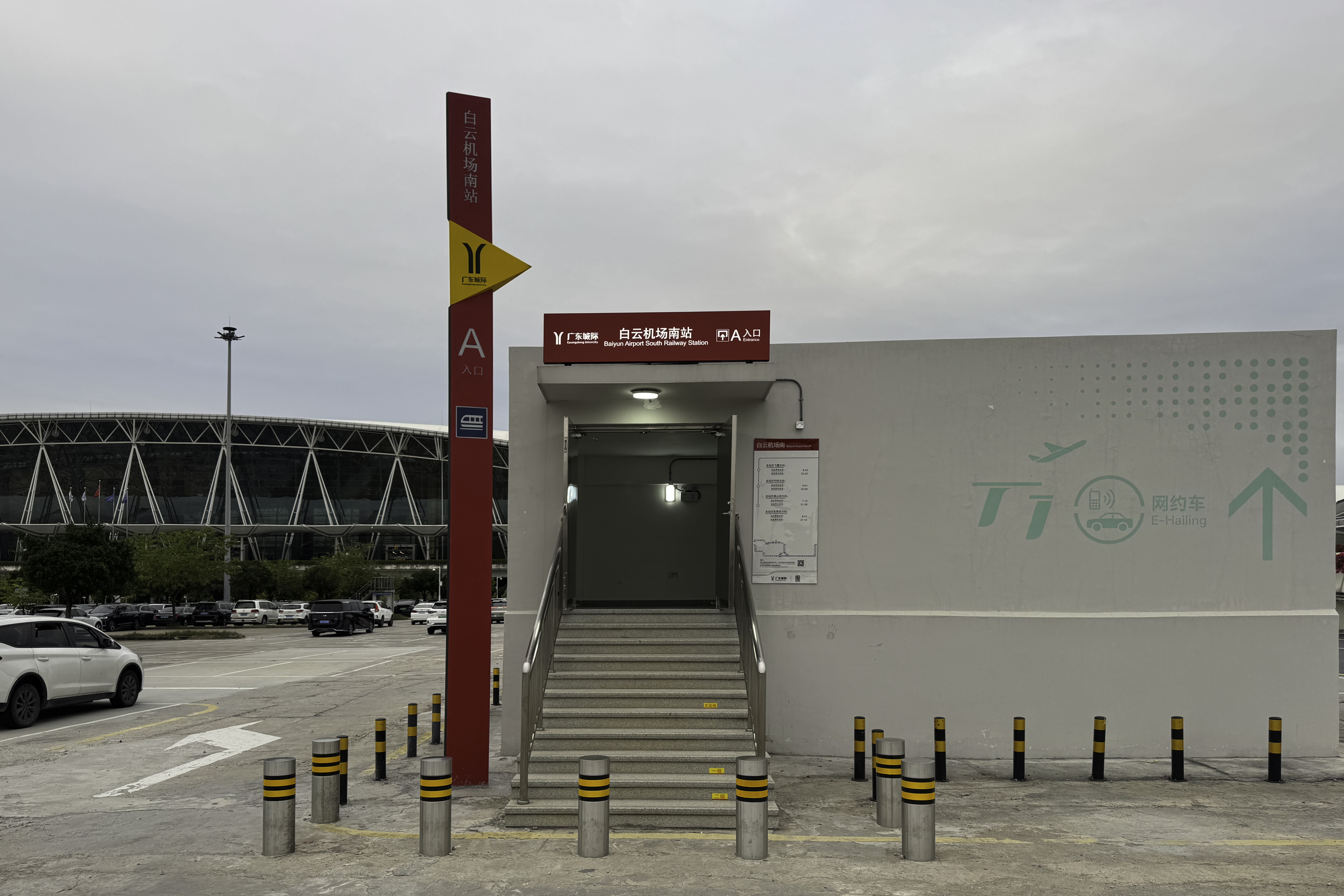
Entrance A

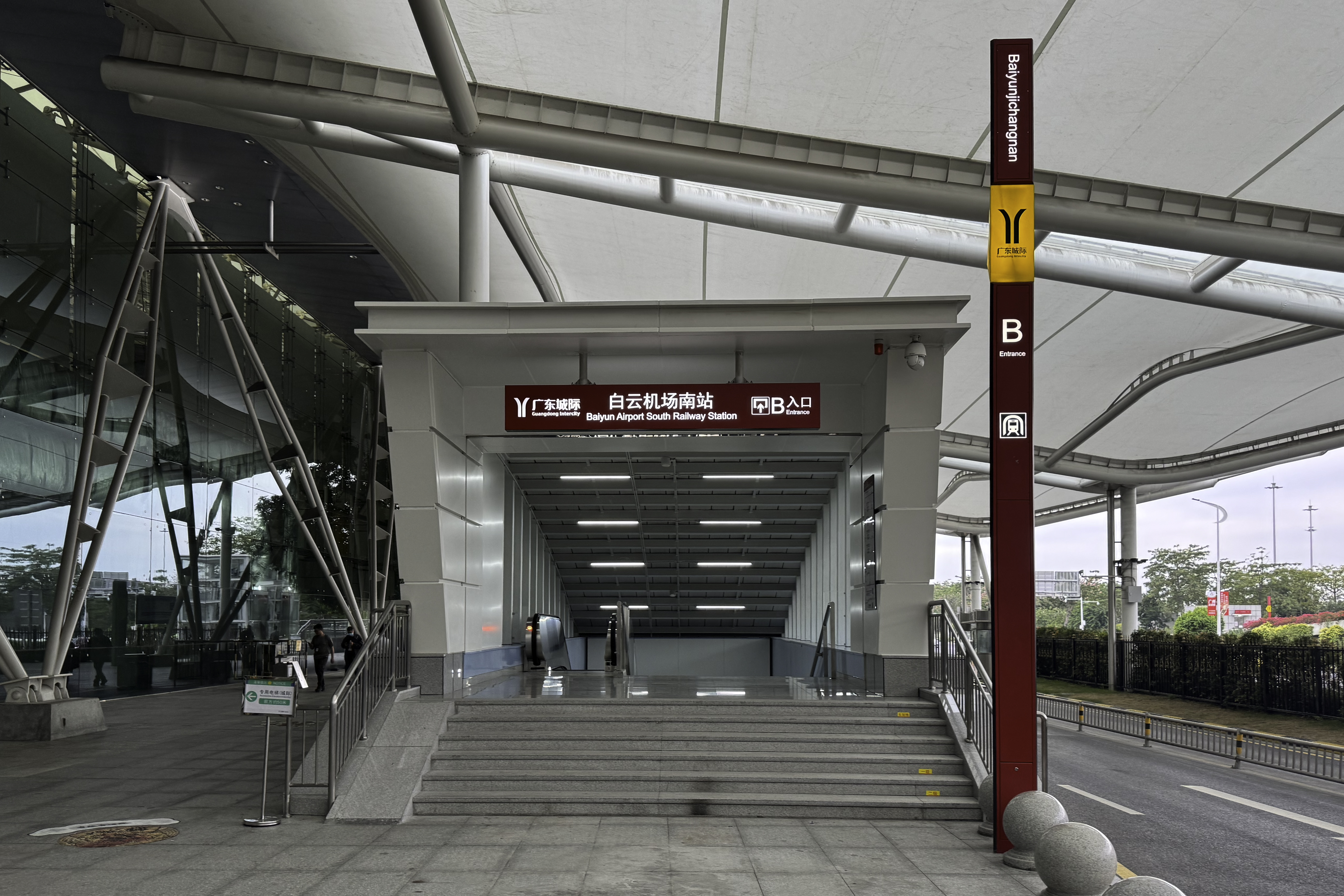
Entrance B

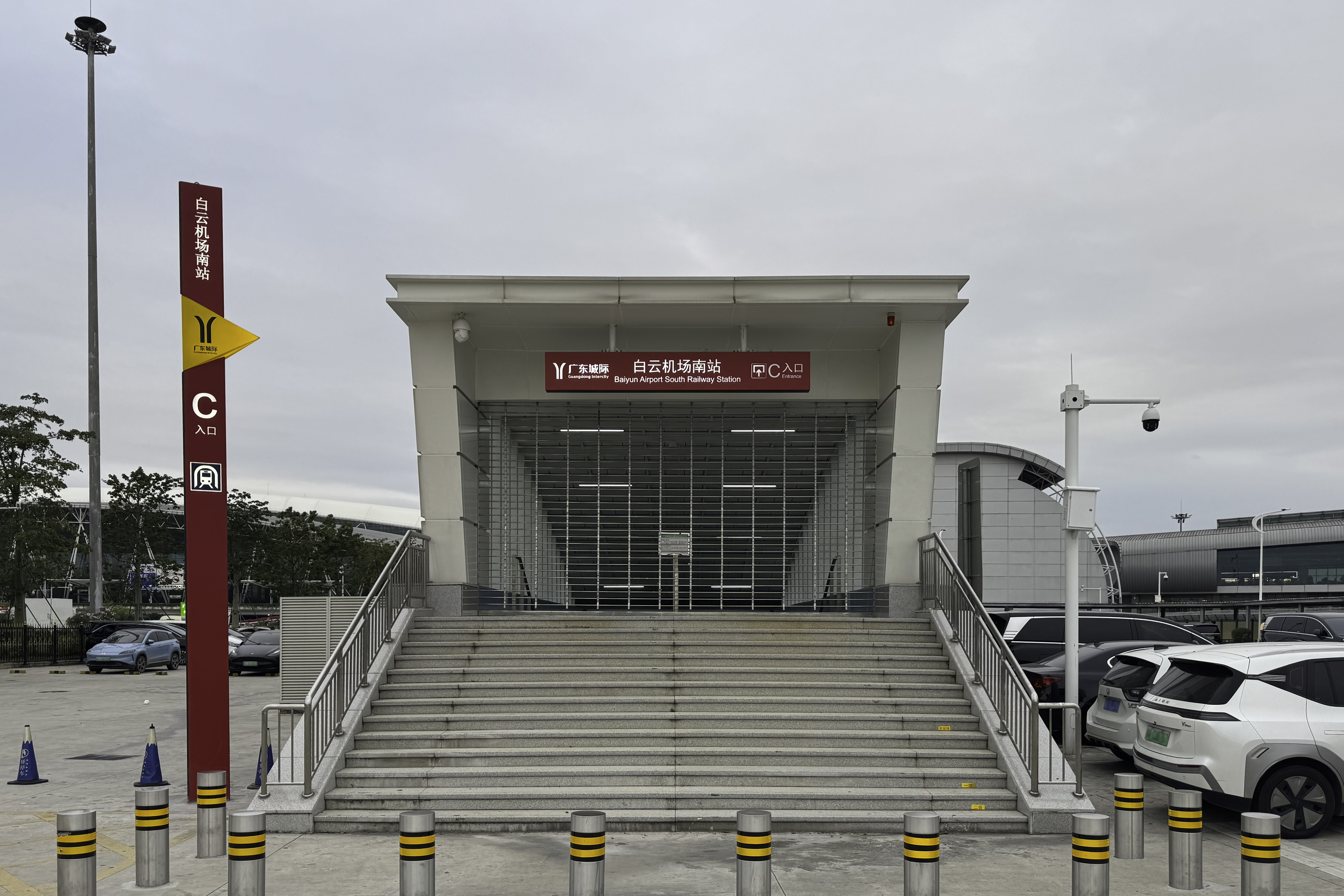
Entrance C (not open)

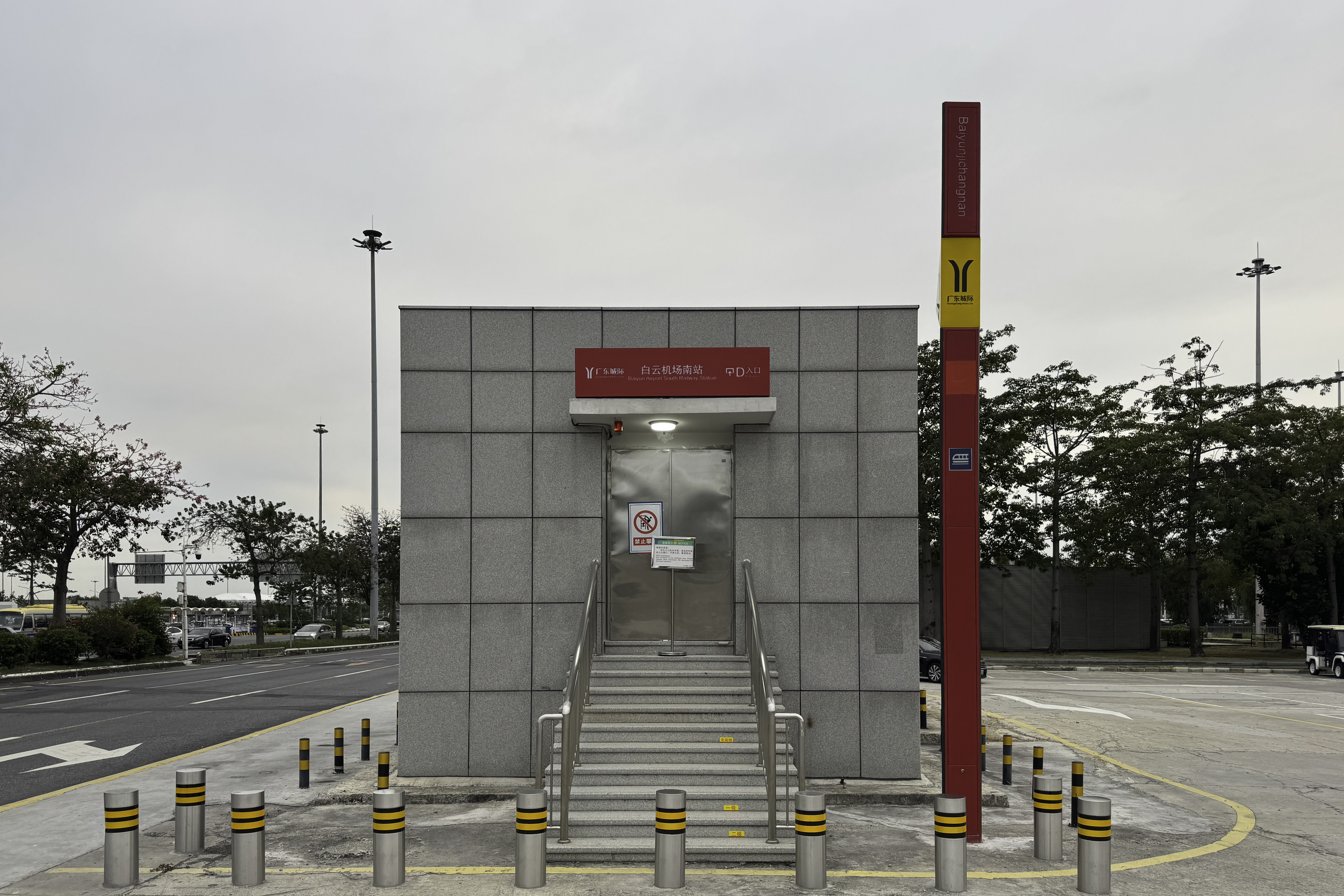
Entrance D (not open)

== History ==
The station was called Airport Terminal 1 station during the planning and construction phase. It was renamed to Baiyun Airport South station on 2 February 2021.

The station began construction on 26 November 2018, and construction of the main structure began on 14 January 2020. The station structure topped out on 18 January 2022.

On 29 September 2025, the station opened.

== Transfer ==
The station provides interchange to Guangzhou Metro Line 3, and via passage towards the northern extension of Line 22, known as the Fangbai Intercity.

== Gallery ==
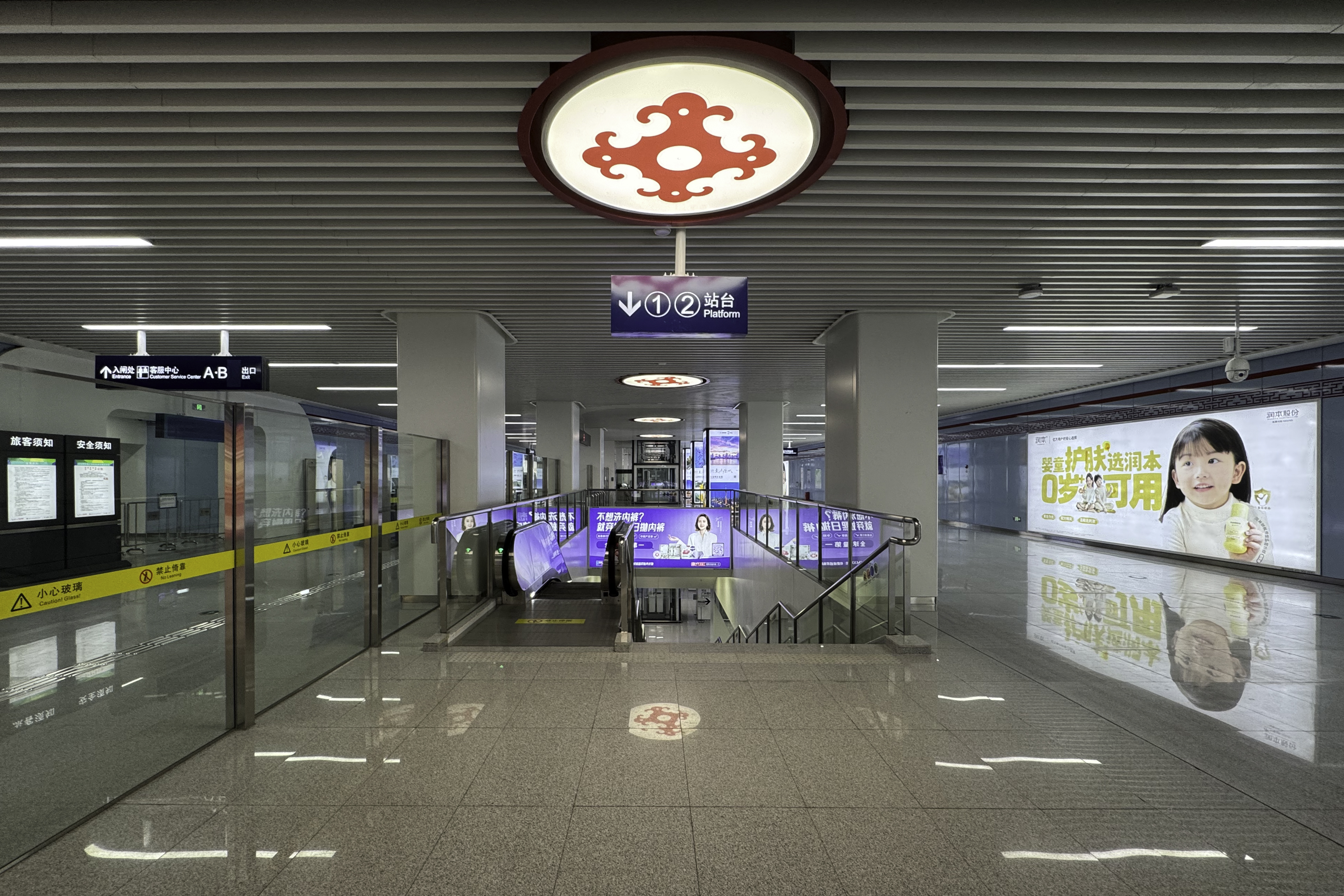
Concourse

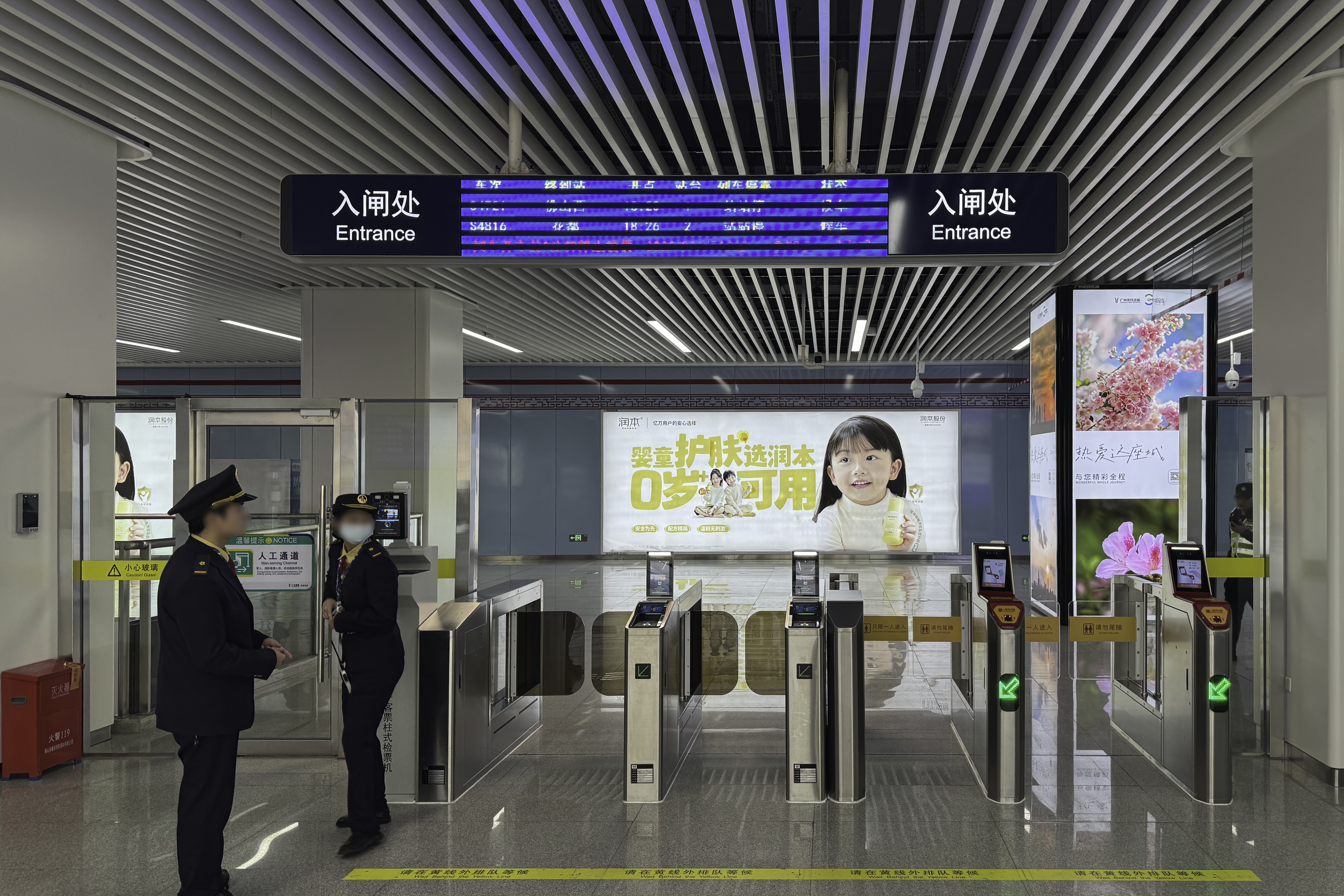
Entry faregates
