= Airport South station (Guangzhou Metro) =

Guangzhou Metro station

Coordinates: 23.38657°N 113.30302°E

Airport South (Terminal 1) 机场南（1号航站楼）
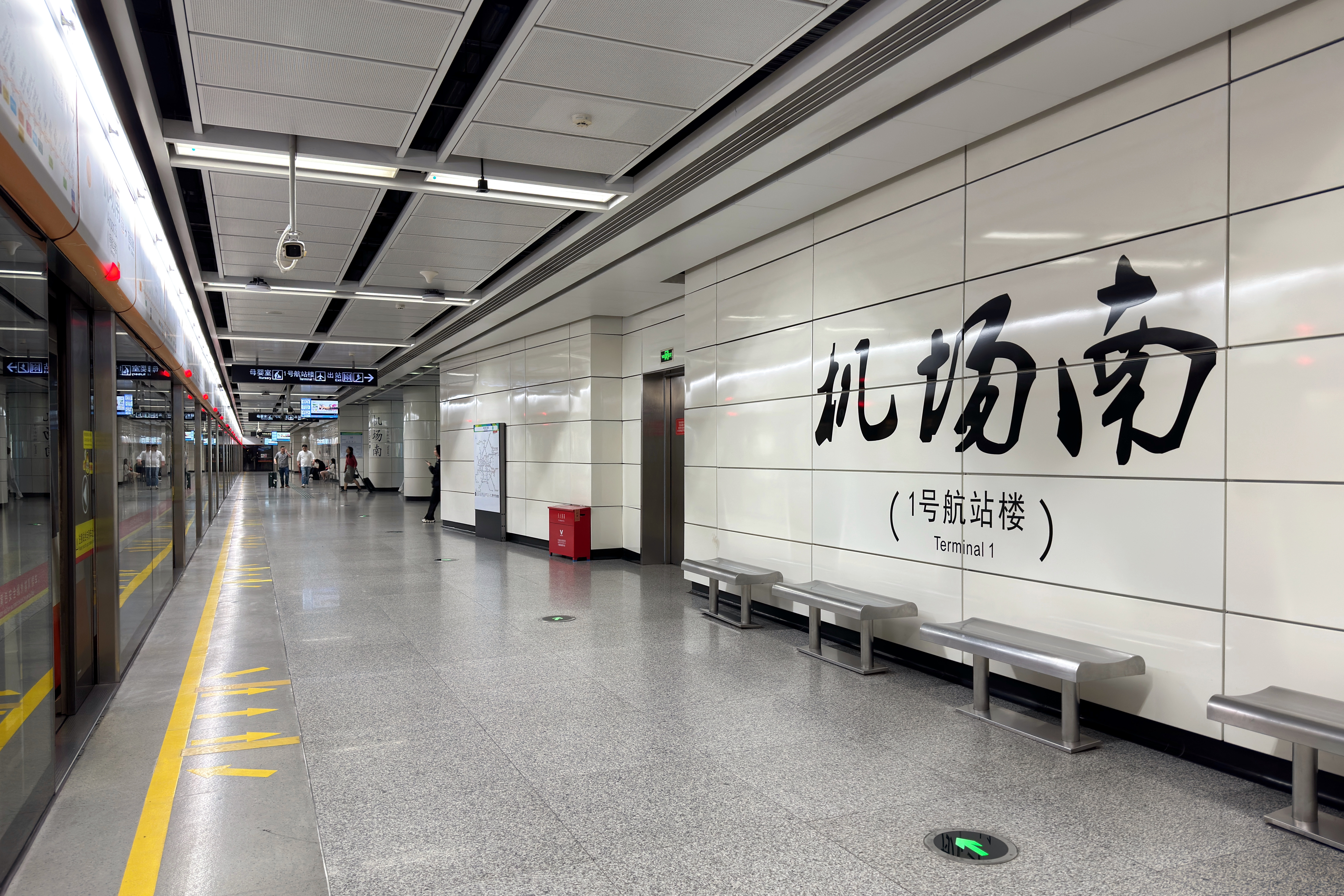
- Platform 1

Chinese name
- Simplified Chinese: 机场南站（1号航站楼）
- Traditional Chinese: 機場南站（1號航站樓）
Transcriptions
Standard Mandarin
- Hanyu Pinyin: Jīchǎng Nán Zhàn (Yīháo Hángzhànlóu)
Yue: Cantonese
- Yale Romanization: Gēichèuhng Nàahm Jaahm (Yāthouh Hòhngjaahmlàuh)
- Jyutping: Gei^{1}coeng^{4} Naam^{4} Zaam^{6} (Jat^{1}hou^{6} Hong^{4}zaam^{6}lau^{4})

General information
- Location: Huadu District, Guangzhou, Guangdong; China
- Operated by: Guangzhou Metro Co. Ltd.
- Line: Line 3
- Platforms: 2 (2 side platforms)
- Tracks: 2
- Connections: Guangzhou Baiyun International Airport (Terminal 1); Baiyun Airport South

Construction
- Structure type: Underground
- Accessible: Yes

Other information
- Station code: 329

History
- Opened: 31 October 2010; 15 years ago
- Closed: 7 May 2026; 0 days ago (due to renovation of Terminal 1)

Services
Preceding station	Guangzhou Metro	Following station
Service suspended
Gaozeng towards Haibang	Line 3	Airport North (Terminal 2) Terminus
Transfer at Baiyun Airport South
Preceding station	Pearl River Delta Metropolitan Region Intercity Railway	Following station
Baiyun Airport North towards Huadu	Guangzhou East Ring intercity railway transfer at Baiyun Airport South	Baiyun Airport East towards Panyu
Location

Airport South (Terminal 1) station (simplified Chinese: 机场南站（1号航站楼）; traditional Chinese: 機場南站（1號航站樓）; Cantonese Yale: Gēichèuhng Nàahm Jaahm (Yāthouh Hòhngjaahmlàuh)) is a metro station on Line 3 of the Guangzhou Metro. The station is located directly below the Terminal 1 building of Guangzhou Baiyun International Airport. Unlike other Guangzhou Metro stations, it does not have dedicated entrances or exits at ground level. Instead the station is equipped with elevators and escalators that directly connect to the upper levels of the airport terminal building. The station began operation on October 30, 2010.

From 7 May 2026, the station will be temporarily closed and will become a non-stopping station due to Terminal 1 of Baiyun Airport being temporarily closed from 2:00 am on 7 May 2026 for the upgrading of facilities.
