= Caihong Bridge station =

Guangzhou Metro interchange station

Caihong Bridge 彩虹桥
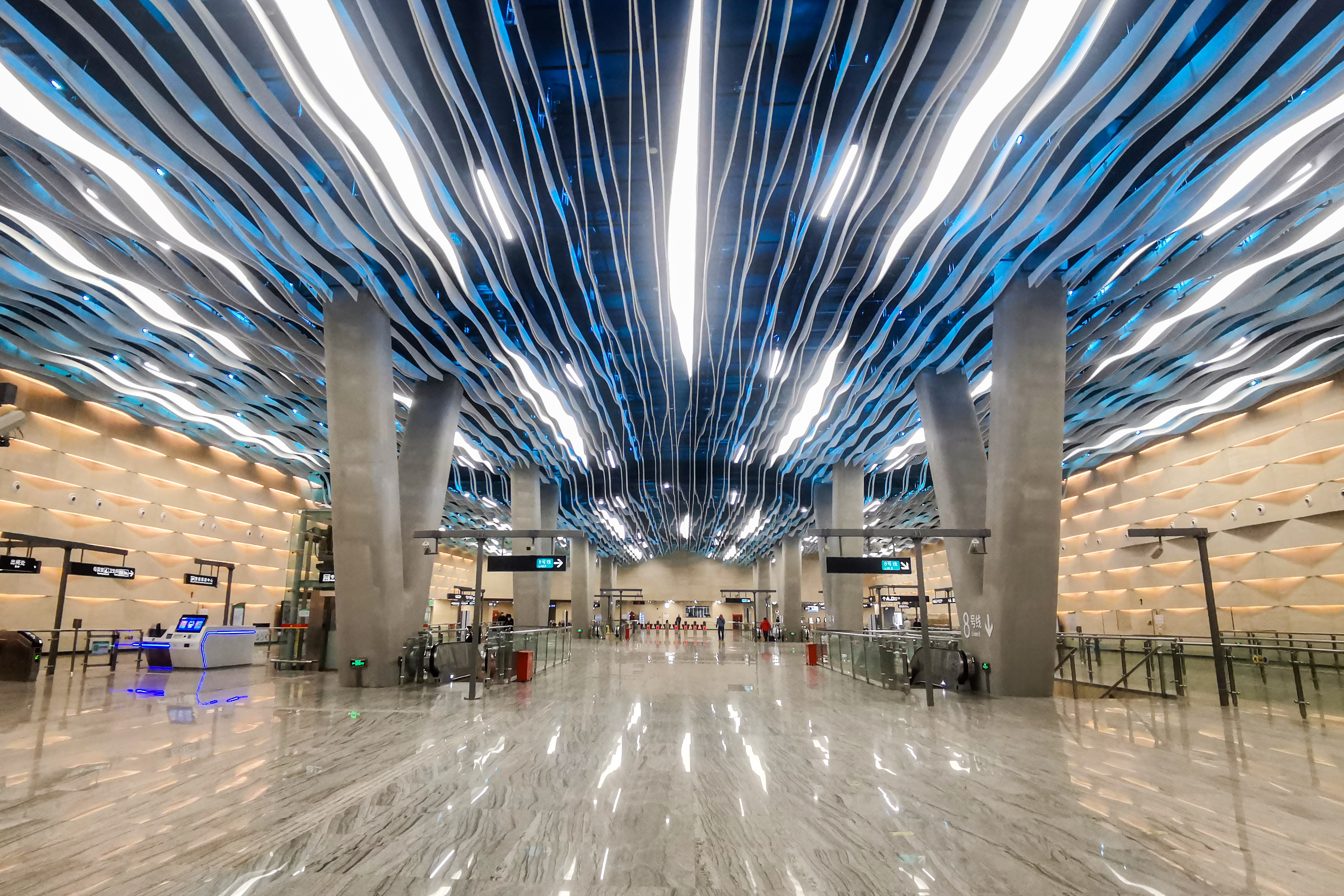
- The artistic concourse of Caihong Bridge Station

Chinese name
- Simplified Chinese: 彩虹桥站
- Traditional Chinese: 彩虹橋站
- Literal meaning: Rainbow Bridge station
Transcriptions
Standard Mandarin
- Hanyu Pinyin: Cǎihóngqiáo Zhàn
Yue: Cantonese
- Yale Romanization: Chóihùhngkìuh Jaahm
- Jyutping: Coi^{2}hung^{4}kiu^{4} Zaam^{6}
- Hong Kong Romanization: Choi Hung Bridge station

General information
- Other names: Caihongqiao (official name until 27 December 2024)
- Location: Southwest side of intersection of Liwan Road (荔湾路) and Dongfeng West Road (东风西路), border of Caihong and Liurong Subdistricts; Liwan District, Guangzhou, Guangdong; China
- Coordinates: 23°8′11.69″N 113°14′23.96″E
- Operator: Guangzhou Metro Co. Ltd.
- Lines: Line 8; Line 11; Line 13 (2026); Line 22 (U/C)
- Platforms: 8 (3 island platforms and 2 side platforms in Spanish solution format)
- Tracks: 6

Construction
- Structure type: Underground
- Accessible: Yes

Other information
- Station code: 811 1116

History
- Opened: Line 8: 28 September 2022 (4 years ago); Line 11: 28 December 2024 (22 months ago); Line 13: December 2026 (1 month's time) (expected)

Services
Preceding station	Guangzhou Metro	Following station
Xicun towards Jiaoxin	Line 8	Chen Clan Academy towards Wanshengwei
Zhongshanba Outer Circle	Line 11	Liuhua Inner Circle
Future services
Xichang towards Yagang	Line 13 Opening 2026	Sun Yat-sen Memorial Hall towards Xinsha
Guangzhou Railway Station towards Airport North (Terminal 2)	Line 22	Fangcun towards Panyu Square
Location

Caihong Bridge Station (simplified Chinese: 彩虹桥站; traditional Chinese: 彩虹橋站; pinyin: Cǎihóngqiáo Zhàn; Cantonese Yale: Chóihùhngkìuh Jaahm; lit. 'Rainbow Bridge station') is an interchange station between Line 8 and Line 11 of the Guangzhou Metro. It is situated underground near the Southwest gate of the Liuhua Lake Park.

Due to construction delays, the station could not open with the rest of the northern extension of Line 8 in 2020 and was hence delayed to open on 28 September 2 years later. Line 11 opened at this station on 28 December 2024.

== Station structure ==
This station has four floors. The ground level are the station entrances and exits, and is surrounded by Liwan Road, Dongfeng West Road along with the elevated highway, Xihua Road, Liuhua Lake Park and surrounding buildings. The first floor is the mezzanine/transfer level between the entrances/exits and the concourse, the second floor is the concourse, the third floor are the Line 11 and Line 13 platforms, as well as the transfer level/equipment area for Line 8, and the fourth floor are the Line 8 platforms.

Due to the constraints imposed by the Deni Interchange overpass above Dongfeng West Road, the station buildings for Line 8 and Lines 11 and 13 are located on the north and south sides of Dongfeng West Road respectively, with their concourses and platforms connected by multiple underground tunnels that pass under Dongfeng West Road.

The Caihong Bridge main substation of Lines 11 and 13 is located at the east end structure of the Lines 11 and 13 stations, and this station has also become the first station of Guangzhou Metro to have a main substation embedded on the line.

The station has 3 sets of toilets and nurseries. They are located near Exit A of the non-paid area on the southeast side of the Line 8 concourse, and at one end of both island platforms on Lines 11 and 13 towards Zhongshanba and Xichang.

G	-	Exits A, C, D, F, H
L1	North Lobby Mezzanine	Exit G, Ticket Machines, Security Facilities
L1	South Lobby Mezzanine	Reserved passage to Exit B (unopened)
L1	Exit D Transfer Level	Security Facilities, Towards Exit D and South Lobby
L2; Concourse	North Lobby ( 11 & 13 )	Ticket Machines, Customer Service, Security Facilities
L2; Concourse	Line 22 Lobby (U/C)	Ticket Machines, Customer Service, Shops, Police Station, Security Facilities
L2; Concourse	Transfer Linkway	Paid transfer link between Lines 8, 11, 13 & 22
L2; Concourse	South Lobby ( 8 )	Ticket Machines, Customer Service, Shops, Police Station, Security Facilities, Toilets, Nursery
L3; Line 8 Mezzanine; 11 and 13 platforms
L3; Line 8 Mezzanine; 11 and 13 platforms	Line 8 Buffer Area	Station equipment
L3; Line 8 Mezzanine; 11 and 13 platforms	Platform 5	11 Outer Circle (Zhongshanba)
L3; Line 8 Mezzanine; 11 and 13 platforms	Island platform, doors open on the left for 11 and right for 13 (Toilets, Nursery)
L3; Line 8 Mezzanine; 11 and 13 platforms	Platform 8	13 reserved platform
L3; Line 8 Mezzanine; 11 and 13 platforms	Platform 7	13 reserved platform
L3; Line 8 Mezzanine; 11 and 13 platforms	Island platform, doors open on the left for 11 and right for 13 (Toilets, Nursery)
L3; Line 8 Mezzanine; 11 and 13 platforms	Platform 6	11 Inner Circle (Liuhua)
L4; 8 Platforms; Line 22 Mezzanine (U/C)
L4; 8 Platforms; Line 22 Mezzanine (U/C)	Side platform, doors will open on the right for alighting only
L4; 8 Platforms; Line 22 Mezzanine (U/C)	Platform 3 ↑ Platform 1 ↓	8 towards Jiaoxin (Xicun)
L4; 8 Platforms; Line 22 Mezzanine (U/C)	Island platform, doors will open on the left for boarding only
L4; 8 Platforms; Line 22 Mezzanine (U/C)	Platform 2 ↑ Platform 4 ↓	8 towards Wanshengwei (Chen Clan Academy)
L4; 8 Platforms; Line 22 Mezzanine (U/C)	Side platform, doors will open on the right for alighting only
L4; 8 Platforms; Line 22 Mezzanine (U/C)	Line 22 Buffer Area	Station equipment
L5; 22 Platforms (U/C)	Platform 10	22 towards Panyu Square (Fangcun)
L5; 22 Platforms (U/C)	Island platform, doors will open on the left (U/C)
L5; 22 Platforms (U/C)	Platform 9	22 towards Airport North (Terminal 2) (Guangzhou Railway Station)

=== Station design ===
The station has a total building area of approximately 86,000 square meters, equivalent to four standard stations. The concourses for Lines 8, 11 and 13 feature a double-height design, with public areas reaching heights of 10.4 to 11 meters, twice that of ordinary stations, and are supported by large Y-shaped concrete columns.

Combining the "rainbow" (English translation of 'Caihong') in the station name and the cultural characteristics of the area where the station is located, the metro has built the station into a characteristic station of Line 8, with the design theme of "Southward Rainbow, Not Inferior to Suzhou". The wall of the station hall layer introduces elements of the western city wall of the Southern Han Dynasty, and the exterior wall is decorated with the same historical satellite images as the wall of the Line 8 platform, reflecting the Rainbow Bridge as the Xiguan in the history of the fortress. The station ceiling is transformed by curved grille shapes and lighting to present a rainbow effect; The station floor is made of natural stone with a rippled texture, which echoes the rainbow theme. The ground part of the station at Exits A and C adopts a blue square design that is different from the exits of other stations, and the interior wall is made of colored tiles and rainbow glass to form a "rainbow wall". Exit D and the interchange passage between Line 8 and Line 11/13 also use light refraction to form a "rainbow wall". The stations of Line 11 and Line 13 only retain the yellow city wall elements, and the ceiling is not set up with rainbow light strips like Line 8.

In addition, there are a total of 43 escalators in the station section of Line 11 and Line 13, making it one of the three stations with more than 40 escalators on the whole of Line 11, the other two being Shahe station and Guangzhou University of Chinese Medicine station.

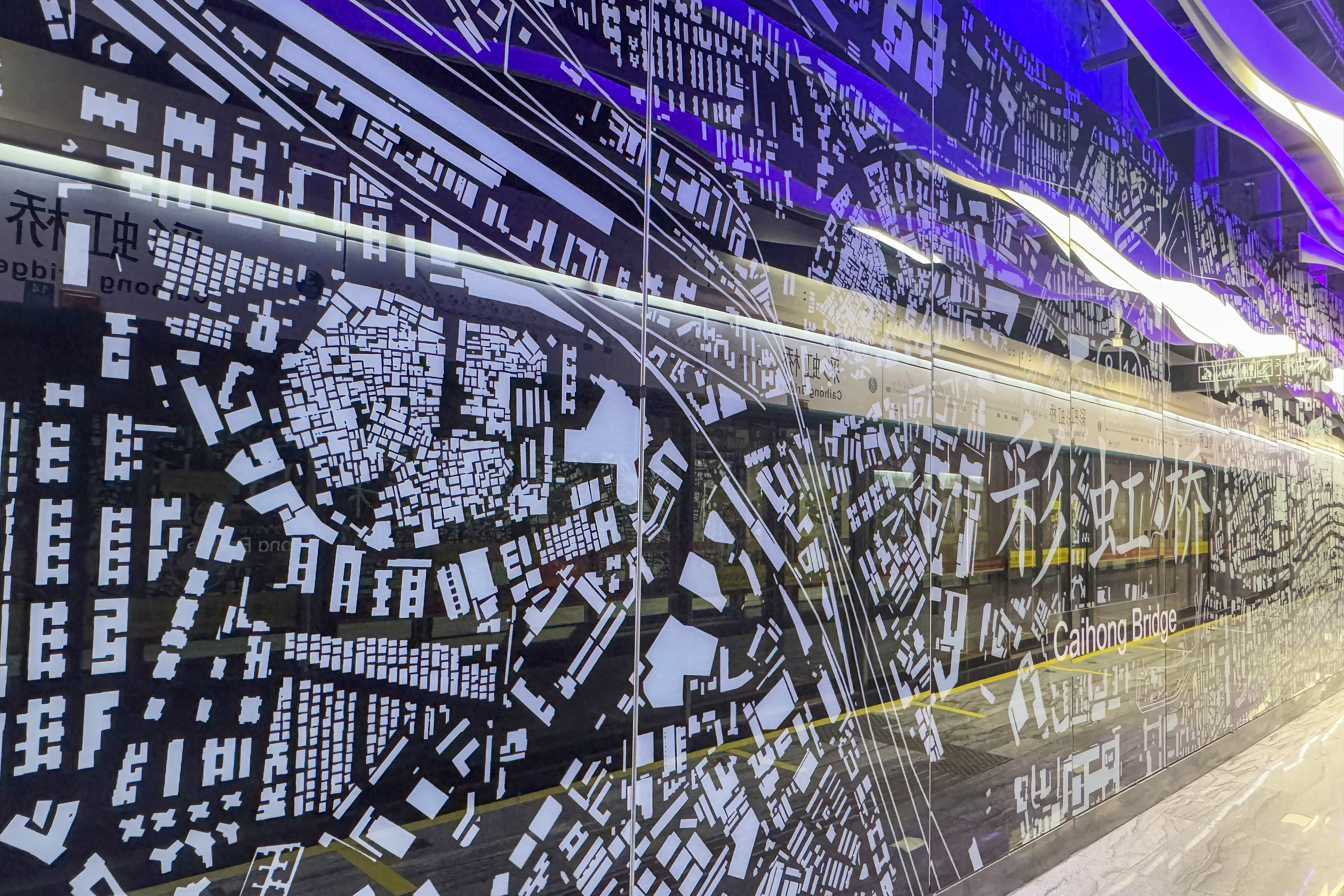
The side wall of the large character wall on Line 8 platform uses satellite images as the background

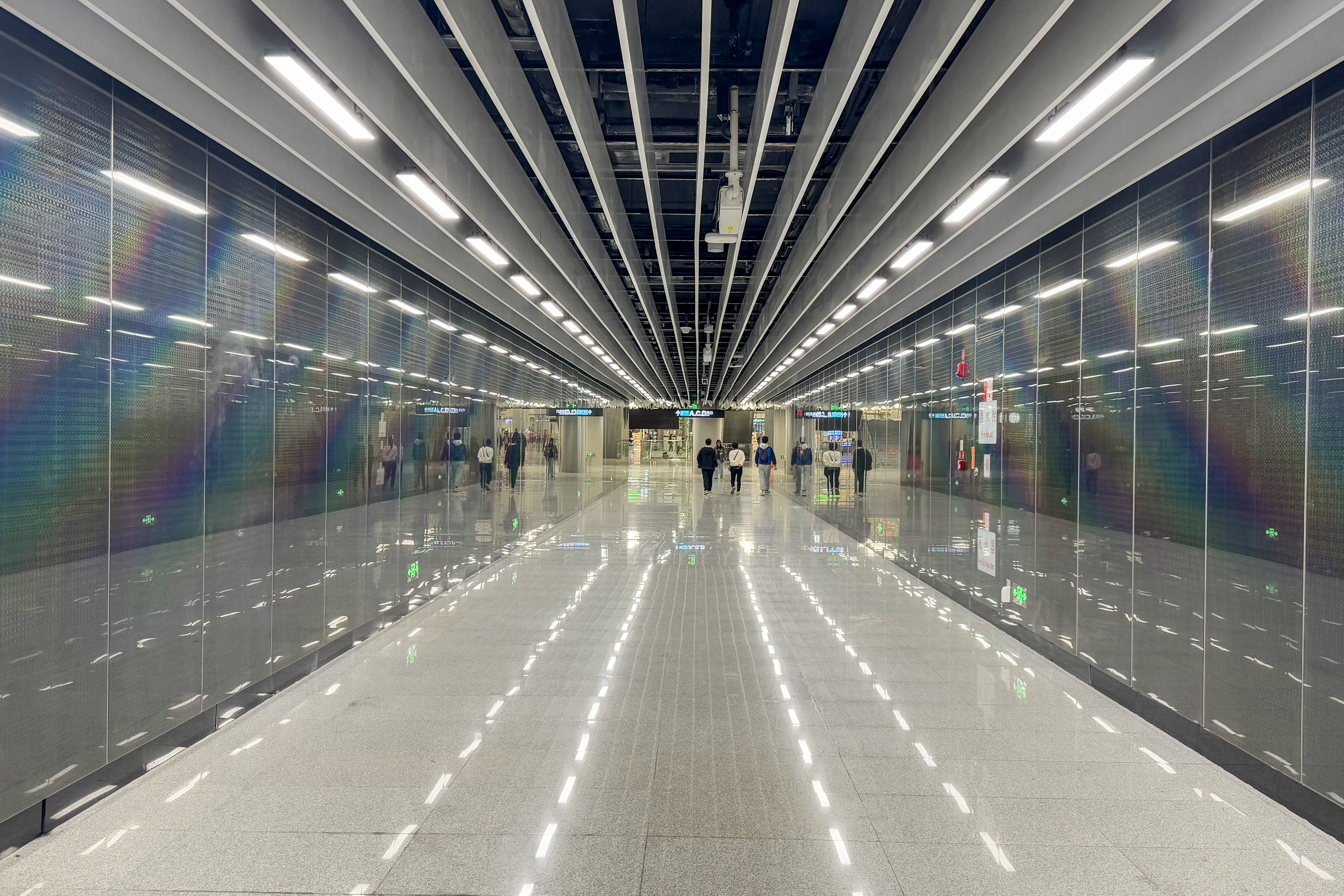
The “rainbow wall” refraction panel design of the concourse communication channel

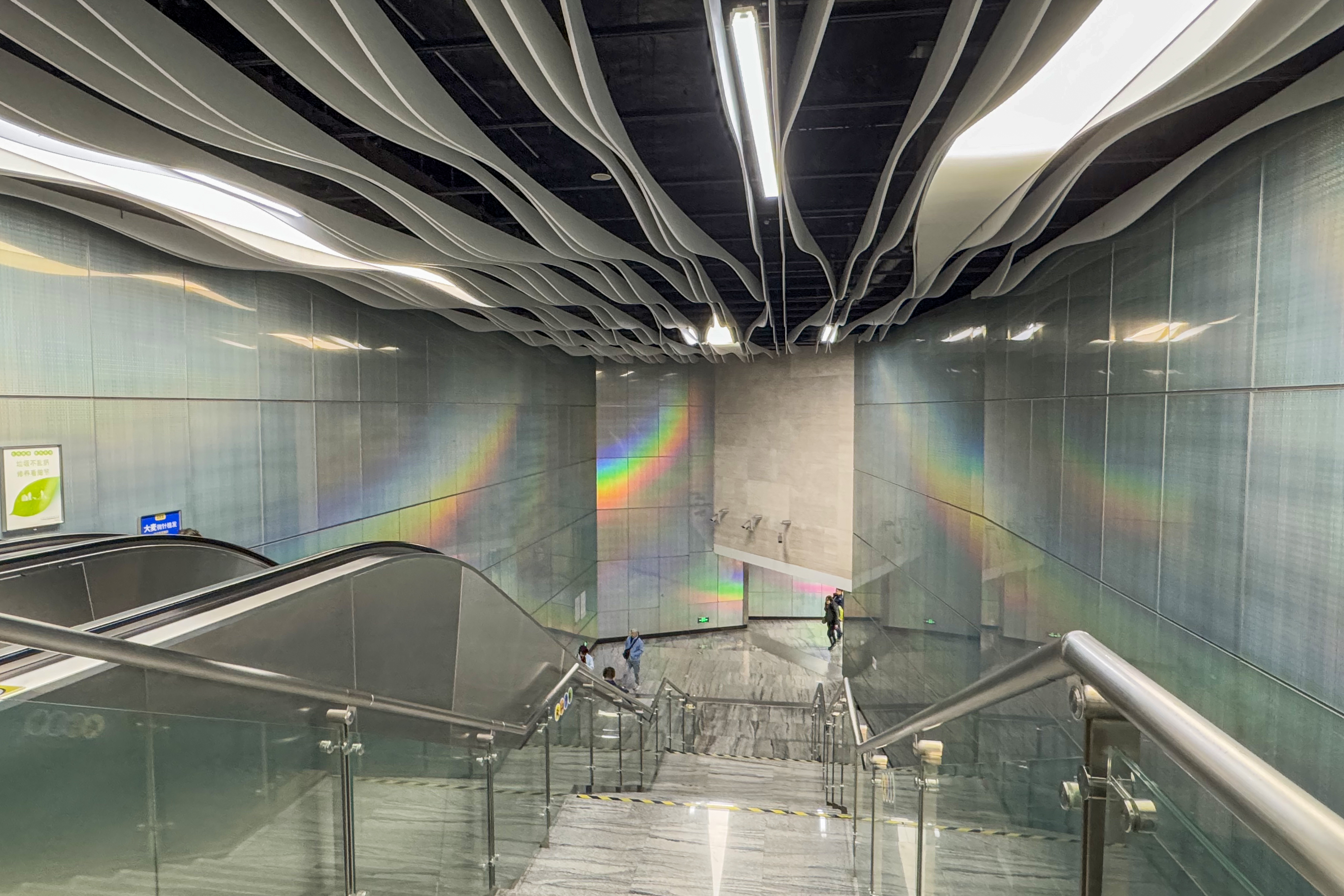
Exit D "Rainbow Wall" refraction panel design

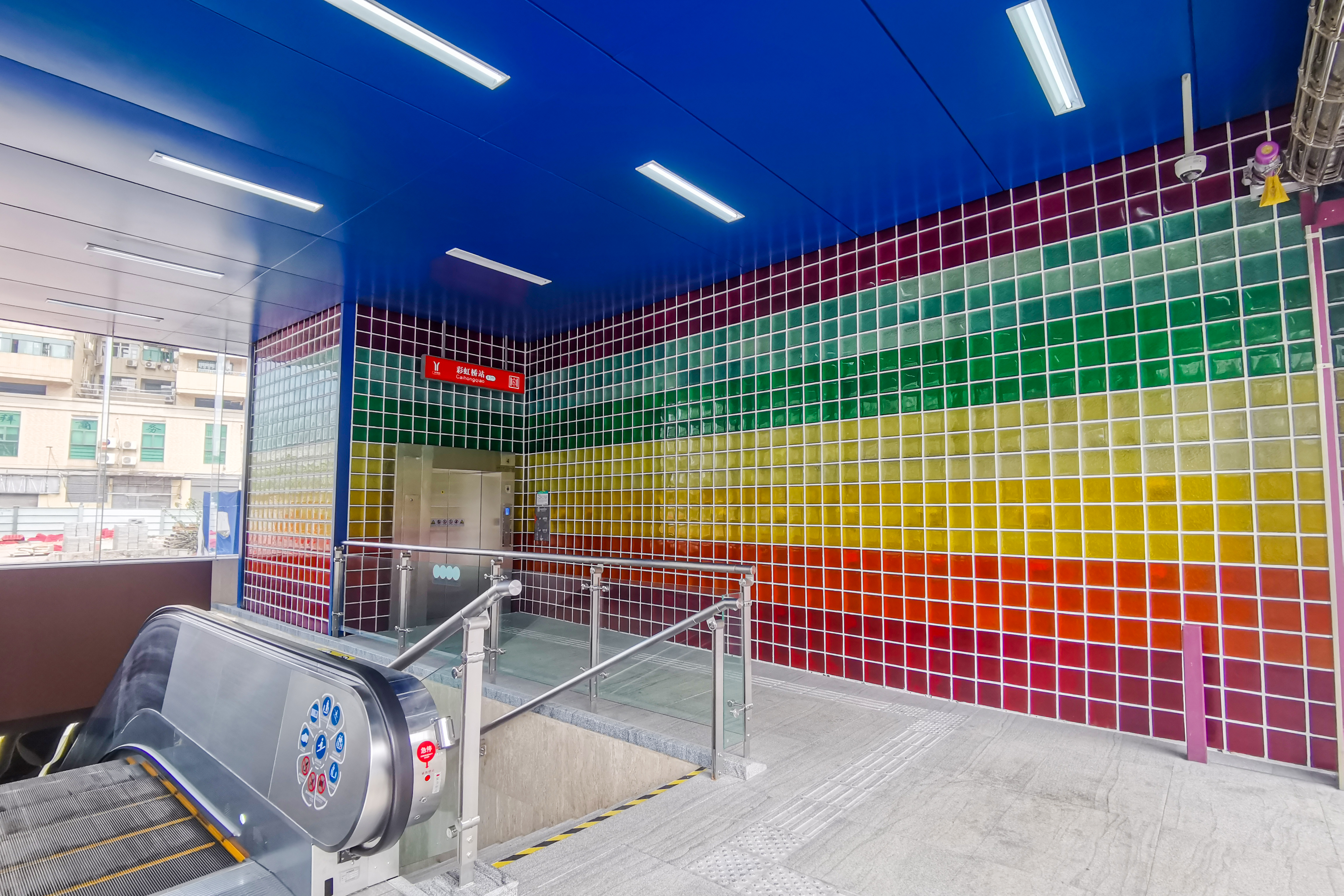
Mosaic "rainbow wall" design on the surface level wall of Exit A

=== Concourse ===
The station has a South Concourse used by Line 8 and a North Concourse shared by Lines 11 and 13. To facilitate passenger access and transfers, the area south of the center of the North Concourse, and the central and western sides of the South Concourse are designated as paid areas. The paid area on the west side of the South Concourse is only for passengers exiting from Platform 4 of Line 8. The paid and unpaid areas between the North and South Concourses are connected by a covered passageway.

Additionally, a mezzanine was originally planned above the north end of the Line 8 concourse for the future use of Exit B. Initially used as a viewing platform, it is currently closed, and the stairs and escalators leading to the platform are blocked. A similar mezzanine is located above the Line 11 and 13 concourses for Exit G. Both mezzanines are equipped with ticket machines and turnstiles.

Each of the three platforms on Line 8 has its own dedicated elevator, multiple escalators, and stairs in its concourse. The elevator door connecting to Platform 4 is located near Exit D in the non-paid area, of which assistance from station staff is required to use it. Lines 11 and 13 also have their own dedicated elevators, multiple escalators, and stairs connecting their respective platforms in their concourses.

Both the north and south concourses have ticket machines and an AI customer service center. Shops are located next to Exit A in the south concourse, while AEDs are located near Exit D.

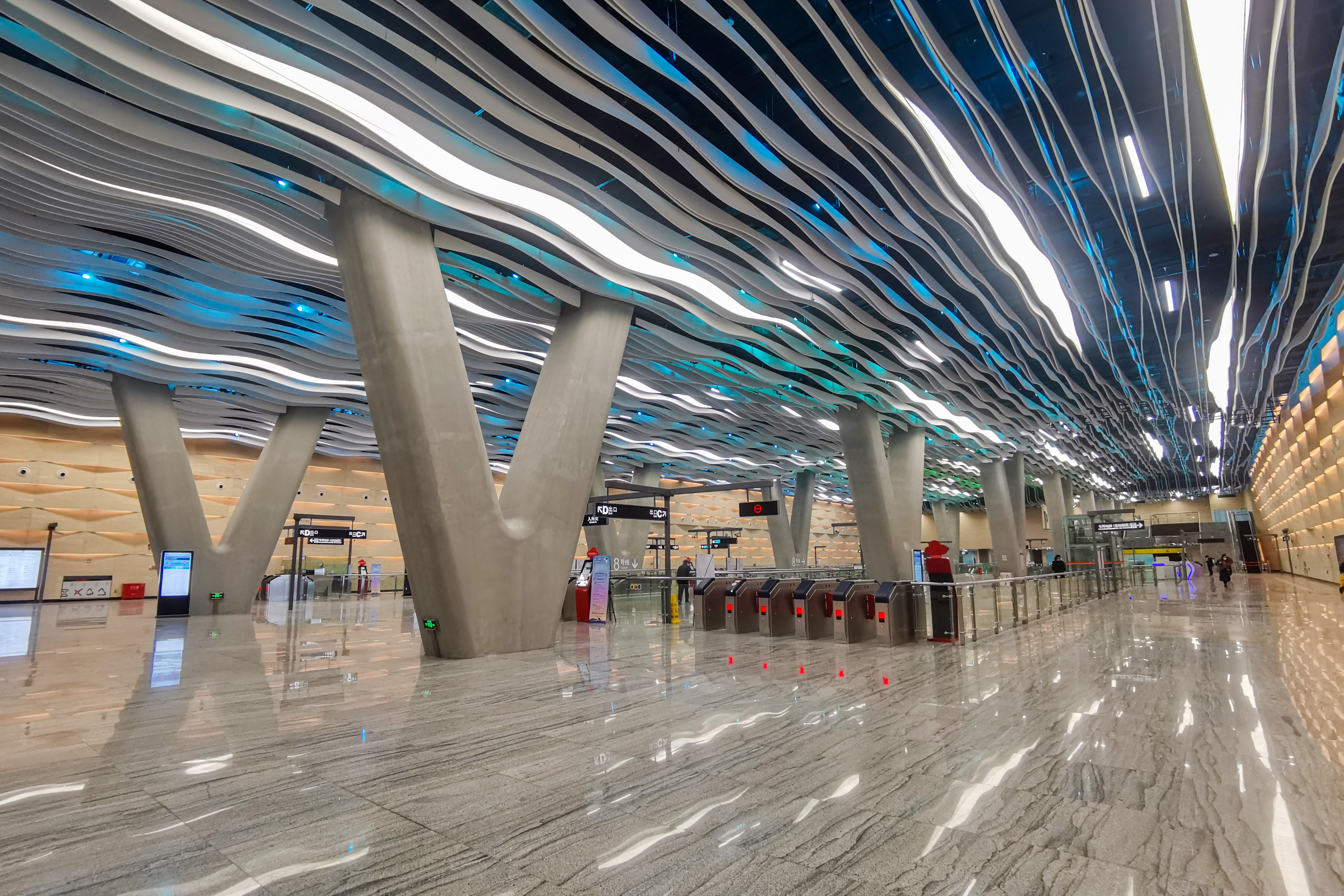
South concourse (Line 8)

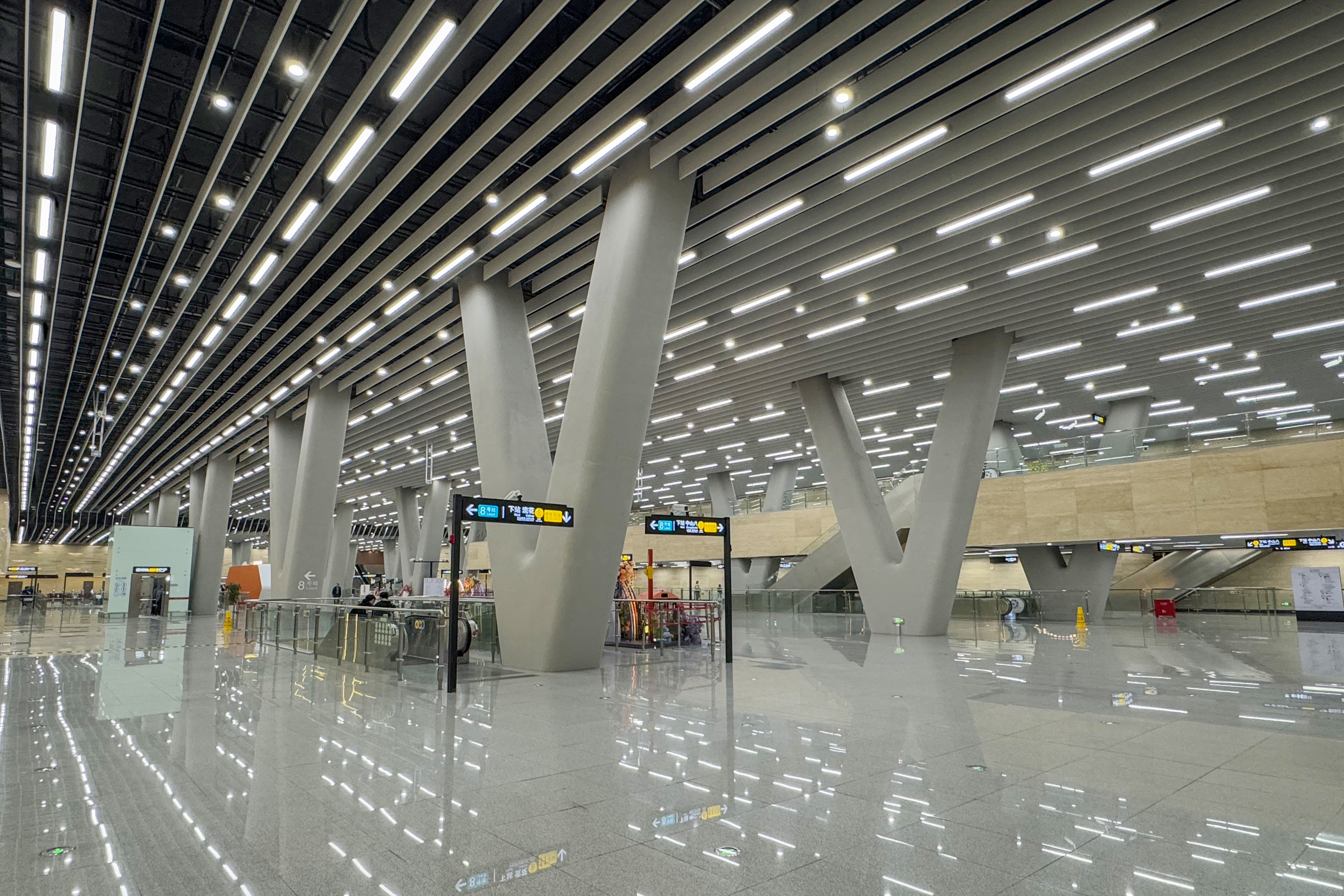
North concourse (Lines 11 & 13)

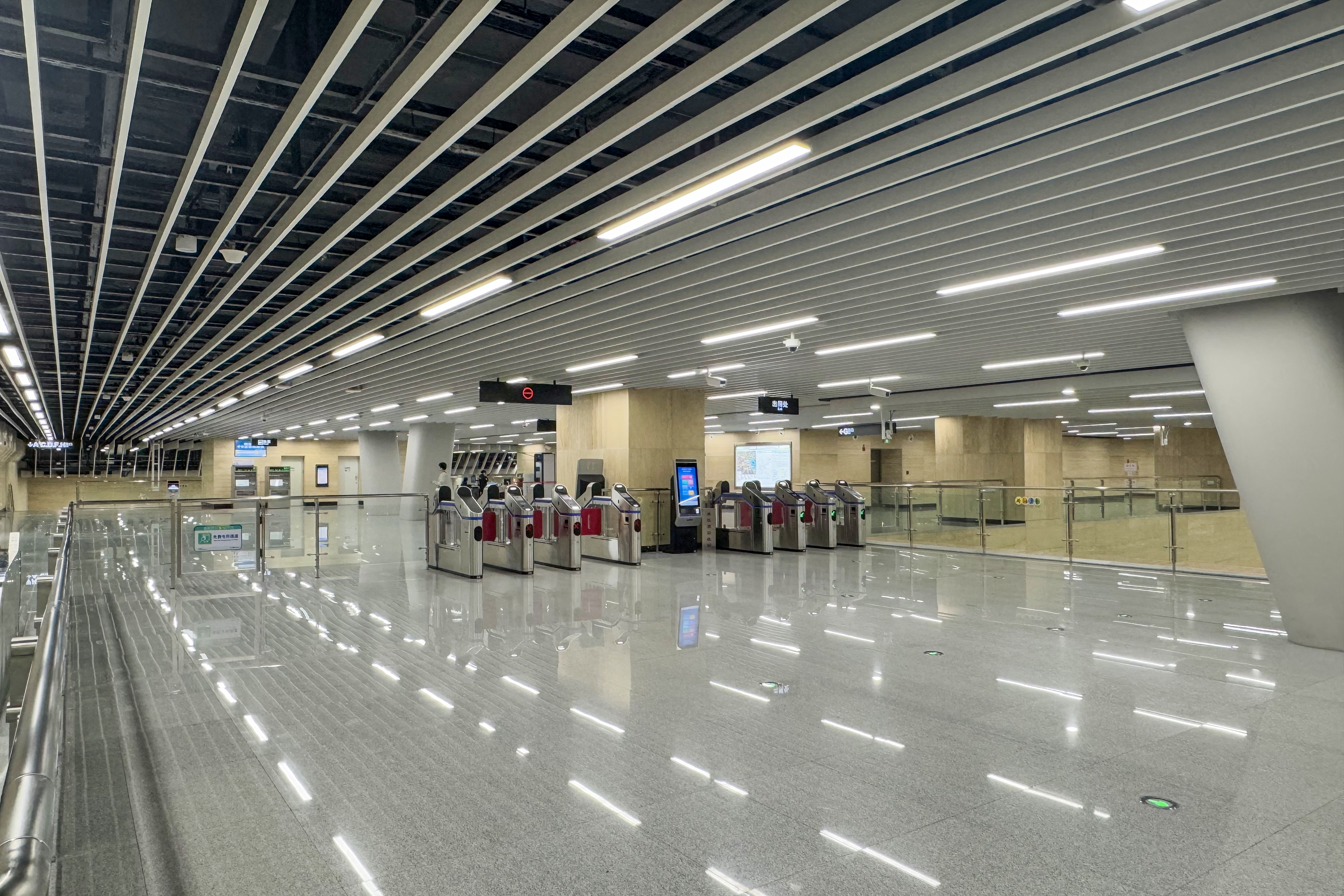
North lobby mezzanine towards Exit G

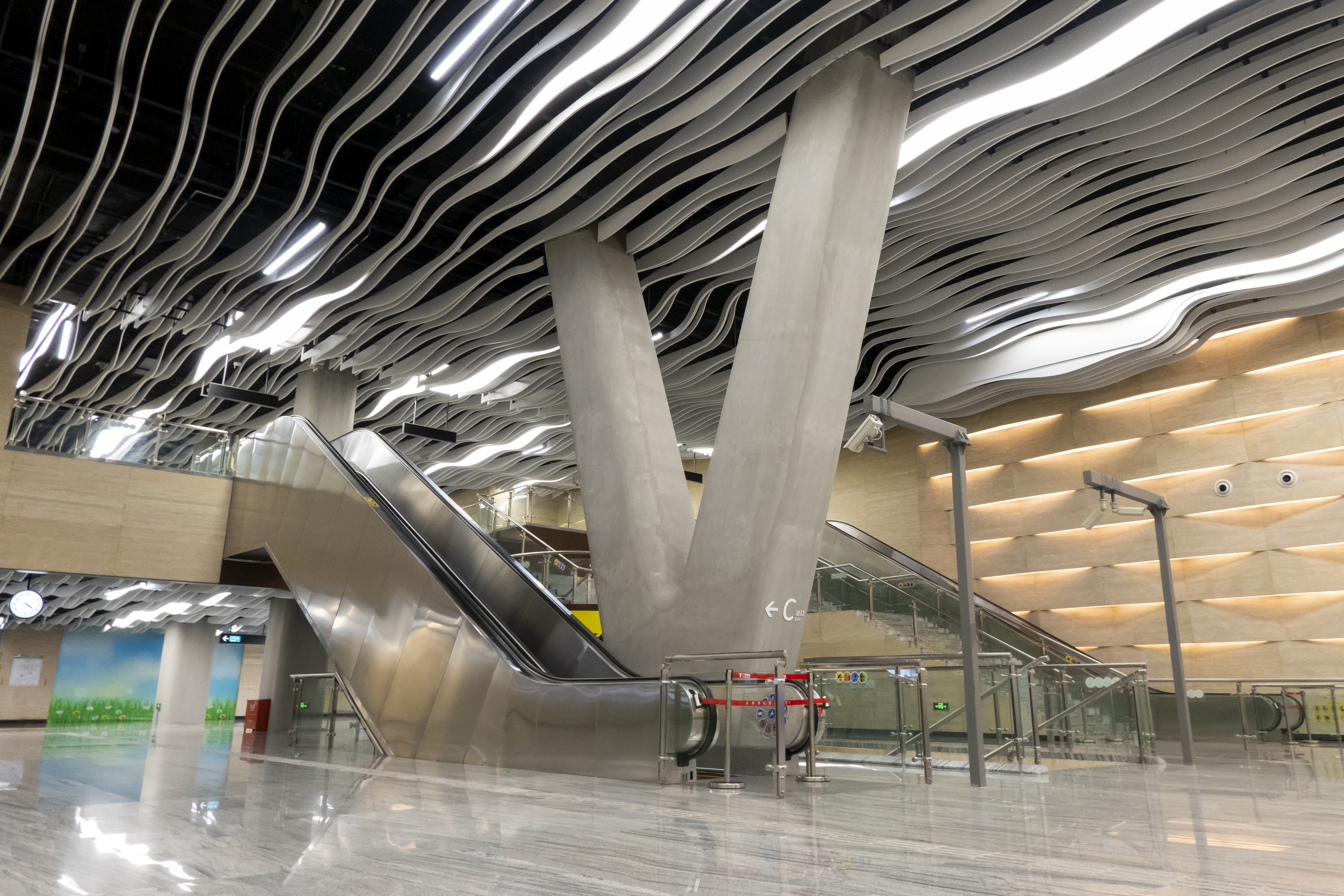
South lobby mezzanine (currently closed)

=== Interchange style ===
At present, Line 8 passengers transferring to Line 11 can directly go to the two platforms of Line 11 through the transfer channel set up on the north side of both side platforms on Line 8. On the other hand, heading from Line 11 to Line 8 requires a transfer via the concourse.

Line 11 and Line 13 use a cross-platform transfer system, allowing passengers to walk to the opposite platform to directly transfer to another train to their destination, or to transfer to another train through the concourse to their destination.

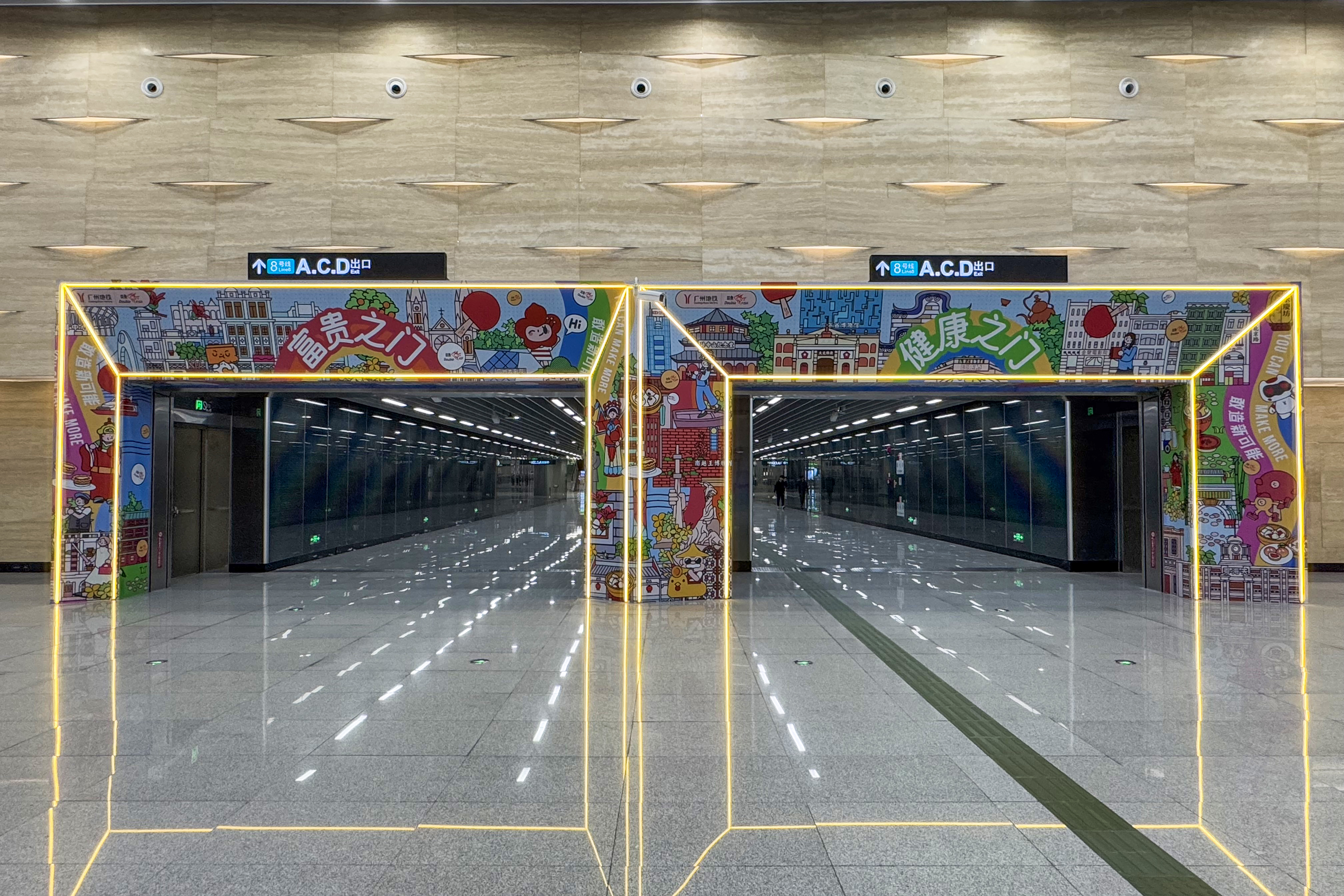
Transfer node entrance towards Line 8 concourse from Lines 11 & 13 concourse

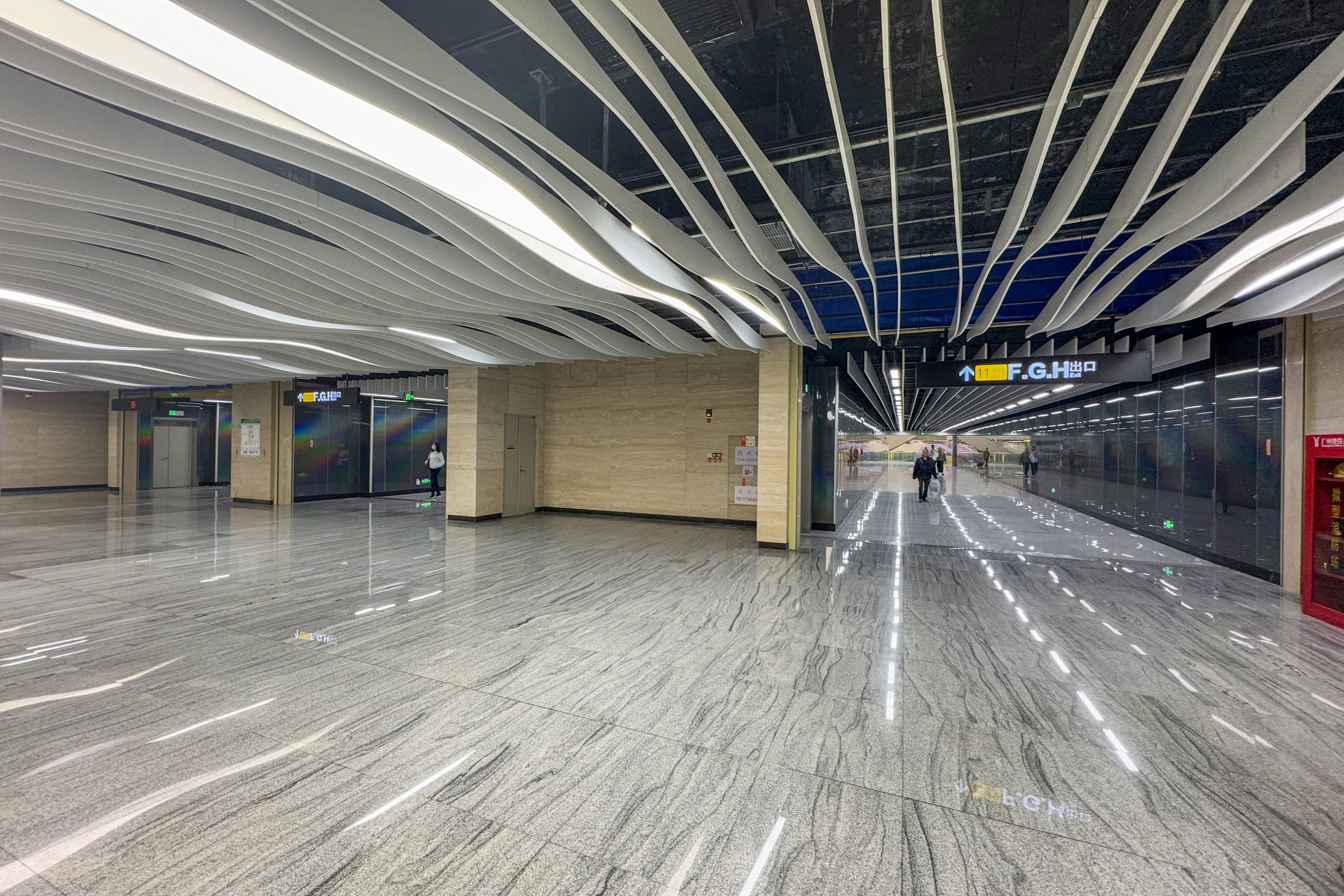
Transfer node entrance towards Lines 11 & 13 concourse from Line 8 concourse

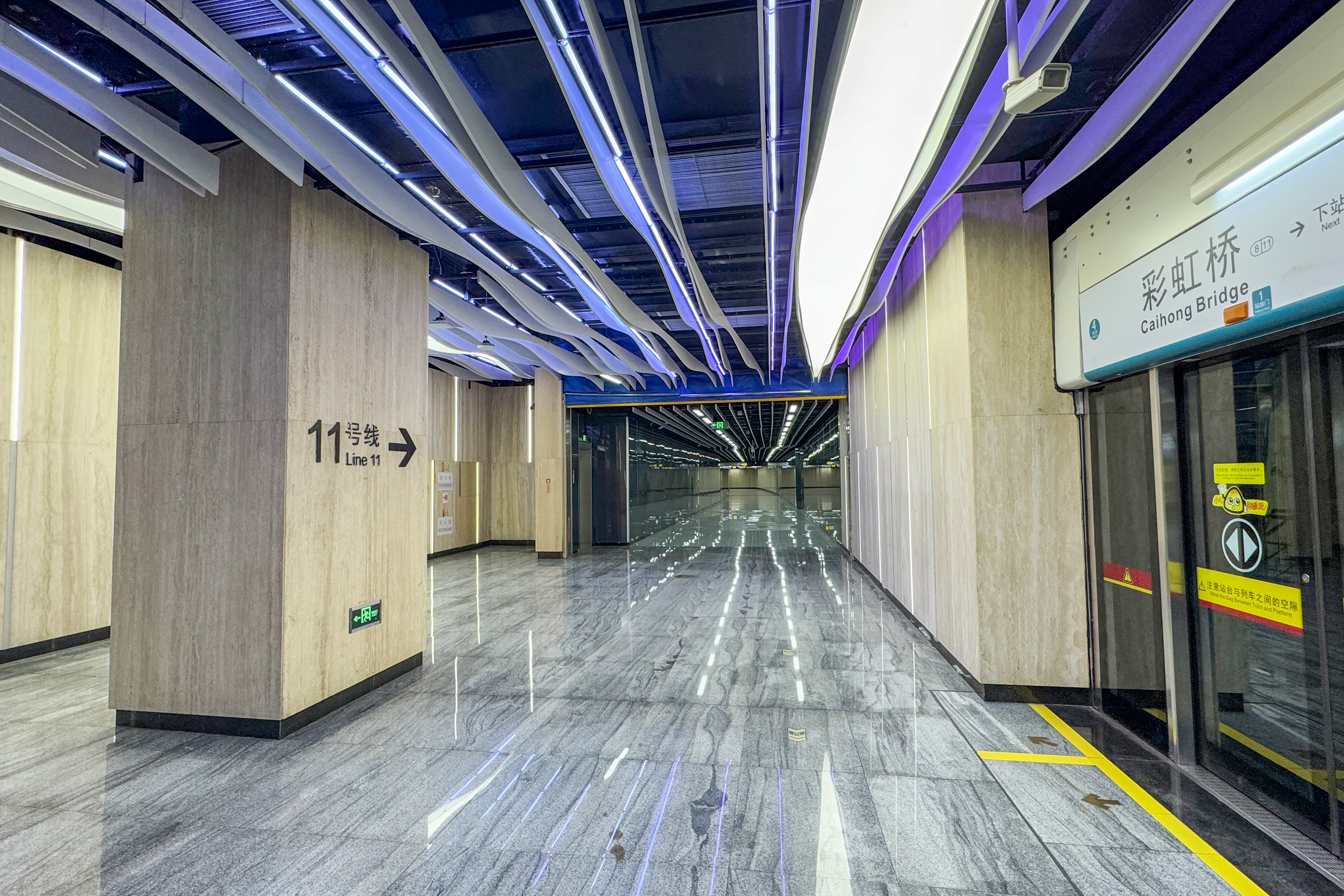
Line 8 platform 4 transfer node towards Lines 11 & 13

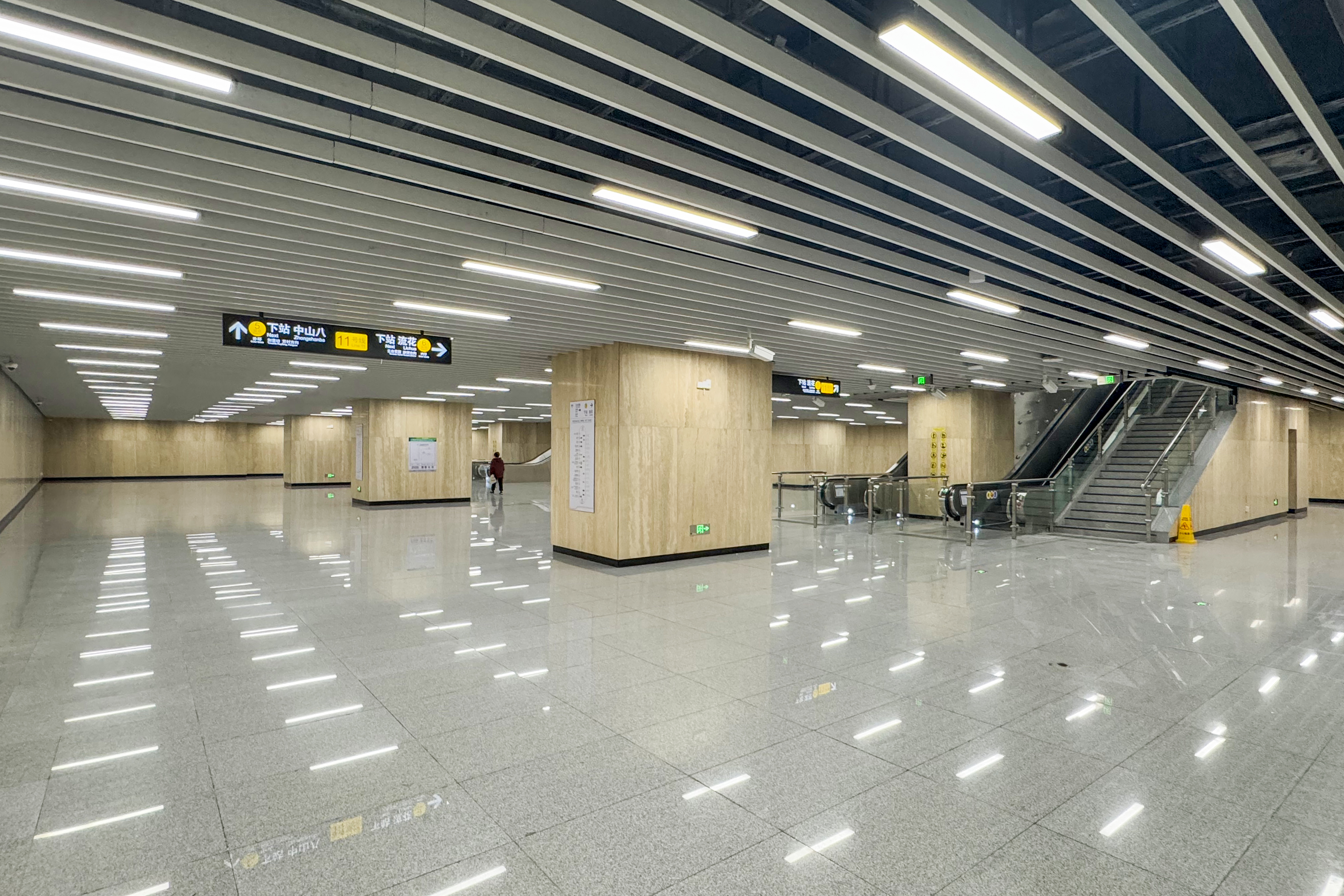
Line 8 platform 3 transfer passageway towards Lines 11 & 13, equipped with escalators and stairs

=== Platforms ===
The Line 8 platform at this station is a set of Spanish-style platforms, located under Liwan Road. The central island platform is for boarding, and the two side platforms are for alighting. The train opens the right-hand doors first for alighting, and then the left-hand doors for boarding. (Note: It is worth mentioning that the platform layout and boarding arrangements were adopted as early as the metro's first interchange station, Gongyuanqian station. This is the first new station to adopt this layout in nearly 20 years since the opening of that station in 2002.)

Line 11 and Line 13 share two island platforms, located under the south side of Liuhua Lake Park in Yuexiu District, near Dongfeng West Road. Line 11 uses the outer platforms 5 and 6, while Line 13 uses the inner platforms 7 and 8. Additionally, a crossover track is located on the east side of the Line 13 platform at this station.

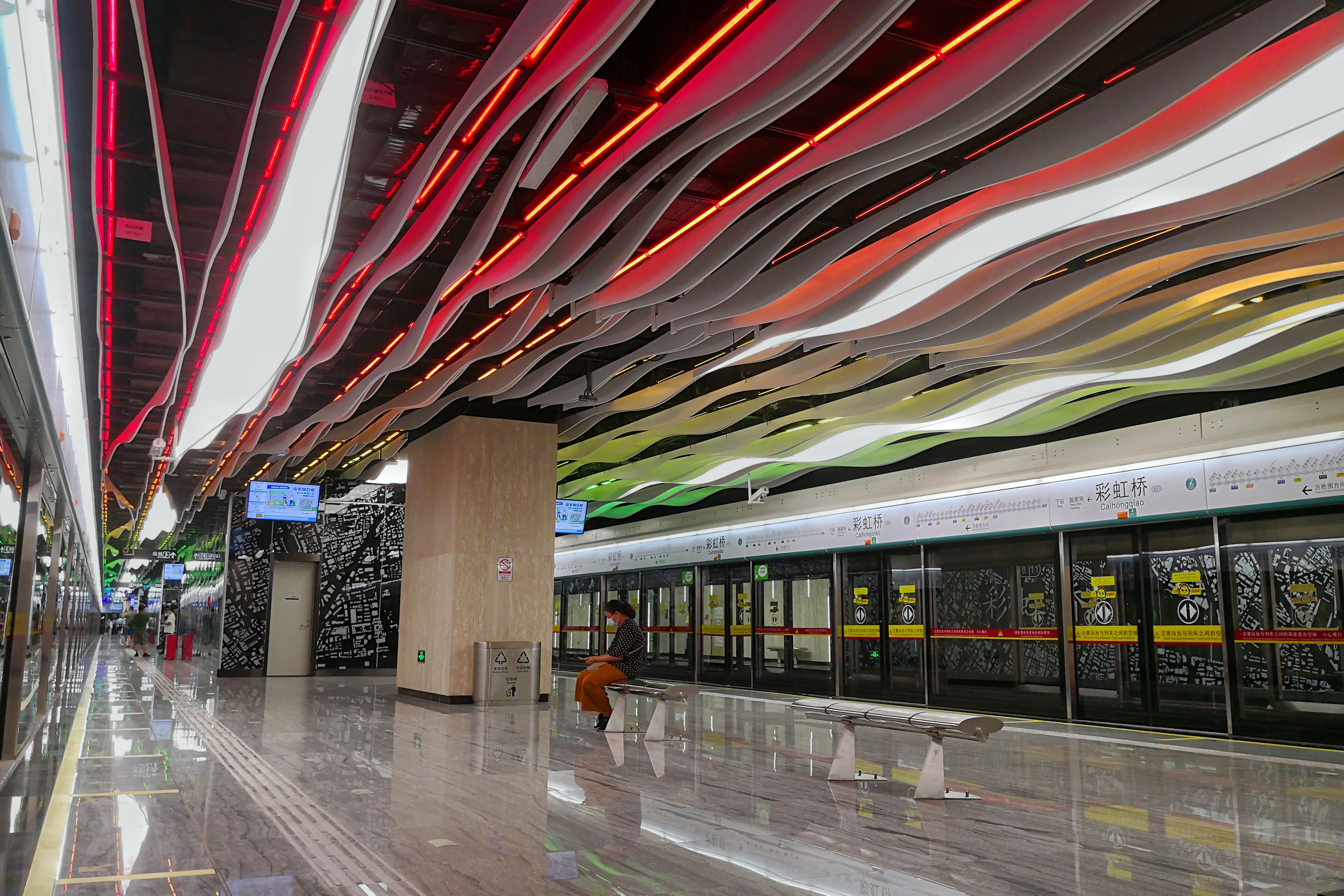
Line 8 island platform

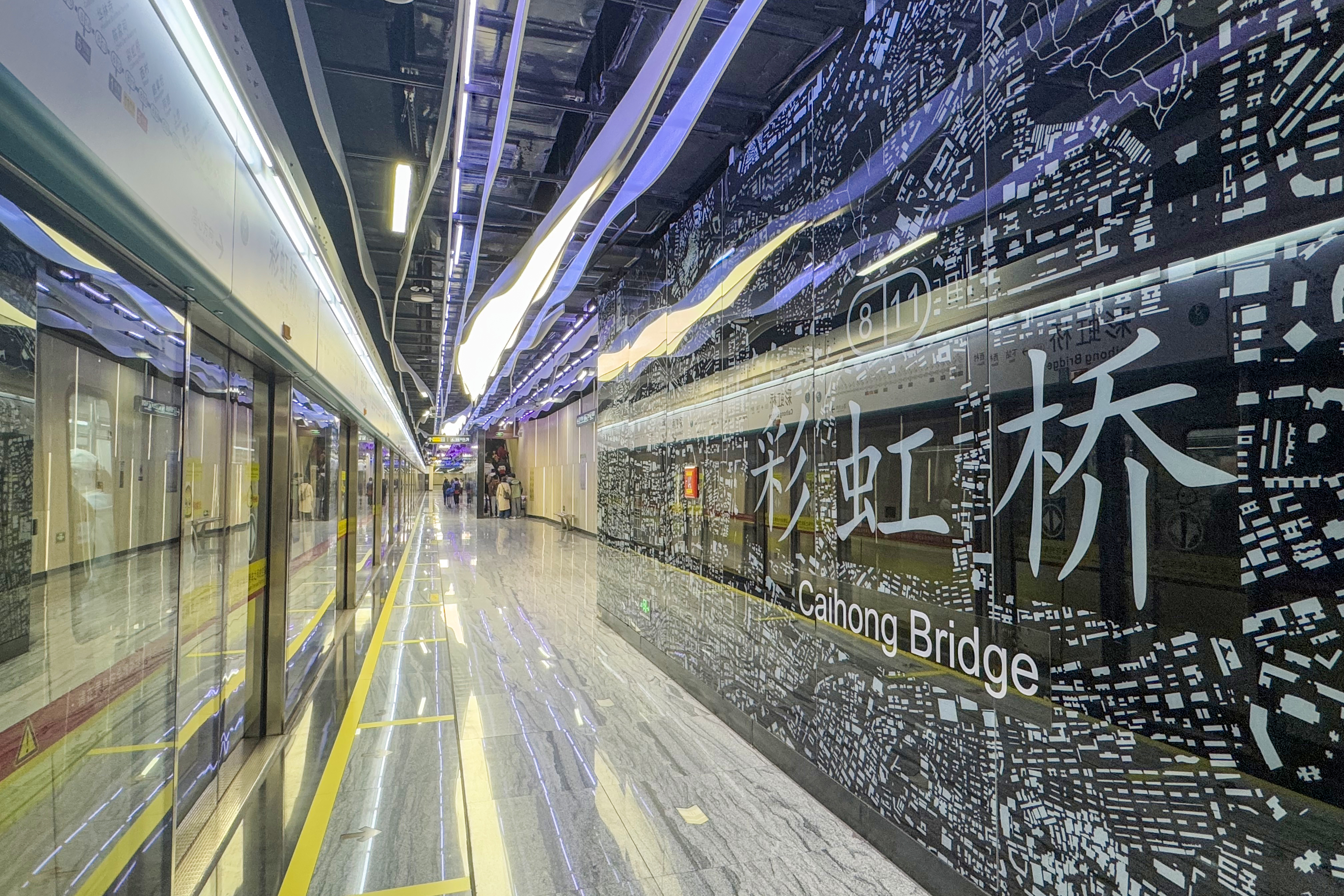
Line 8 platform 3

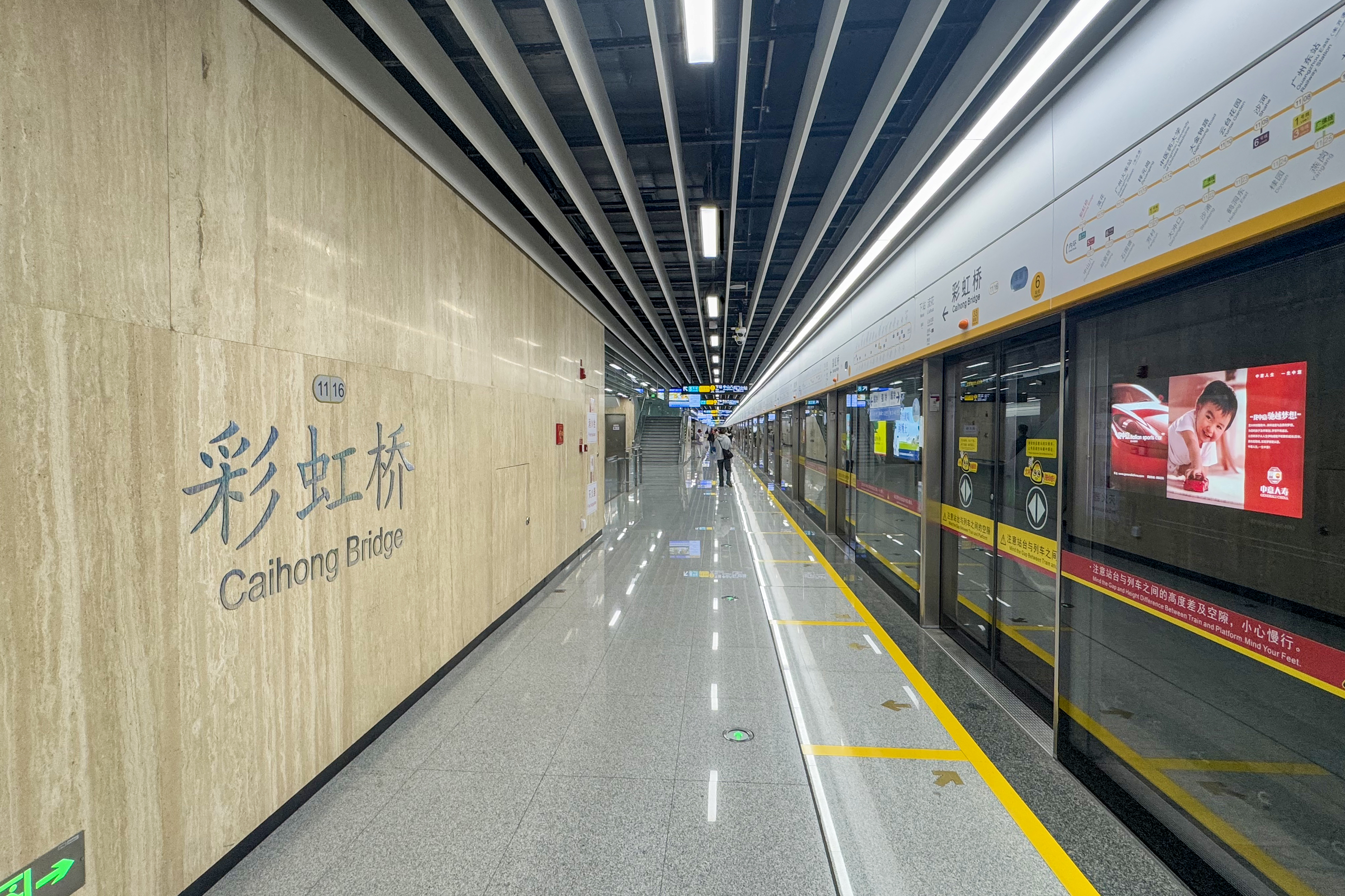
Line 11 platform 6 (Inner Circle platform)

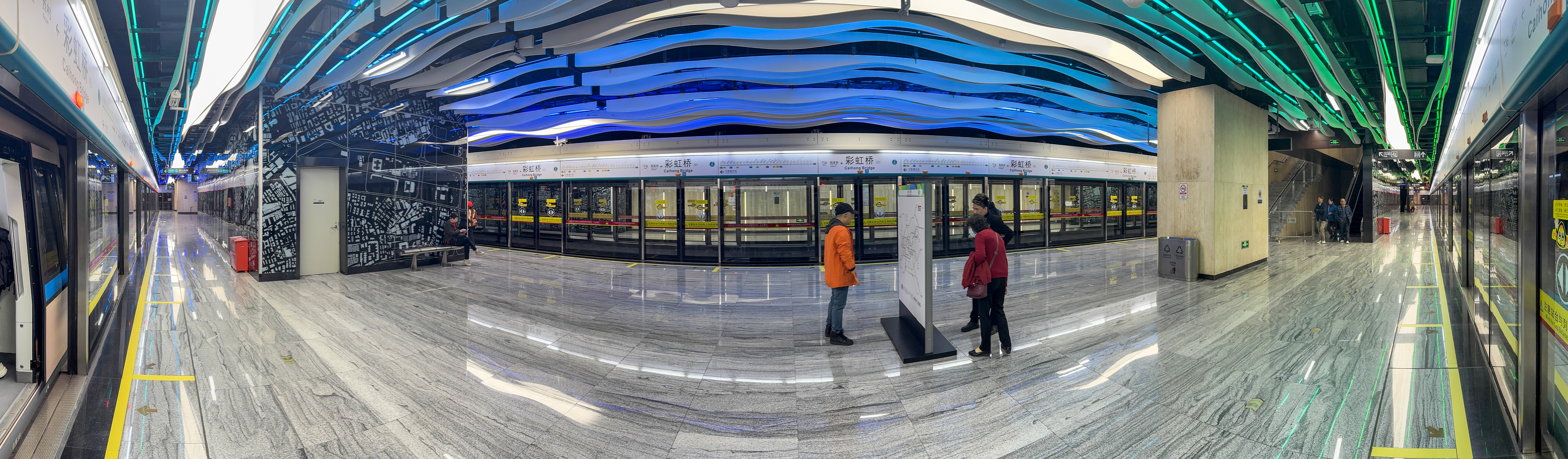
Line 8 platform 1 panorama (boarding platform)

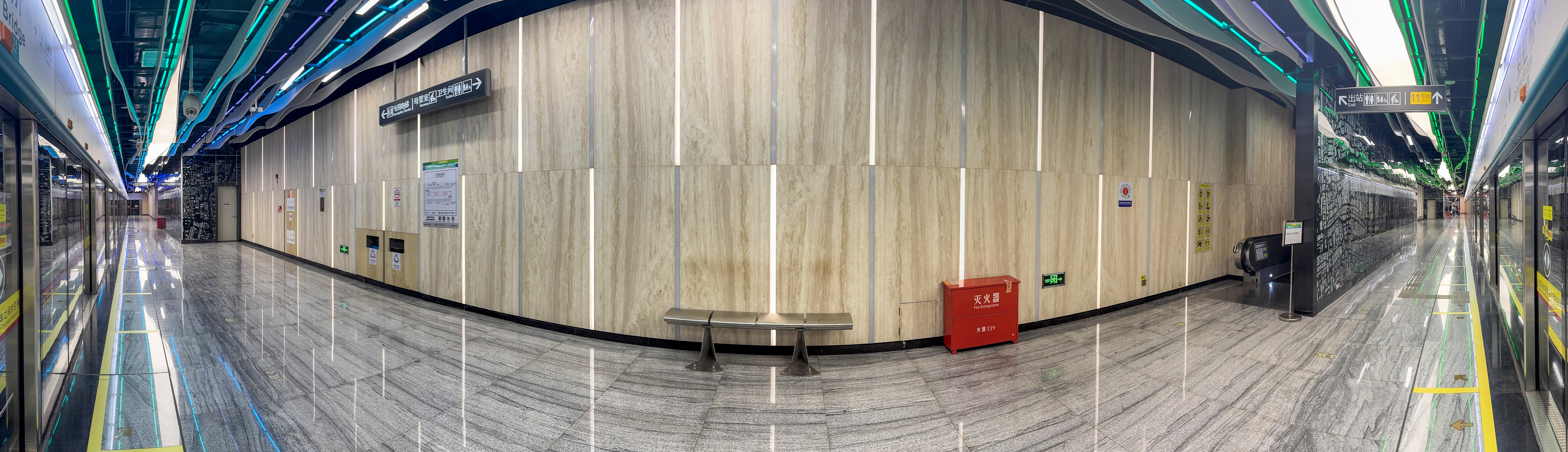
Line 8 platform 4 panorama (alighting platform)

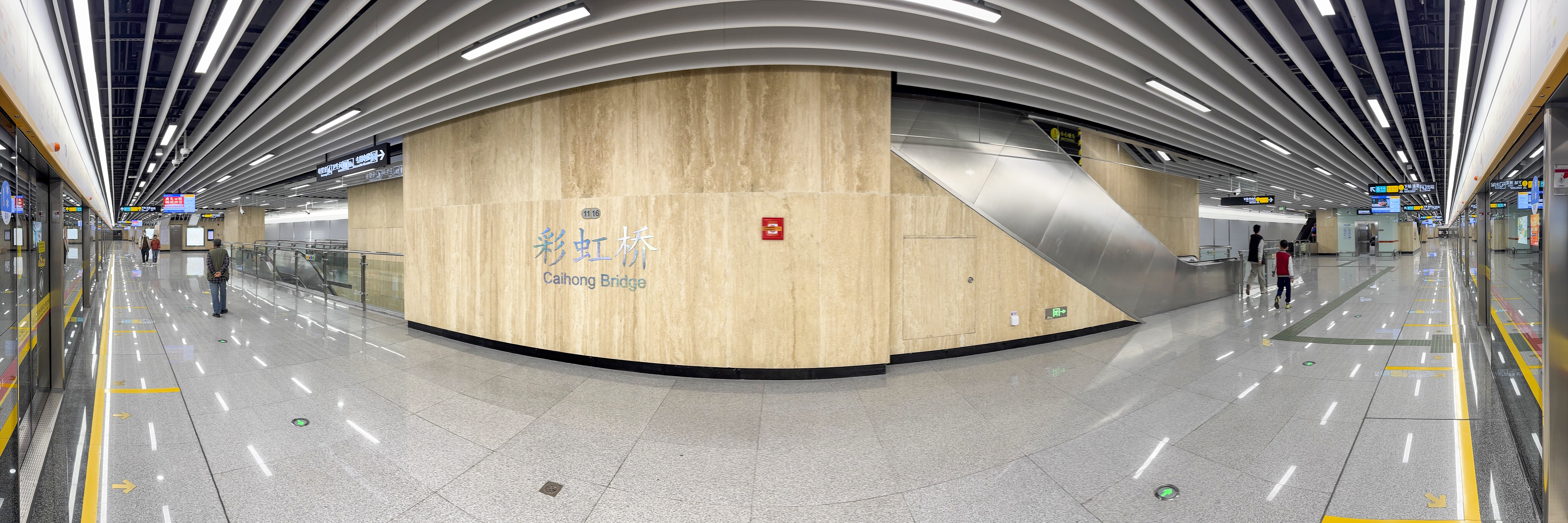
Line 11 platform 5 panorama (Outer Circle platform)

=== Entrances/exits ===
The station has 6 points of entry/exit, of which Exits A, C and D opened with the station's initial opening. When the Line 11/13 station portion opened, Exits F, G and H were opened. Exits A and F are equipped with elevators.

==== South concourse (Line 8) ====
- A: Xihua Road, State Taxation Administration Guangzhou Liwan District Taxation Bureau, Guangzhou No.17 Middle School West Campus
- C: Dongfeng West Road, Guangzhou Municipal Bureau of Ethnic and Religious Affairs, Guangzhou Municipal Cooperation Office
- D: Liwan Road, Caihong Cultural Square, Guangzhou Bureau of Planning and Natural Resources

==== North concourse (Lines 11 and 13) ====
- F: Dongfeng West Road, Liuhua Lake Park South Gate
- G: Dongfeng West Road
- H: Dongfeng West Road
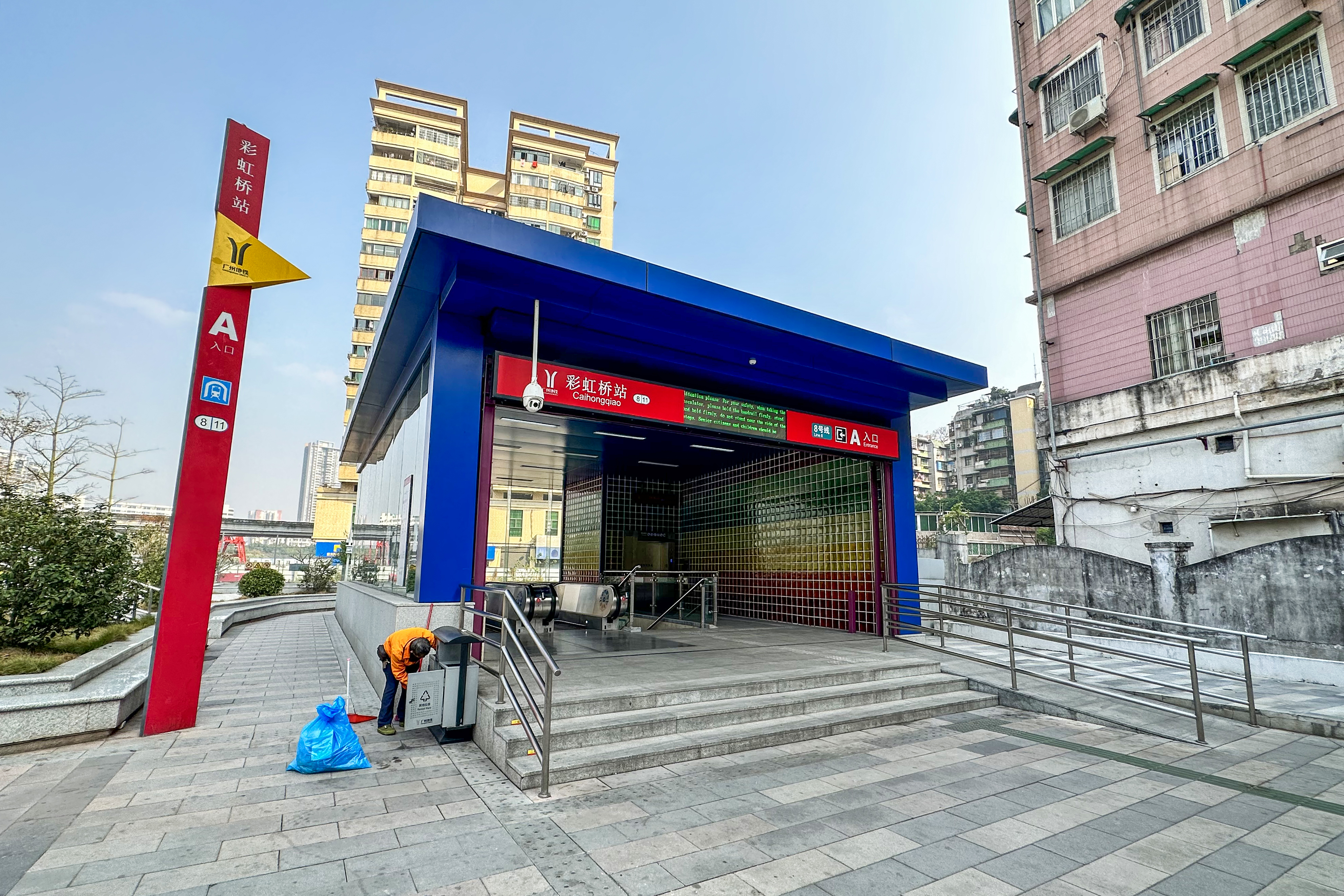
Entrance A

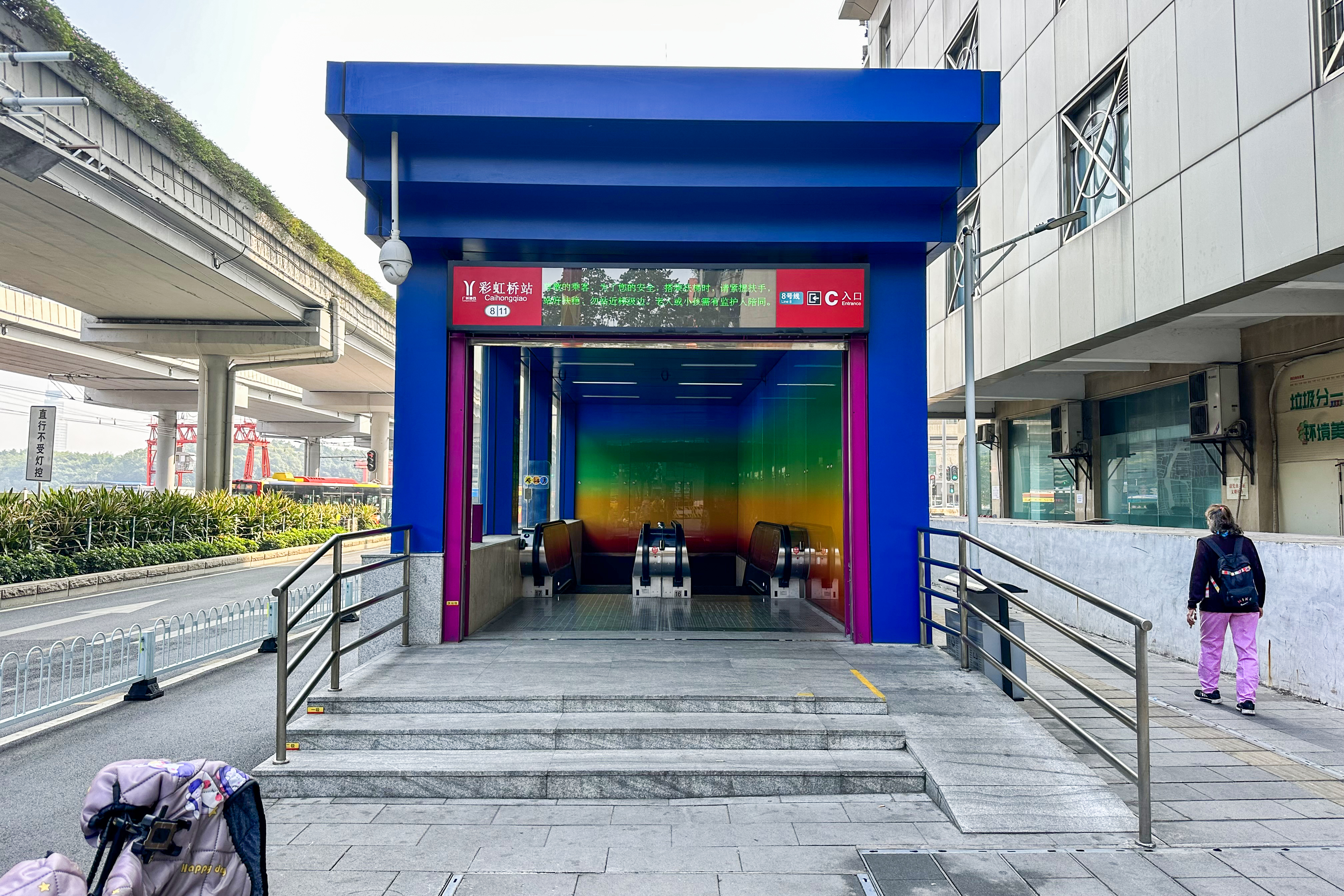
Entrance C

Entrance D

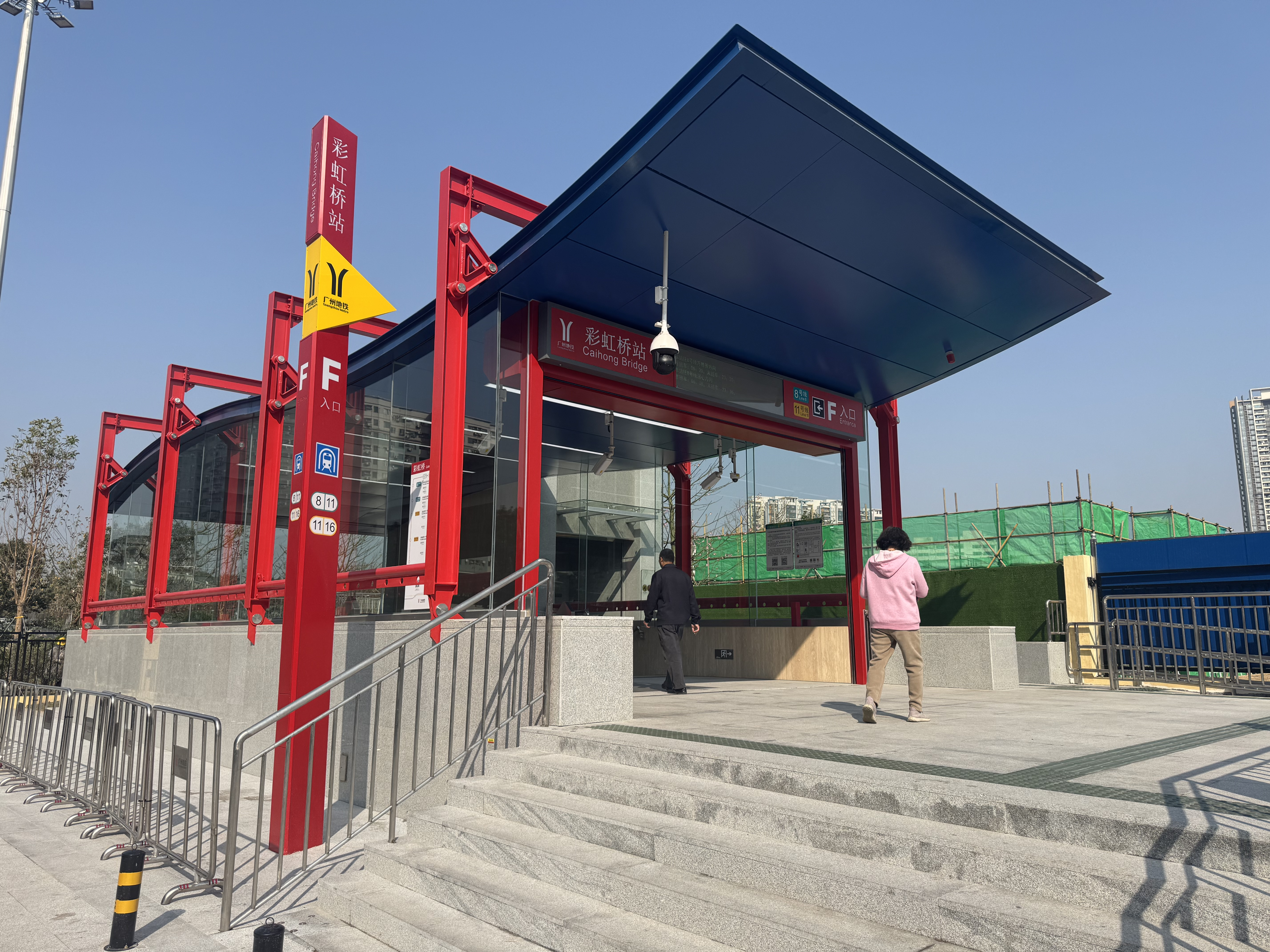
Entrance F

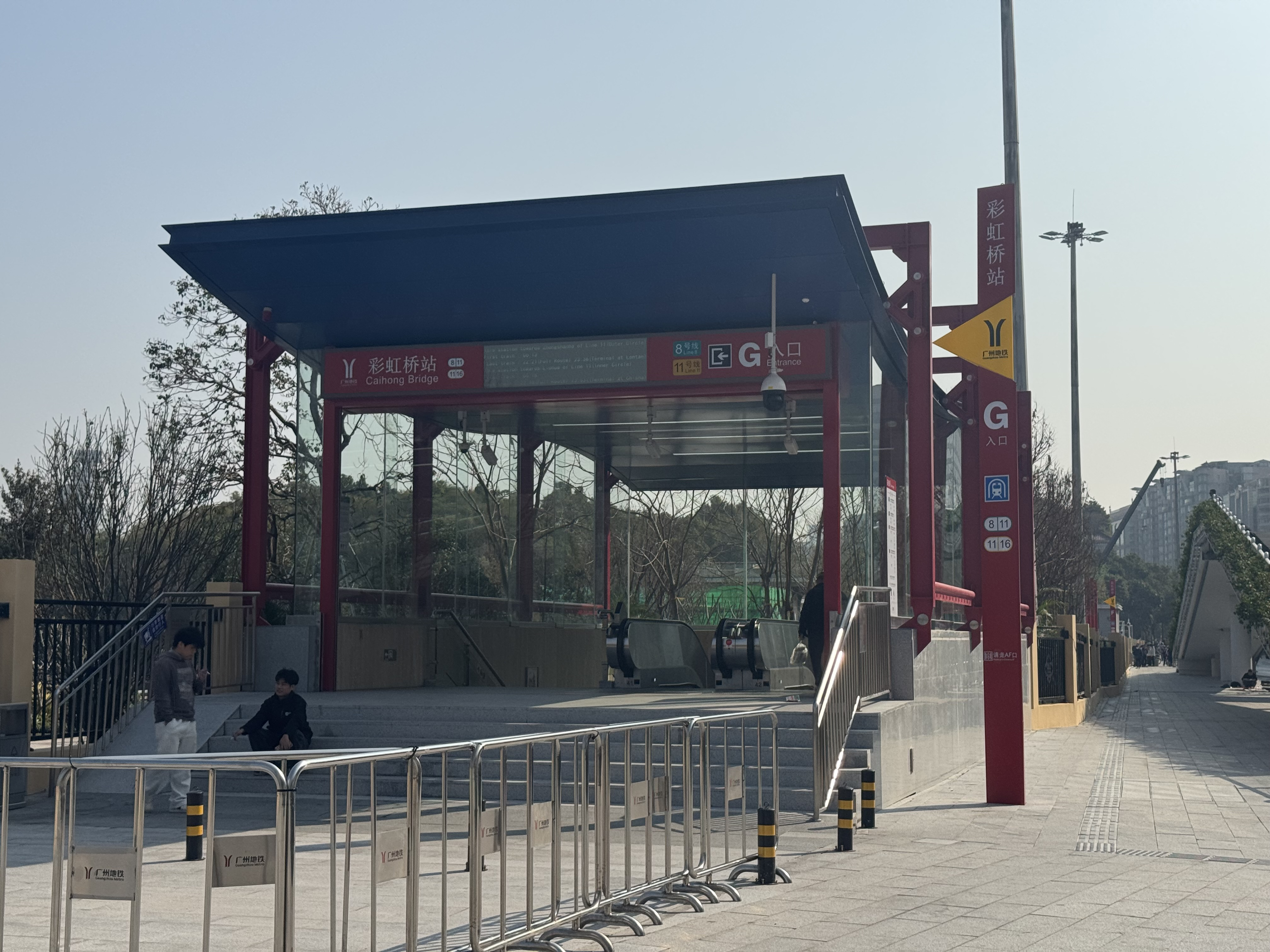
Entrance G

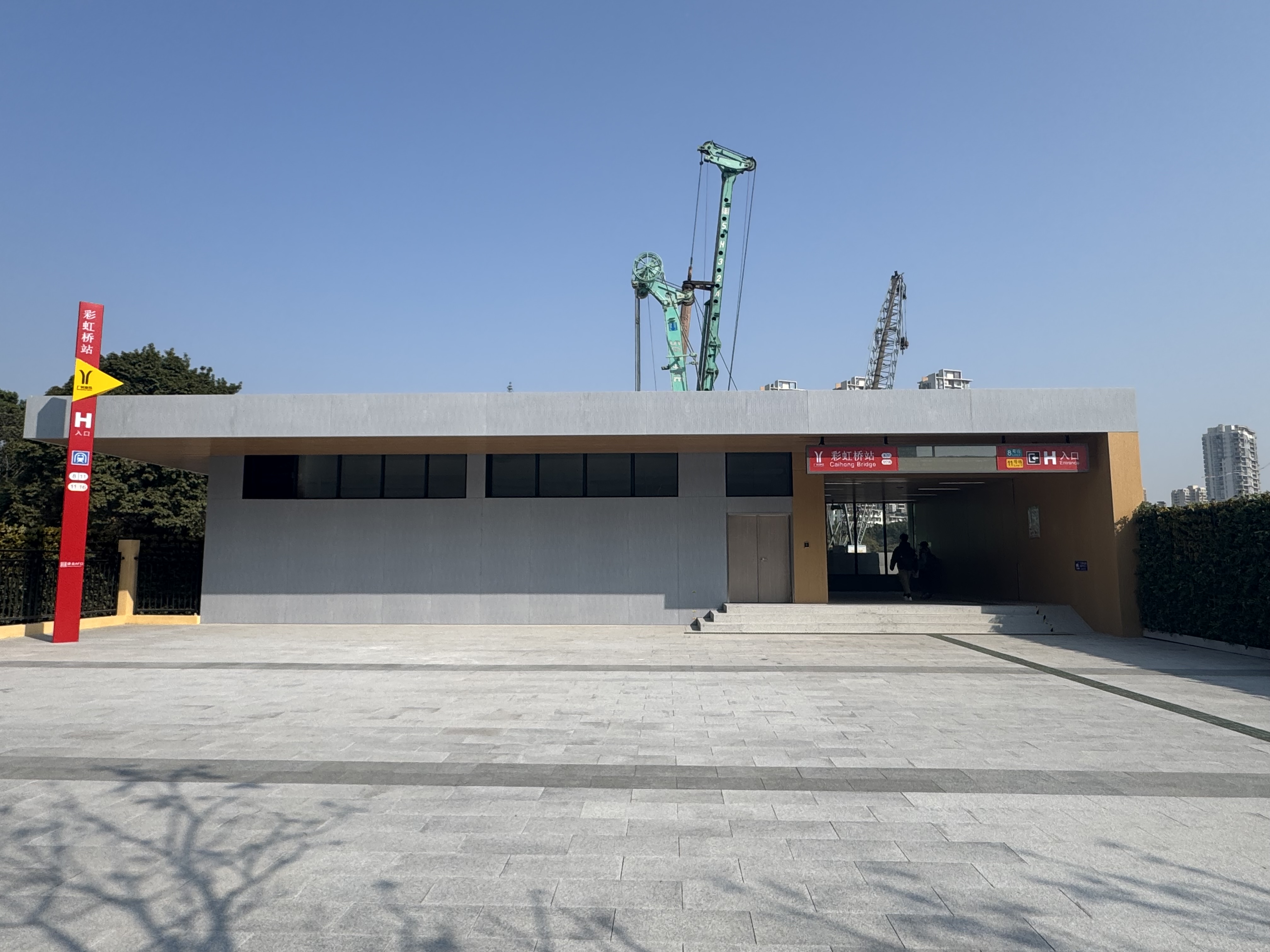
Entrance H

== History ==
=== Construction ===
==== Line 8 ====
On 3 April 2013, the Line 8 station site was officially enclosed for construction, marking the official start of construction of the station. Previously, the Liuhua Bird Garden, which was located in Liuhua Lake Park and was scheduled to become a station construction site, was demolished.

In mid-January 2020, part of the main structure of Line 8 was topped out, making it the last station to be topped out in the northern extension of Line 8. However, it was still not in time to open in November of the same year with the northern extension of Line 8. At that time, only civil works had been completed on the station platform, and there were screen doors, escalators and elevators, as well as the necessary equipment. The speed of Line 8 trains passing through the station had to be reduced, and after the opening of the northern extension of Line 8, there were also multiple sets of shields in front of the screen doors to cover them, so as to prevent passengers on the train from observing the unfinished platform when passing through the station. After removal of the shields following foundational completion, passengers could view the platform as the train passed.

On 17 June 2022, the No. 3 exit of the station was topped out, before transferring to mechanical and electrical construction on 19 June. In September of the same year, the station completed the "three rights" transfer and officially put into service on 28 September.

==== Lines 11 and 13 ====
Construction of the Line 11 and Line 13 station started in July 2017, the main structure was topped out in January 2022, and the "three rights" transfer was completed on 30 July 2024. In July 2026, the platform section of Line 13 entered the operational testing phase.

=== Operation ===
During the COVID-19 pandemic at the end of 2022, the station temporarily closed from 09:00 on 9 November to 12:00 on 14 November 2022 for prevention and control measures.

When the station initially opened, the English name of the station was set as Caihongqiao. On 28 December 2024, Line 11 was opened, and the English name of this station changed to Caihong Bridge simultaneously, and related materials were updated on the eve of the Line 11 opening.

== Future developments ==
Caihong Bridge station will have an interchange with Line 13 Phase 2 by 2026. Cross-platform interchange will be utilised between lines 11 and 13 at 1 level above Line 8. The station will also interchange with Line 22 Northern extension. Paid linkways linking all concourses between all 4 lines will be built at Basement 2 of the whole Caihong Bridge station.

=== Line 22 ===
Line 22 is located on the west side of Liuhua Lake Park, the east side of Guangzhou-Zhanjiang High-speed Railway, and the north side of Dongfeng Road West, directly below Liuhua Road, with 6 exits. Since the original design of the three-line interchange station did not reserve Line 22, the Line 22 station will be connected to the concourse of Line 11 and Line 13 through a transfer passageway of about 300 meters. The Line 22 platform will then be located on the fifth basement level. The authorities plan to carry out the construction of this station in parallel with the reconstruction of the Guangzhou-Zhanjiang High-speed Railway and the renovation of Guangzhou Railway Station between May 2023 and June 2025. From 9 September 2023, the authorities enclosed part of Liuhua Road for construction of the Line 22 station.
