= Huashanzhen railway station =

Railway station in Guangdong, China

Huashanzhen 花山镇
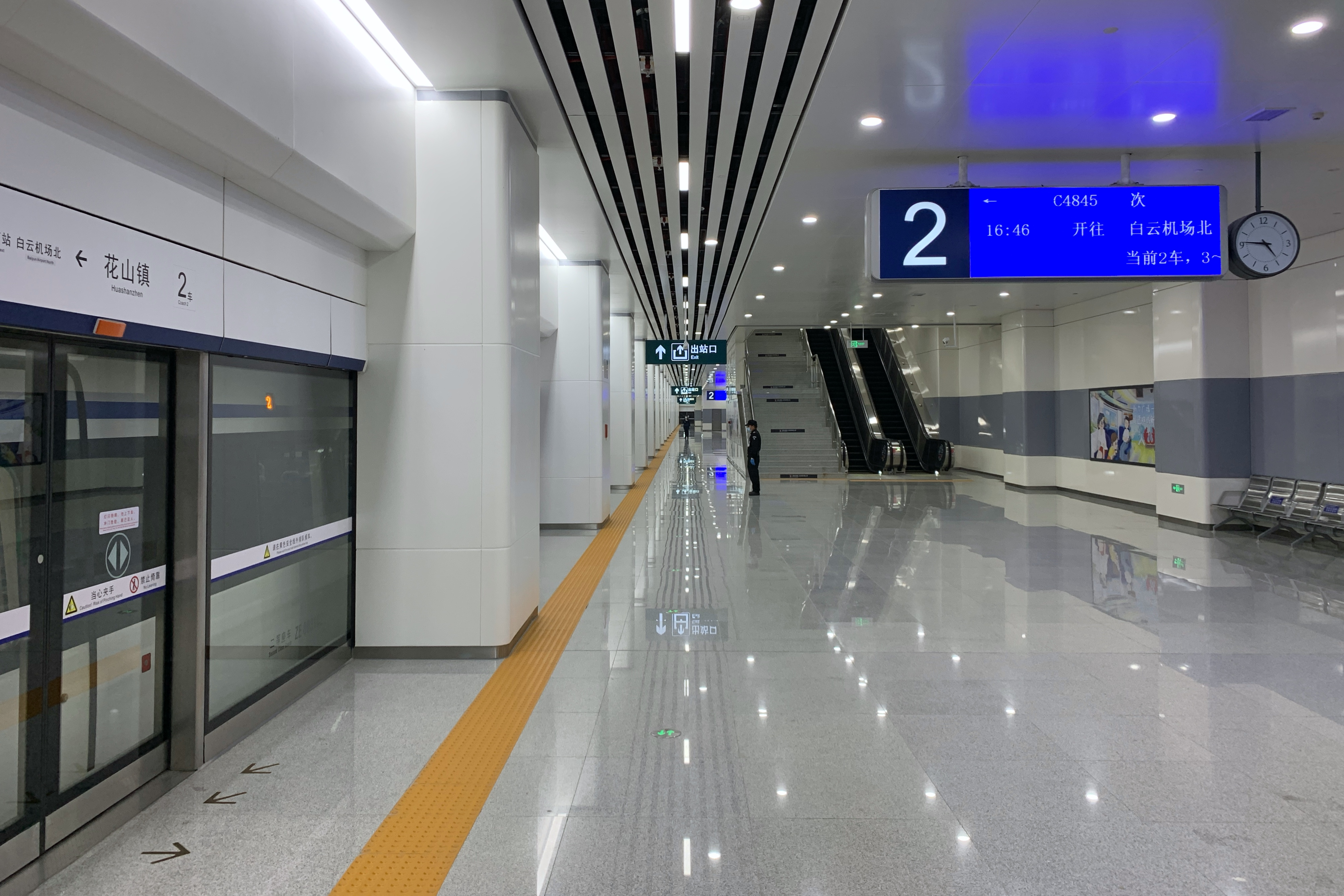
- Platform (towards Baiyun Airport)

General information
- Location: Huadu District, Guangzhou, Guangdong; China
- Coordinates: 23.4280°N 113.2633°E
- Operated by: Guangdong Intercity
- Line: Guangzhou East Ring intercity railway
- Platforms: 2 (2 side platforms)
- Tracks: 4

Construction
- Structure type: Underground
- Accessible: Yes

Other information
- Station code: HZA (Pinyin: HSZ)

History
- Opened: 30 November 2020 (5 years ago)

Services
Preceding station	Pearl River Delta Metropolitan Region Intercity Railway	Following station
Huachengjie towards Huadu	Guangzhou East Ring intercity railway	Baiyun Airport North towards Panyu
Location

Huashanzhen railway station (Chinese: 花山镇站) is an underground railway station located in Huadu District, Guangzhou, Guangdong, China. It opened with the Eastern section of the Guangzhou–Foshan circular intercity railway on 30 November 2020.
