= Huadong, Guangdong =

Huadong 花东镇
- Town
- Location in Guangdong
- Coordinates: 23°26′25″N 113°19′52″E
- Country: People's Republic of China
- Province: Guangdong
- Prefecture-level city: Guangzhou
- District: Huadu District
- Time zone: UTC+8 (China Standard)

Huadu, Guangzhou, Guangdong, China

Huadong (Chinese: 花东) is a town of Huadu District, Guangzhou, Guangdong, China. As of 2018, it has 5 residential communities and 45 villages under its administration.
