= Baiyun Airport North railway station =

Railway station in Guangzhou, China

Baiyun Airport North 白云机场北
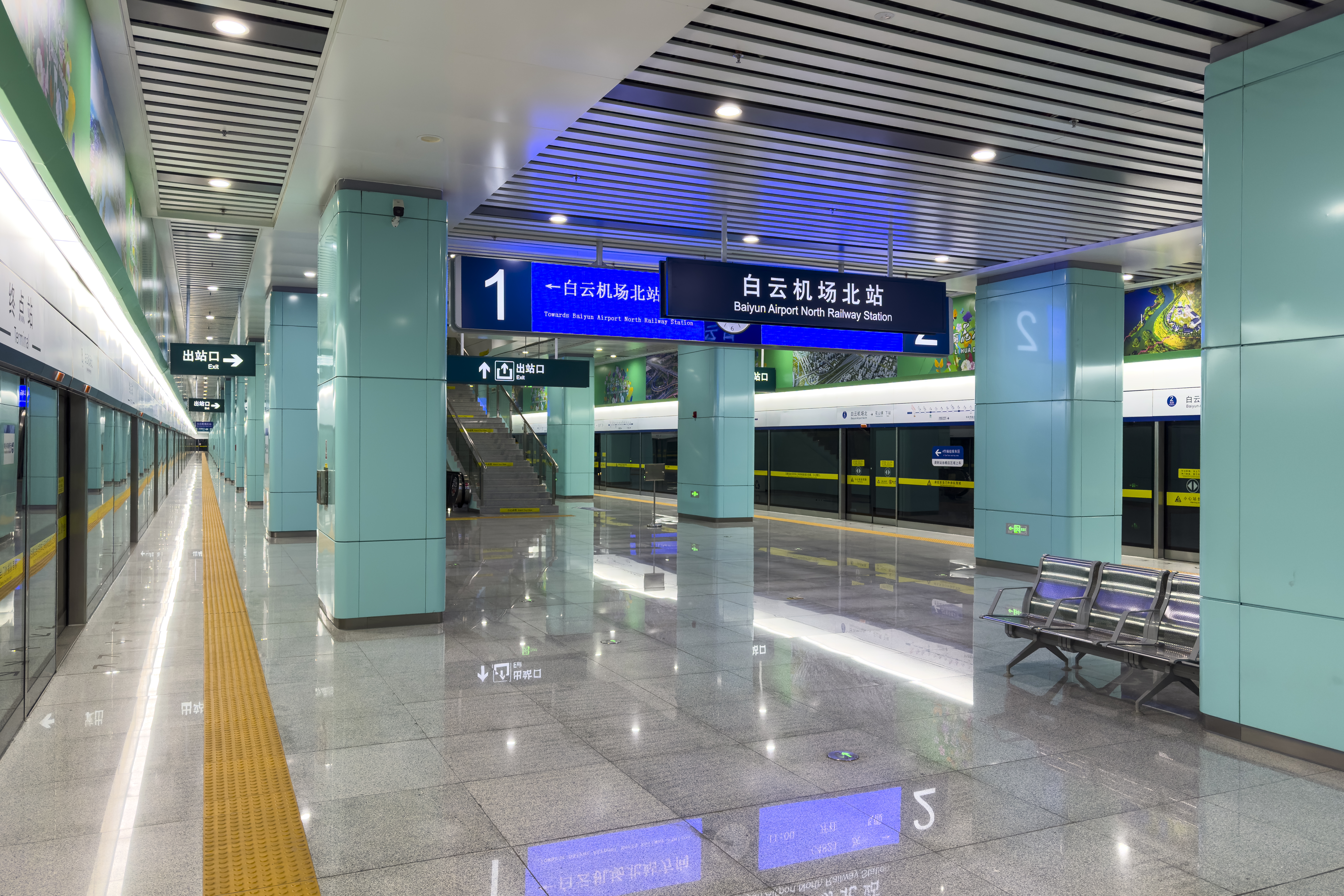
- Platform

General information
- Location: Huadu District, Guangzhou, Guangdong; China
- Coordinates: 23.39755°N 113.30052°E
- Operated by: Guangdong Intercity
- Lines: Guangzhou East Ring intercity railway; Line 3 (via Airport North (Terminal 2))
- Platforms: 2 (1 island platform)
- Connections: Guangzhou Baiyun International Airport (Terminal 2); 3 Airport North (Terminal 2)

Construction
- Structure type: Underground
- Accessible: Yes

Other information
- Station code: BBA (Pinyin: BYB)

History
- Opened: 30 November 2020 (5 years ago)

Services
Preceding station	Pearl River Delta Metropolitan Region Intercity Railway	Following station
Huashanzhen towards Huadu	Guangzhou East Ring intercity railway	Baiyun Airport East towards Panyu
Transfer at Airport North (Terminal 2)
Preceding station	Guangzhou Metro	Following station
Gaozeng towards Haibang	Line 3 transfer at Airport North (Terminal 2)	Terminus
Location

Baiyun Airport North railway station (Chinese: 白云机场北站) is an underground railway station located in Huadu District, Guangzhou, Guangdong, China. It opened with the Eastern section of the Guangzhou–Foshan circular intercity railway on 30 November 2020.

The station serves Guangzhou Baiyun International Airport Terminal 2 and is an interchange with Airport North station on Line 3 of the Guangzhou Metro.
