= Airport North station (Guangzhou Metro) =

Guangzhou Metro station

Coordinates: 23°23′49.61″N 113°18′21.27″E

Airport North (Terminal 2) 机场北（2号航站楼）
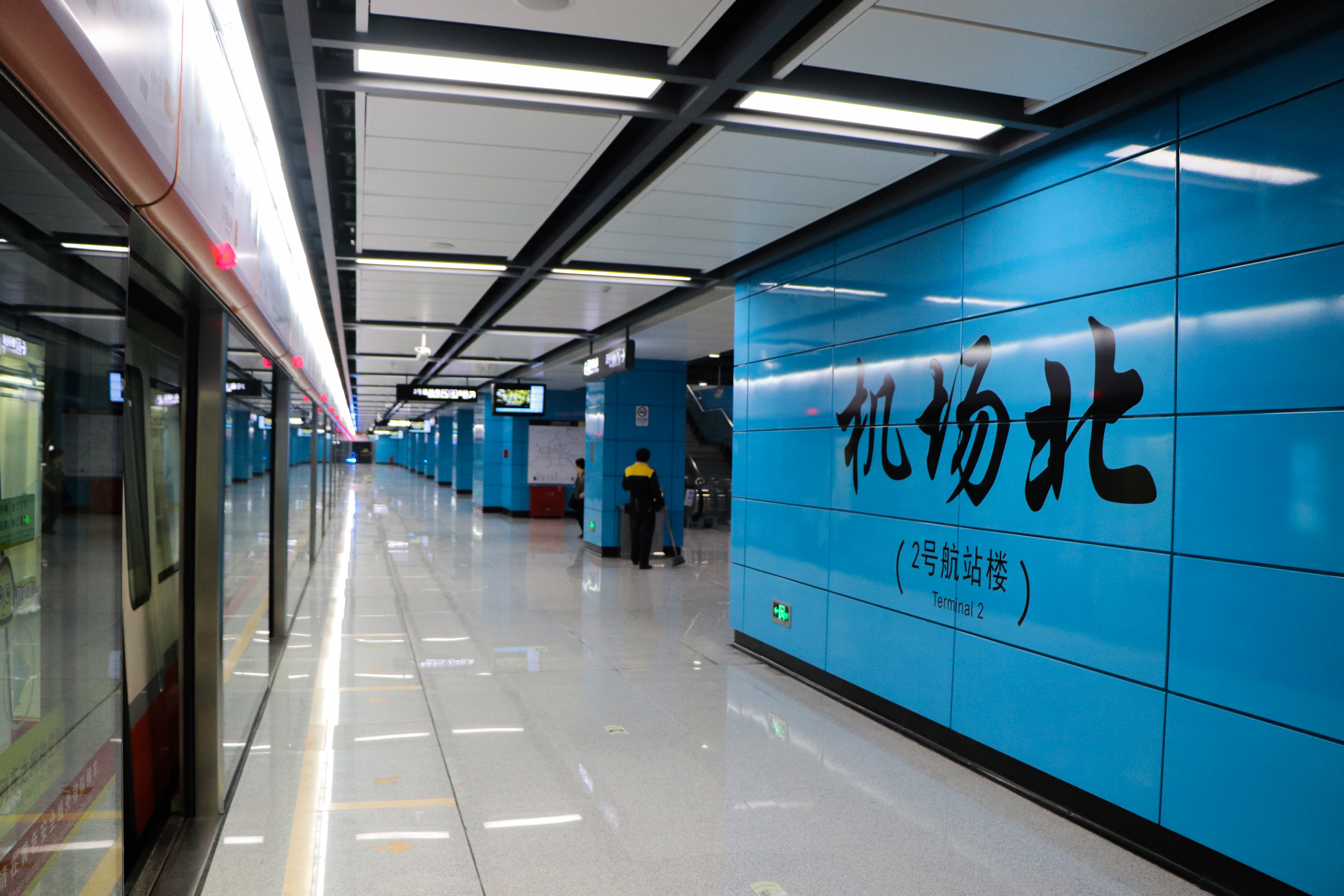
- Platform 1

Chinese name
- Simplified Chinese: 机场北站（2号航站楼）
- Traditional Chinese: 機場北站（2號航站樓）
Transcriptions
Standard Mandarin
- Hanyu Pinyin: Jīchǎng Běi Zhàn (Èrhào Hángzhànlóu)
Yue: Cantonese
- Yale Romanization: Gēichèuhng Bāk Jaahm (Yihhouh Hòhngjaahmlàuh)
- Jyutping: Gei^{1}coeng^{4} Bak^{1} Zaam^{6} (Ji^{6}hou^{6} Hong^{4}zaam^{6}lau^{4})

General information
- Location: Huadu District, Guangzhou, Guangdong; China
- Operated by: Guangzhou Metro Co. Ltd.
- Lines: Line 3; Guangzhou East Ring intercity railway (via Baiyun Airport North)
- Platforms: 2 (2 side platforms)
- Connections: Guangzhou Baiyun International Airport (Terminal 2); Baiyun Airport North

Construction
- Structure type: Underground

Other information
- Station code: 330

History
- Opened: 26 April 2018; 8 years ago

Services
| Preceding station | Guangzhou Metro | Following station |
|---|---|---|
| Gaozeng towards Haibang | Line 3 | Terminus |
Transfer at Baiyun Airport North
| Preceding station | Pearl River Delta Metropolitan Region Intercity Railway | Following station |
| Huashanzhen towards Huadu | Guangzhou East Ring intercity railway transfer at Baiyun Airport North | Baiyun Airport East towards Panyu |
Location

Airport North (Terminal 2) station (simplified Chinese: 机场北站（2号航站楼）; traditional Chinese: 機場北站（2號航站樓）; Cantonese Yale: Gēichèuhng Bāk Jaahm (Yihhouh Hòhngjaahmlàuh)), is a station and northern terminus of Line 3 of the Guangzhou Metro. It started operations on 26 April 2018 following the opening of Guangzhou Baiyun International Airport's Terminal 2. It is located right under the airport terminal and the station has an escalator connecting the station directly with the check-in area of Terminal 2 of the Guangzhou Baiyun Airport.

== Station layout ==
| G | Street level | Exit |
| L1; Concourse | Lobby | Customer Service, Shops, Vending machines, ATMs |
| L2; Platforms | Side platform, doors will open on the right |
| L2; Platforms | Platform 1 | 3 towards Haibang (Gaozeng) |
| L2; Platforms | Platform 2 | 3 termination platform |
| L2; Platforms | Side platform, doors will open on the right |
