= Guangzhou Metro =

Rapid transit railway in Guangzhou, China

Coordinates: 23.1089°N 113.2647°E

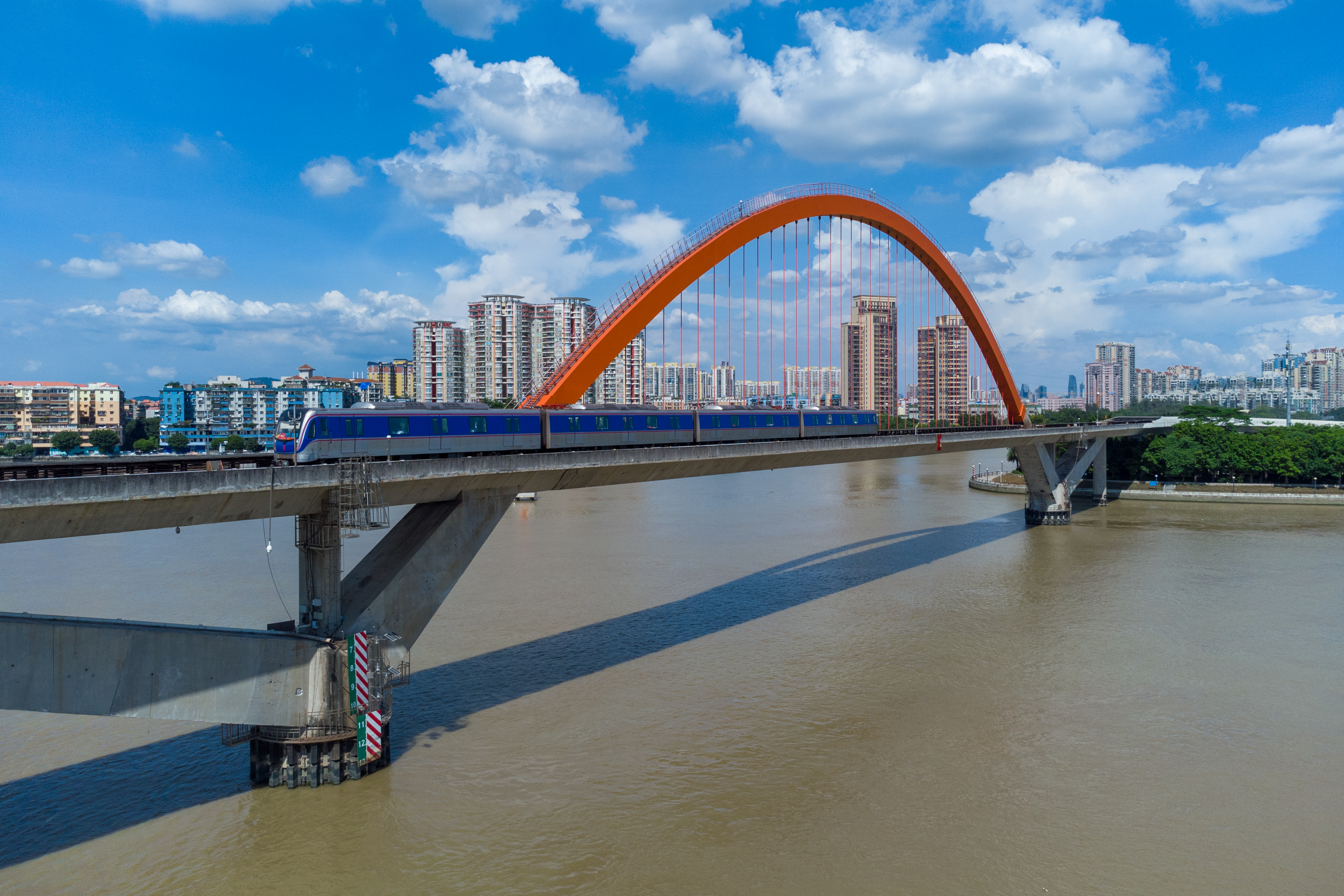
- A Line 6 train on the Jinshazhou Pearl River Bridge

Overview
- Owner: Guangzhou Municipal People's Government (广州市人民政府)
- Locale: Guangzhou; Foshan
- Transit type: Rapid transit
- Number of lines: 19
- Number of stations: 399
- Daily ridership: 9.312 million (2025 avg.); 14.093 million (31 December 2025)
- Annual ridership: 3.02431 billion (2025)
- Website: GZMtr.com

Operation
- Began operation: 28 June 1997; 29 years ago
- Operator: Guangzhou Metro Corporation (广州地铁集团有限公司)
- Number of vehicles: 814 trains (as of 2024)

Technical
- System length: 779.9 km (484.6 mi)
- Track gauge: 1,435 mm (4 ft 8 1/2 in) standard gauge
- Minimum radius of curvature: 206 m (676 ft)
- Electrification: Overhead line, 1,500 V DC (Note: Line 1, Line 2, Line 3, Line 7, Line 8, Line 9, Line 10, Line 11, Line 12, Line 13 and Guangfo Line) and 25 kV 50 Hz AC (Note: Line 18 and Line 22); Third rail, 1,500 V DC (Note: Line 4, Line 5, Line 6, Line 14 and Line 21. Overhead lines with same voltage used in the depots.) and 600 V 50 Hz 3-phase AC (Note: APM Line)
System map
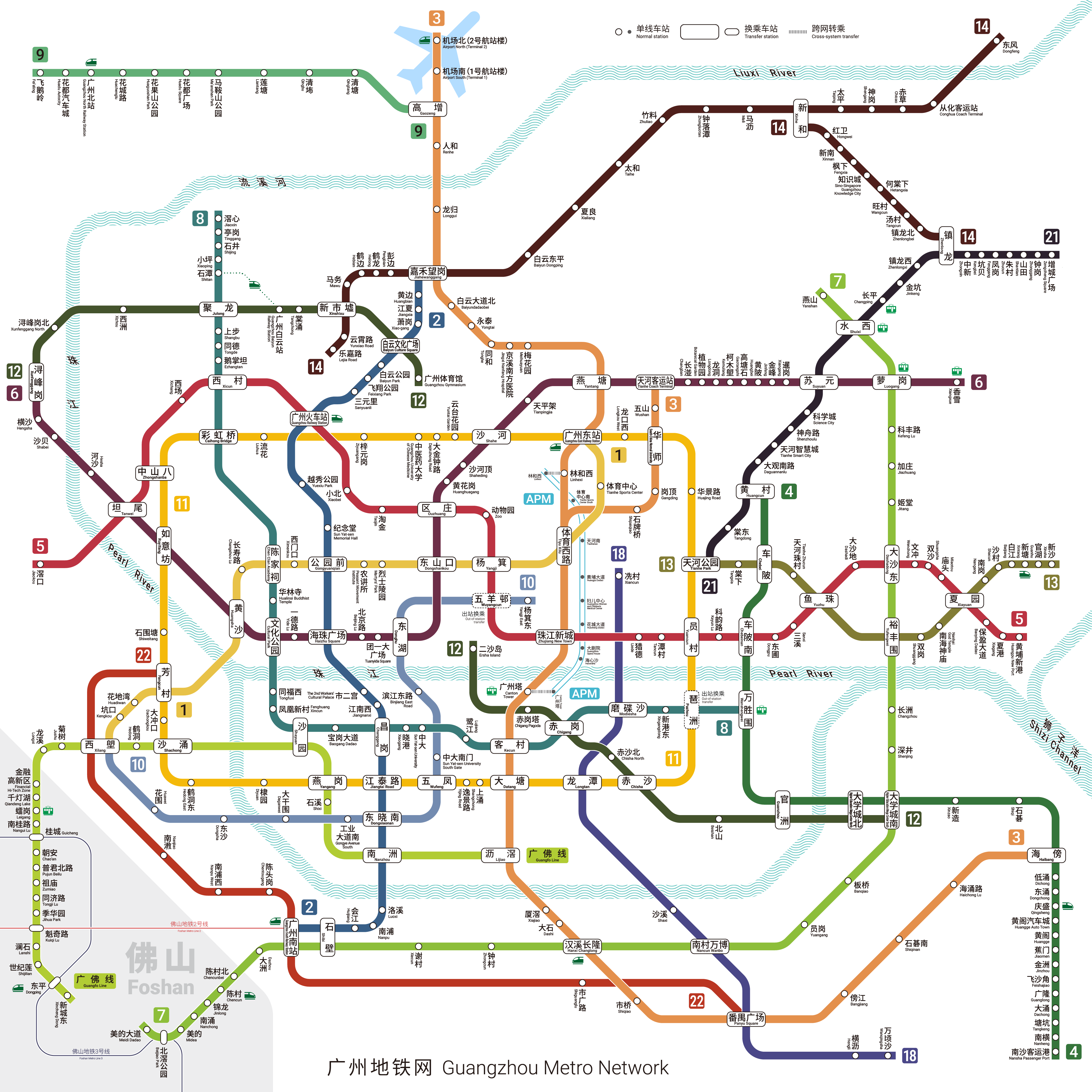

Guangzhou Metro
- Simplified Chinese: 广州地铁
- Traditional Chinese: 廣州地鐵
- Jyutping: gwong^{2} zau^{1} dei^{6} tit^{3}
- Cantonese Yale: Gwóngjàu Deihtit
- Hanyu Pinyin: Guǎngzhōu Dìtiě
Transcriptions
Standard Mandarin
- Hanyu Pinyin: Guǎngzhōu Dìtiě
Yue: Cantonese
- Yale Romanization: Gwóngjàu Deihtit
- Jyutping: gwong^{2} zau^{1} dei^{6} tit^{3}

The Guangzhou Metro (Chinese: 广州地铁; pinyin: Guǎngzhōu Dìtiě; Jyutping: Gwong^{2}zau^{1} Dei^{6}tit^{3}) is the rapid transit system of Guangzhou, the capital city of Guangdong, China. It is operated by the state-owned Guangzhou Metro Corporation and was the fourth metro system to be built in China, after Beijing, Tianjin, and Shanghai.

The earliest efforts to build an underground rapid transit system in Guangzhou date back to 1960. In the two decades that followed, the project was brought into the agenda five times but ended up abandoned each time due to financial and technical difficulties. Preparation of what would lead to today's Guangzhou Metro did not start until the 1980s, and it was not until 1993 that construction of Line 1 officially began. Line 1 opened four years later in 1997 with five stations in operation.

As of 29 June 2025, Guangzhou Metro has 19 lines in operation: Line 1, Line 2, Line 3, Line 4, Line 5, Line 6, Line 7, Line 8, Line 9, Line 10, Line 11, Line 12, Line 13, Line 14, Line 18, Line 21, Line 22, Guangfo Line, and Zhujiang New Town APM reaching both the urban core and surrounding suburbs. Guangfo Line connects Guangzhou and Foshan and is the first metro line between two cities in the country. Daily service hours start at 6:00 am and end at midnight and daily ridership averages over 7 million. Having delivered 3.029 billion rides in 2018, Guangzhou Metro is the third busiest metro system in the world and the 3rd largest in terms of length, after the metro systems of Beijing and Shanghai. Guangzhou Metro operates 399 stations (Note: 317 stations if interchange stations are counted once. Nonoperational stations are not included.) and 779.9 km (484.6 mi) of lines.

Extensive development of the metro network has been planned for the next decade, with construction started on Line 24 and pre-construction preparations on Line 28. Extensions of Line 8, Line 10, Line 12, Line 13, Line 14, Line 18, as well as the extension of Line 22 to Baiyun Airport are in the works.

Some of the system's lines were designed to operate much faster than traditional metro lines, with stations far apart and faster trainsets regularly running at 160 kilometres per hour (99 mph). Lines 18 and 22 are the fastest metro lines in China, a title previously held by Line 11 of the Shenzhen Metro.

== History ==
=== Forays of the 1960s and 1970s ===
A city cannot be modernized without a metro system!

— Chen Yu, Governor of Guangdong 1957–1967 (Note: The original text was "一个城市，没有地铁就没有现代化！".)

Chen Yu (Chinese: 陈郁), Governor of Guangdong in 1957–1967, was the first to have proposed an underground metro system for Guangzhou. In the summer of 1960, he ordered a secret geological survey of groundwater levels of Guangzhou. Six holes with an accumulated depth of 1980 m were drilled in the karst and alluvial plains in the city. The geological conditions of Guangzhou, despite their complexity, did not preclude the possibility of an underground metro system. Analysis of the survey data resulted in a confidential report titled Geological Survey for Guangzhou Underground Railway Project dated July 1961, the earliest one of such reports.

In 1965, Chen Yu along with Tao Zhu (陶铸), who had been the Governor of Guangdong and First Secretary of Guangdong Committee of the Chinese Communist Party, proposed in the wake of the Gulf of Tonkin incident that a tunnel is built in Guangzhou for wartime evacuations and post-war metro development. Approved by the central government, the project started in the spring of 1965. Due to its confidentiality in the context of intensification of the Vietnam War, the project adopted the obscure name of "Project Nine" (九号工程), where "Nine" was the number of strokes in "地下", the Chinese word for "underground".

As envisaged by Chen Yu, the metro system of Guangzhou would consist of two lines: a north–south line that would connect Nanfang Building to Sanyuanli via Renmin Lu and Jiefang Beilu, and an east–west line that would run from Xichang to Dongshan along today's Dongfeng Lu. The two lines roughly parallelled Line 2 and Line 1 of the modern days, respectively. The east–west line was never built, while Project Nine was dedicated to the north–south line. Over ten teams of miners were recruited for a project filled with hazards and perils. Constrained by extreme scarcity of time, monetary and material resources, the ambition to build a tunnel for the metro operation was scaled back— the capability to run trolleybuses was deemed acceptable. For ¥13 million, an 8 km (5.0 mi) long tunnel was completed in 1966. The tunnel was planned to be used as an air-raid shelter and eventual metro line; however, with a cross-section merely 3 m wide and 2.85 m tall, and exposed rocks and wooden trestles scattered everywhere, it was unusable for public transit. In the two decades that followed, four attempts were made to revive and expand Project Nine, first in 1970, next in 1971, then in 1974, and last in 1979. Due to lack of funds and complex geotechnical conditions, none of these efforts materialized.

=== Construction of Line 1 ===
The metro project of Guangzhou was launched for the sixth time in 1984 as the Preparation Office of Guangzhou Metro, established back in 1979 as part of the last attempt to resurrect Project Nine, was moved out of the civil air-defense system and became a subordinate body of the Construction Commission of Guangzhou, bringing Guangzhou Metro into the scope of urban infrastructure development. Before the 1980s, war preparedness was the dominant tenet of underground infrastructure projects in mainland China. The construction of Guangzhou Metro marked the first deviation from the old doctrine as traffic itself became the prime consideration of the project.

Metro network design of Guangzhou selected in 1988

The design of the initial metro network was a collaborative effort between China and France (SYSTRA). Four tentative designs were published on 14 March 1988 edition of Guangzhou Daily. From the four designs, one was selected based on expert and mass feedback. The selected design, featuring two intersecting lines, was the baseline typology for today's Line 1 and Line 2.

Construction of Line 1 officially commenced on 28 December 1993, although work on a trial section at Huangsha had begun in October 1992, five months before the feasibility study of the line was ratified by the State Planning Commission (Note: The State Planning Commission has since evolved into the National Development and Reform Commission.) in March 1993. Various technologies novel to China's construction industry at the time were adopted in different sections of the project, notably including immersed tubes (Pearl River Tunnel) and tunnel boring machines (Huangsha–Martyrs' Park section). As the most massive urban infrastructure project in the history of Guangzhou, Line 1 required funding of ¥12.75 billion, all of which was raised by the local government. Use of cut-and-cover tunnels aggressively backed by then-mayor Li Ziliu necessitated the relocation of approximately 100,000 residents in 20,000 households and demolition of buildings totalling 1.1 km^{2} (0.42 sq mi) in the area and earned Li the nickname "Li the Demolisher" (Yue Chinese: 黎拆樓, romanized: lai^{4} caak^{3} lau^{2}).

Three and a half years after construction started, the 5.4 km (3.4 mi) section from Xilang to Huangsha opened for trial operation on 28 June 1997. The remaining 13 km (8.1 mi), from Huangsha to Guangzhou East railway station, was completed eighteen months later on 28 December 1998. The entire line opened for sightseeing tours between 16 February and 2 March 1999, delivering 1.39 million rides 15 days before closing for final testing. Operation of Line 1 officially began on 28 June 1999, 34 years after the start of Project Nine in 1965.

=== Accelerated expansion in the 2000s ===
Evolution of Guangzhou Metro (1997-2018)

The success of Line 1 as a turnkey project acquired from Siemens with 100% imported electromechanical equipment prompted a wave of similar proposals from twelve other cities in mainland China toward the end of the 1990s. The fever for import-centric rapid transit caused the State Planning Committee to temporarily halt approval of rapid transit projects nationwide and regulate the localization rates of rolling stock suppliers. Amid tightened regulation, only Line 2 of Guangzhou Metro received the immediate green light to proceed in June 1998 on the condition that at least 60% of its electromechanical equipment must be sourced domestically.

Construction of Line 2 started in July 1998. Rolling stock manufacturer Bombardier airlifted the first two train cars in an An-124 from Berlin to Guangzhou in November 2002 after schedule delays. (Note: The supplier had been Changchun Adtranz Railway Vehicles, a Sino-German joint venture. Bombardier assumed Adtranz's position after acquiring the latter soon after the deal with Guangzhou Metro was signed.) The first section, from Sanyuanli to Xiaogang opened on 29 December 2002; the remaining section from Xiaogang to Pazhou opened on 28 June 2003. At ¥2.13 billion, the equipment cost of Line 2 was 53% lower than that of Line 1. This demonstrated the feasibility of cost reduction through procurement of domestic equipment, revealing a path to project approval to other Chinese cities and reigniting their aspirations to own a rapid transit system.

The renewed craze for rapid transit across the country soon encountered a new round of tightened control on project approval around 2003. But Guangzhou was exempted along with Beijing, Shanghai and Shenzhen. By the time Line 2 was completed, construction of Line 3, Line 4, and Guangfo Line had been underway, among which only Guangfo Line later fell to stringent regulation of approvals.

== Timeline ==
| Line | Terminals | Commencement | Length km | Station(s) | Name |
|---|---|---|---|---|---|
| 1 | Xilang — Huangsha | 28 June 1997 | 5.4 km (3.36 mi) | 5 | Initial section |
| 1 | Huangsha — Guangzhou East Railway Station | 16 February 1999 | 13.1 km (8.14 mi) | 11 | Final section |
| 2 | Xiaogang — Sanyuanli | 29 December 2002 | 8.9 km (5.53 mi) | 9 | Initial section |
| 2 | Pazhou — Xiaogang | 28 June 2003 | 9 km (5.59 mi) | 7 | Pazhou extension |
| 2 | Wanshengwei — Pazhou | 26 December 2005 | 1.8 km (1.12 mi) | 1 | Wanshengwei extension |
| 3 | Kecun — Guangzhou East Railway Station | 26 December 2005 | 7.8 km (4.85 mi) | 5 | Northern section |
| 4 | Xinzao — Wanshengwei | 26 December 2005 | 16.2 km (10.07 mi) | 5 | 1st section |
| 3 | Panyu Square — Kecun | 30 December 2006 | 19.6 km (12.18 mi) | 7 | Southern section |
| 3 | Tiyu Xilu — Tianhe Coach Terminal | 30 December 2006 | 7.5 km (4.66 mi) | 5 | Spur section |
| 4 | Huangge — Xinzao | 30 December 2006 | 22.3 km (13.86 mi) | 6 | 2nd section |
| 4 | Jinzhou — Huangge | 28 June 2007 | 5.1 km (3.17 mi) | 2 | 3rd section |
| 4 | Wanshengwei — Chebeinan | 28 December 2009 | 3.8 km (2.36 mi) | 1 | Line 4 & 5 connector project |
| 5 | Jiaokou — Wenchong | 28 December 2009 | 31.9 km (19.82 mi) | 24 | Initial phase |
| 2 | Xiaogang — Wanshengwei | 21 September 2010 | −10.8 km (−6.71 mi) | -9 | Line 2 & 8 realignment project |
| 2 | Sanyuanli — Jiahewanggang | 25 September 2010 | 10.3 km (6.40 mi) | 7 | Realignment northern extension |
| 2 | Guangzhou South Railway Station — Jiangnanxi | 25 September 2010 | 12.7 km (7.89 mi) | 9 | Realignment southern section |
| 4 | Chebeinan — Huangcun | 25 September 2010 | 2 km (1.24 mi) | 2 | Northern section |
| 8 | Xiaogang — Wanshengwei | 25 September 2010 | 10.8 km (6.71 mi) | 9 | Line 2 & 8 realignment project |
| 8 | Changgang — Xiaogang | 25 September 2010 | 0.6 km (0.37 mi) | 1 | Line 2 & 8 realignment project |
| 3 | Airport South — Guangzhou East Railway Station | 30 October 2010 | 29.3 km (18.21 mi) | 10 | Northern extension |
| 8 | Fenghuang Xincheng — Changgang | 3 November 2010 | 4.4 km (2.73 mi) | 3 | Line 2 & 8 realignment project |
| Guangfo | Kuiqi Lu — Xilang | 3 November 2010 | 20.4 km (12.68 mi) | 14 | Phase 1 (1st section) |
| APM | Canton Tower — Linhexi | 8 November 2010 | 4 km (2.49 mi) | 8 | Initial phase |
| APM | Haixinsha opens | 24 February 2011 | — | 1 | Infill station |
| 6 | Xunfenggang — Changban | 28 December 2013 | 24.5 km (15.22 mi) | 20 | Phase 1 |
| 6 | Yide Lu opens | 28 January 2015 | — | 1 | Infill station |
| Guangfo | Xilang — Yangang | 28 December 2015 | 7.3 km (4.54 mi) | 4 | Phase 1 (2nd section) |
| 6 | Changban — Xiangxue | 28 December 2016 | 17.2 km (10.69 mi) | 8 | Phase 2 |
| 7 | Guangzhou South Railway Station — Higher Education Mega Center South | 28 December 2016 | 18.6 km (11.56 mi) | 9 | Phase 1 |
| Guangfo | Xincheng Dong — Kuiqi Lu | 28 December 2016 | 6.7 km (4.16 mi) | 4 | Phase 2 |
| 6 | Botanical Garden & Kemulang opens | 28 June 2017 | — | 2 | Infill station |
| 3 | Gaozeng opens | 28 December 2017 | — | 1 | Infill station |
| 4 | Nansha Passenger Port — Jinzhou | 28 December 2017 | 13.64 km (8.48 mi) | 6 | Southern extension |
| 4 | Qingsheng opens | 28 December 2017 | — | 1 | Infill station |
| 9 | Fei’eling — Gaozeng | 28 December 2017 | 20.1 km (12.49 mi) | 10 | Phase 1 |
| 13 | Yuzhu — Xinsha | 28 December 2017 | 25.61 km (15.91 mi) | 11 | Phase 1 |
| 14 | Xinhe — Zhenlong | 28 December 2017 | 21.01 km (13.06 mi) | 10 | Knowledge City line |
| 3 | Airport North — Airport South | 26 April 2018 | 1.23 km (0.76 mi) | 1 | Airport extension |
| 9 | Qingtang opens | 30 June 2018 | — | 1 | Infill station |
| 14 | Jiahewanggang — Dongfeng | 28 December 2018 | 54.28 km (33.73 mi) | 12 | Phase 1 |
| 21 | Zhenglongxi — Zhencheng Square | 28 December 2018 | 26.2 km (16.28 mi) | 9 | Eastern section |
| Guangfo | Yangang — Lijiao | 28 December 2018 | 5.5 km (3.42 mi) | 3 | Phase 1 (3rd section) |
| 21 | Yuancun — Zhenlongxi | 20 December 2019 | 35.3 km (21.93 mi) | 12 | Western section |
| 8 | Cultural Park — Fenghuang Xincun | 28 December 2019 | 1.8 km (1.12 mi) | 1 | Line 2 & 8 connector project |
| 8 | Jiaoxin — Cultural Park | 26 November 2020 | 16.3 km (10.13 mi) | 11 | Northern extension |
| 18 | Xiancun — Wanqingsha | 28 September 2021 | 58.3 km (36.23 mi) | 8 | Phase 1 |
| 22 | Chentougang — Panyu Square | 31 March 2022 | 18.2 km (11.31 mi) | 4 | Phase 1 |
| 7 | Meidi Dadao — Guangzhou South Railway Station | 1 May 2022 | 13.4 km (8.33 mi) | 8 | Phase 1 (western extension) |
| 8 | Caihong Bridge opens | 28 September 2022 | — | 1 | Infill station |
| 8 | Xicun opens | 28 December 2022 | — | 1 | Infill station |
| 5 | Wenchong — Huangpu New Port | 28 December 2023 | 9.8 km (6.09 mi) | 6 | Eastern extension |
| 7 | Higher Education Mega Center South — Yanshan | 28 December 2023 | 22.2 km (13.79 mi) | 10 | Phase 2 |
| 21 | Yuancun — Tianhe Park (closed) | 2 October 2024 | −1.37 km (−0.85 mi) | -1 | Converting to Line 11 section per initial design |
| 3 | Panyu Square — Haibang | 1 November 2024 | 9.6 km (5.97 mi) | 4 | Eastern extension |
| 6 | Shahe opens | 28 December 2024 | — | 1 | Infill station |
| 11 | Chisha — Tianhe Park — Chisha | 28 December 2024 | 44.2 km (27.46 mi) | 29 | Full circular line |
| 10 | Xilang — Yangji East | 29 June 2025 | 17.2 km (10.69 mi) | 11 | Initial section |
| 12 | Xunfenggang — Guangzhou Gymnasium | 29 June 2025 | 27.9 km (17.34 mi) | 9 | Western section |
| 12 | Ersha Island — Higher Education Mega Center South | 29 June 2025 | 27.9 km (17.34 mi) | 8 | Eastern section |
| 11 | Guangzhou East Railway Station opens | 29 September 2025 | — | 1 | Infill station |
| 13 | Tianhe Park — Yuzhu | 29 September 2025 | 8.6 km (5.34 mi) | 4 | Phase 2 (initial section) |
| 14 | Lejia Road — Jiahewanggang | 29 September 2025 | 8.8 km (5.47 mi) | 7 | Phase 2 |
| 10 | Sun Yat-Sen University South Gate opens | 29 December 2025 | — | 1 | Infill station |
| 22 | Fangcun — Chentougang | 29 December 2025 | 11.5 km (7.15 mi) | 4 | Phase 1 |
| 12 | Chigang opens | 13 February 2026 | — | 1 | Infill station (eastern section) |
| 3 | Airport South (Terminal 1) closed | 7 May 2026 | — | -1 | Closed due to renovation of Baiyun Airport Terminal 1. |

== Lines in operation ==
| Line | Terminals (District) | | Commencement | Newest Extension | Length km | Stations | Depots/ Stabling Sidings |
|---|---|---|---|---|---|---|---|
| 1 | Xilang (Liwan) | Guangzhou East Railway Station (Tianhe) | June 28, 1997 | February 16, 1999 | 18.4 | 16 | Xilang |
| 2 | Guangzhou South Railway Station (Panyu) | Jiahewanggang (Baiyun) | December 29, 2002 | September 25, 2010 | 31.8 | 24 | Jiahe/Dazhou |
| 3 | Haibang (Panyu) | Airport North (Terminal 2) (Huadu); Tianhe Coach Terminal (Tianhe) | December 26, 2005 | November 1, 2024 | 74.89 | 34 | Jiahe/Xiajiao/Guangzhou New Town |
| 4 | Nansha Passenger Port (Nansha) | Huangcun (Tianhe) | December 26, 2005 | December 28, 2017 | 56.2 | 23 | Xinzao/Nansha |
| 5 | Jiaokou (Liwan) | Huangpu New Port (Huangpu) | December 28, 2009 | December 28, 2023 | 41.7 | 30 | Yuzhu/Shuanggang |
| 6 | Xunfenggang (Baiyun) | Xiangxue (Huangpu) | December 28, 2013 | December 28, 2016 | 42.0 | 32 | Xunfenggang/Luogang |
| 7 | Meidi Dadao (Shunde, Foshan) | Yanshan (Huangpu) | December 28, 2016 | December 28, 2023 | 54.24 | 27 | Dazhou/Yifeng/Jitang |
| 8 | Jiaoxin (Baiyun) | Wanshengwei (Haizhu) | September 25, 2010 | November 26, 2020 | 33.9 | 28 | Baiyunhu |
| 9 | Fei'eling (Huadu) | Gaozeng (Baiyun) | December 28, 2017 | — | 20.1 | 11 | Qishan |
| 10 | Xilang (Liwan) | Yangji East (Tianhe) | June 29, 2025 | — | 17.2 | 12 | Guanggang New Town |
| 11 | Loop line (–) | | December 28, 2024 | — | 44.2 | 31 | Chisha |
| 12; West | Xunfenggang (Baiyun) | Guangzhou Gymnasium (Baiyun) | June 29, 2025 | — | 15.0 | 9 | Chatou |
| 12; East | Ersha Island (Yuexiu) | Higher Education Mega Center South (Panyu) | June 29, 2025 | — | 12.9 | 9 | Higher Education Mega Center South |
| 13 | Tianhe Park (Tianhe) | Xinsha (Zengcheng) | December 28, 2017 | September 29, 2025 | 36.9 | 15 | Yuzhu/Guanhu |
| 14 | Lejia Road (Baiyun); Xinhe (Baiyun) | Dongfeng (Conghua); Zhenlong (Huangpu) | December 28, 2017 | September 29, 2025 | 85.1 | 29 | Shihu/Zhenlong/Dengcun |
| 18 | Xiancun (Tianhe) | Wanqingsha (Nansha) | September 28, 2021 | — | 58.3 | 8 | Longzhen/Wanqingsha |
| 21 | Tianhe Park (Tianhe) | Zengcheng Square (Zengcheng) | December 28, 2018 | December 20, 2019 | 60.5 | 20 | Zhenlong/Xiangling/Shuixi |
| 22 | Fangcun (Liwan) | Panyu Square (Panyu) | March 31, 2022 | December 29, 2025 | 30.6 | 8 | Longzhen/Chentougang |
| APM | Canton Tower (Haizhu) | Linhexi (Tianhe) | November 8, 2010 | — | 4.0 | 9 | Chigang Pagoda |
| Guangfo | Xincheng Dong (Shunde, Foshan) | Lijiao (Haizhu) | November 3, 2010 | December 28, 2018 | 39.6 | 25 | Xianan |
| Total | | | | | 779.9 | 399 | |

=== Line 1 ===
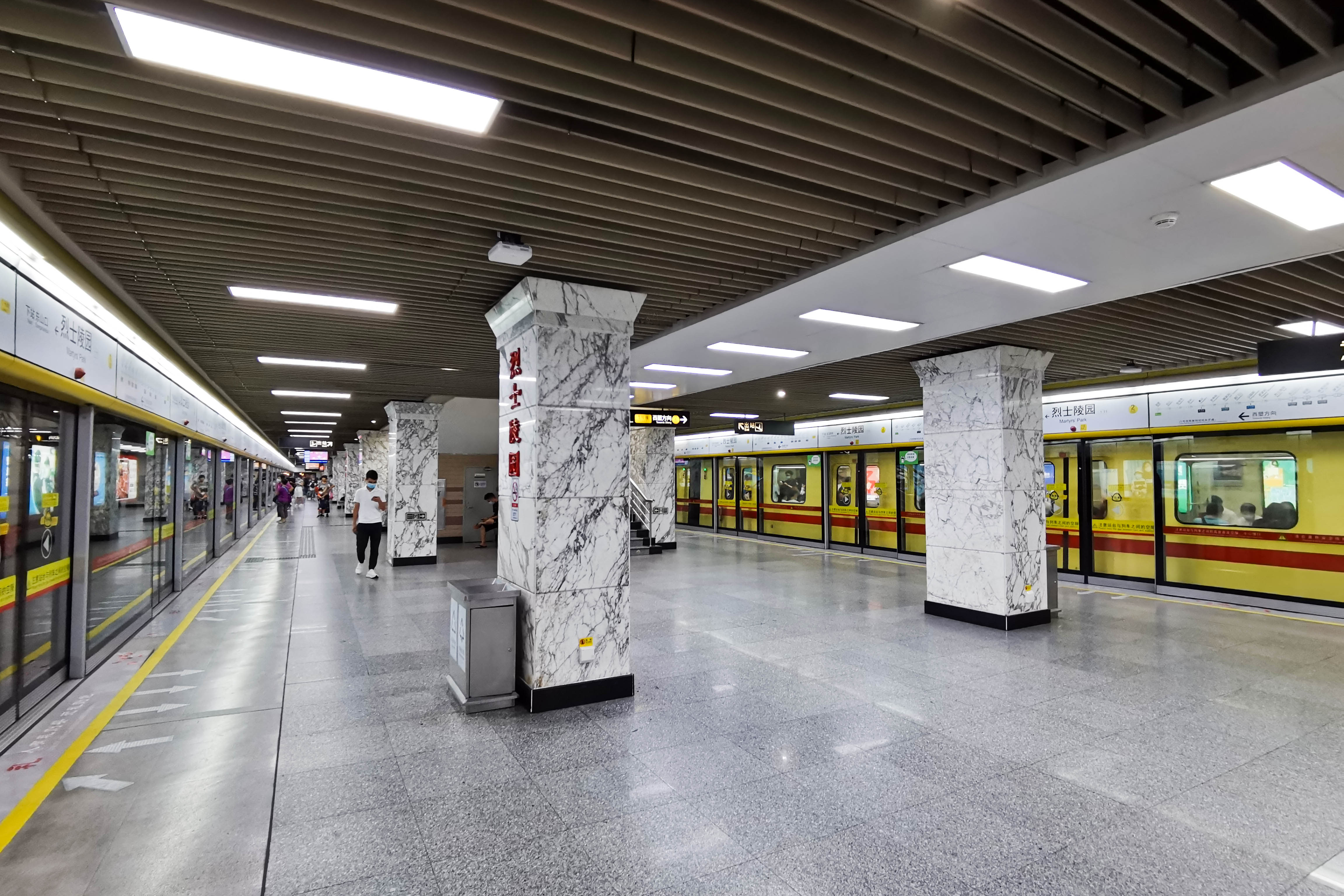
Martyrs' Park station of Line 1

Line 1 runs from Xilang to Guangzhou East railway station, with a total length of 18.5 km (11.5 mi). Except for Kengkou and Xilang, all stations on Line 1 are underground. Its first section, from Xilang to Huangsha, opened on 28 June 1997, making Guangzhou the fourth city in mainland China to have a metro system. The full line started operation two years later on 28 June 1999.

=== Line 2 ===
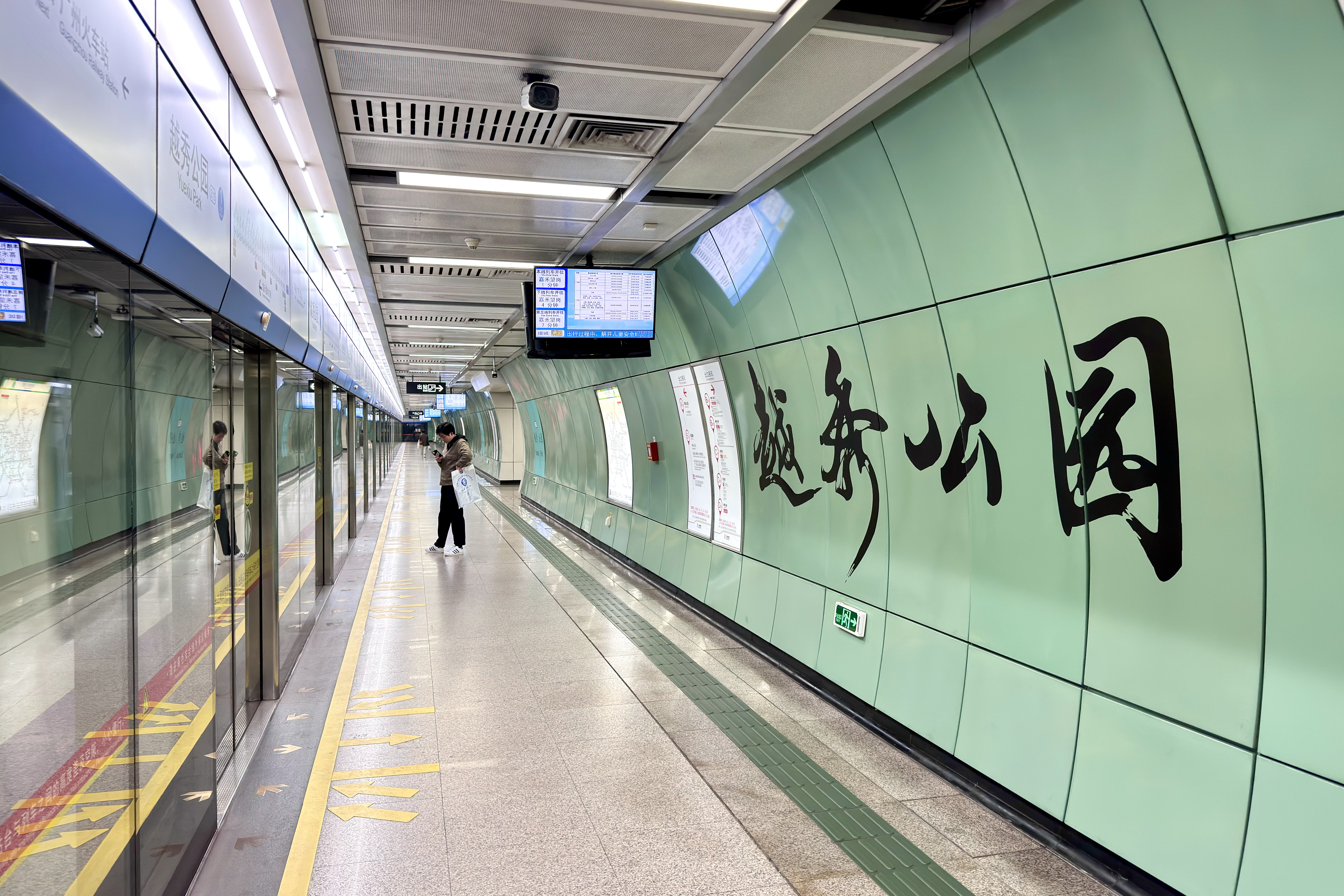
Yuexiu Park station of Line 2

Line 2 is a north–south line that runs from Jiahewanggang to Guangzhou South railway station. Until 21 September 2010, it ran from Sanyuanli to Wanshengwei. Its first section, between Sanyuanli and Xiaogang, opened on 29 December 2002. It was extended from Xiaogang to Pazhou on 28 June 2003 and further to Wanshengwei a year later. The section between Xiaogang and Wanshengwei was split off to form part of Line 8 during 22–24 September 2010, when the operation was paused. The latest extension, from Jiangnanxi to Guangzhou South railway station and from Sanyuanli to Jiahewanggang, opened on 25 September 2010 as the whole line resumed operation. The length of the current line is 31.4 km (19.5 mi). All stations in Line 2 are underground.

=== Line 3 ===
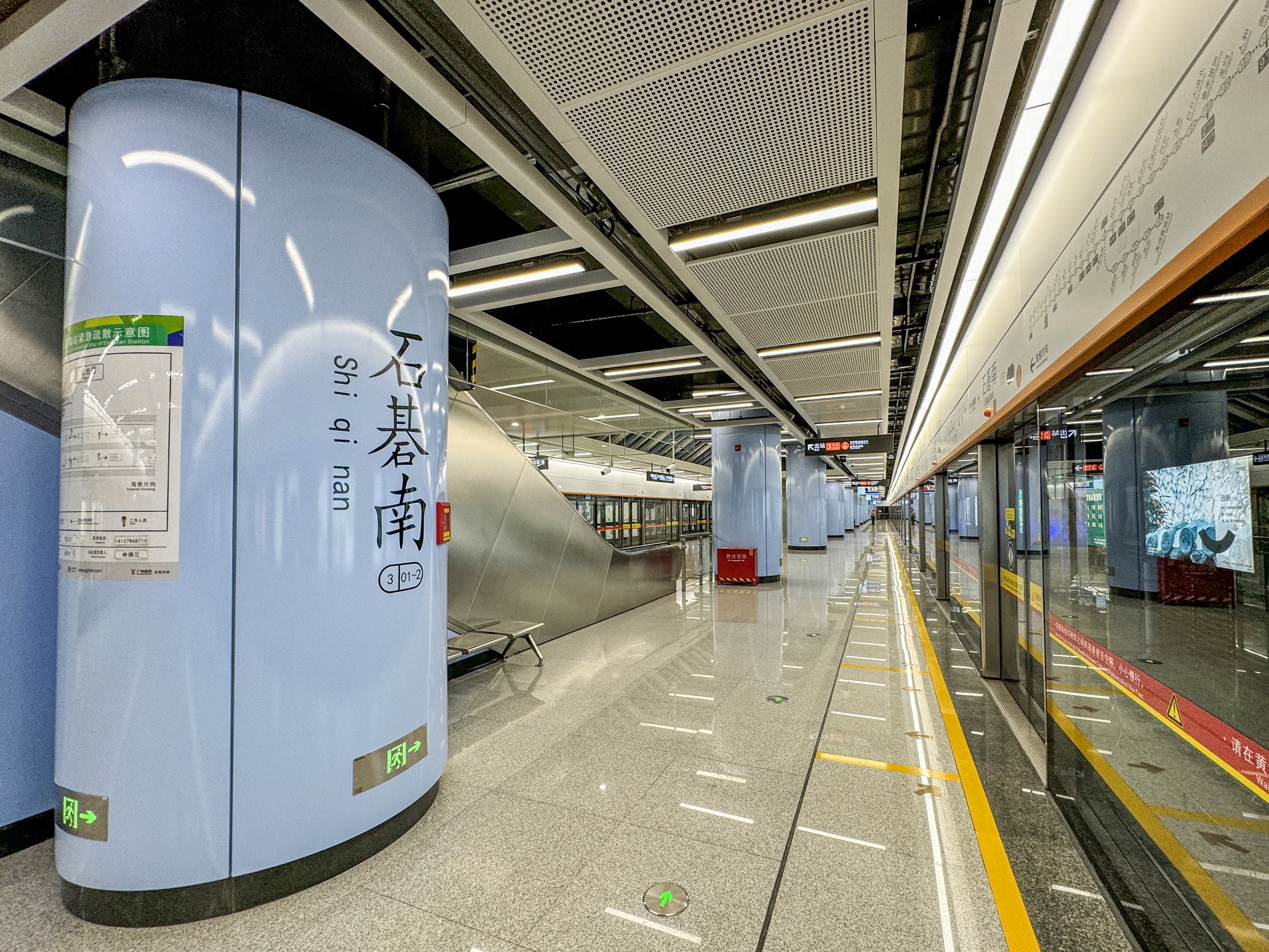
Shiqinan station of Line 3

Line 3 is a 74.9 km (46.5 mi) Y-shaped line connecting Airport North and Tianhe Coach Terminal to Haibang. All stations in the line are underground. When the line opened on 26 December 2005, trains operated between Guangzhou East railway station and Kecun. Following completion of the Tianhe Coach Terminal–Tiyu Xilu and Kecun–Panyu Square sections, the line was rerouted on 30 December 2006 to offer transfer-free connections between Panyu Square and Tianhe Coach Terminal via Tiyu Xilu. The Guangzhou East railway station–Tiyu Xilu section became a shuttle until it was extended northwards to Airport South on 30 October 2010. Southwards, it was extended from Panyu Square to Haibang on 1 November 2024. In official distinctions, the main route consists of the entire Airport North–Haibang section, while the Tianhe Coach Terminal–Tiyu Xilu section is a spur line. The spur line will be split off in the short term to form part of Line 10. Line 3 had been notorious for its crowding since it opened, for it ran three-car trains. That was partly relieved when all three-car trains started operating as six-car ones, connected in sets of two, on 28 April 2010. Sectional services between Tonghe to Dashi are added from 7:30 to 8:30 every workday, partly solving the capacity issues. Despite these changes, as of 2025, the line is still severely overcrowded.

=== Line 4 ===
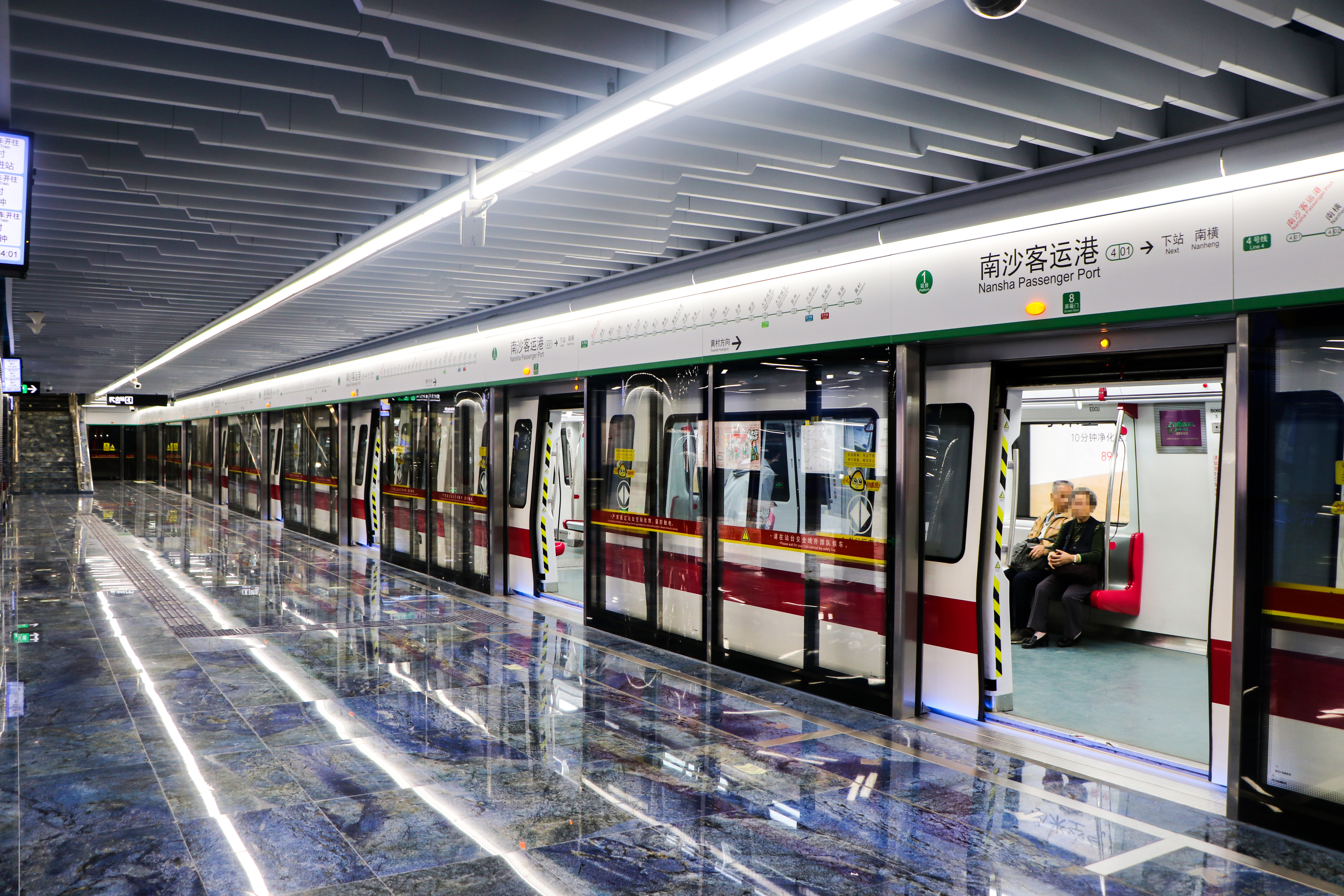
Nansha Passenger Port station of Line 4

Line 4 is a north–south line running parallel to Line 2 along the east of the city. It is 60.03 km (37.30 mi) long with 24 stations. The section of the line from Huangcun to Xinzao, Feishajiao to Nansha Passenger Port are built underground, while that from Xinzao to Jinzhou is built at the elevated track. It was the first metro line in mainland China to use linear motor trains. Its first section, from Wanshengwei to Xinzao, opened on 26 December 2005. Southwards, it was extended from Xinzao to Huangge on 30 December 2006 and further to Jinzhou on 28 June 2007. Northwards, it was extended from Wanshengwei to Chebeinan on 28 December 2009 and further to Huangcun on 25 September 2010. Its latest extension, from Jinzhou to Nansha Passenger Port, opened on 27 December 2017.

=== Line 5 ===
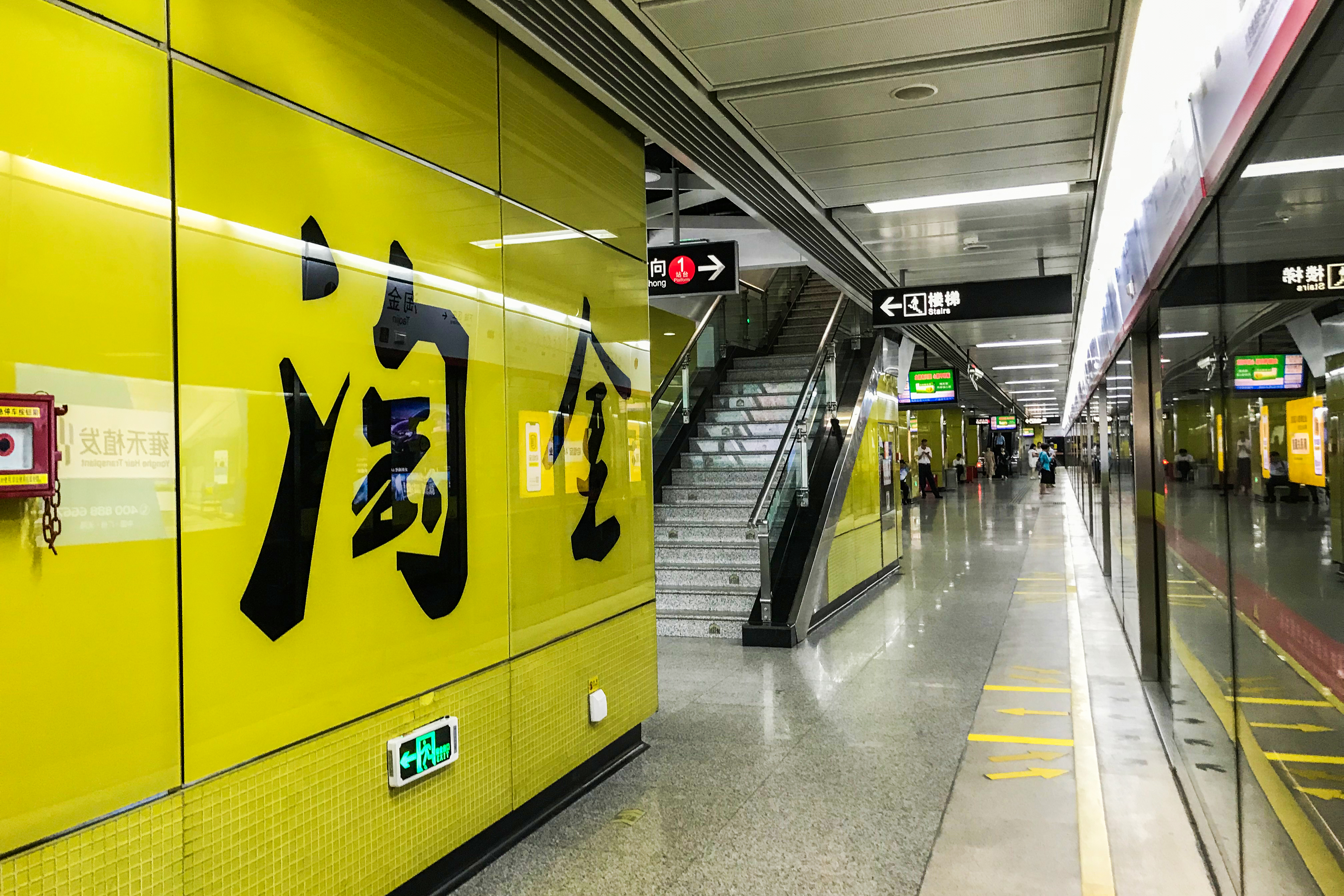
Taojin station of Line 5

The 41.7 km (25.9 mi) long Line 5 currently runs from Jiaokou to Huangpu New Port. It first entered operation on 28 December 2009 between Jiaokou and Wenchong, and was extended on 28 December 2023 from Wenchong to Huangpu New Port. All stations in the line except Jiaokou and Tanwei are underground. Until Line 8 was split off from Line 2, it was the only line that interchanged with all other lines. Similar to Line 4, Line 5 also uses linear motor trains.

=== Line 6 ===
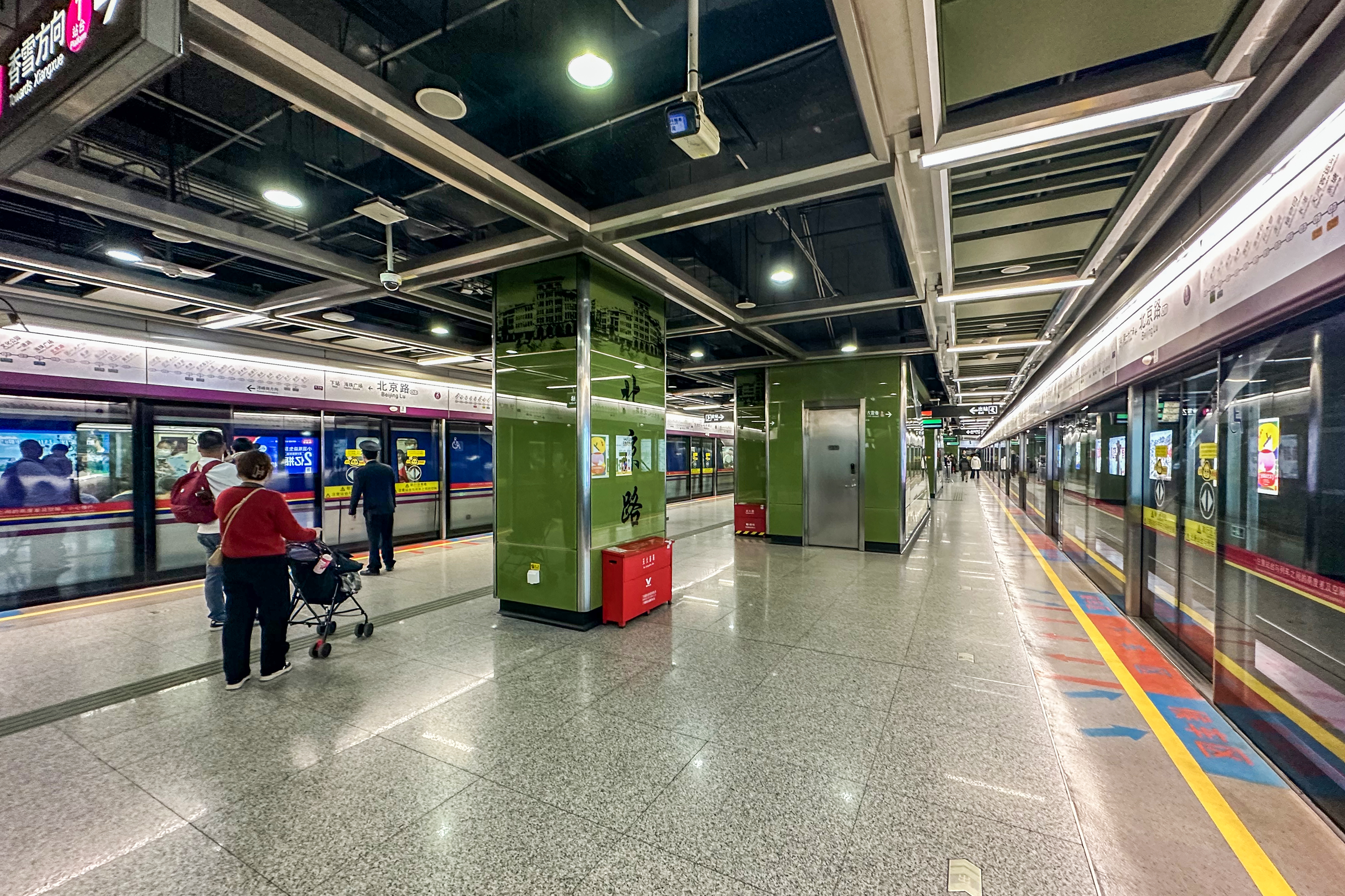
Beijing Lu station of Line 6

The first stage of Line 6, a 24.5 km (15.2 mi) long phase one runs from Xunfenggang to Changban with 22 stations. It began service on 28 December 2013 and contains three elevated stations along the route. A 10-station, 17.5 km (10.9 mi) long extension to Xiangxue from Changban entered revenue service in 2016. The line runs four-car trains, but stations on the east extension starting with South China Botanical Garden are constructed with a provision to accommodate six-car trains in preparation for a route split in the future. All stations in the line except Xunfenggang, Hengsha and Shabei are underground.

=== Line 7 ===
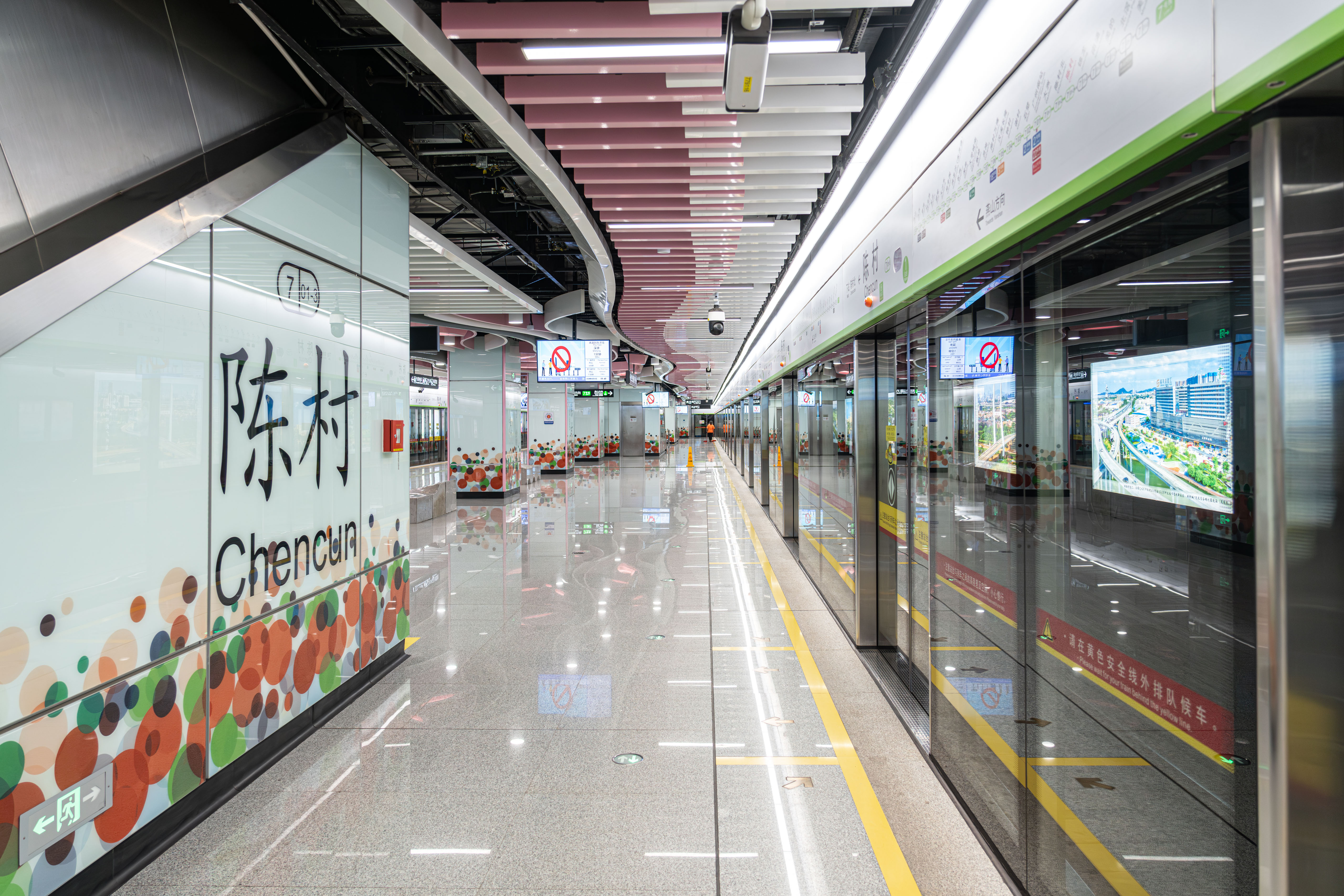
Chencun station of Line 7

The first phase of Line 7 began service on 28 December 2016 and ran from Guangzhou South railway station to Higher Education Mega Center South in Panyu District throughout 18.6 km (11.6 mi). The phase 1 west extension opened on 1 May 2022 from Guangzhou South railway station to Meidi Dadao station. Six-car trains are used. All stations are underground. Phase 2 opened on 28 December 2023, and extends the line by 22.2 km (13.8 mi) from Higher Education Mega Center South station to Yanshan station, with 11 stations, to reach north of the Pearl River and go deep to Huangpu District, providing interchanges with Line 13 at Yufengwei, Line 5 at Dashadong, Line 6 at Luogang, Line 21 at Shuixi and the planned east extension of Line 8 at Changzhou.

=== Line 8 ===
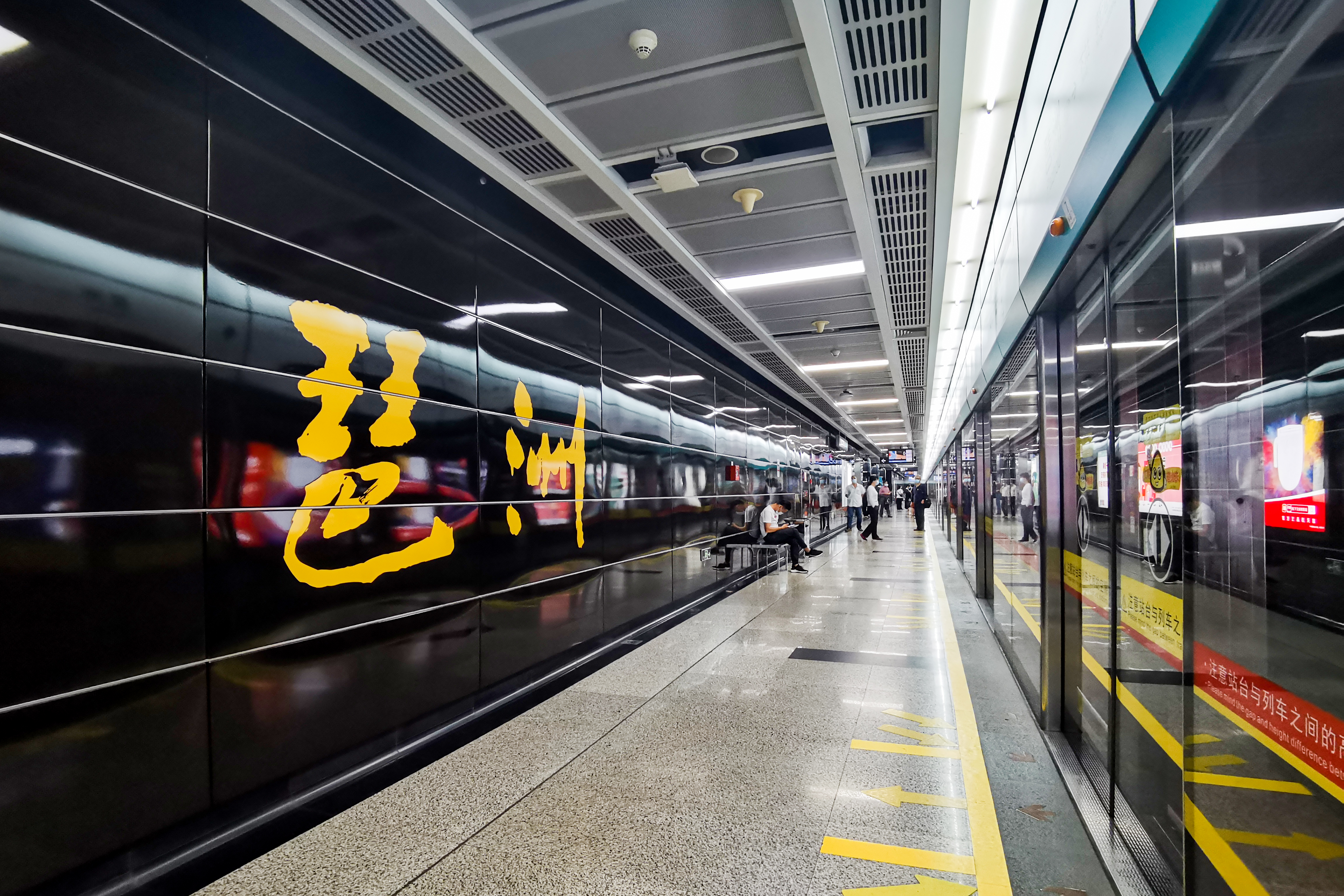
Pazhou station of Line 8

The first section of Line 8, from Xiaogang to Wanshengwei, opened in 2002 and ran as part of Line 2 until the extension to the line was completed in September 2010. Line 8 ran from Fenghuang Xincun to Wanshengwei. The section from Changgang to Wanshengwei opened on 25 September 2010 when the split-off from Line 2 was complete. The section west of Changgang did not open until 3 November 2010 due to disputes over the environmental impact of the cooling facilities at Shayuan. The remaining section from Fenghuang Xincun to Cultural Park and Cultural Park to Jiaoxin are opened on 28 December 2019 and 26 November 2020 separately.

=== Line 9 ===
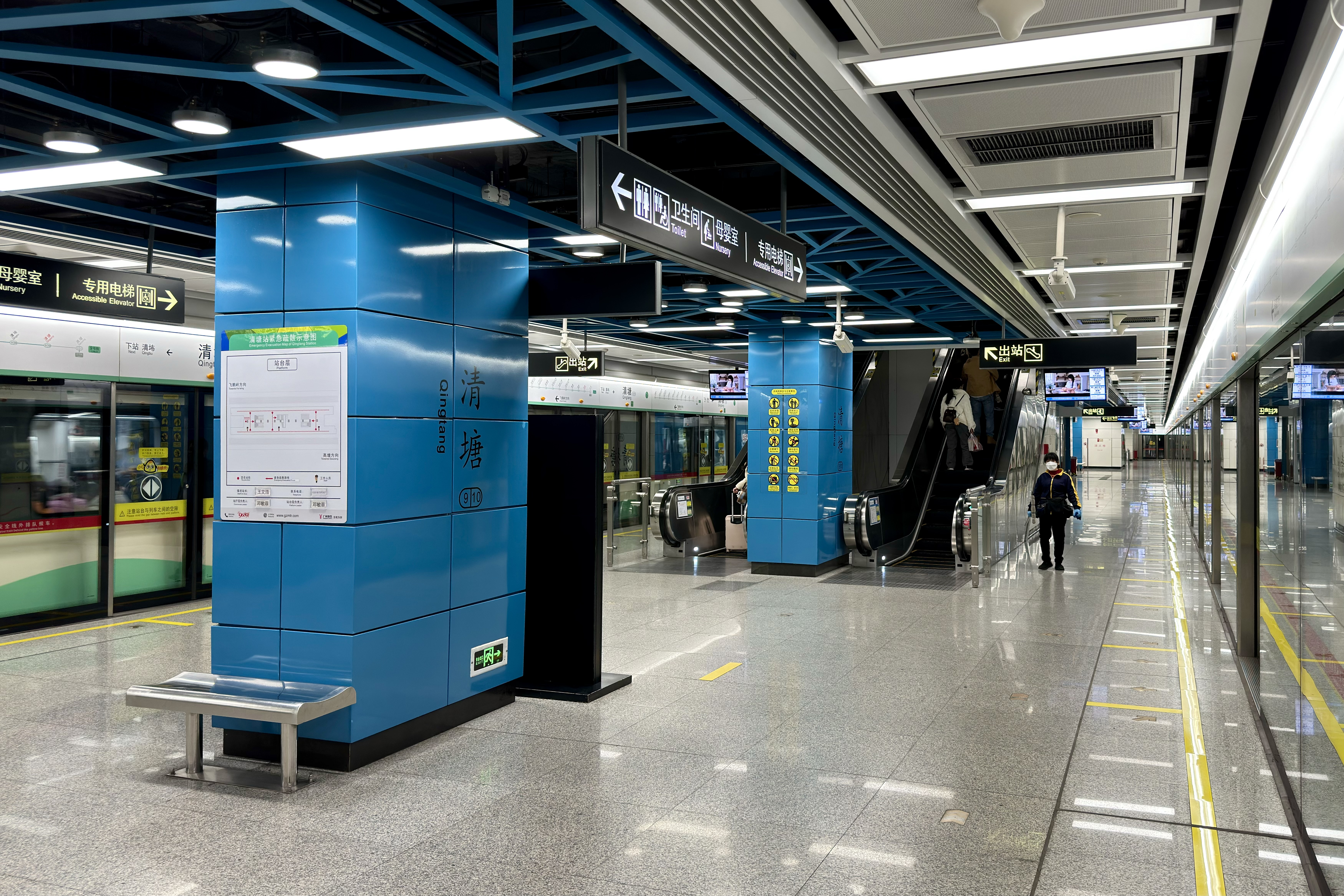
Qingtang station of Line 9

The 20.1 km (12.5 mi) long underground route is operated by six-car trains, which runs from Fei'eling to Gaozeng, serving 11 stations. The line, other than Qingtang station, went operational on 28 December 2017. Line 9 mainly serves as a link for the passengers of Huadu District and Guangzhou North railway station to the rest of the system, having only one transfer station with Line 3 at Gaozeng. After the Tianhe Coach Terminal–Tiyu Xilu spur line of Line 3 is split off to form part of Line 10, the line is expected to be connected into Line 3 using the reserved switches at Gaozeng to become a new spur line.

=== Line 10 ===
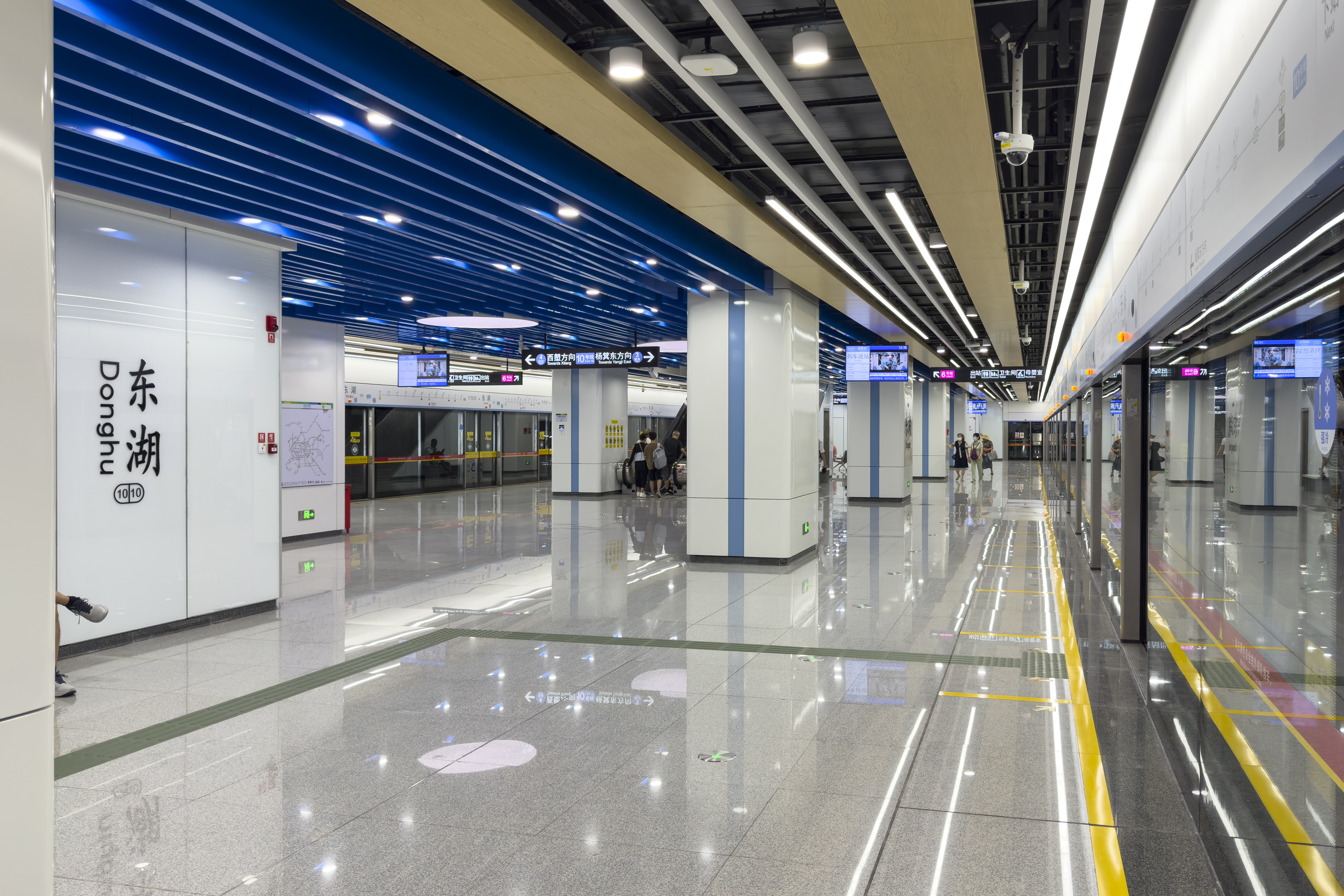
Donghu station of Line 10

The 17.2 km (10.7 mi) long initial section of Line 10 from Xilang to Yangji East opened on 29 June 2025. Line 10 connects Tianhe with Liwan via Haizhu. Due to logistical uncertainties in constructing the connection between Yangji East and Shipaiqiao (which requires track dismantling and reconfiguration), the section between Shipaiqiao and Tianhe Coach Terminal which currently runs as a branch of Line 3 will not be incorporated into the line yet. All stations on the line are underground.

=== Line 11 ===
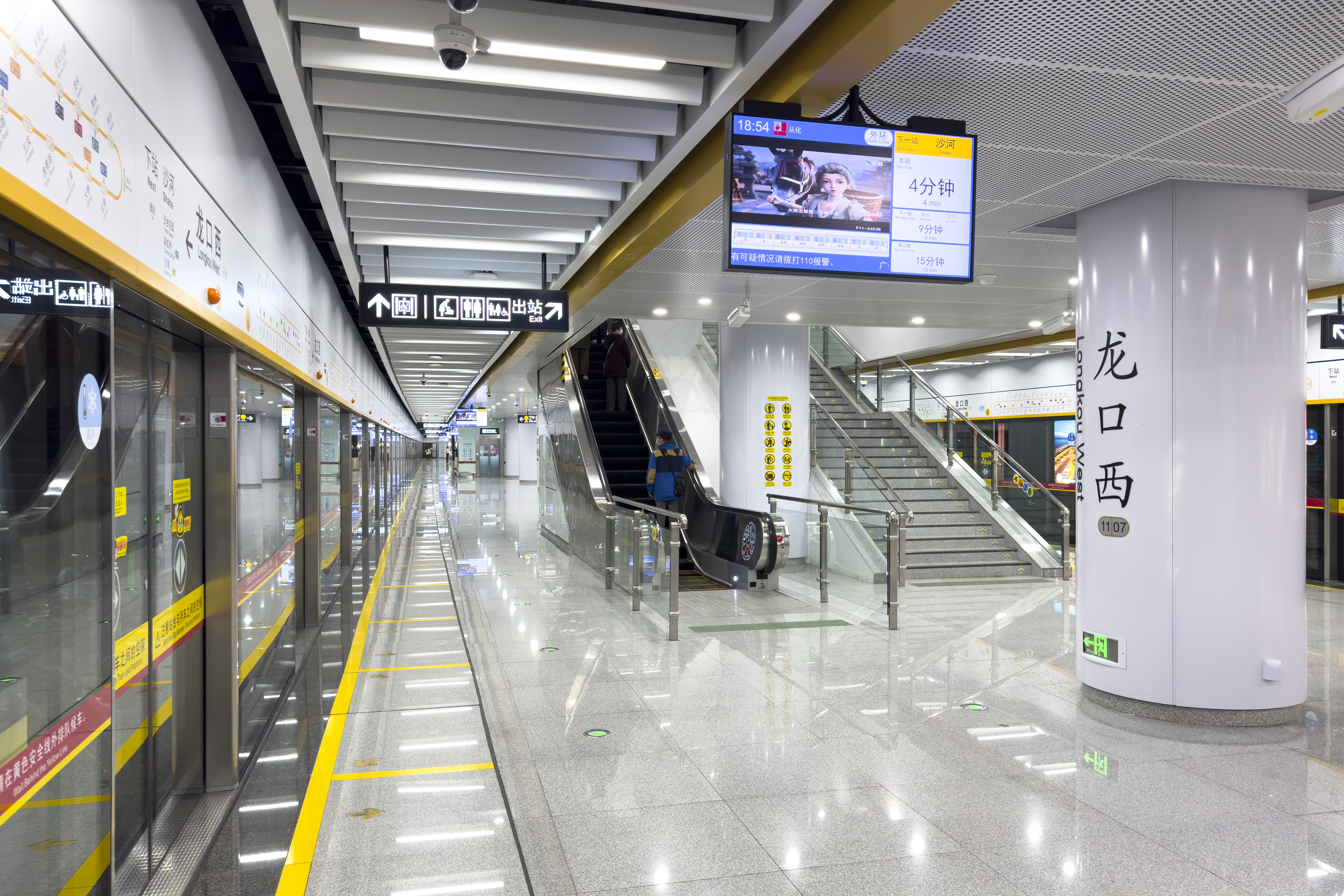
Longkou West station of Line 11

Line 11 is a 44.2 km (27.5 mi) underground loop-shaped line—the first in such shape—connecting Chisha and Longtan, via Guangzhou railway station, Guangzhou East railway station, Pazhou, Caihong Bridge, Tianhe Park and Fangcun. The line was opened on 28 December 2024 at 14:00 local time, with trains stopping at all stations except Guangzhou Railway Station.

=== Line 12 ===
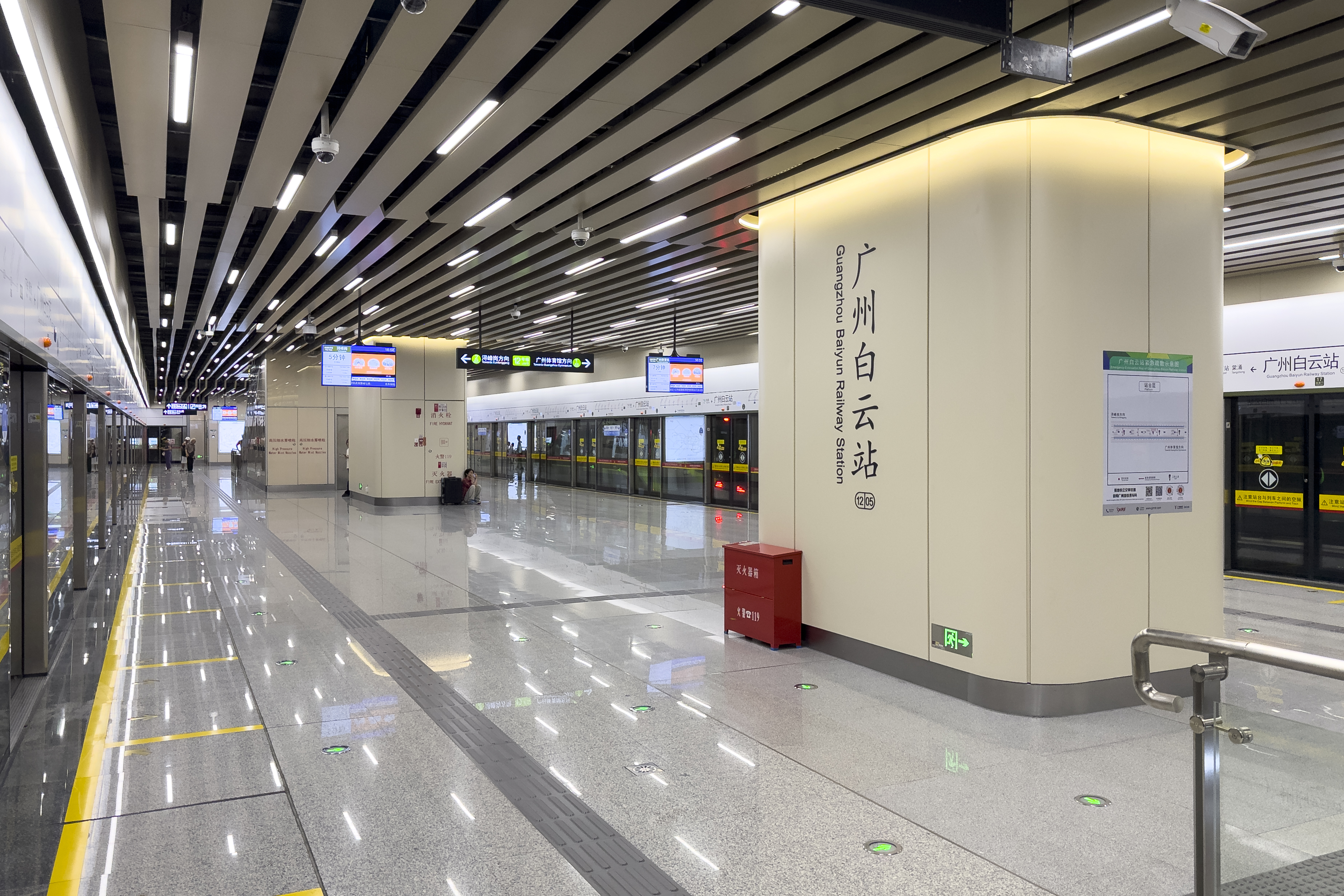
Guangzhou Baiyun Railway Station of Line 12

Line 12 currently operates in 2 separate sections, with their total length being 27.9 km (17.3 mi). The 9-station western section between Xunfenggang and Guangzhou Gymnasium and the 9-station eastern section between Ersha Island and Higher Education Mega Center South except Chigang opened on 29 June 2025. Chigang station opened on 13 February 2026. The middle section between Guangzhou Gymnasium and Ersha Island, consisting of 7 stations, is still under construction. All stations on the line are underground.

=== Line 13 ===
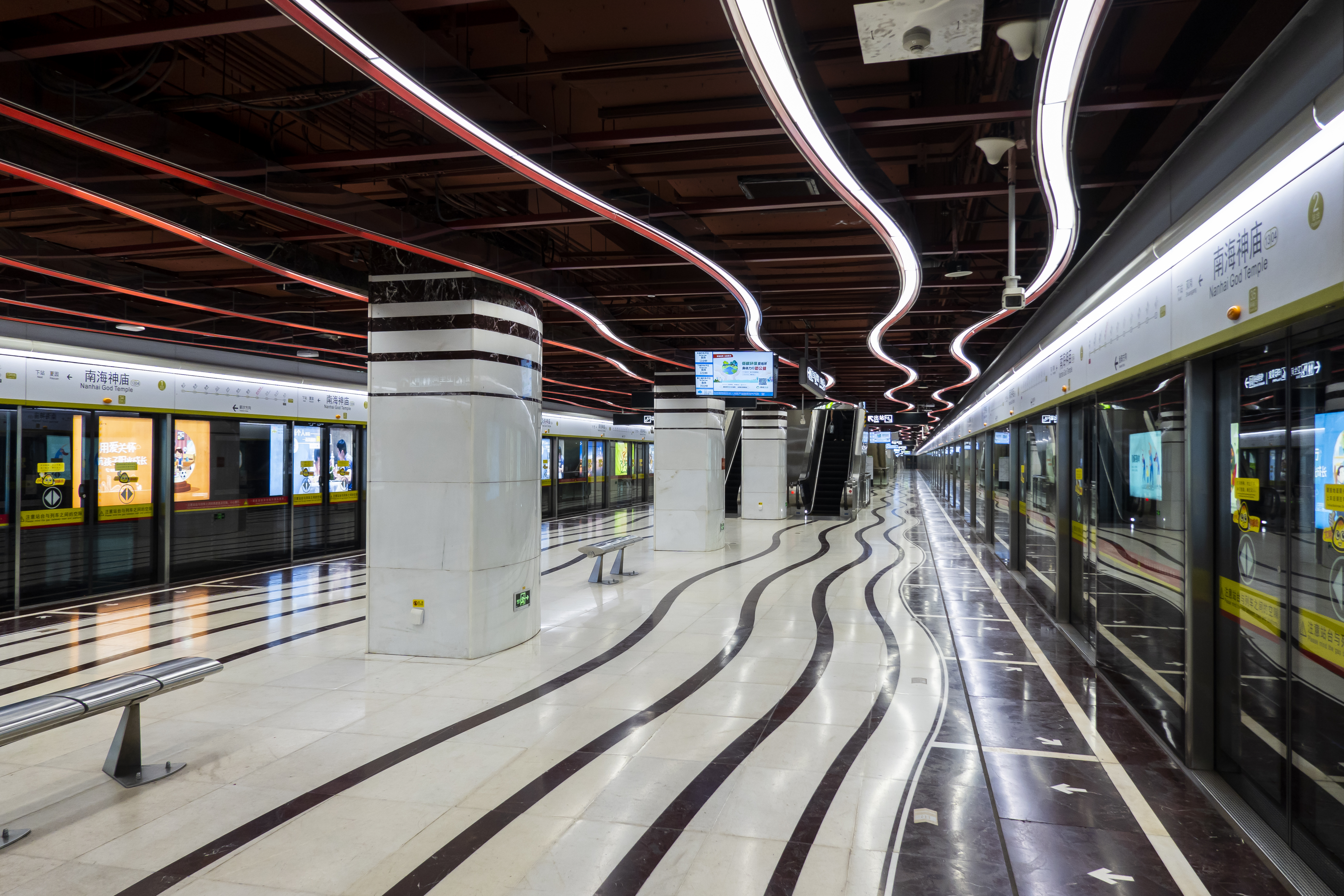
Nanhai God Temple station of Line 13

Opened on 28 December 2017, Line 13 is the first metro line in Guangzhou built to run eight-car trains. The currently operating 27.03 km (16.80 mi) first phase runs from Yuzhu to Xinsha, serving passengers of Huangpu and Xintang, Zengcheng. The eleven-station line currently has transfers with Line 5 at Yuzhu and Xiayuan, Line 7 at Yufengwei, and the national railway at Xintang. The second phase of Line 13 runs west of the current phase, which cuts through popular areas of Huangpu, Tianhe, and Liwan District. Among them, the first section of the second phase (Yuzhu - Tianhe Park) entering Tianhe District opened on 29 September 2025, bringing the residents of Tianhe Zhucun and Tangxia and other areas along Zhongshan Avenue into the metro network. Tianhe Park station allows transfer to Line 11, and because it runs parallel to Line 5, it can help ease the passenger flow pressure on the latter.

=== Line 14 ===
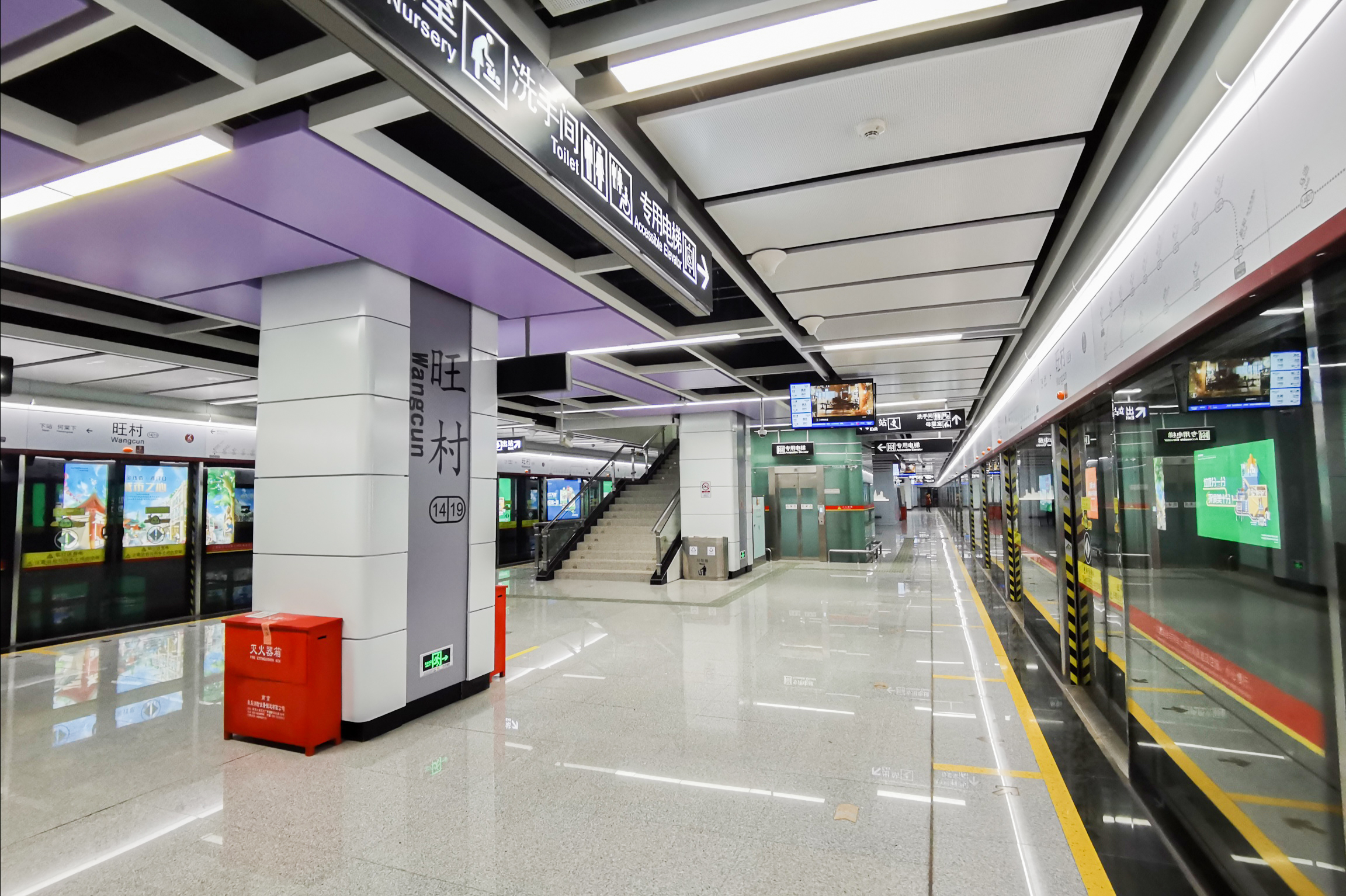
Wangcun station of Line 14

Two sections of Line 14 are currently in service. The Knowledge City Branch Line, a ten-station 21.01 km (13.06 mi) long route located mainly within Huangpu, opened on 28 December 2017. The branch line operates primarily within Huangpu between Xinhe and Zhenlong, serving the Sino-Singapore Guangzhou Knowledge City. The mainline segment to Conghua opened a year later on 28 December 2018 and runs from Jiahewanggang in Baiyun District to Dongfeng in Conghua. A southward extension via Jichang (Airport) Road to Lejia Road in Baiyun District opened on 29 September 2025. A further extension south to Guangzhou railway station is under construction. Line 14 was the first Guangzhou Metro line to run express services.

=== Line 18 ===
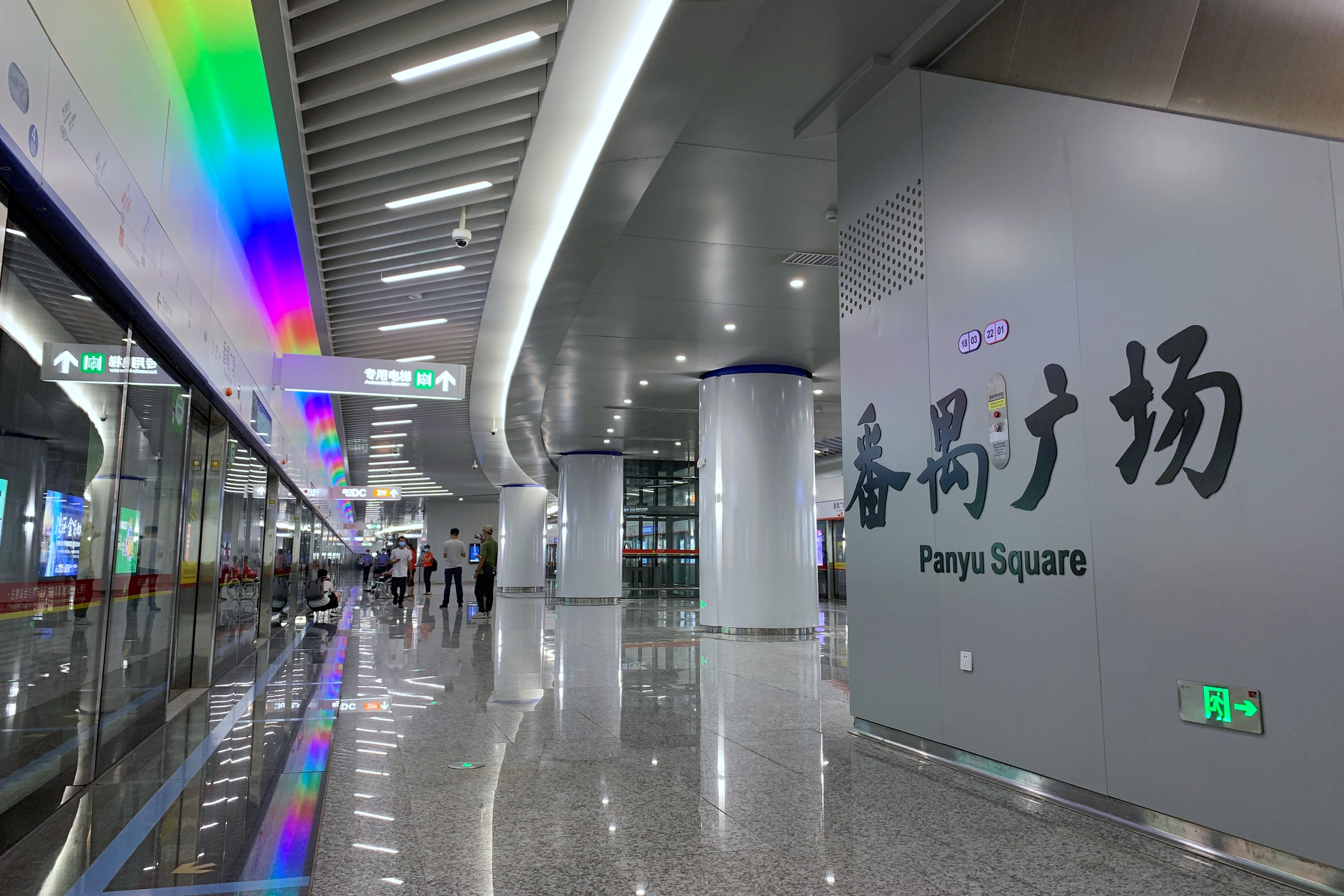
Panyu Square station of Line 18

The section from Xiancun to Wanqingsha of Line 18 opened on 28 September 2021. The section is 58.3 km in length. It will be extended 3 km to Guangzhou East Railway Station. A further 39.6 km extension to Huachengjie and a southwestern extension to Zhongshan is also under construction.

=== Line 21 ===
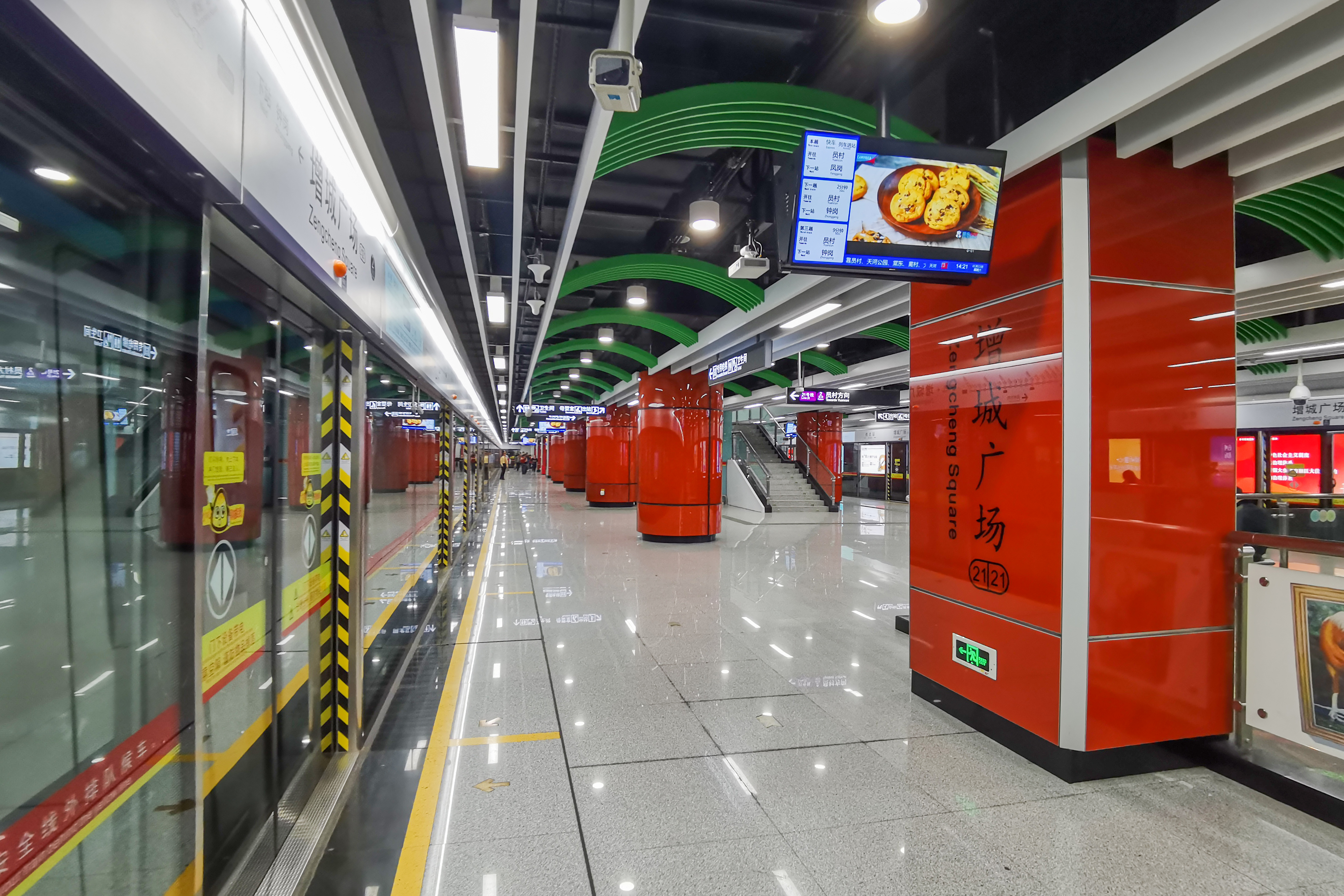
Zengcheng Square station of Line 21

The 60.5 km (37.6 mi) long Line 21 runs between Tianhe Park in Tianhe and Zengcheng Square in Zengcheng with six-car trains. It has 40.1 km (24.9 mi) of underground tracks, 14.7 km (9.1 mi) of elevated tracks, and 6.8 km (4.2 mi) of tracks in mountain tunnels. The section from Yuancun to Tianhe Park is intended as part of Line 11 and constructed to accommodate the eight-car trains of the latter. When the construction of Line 11 was completed, this section was returned to Line 11, making Tianhe Park the new west end of Line 21. Express service was also provided after the inauguration of the western section (Yuancun – Zhenlongxi).

=== Line 22 ===
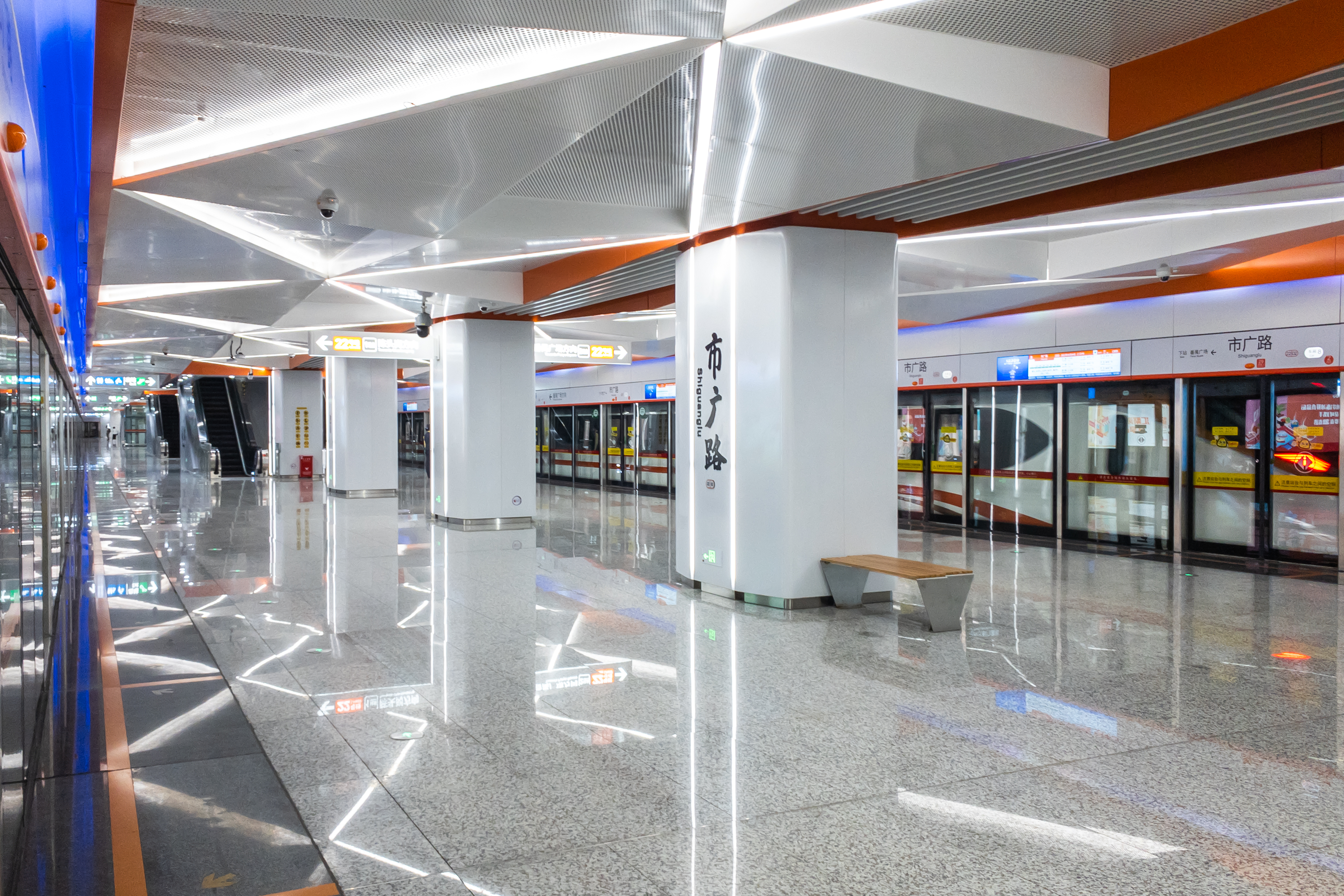
Shiguanglu station of Line 22

The section from Panyu Square to Chentougang of Line 22 opened on 31 March 2022. The section is 18.2 km in length. The section from Chentougang to Fangcun opened on 29 December 2025. The section is 11.5 km in length. It will be extended 42.4 km to Airport North (Terminal 2).

=== Guangfo Line ===
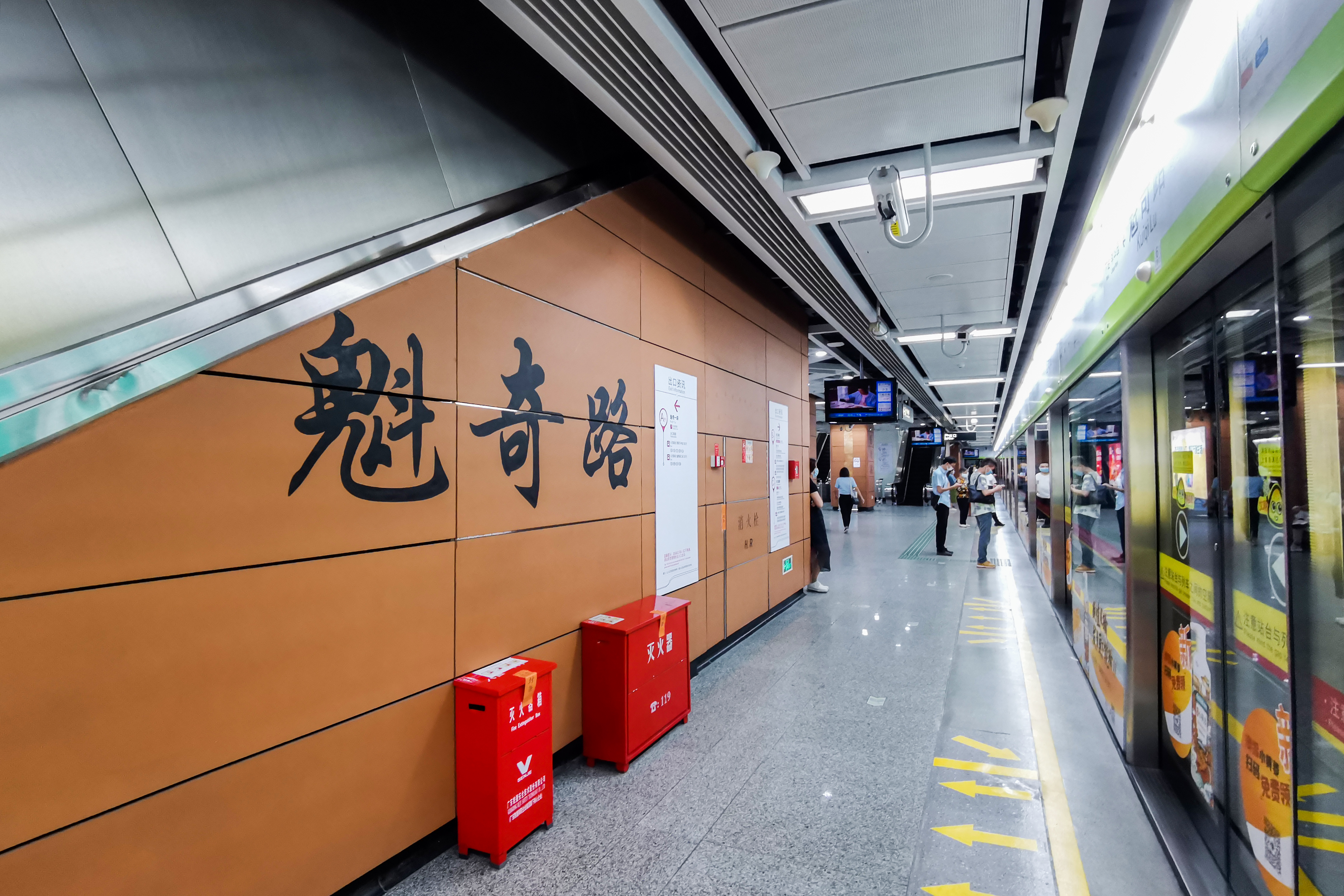
Kuiqi Lu station of Guangfo Line

The Guangzhou–Foshan Section of Pearl River Delta Region Intercity Rapid Transit (Chinese: 珠江三角洲地区城际快速轨道交通广州至佛山段) is an intercity metro line that connects Guangzhou and Foshan. It is commonly known as Guangfo Metro and Guangfo Line of Guangzhou Metro. The section within Foshan also doubles as Line 1 of FMetro (Foshan Metro). The line is operated by Guangdong Guangfo Rail Transit Co., Ltd., a subsidiary co-owned by Guangzhou Metro (51%) and Foshan Metro (49%). Its first section, from Xilang to Kuiqi Lu in Foshan, started operation on 3 November 2010 with 21 km (13 mi) of tracks and 14 stations. Eleven of the stations are located in Foshan, while the other three are in Guangzhou. Relocation disputes at Lijiao were not resolved until October 2013 and have delayed completion of the extension from Xilang to Lijiao till December 2015. When the line is completed, it will have 32.2 km (20.0 mi) of tracks and 21 stations, of which 17.4 km (10.8 mi) of tracks and 10 stations will be located in Guangzhou. The line runs four-car trains. All its stations are underground.

=== Zhujiang New Town APM Line ===
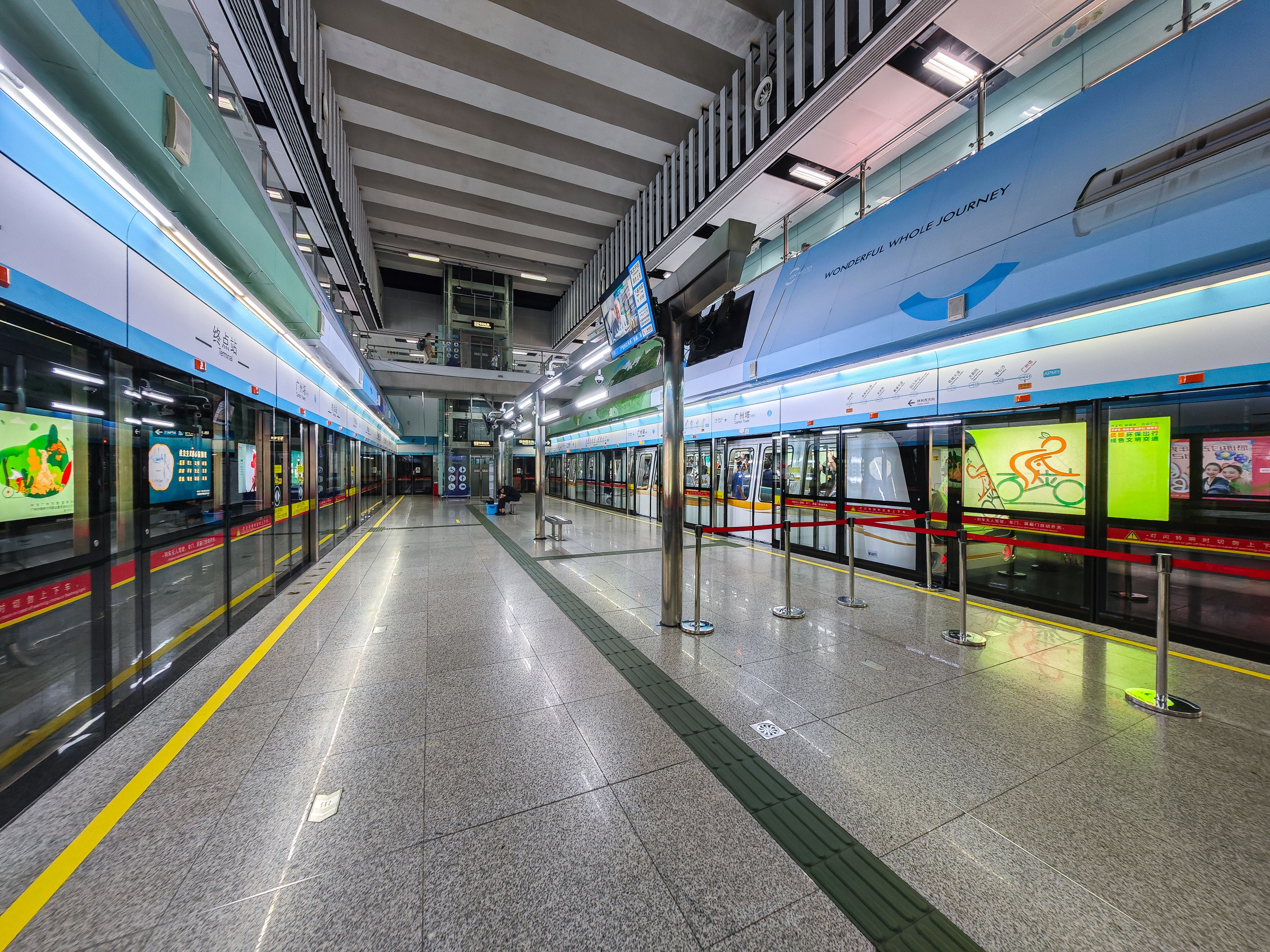
Canton Tower station of APM Line

The Automated People Mover System of Zhujiang New Town Core District Municipal Traffic Project (Chinese: 珠江新城核心区市政交通项目旅客自动输送系统) is an underground automated people mover that serves the central business district of Zhujiang New Town. It is commonly known as Zhujiang New Town Automated People Mover System or the APM for short. At a length of 3.9 km (2.4 mi), it connects Linhexi and Canton Tower with nine stations on the line. The operation started on 8 November 2010 with Canton Tower Station named Chigang Pagoda Station until December 2013. The stations of Haixinsha and Chigang Pagoda remained closed during the 2010 Asian Games. Chigang Pagoda Station opened on 28 November 2010, one day after the Asian Games ended; Haixinsha Station remained unopened until 24 February 2011. There is no direct platform-to-platform connection between the APM and Line 3 albeit they share the stations of Linhexi and Canton Tower. Transfer passengers need to exit and reenter with a new ticket. The APM runs two-car rubber-wheeled driverless trains.

== Network expansion ==
=== Short-term planning ===
Under construction
| Project | Terminals/Stations | Length km | Stations | Construction progress (Note: As of August 2026.) | Expected opening time |
|---|---|---|---|---|---|
| 4 Remaining station | Guanqiao | — | 1 | Under construction | 2026 |
| 7 Remaining station | Hongshengsha | — | 1 | Opening postponed | — |
| 8 Far northern extension | Jiaoxin – Jiangfu | 9.4 | 4 | 30% | — |
| 8 Eastern extension | Wanshengwei – Lianhua | 18.0 | 8 | 7% | — |
| 10 Line 3 branch dismantling section (Note: The Shipaiqiao – Tianhe Coach Terminal section currently operates as part of Line 3.) | Yangji East – Shipaiqiao joins Line 3 spur line | 2.1 | 1 | 71% | — |
| 11 Remaining station | Guangzhou Railway Station | — | 1 | Under construction | — |
| 12 Middle section | Guangzhou Gymnasium – Ersha Island | 9.7 | 7 | Comprehensive joint commissioning | 2026 |
| 13 Phase 2 remaining section | Tianhe Park – Yagang | 25.2 | 19 | Comprehensive joint commissioning | 2026 |
| 14 Phase 2 remaining section | Guangzhou railway station – Lejia Road | 3.0 | 1 | — | — |
| 18 Remaining section of Phase 1 | Xiancun – Guangzhou East Railway Station | 3 | 1 | 57% | — |
| 18 Northern extension (Guanghua intercity) | Guangzhou East Railway Station – Huachengjie | 40.1 | 7 | 63% | — |
| 18 Southern extension western section (Nanzhuzhong intercity Nansha to Zhongshan section) | Wanqingsha – Xingzhong | 47.6 | 10 | 91% (Guangzhou section); 44% (Zhongshan section) | — |
| 22 Northern extension (Fangbai intercity) | Fangcun – Airport North | 42.4 | 10 | 53% | — |
| 24 North section (Line 8 far northern extension) | Jiangfu – Guangzhou North Railway Station | 11.3 | 18 | 30% | — |
| 24 South section (Line 8 far northern extension branch) | Sun Yat-sen Memorial Hall – Jiangfu | 20.0 | 18 | 31% | — |
| 28 (Fosuiguan intercity Foshan-Guangzhou section) | Luzhou – Xintang | 71.6 | 17 | Guangzhou section: Under construction Foshan section: Pre-construction preparations | — |
Approved and awaiting construction (Note: All construction plans are subject to approval by national authorities. A line is considered "approved" in this table if the National Development and Reform Commission (NDRC) has greenlighted establishment of its construction project. For actual construction to start, the project must obtain follow-up approvals including the NDRC's endorsement of its feasibility study. The construction plan may not stabilise until construction starts. For this reason, discrepancies exist among certain references due to evolution of construction plans and inaccuracies in news reports. In general, more recent reports take priority over older ones.)
| Project | Terminals/Stations | Length km | Stations | Status | |
| 18 Southern extension (Nanzhuzhong intercity Zhongshan to Zhuhai section) | Xiangshan – Gongbei | 18.1 (Zhongshan section); 26.6 (Zhuhai section) | 11 | Feasibility Plan Adjustments | |
| 28 (Fosuiguan intercity Dongguan section) | Xintang – Songshan Lake | 41.4 | 6 | Preliminary studies in progress | |
Awaiting approval
| Project | Terminals/Stations | Length km | Stations | Status | |
| 26 Foshan section | Magang Dadao – Shunde College Railway Station – (Guangfo city boundary) | 11.3 | 4 | EIA publicity | |

=== Long-term planning ===
The Guangzhou Urban Rail Transit Network Planning Scheme (2018–2035) (Chinese: 《广州市城市轨道交通线网规划方案》（2018—2035年）), which was approved by the Guangzhou Municipal Government in November 2020, shows that a total of 53 metro lines and 2,029 km are planned in Guangzhou. This round of line network planning is divided into three levels: high-speed metro, rapid metro, and regular-speed metro. Among them, there are 5 high-speed metro lines with 452 km in Guangzhou, 11 rapid metro lines with 607 km in Guangzhou, and 37 regular-speed metro lines with 970 km.

- High-speed metro lines:
  - 17 : Knowledge City – Luogang – Zini (→ Foshan)
  - 18 : (Zhongshan / Zhuhai →) Shiliuchong – Huachengjie (→ Qingyuan)
  - 22 : Airport North – Nansha Passenger Port (→ Dongguan)
  - 28 : (Foshan →) Fangcun – Xintang (→ Dongguan)
  - 28 spur line: Xintang – Guangzhou Huali College (→ Huizhou)
  - 37 : Guangzhou East Railway Station – Liangkou (→ Xinfeng)
- Rapid metro lines:
  - 3 : Airport North (Terminal 2) – Haiou Island
  - 4 parallel express line: Pazhou – Jiaomen
  - 13 : Chaoyang – Xinsha
  - 14 : Guangzhou Railway Station – Dongfeng
  - 16 : Xintang – Lichengbei
  - 21 : Tianhe Park – Guangzhou Huali College
  - 24 : Guangzhou North Railway Station – Lijiao
  - 25 : Longxi – Huangpu New Port
  - 26 : Taihe – Lanhe (→ Foshan)
  - 27 : Xinhe – Jiangnan (→ Dongguan)
  - 29 : Huangpu Railway Station – Huadu Square
- Regular-speed metro lines:
  - 1 : Xilang – Guangzhou East Railway Station
  - 2 : Jiahewanggang – Guangzhou South Railway Station
  - 4 : Huangcun – Nansha Passenger Port
  - 5 : Jiaokou – Huangpu New Port
  - 6 : Xunfenggang – Guangzhou Middle School
  - 7 : Yanshan – Meidi Dadao
  - 8 : Jiangfu – Haibang
  - 9 : Tanzhonglu – Gaozeng
  - 10 : Gaotangshi – Xilang
  - 10 spur line: Huawei (→ Foshan)
  - 11 : Guangzhou Railway Station – Pazhou – Guangzhou Railway Station
- Regular-speed metro lines (continued):
  - 12 : Xunfenggang – Higher Education Mega Center South
  - 12 spur line: Higher Education Mega Center North – Chenbian
  - 15 : Jiaomen – Nansha Passenger Port – Wanqingsha – Lingshan Island
  - 19 : Huangpu Railway Station – Nanpu West (→ Foshan)
  - 20 : Chigang Pagoda – Jiangnan
  - 23 : Chishajiao – Xintang Dadao
  - 30 : Guangzhou Avenue North – Education Park
  - 31 : Dongchong Town – Nansha Wetland Park
  - 32 : Nanguolu – Information Technology Park
  - 33 : Ronggui Railway Station – Qingshengdong
  - 34 : (Foshan →) Huangjinwei – Toubei
  - 35 : Dongjing – Huadong Coach Terminal
  - 36 : Fengcun – Baishantang
  - 38 : Lianxidadao – Shiliuchong
  - 39 : Jiahewanggang – Datian
  - 40 : Shihua – Changping
  - 40 spur line: Yonghe – Lihu
  - 41 : Bicun – Fangshi
  - 42 : Aotou – Conghua Coach Terminal
  - 43 : Nanjiao – GAC Base
  - Foshan 2 : (Foshan →) Guangzhou South Railway Station
  - Foshan 4 : (Foshan →) Xingyedadao
  - Foshan 5 : (Foshan →) Guangzhou Railway Station
  - Foshan 6 : (Foshan →) Baiyun Dongping
  - Foshan 7 : (Foshan →) Longxi
  - Foshan 8 : (Foshan →) Fangcun
  - Foshan 11 : (Foshan →) Hedong East
  - Dongguan 1 : Huangpu New Port (→ Dongguan)
  - Dongguan 4 : Zengcheng Railway Station (→ Dongguan)
  - Dongguan 13 : Shiqi (→ Dongguan)

=== Connections to neighboring cities ===
The Guangzhou Metro is actively constructing connections to neighboring cities.

==== Foshan ====
Foshan is already connected via the Guangfo Metro with connections via Line 7 and Foshan Metro Line 2 is now opened.

===== Guangzhou–Foshan metro connections =====
Guangzhou Metro lines to connect with FMetro lines
| # | Guangzhou Metro | FMetro | Status |
|---|---|---|---|
| 1 | Guangfo Metro | | In operation |
| 2 | Line 2 Line 7 Line 22 | Line 2 | In operation |
| 3 | Line 7 | Line 3 Line 10 Line 11 | Partially in operation (Line 3 only) |
| 4 | 10 | 6 | Planned |
| 5 | 17 | 7 | Planned |
| 6 | Extension of Guangzhou Metro Line 12 from Chatou to Lishui | | Planned |
| 7 | Extension of Guangzhou Metro Line 19 to Suiyan Lu | | Planned |

==== Dongguan ====
Dongguan city is proposing connections with Guangzhou Metro Line 13 and the Dongguan Metro.

==== Huizhou ====
Neighboring Huizhou city proposed in 2016 that Guangzhou Metro Line 16 be extended into Longmen County, achieving the integration of Huizhou and Guangzhou. In January 2018, Huizhou's mayor Mai Jiaomeng revealed that Huizhou was studying two connections with the Guangzhou Metro with Line 16 heading to Yonghan Town, Longmen County and Line 21 extended to Mount Luofu in Boluo County.

==== Zhongshan ====
In 2018, Guangzhou was studying the feasibility of extending Line 18 south into Zhongshan

==== Qingyuan ====
In 2018, Guangzhou was studying the feasibility of also extending Line 18 north into Qingyuan.

== Rolling stock ==
The Guangzhou Metro currently operates five different categories of rolling stock: A, B, D, L, and APM.

| Name | Image | Line(s) | Manufacturer(s) | Manufactured | Quantity | Cars per train | Notes |
|---|---|---|---|---|---|---|---|
| A1 | | 1 | Adtranz / Siemens Mobility | 1996 - 1999 | 21 | 6 | Briefly used on Line 2 previously before the A2 trains arrived. |
| A2 | | 1 8 | CNR Changchun / Bombardier Transportation | 2002 - 2005 | 26 | 6 | Previously used on Line 2 before the A5 trains arrived. |
| A3 | | 1 | CNR Changchun / Bombardier Transportation | 2006 | 8 | 6 | |
| A4 | | 2 | CSR Zhuzhou | 2009 - 2011 | 27 | 6 | Previously also used on Line 8 before the A2 trains were reallocated. |
| A5 | | 2 8 | CSR Zhuzhou | 2011 - 2014 | 32 | 6 | Originally meant for service on Lines 1, 2 and 8. |
| A6 | | 8 | CRRC Zhuzhou | 2018 - 2020 | 24 | 6 | |
| A7 | | 13 | CRRC Dalian | 2016 - 2017 | 17 | 8 | |
| A8 | | 8 | CRRC Changchun | 2022 - 2023 | 13 | 6 | Originally meant for service on Line 2. |
| A9 | | 11 | CRRC Zhuzhou | 2023 - 2024 | 55 | 8 | |
| A10 | | 12 | CRRC Zhuzhou | 2023 - 2024 | 47 | 6 | |
| A11 | - | 13 | CRRC Dalian | 2025 - | 42 | 8 | |
| B1 | | 3 | CSR Zhuzhou / Siemens Mobility | 2005-2007 | 40 | 6 | Initially operated in 3-car trainsets. Currently operates with 2 of these 3-car sets connected as a 6-car set. |
| B2 | | 3 | CSR Zhuzhou | 2009 - 2011 | 25 | 6 | |
| B3 | | Guangfo | CNR Changchun | 2009 - 2011 | 27 | 4 | Owned by Guangdong Guangfo Metro. |
| B3-I | | Guangfo | CRRC Qingdao Sifang | 2015 | 6 | 4 | Owned by Foshan Metro. |
| B3-II | | Guangfo | CRRC Qingdao Sifang | 2019-2020 | 18 | 4 | Owned by Guangdong Guangfo Metro. |
| B4 | | 3 | CSR Zhuzhou | 2011 - 2013 | 26 | 6 | |
| B5 | | 7 | CRRC Zhuzhou | 2015 - 2016 | 23 | 6 | |
| B6 | | 9 | CRRC Zhuzhou | 2016 - 2018 | 18 | 6 | |
| B7 | | 14 | CRRC Zhuzhou | 2017 - 2019 | 30 | 6 | |
| B8 | | 21 | CRRC Zhuzhou | 2016 - 2018 | 33 | 6 | |
| B9 | | 7 | CRRC Qingdao Sifang | 2019 - 2021 | 13 | 6 | |
| B10 | | 3 | CRRC Zhuzhou | 2021 - 2022 | 10 | 6 | |
| B11 | | 3 | CRRC Changchun | 2022 - 2023 | 18 | 6 | |
| B12 | | 7 | CRRC Zhuzhou | 2023 - 2025 | 19 | 6 | |
| B13 | | 10 | CRRC Zhuzhou | 2023 - 2025 | 43 | 6 | |
| B14 | | 14 | CRRC Zhuzhou | 2023 - 2025 | 16 | 6 | |
| D1 | | 18 22 | CRRC Zhuzhou | 2020-2021 | 25 | 8 | Express metro trains. Can operate at speeds of up to 160km/h. |
| D2 | | 18 22 | CRRC Zhuzhou | 2020-2021 | 15 | 8 | Express metro trains. Can operate at speeds of up to 160km/h. |
| L1 | | 4 | CSR Qingdao Sifang | 2005 - 2007 | 30 | 4 | |
| L2 | | 5 | CSR Qingdao Sifang | 2008 - 2010 | 30 | 6 | |
| L3 | | 6 | CSR Qingdao Sifang | 2011 - 2013, 2016 | 51 | 4 | |
| L4 | | 5 | CSR Qingdao Sifang | 2011 - 2013 | 32 | 6 | |
| L5 | | 4 | CRRC Qingdao Sifang | 2016 - 2017 | 27 | 4 | |
| L6 | | 6 | CRRC Guangdong | 2020 - 2022 | 38 | 4 | |
| L7 | | 5 | CRRC Guangdong | 2021 - 2023 | 14 | 6 | |
| APM1 | | APM | Bombardier Transportation | 2009 - 2010 | 7 (2 cars each) | 2 | |

== Fares and tickets ==
=== Fares ===
Fares of Guangzhou Metro currently range from ¥2 (a couple of stations) to ¥20 (the longest journeys). A journey shorter than 4 km costs ¥2; ¥1 is charged for every 4 km after 4 km, every 6 km after 12 km, and every 8 km after 24 km. A flat fare of ¥2 applies on the XPM line. Between 30 October 2010 and 30 October 2011, an additional, undiscountable ¥5 fee was charged for any journey to or from Airport South. Collection of such a fee was approved for one year in July 2010 and expired without extension.

If a passenger exits with no record of entry, the maximum possible fare will be charged. The maximum journey time is set such that it is always possible to complete the longest possible journey without penalty. It is currently set at 270 minutes. Otherwise, the maximum possible fare of 15 RMB will charged in addition to the normal fare.

Frequent user discounts are available when using smartcards and QR payments. A discount of 20% applies after ¥80 is spent on public transport in a calendar month, boosted to 50% after ¥200.

There was formerly provision for an extra charge of ¥2 for excess luggage, however this has since been removed from the fare rules.

=== Current ticket types ===
==== Single journey ticket ====
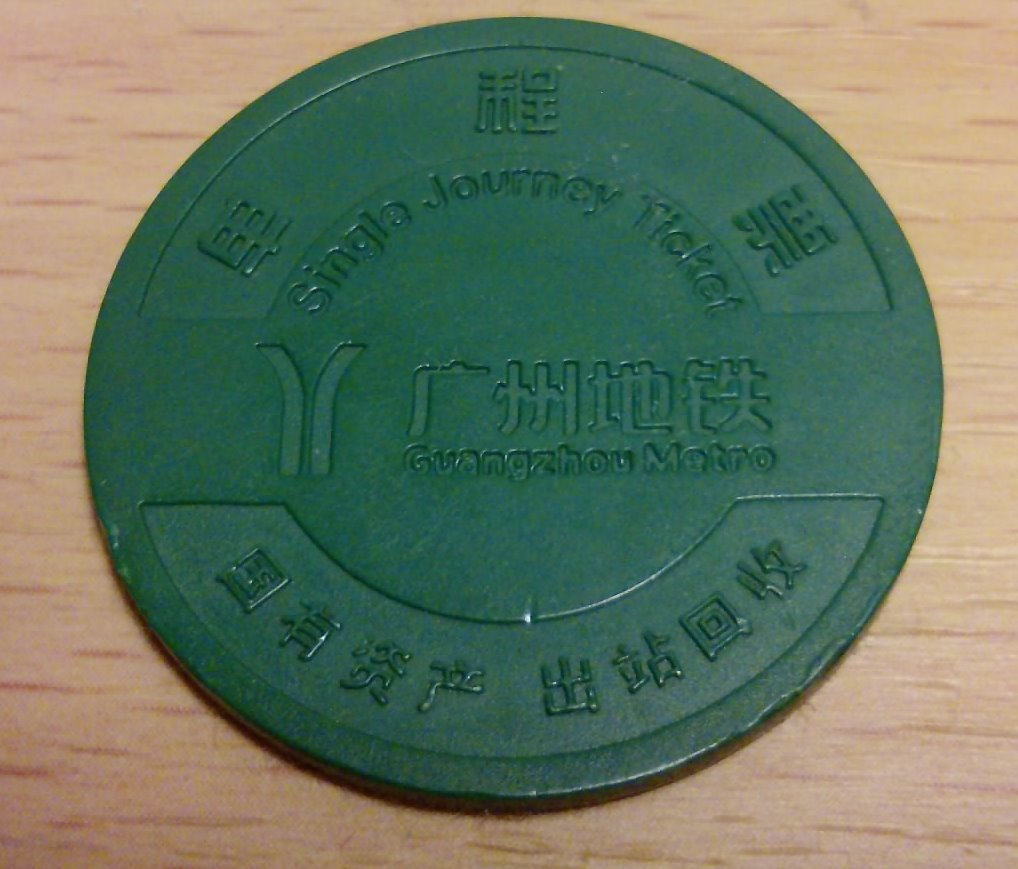
Guangzhou Metro single journey ticket

Single journey tickets can be bought at a kiosk at every station or at the automatic ticket vending machines. The ticket itself is a contactless radio-frequency plastic token, only valid on day of issue. To enter, it can simply be tapped at the ticket gate like a smartcard. When exiting, it is inserted into a slot for collection and reuse. Full base fares are charged for single journey tickets for individuals. Passengers travelling in groups of 30 or larger can enjoy a 10% discount.

==== Smartcards ====
A number of contactless smartcards are accepted by Guangzhou Metro. Yang Cheng Tong (Chinese: 羊城通; lit. 'Ram City Pass') is the most commonly used, however many other cards from other Chinese issuers are accepted via the China T-Union standard. Digital smartcards used via NFC on a smartphone can also be used.

Concession Yang Cheng Tong cards are available for students (half fare), seniors aged 60–64 (half fare) and seniors over 65 (free travel).

EMV cards

From 12 October 2025, Guangzhou Metro started accepting EMV payments on all lines. Cards issued by Visa, Mastercard, American Express, JCB and UnionPay are supported. For Visa and JCB card holders, only cards issued outside Mainland China are available for tap to ride.

Digital QR tickets

The Guangzhou Metro app can be used to generate a QR code for travel. Similar to smartcards, this QR code is scanned at tickets gates at either end of a journey. Shortly after exiting, the fare is automatically deducted from the user's mobile wallet.

This QR ticketing is also available embedded into Wechat and Alipay as mini apps. The same QR codes are accepted on some other metro systems in China (including Foshan Metro), and conversely QR codes issued by some other metro systems are also accepted on Guangzhou Metro.

==== Day pass ====
Art design of Guangzhou Metro day passes

Guangzhou Metro introduced day passes on 1 January 2013. A day pass holder can travel an unlimited number of times in the metro system during a limited period of validity starting from the first use. Two variants are currently available:

- One-day pass: ¥20 each and valid for 24 hours
- Three-day pass: ¥50 each and valid for 72 hours

Day passes are not rechargeable. They can be fully refunded until the first use, at which time they become nonrefundable. Used passes are not reclaimed, although they can be voluntarily recycled at drop boxes in the stations.

The passes are decorated with illustrations of the Cantonese language and cuisine to promote the local culture. The art design was favored by over 70% of those who responded to public opinion surveys compared to two other competing designs.

=== Discontinued ticket types ===
Guangzhou Metro discontinued the following ticket types in favor of Yang Cheng Tong.

==== Stored value ticket ====
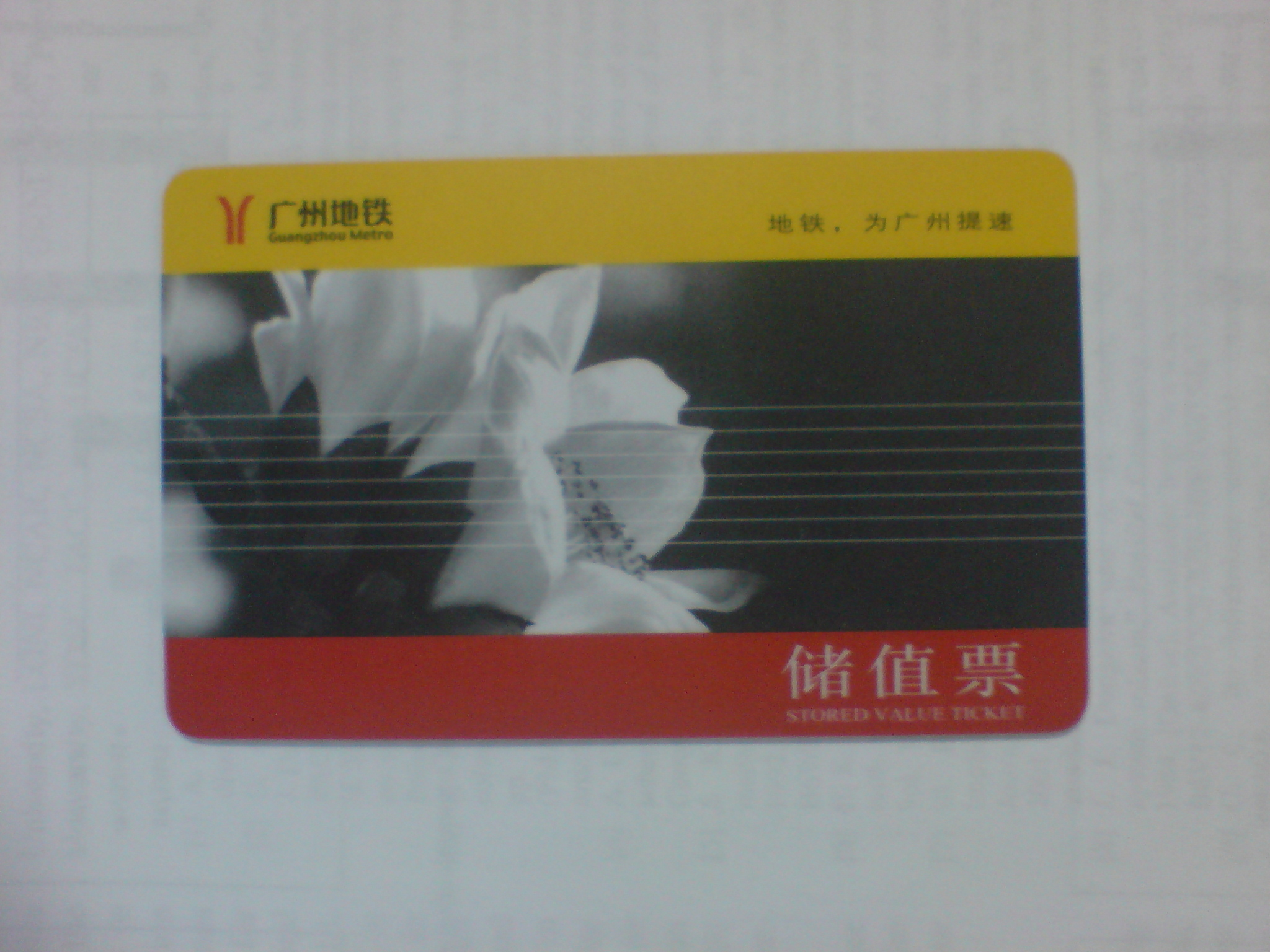
Guangzhou Metro stored value ticket

Stored value tickets were very similar to Yang Cheng Tong. Stored value tickets are not on sale anymore, but they will be presented as souvenirs to VIPs at the activities of the subway company and can have a 5% discount on fares.

==== Monthly pass ====
Monthly passes were introduced on 1 November 2008 and abolished on 1 May 2010. There were three types of monthly pass:

- ¥55 monthly pass for 20 single journeys
- ¥88 monthly pass for 35 single journeys
- ¥115 monthly pass for 50 single journeys

Each journey could travel from one station to any other station regardless of distance. A monthly pass was valid within a calendar month, not the one-month period from the first day it was used. Unused journeys in a month could not be rolled over to a pass for the following month.

==== Student pass and senior citizen pass ====
Both were issued by the metro company and used on metro only, allowing the holders to travel free or at half price.

==== MetroPay ====
MetroPay is a function integrated in Guangzhou Metro App on NFC (only Android phone). To use this function, simply tap your phone onto the reader on the turnstile to go through it. The MetroPay is no longer available for user effective from 20 May 2021.

== Power supply ==
Most Guangzhou Metro lines in operation are powered by 1,500 V DC. For power transmission, lines 1, 2, 3, 7, 8, 9, 10, 11, 12 and 13 as well as Guangfo Line use overhead lines, while lines 4, 5, 6, 14 and 21 use third rails. Lines 18 and 22 also use overhead wires, although at 25 kV 50 Hz AC. In contrast to the heavy-rail lines, the light-rail APM runs on 600 V 50 Hz 3-phase AC supplied by third rails.

== Controversies ==
=== Free rides for relatives of metro employees ===
Starting from 1997, the Guangzhou Metro implemented a policy that allowed free rides for, in addition to its employees, their relatives. The policy was exposed to the public after its validity was questioned at a hearing on metro fares in December 2005. At first, it was reported that up to three lineal kins of each metro employee were allowed free access to the metro. Based on Guangzhou Metro having about 6,000 employees at the time, participants of the hearing estimated that up to 18,000 relatives of metro employees could ride free at an approximate cost of ¥13 million per year.

In response to questions on the policy raised at the hearing, Lu Guanglin, then-General Manager of Guangzhou Metro, claimed that relatives of employees with free access would volunteer as security personnel of the metro. He cited counter-terrorism when explaining that the policy was not exclusively an employee benefit but also a safety measure. Guangzhou Metro later clarified that only the spouse and at most one pre-college child under 18 of each employee were allowed free access, limiting the number of such people to about 2,000. Free rides were strictly regulated and tracked, with abuse subject to disciplinary actions. An unnamed metro employee estimated that the actual cost per year was ¥3 million rather than ¥13 million.

Following its publicity, the policy sparked widespread criticism. A Nanfang Daily editorial criticised the policy as Guangzhou Metro exploiting public resources to its own interests. It also questioned the competence of relatives of metro employees in counter-terrorism. It further argued that if Guangzhou Metro indeed needed voluntary security personnel, it could have recruited them openly from the public. Such criticism was echoed by hearing participants as well as members of the Municipal People's Congress of Guangzhou. Guangzhou Metro officially abandoned the policy under pressure on 16 December 2005.

=== Ridership under-prediction ===
The first lines that were constructed, such as Lines 1, 2, and 8, used high capacity 6-car A-type trains in anticipation of heavy ridership. This choice later proved invaluable in the densely populated Guangzhou with all three aforementioned lines today having a peak daily usage of over 1 million passengers each. However, in the early days of operation, ridership of these lines was low. Ridership for Line 1 plateaued at 172000–176000 in the late 1990s and early 2000s even though it was projected to reach 290000 in 1998. The under utilization of these lines at the time allowed experts to insist on using lower capacity trains on newer lines and even led to the Guangzhou government being criticized for overinflating ridership predictions to approve metro projects. Preference was given to small-capacity trains and low-headway operation in the planning of later projects such as Lines 3, 5 and 6. Line 3 was to be built using smaller, lower capacity B-type rolling stock while Lines 5 and 6 were planned to use even lower capacity light metro four car L-type trains.

Initially the trains of Line 3 would only be three cars long and planned to gradually be extended into six car trains in the long-term future. This was in line with the conservative ridership projections at the time, with the Airport Section of Line 3 predicted in 2007 to have a long term peak demand of just over 20,000 pphpd by 2034. These ideas would soon prove utterly shortsighted with Line 3 trains being plagued with extreme overcrowding with significant sections of the line over 100% capacity only a few years after opening. Line 3 was forced to adopt its final long term configuration of six-car trains and low headway operation only five years after opening. However, as of 2014, with continuing growth in passenger demand, many sections of Line 3 are still over 100% capacity even after conversion to six car trains and low headway operation. The section crossing the Pearl River between Kecun and Canton Tower stations is the most congested, reaching 136% capacity. In June 2017, the ridership of Line 3 averaged over 2 million passengers per day and on 1 March 2019 the line carried 2.54 million passengers in a single day. With the busiest section carrying over 60,000 pphpd of passenger volume in 2018.

As the controversy surrounding Line 3 unfolded the low capacity design of Line 6, another downscaled line, drew concentrated but late criticism from local media in July 2009. Originally believed to have limited attraction to commuters, Line 6 was intended as an auxiliary line with a projected daily ridership of 428000 two years after opening and 507000 in nine years, These projections assumed the opening year of Line 6 was still 2010 and Guangzhou was less populated. Such projections were in line with ridership of the, at the time, underutilized Lines 1 and Line 2 prior to 2004. However, with the construction of Line 6 well underway using the original plan of four car L-type trains, a change to longer trains had become unrealistic as it would require modification to stations structures whose construction had been completed. An internal report of Guangzhou Metro also released in 2009 reckoned that using the same six car B-type rolling stock as Lines 3 and 7 would increase the capacity of Line 6 by 50%. Land expropriation and residence relocation would pose even greater challenges as evidenced by severe delays in the construction of the stations of Yide Lu and Shahe. In 2014, one year after opening, daily ridership on Line 6 has grown to 600,000 and continues to increase steadily, peaking at 858,000 passengers on 16 September 2016, a mere two years later. With the opening of Phase II extending the line from Changban to Xiangxue in late 2016 ridership continues to increase, averaging 850,000 passengers per day as of April 2018.

The congestion following the openings of Lines 3 and 6 made a profound impact on the planning and design of metro lines in Guangzhou. Line 5 had an urgent revision during early construction to support longer six car trains but still using a low capacity L-type design. Lines 7 was originally also planned to use the same four car light metro design as Line 6 but was redesigned and constructed to use higher capacity six car B-type trains. Before the opening of Line 6, the mayor of Guangzhou Chen Jianhua publicly admitted that planning of Line 6 lacked foresight and ridership estimates were too conservative. He predicts the line would be very crowded upon opening. He promised to ensure that future lines will be designed to use trains that are six or more cars long. Newer lines around the city center such as Line 11 and Line 13 use high capacity eight car A-type trains.

=== Quality inspection of Line 3 north extension ===
==== Exposure of quality issue ====
On 11 October 2010, news broke that the concrete structures of two connecting passages in the north extension of Line 3 between Jiahewanggang and Longgui had substandard compressive strength. The quality of the two connecting passages was found to be questionable as early as August 2009. But it not was brought to light until a technician who worked for a company that inspected their quality posted scanned copies of the original inspection reports in his blog in August 2010, and the media picked up the story in October 2010.

The connecting passages were intended as connections between two metro tunnels for the maintenance crew and emergency escape corridors for passengers. Their compressive strength was designed to reach 30 MPa. However, the lowest values measured in two inspections were only 21.9 MPa and 25.5 MPa, respectively. Guangzhou Metro and Beijing Chang Cheng Bilfinger Berger Construction Engineering Co., Ltd. (BCBB), contractor of the Jiahewanggang–Longgui section, commissioned two inspection companies to perform a total of three inspections. All three inspections reported results below standard. According to the technician who disclosed the issue and another technician who participated in the first inspection, possible consequences of weaker-than-standard concrete structures included collapse of the passages, blockage of groundwater drains, and even paralysation of the metro tunnels.

==== Alleged fraud attempts ====
According to the two technicians, BCBB rejected a negative inspection report and conspired with their employer company to produce a fraudulent positive report. In response, both the inspection company and BCBB denied their involvement in any fraud attempts. Su Zhenyu, a deputy manager of the Quality and Safety Division of Guangzhou Metro, admitted the quality issue with the connecting passages but maintained the innocence of Guangzhou Metro. According to him (Guangzhou Metro) never received the original inspection reports in 2009 and was unaware of the issue until it received them on 30 September 2010. Su blamed the incident on deceit by BCBB and declared the structures safe for train operation. Su's comments were acknowledged by Guangzhou Metro.

==== Reactions ====
According to Su (Guangzhou Metro) had launched an investigation into the incident and demanded remedial plans for fortifying the structures from the designer after its experts verified that the quality of the passage did not meet the design standard. In its official response (Guangzhou Metro) claimed that it had been monitoring the connecting passages since they were completed in August 2009 and noticed no cracks, deformation or leaks. It also commissioned a re-inspection in September 2010 and obtained results comparable to previous ones. Evaluation by the designer of the connecting passages based on these results recognised their structures as safe. Previously in 2009, the designer also evaluated one of the two connecting passages as safe upon demand of BCBB with the standard for its compressive strength at the lowest permissible value of 25 MPa.

In the wake of widespread media coverage, the Construction Commission of Guangzhou launched an investigation into the incident. The commission invited an independent expert group to inspect the connecting passages. The expert group reaffirmed that despite their quality was indeed below the design standard, the passages were safe for operation and needed not be strengthened or rebuilt. The commission also confirmed that BCBB violated regulations in concealing negative inspection reports from related parties. The cause of weaker-than-standard concrete structures was blamed by deputy mayor Su Zequn on cement being mixed manually instead of using machinery due to space limitation at the construction site.

The scheduled opening of the north extension of Line 3 on 30 October 2010 was eventually unaffected.

=== Universal free access in November 2010 ===
In January 2010, then-mayor Zhang Guangning revealed to the media that the local government was considering rewarding residents with an "Asian Games gift package" in acknowledgement of their support for the Games. On 27 September 2010, contents of the gift package were officially announced. Included was universal free access to public transit on 30 workdays in November and December 2010 that would coincide with the schedules of the 2010 Asian Games and Asian Para Games in urban areas excluding the districts of Panyu, Nansha and Huadu and the cities of Zengcheng and Conghua. The measure was intended to compensate for the inconvenience caused by a temporary traffic rule that would ban cars from the streets by the parity of the last digits of their license plates during the Games.

The free rides policy prompted unprecedented enthusiasm from local residents on 1 November 2010, the first day it went into effect. The metro system carried 7.80 million rides, doubling the figure of an average day. Ridership of the day exceeded the previous peak of 5.13 million on National Day 1 October 2010 by a significant margin and set a national record. Metro traffic remained intense in the days that followed. The daily ridership record was refreshed twice on 3 and 5 November 2010, reaching 7.844 million; total ridership amounted to 38.77 million over the entire workweek. Provisional flow control measures were put into force at all stations, but were utterly inadequate to contain traffic far beyond the design capacity of the metro system. Trains were often crammed, and stations were filled with people queuing in swarms to take a free ride. Guangzhou Metro estimated that when the Asian Games opened, daily ridership would surpass 8 million.

Five days after the free rides policy came into force, local authorities decided to rescind the free public transit offer starting from 8 November 2010 and replace it with a cash subsidy program as they deemed the enormous public response a potential security threat to the Games. Registered households and migrant households with presence in the city longer than half a year would each receive a public transit subsidy of ¥150 in cash; individuals in corporate households would each receive ¥50. Residents could claim the subsidies between 12 January and 31 March 2011. Public transit discount policies that were in effect before November 2010 remained unchanged.

=== Kangwang Lu sinkhole incident ===
Around 16:40 on 28 January 2013, in the immediate neighbourhood of the construction site of the Cultural Park station of Line 6 on Kangwang Lu (Chinese: 康王路), a sinkhole of approximately 100 m^{2} in area and 10 m in depth collapsed, consuming several houses and trees. Six collapses occurred within 40 minutes. Two more collapses occurred later at 21:45, when workers were pouring concrete into the sinkhole. Nearby roads were immediately closed for emergency engineering. The affected section of Kangwang Lu remained closed until the Spring Festival holidays and was closed for a second time on 12 February due to discovery of additional risks.

There were no casualties in the incident because metro construction workers detected geological anomalies 20 minutes before the initial collapse and promptly evacuated the neighbourhood. The sinkhole caused disruptions to electricity, gas and water supplies and drainage pipelines. Preliminary analysis blamed the incident on inaccurate geological drawings used for underground blast operations. In total, 412 households, 103 businesses and 69 warehouses were evacuated, and 257 residents were relocated. Guangzhou Metro offered provisional compensations that amounted to ¥50,000 for each collapsed business and ¥2600 for each resident of the collapsed houses, among other compensations.

== Overseas business ==
On February 25, 2020, the Guangzhou Metro Group and the Punjab Provincial Public Transport Authority of Pakistan signed a service contract for the operation and maintenance of the Orange Line of the Lahore Metro in Pakistan. The bid-winning consortium would undertake the operation and maintenance of the Lahore Metro Orange Line for eight years.

On 1 June 2026, Guangzhou Metro Group and Vietnam Railways officially signed a strategic cooperation agreement. The strategic cooperation agreement is considered one of the concrete measures to implement the cooperation direction of transportation infrastructure connectivity between China and Vietnam. On the same day, Guangzhou Metro Group Co, Ltd. Vietnam Representative office was established.

On 3 June 2026, Guangzhou Metro Group also signed a tripartite cooperation agreement with SMRT Corporation commercial divisions Shengdeli Life & Fashion Company and Jucheng Robotics Technology (Shenzhen) Co., Ltd. The plan will focus on three main directions: upgrading rail transit commercial operations, deploying intelligent equipment scenarios, and integrating international commercial resources.

== See also ==
- List of Guangzhou Metro lines & stations
- Guangzhou Tram
- Foshan Metro (FMetro)
- Pearl River Delta Metropolitan Region intercity railway
- Dongguan Rail Transit
- Shenzhen Metro
- Hong Kong MTR
- List of rapid transit systems
- List of metro systems
- Urban rail transit in China
- Metro systems by annual passenger rides
