= Guangzhou North Railway Station (Metro) =

Guangzhou Metro station

Guangzhou North Railway Station 广州北站
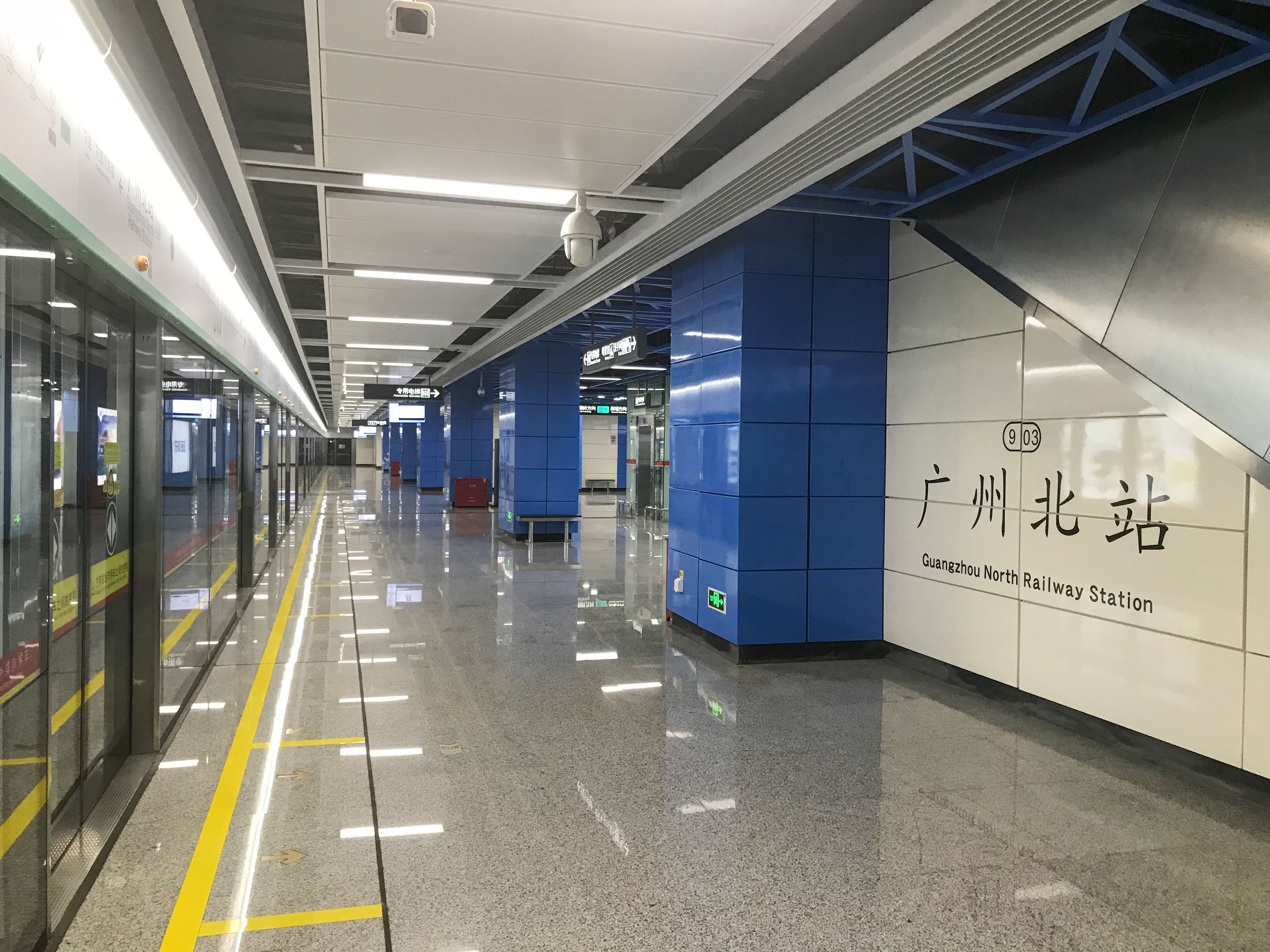
- Platform 2 (Towards Fei'eling)

Chinese name
- Simplified Chinese: 广州北站
- Traditional Chinese: 廣州北站
Transcriptions
Standard Mandarin
- Hanyu Pinyin: Guǎngzhōu Běi Zhàn
Yue: Cantonese
- Jyutping: gwong^{2}zau^{1} bak^{1}zaam^{6}

General information
- Location: Zhanxi Road (站西路); Huadu District, Guangzhou, Guangdong; China
- Operator: Guangzhou Metro Co. Ltd.
- Lines: Line 9; Guangzhou East Ring intercity railway (via Huadu); Guangzhou–Qingyuan intercity railway (via Huadu)
- Connections: Huadu

Construction
- Structure type: Underground
- Accessible: yes

Other information
- Station code: 903

History
- Opened: 28 December 2017; 8 years ago

Services
| Preceding station | Guangzhou Metro | Following station |
|---|---|---|
| Huadu Autocity towards Fei'eling | Line 9 | Huachenglu towards Gaozeng |
Transfer at Huadu
| Preceding station | Pearl River Delta Metropolitan Region Intercity Railway | Following station |
| Terminus | Guangzhou East Ring intercity railway transfer at Huadu | Huachengjie towards Panyu |
| Letong towards Feixia | Guangzhou–Qingyuan intercity railway transfer at Huadu | Terminus |
Location

Guangzhou North Railway Station (Chinese: 广州北站) is a metro station of Line 9 of the Guangzhou Metro. The metro station opened on 28 December 2017. It will be served by Line 24 in the future.

The metro station is located at the west side of the Huadu railway station and the Guangzhou North railway station.

== Station layout ==
| G | - | Exits |
| L1; Concourse | Lobby | Customer Service, Shops, Vending machines, ATMs |
| L2; Platforms | Platform 1 | 9 towards Gaozeng (Huachenglu) |
| L2; Platforms | Island platform, doors will open on the left |
| L2; Platforms | Platform 2 | 9 towards Fei'eling (Huadu Autocity) |

== Exits ==
| Exit number | Exit location |
|---|---|
| Exit A | Xiuquan Xilu |
| Exit B | Xiuquan Xilu |
| Exit C | Huadu railway station, Guangzhou North railway station |
| Exit D | Xiuquan Xilu |
