= Huachenglu station (Guangzhou Metro) =

Guangzhou Metro station

Coordinates: 23°22′56.36″N 113°12′26.06″E

Huachenglu 花城路
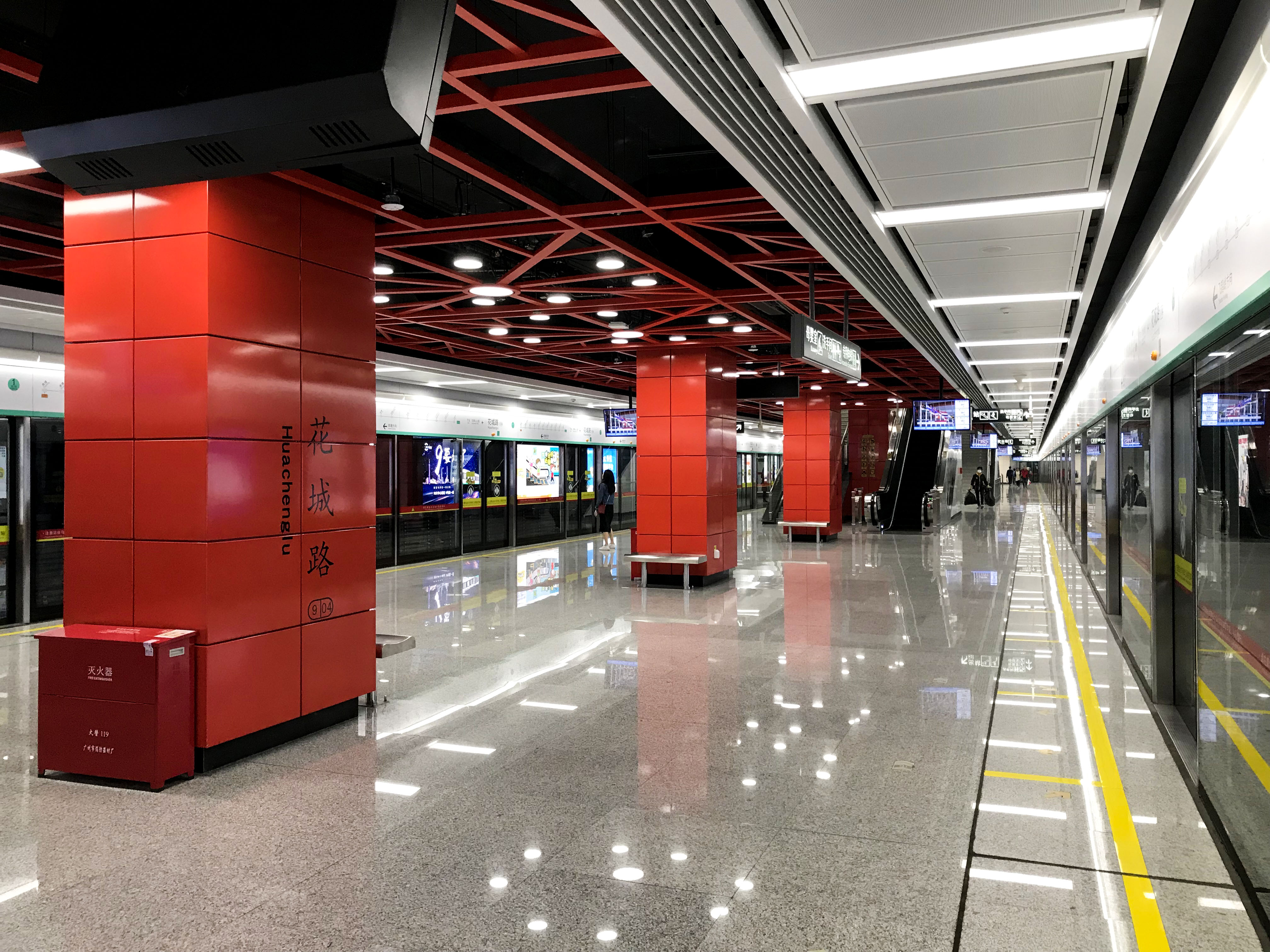
- Platform of Huachenglu

General information
- Location: Xiuquan Avenue (秀全大道) and Huacheng Road (花城路); Huadu District, Guangzhou, Guangdong; China
- Operator: Guangzhou Metro Co. Ltd.
- Line: Line 9

Other information
- Station code: 904

History
- Opened: 28 December 2017; 8 years ago

Services
| Preceding station | Guangzhou Metro | Following station |
|---|---|---|
| Guangzhou North Railway Station towards Fei'eling | Line 9 | Huaguoshan Park towards Gaozeng |
Location

Huachenglu station (Chinese: 花城路站; pinyin: Huāchénglù Zhàn; Jyutping: faa^{1}sing^{4}lou^{6} zaam^{6}) is a station of Line 9 of the Guangzhou Metro. It started operations on 28 December 2017.

The adjacent Guangzhou North railway station gained a metro station on 28 December 2017, but due to the construction of the Guangzhou–Qingyuan intercity railway, the metro station is inaccessible from the national rail station. Therefore, passengers need to get off at Huachenglu station and walk along the road, or take a shuttle bus.

== Station layout ==
| G | - | Exits |
| L1; Concourse | Lobby | Customer Service, Shops, Vending machines, ATMs |
| L2; Platforms | Platform 1 | 9 towards Gaozeng (Huaguoshan Park) |
| L2; Platforms | Island platform, doors will open on the left |
| L2; Platforms | Platform 2 | 9 towards Fei'eling (Guangzhou North Railway Station) |

== Exits ==
| Exit number | Exit location |
|---|---|
| Exit C | Huacheng Lu |
| Exit D | Xiuquan Dadao |
