= Huadu Square station =

Guangzhou Metro station

Coordinates: 23°24′14.02″N 113°13′0.88″E

Huadu Square 花都广场
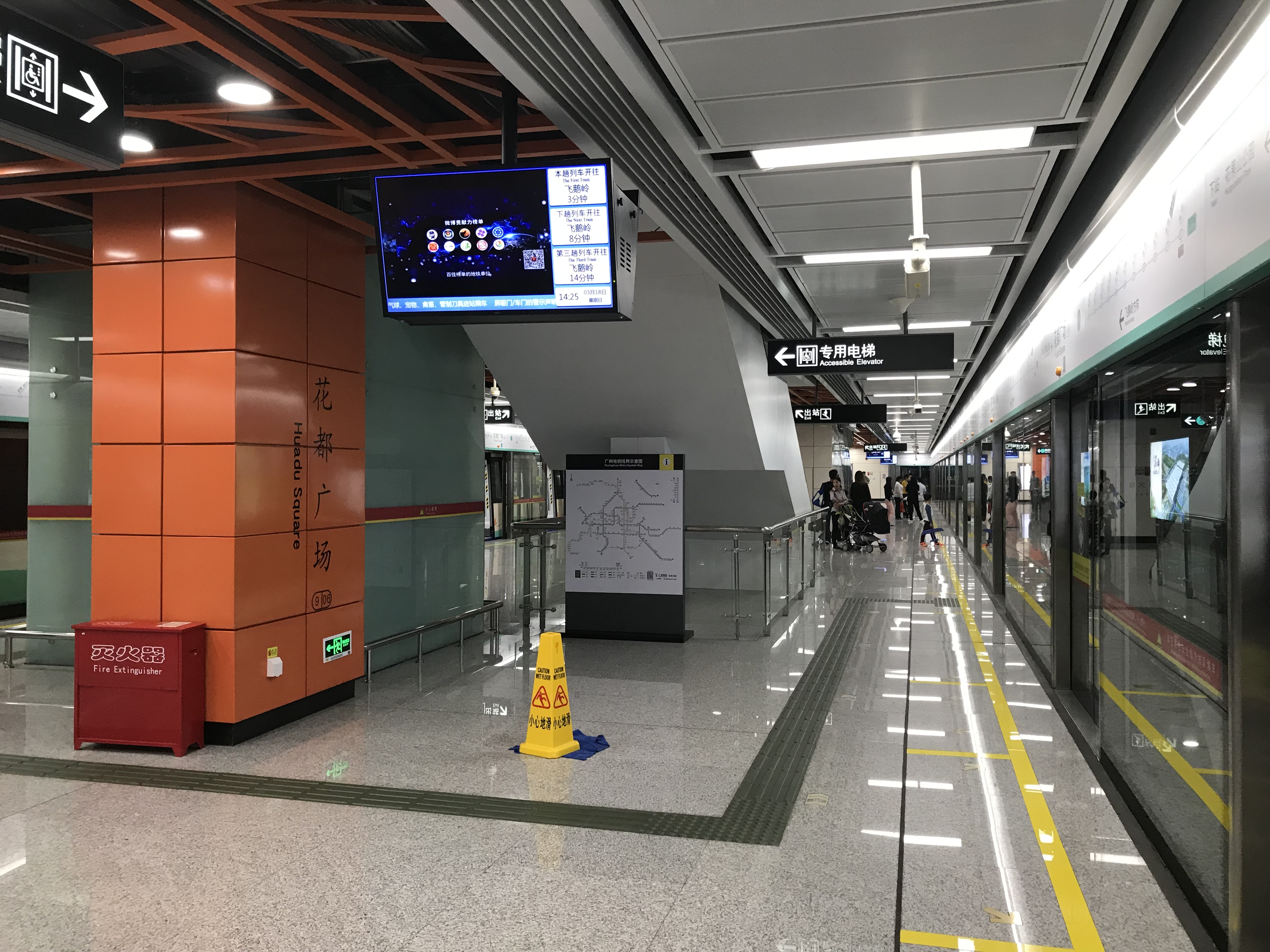
- Platform of Huadu Square

Chinese name
- Simplified Chinese: 花都广场站
- Traditional Chinese: 花都廣場站
Transcriptions
Standard Mandarin
- Hanyu Pinyin: Huādū Guǎngchǎng Zhàn
Yue: Cantonese
- Jyutping: faa^{1}dou^{1} gwong^{2}coeng^{4} zaam^{6}

General information
- Location: Yingbin Avenue (迎宾大道) and Tiangui Road (天贵路); Huadu District, Guangzhou, Guangdong; China
- Operator: Guangzhou Metro Co. Ltd.
- Line: Line 9

Other information
- Station code: 906

History
- Opened: 28 December 2017; 8 years ago

Services
Preceding station	Guangzhou Metro	Following station
Huaguoshan Park towards Fei'eling	Line 9	Ma'anshan Park towards Gaozeng
Location

Huadu Square station (Chinese: 花都广场站) is a station of Line 9 of the Guangzhou Metro. It started operations on 28 December 2017.

== Station layout ==
G	-	Exits
L1; Concourse	Lobby	Customer Service, Shops, Vending machines, ATMs
L2; Platforms	Platform 1	9 towards Gaozeng (Ma'anshan Park)
L2; Platforms	Island platform, doors will open on the left
L2; Platforms	Platform 2	9 towards Fei'eling (Huaguoshan Park)

== Exits ==
Exit number	Exit location
Exit A	Tiangui Lu
Exit B	Yingbin Dadao
Exit C	Yingbin Dadao
