= Huadu Autocity station =

Guangzhou Metro station

Coordinates: 23°22′56.18″N 113°10′29.3″E

Huadu Autocity 花都汽车城
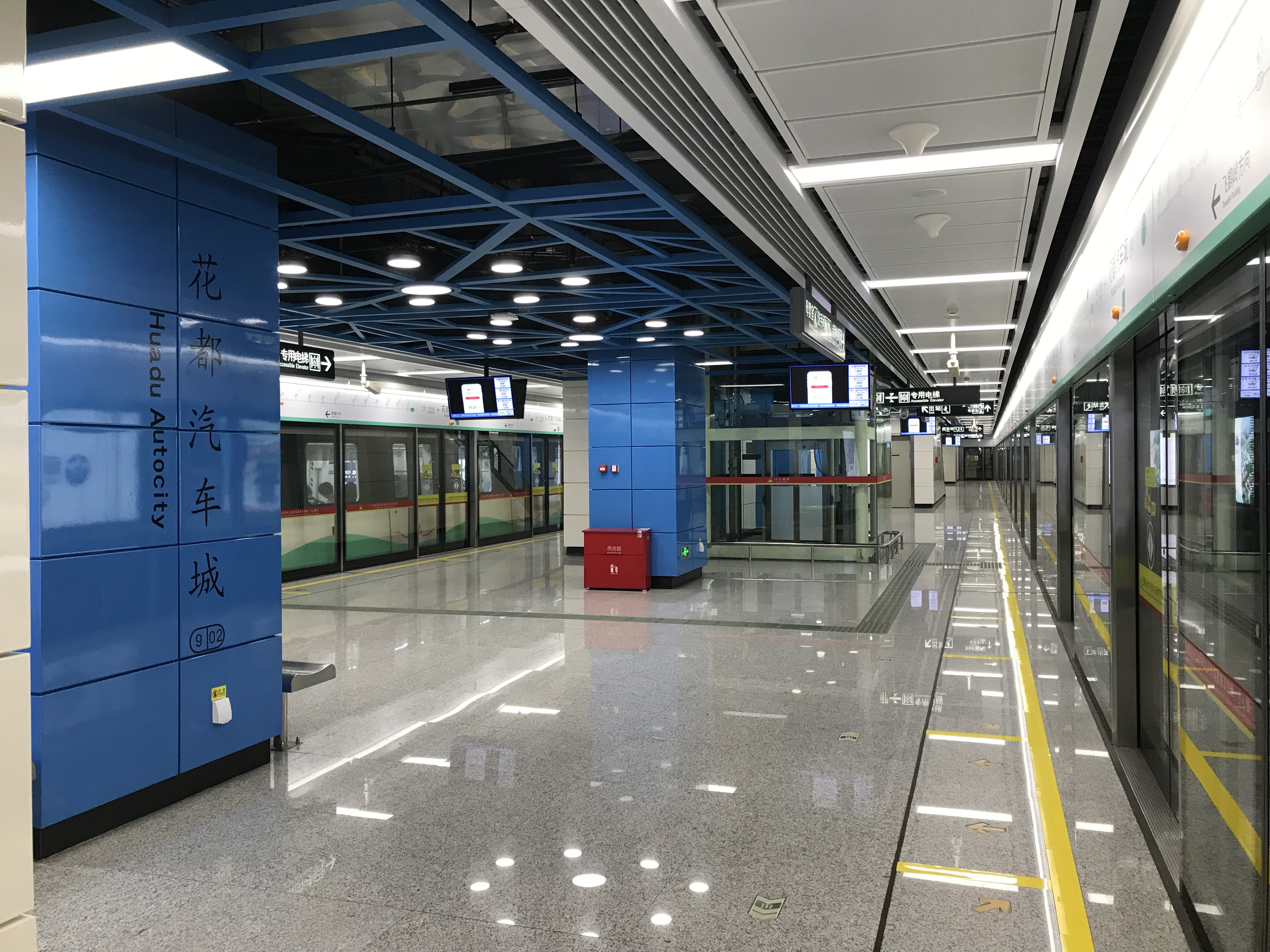
- Platform of Huadu Autocity

Chinese name
- Simplified Chinese: 花都汽车城站
- Traditional Chinese: 花都汽車城站
Transcriptions
Standard Mandarin
- Hanyu Pinyin: Huādū Qìchēchéng Zhàn
Yue: Cantonese
- Jyutping: faa^{1}dou^{1} hei^{3}ce^{1}sing^{4} zaam^{6}

General information
- Location: Fengshen Avenue (风神大道); Huadu District, Guangzhou, Guangdong; China
- Operator: Guangzhou Metro Co. Ltd.
- Line: Line 9

Other information
- Station code: 902

History
- Opened: 28 December 2017; 8 years ago

Services
Preceding station	Guangzhou Metro	Following station
Fei'eling Terminus	Line 9	Guangzhou North Railway Station towards Gaozeng
Location

Huadu Autocity station (Chinese: 花都汽车城站) is a station of Line 9 of the Guangzhou Metro. It started operations on 28 December 2017.

== Station layout ==
G	-	Exits
L1; Concourse	Lobby	Customer Service, Shops, Vending machines, ATMs
L2; Platforms	Platform 1	9 towards Gaozeng (Guangzhou North railway station)
L2; Platforms	Island platform, doors will open on the left
L2; Platforms	Platform 2	9 towards Fei'eling (Terminus)

== Exits ==
Exit number	Exit location
Exit A	Fengshen Dadao
Exit B	Fengshen Dadao
Exit C	Fengshen Dadao
Exit D	Fengshen Dadao
