= Liantang station (Guangzhou Metro) =

Guangzhou Metro station

Coordinates: 23°23′30.11″N 113°14′24.51″E

Liantang 莲塘
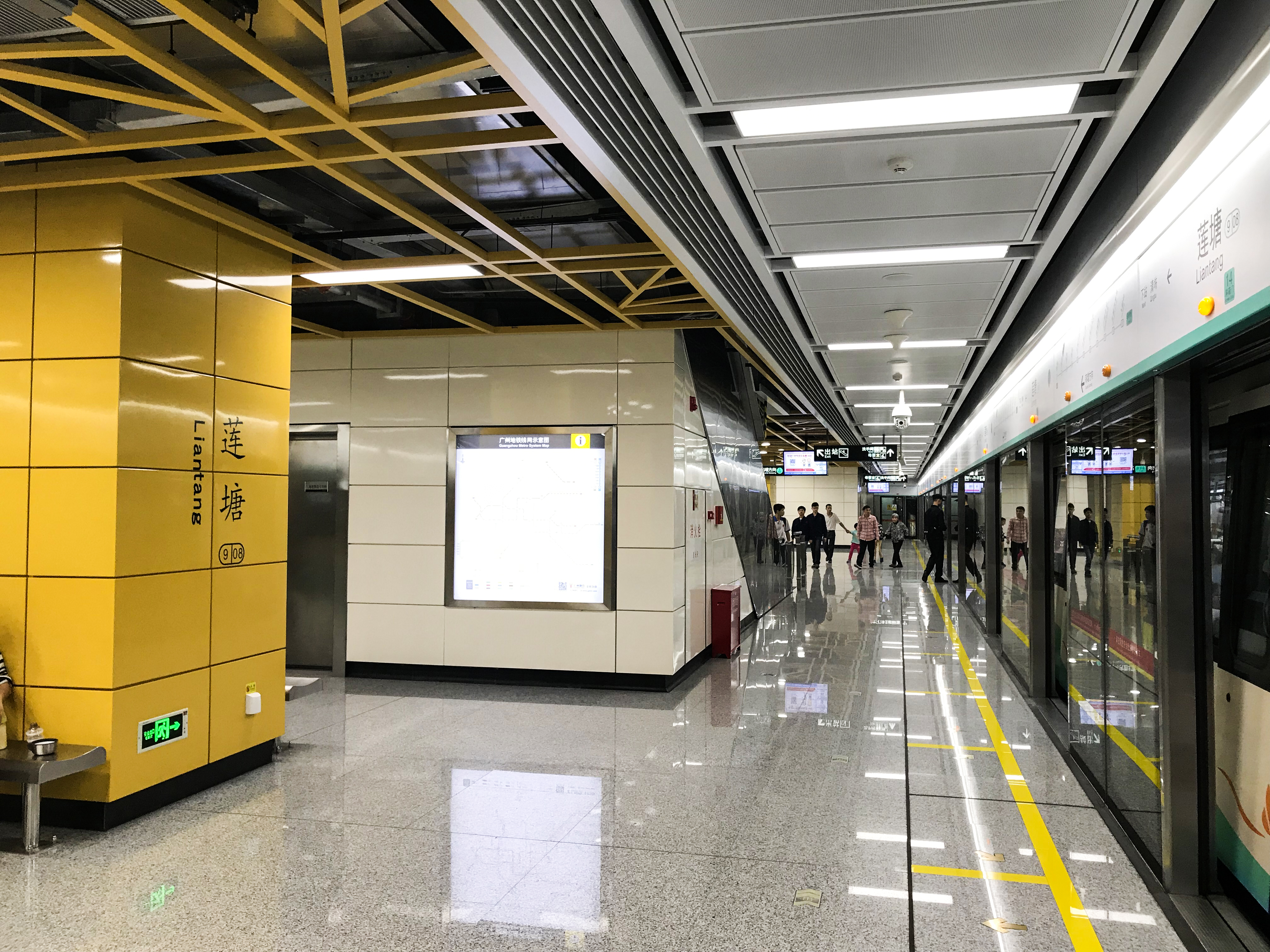
- Platform of Liantang

Chinese name
- Simplified Chinese: 莲塘站
- Traditional Chinese: 蓮塘站
Transcriptions
Standard Mandarin
- Hanyu Pinyin: Liántáng Zhàn
Yue: Cantonese
- Jyutping: lin^{4}tong^{4} zaam^{6}

General information
- Location: Yingbin Avenue (迎宾大道) south of Shangye Avenue (商业大道); Huadu District, Guangzhou, Guangdong; China
- Operator: Guangzhou Metro Co. Ltd.
- Line: Line 9

Other information
- Station code: 908

History
- Opened: 28 December 2017; 8 years ago

Services
Preceding station	Guangzhou Metro	Following station
Ma'anshan Park towards Fei'eling	Line 9	Qingbu towards Gaozeng
Location

Liantang station (Chinese: 莲塘站) is a station of Line 9 of the Guangzhou Metro. It started operations on 28 December 2017.

== Station layout ==
G	-	Exits
L1; Concourse	Lobby	Customer Service, Shops, Vending machines, ATMs
L2; Platforms	Platform 1	9 towards Gaozeng (Ma'anshan Park)
L2; Platforms	Island platform, doors will open on the left
L2; Platforms	Platform 2	9 towards Fei'eling (Qingbu)

== Exits ==
Exit number		Exit location
Exit A	A1	Yingbin Dadao
Exit A	A2	Yingbin Dadao
Exit B		Yingbin Dadao
