= Huadu Stadium =

Stadium in Guangzhou, China

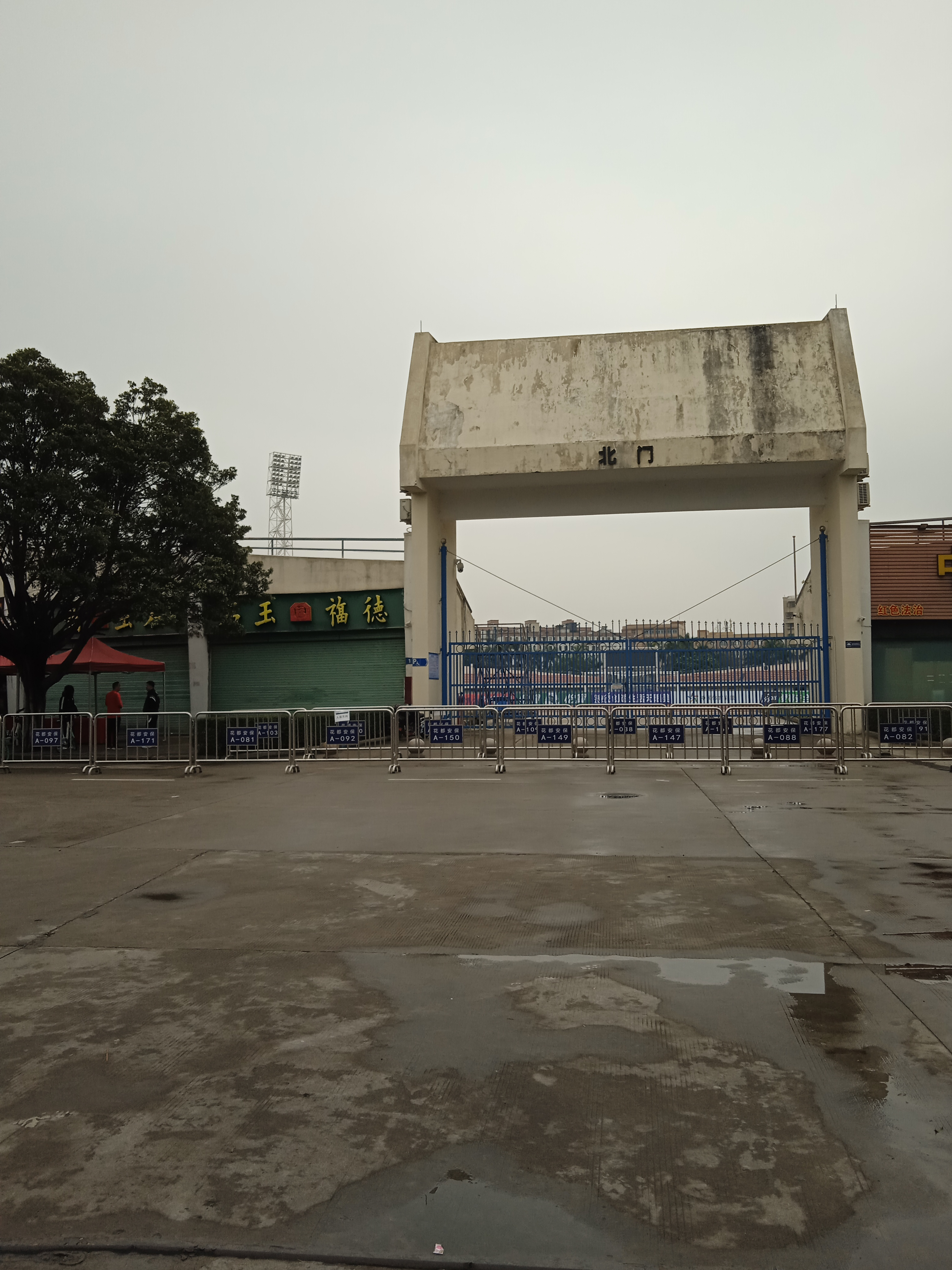
- The stadium's north gate
- Interactive map of Huadu Stadium
- Location: Guangzhou, Guangdong, China
- Coordinates: 23°23′15″N 113°12′51″E
- Capacity: 13,394
- Public transit: 9 at Huaguoshan Park

Construction
- Groundbreaking: 1993
- Opened: 2001

Tenants
- Guangzhou (2022, 2024); Guangdong GZ-Power (2024)

Huadu Stadium is a stadium in Guangzhou, China. It was a venue for the 16th Asian Games and has hosted some international football matches. It was most recently the home ground of China League One club Guangzhou.
