= Ma'anshan Park station =

Guangzhou Metro station

Ma'anshan Park 马鞍山公园
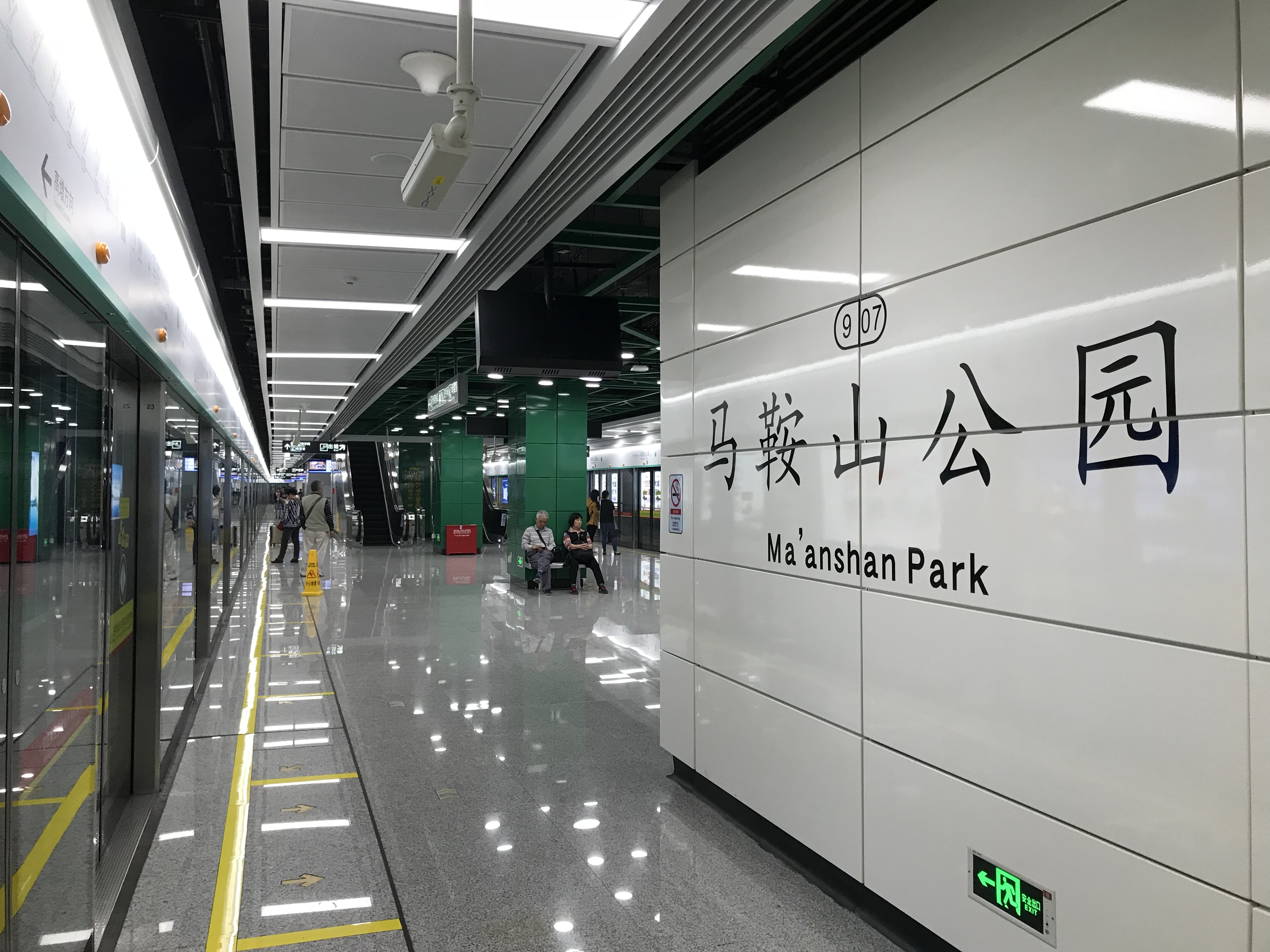
- Platform of Ma'anshan Park

Chinese name
- Simplified Chinese: 马鞍山公园站
- Traditional Chinese: 馬鞍山公園站
Transcriptions
Standard Mandarin
- Hanyu Pinyin: Mǎ'ānshān Gōngyuán Zhàn
Yue: Cantonese
- Jyutping: maa^{5}on^{1}saan^{1} gung^{1}jyun^{4*2} zaam^{6}

General information
- Location: Huadu District, Guangzhou, Guangdong; China
- Coordinates: 23°24′07″N 113°13′57″E
- Operator: Guangzhou Metro Co. Ltd.
- Line: Line 9

Other information
- Station code: 907

History
- Opened: 28 December 2017; 8 years ago

Services
Preceding station	Guangzhou Metro	Following station
Huadu Square towards Fei'eling	Line 9	Liantang towards Gaozeng
Future services
Huachengjie Terminus	Line 18	Fenghuangnanlu towards Wanqingsha
Location

Ma'anshan Park station (Chinese: 马鞍山公园站) is a station on Line 9 of the Guangzhou Metro. It started operations on 28 December 2017.

== Station layout ==
G	-	Exits
L1; Concourse	Lobby	Customer Service, Shops, Vending machines, ATMs
L2; Platforms	Platform 1	9 towards Gaozeng (Liantang)
L2; Platforms	Island platform, doors open on the left
L2; Platforms	Platform 2	9 towards Fei'eling (Huadu Square)

== Exits ==
Exit number	Exit location
Exit C	Baishou Nanlu
Exit D	Baishou Nanlu

== Future expansions ==
Line 18 will be extended to this station as part of its northern extension.

Future station layout

G	-	Exits
L1; Concourse	Lobby	Customer Service, Shops, Vending machines, ATMs
L2; Platforms	18 Equipment Area	Station equipments
L2; Platforms	Platform 1	9 towards Gaozeng (Liantang)
L2; Platforms	Island platform, doors open on the left
L2; Platforms	Platform 2	9 towards Fei'eling (Huadu Square)
L3; Platforms	Platform 3	18 towards Huachengjie (Huachengjie)
L3; Platforms	Island platform, doors open on the left
L3; Platforms	Platform 4	18 towards Wanqingsha (Fenghuang Nanlu)
