= Qingbu station =

Guangzhou Metro station

Coordinates: 23°22′41″N 113°15′04″E

Qingbu 清㘵
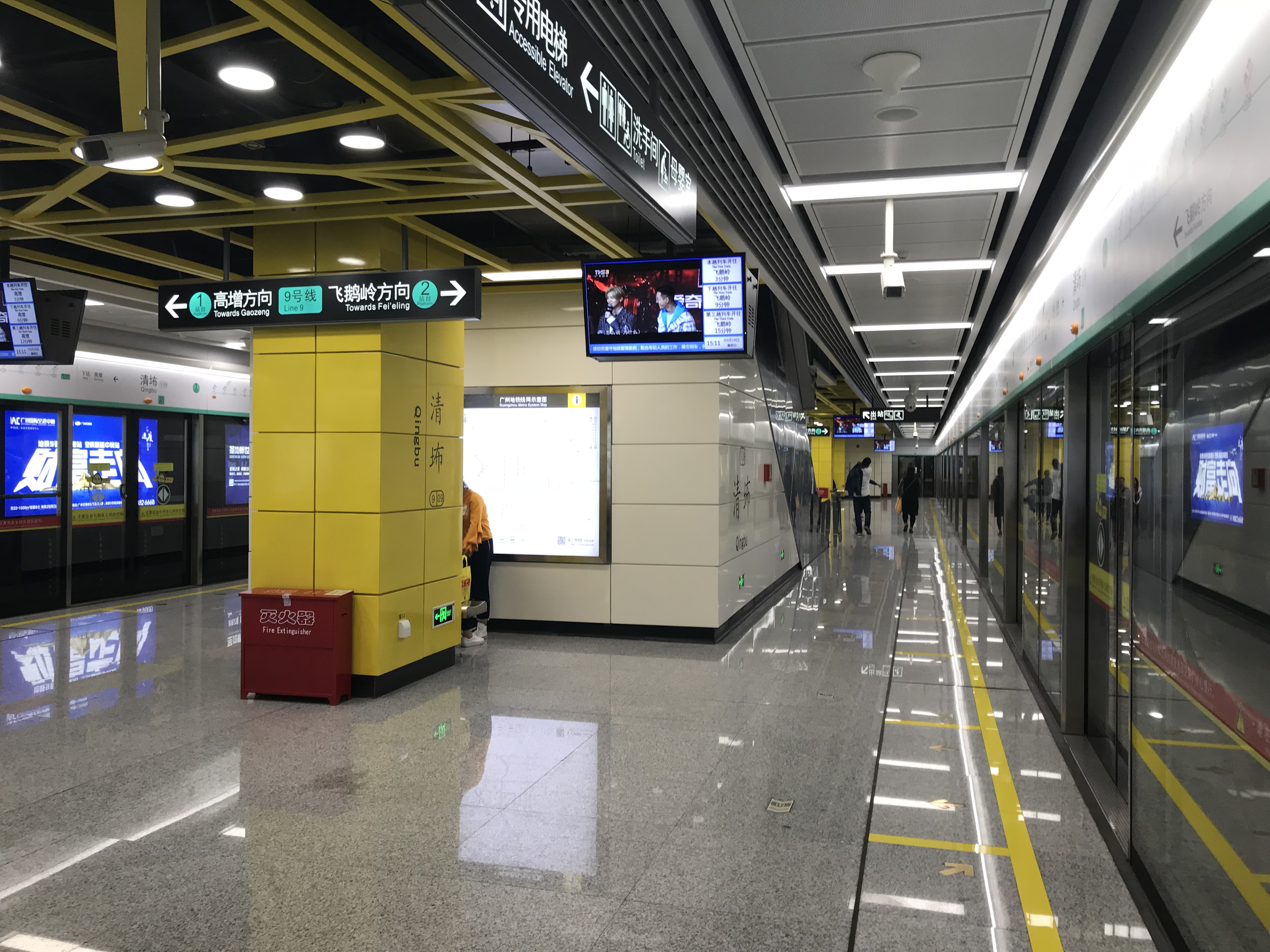
- Platform of Qingbu

General information
- Location: Yingbin Avenue (迎宾大道) and Jinghu Avenue (镜湖大道); Huadu District, Guangzhou, Guangdong; China
- Operator: Guangzhou Metro Co. Ltd.
- Line: Line 9

Other information
- Station code: 909

History
- Opened: 28 December 2017; 8 years ago

Services
Preceding station	Guangzhou Metro	Following station
Liantang towards Fei'eling	Line 9	Qingtang towards Gaozeng
Location

Qingbu station (Chinese: 清㘵站; pinyin: Qīngbù Zhàn; Jyutping: cing^{1}bou^{3} zaam^{6}) is a station of Line 9 of the Guangzhou Metro. It started operations on 28 December 2017.

== Station layout ==
G	-	Exits
L1; Concourse	Lobby	Customer Service, Shops, Vending machines, ATMs
L2; Platforms	Platform 1	9 towards Gaozeng (Qingtang)
L2; Platforms	Island platform, doors will open on the left
L2; Platforms	Platform 2	9 towards Fei'eling (Liantang)

== Exits ==
Exit number	Exit location
Exit A	Yingbin Dadao
Exit B	Yingbin Dadao
Exit C	Yingbin Dadao
Exit D	Yingbin Dadao
