= Huaguoshan Park station =

Guangzhou Metro station

Coordinates: 23°23′23.50″N 113°12′46.68″E

Huaguoshan Park 花果山公园
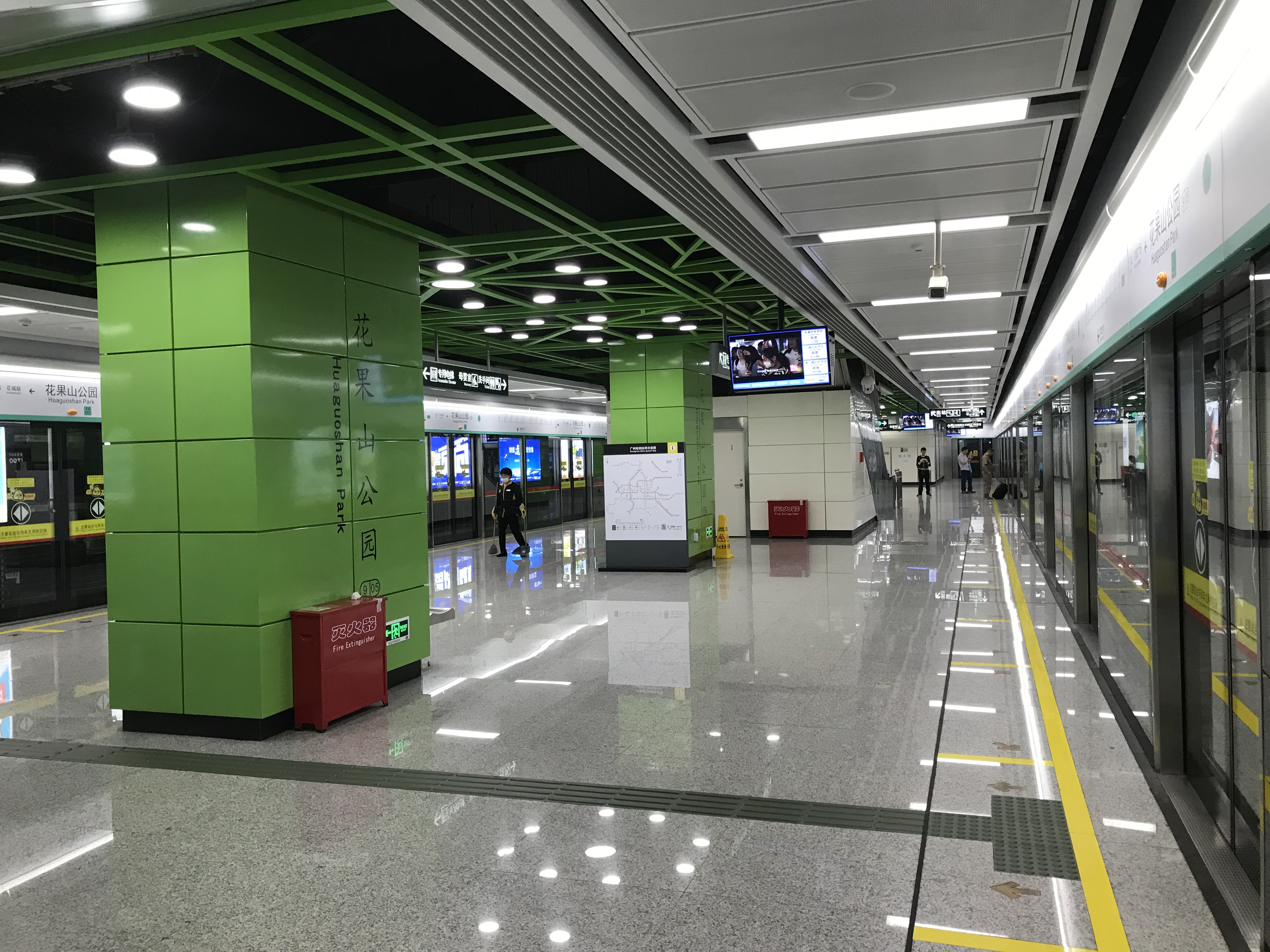
- Platform of Huaguoshan Park

Chinese name
- Simplified Chinese: 花果山公园站
- Traditional Chinese: 花果山公園站
Transcriptions
Standard Mandarin
- Hanyu Pinyin: Huāguǒshān Gōngyuán Zhàn
Yue: Cantonese
- Jyutping: faa^{1}gwo^{2}saan^{1} gung^{1}jyun^{4*2} zaam^{6}

General information
- Location: Huadu District, Guangzhou, Guangdong; China
- Operator: Guangzhou Metro Co. Ltd.
- Line: Line 9

Other information
- Station code: 905

History
- Opened: 28 December 2017; 8 years ago

Services
Preceding station	Guangzhou Metro	Following station
Huachenglu towards Fei'eling	Line 9	Huadu Square towards Gaozeng
Location

Huaguoshan Park station (Chinese: 花果山公园站) is a station of Line 9 of the Guangzhou Metro. It started operations on 28 December 2017.

== Station layout ==
G	-	Exits
L1; Concourse	Lobby	Customer Service, Shops, Vending machines, ATMs
L2; Platforms	Platform 1	9 towards Gaozeng (Huadu Square)
L2; Platforms	Island platform, doors will open on the left
L2; Platforms	Platform 2	9 towards Fei'eling (Huachenglu)

== Exits ==
Exit number		Exit location
Exit A	A1	Yunshan Dadao
Exit A	A2	Yunshan Dadao
Exit C		Chayuan Nanlu
