= Huadu railway station =

Railway station in Huadu District, Guangzhou, Guangdong

Huadu 花都
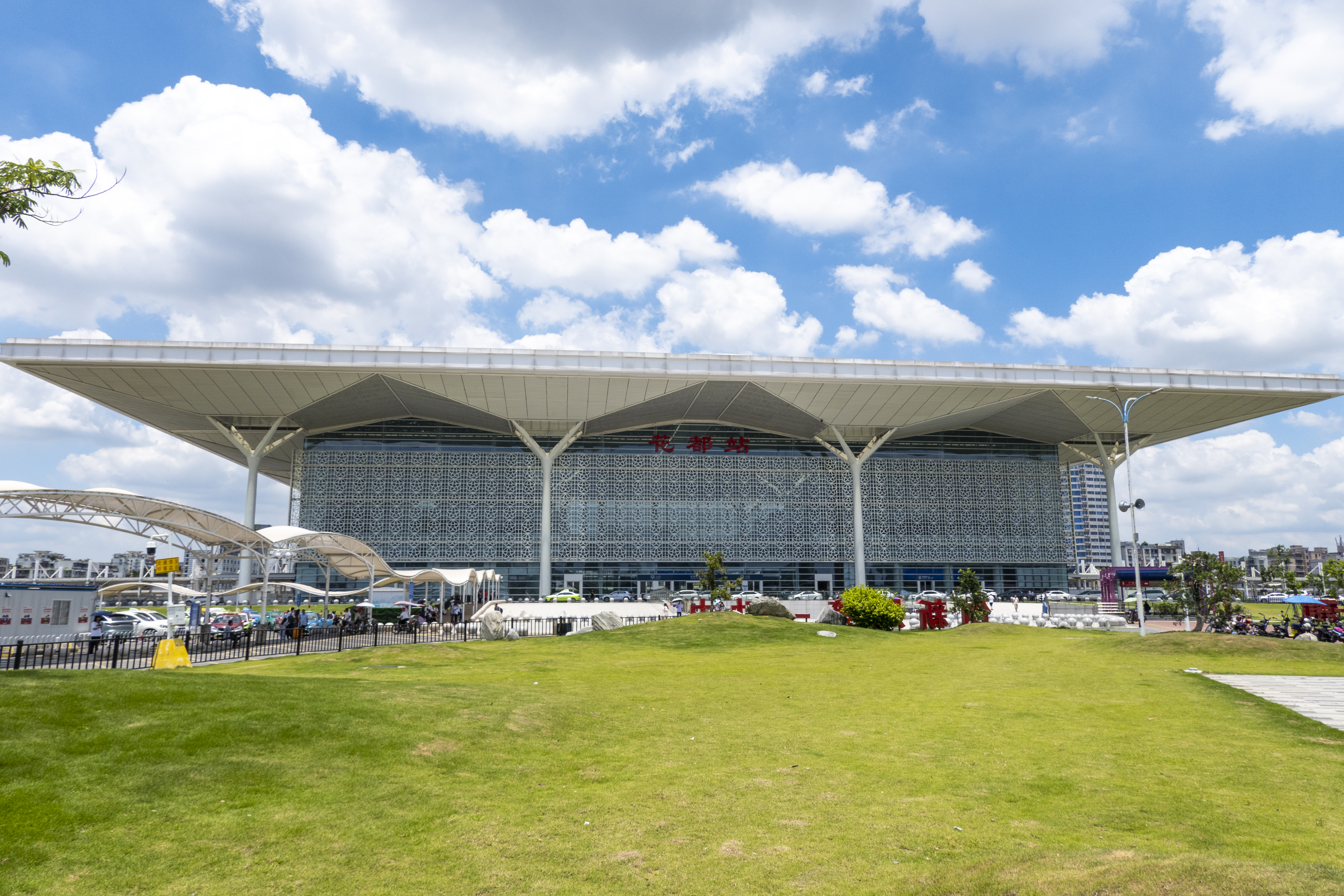
- Exterior

General information
- Location: Zhanxi Road (站西路); Huadu District, Guangzhou, Guangdong; China
- Coordinates: 23°22′47″N 113°11′47″E
- Operated by: Guangdong Intercity
- Lines: Guangzhou East Ring intercity railway; Guangzhou–Qingyuan intercity railway
- Platforms: 6 (2 island platforms and 2 side platforms)
- Tracks: 6
- Connections: Guangzhou North railway station 9 Guangzhou North Railway Station

Construction
- Structure type: Elevated
- Accessible: Yes

Other information
- Station code: HAA (Pinyin: HDU)

History
- Opened: 30 November 2020 (5 years ago)

Services
Preceding station	Pearl River Delta Metropolitan Region Intercity Railway	Following station
through to Guangzhou–Qingyuan intercity railway	Guangzhou East Ring intercity railway	Huachengjie towards Panyu
Letong towards Feixia	Guangzhou–Qingyuan intercity railway	through to Guangzhou East Ring intercity railway
Location

Huadu Railway Station (Chinese: 花都站; pinyin: Huādū Zhàn) is a railway station located in Huadu District, Guangzhou, Guangdong, China. The railway station is located on the west side of Guangzhou North railway station and is used by Guangqing ICR, Guangzhou East Ring ICR. It opened on 30 November 2020. Passengers can get off at Guangzhou North Railway Station of Guangzhou Metro Line 9 to reach there.
