= GZB =

GZB may refer to:

- GZB, the Indian Railways station code for Ghaziabad Junction railway station, Uttar Pradesh, India
- GZB, the Pinyin code for Guangzhou North railway station, Guangdong, China
- Gereformeerde Zendingsbond (GZB), protestant missionary society from the Netherlands, founded churches in Indonesia
