= Qingtang station =

Guangzhou Metro station

Coordinates: 23°22′20″N 113°15′46″E

Qingtang 清塘
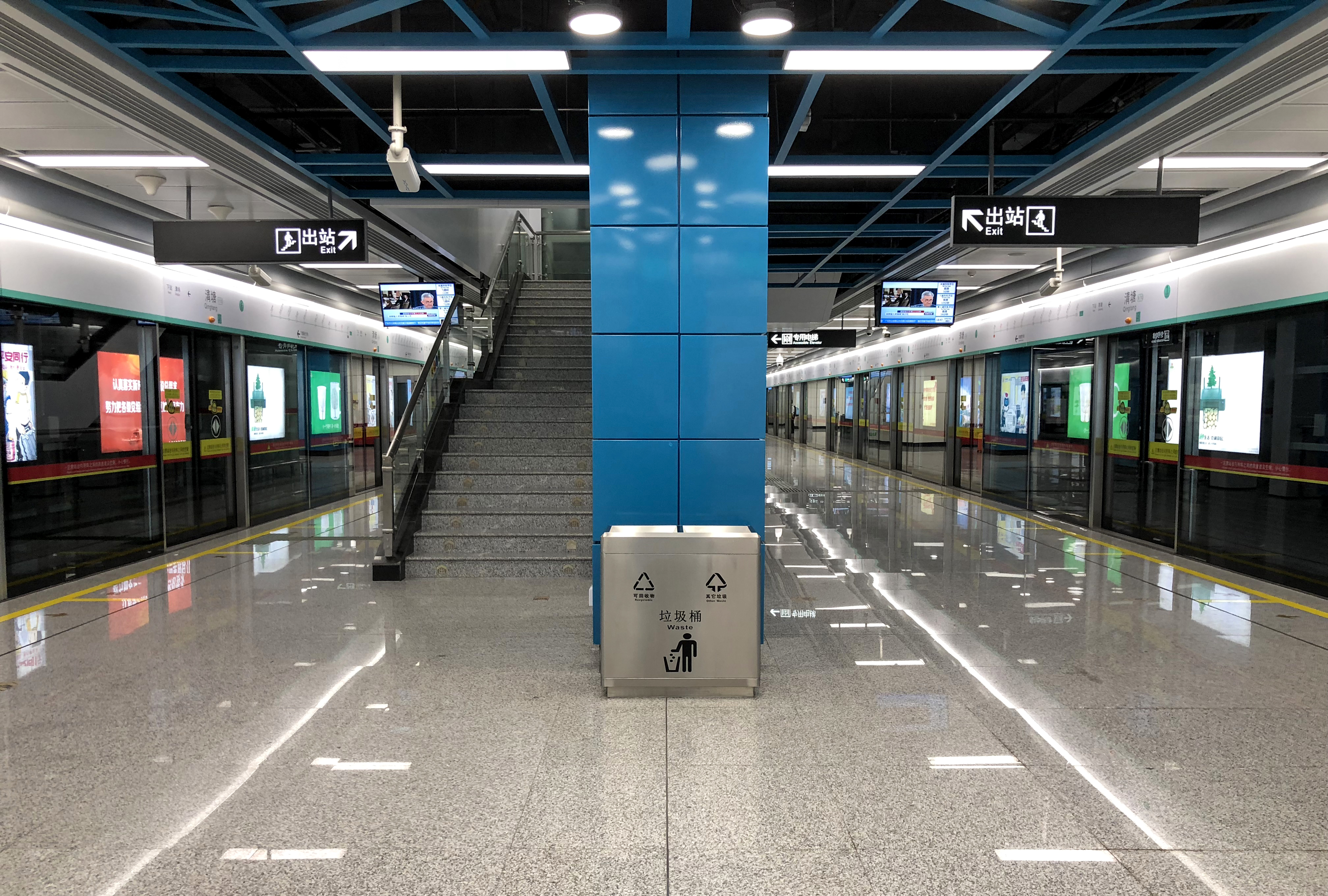

General information
- Location: Yingbin Avenue (迎宾大道) and Qingtang Road (清塘路); Huadu District, Guangzhou, Guangdong; China
- Operated by: Guangzhou Metro Co. Ltd.
- Line: Line 9
- Platforms: 2 (1 island platform)

Construction
- Structure type: Underground

Other information
- Station code: 910

History
- Opened: 28 December 2017; 8 years ago

Services
Preceding station	Guangzhou Metro	Following station
Qingbu towards Fei'eling	Line 9	Gaozeng Terminus
Location

Qingtang station (Chinese: 清塘站; pinyin: Qīngtáng Zhàn; Jyutping: cing^{1}tong^{4} zaam^{6}) is a station of Line 9 of the Guangzhou Metro. It started operations on 30 June 2018, 6 months after the opening of the line.

== Station layout ==
G	-	Exits
L1; Concourse	Lobby	Customer Service, Shops, Vending machines, ATMs
L2; Platforms	Platform 1	9 towards Gaozeng (Terminus)
L2; Platforms	Island platform, doors will open on the left
L2; Platforms	Platform 2	9 towards Fei'eling (Qingbu)

== Exits ==
Exit number	Exit location
Exit A	Yingbin Dadao
Exit B	Yingbin Dadao
Exit C	Yingbin Dadao
Exit D	Yingbin Dadao
