= Huachengjie railway station =

Railway station in Guangzhou, China

Huachengjie 花城街
- Platform 2

General information
- Location: Huadu District, Guangzhou, Guangdong; China
- Operator: Guangdong Intercity
- Lines: Guangzhou East Ring intercity railway; Line 18 (opening 2027)
- Platforms: 2 (2 side platforms)
- Tracks: 2

Construction
- Structure type: Underground
- Accessible: Yes

Other information
- Station code: HCA (Pinyin: HCJ)

History
- Opened: 30 November 2020 (5 years ago)

Services
Preceding station	Pearl River Delta Metropolitan Region Intercity Railway	Following station
Huadu Terminus	Guangzhou East Ring intercity railway	Huashanzhen towards Panyu
Future services
Preceding station	Guangzhou Metro	Following station
Terminus	Line 18	Ma'anshan Park towards Wanqingsha
Location

Huachengjie railway station (Chinese: 花城街站; pinyin: Huāchéngjiē zhàn) is an underground railway station located in Huadu District, Guangzhou, Guangdong, China. It opened with the Eastern section of the Guangzhou–Foshan circular intercity railway on 30 November 2020.

== Future development ==
Line 18

The North extension of Guangzhou Metro Line 18 will extend to Huachengjie.
