= Guangzhou–Heyuan high-speed railway =

Planned railway line in Guangdong, China

Overview
- Status: Planned
- Locale: Guangdong
- Termini: Guangzhou North; Heyuan East

Service
- Operator(s): China Railway High-speed

Technical
- Line length: 190 km (118 mi)
- Track gauge: 1,435 mm (4 ft 8 1/2 in)
- Electrification: 50 Hz 25,000 V

The Guangzhou–Heyuan high-speed railway is a planned railway line in Guangdong, China. It will be 190 kilometres (120 mi) long.

== Route ==
The line starts at Guangzhou North railway station and heads east. Stops are planned at Baiyun Airport Terminal 3, Conghua, Yonghan, and Longmen. The eastern terminus will be Heyuan East. The line is planned as part of a new high-speed rail channel between Zhanjiang and Meizhou.
