= Jingtang Lotus Roots =

Aquatic Plant

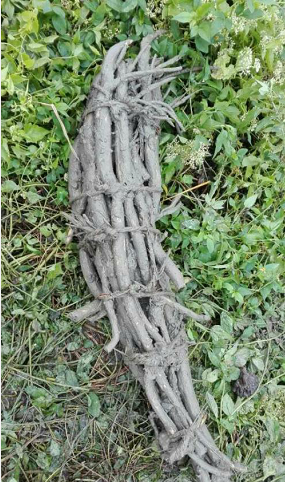
Jingtang Lotus Root

The Jingtang Lotus Root (京塘莲藕) is a pink-flowering aquatic plant. It most likely originated in Jingtang, Huadu District, Guangzhou City, Guangdong Province, where it was cultivated for its vegetative parts and seeds. The most commonly eaten component of the plant is its taproot, although its green leaves are eaten as well. This plant is an aquatic perennial. Under favorable circumstances, its seeds may remain fertile for many years. The oldest lotus germination recorded involved 1,300-year-old seeds which were recovered from a dry lake bed in northeastern China.

== History ==
The Jingtang Lotus Root was discovered over 800 years ago in a lotus pond. More than 1,000 villagers collectively dug lotus roots out of the ground by hand in mud ponds. An example of this is present within the village of Jingtang, Huadu in northern Guangzhou. It is a local custom to begin extracting lotus roots about seven days before the Dongzhi Festival (Winter Solstice) in the Chinese Lunar Calendar.

== Myths and legends ==
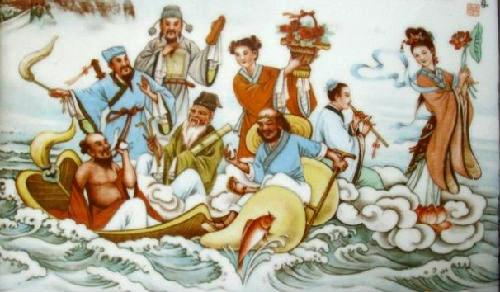
The Eight Immortals

According to a legend, Eight Immortals once visited the home of an immortal being named Xiangu to eat green litchi. Suddenly they felt an evil air rush up. Tieguai Li, upon smelling it, said, "There must be a plague." The Eight Immortals saw the barren hillsides and dried out fields cracking from the heat. Hundreds of villagers were starving and some collapsed on the ground, while others were attempting to flee the village. The Eight Immortals looked very anxious, Tieguai Lee smiled: "Do not worry, I have an idea." He took out a Dan from one side of the gourd, put it into his mouth and bit. Then, with saliva, he spat and it began to rain which made the barren hills and fields become green and the pond filled with water. The powerless villagers rushed to the side of the ridge to collect wild vegetables where they encountered the Eight Immortals. After seeing the Eight Immortals, they calmed down. However, Xiangu was still worried, because the villagers were thin, weak, and had no food. She remembered the merciful Avalokitesvara who gave her a few lotus seeds and said to her: "When you see the humans suffering, you can throw these lotus seed to save the world.” So, she quickly took out lotus seeds from the sleeves and threw them down into a large reservoir. After a while, the pond grew lotus flowers and lotus leaves. The Eight Immortals' work was done. The following year, the winter came and the lotus leaf withered. The experienced peasants knew that the lotus root was ripe and led the villagers to dig the lotus root and eat it. It is believed that everyone who eats this lotus root becomes strong and healthy, causing the following generations down the line to thrive.

== Appearance ==
Sections are slender - about 4 to 5 centimetres (1.6 to 2.0 in), with each small part measuring about 40 cm (16 in).

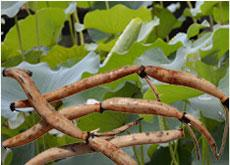
Freshly harvested Jingtang Lotus Root

The shape of the plant is the same as a common lotus root. However, the appearance of the plant's body differs slightly. The lotus root, when produced from the pond, looks rough, thin and long. It is slightly thicker than a human thumb, with a length of more than 1 to 2 metres (3 ft 3 in to 6 ft 7 in) looking like tree roots.

== Botany ==
The lotus roots are planted in the soil of the pond or river bottom, while the leaves float on top of the water surface or are held well above it. The flowers are usually found on thick stems rising several centimeters above the leaves. The leaves may be as large as 60 cm (24 in) in diameter, while the showy flowers can be up to 20 cm (7.9 in) in diameter.

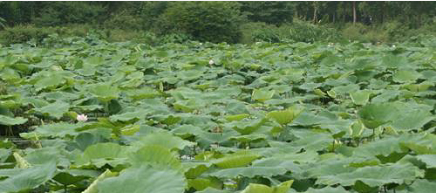
Unharvested Jingtang Lotus Root

== Production ==
The previous lotus pond was about 20 acres and produced about 20,000 lotus roots. At the end of 2008, the village set up an agricultural development company and expanded the pond to 70 acres. Subsequently, the planting area reached 66,667 square meters. With the increased size, the output rose to about five or six million kilograms. The stems of lotus roots are made of mostly water. When the water is evaporated during production, the nutrients within become concentrated.

== Usage ==
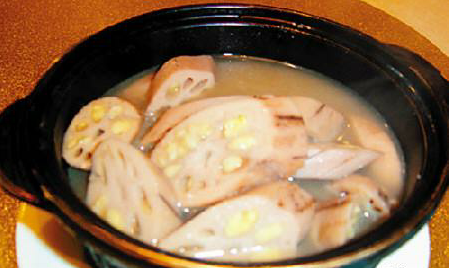
Jingtang Lotus Root Soup made of lotus root stuffed with sticky (glutinous) rice

Lotus roots are often pickled in rice vinegar, sugar, chili or garlic. It has a crunchy texture with sweet-tangy flavors. In Asian cuisine, it is popular with salad, prawns, sesame oil or coriander leaves. Lotus roots have been found to be rich in dietary fiber, Vitamin C, potassium, thiamine, riboflavin, Vitamin B6, phosphorus, copper, and manganese, while being very low in saturated fat.

Lotus roots have been used in Traditional Chinese Medicine to treat a wide variety of ailments, from bleeding to hematemesis, and have been shown to contain anti-fungal, anti-inflammatory, anti-pyretic, and anti-anxiety properties. Recent studies have also shown that the consumption of taurine, a free-radical found in lotus roots, have positive health effects including easing inflammation, acting as a neuroprotector, protecting against diabetes, and helping regulate immune systems.

== Storage ==
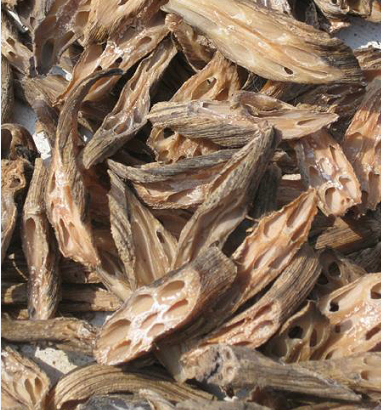
Dried Jingtang Lotus Root

If exposed to air, it will last for 1–2 days. After being harvested, the lotus root quickly wilts, decays and becomes brown.

== Distinct features ==
The Jingtang lotus root has three distinct features that differ from the common lotus root.

Firstly, the lotus root grown in the pond is thin and long, while the common lotus root is thick and short.

Secondly, after the lotus root harvest in winter, people do not need to plant it again. As long as there is water, the lotus leaf grows every spring. The lotus root does not need to be tended to, as long as the root has water source.

Digging the Jingtang lotus roots

Typically, the lotus root shares communal ownership within a village. Every year after the winter solstice, the village chooses a day for harvesting the lotus root. The whole village takes part in the harvest. The person who digs out a root gets to keep it. When digging, people do not use tools, because the lotus root is thin and long. Also, they grow in the middle of the deep mud, so people must dig by hand in order to dig it all out. The lotus root in the above photo can be sold for a high price, so it is prudent for villages to be careful while digging. The longer the lotus root is, the higher price it fetches. On average, they grow to be one metre (three feet three inches) long. The longest lotus root found was two metres (six feet seven inches) and weighed four to five pounds (one point eight to two point three kilograms).
