= Second Guangzhou–Shenzhen high-speed railway =

Planned railway line in Guangdong, China

The Second Guangzhou–Shenzhen high-speed railway (Chinese: 广深第二高铁) is a planned high-speed railway line in Guangdong, China. It will link Guangzhou and Shenzhen.

== Specification ==
The proposed route starts at Guangzhou North railway station and passes through Baiyun Airport Terminal 3, Yuzhu, Dongguan, and ends at Shenzhen Airport railway station. The length of the proposed line is 132 kilometres (82 mi).

== Significance ==
This line will become the second 350 kilometres per hour (220 mph) route between Guangzhou and Shenzhen, following the Guangzhou to Shenzhen section of the Guangzhou–Shenzhen–Hong Kong Express Rail Link, which opened in 2011. The slower Guangzhou–Shenzhen railway also connects the two cities.
