= Line 9 (Guangzhou Metro) =

Line of the Guangzhou Metro

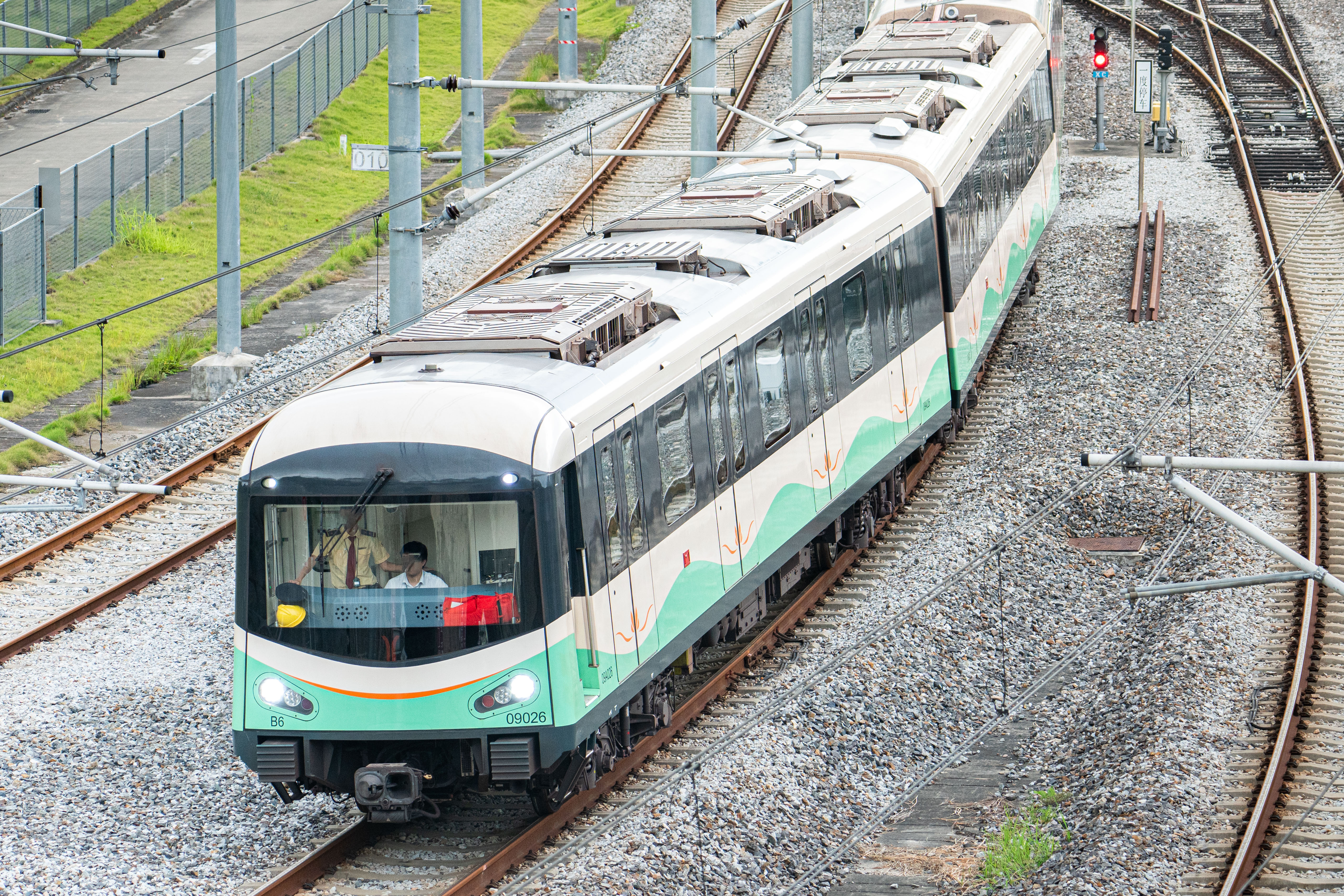
- Line 9 train

Overview
- Other name(s): M14e (2010 plan name); M9 (2013 plan name); Huadu line (花都线)
- Status: Operational
- Owner: City of Guangzhou
- Locale: Baiyun and Huadu districts Guangzhou, Guangdong
- Termini: Fei'eling; Gaozeng
- Stations: 11

Service
- Type: Rapid transit
- System: Guangzhou Metro
- Services: 1
- Operator: Guangzhou Metro Corporation
- Daily ridership: 111,800 (2025 daily average)

History
- Opened: 28 December 2017; 8 years ago

Technical
- Line length: 19.21 km (11.94 mi)
- Track gauge: 1,435 mm (4 ft 8 1/2 in)
- Electrification: Overhead lines, 1,500 V DC
- Operating speed: 95 km/h (59 mph)

Line 9
- Simplified Chinese: 广州地铁9号线
- Traditional Chinese: 廣州地鐵9號線
Transcriptions
Standard Mandarin
- Hanyu Pinyin: Guǎngzhōu Dìtiě Jiǔ Hào Xiàn
Yue: Cantonese
- Yale Romanization: Gwóngjāu Deihtit Gáu Houh Sin
- Jyutping: gwong^{2}zau^{1} dei^{6}tit^{3} gau^{2} hou^{6} sin^{3}

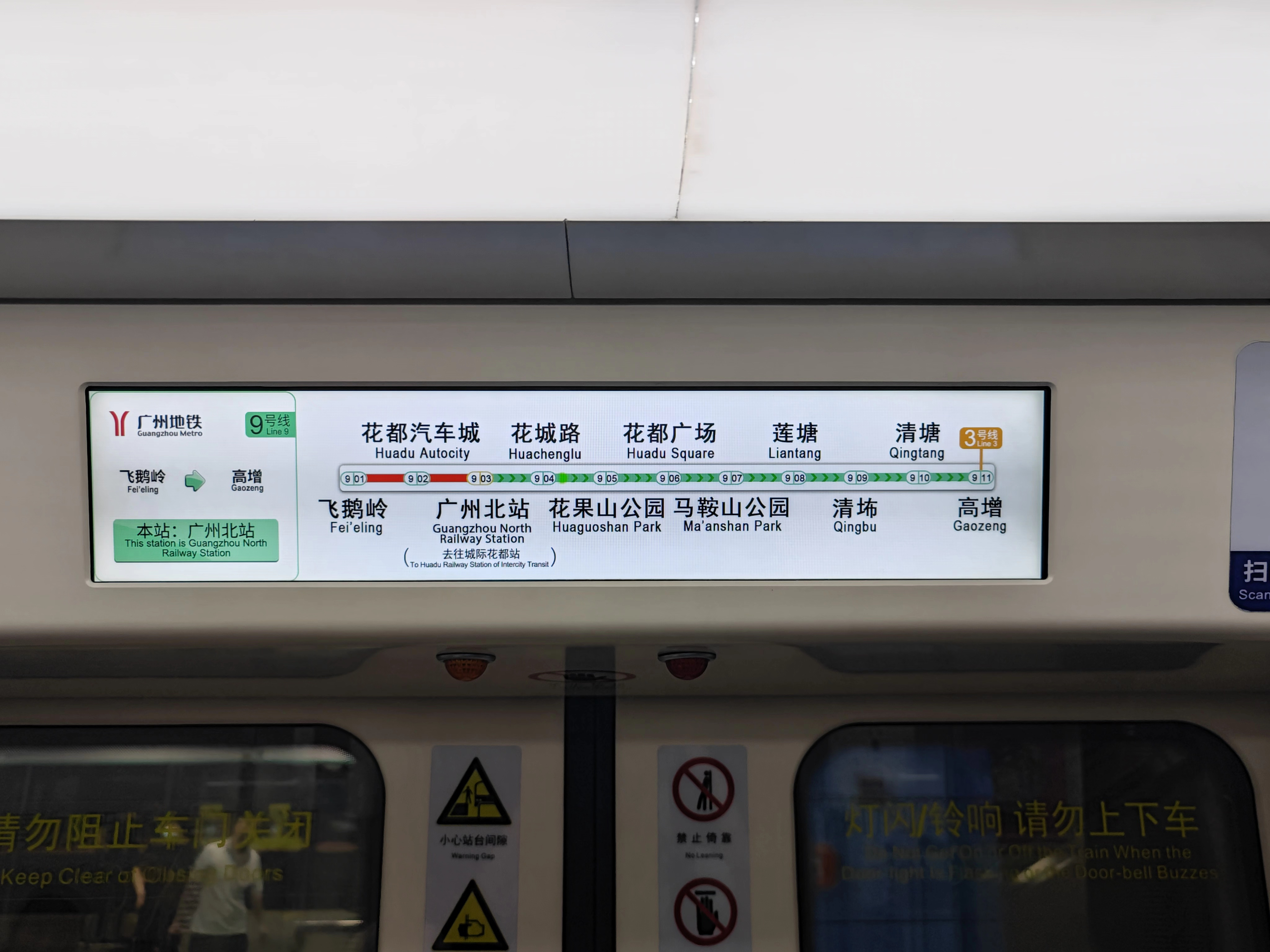
Line 9 train interior LCD

Line 9 of the Guangzhou Metro is a rapid transit line running across the Huadu District. It starts at Fei'eling and ends at Gaozeng. Its only interchange is with Line 3 at Gaozeng. The total length is 20.1 km (12.49 mi) with 11 stations. Line 9's color is pale green. Line 9 was opened for operation on 28 December 2017.

== History ==
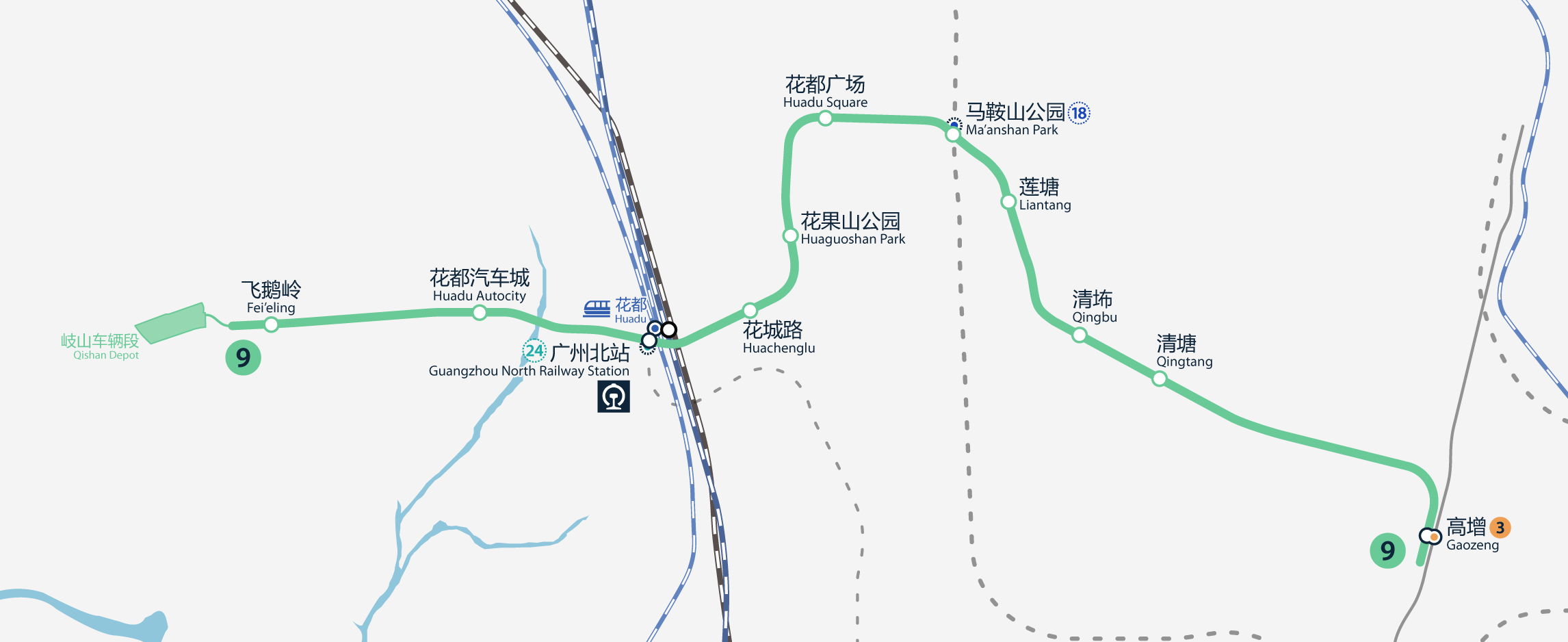
Line 9 drawn to scale.

Line 9 was first announced in July 2009, with an environmental impact report released for public comment. It would start as an elevated line at Fei'eling in Huadu Autocity, before diving down to cross the Tianma River and passing through Guangzhou North Railway Station. It would then climb over the Airport Expressway North Extension before diving down again to meet Line 3 at Gaozeng station, with a total of 8 stations. Works were planned to start in September the same year, with an indicative opening date of December 2012.

In May 2011, the line was approved by the National Development and Reform Commission. By then, the alignment had shifted to entirely underground, with the addition of 2 stations (Huachenglu and Liantang) and one future infill station (Qingtang).

Qingtang station was approved to be built by the local government in August 2015, with a planned completion date in the first half of 2018.

Timetable simulation testing began on 16 November 2017, with the full line except Qingtang opening on 28 December 2017. Qingtang opened on 30 June 2018.

Segment	Commencement	Length	Station(s)	Name
Fei'eling — Gaozeng	28 December 2017	20.1 km (12.49 mi)	10	Phase 1
Qingtang	30 June 2018	Infill station	1	

== Future ==
A 4.8 km (2.98 mi) extension of Line 9 is planned to Forest Park station from Fei'eling station.

== Route ==
The line roughly runs east-west through the Huadu District of Guangzhou. It is fully underground apart from the Qishan Depot.

Station No.	Station name		Connections	Future Connections	Distance km		Location
Station No.	English	Chinese	Connections	Future Connections	Distance km		Location
901	Fei'eling	飞鹅岭			0.00	0.00	Huadu
902	Huadu Autocity	花都汽车城			2.57	2.57	Huadu
903	Guangzhou North Railway Station	广州北站	HAA GQ ER GBQ	24	2.43	5.00	Huadu
904	Huachenglu	花城路			1.00	6.00	Huadu
905	Huaguoshan Park	花果山公园			1.24	7.24	Huadu
906	Huadu Square	花都广场			1.90	9.14	Huadu
907	Ma'anshan Park	马鞍山公园		18	1.60	10.74	Huadu
908	Liantang	莲塘			1.42	12.16	Huadu
909	Qingbu	清㘵			1.53	13.69	Huadu
910	Qingtang	清塘			2.07	15.76	Huadu
911	Gaozeng	高增	3 328		3.45	19.21	Baiyun

== Rolling Stock ==
Line 9 uses 6 car Type B trains.

Eleven trains were ordered for the initial opening and given internal designation B6. They have a top speed of 120km/h and capacity of 1492 passengers (2032 crush load). The first train was manufactured by CRRC Zhuzhou, with the rest manufactured locally by Guangzhou CRRC Rail Transit Equipment. This was the first class of train to use LCD passenger information displays, a standard that has now been adopted across all new rollingstock. The livery features a rippling waistline in the line's colour (pale green) and orange lotus patterns, symbolising respectively the ripples of the Pearl River and Huadu subdistrict, which literally translates as Flower City.
