= Huadu, Guangzhou =

Huadu 花都区 Huaxian
- District
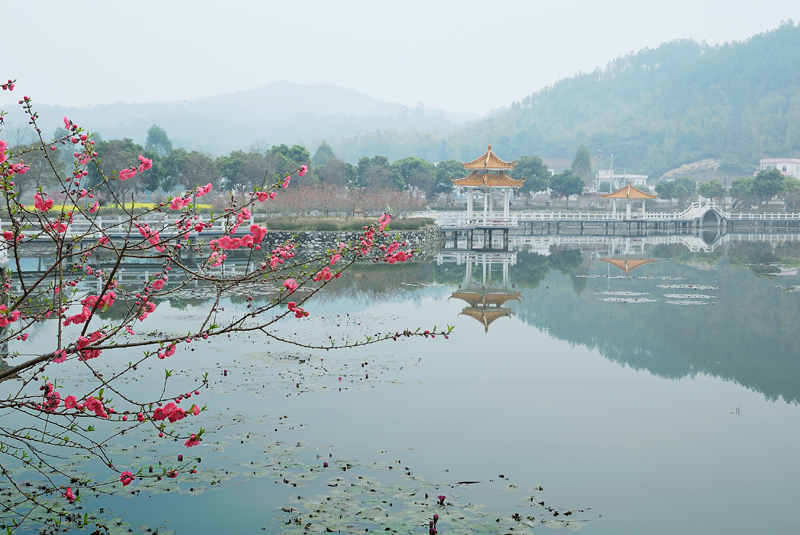
- Hongshan in Huadu District

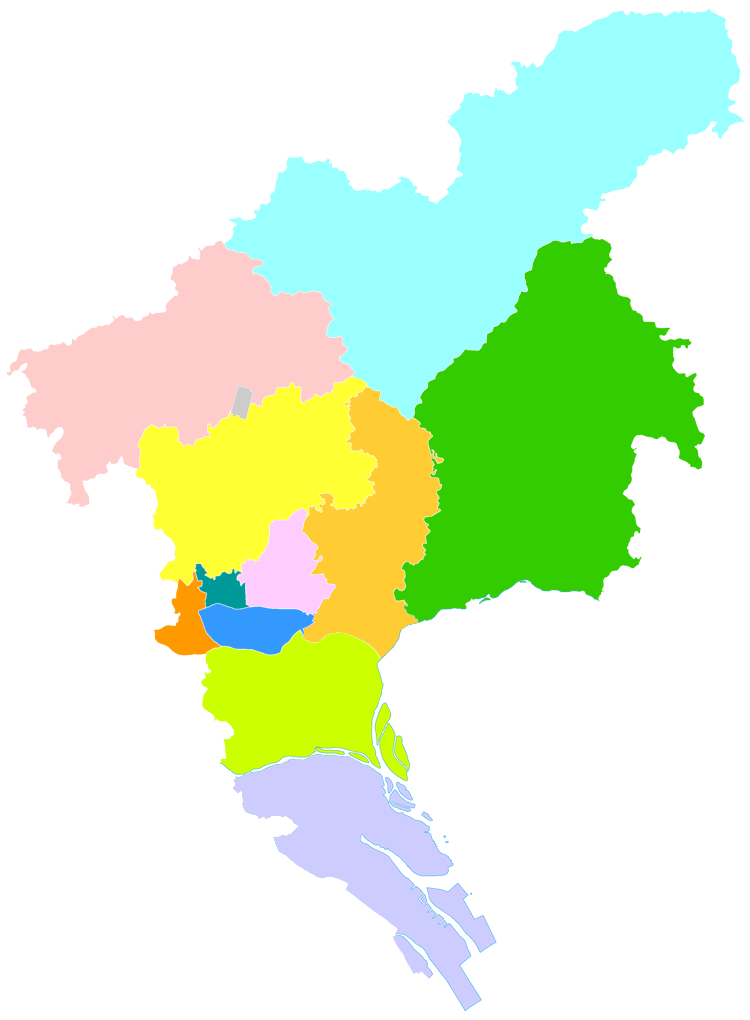
- Huadu District in Guangzhou
- Interactive map of Huadu
- Coordinates: 23°23′N 113°13′E
- Country: People's Republic of China
- Province: Guangdong
- Sub-provincial city: Guangzhou

Area
  - Total: 961 km^{2} (371 sq mi)

Population (2020)
  - Total: 1,642,360
  - Density: 1,710/km^{2} (4,430/sq mi)
- Time zone: UTC+8 (China Standard)
- Postal code: 510800
- Area code: 020
- Website: archived link

Huadu, Guangzhou
- Simplified Chinese: 花都区
- Traditional Chinese: 花都區
- Jyutping: faa1 dou1 keoi1
- Hanyu Pinyin: Huādū Qū
Transcriptions
Standard Mandarin
- Hanyu Pinyin: Huādū Qū
Yue: Cantonese
- Yale Romanization: Fādōu Kēui
- Jyutping: faa1 dou1 keoi1
- Canton Romanization: fa1 dou1 kêu1
- IPA: [fa˥.tɔw˥]

Alternative Chinese name
- Chinese: 花都
- Jyutping: faa1 dou1
- Hanyu Pinyin: Huādū
- Literal meaning: flower capital
Transcriptions
Standard Mandarin
- Hanyu Pinyin: Huādū
Yue: Cantonese
- Yale Romanization: Fādōu
- Jyutping: faa1 dou1
- Canton Romanization: fa1 dou1

Second alternative Chinese name
- Simplified Chinese: 花县
- Traditional Chinese: 花縣
- Jyutping: faa1 jyun2
- Hanyu Pinyin: Huāxiàn
Transcriptions
Standard Mandarin
- Hanyu Pinyin: Huāxiàn
Yue: Cantonese
- Yale Romanization: Fāyún
- Jyutping: faa1 jyun2
- Canton Romanization: fa1 yun2

Huadu District is one of 11 urban districts of the prefecture-level city of Guangzhou, the capital of Guangdong, China. It is located in the far northern suburbs of the city.

Xinhua Town is the seat of local government, and of the district CCP committee.

While the Cantonese dialect is universally spoken, about 1/3 of the population consists of Hakka dialect speaking peoples. The district is the ancestral home of many Overseas Chinese.

Formerly known as Hua County, it was the hometown of many Taiping Rebellion leaders like Hong Xiuquan and Hong Rengan.

== History ==
The district was established in the Qing dynasty (1644–1911) as a county, Hua County or Huaxian (Chinese: 花县; pinyin: Huāxiàn; Cantonese Yale: Fāyún, also known as Fahsien), which was located north of the then city limits of Guangzhou. It remained a county until 1993, when it was recognized as a city and renamed as Huadu (Chinese: 花都; pinyin: Huādū; Cantonese Yale: Fādōu). In 2000, it became an attached northern suburban district of the expanded municipality of Guangzhou.

Natives of Huadu speak a dialect of Yue Chinese called Huaxian (Chinese: 花县话; Cantonese Yale: Fāyún wá or Fahsien). In addition to its population, Huadu is the hometown of approximately 300,000 overseas Chinese, including a large number in the Republic of Panama, and some in Hong Kong and Macao.

Guangzhou Baiyun International Airport, Guangzhou's main airport, is located in the district, as is Guangzhou North Railway Station on the Wuhan–Guangzhou High-Speed Railway.

== Resources ==
Huadu District is rich in natural resources. With a rich rainfall, Huadu is abundant in a variety of crops, vegetables, tea, litchis, bananas, longans, peanuts and sugarcane.

Jingtang Lotus Roots are thought to originate here in Jingtang Town.

The mines proved up are up to 18 varieties among which the largely-reserved and high-rank limestone, kaolin, clay and granite etc. have a bright future of mining. The district also is rich in water. The annual flux of the surface water on average for years is 1.15 billion cubic meters. There are 17 reservoirs of medium and small size in the district. The Liuxi River and Bajiang River are across the district.

== Administrative divisions ==
There are currently 4 subdistricts and 6 towns.

On 2 December 2013 three new subdistricts (Huacheng, Xiuquan, and Xinya) were established from carving out Xinhua Subdistrict, while upgrading Yayao Town into a subdistrict.

Name	Chinese (S)	Hanyu Pinyin	Canton Romanization	Population (2010)	Area (km^{2})
Xinhua Subdistrict	新华街道	Xīnhuá Jiēdào	san1 waa4 gaai1 dou6	381,311	29.81
Huacheng Subdistrict	花城街道	Huāchéng Jiēdào	faa1 seng4 gaai1 dou6	381,311	26.56
Xinya Subdistrict	新雅街道	Xīnyǎ Jiēdào	san1 ngaa5 gaai1 dou6	20,520	32.98
Xiuquan Subdistrict	秀全街道	Xiùquán Jiēdào	sau3 cyun4 gaai1 dou6	20,520	54.19
Timian town	梯面镇	Tīmiàn Zhèn	tai1 min6 zan3	9,516	91.20
Huashan town	花山镇	Huāshān Zhèn	faa1 saan1 zan3	99,262	116.40
Tanbu town	炭步镇	Tànbù Zhèn	taan3 bou6 zen3	55,797	113.33
Chini town	赤坭镇	Chìní Zhèn	cek3 nai4 zen3	56,609	160.03
Shiling town	狮岭镇	Shīlǐng Zhèn	si1 leng5 zan3	203,254	136.31
Huadong town	花东镇	Huādōng Zhèn	faa1 dung1 zan3	118,736	208.44

== Climate ==
Climate data for Huadu, elevation 39 m (128 ft), (1991–2020 normals, extremes 1958–present)
Month	Jan	Feb	Mar	Apr	May	Jun	Jul	Aug	Sep	Oct	Nov	Dec	Year
Record high °C (°F)	28.6 (83.5)	29.6 (85.3)	33.1 (91.6)	34.8 (94.6)	35.2 (95.4)	38.5 (101.3)	39.6 (103.3)	37.9 (100.2)	38.0 (100.4)	36.3 (97.3)	33.6 (92.5)	30.0 (86.0)	39.6 (103.3)
Mean daily maximum °C (°F)	18.4 (65.1)	19.7 (67.5)	22.1 (71.8)	26.4 (79.5)	30.2 (86.4)	32.3 (90.1)	33.7 (92.7)	33.7 (92.7)	32.4 (90.3)	29.6 (85.3)	25.5 (77.9)	20.6 (69.1)	27.1 (80.7)
Daily mean °C (°F)	13.8 (56.8)	15.6 (60.1)	18.3 (64.9)	22.7 (72.9)	26.2 (79.2)	28.1 (82.6)	29.3 (84.7)	29.2 (84.6)	27.9 (82.2)	24.9 (76.8)	20.5 (68.9)	15.6 (60.1)	22.7 (72.8)
Mean daily minimum °C (°F)	10.8 (51.4)	12.7 (54.9)	15.5 (59.9)	19.9 (67.8)	23.3 (73.9)	25.4 (77.7)	26.2 (79.2)	26.1 (79.0)	24.7 (76.5)	21.5 (70.7)	17.0 (62.6)	12.2 (54.0)	19.6 (67.3)
Record low °C (°F)	0.4 (32.7)	2.3 (36.1)	2.7 (36.9)	9.0 (48.2)	14.6 (58.3)	18.6 (65.5)	21.6 (70.9)	21.9 (71.4)	15.7 (60.3)	10.3 (50.5)	4.5 (40.1)	0.7 (33.3)	0.4 (32.7)
Average precipitation mm (inches)	51.9 (2.04)	51.0 (2.01)	117.1 (4.61)	206.6 (8.13)	307.7 (12.11)	366.1 (14.41)	233.5 (9.19)	236.7 (9.32)	173.3 (6.82)	70.5 (2.78)	37.0 (1.46)	37.9 (1.49)	1,889.3 (74.37)
Average precipitation days (≥ 0.1 mm)	7.9	10.1	15.3	15.8	18.0	20.0	17.4	16.2	11.7	5.3	5.8	5.8	149.3
Average relative humidity (%)	69	74	79	80	80	82	79	78	74	66	66	64	74
Mean monthly sunshine hours	119.6	88.8	68.0	82.0	127.8	149.8	211.1	201.9	197.1	206.3	177.5	165.5	1,795.4
Percentage possible sunshine	36	28	18	21	31	37	51	51	54	58	54	50	41
Source: China Meteorological Administrationall-time record extremes

== Transportation ==
=== Metro ===
Huadu is currently service by two metro line operated by Guangzhou Metro:

- Line 3 – Airport North, Airport South
- Line 9 – Fei'eling, Huadu Auto City, Guangzhou North Station, Huacheng Lu, Huaguoshan Park, Huadu Square, Ma'anshan Park, Liantang, Qingbu, Qingtang

== People ==
- March Fong Eu, ancestry
- Hong Xiuquan (Fuyuan Springs)

== Sister cities ==
- Markham, Canada, since November/December 2012
- Petrer, Spain, since November 2020
