= Guangzhou North railway station =

Railway station in Guangdong, China

Coordinates: 23°22′47″N 113°11′57″E

Guangzhoubei 广州北
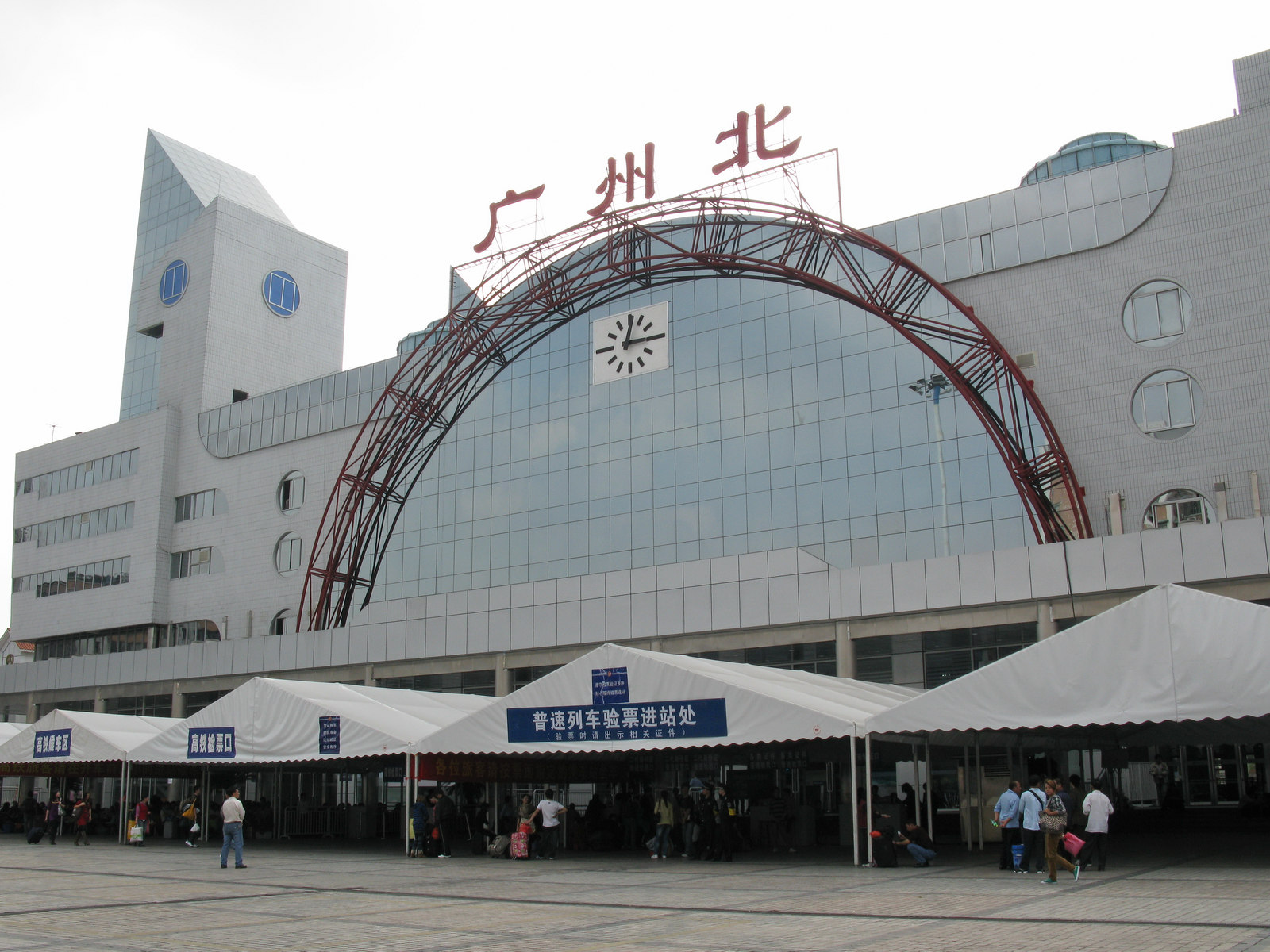
- Exterior

General information
- Location: Zhanqian Road (站前路); Xinhua Subdistrict, Huadu District, Guangzhou, Guangdong; China
- Operated by: China Railway Guangzhou Group
- Line(s): Beijing–Guangzhou railway; Wuhan–Guangzhou high-speed railway; Guangzhou–Shitan railway; Guangzhou–Heyuan high-speed railway (planned); Second Guangzhou–Shenzhen high-speed railway (planned)

Construction
- Structure type: At-grade
- Accessible: Yes

Other information
- Station code: China Railway: TMIS code: 23483; Telegraph code: GBQ; Pinyin code: GZB
- Classification: 2nd class station

History
- Opened: 1908 (conventional speed railway); 2009 (high-speed railway)

Services
Preceding station	China Railway	Following station
Juntian towards Beijing West	Beijing–Guangzhou railway	Guangzhou Baiyun towards Guangzhou
Preceding station	China Railway High-speed	Following station
Qingyuan towards Wuhan	Wuhan–Guangzhou high-speed railway	Guangzhou South Terminus

Guangzhou North railway station (simplified Chinese: 广州北站; traditional Chinese: 廣州北站; pinyin: Guǎngzhōuběi Zhàn; Jyutping: gwong^{2} zau^{1} bak^{1} zaam^{6}) is a railway station in Huadu District in northern Guangzhou, Guangdong Province, China, opened in 1908.

The station is served both by the high-speed trains of the Wuhan–Guangzhou high-speed railway and by regular passenger trains on the original Beijing–Guangzhou railway running along the same route.

== Metro station ==
It is served by Line 9 of the Guangzhou Metro.

== See also ==
- Huadu railway station, a railway station next to Guangzhou North
- Guangzhou South railway station, 17 km from central Guangzhou, now receives most high speed trains to and from the city, and its opening diminished the importance of the somewhat remote Guangzhou North railway station. Most services that stop at Guangzhou North also stop at Guangzhou South.
