= Gaozeng station =

Guangzhou Metro interchange station

Coordinates: 23.355162°N 113.295504°E

Gaozeng 高增
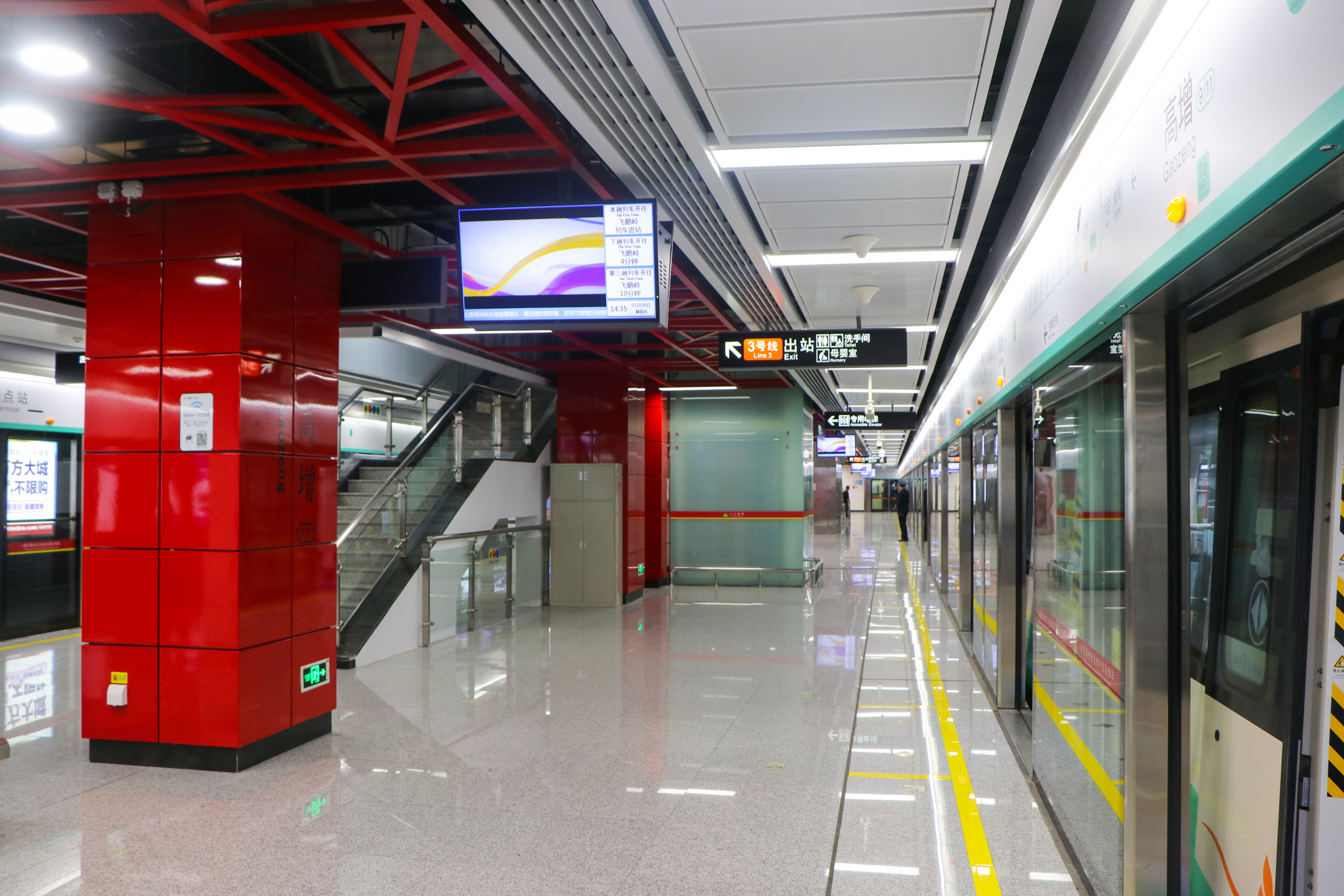
- Line 9 platform

Chinese name
- Chinese: 高增站
Transcriptions
Standard Mandarin
- Hanyu Pinyin: Gāozēng Zhàn
Yue: Cantonese
- Yale Romanization: Gōujāng Jaahm
- Jyutping: Gou^{1}zang^{1} Zaam^{6}
- Hong Kong Romanization: Ko Tsang station

General information
- Location: Baiyun District, Guangzhou, Guangdong; China
- Operator: Guangzhou Metro Co. Ltd.
- Lines: Line 3; Line 9
- Platforms: 4 (2 island platforms)
- Tracks: 4

Construction
- Structure type: Underground
- Accessible: Yes

Other information
- Station code: 328 911

History
- Opened: 28 December 2017; 8 years ago

Services
Preceding station	Guangzhou Metro	Following station
Renhe towards Haibang	Line 3	Airport North (Terminal 2) Terminus
Qingtang towards Fei'eling	Line 9	Terminus
Location

Gaozeng station (Chinese: 高增站; Cantonese Yale: Gōujāng Jaahm), formerly Aigang station (矮岗站; Áigōng Jaahm) during planning, is an interchange station between Line 3 and Line 9 of the Guangzhou Metro, and also the eastern terminus of Line 9. The underground station is located at the south of Guangzhou Baiyun International Airport in Baiyun District. The station opened for both lines when Line 9 went into operation on 28 December 2017.

== Station layout ==
G Concourse	Lobby	Ticket Machines, Customer Service, Shops, Police Station, Safety Facilities, Toilets, Baby Change, Exits A-D
B1; Concourse	Transfer Lobby	Transfer lobby between Lines 3 & 9
B2; Platforms	Platform 3	9 termination platform
B2; Platforms	Island platform, doors will open on the left
B2; Platforms	Platform 4	9 towards Fei'eling (Qingtang)
B2; Platforms	Platform 1	3 towards Haibang (Renhe)
B2; Platforms	Island platform, doors will open on the left
B2; Platforms	Platform 2	3 towards Airport North (Terminus)

== Exits ==
Exit number	Exit location
Exit A	Fanghua Lu
Exit B	Fanghua Lu
Exit C	Fanghua Lu
Exit D	Fanghua Lu

== Gallery ==
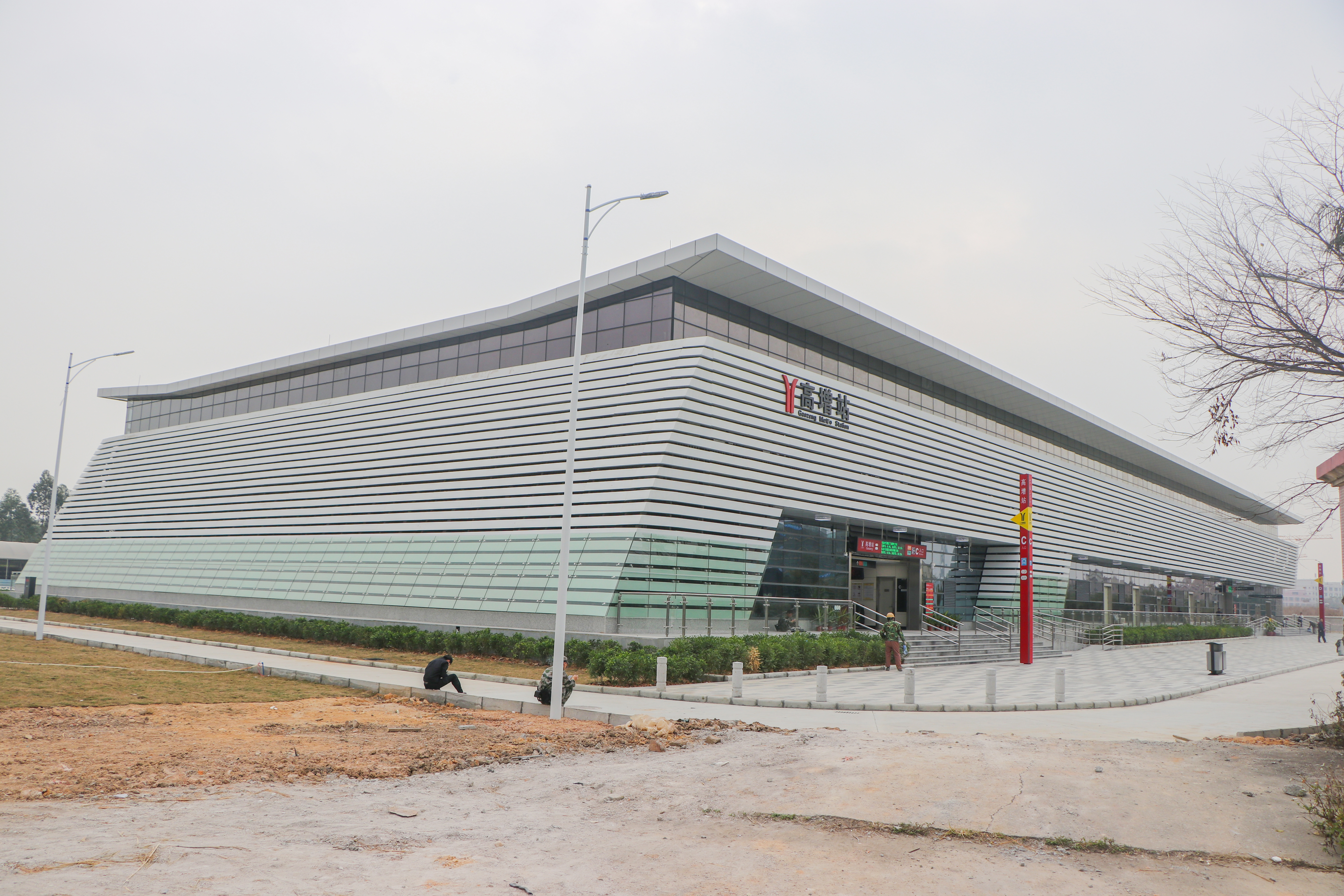
Exterior

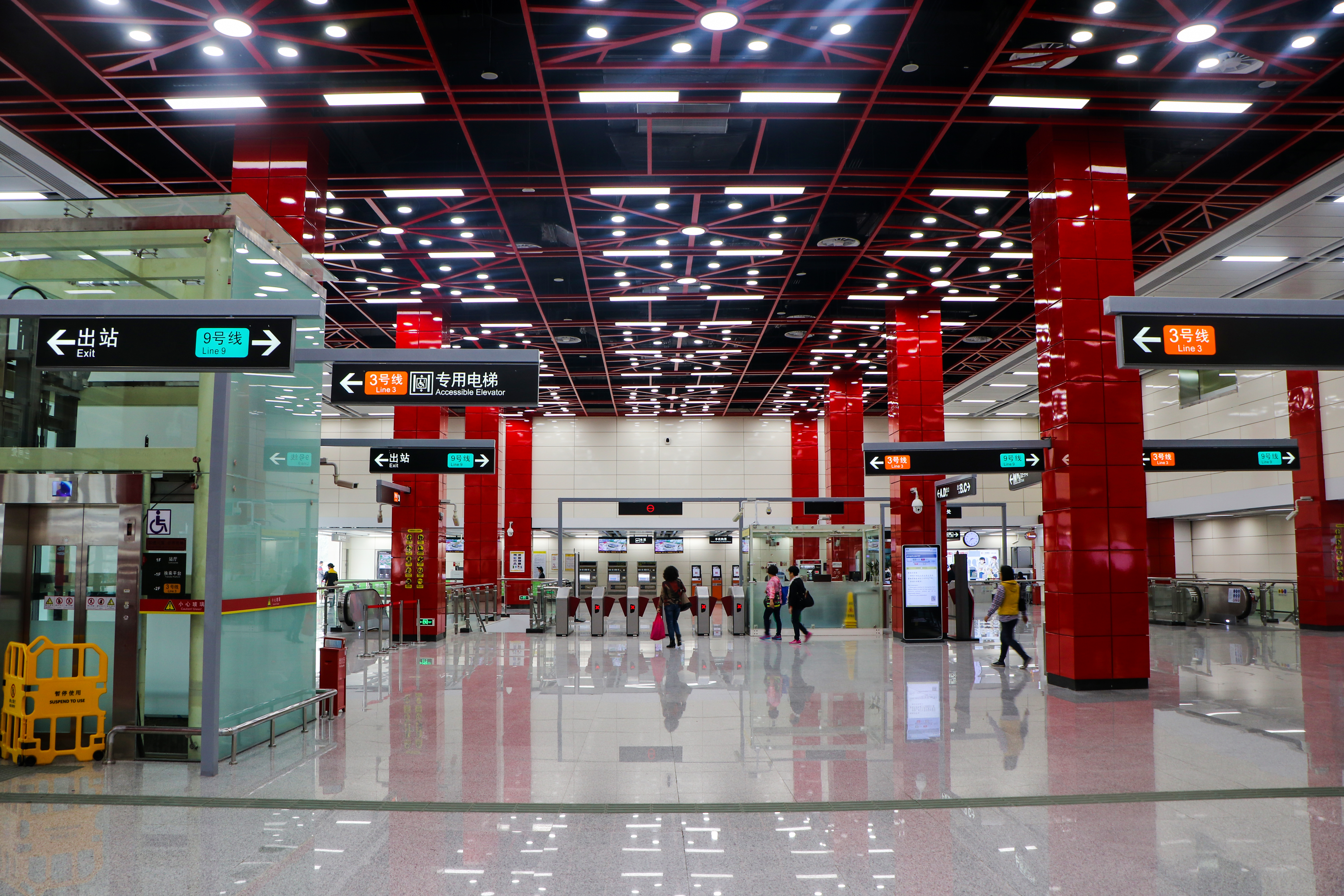
Concourse

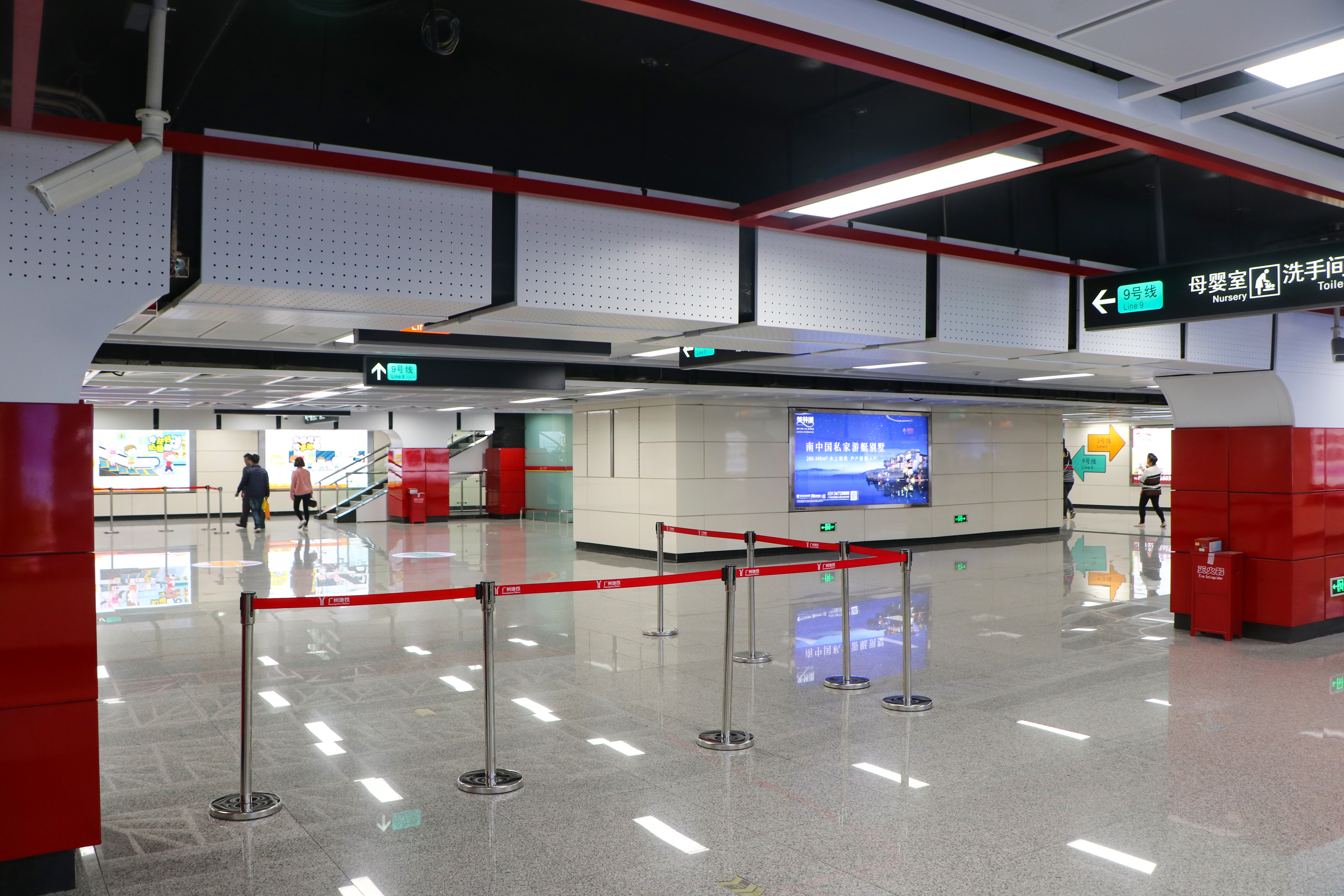
Transfer level

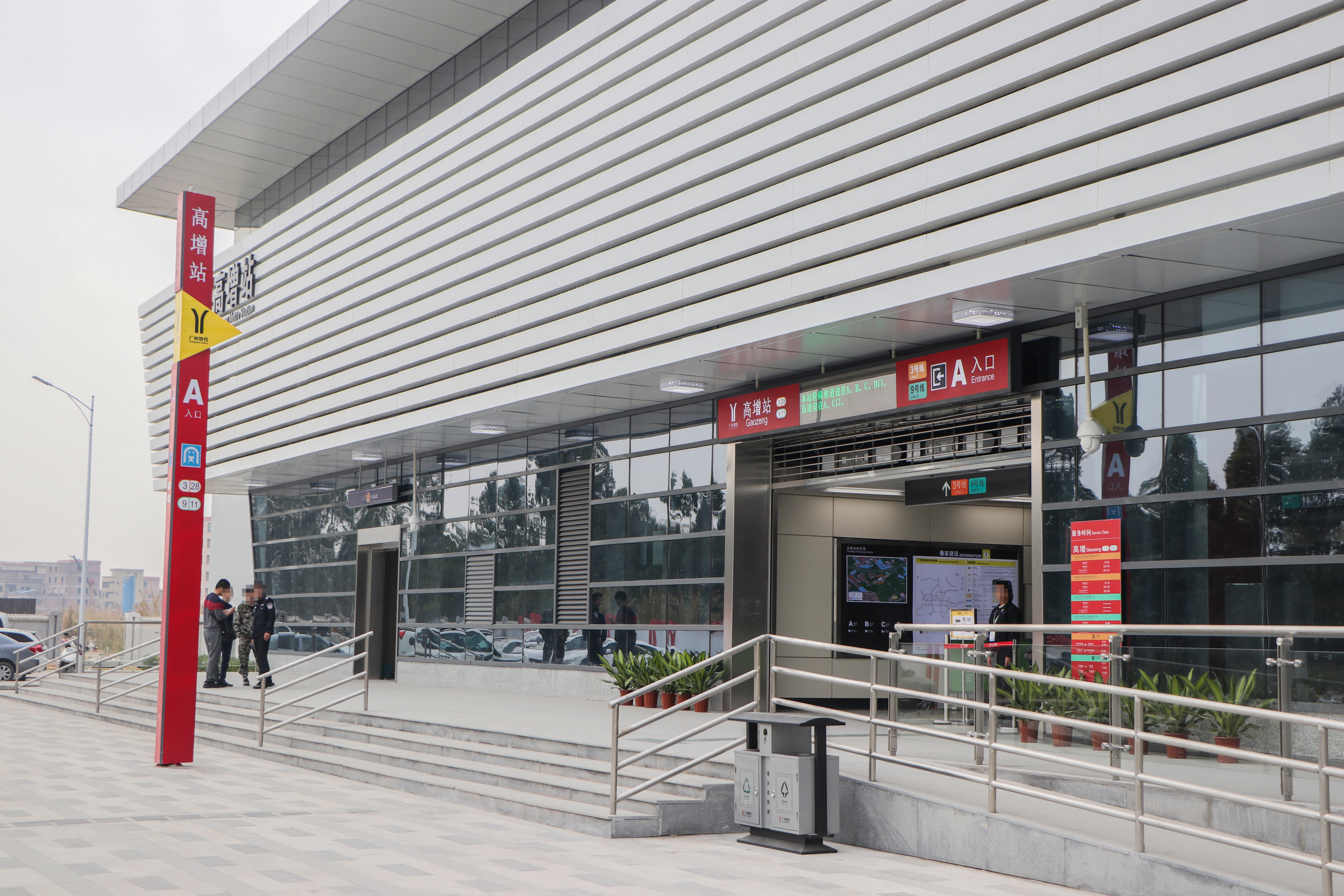
Exit A

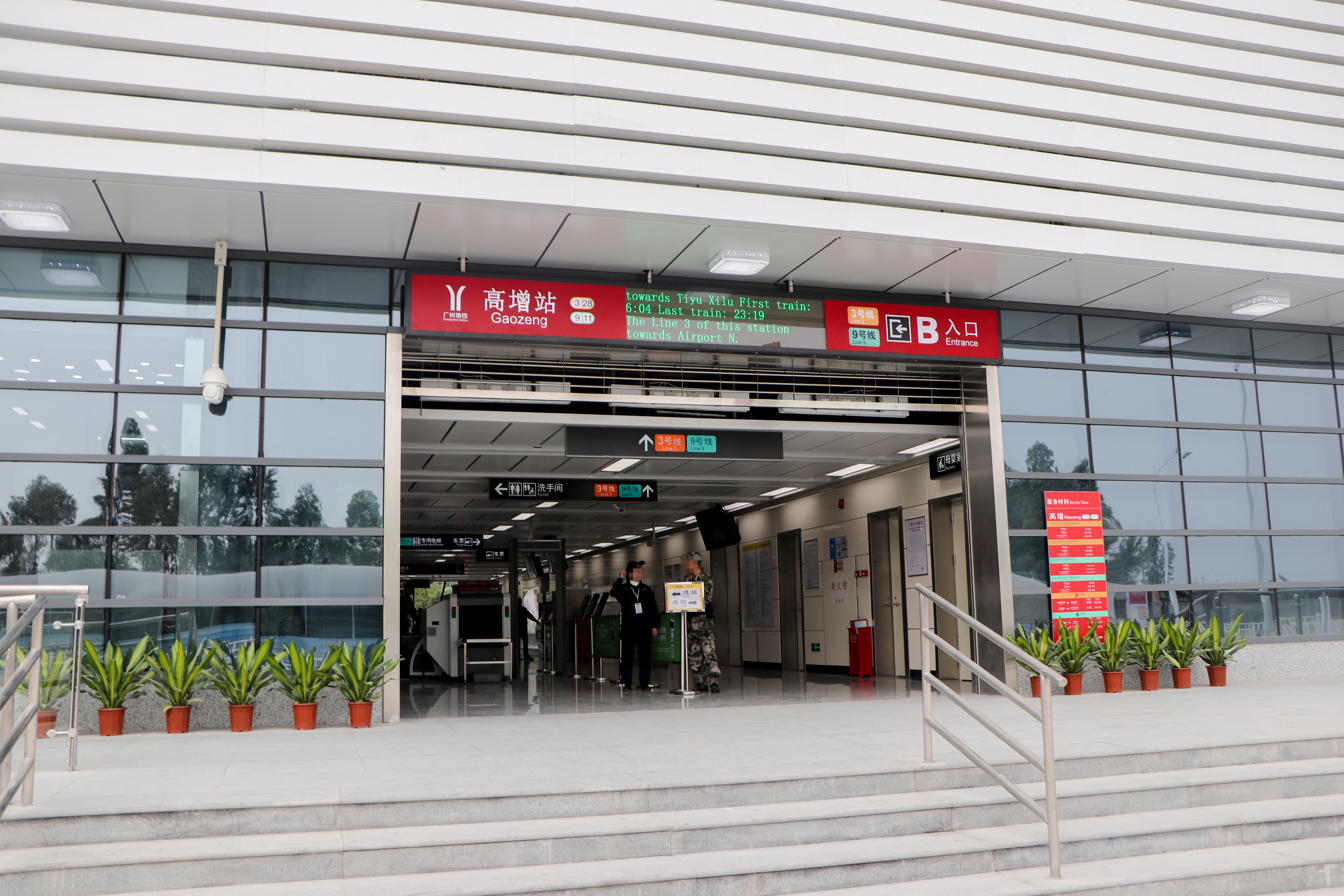
Exit B

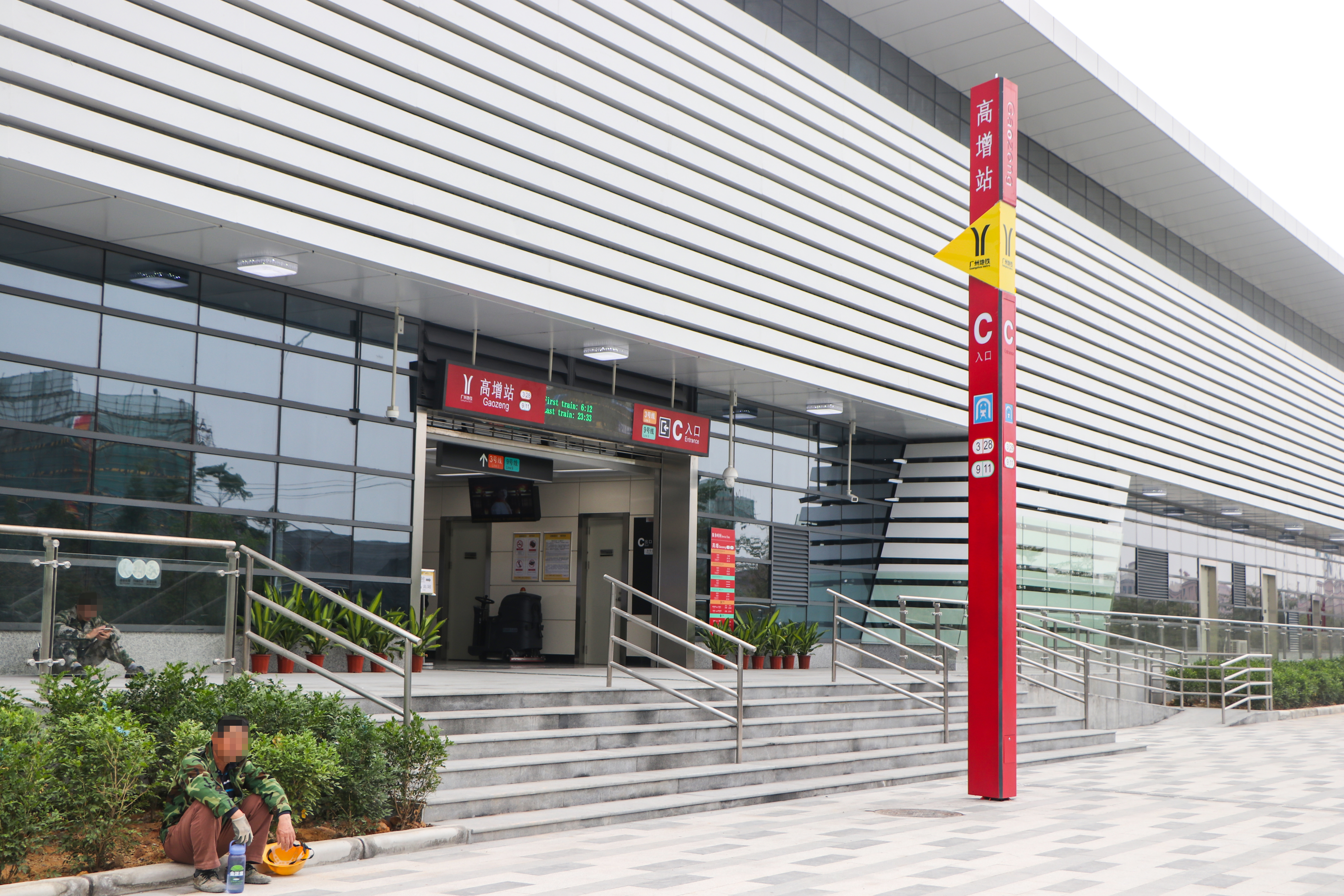
Exit C

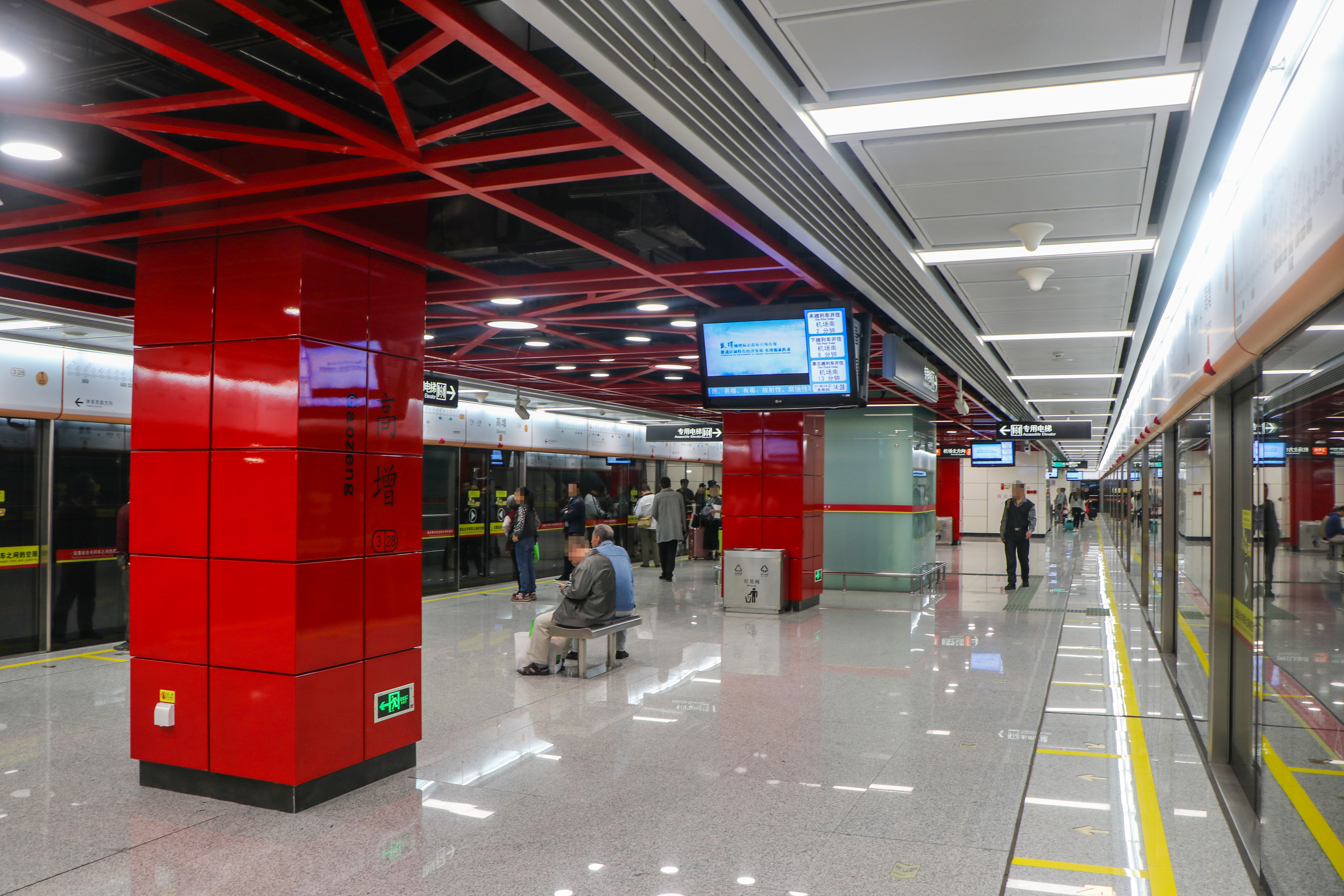
Line 3 platform
