= Fei'eling station =

Station of the Guangzhou Metro in China

Coordinates: 23°22′42″N 113°09′18″E

Fei'eling 飞鹅岭
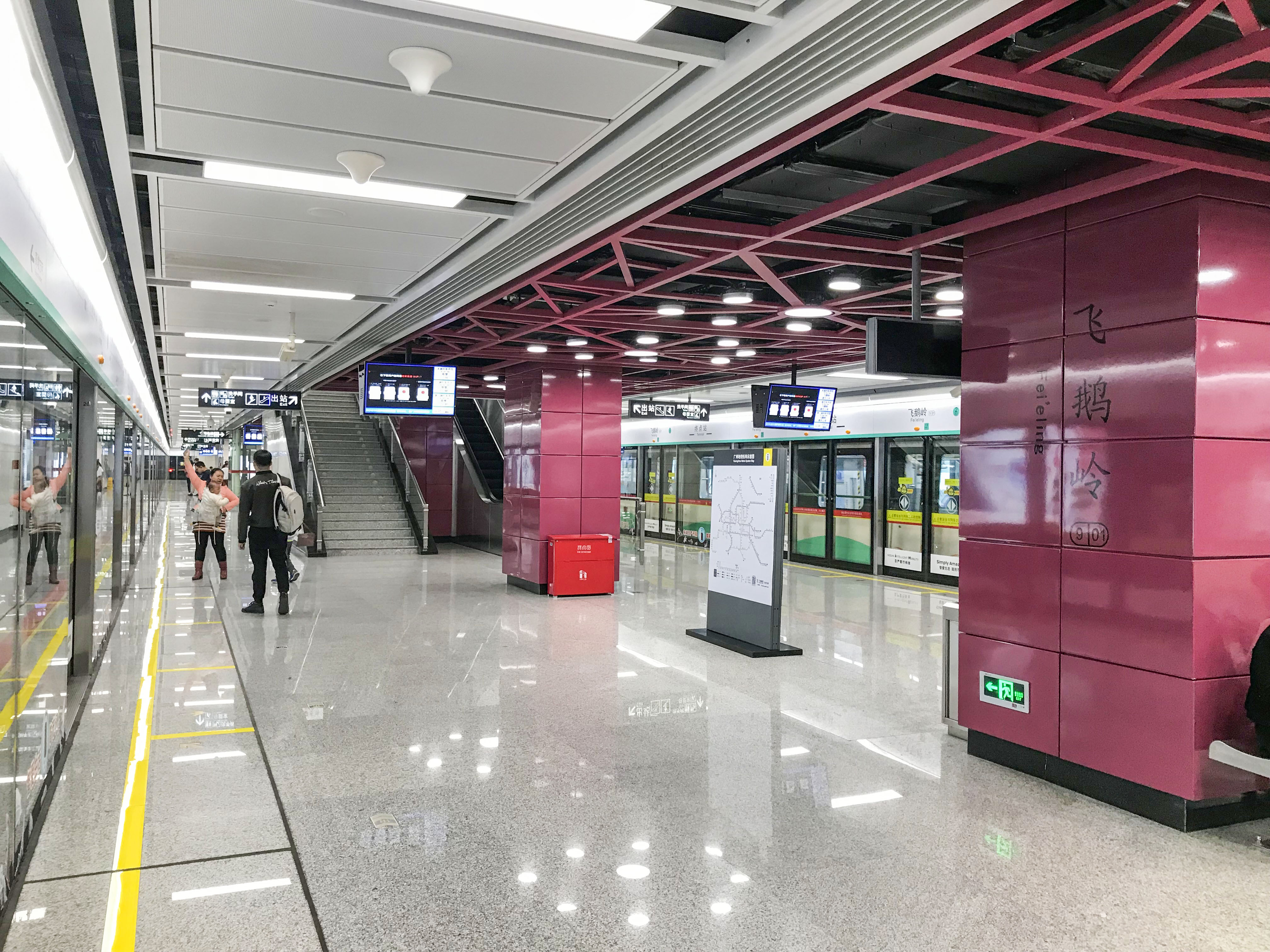
- Platform of Fei'eling

Chinese name
- Simplified Chinese: 飞鹅岭站
- Traditional Chinese: 飛鵝嶺站
- Literal meaning: flying goose mountain
Transcriptions
Standard Mandarin
- Hanyu Pinyin: Fēi'élǐng Zhàn
Yue: Cantonese
- Jyutping: fei^{1}ngo^{4}leng^{5} zaam^{6}

General information
- Location: Fengshen Avenue (风神大道); Huadu District, Guangzhou, Guangdong; China
- Operator: Guangzhou Metro Co. Ltd.
- Line: Line 9

Other information
- Station code: 901

History
- Opened: 28 December 2017; 8 years ago

Services
Preceding station	Guangzhou Metro	Following station
Terminus	Line 9	Huadu Autocity towards Gaozeng
Location

Fei'eling station (Chinese: 飞鹅岭站) is a station of and the current western terminus of Line 9 of the Guangzhou Metro, located in Huadu District. It started operations on 28 December 2017, and is the westernmost Guangzhou Metro station that lies within the sub-provincial administrative area of Guangzhou.

== Station layout ==
G	-	Exits
L1; Concourse	Lobby	Customer Service, Shops, Vending machines, ATMs
L2; Platforms	Platform 1	9 towards Gaozeng (Huadu Autocity)
L2; Platforms	Island platform, doors will open on the left
L2; Platforms	Platform 2	9 termination platform

== Exits ==
Exit number	Exit location
Exit A	Fengshen Dadao
Exit B	Fengshen Dadao
Exit C	Fengshen Dadao
Exit D	Fengshen Dadao
