= Longdong station =

Longdong station may refer to:

- Longdong station (Guangzhou Metro), a station of Guangzhou Metro
- Longdong station (Jinan Metro), a station of Jinan Metro
- Longdong station (Shenzhen Metro), a station of Shenzhen Metro
- Longdong railway station, a station of Pearl River Delta Intercity Railway
