= Longdong railway station =

Guangdong Intercity railway station in Guangzhou, China

Longdong 龙洞
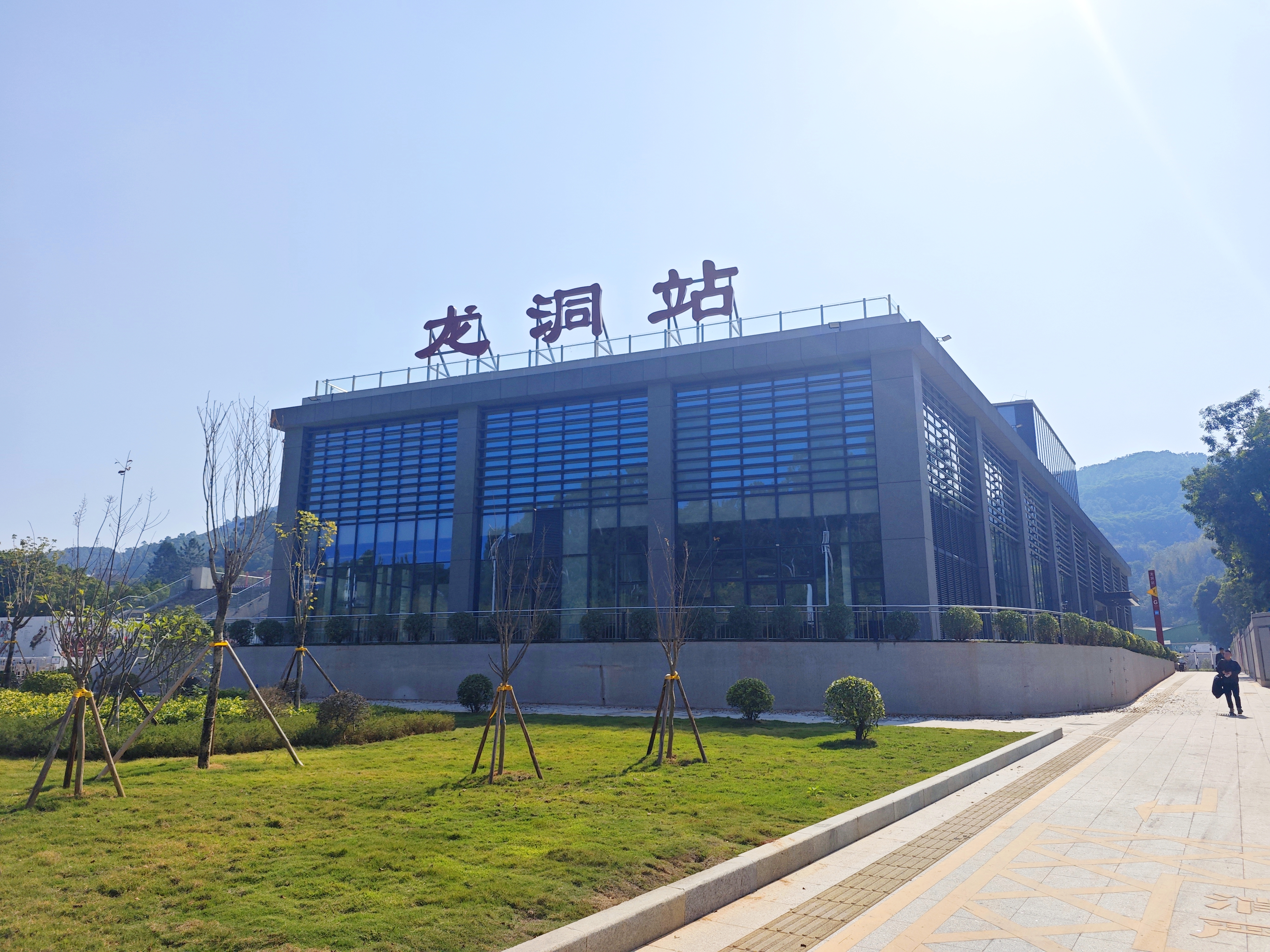
- Exterior

Chinese name
- Simplified Chinese: 龙洞站
- Traditional Chinese: 龍洞站
Transcriptions
Standard Mandarin
- Hanyu Pinyin: Lóngdòng Zhàn
Yue: Cantonese
- Yale Romanization: Lùhngduhng Jaahm
- Jyutping: Lung^{4}dung^{6} Zaam^{6}

General information
- Location: Guangshan 1st Road (广汕一路); Longdong Subdistrict, Tianhe District, Guangzhou, Guangdong; China
- Coordinates: 23°11′31.42″N 113°22′31.48″E
- Owner: Pearl River Delta Metropolitan Region intercity railway
- Operator: Guangdong Intercity
- Line: Guangzhou East Ring intercity railway
- Platforms: 2 (1 island platform)
- Tracks: 2
- Connections: 6 Longdong

Construction
- Structure type: Underground
- Accessible: Yes

Other information
- Station code: UGQ (Pinyin: LDO)

History
- Opened: 29 September 2025 (10 months ago)

Services
Preceding station	Pearl River Delta Metropolitan Region Intercity Railway	Following station
Dayuan towards Huadu	Guangzhou East Ring intercity railway	Cencun towards Panyu
Transfer at Longdong
Preceding station	Guangzhou Metro	Following station
Botanical Garden towards Xunfenggang	Line 6 transfer at Longdong	Kemulang towards Xiangxue
Location

Longdong railway station (Chinese: 龙洞站; pinyin: Lóngdòng Zhàn; Cantonese Yale: Lùhngduhng Jaahm) is an underground railway station on Guangzhou East Ring intercity railway located in Tianhe District, Guangzhou, Guangdong, China. It opened on 29 September 2025.

== Features ==
The station has an underground island platform. It also has a cooling tower.

=== Entrances/exits ===
The station has 4 points of entry/exit. As this station is connected to the metro station, the entrances/exits of the intercity stations are lettered from E to distinguish from the entrances/exits of the metro station, which are lettered A-D. All exits have accessible ramps.

- ~~E~~: (Not open)
- F: Guangshan 1st Road
- G: Guangshan 1st Road, 6 Longdong
- ~~H~~: (Not open)
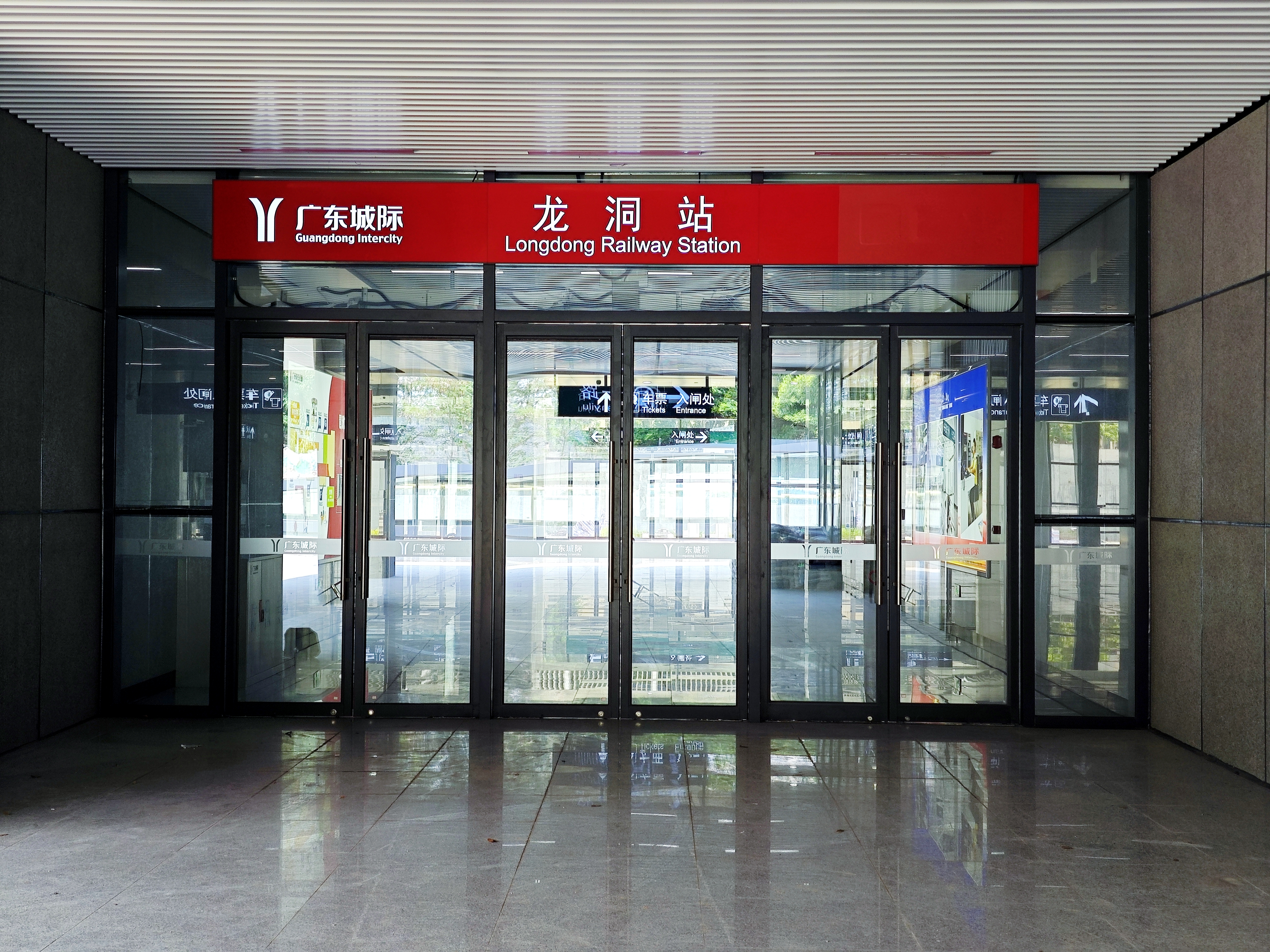
Entrance E (not open)

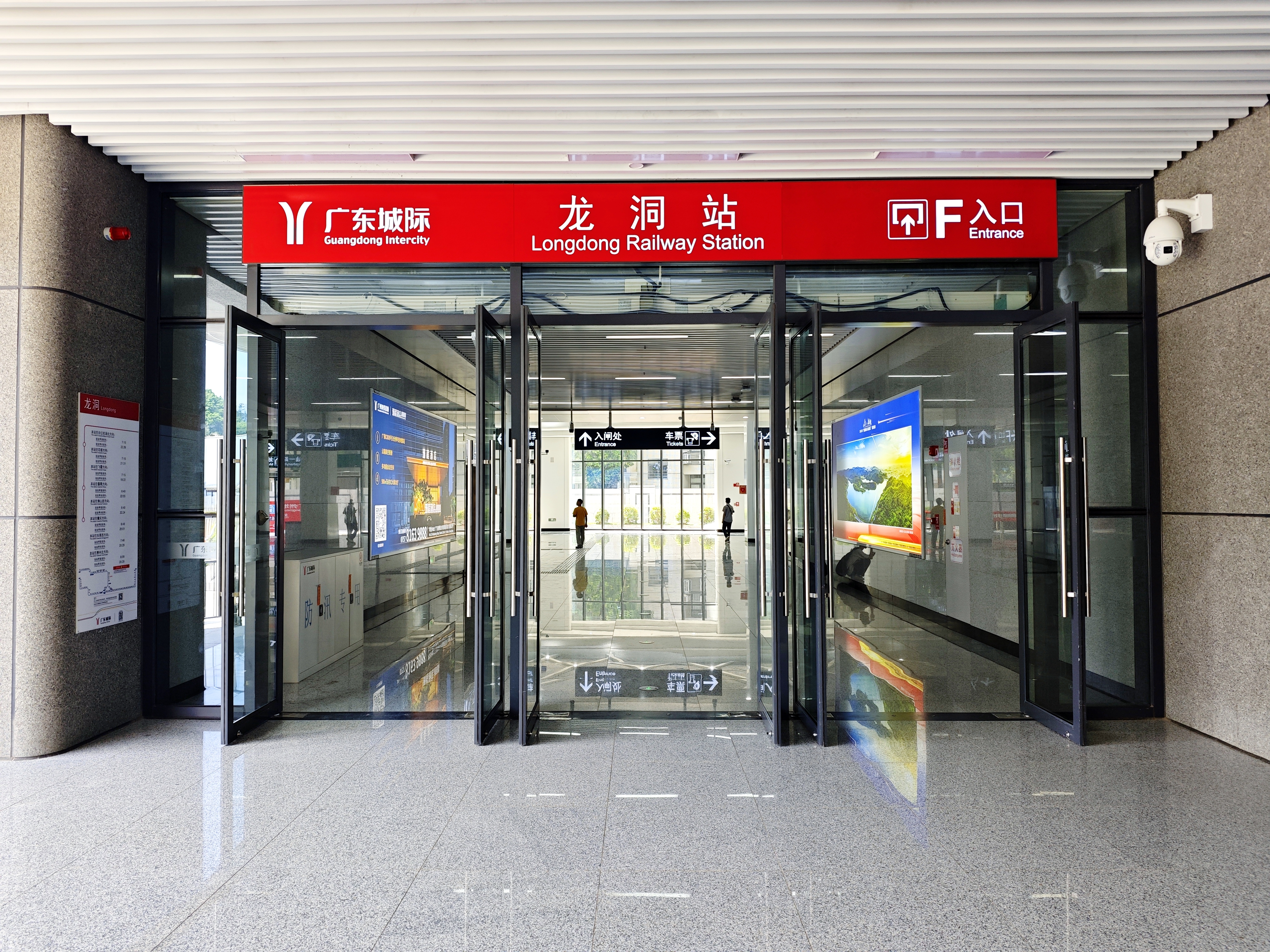
Entrance F

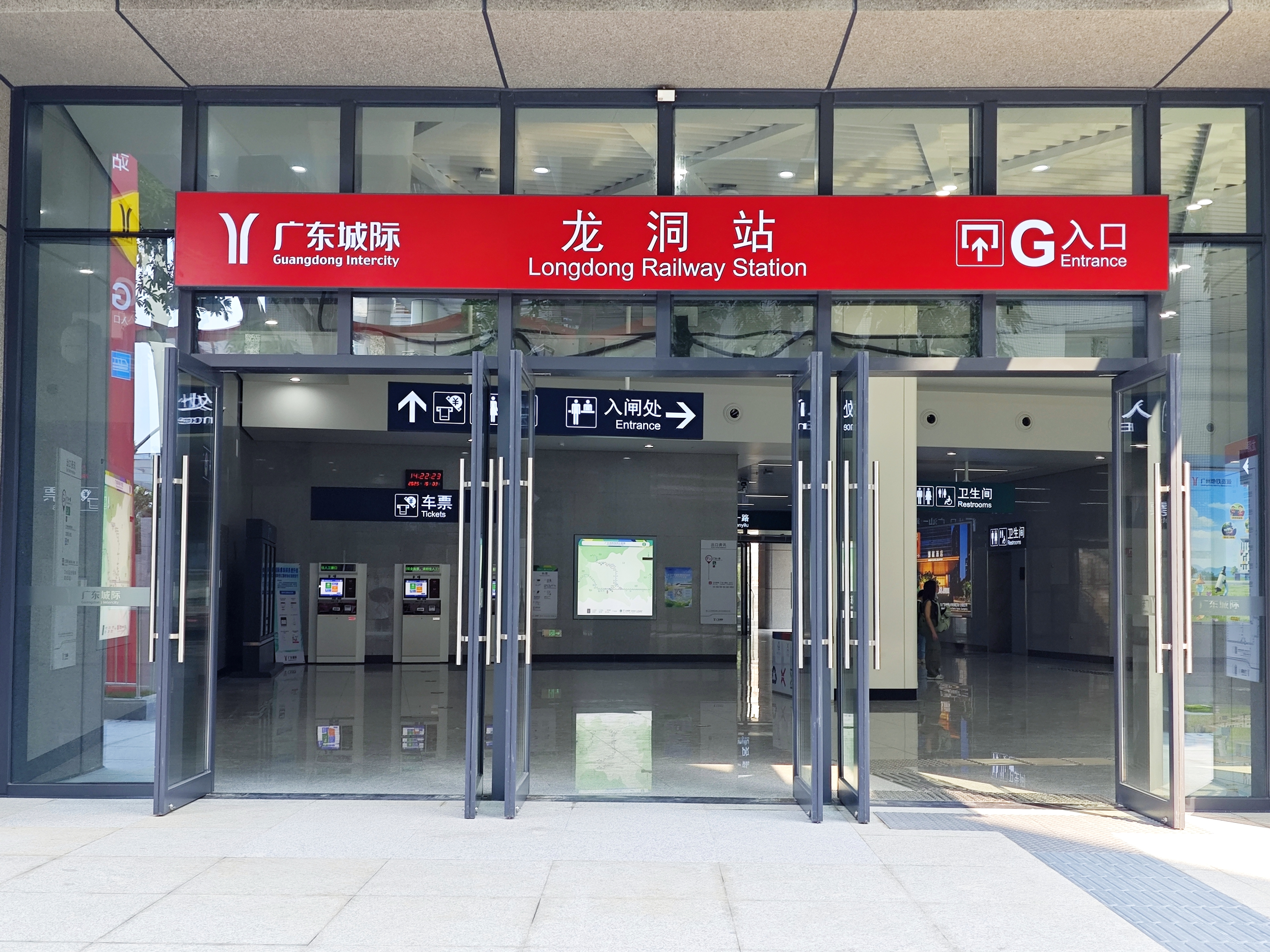
Entrance G

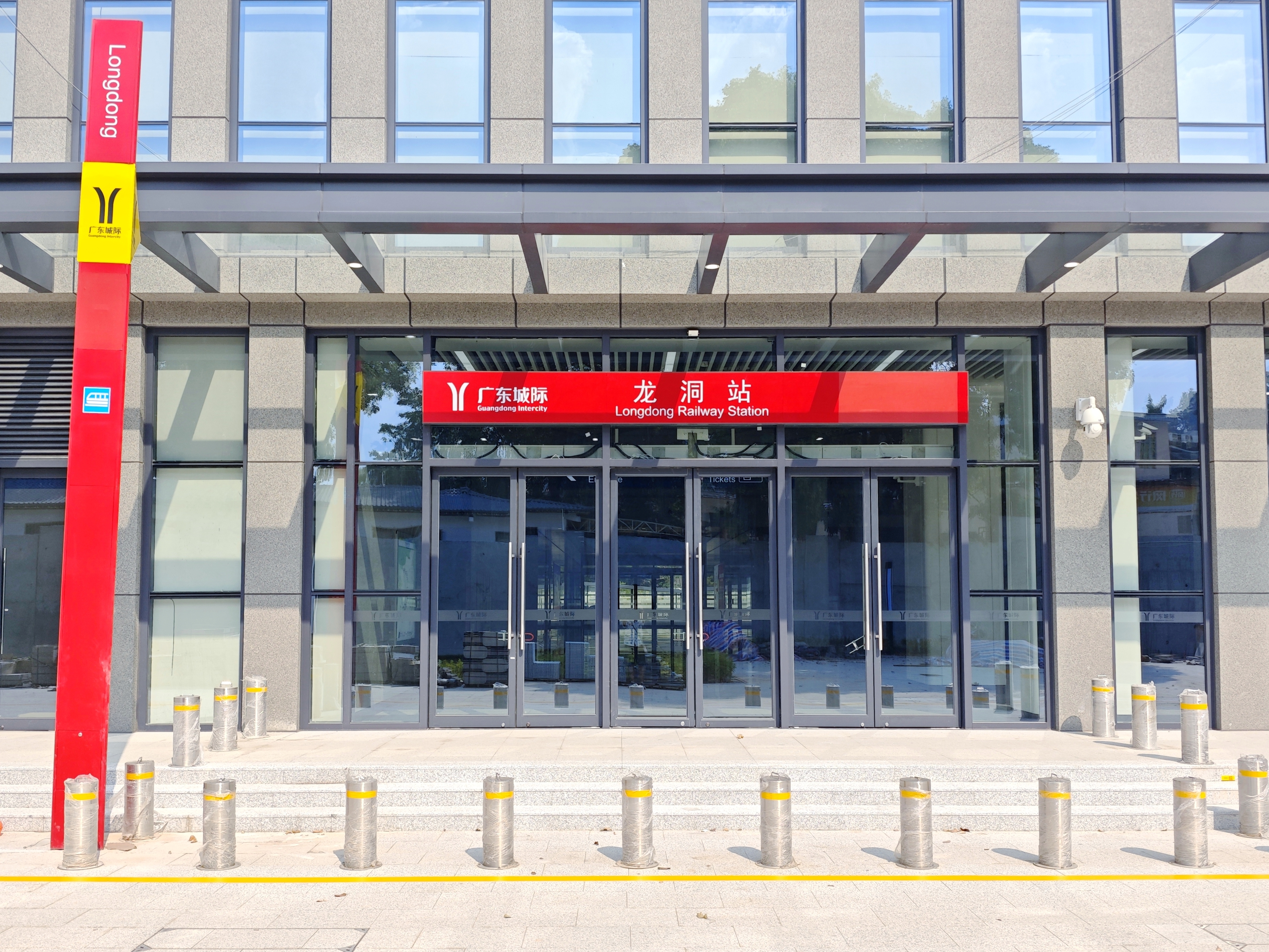
Entrance H (not open)

== History ==
On 1 January 2021, the second phase of traffic relief of the large-mileage open-cut section was completed. On 23 May 2022, the station topped out.

The right line tunnel between this station and Dayuan broke through on 13 October 2022.

On 29 September 2025, the station opened.

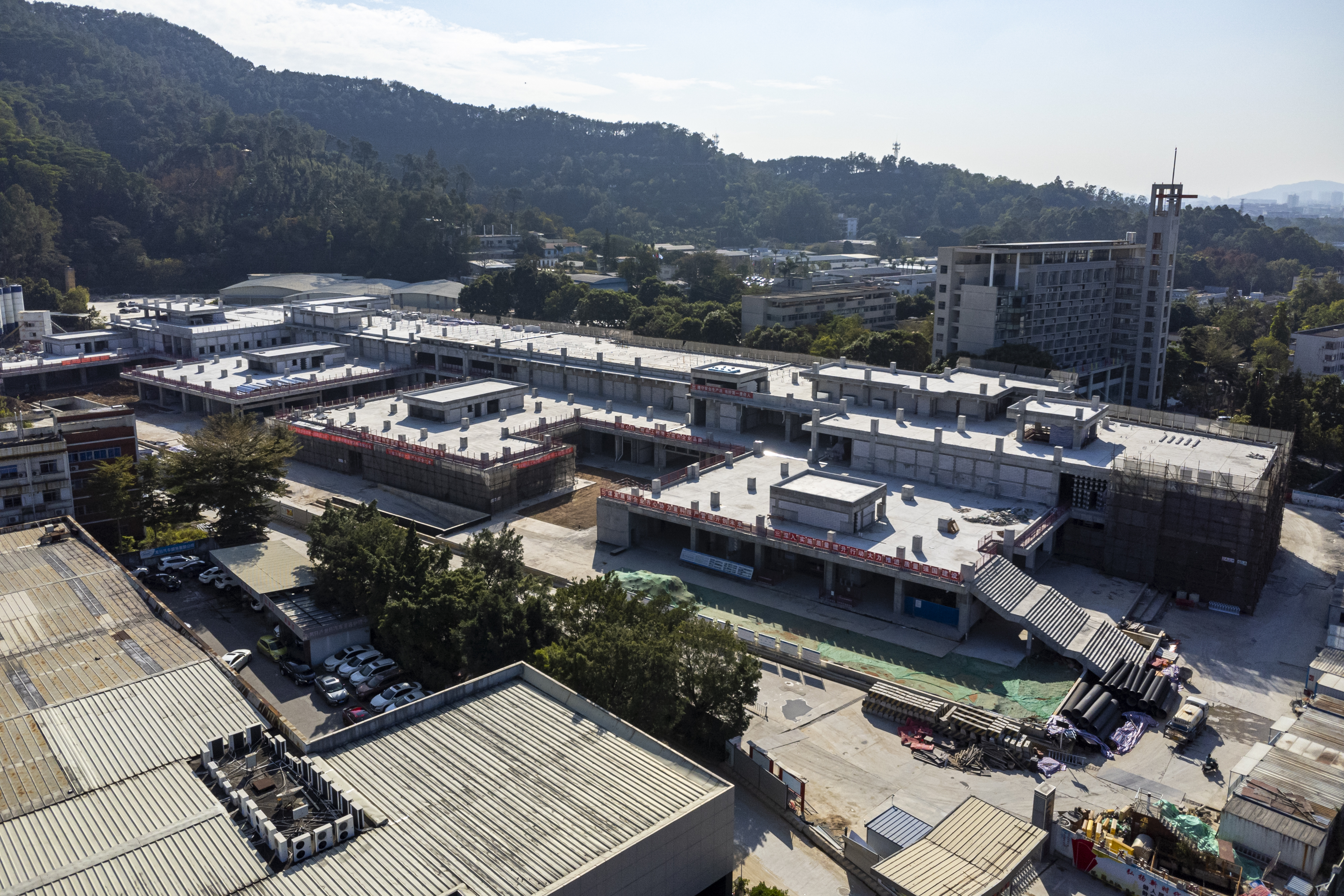
Construction site (January 2023)

== Transfer ==
The station provides interchange to Guangzhou Metro Line 6 via an out-of-system interchange (OSI).

== Gallery ==
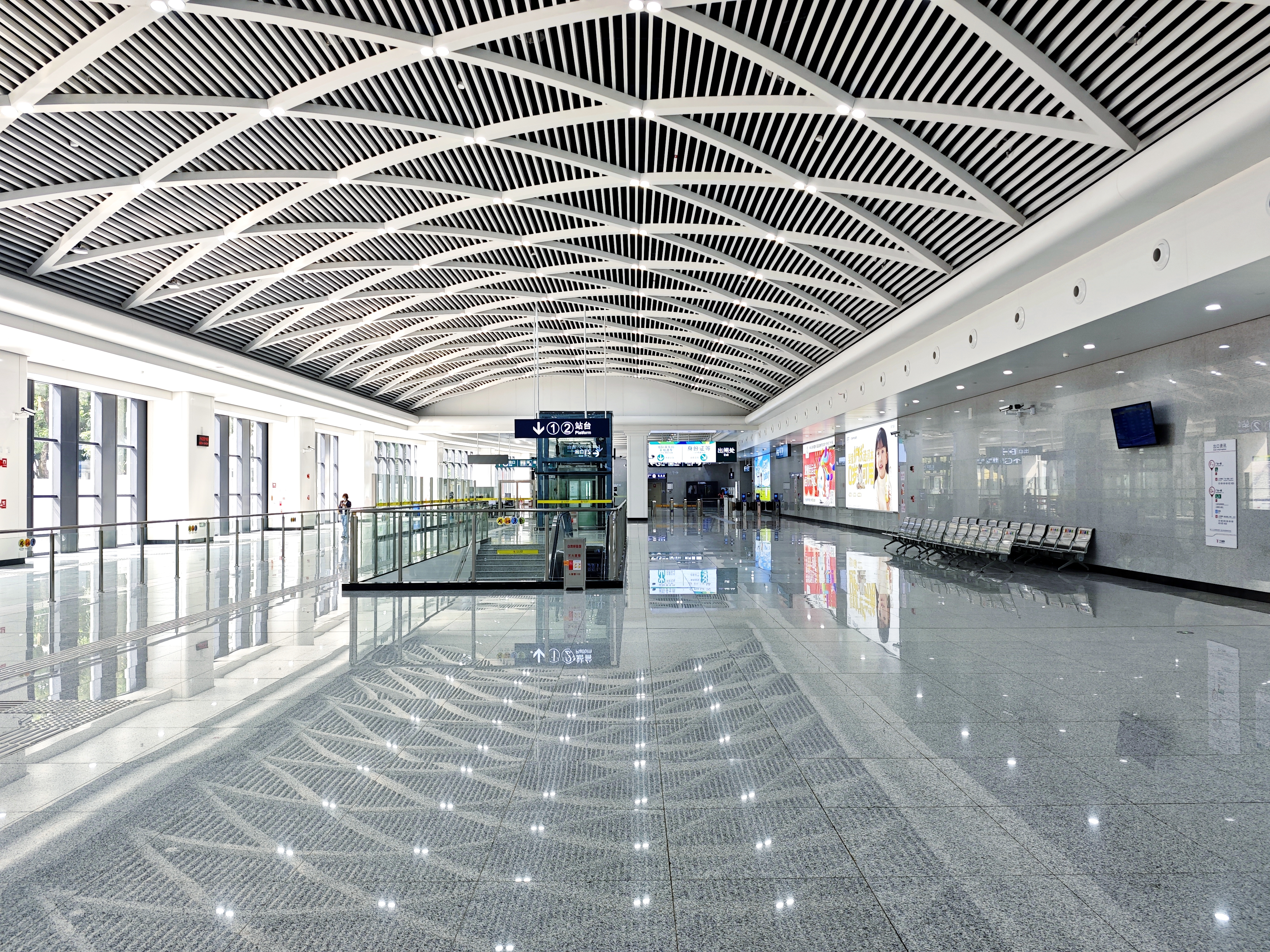
Concourse

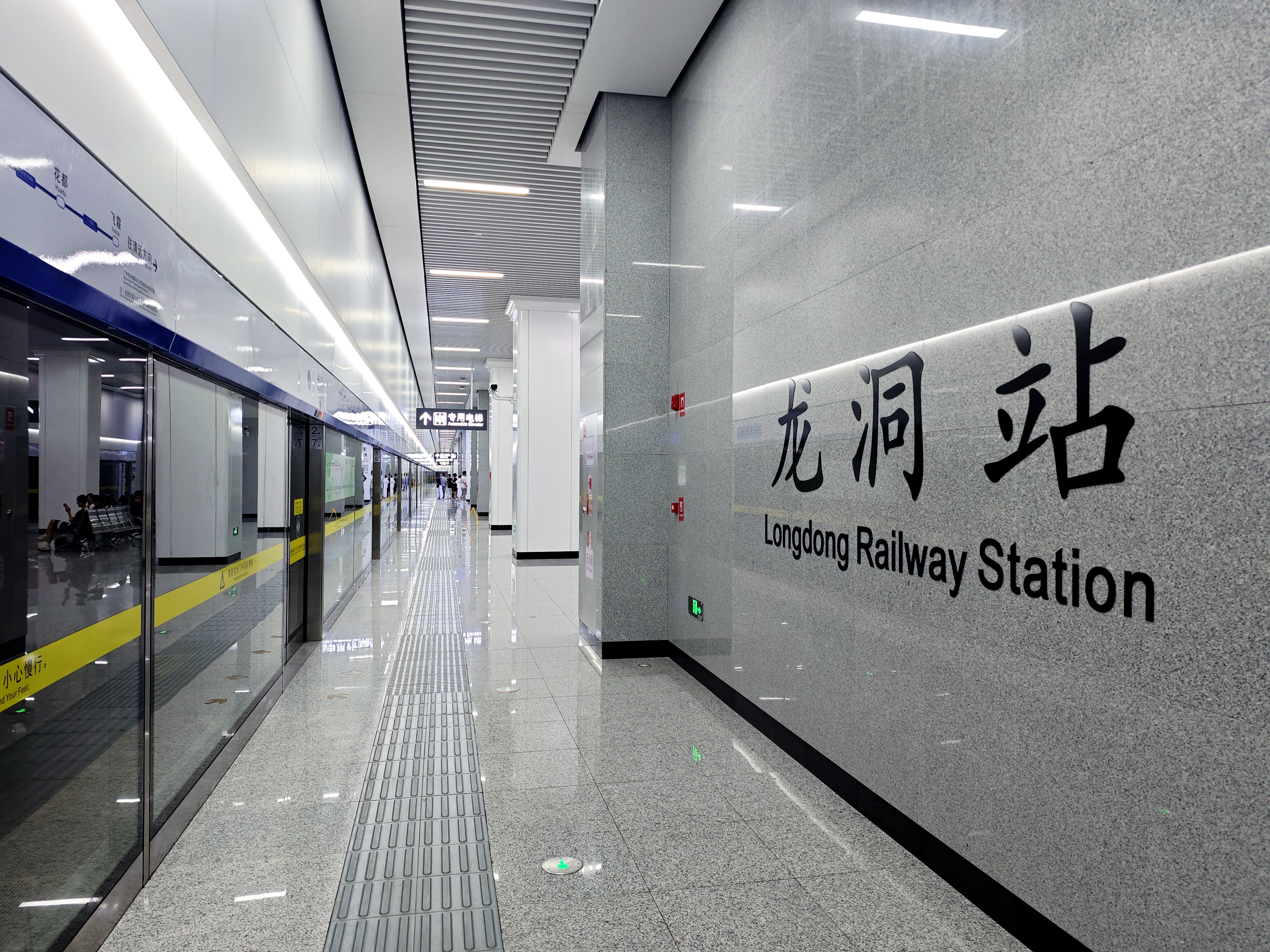
Platform 1

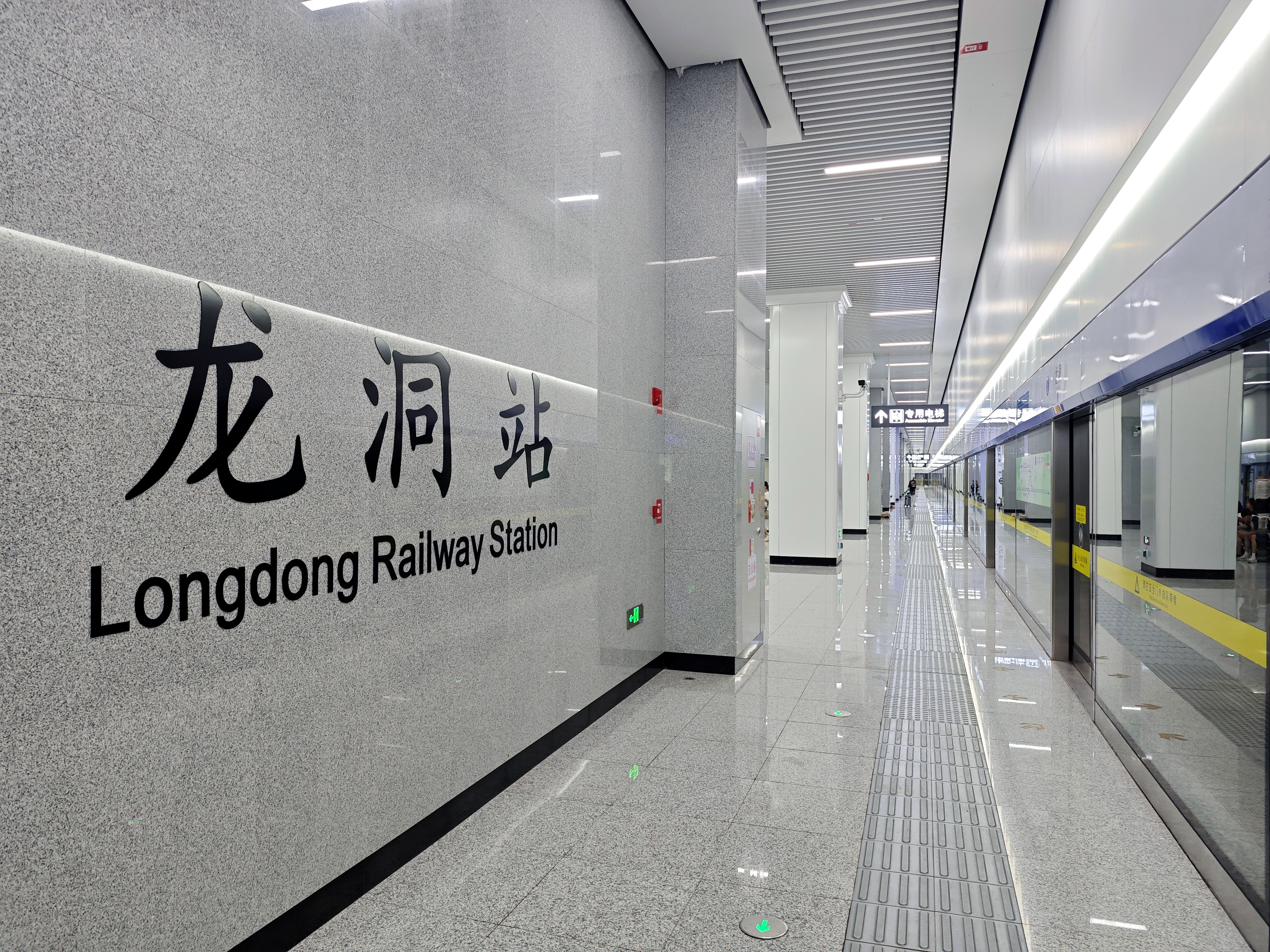
Platform 2
