= Longdong station (Guangzhou Metro) =

Guangzhou Metro station

Coordinates: 23.19096°N 113.37752°E

Longdong 龙洞
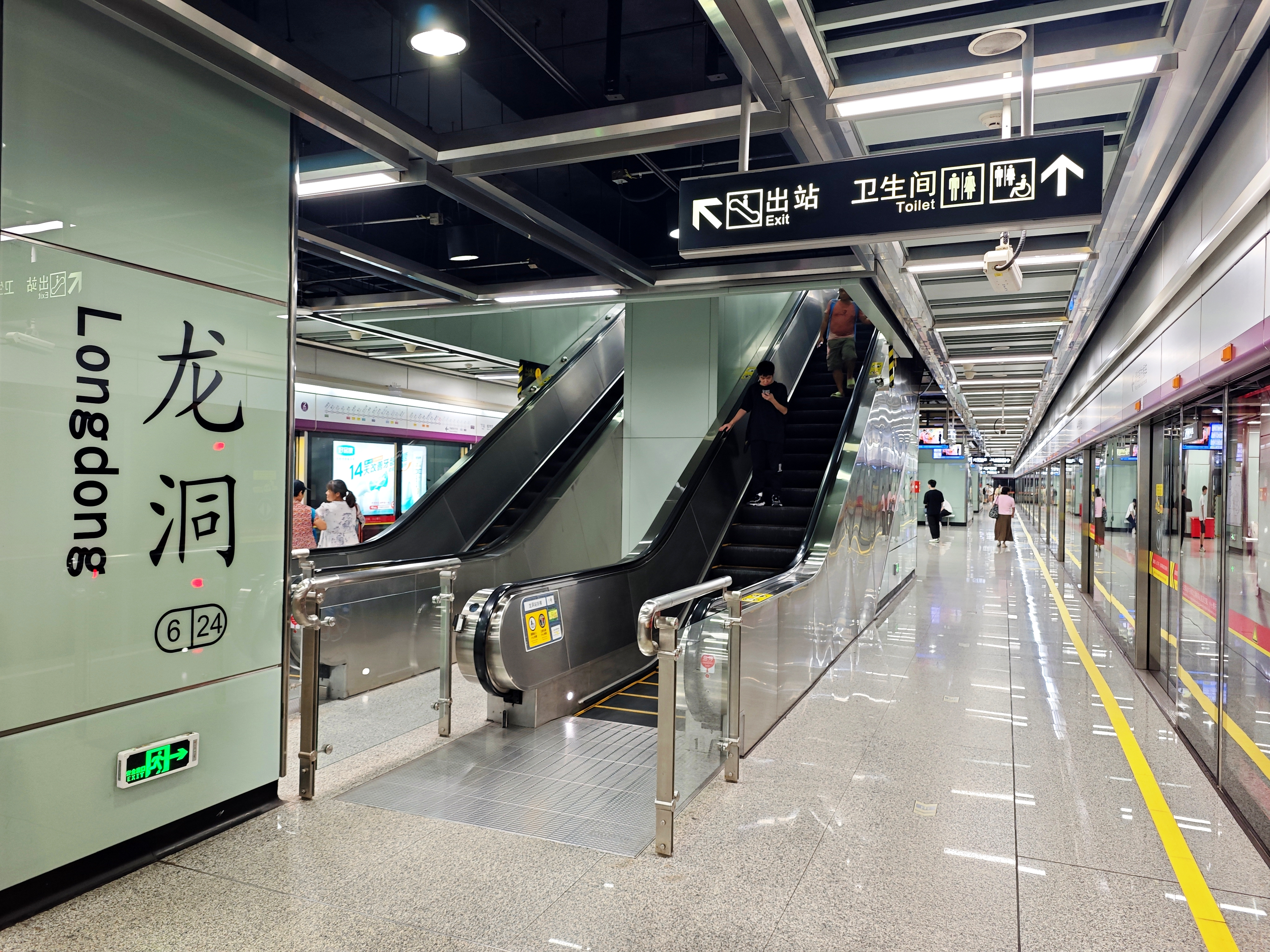

Chinese name
- Simplified Chinese: 龙洞站
- Traditional Chinese: 龍洞站
Transcriptions
Standard Mandarin
- Hanyu Pinyin: Lóngdòng Zhàn
Yue: Cantonese
- Jyutping: Lung^{4}dung^{6} Zaam^{6}

General information
- Location: Tianyuan Road (天源路); Tianhe District, Guangzhou, Guangdong; China
- Operated by: Guangzhou Metro Co. Ltd.
- Line: Line 6
- Platforms: 2 (1 island platform)
- Tracks: 2
- Connections: Longdong

Construction
- Structure type: Underground
- Accessible: Yes

Other information
- Station code: 624

History
- Opened: Line 6: 28 December 2016; 9 years ago

Services
Preceding station	Guangzhou Metro	Following station
Botanical Garden towards Xunfenggang	Line 6	Kemulang towards Xiangxue
Transfer at Longdong
Preceding station	Pearl River Delta Metropolitan Region Intercity Railway	Following station
Dayuan towards Huadu	Guangzhou East Ring intercity railway transfer at Longdong	Cencun towards Panyu
Location

Longdong station (Chinese: 龙洞站) is a station of Line 6 of the Guangzhou Metro. It started operations on 28 December 2016.

== Station layout ==
=== Line 6 ===
G	-	Exits; Transfer to ER
L1; Concourse	Lobby	Customer Service, Shops, Vending machines, ATMs
L2; Platforms	Platform 2	6 towards Xunfenggang (Botanical Garden)
L2; Platforms	Island platform, doors will open on the left
L2; Platforms	Platform 1	6 towards Xiangxue (Kemulang)

== Exits ==
Exit number	Exit location
Exit A	Guangshan Yilu
Exit B	Guangshan Yilu
Exit C	Guangshan Yilu
