= Guangzhou–Foshan circular intercity railway =

Intercity railway line in Guangzhou and Foshan, China

Overview
- Native name: 广佛环线
- Status: Huadu—Panyu: Operating Panyu–Foshan West: Operating under Guangzhao Foshan West—Huadu: Under construction
- Locale: Guangdong, China
- Termini: Huadu; Panyu
- Stations: 21 (20 in operation)

Service
- Type: Regional rail
- System: Pearl River Delta Metropolitan Region intercity railway
- Operator: Guangdong Intercity Railway Operation Co., Ltd.
- Depot: Longtang Depot (of Guangqing Intercity)

Technical
- Line length: 77.953 km (48.438 mi) (Huadu–Panyu); 126.4 km (78.5 mi) (full loop)
- Track gauge: 1,435 mm (4 ft 8 1/2 in) standard gauge
- Electrification: 50 Hz 25,000 V
- Operating speed: 200 km/h (124 mph) (Phase 1); 160 km/h (99 mph) (Phase 2)

The Guangzhou–Foshan circular intercity railway, also known as the Guangfo ring intercity railway, is a regional rail in the Pearl River Delta Metropolitan Region intercity railway system. The line will form a ring around Guangzhou, Guangdong, China. The first section between Guangzhou South to the Guangzhou Baiyun International Airport started construction in 2016. The line will operate with China Railway CRH6 EMUs running every 2.5 minutes.

The section from Huadu to Baiyun Airport North, named the Guangzhou East Ring Intercity, was opened on 30 November 2020 and had extended to Panyu on 29 September 2025.

== Route ==
The western section of this ring railway runs from Foshan West to Guangzhou North along the southernmost section of the Wuhan–Guangzhou high-speed railway. The northern section of this railway runs from Guangzhou North to Baiyun Airport North along the Airport Branch of the Guangzhou–Qingyuan intercity railway. The eastern section of this railway is from Baiyun Airport North to Panyu, with a branch towards Guangzhou Lianhuashan from Pazhou to connect to the Guangzhou–Huizhou intercity railway. The southern section completes this railway, connecting Panyu back to Foshan West along the Guangzhou–Zhaoqing intercity railway.

== Stations ==
- The line shares tracks with the Guangzhao intercity railway from Panyu to Foshan West.
- From 7 May 2026, Baiyun Airport South station is temporarily closed and will become non stopping station due to Terminal 1 of Baiyun Airport temporarily closed from 2:00 am on 7 May 2026 for upgrading facilities.

Section	Station Name	Chinese	Distance km		Pearl River Delta intercity railway transfers/connections	Metro transfers/connections	Location	
↑ Loop line towards Shenshan North ↑
North Ring	Huadu (Note: Located next to Guangzhou North.)	花都	0.00	0.00	GQ (through service)	9 24 (Guangzhou North)	Huadu	Guangzhou
North Ring	Huachengjie	花城街	11	11		18	Huadu	Guangzhou
North Ring	Huashanzhen	花山镇	3	14			Huadu	Guangzhou
North Ring	Baiyun Airport North (Baiyunjichangbei)	白云机场北	6.85	20.85	CAN	3 22 (Airport North (Terminal 2))	Huadu	Guangzhou
North Ring	Baiyun Airport South (Baiyunjichangnan)	白云机场南	0.96	21.81	CAN	3 22 (Airport South (Terminal 1))	Huadu	Guangzhou
North Ring	Baiyun Airport East (Baiyunjichangdong)	白云机场东	3.36	25.17	CAN	22 (Airport East (Terminal 3))	Baiyun	Guangzhou
North Ring	Zhuliao	竹料	6.97	32.14	SS (through service)	14 (Zhuliao)	Baiyun	Guangzhou
East Ring	Maofengshan	帽峰山	3.4	35.54			Baiyun	Guangzhou
East Ring	Dayuan	大源	4.7	40.24			Baiyun	Guangzhou
East Ring	Longdong	龙洞				6 (Longdong)	Tianhe	Guangzhou
East Ring	Cencun	岑村	3.4				Tianhe	Guangzhou
East Ring	Keyunlu	科韵路	4.7			5 (Keyun Lu)	Tianhe	Guangzhou
East Ring	Pazhou	琶洲			PL (through service)	8 11 28 (Pazhou)	Haizhu	Guangzhou
East Ring	Guangzhou Higher Education Mega Center	广州大学城					Panyu	Guangzhou
East Ring	Dashi East	大石东				3 (Dashi)	Panyu	Guangzhou
East Ring	Panyu	番禺		77.95	Guangzhao GH; IZQ Guangzhu	2 7 22 2 (Guangzhou South)	Panyu	Guangzhou
South Ring	Chencun	陈村	3.92		Guangzhao (through service)	7 (Chencun)	Shunde	Foshan
South Ring	Beijiao West	北滘西	6.63		Guangzhao (through service)	3	Shunde	Foshan
South Ring	Shunde North	顺德北	5.21		Guangzhao (through service)	Guangfo 3; 28 (Dongping)	Shunde	Foshan
South Ring	Zhangcha	张槎	9.48		Guangzhao (through service)	2	Chancheng	Foshan
South Ring	Foshan West (Foshanxi)	佛山西	11.18		Guangzhao (through service)	3 4 (Foshan West Railway Station)	Nanhai	Foshan
West Ring	Shishan East	狮山东					Nanhai	Foshan
West Ring	Nanhai University Town	南海大学城					Nanhai	Foshan
West Ring	Guanyao East	官窑东					Nanhai	Foshan
West Ring	Lishui	里水					Nanhai	Foshan
West Ring	Tanbu	炭步					Huadu	Guangzhou
West Ring	Xiuquan	秀全					Huadu	Guangzhou
West Ring	Shenshan North	神山北					Baiyun	Guangzhou
↓ Loop line towards Huadu ↓
