= Jinfeng station =

Guangzhou Metro station

Coordinates: 23.181468°N 113.451182°E

Jinfeng 金峰
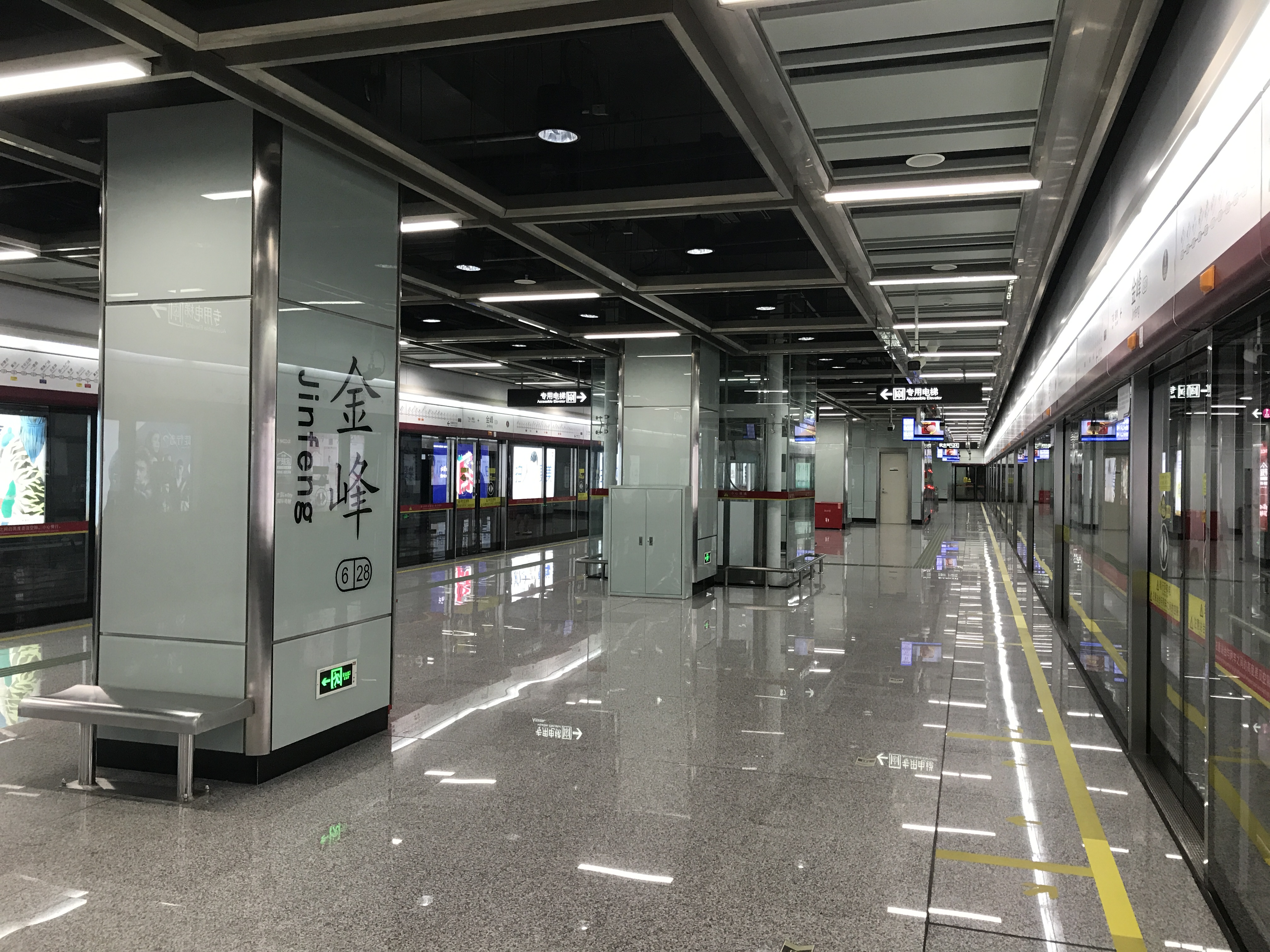

General information
- Location: Kaichuang Avenue (开创大道) and Xiangshan Road (香山路); Huangpu District, Guangzhou, Guangdong; China
- Operated by: Guangzhou Metro Co. Ltd.
- Line: Line 6

Other information
- Station code: 628

History
- Opened: 28 December 2016; 9 years ago

Services
Preceding station	Guangzhou Metro	Following station
Huangbei towards Xunfenggang	Line 6	Xiangang towards Xiangxue
Location

Jinfeng station (Chinese: 金峰站; pinyin: Jīnfēng Zhàn; Jyutping: gam^{1}fung^{1} zaam^{6}; lit. 'golden peak') is a station of Line 6 of the Guangzhou Metro. It started operations on 28 December 2016.

== Station layout ==
G	-	Exits
L1; Concourse	Lobby	Customer Service, Shops, Vending machines, ATMs
L2; Platforms	Platform 2	6 towards Xunfenggang (Huangbei)
L2; Platforms	Island platform, doors will open on the left
L2; Platforms	Platform 1	6 towards Xiangxue (Xiangang)

== Exits ==
Exit number	Exit location
Exit A	Kaichuang Dadao
Exit B	Kaichuang Dadao
Exit C	Kaichuang Dadao
Exit D	Kaichuang Dadao
