= Gaotangshi station =

Guangzhou Metro station

Coordinates: 23.191057°N 113.410408°E

Gaotangshi 高塘石
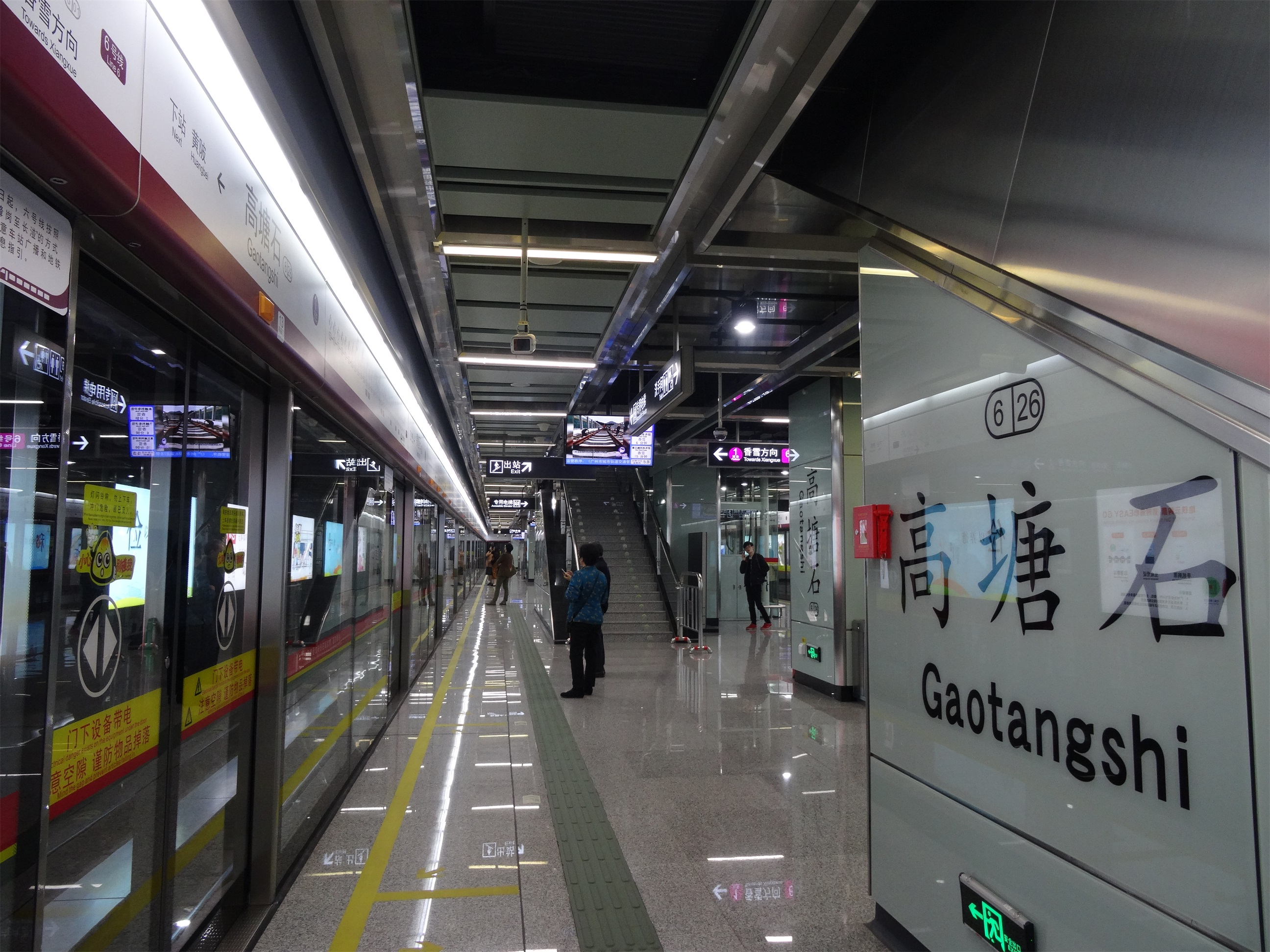

Chinese name
- Chinese: 高塘石
Transcriptions
Yue: Cantonese
- Jyutping: gou^{1} tong^{4} sek^{6}
- Hong Kong Romanization: Ko Tong Shek

General information
- Location: Guangshan (Guangzhou–Shantou) Highway) and Gaopu Road (高普路); Tianhe, Guangzhou, Guangdong; China
- Operated by: Guangzhou Metro Co. Ltd.
- Lines: Line 6; Line 10 (planned)

Construction
- Structure type: Underground

Other information
- Station code: 626

History
- Opened: 28 December 2016; 9 years ago

Services
Preceding station	Guangzhou Metro	Following station
Kemulang towards Xunfenggang	Line 6	Huangbei towards Xiangxue

Planned services
Preceding station	Guangzhou Metro	Following station
Tianhe Wetlands towards Xilang	Line 10	Terminus
Location

Gaotangshi station (Chinese: 高塘石站; pinyin: Gāotángshí Zhàn; Jyutping: gou^{1}tong^{4}sek^{6} zaam^{6}) is a station of Line 6 of the Guangzhou Metro. It started operations on 28 December 2016.

== Station layout ==
G	-	Exits
L1; Concourse	Lobby	Customer Service, Shops, Vending machines, ATMs
L2; Platforms	Platform 2	6 towards Xunfenggang (Kemulang)
L2; Platforms	Island platform, doors will open on the left
L2; Platforms	Platform 1	6 towards Xiangxue (Huangbei)

== Exits ==
Exit number	Exit location
Exit A	Guangshan Erlu
Exit B	Guangshan Erlu
