= Changban station =

Guangzhou Metro station

Coordinates: 23.178502°N 113.349435°E

Changban 长湴
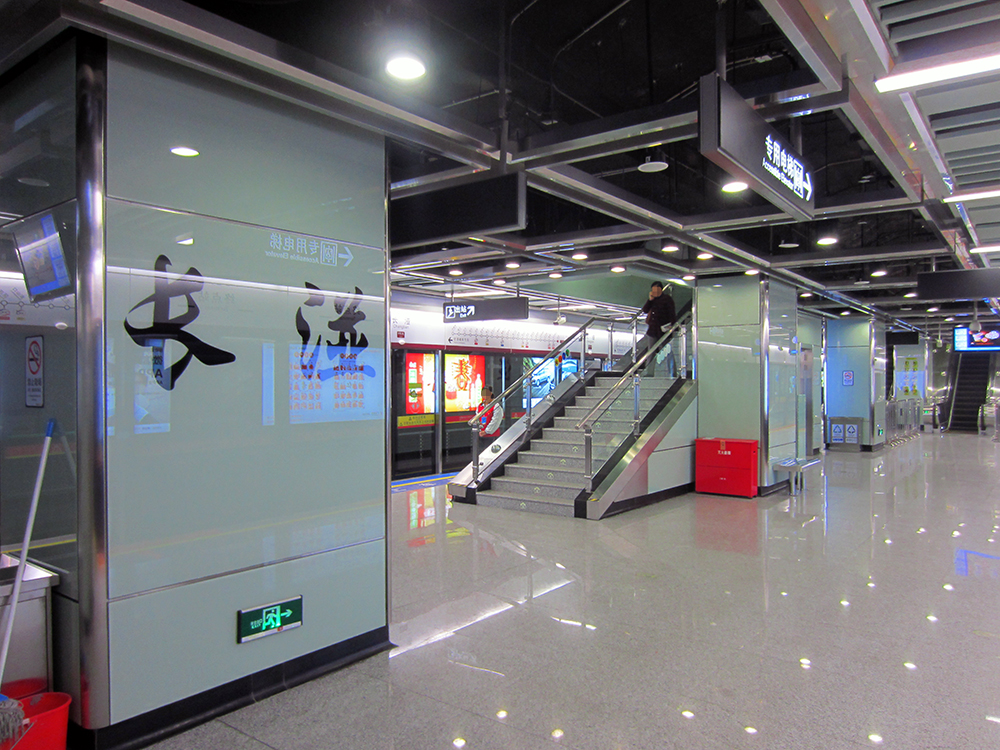

Chinese name
- Simplified Chinese: 长湴站
- Traditional Chinese: 長湴站
Transcriptions
Standard Mandarin
- Hanyu Pinyin: Chángbàn Zhàn
Yue: Cantonese
- Jyutping: coeng^{4}baan^{6} zaam^{6}

General information
- Location: Tianyuan Road (天源路); Tianhe District, Guangzhou, Guangdong; China
- Operated by: Guangzhou Metro Co. Ltd.
- Line: Line 6
- Platforms: 2 (1 island platform)

Construction
- Structure type: Underground

Other information
- Station code: 622

History
- Opened: 28 December 2013; 12 years ago

Services
Preceding station	Guangzhou Metro	Following station
Tianhe Coach Terminal towards Xunfenggang	Line 6	Botanical Garden towards Xiangxue
Location

Changban Station (Chinese: 长湴站) is a station of Guangzhou Metro Line 6. It is located underground in the Tianhe District and started operation on 28 December 2013.

== Station layout ==
G	-	Exits
L1; Concourse	Lobby	Customer Service, Shop, Vending machines, ATMs
L2; Platforms	Platform 2	6 towards Xunfenggang (Tianhe Coach Terminal)
L2; Platforms	Island platform, doors will open on the left
L2; Platforms	Platform 1	6 towards Xiangxue (Botanical Garden)

== Exits ==
Exit number	Exit location
Exit A	Tianyuan Lu
Exit C	Tianyuan Lu
