= Xiangang station =

Guangzhou Metro station

Coordinates: 23.172296°N 113.460177°E

Xiangang 暹岗
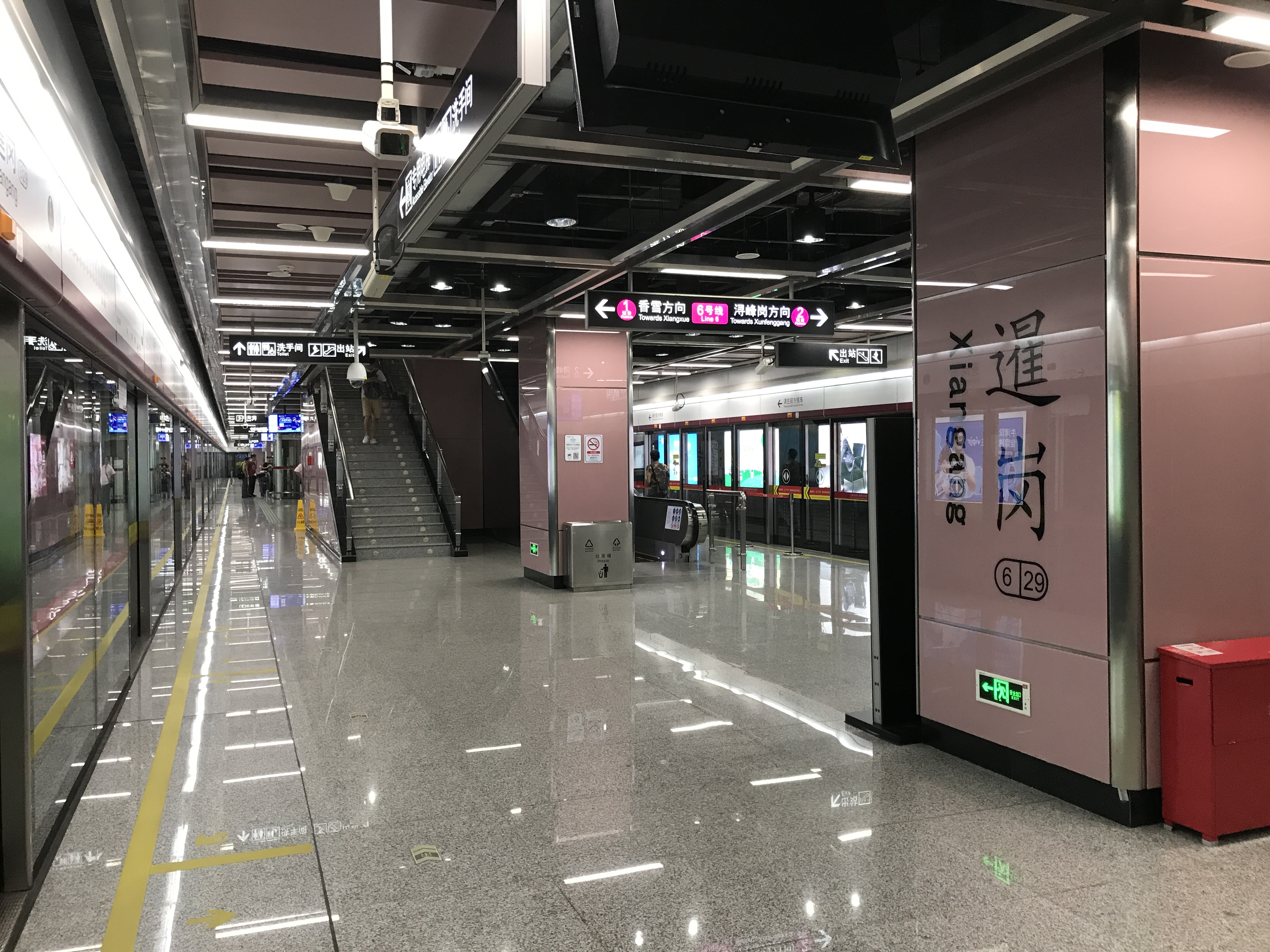

Chinese name
- Simplified Chinese: 暹岗站
- Traditional Chinese: 暹崗站
Transcriptions
Standard Mandarin
- Hanyu Pinyin: Xiāngǎng Zhàn
Yue: Cantonese
- Jyutping: cim^{3}gong^{1} zaam^{6}

General information
- Location: Kaichuang Avenue (开创大道) and Kexue Avenue (科学大道); Huangpu District, Guangzhou, Guangdong; China
- Operated by: Guangzhou Metro Co. Ltd.
- Line: Line 6

Other information
- Station code: 629

History
- Opened: 28 December 2016; 9 years ago

Services
Preceding station	Guangzhou Metro	Following station
Jinfeng towards Xunfenggang	Line 6	Suyuan towards Xiangxue
Location

Xiangang station (Chinese: 暹岗站) is a station of Line 6 of the Guangzhou Metro. It started operations on 28 December 2016.

== Station layout ==
G	-	Exits
L1; Concourse	Lobby	Customer Service, Shops, Vending machines, ATMs
L2; Platforms	Platform 2	6 towards Xunfenggang (Jinfeng)
L2; Platforms	Island platform, doors will open on the left
L2; Platforms	Platform 1	6 towards Xiangxue (Suyuan)

== Exits ==
Exit number	Exit location
Exit B	Kexue Dadao
Exit C	Kaichuang Dadao
Exit D	Kaichuang Dadao
