= Huangbei station =

Guangzhou Metro station

Coordinates: 23.188379°N 113.433738°E

Huangbei 黄陂
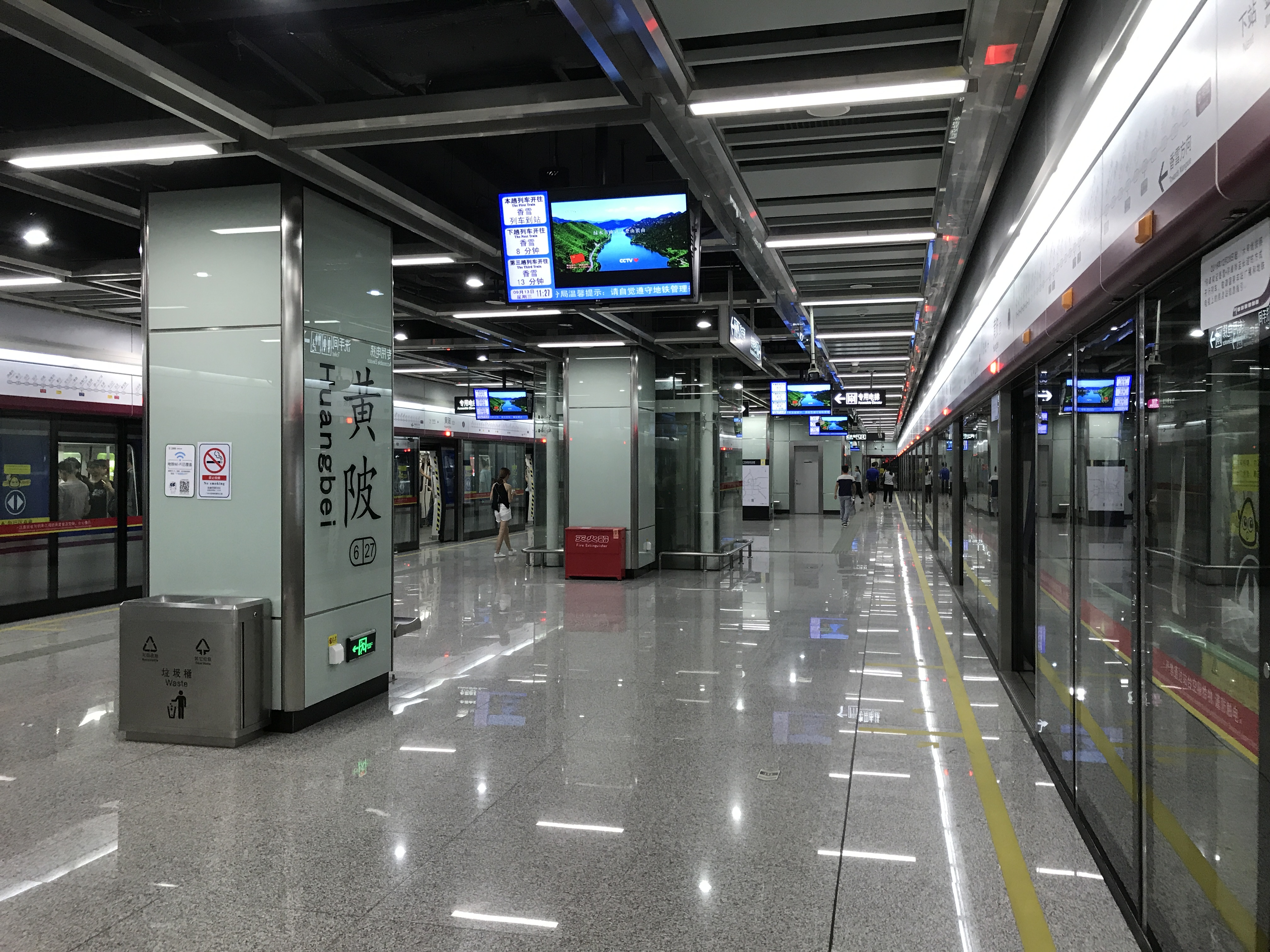

Chinese name
- Simplified Chinese: 黄陂站
- Traditional Chinese: 黃陂站
Transcriptions
Standard Mandarin
- Hanyu Pinyin: Huángbēi Zhàn
Yue: Cantonese
- Jyutping: wong^{4}bei^{1} zaam^{6}

General information
- Location: Guangshan (Guangzhou–Shantou) Highway); Huangpu District, Guangzhou, Guangdong; China
- Operated by: Guangzhou Metro Co. Ltd.
- Line: Line 6

Other information
- Station code: 627

History
- Opened: 28 December 2016; 9 years ago

Services
Preceding station	Guangzhou Metro	Following station
Gaotangshi towards Xunfenggang	Line 6	Jinfeng towards Xiangxue
Location

Huangbei station (Chinese: 黄陂站) is a station of Line 6 of the Guangzhou Metro. It started operations on 28 December 2016.

== Station layout ==
G	-	Exits
L1; Concourse	Lobby	Customer Service, Shops, Vending machines, ATMs
L2; Platforms	Platform 2	6 towards Xunfenggang (Gaotangshi)
L2; Platforms	Island platform, doors will open on the left
L2; Platforms	Platform 1	6 towards Xiangxue (Jinfeng)

== Exits ==
Exit number	Exit location
Exit B	Guangshan Erlu
Exit C	Guangshan Erlu
Exit D	Guangshan Erlu
