= Kemulang station =

Guangzhou Metro station

Coordinates: 23.193462°N 113.395991°E

Kemulang 柯木塱
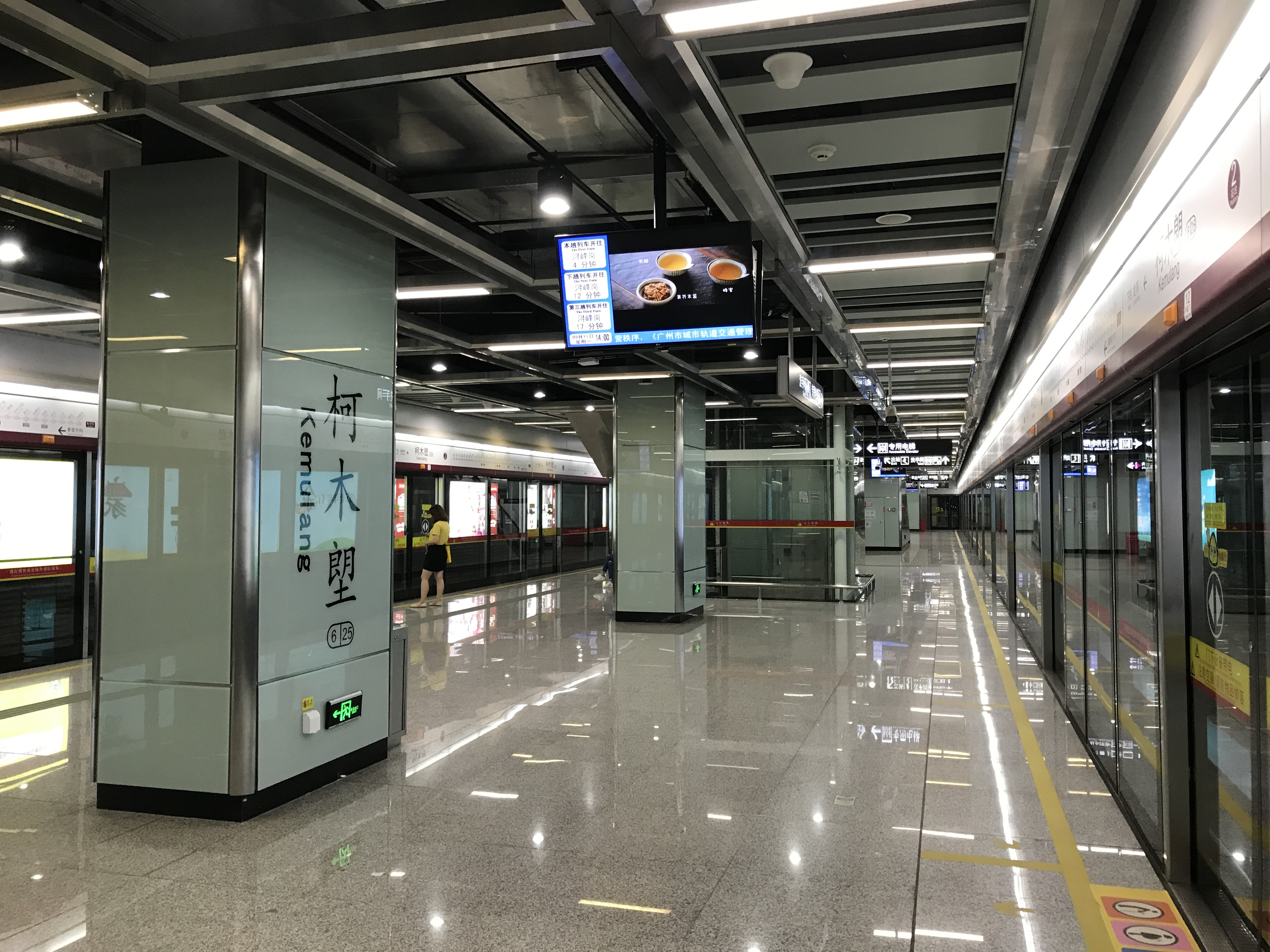

General information
- Location: Guangshan (Guangzhou–Shantou) Highway); Tianhe District, Guangzhou, Guangdong; China
- Operator: Guangzhou Metro Co. Ltd.
- Line: Line 6

Other information
- Station code: 625

History
- Opened: 28 June 2017; 9 years ago

Services
Preceding station	Guangzhou Metro	Following station
Longdong towards Xunfenggang	Line 6	Gaotangshi towards Xiangxue
Location

Kemulang station (Chinese: 柯木塱站; pinyin: Kēmùlǎng Zhàn; Jyutping: o^{1}muk^{6}long^{5} zaam^{6}) is a station of Line 6 of the Guangzhou Metro. It started operations on 28 June 2017.

== Station layout ==
G	-	Exits
L1; Concourse	Lobby	Customer Service, Shops, Vending machines, ATMs
L2; Platforms	Platform 2	6 towards Xunfenggang (Longdong)
L2; Platforms	Island platform, doors will open on the left
L2; Platforms	Platform 1	6 towards Xiangxue (Gaotangshi)

== Exits ==
Exit number	Exit location
Exit A	Guangshan Yilu
Exit B	Guangshan Yilu
