= Dayuan railway station =

Guangdong Intercity railway station in Guangzhou, China

Dayuan 大源
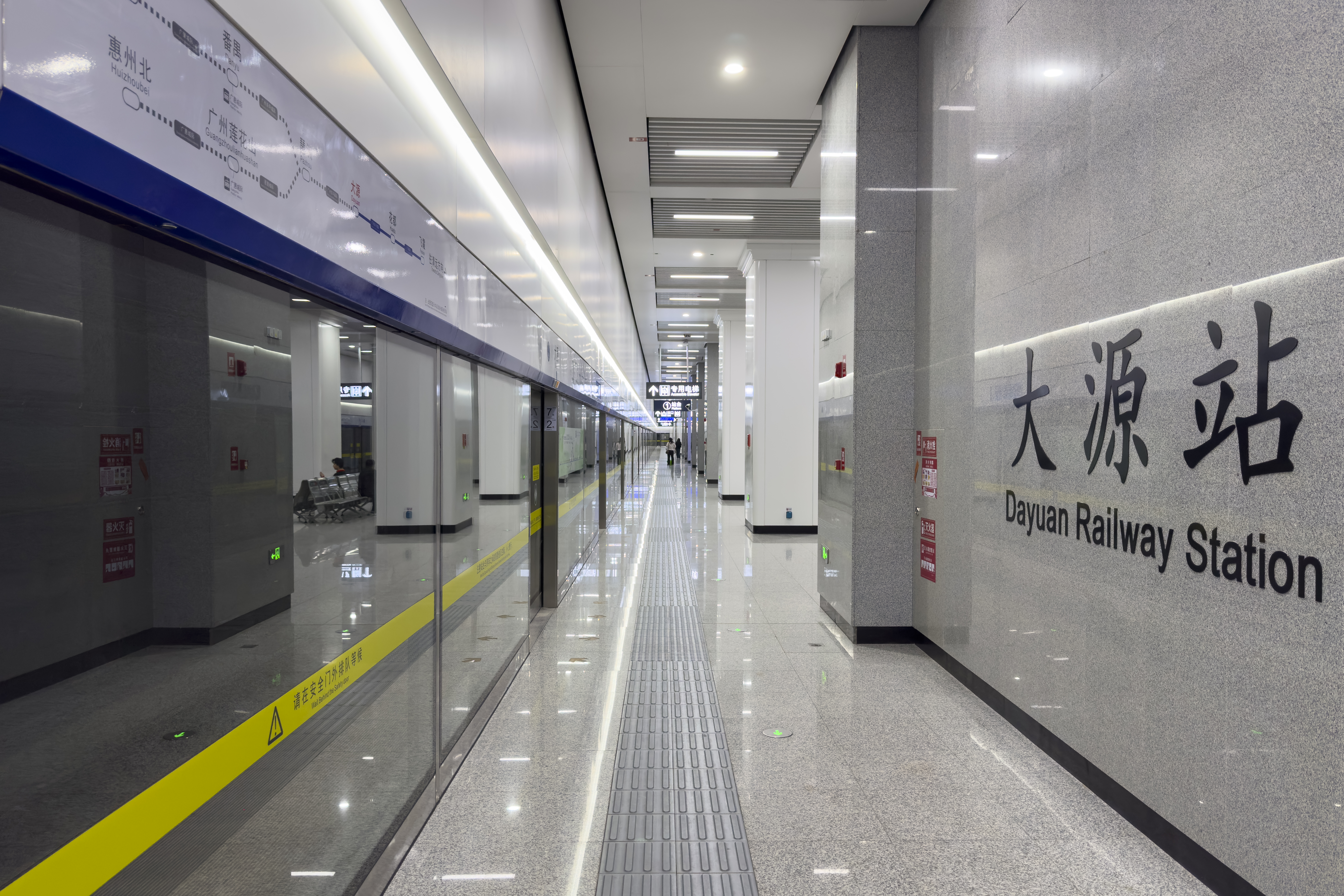
- Platform

Chinese name
- Chinese: 大源站
Transcriptions
Standard Mandarin
- Hanyu Pinyin: Dàyuán Zhàn
Yue: Cantonese
- Yale Romanization: Daaihyùn Jaahm
- Jyutping: Daai^{6}jyun^{4} Zaam^{6}

General information
- Location: East side of Dayuan Road Middle (大源中路); Dayuan Subdistrict, Baiyun District, Guangzhou, Guangdong; China
- Coordinates: 23°15′1.318″N 113°20′59.489″E
- Owner: Pearl River Delta Metropolitan Region intercity railway
- Operator: Guangdong Intercity
- Line: Guangzhou East Ring intercity railway
- Platforms: 2 (1 island platform)
- Tracks: 2

Construction
- Structure type: Underground
- Accessible: Yes

Other information
- Station code: DFQ (Pinyin: DYU)

History
- Opened: 29 September 2025 (10 months ago)

Services
Preceding station	Pearl River Delta Metropolitan Region Intercity Railway	Following station
Maofengshan towards Huadu	Guangzhou East Ring intercity railway	Longdong towards Panyu
Location

Dayuan railway station (Chinese: 大源站; pinyin: Dàyuán Zhàn; Cantonese Yale: Daaihyùn Jaahm) is an underground railway station on Guangzhou East Ring intercity railway located in Baiyun District, Guangzhou, Guangdong, China. It opened on 29 September 2025.

== Features ==
The station has an underground island platform. South of the station is a set of crossover lines. The station also has two wind shafts and a cooling tower.

=== Entrances/exits ===
The station has 3 points of entry/exit, all are located on the north side of Dayuan East Road. In its initial opening, only Exit D was opened.

- ~~B~~: (Not open)
- ~~C~~: (Not open)
- D: Dayuan East Road

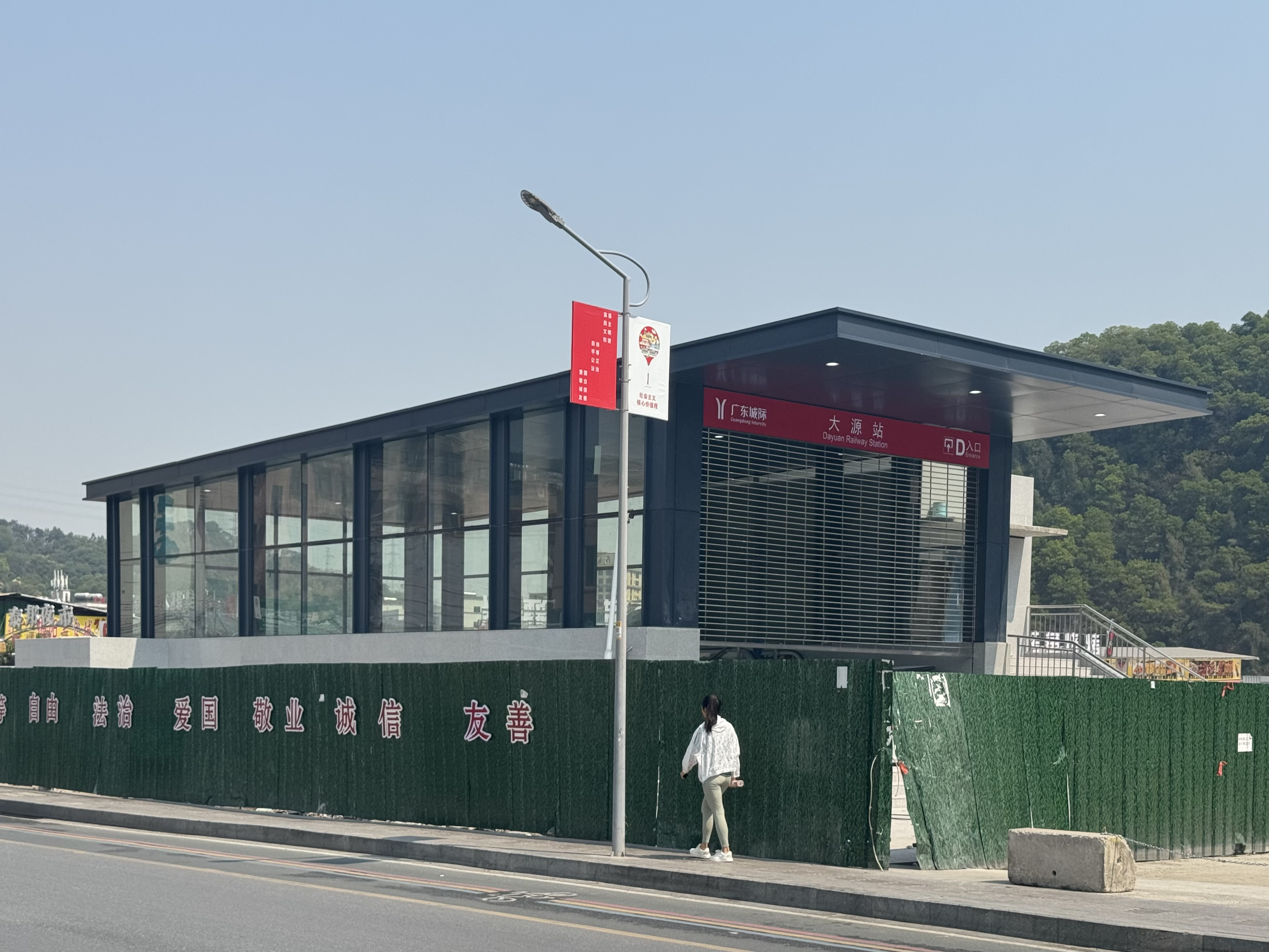
Entrance D (March 2025)

== History ==
On 7 May 2021, the station completed construction of the underground diaphragm wall. On 28 June 2022, the station topped out and completed construction of the main structure. In May 2025, the station completed the "three rights" transfer.

On 29 September 2025, the station opened.
