= Botanical Garden station (Guangzhou Metro) =

Guangzhou Metro station

Coordinates: 23.190164°N 113.365686°E

Botanical Garden 植物园
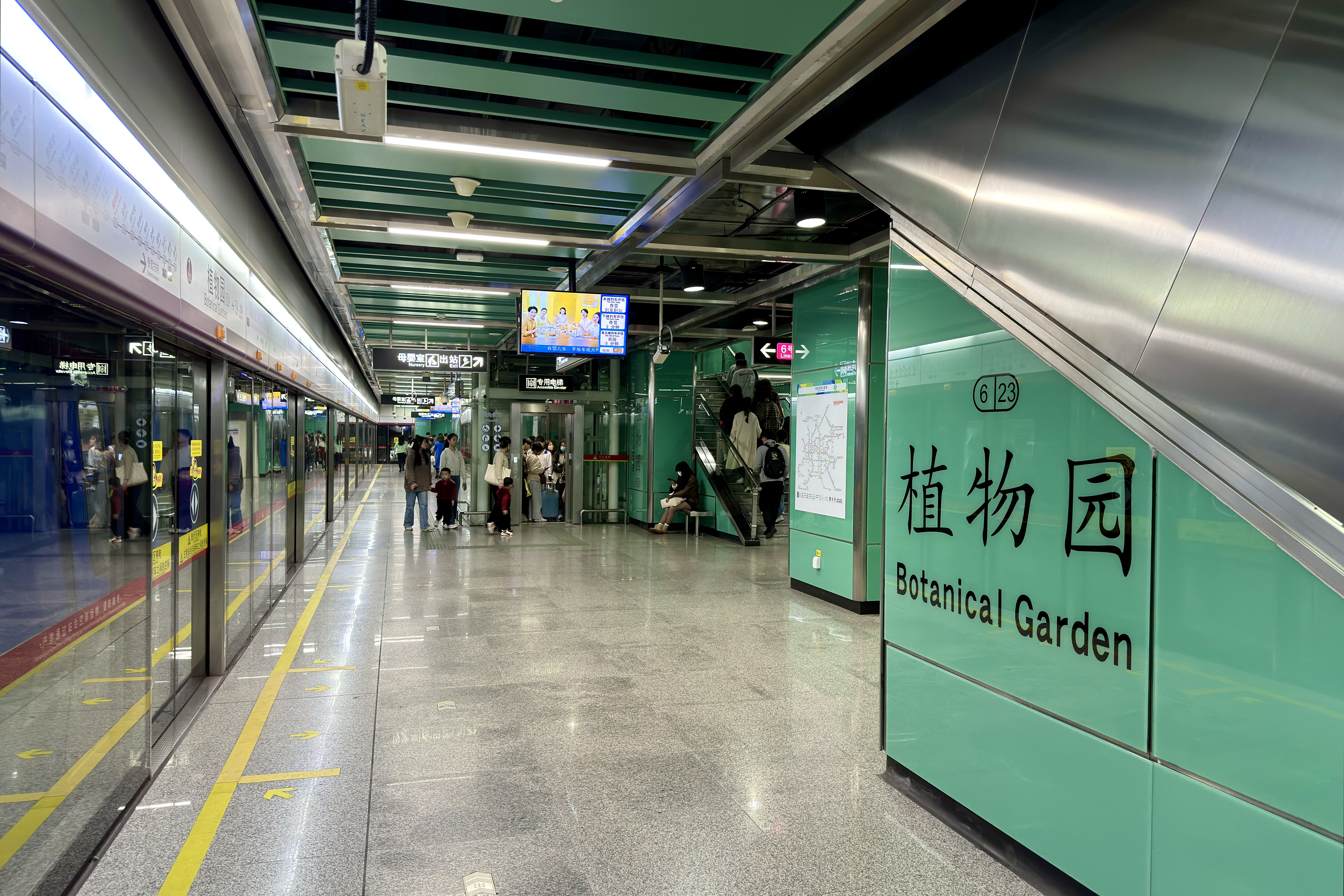
- Platform 1 of the station

Chinese name
- Simplified Chinese: 植物园站
- Traditional Chinese: 植物園站
Transcriptions
Standard Mandarin
- Hanyu Pinyin: Zhíwùyuán Zhàn
Yue: Cantonese
- Jyutping: zik^{6}mat^{6}jyun^{4} zaam^{6}

General information
- Location: Tianyuan Road (天源路); Tianhe District, Guangzhou, Guangdong; China
- Operator: Guangzhou Metro Co. Ltd.
- Line: Line 6
- Platforms: 4 (2 island platform)

Construction
- Structure type: Underground

Other information
- Station code: 623

History
- Opened: 28 June 2017; 9 years ago

Services
Preceding station	Guangzhou Metro	Following station
Changban towards Xunfenggang	Line 6	Longdong towards Xiangxue
Location

Botanical Garden Station (Chinese: 植物园站) is a station of Line 6 on the Guangzhou Metro. The station is located near South China National Botanical Garden, and it began operations on 28 June 2017, six months after the opening date of Line 6 east extension.

== Station layout ==
G	-	Exits
L1; Concourse	Lobby	Customer Service, Shops, Vending machines
L2; Platforms	Platform	Reserved for 20 (Long-term Plan)
L2; Platforms	Island platform
L2; Platforms	Platform 2	6 towards Xunfenggang (Changban)
L2; Platforms	Platform 1	6 towards Xiangxue (Longdong)
L2; Platforms	Island platform
L2; Platforms	Platform	Reserved for 20 (Long-term Plan)

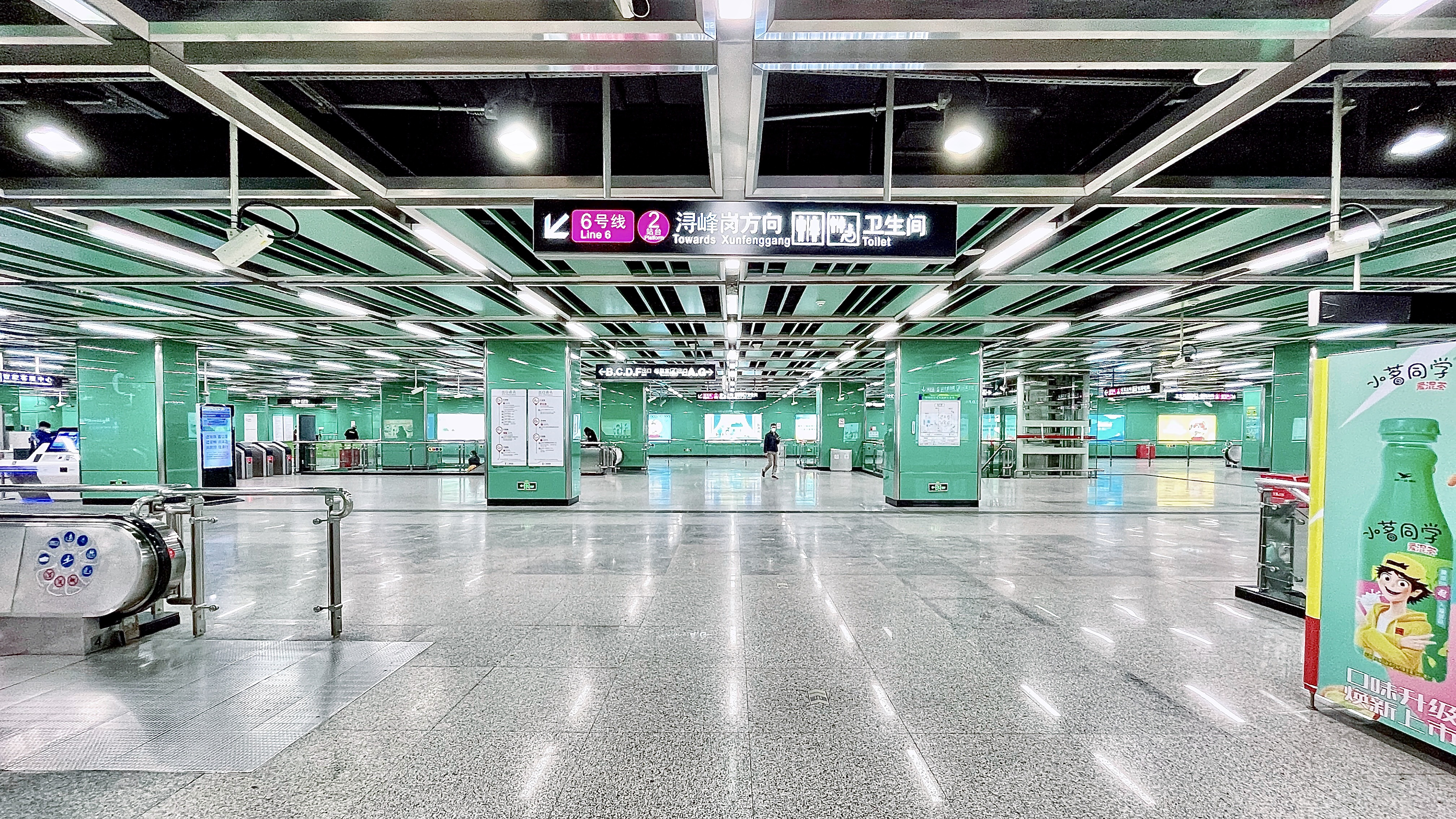
Lobby

== Exits ==
There are six exits in the station, located on both sides of Tianyuan Road.

Exit number	Exit location
Exit A	Tianyuan Lu
Exit B	Tianyuan Lu
Exit C	Tianyuan Lu
Exit D	Tianyuan Lu
Exit F	Tianyuan Lu
Exit G	Tianyuan Lu
