= Cencun railway station =

Guangdong Intercity railway station in Guangzhou, China

Cencun 岑村
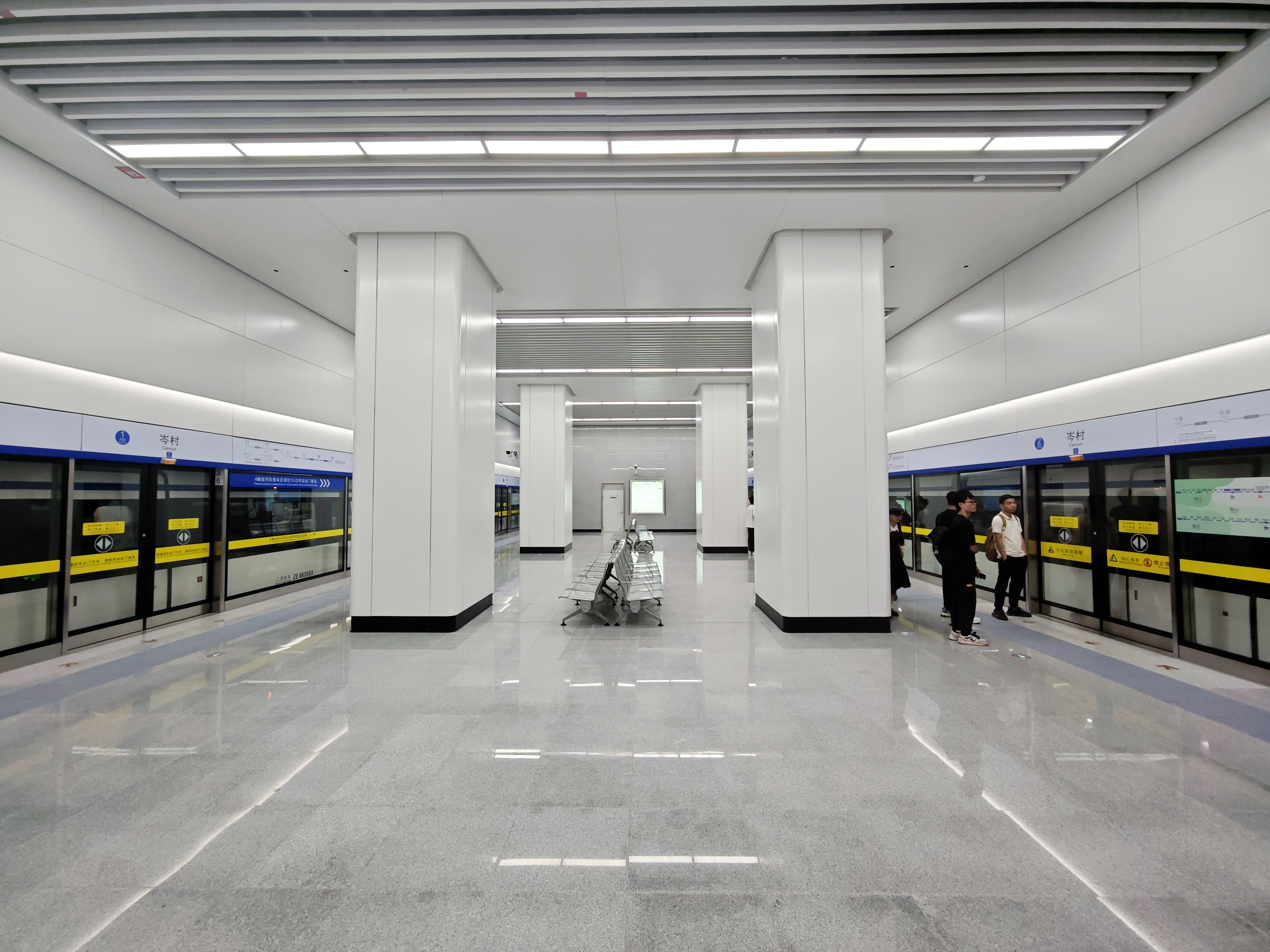
- Platform

Chinese name
- Chinese: 岑村站
Transcriptions
Standard Mandarin
- Hanyu Pinyin: Céncūn Zhàn
Yue: Cantonese
- Yale Romanization: Sàhmchyūn Jaahm
- Jyutping: Sam^{4}cyun^{1} Zaam^{6}

General information
- Location: Intersection of Keyun North Road and Mubei West Road (沐陂西路), Cencun; Changxing Subdistrict, Tianhe District, Guangzhou, Guangdong; China
- Coordinates: 23°9′35.39″N 113°22′36.62″E
- Owner: Pearl River Delta Metropolitan Region intercity railway
- Operator: Guangdong Intercity
- Line: Guangzhou East Ring intercity railway
- Platforms: 2 (1 island platform)
- Tracks: 4

Construction
- Structure type: Underground
- Accessible: Yes

Other information
- Station code: CPQ (Pinyin: CCU)

History
- Opened: 29 September 2025 (10 months ago)

Services
Preceding station	Pearl River Delta Metropolitan Region Intercity Railway	Following station
Longdong towards Huadu	Guangzhou East Ring intercity railway	Keyunlu towards Panyu
Location

Cencun railway station (Chinese: 岑村站; pinyin: Céncūn Zhàn; Cantonese Yale: Sàhmchyūn Jaahm) is an underground railway station on Guangzhou East Ring intercity railway located in Tianhe District, Guangzhou, Guangdong, China. It opened on 29 September 2025.

== Features ==
The station has an underground island platform with passing loops on either side of the station. It has 4 points of entry/exit, 1 emergency exit, 2 sets of wind shafts and a cooling tower. The surrounding area is mainly the residences of Cencun, and also Cencun Airport and XPeng Motors Intelligent Industrial Park.

=== Entrances/exits ===
The station is planned to have 4 points of entry/exit, but only 2 are currently open. Exit B is accessible via elevator.

- A: Cencun Fengzhuang Main Street
- B: Keyun Road
- ~~D~~: (Not open)
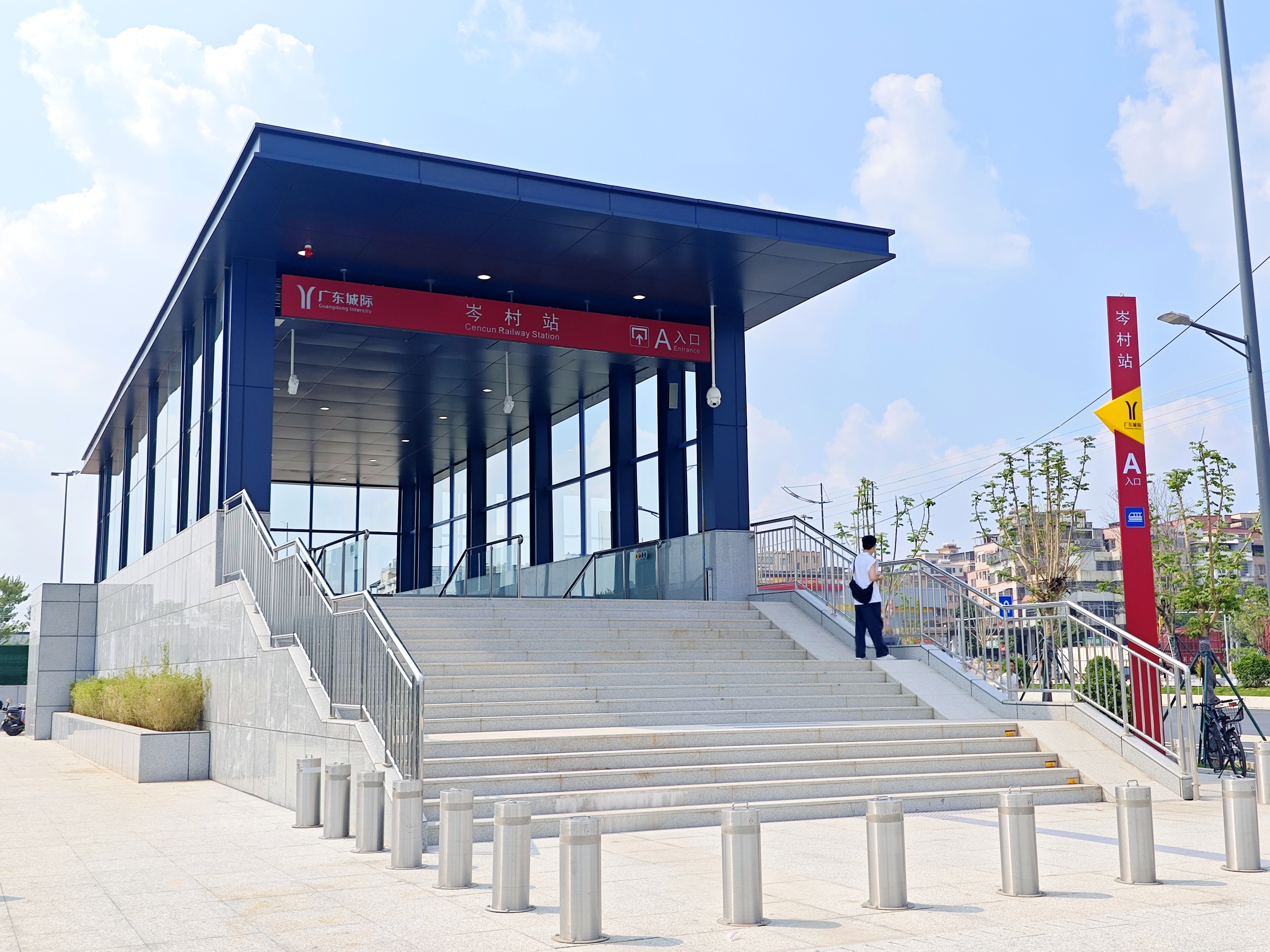
Entrance A

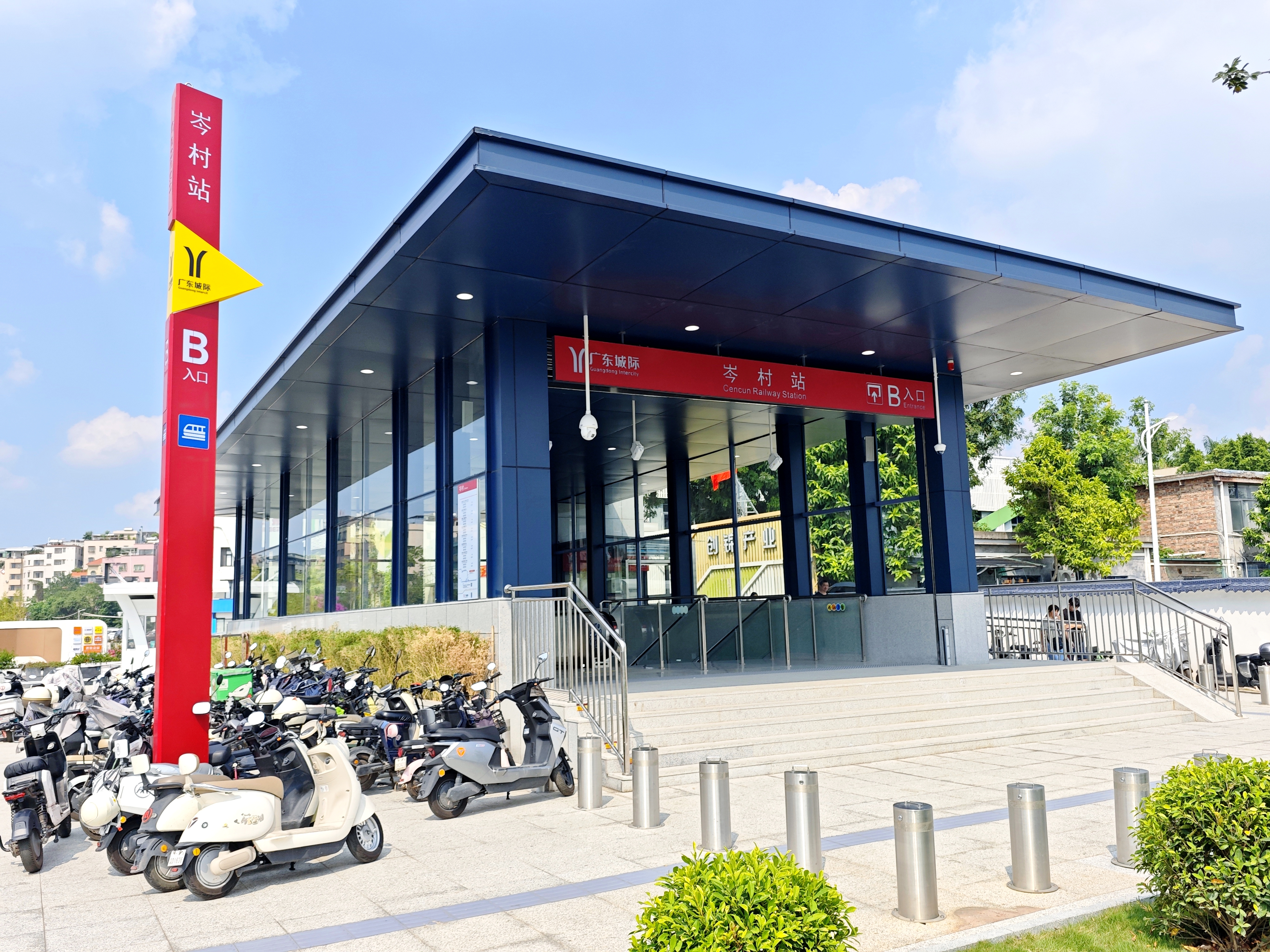
Entrance B

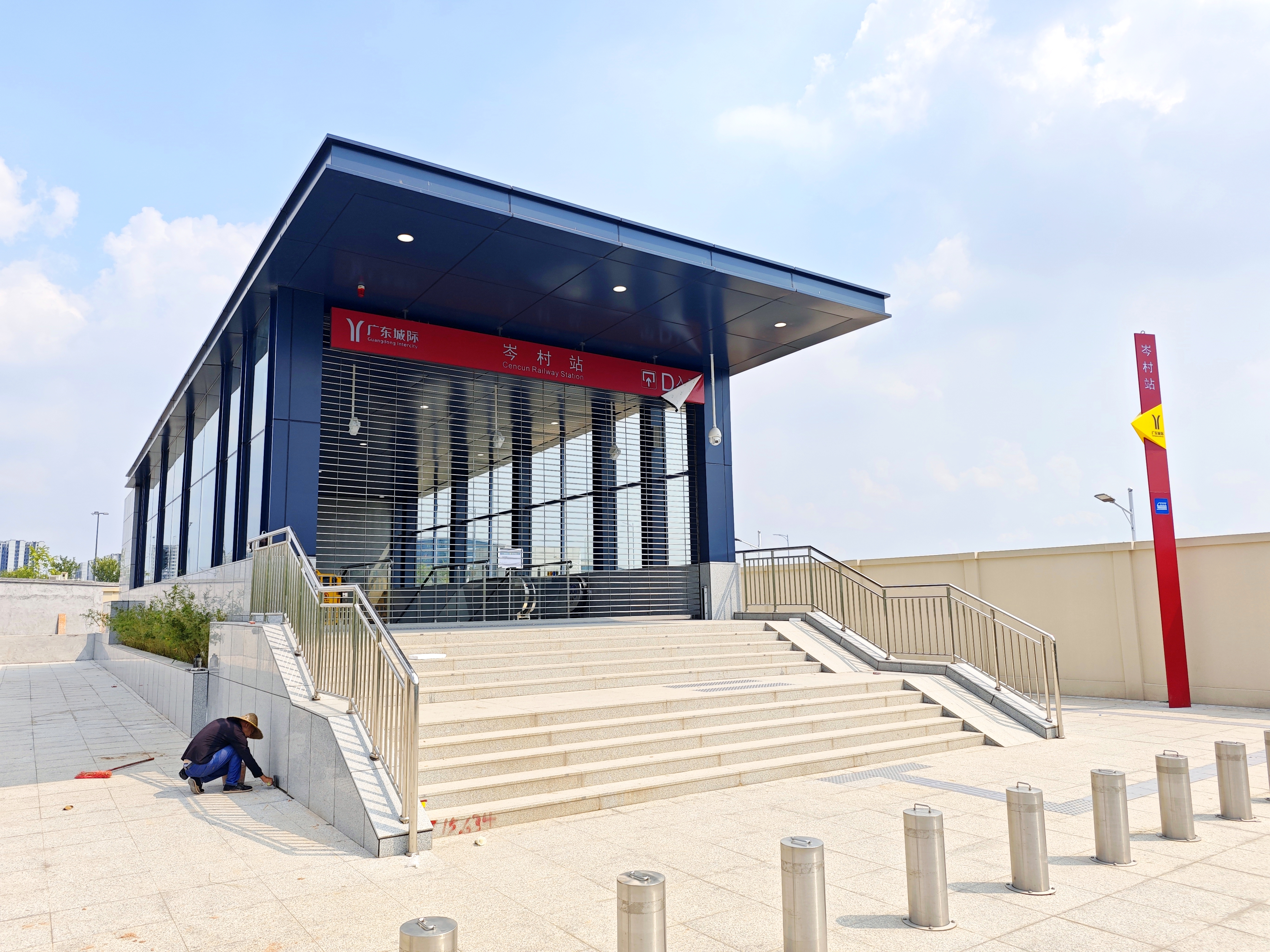
Entrance D (not open)

== History ==
The Guangzhou–Foshan circular intercity railway was originally planned to pass through Tianhe Coach Terminal station and did not set up this station. When the EIA was announced in 2015, the alignment was changed to pass through Cencun and set up Smart City station to reduce the difficulty of project implementation, fill the gap in rail transit in the area, and drive appreciation of surrounding land. The station was subsequently constructed, and renamed to Cencun station before opening.

The station's main structure topped out on 30 October 2022.

On 29 September 2025, the station opened.

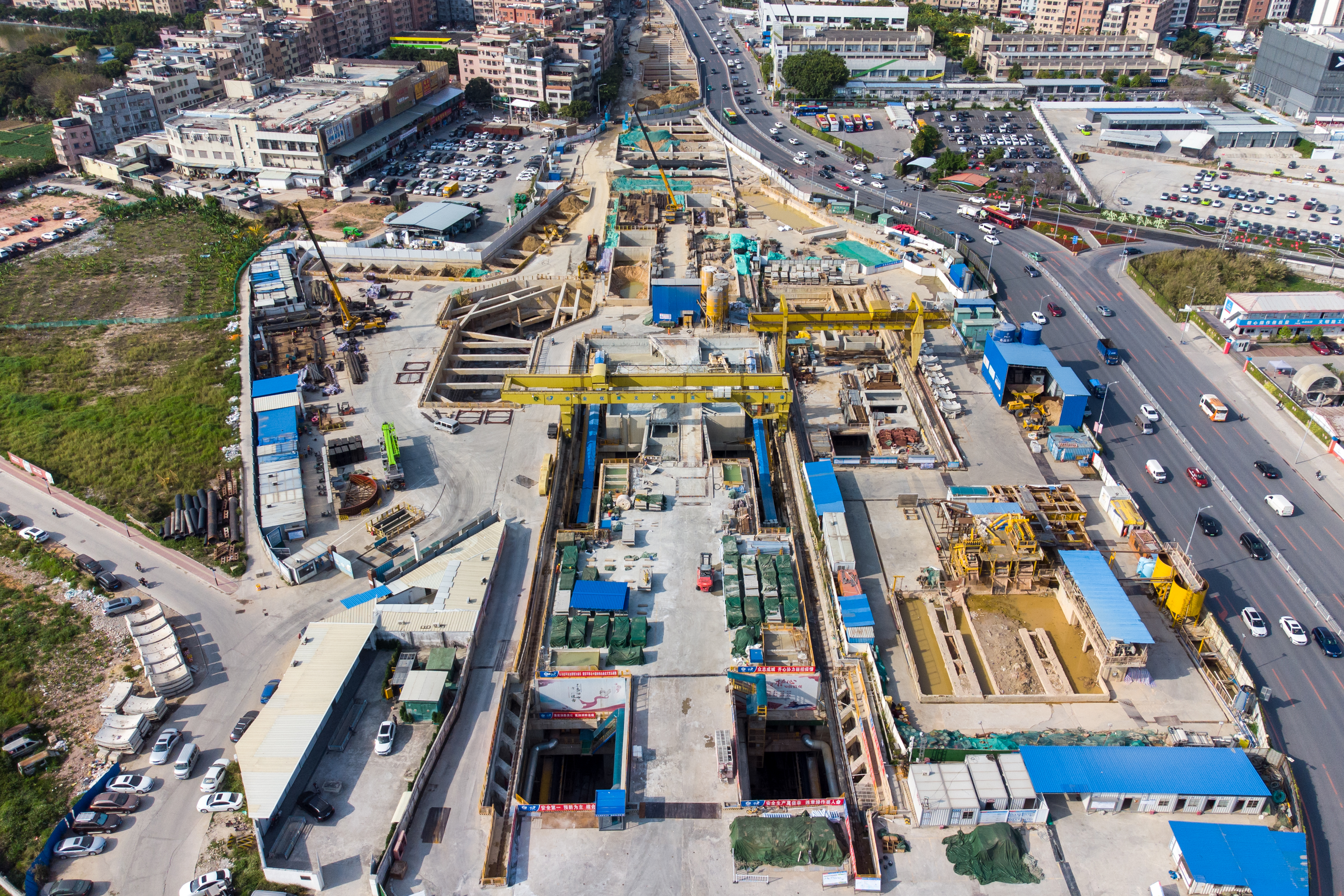
Construction site (March 2022)

== Gallery ==
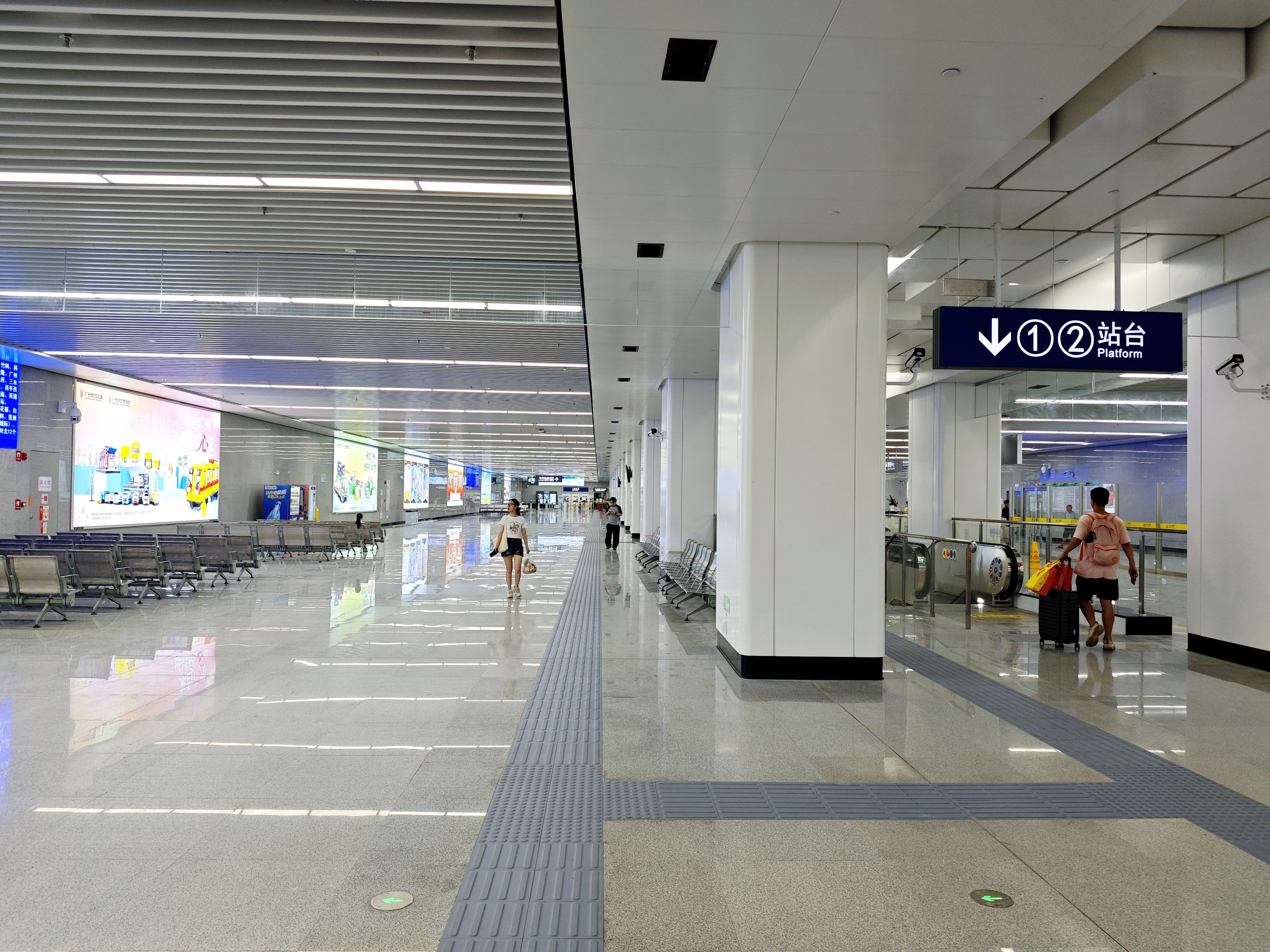
Concourse

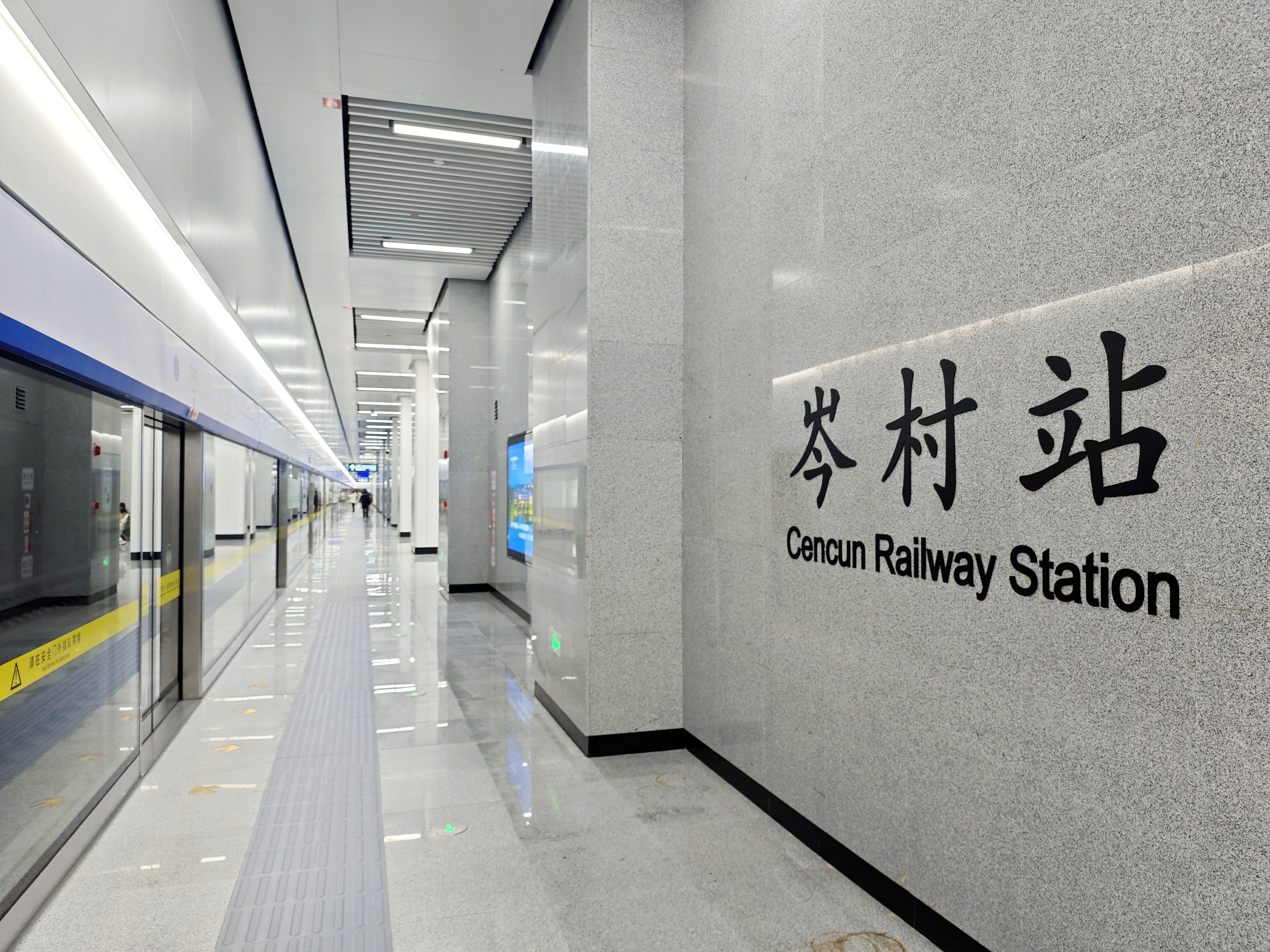
Platform 1

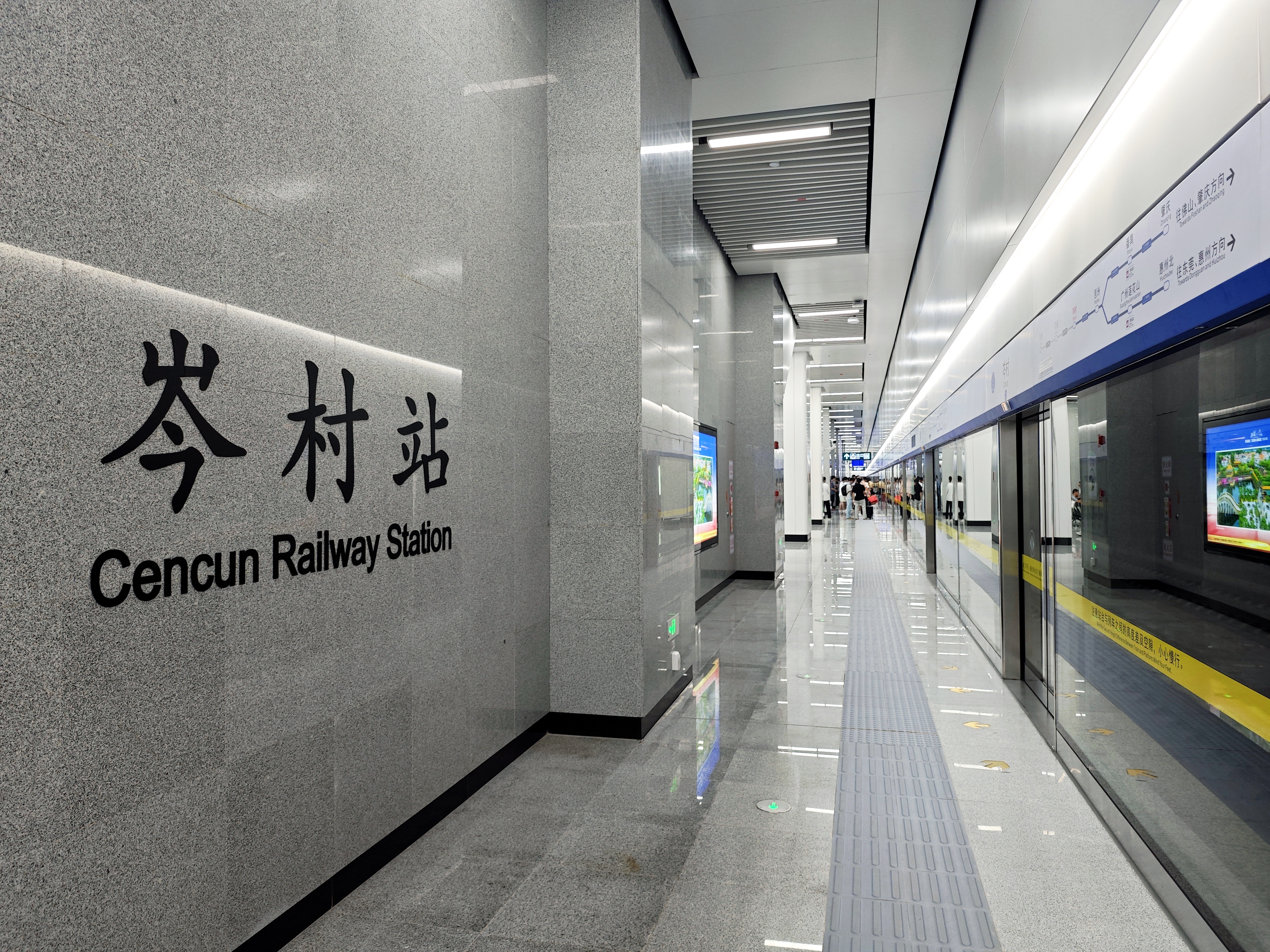
Platform 2
