= Mali station =

Metro station in Guangzhou, China

Mali 马沥
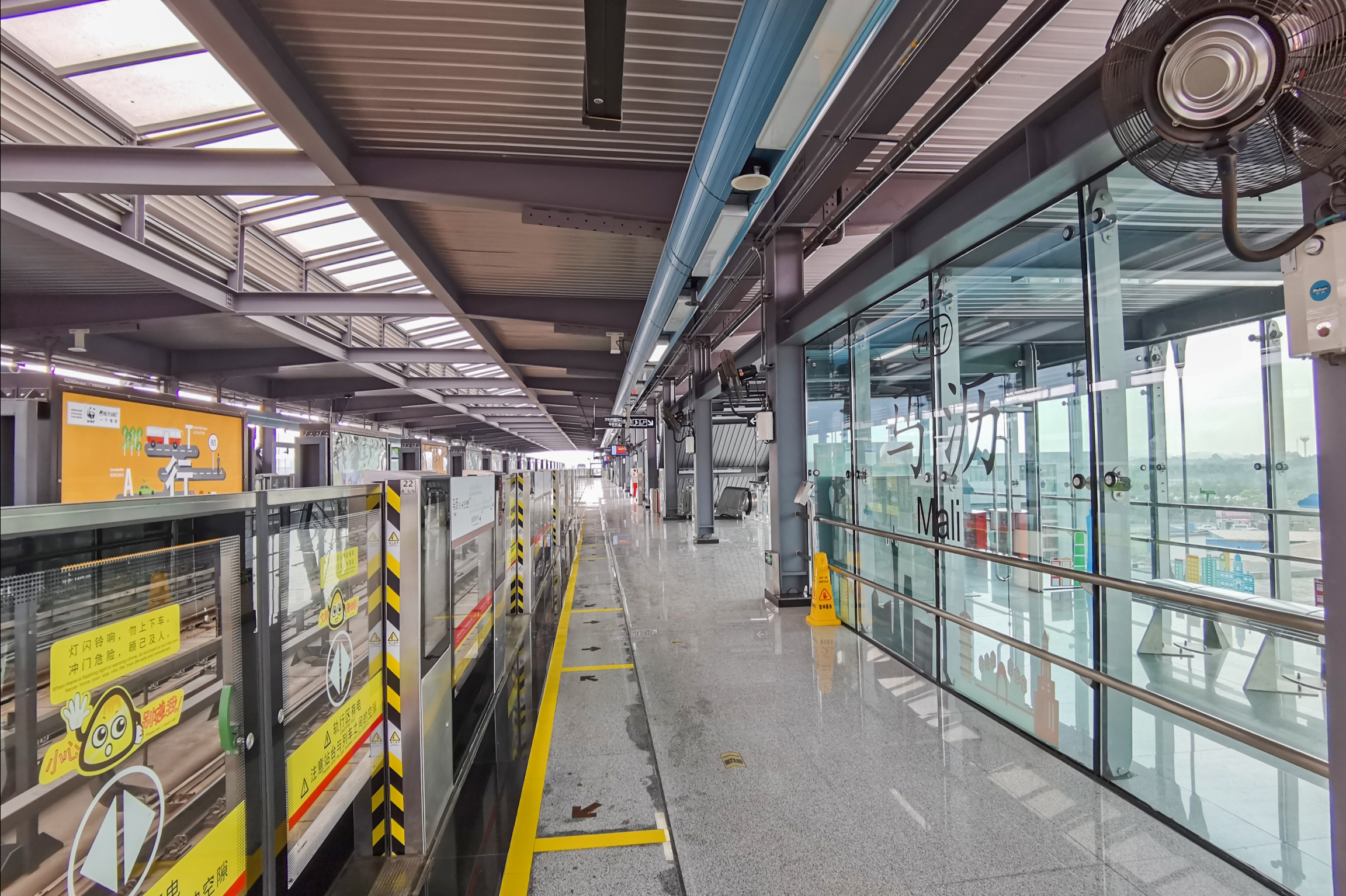
- Platform 2

Chinese name
- Simplified Chinese: 马沥站
- Traditional Chinese: 馬瀝站
Transcriptions

General information
- Location: 9th Guangcong Road (G105); Baiyun District, Guangzhou, Guangdong; China
- Coordinates: 23°24′N 113°27′E
- Operated by: Guangzhou Metro Co. Ltd.
- Line: Line 14
- Platforms: 2 (2 side platforms)
- Tracks: 2

Construction
- Structure type: Elevated
- Accessible: Yes

Other information
- Station code: 1415

History
- Opened: 28 December 2018; 7 years ago

Services
Preceding station	Guangzhou Metro	Following station
Zhongluotan towards Lejia Road	Line 14	Xinhe towards Dongfeng
Location

Mali station (simplified Chinese: 马沥站; traditional Chinese: 馬瀝站) is an elevated station of Line 14 of the Guangzhou Metro. It started operations on 28 December 2018.

The station has 2 elevated side platforms. Platform 1 is for trains heading to Dongfeng, whilst platform 2 is for trains heading to Lejia Road.

== Exits ==
There are 2 exits, lettered A and B. Both exits are accessible and are located on Guangcong No. 9 Road.

== Gallery ==
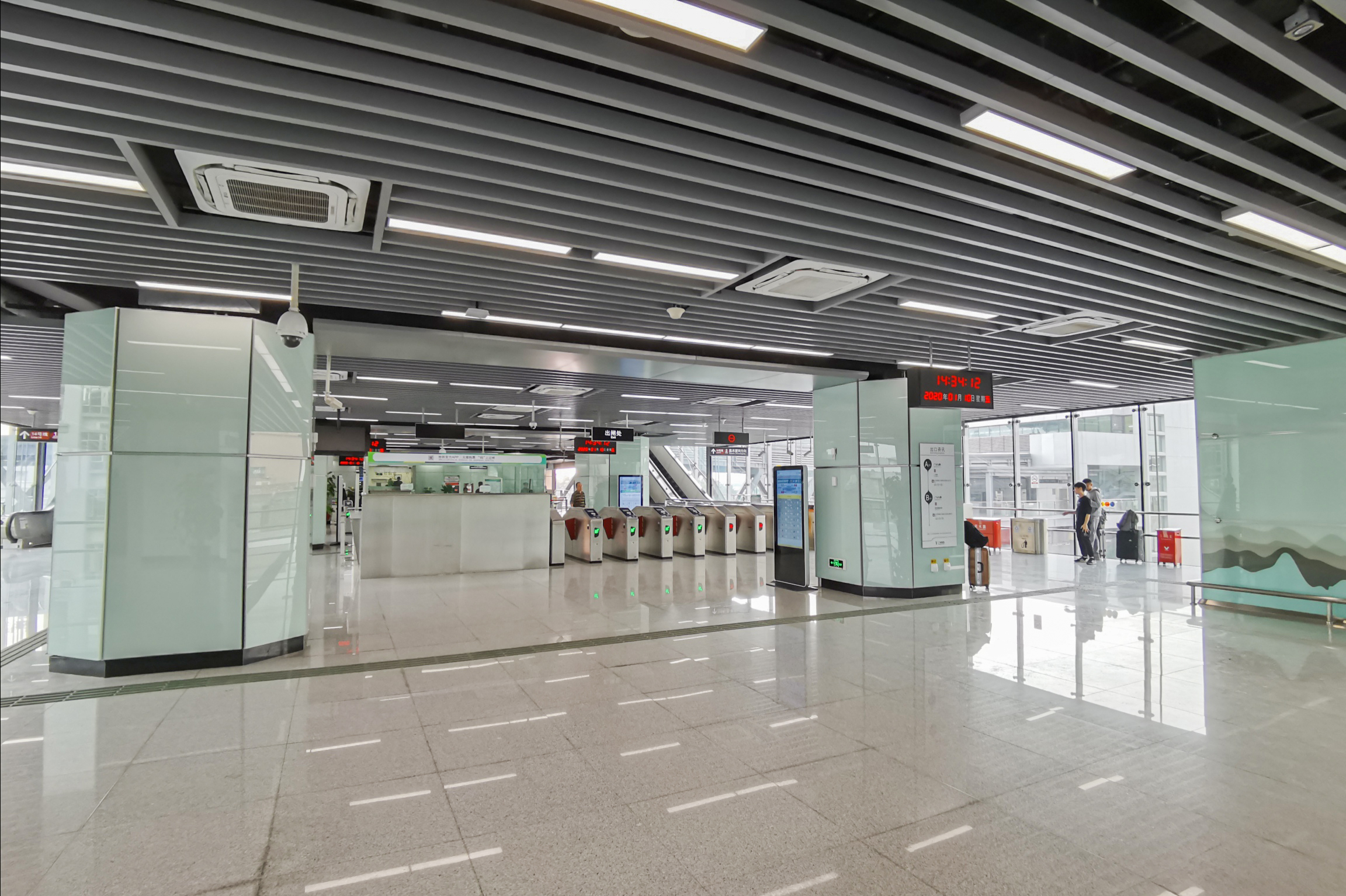
Concourse

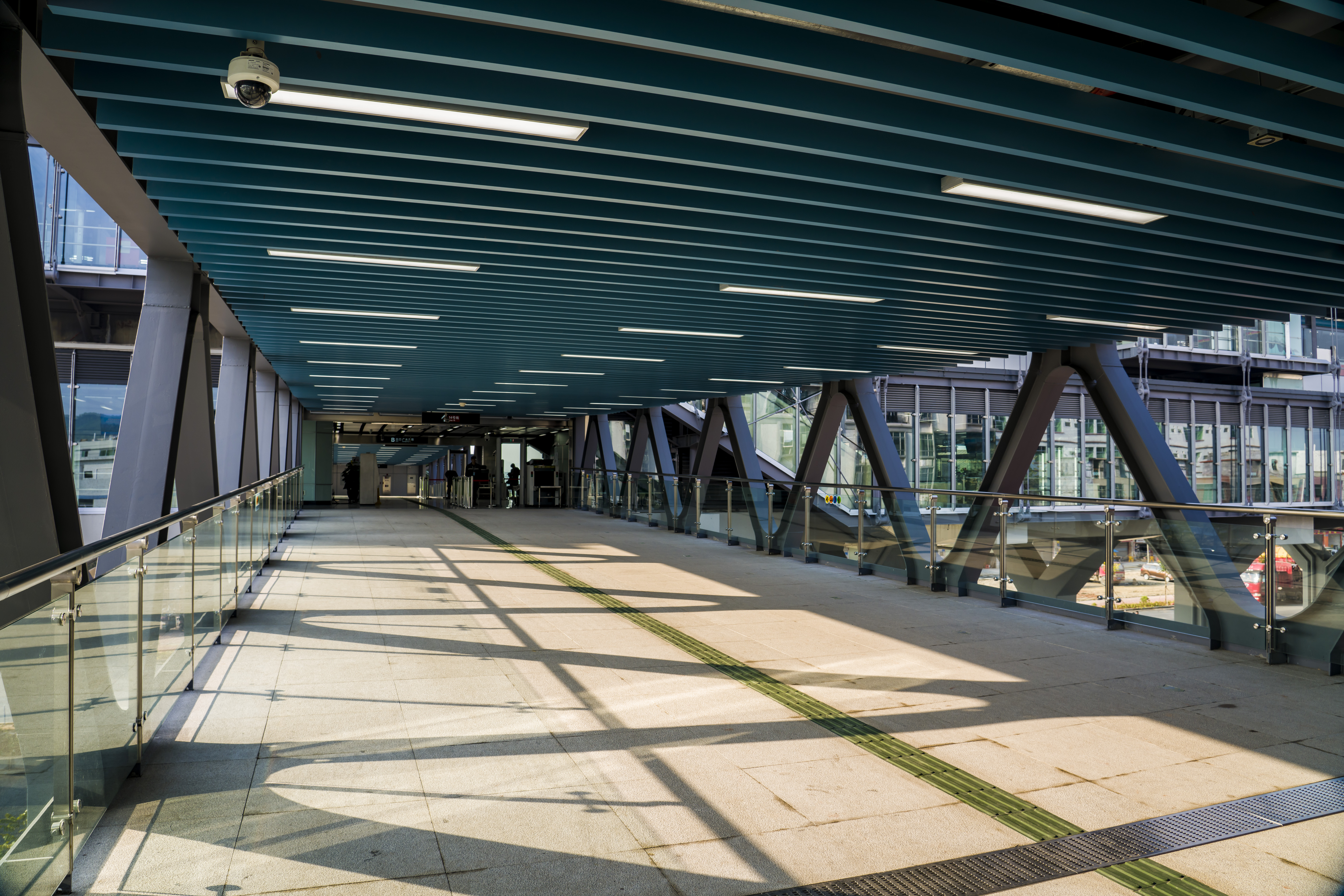
Exit A Passageway

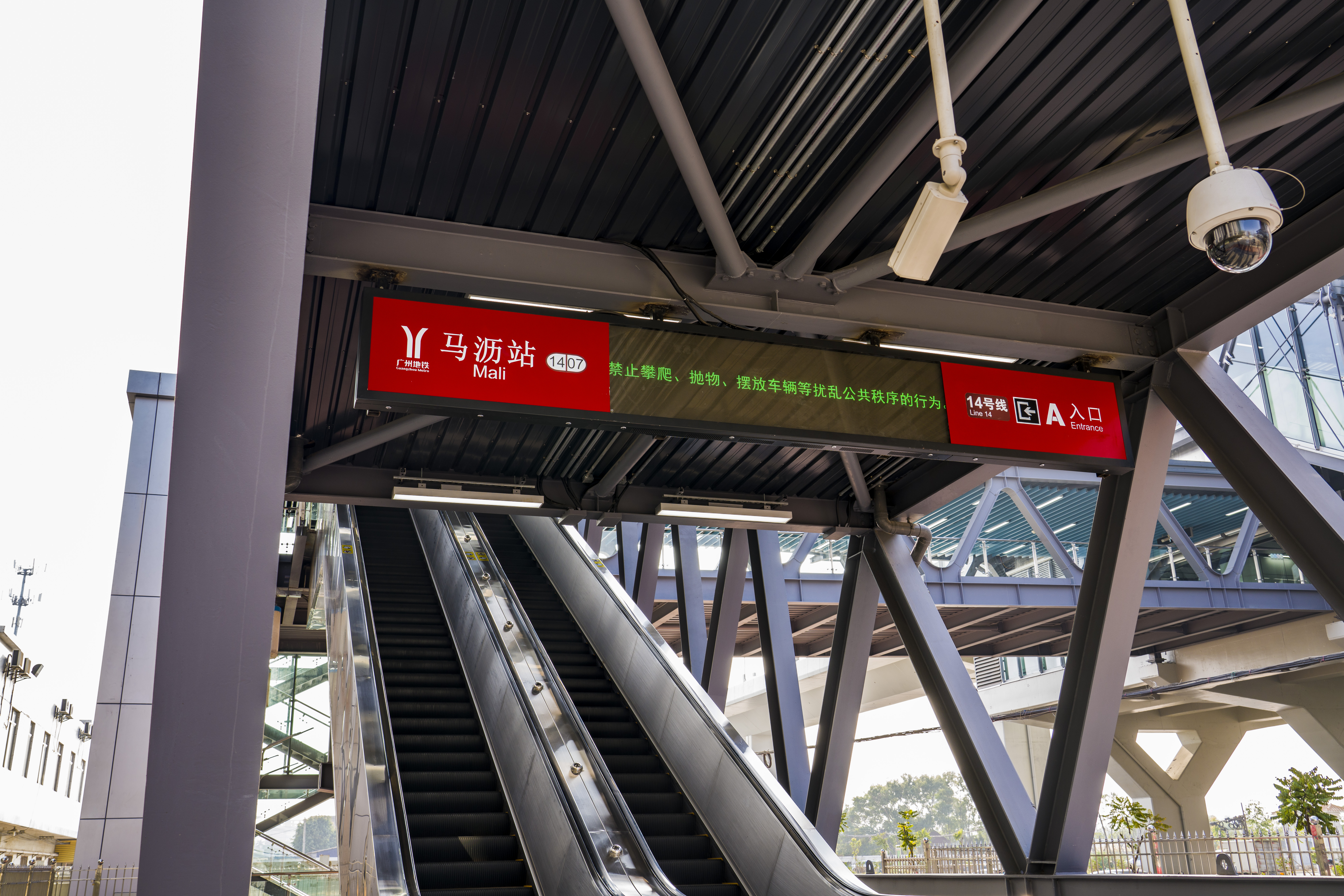
Exit A

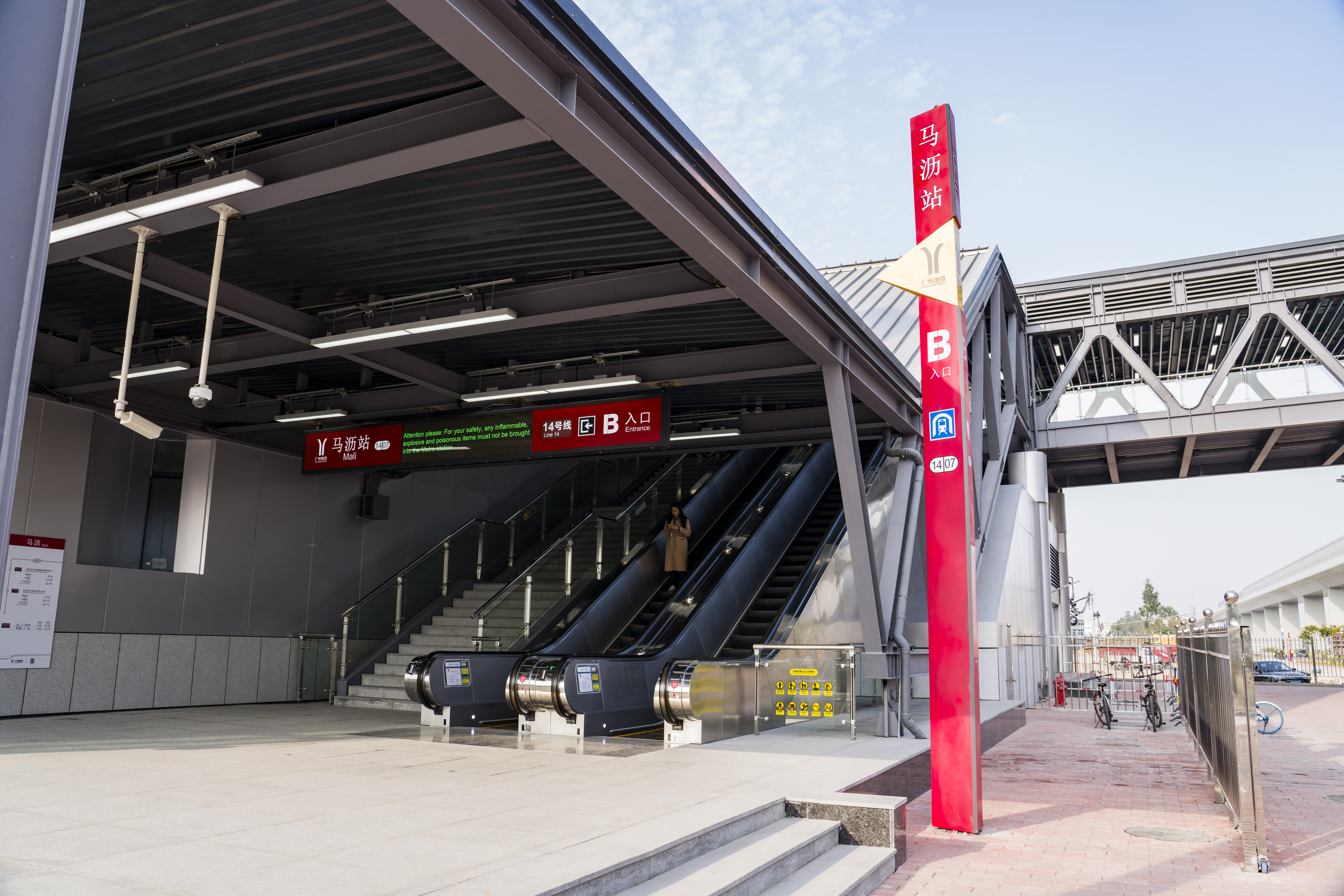
Exit B

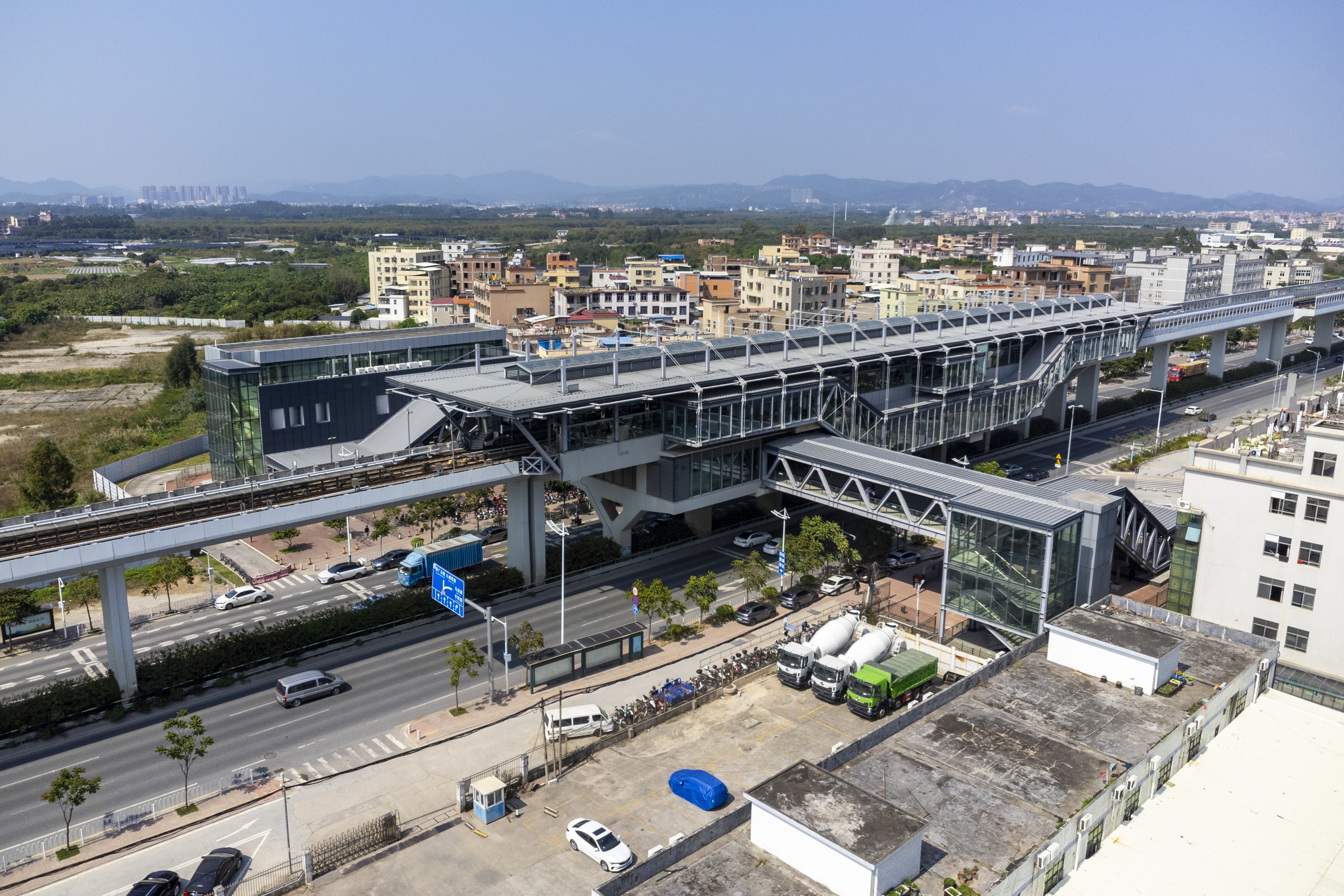
Exterior
