= Zhongluotan station =

Metro station in Guangzhou, China

Zhongluotan 钟落潭
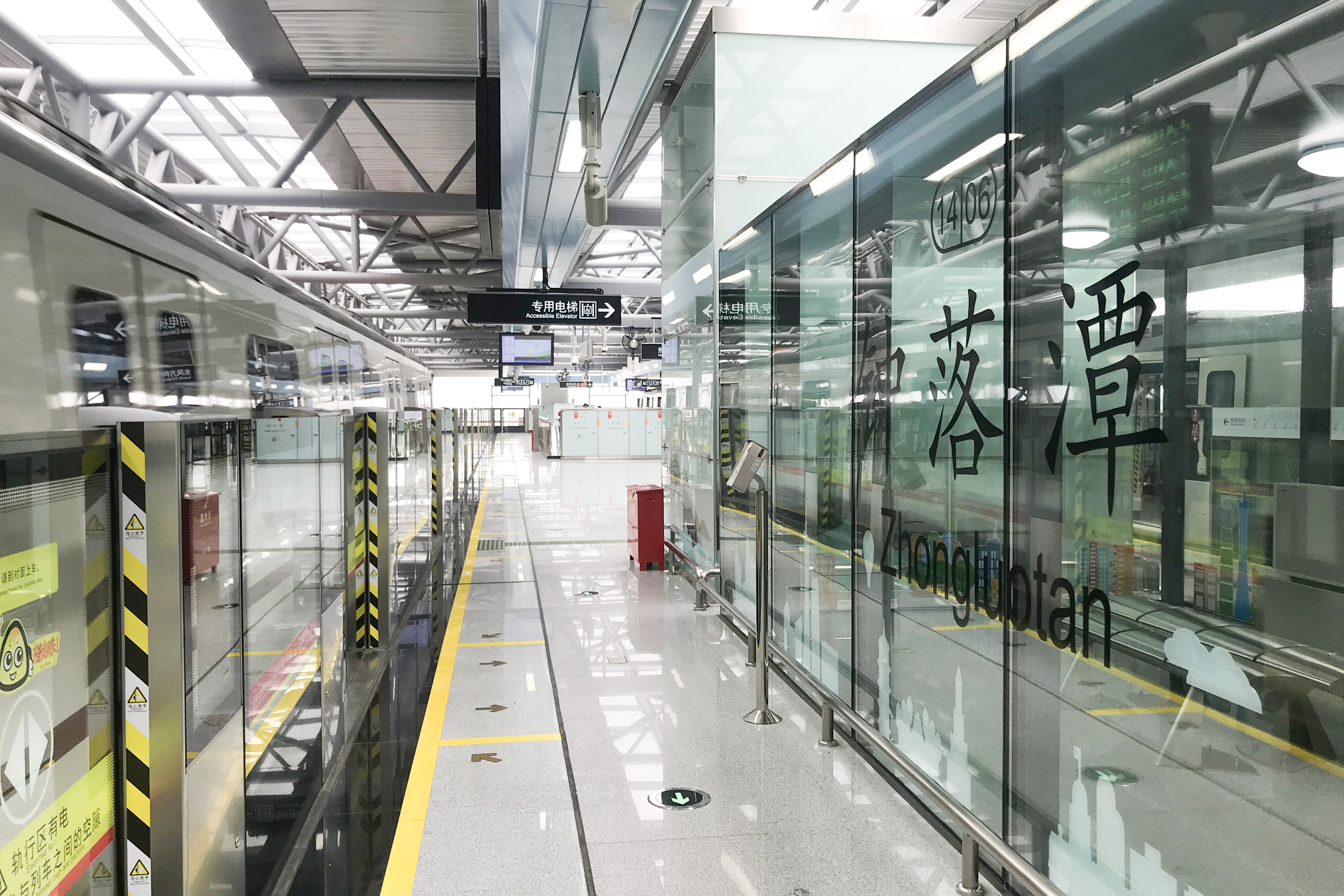
- Platform 2

Chinese name
- Simplified Chinese: 钟落潭站
- Traditional Chinese: 鐘落潭站
Transcriptions

General information
- Location: Guangcong Highway (G105), Guanglong Road, Baiyun District, Guangzhou, Guangdong; China
- Coordinates: 23.377953°N 113.395106°E
- Operated by: Guangzhou Metro Co. Ltd.
- Line: Line 14
- Platforms: 4 (2 island platforms)
- Tracks: 4

Construction
- Structure type: Elevated
- Accessible: Yes

Other information
- Station code: 1414

History
- Opened: 28 December 2018; 7 years ago

Services
Preceding station	Guangzhou Metro	Following station
Zhuliao towards Lejia Road	Line 14	Mali towards Dongfeng
Location

Zhongluotan station (Chinese: 钟落潭站) is an elevated station of Line 14 of the Guangzhou Metro. It started operations on 28 December 2018.

The station has 2 elevated island platforms. Trains usually stop at the outer 2 platforms, with the express trains passing through the middle tracks. Platforms 1 & 3 are for trains heading to Dongfeng, whilst platforms 2 & 4 are for trains heading to Lejia Road.

== Exits ==
There are 3 exits, lettered A, B1 & B2. Exits A & B1 are accessible. All exits are located on Guangcong No. 7 Road.

== Gallery ==
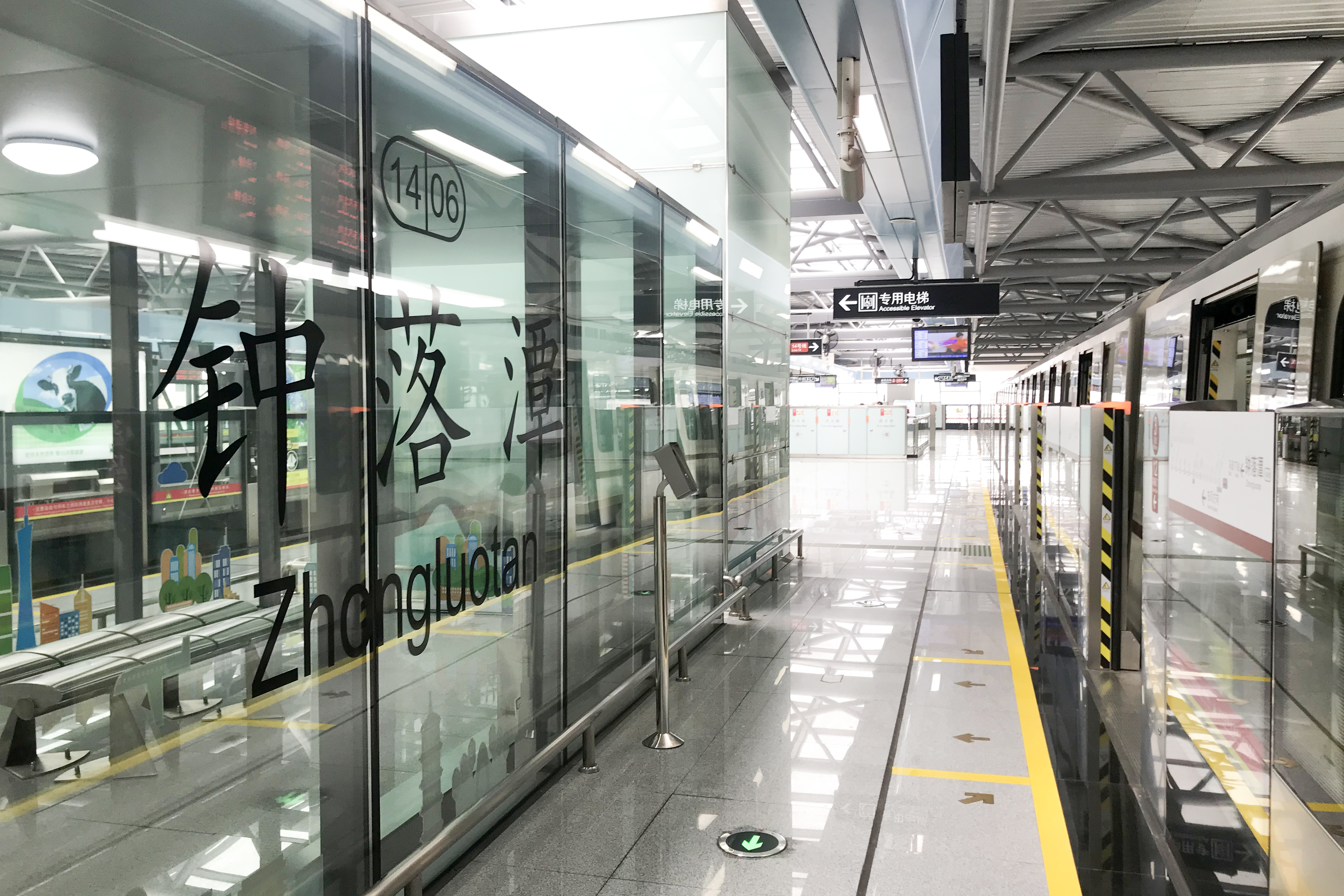
Platform 1

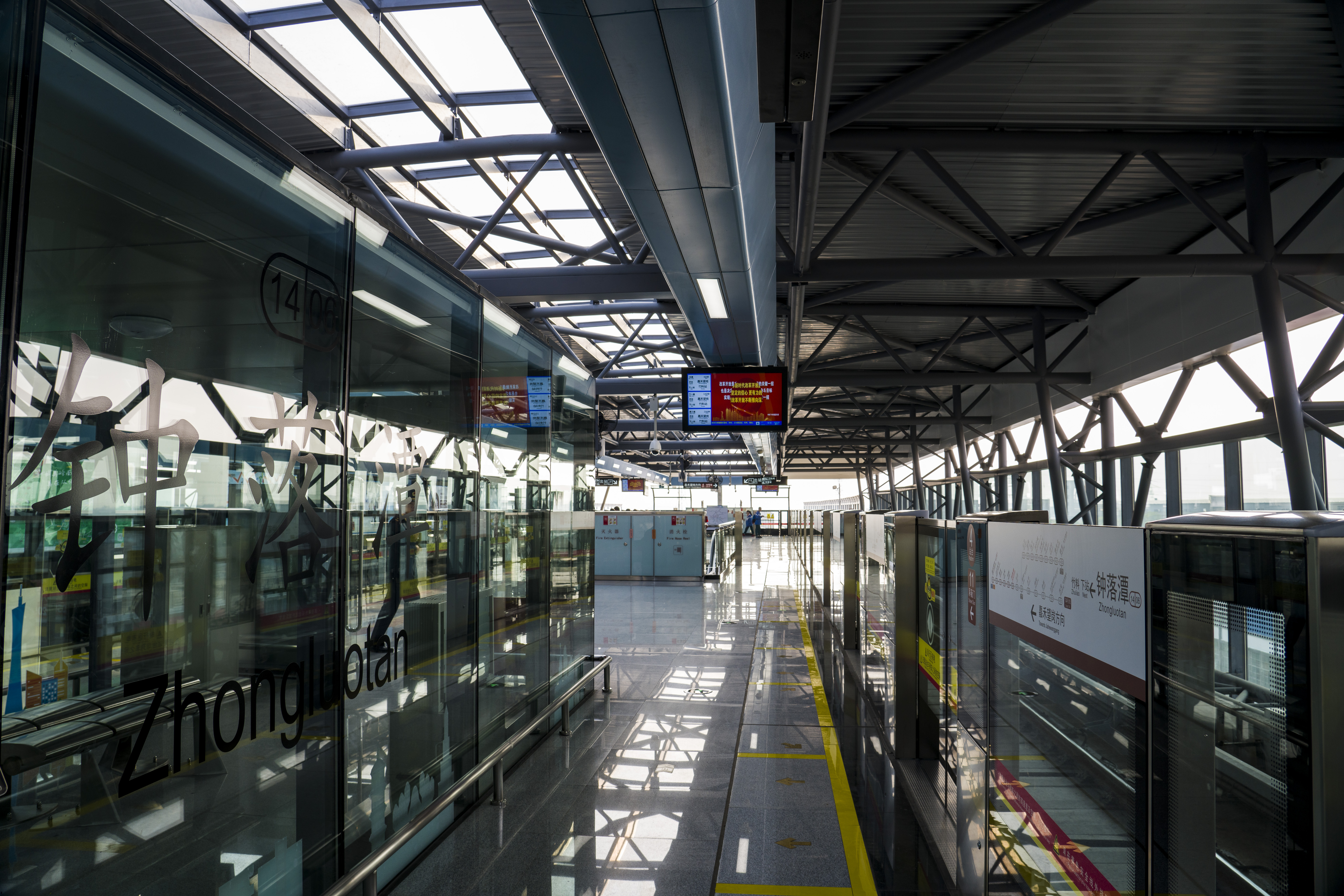
Platform 4

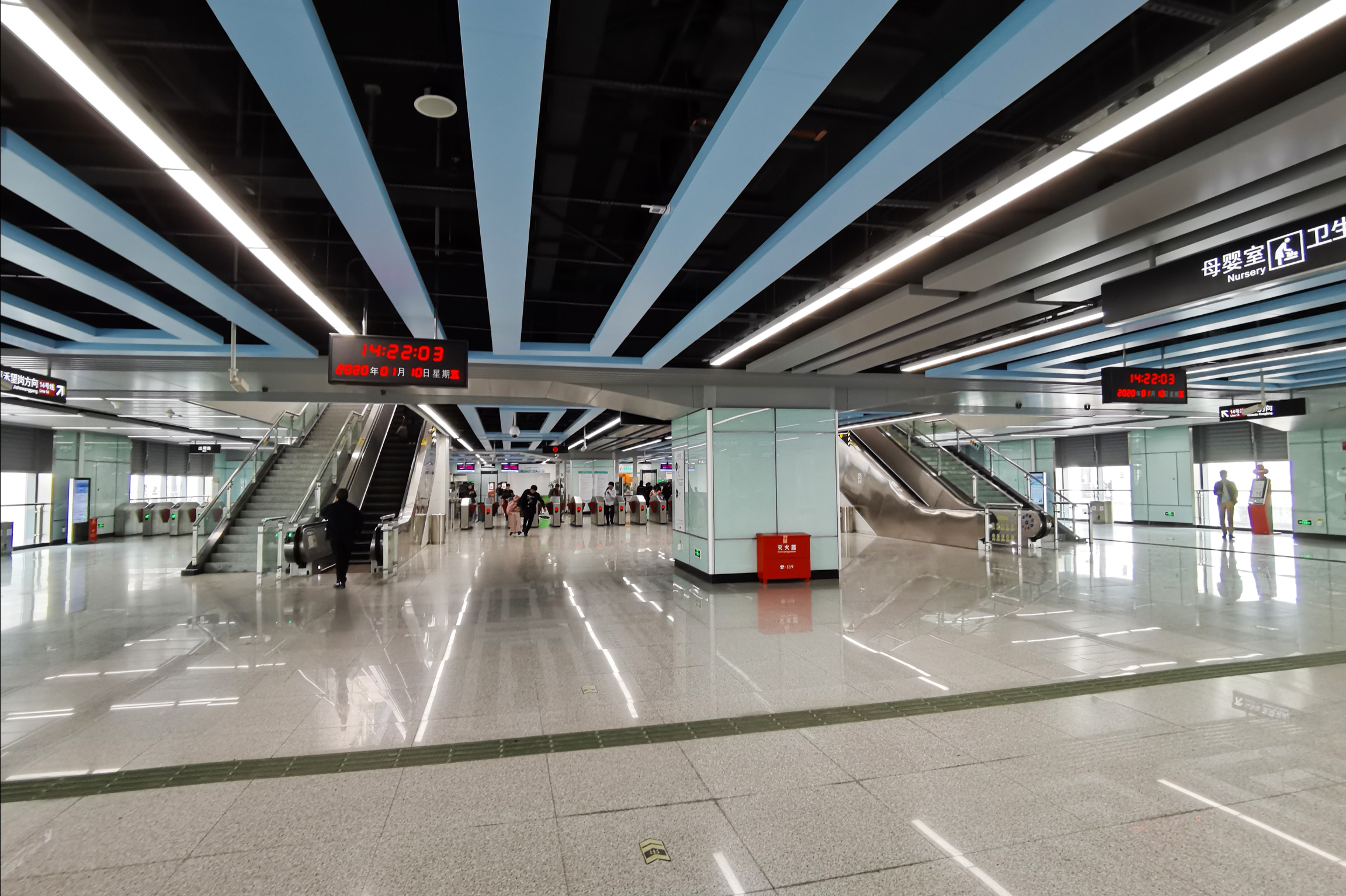
Concourse

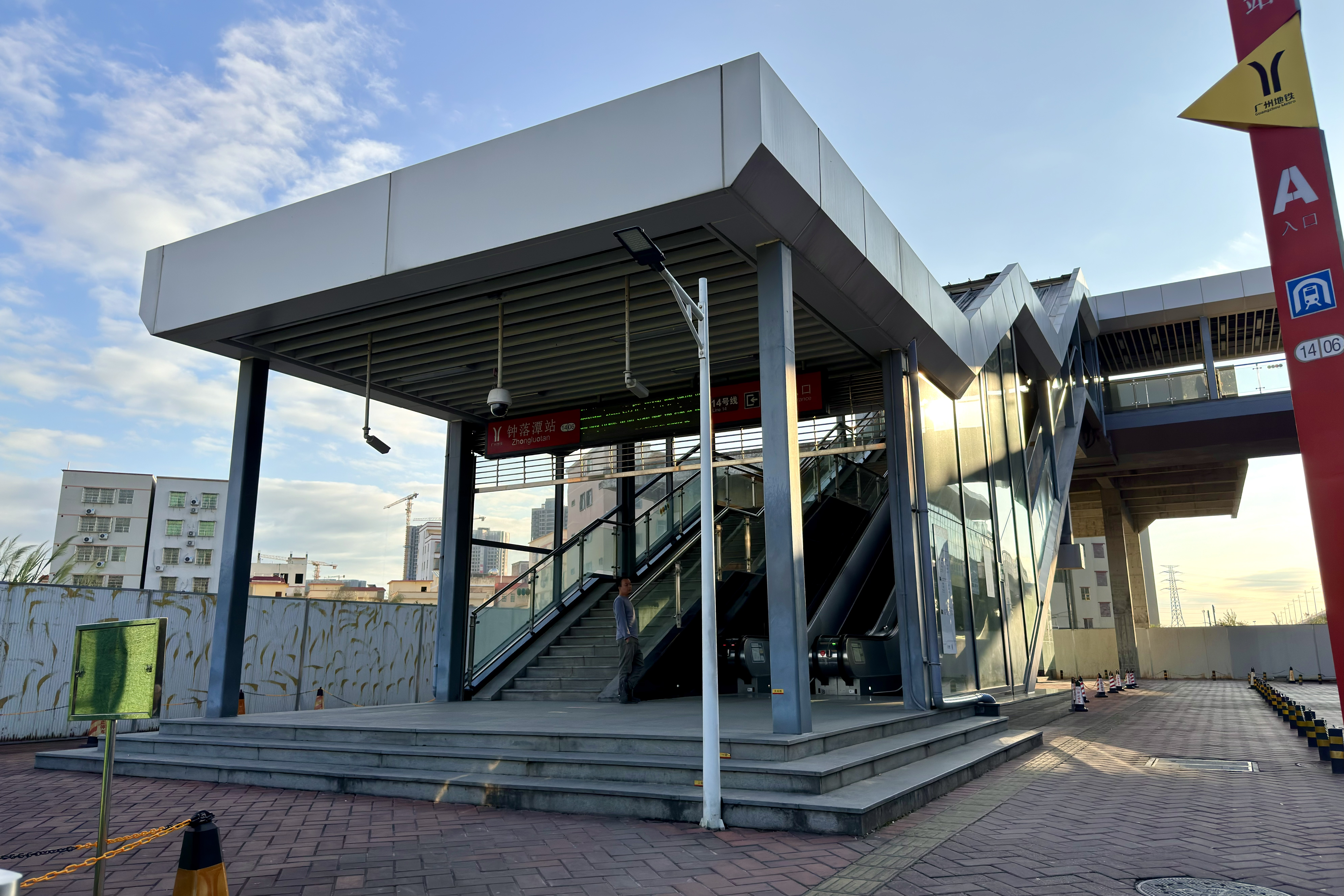
Exit A

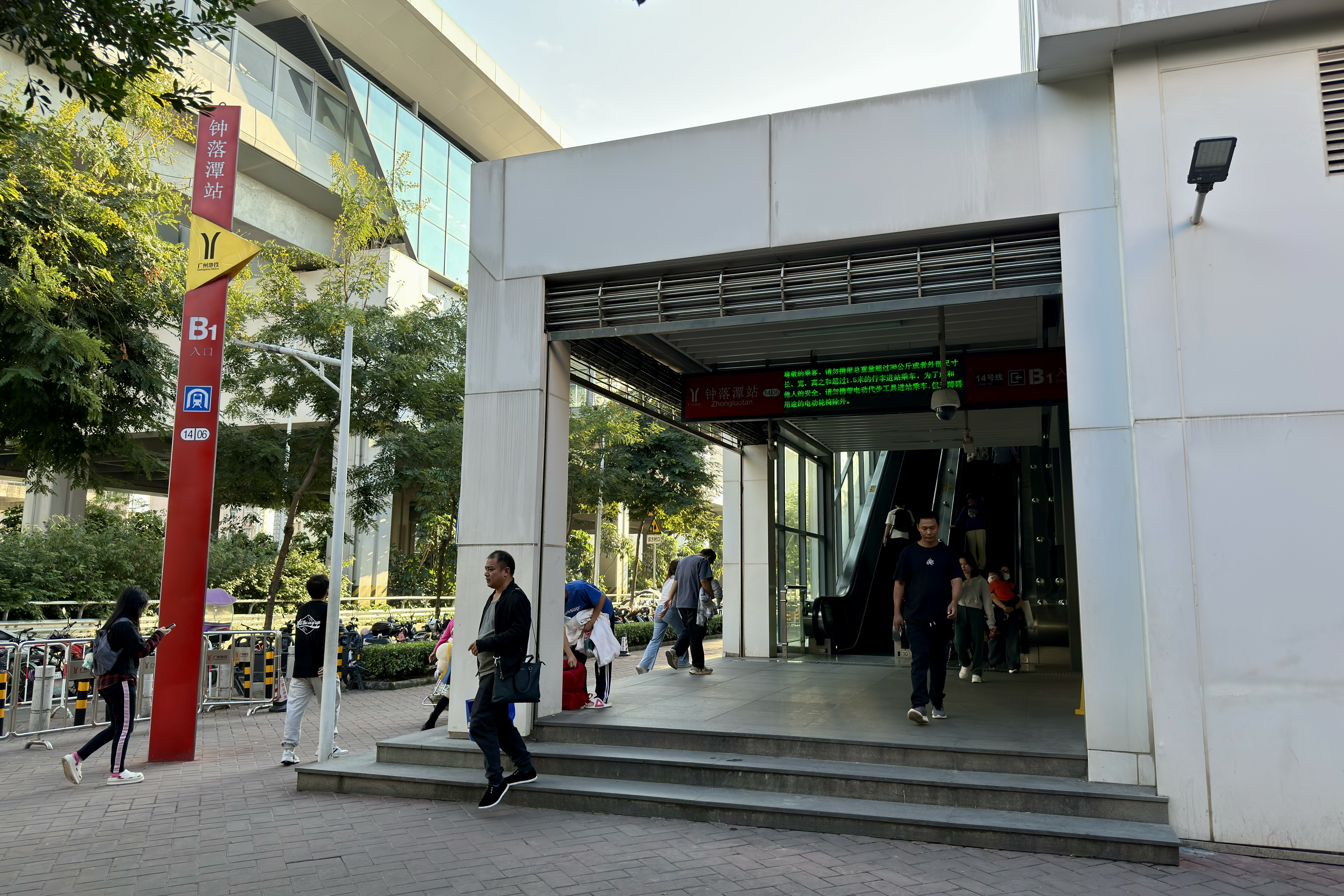
Exit B1

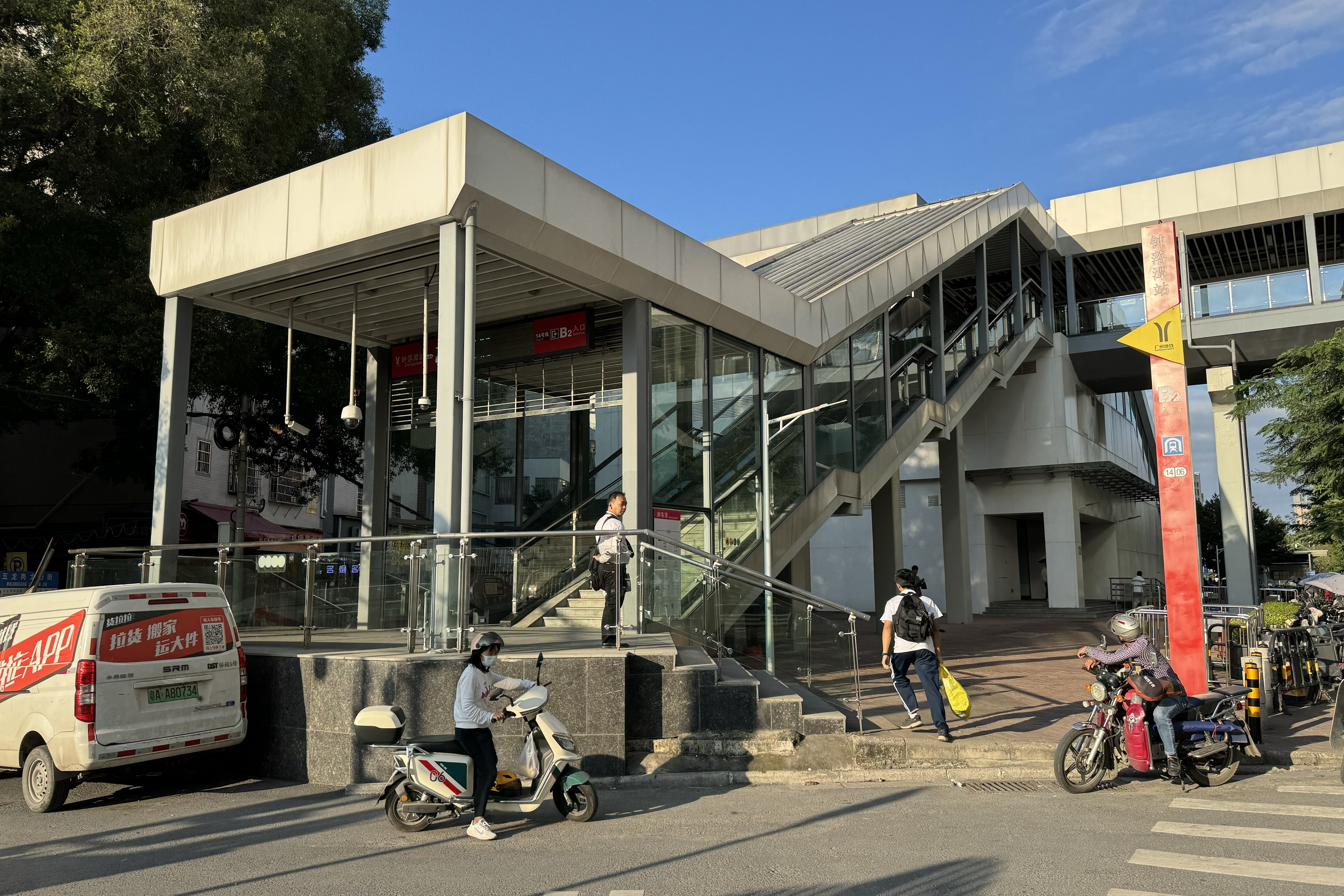
Exit B2

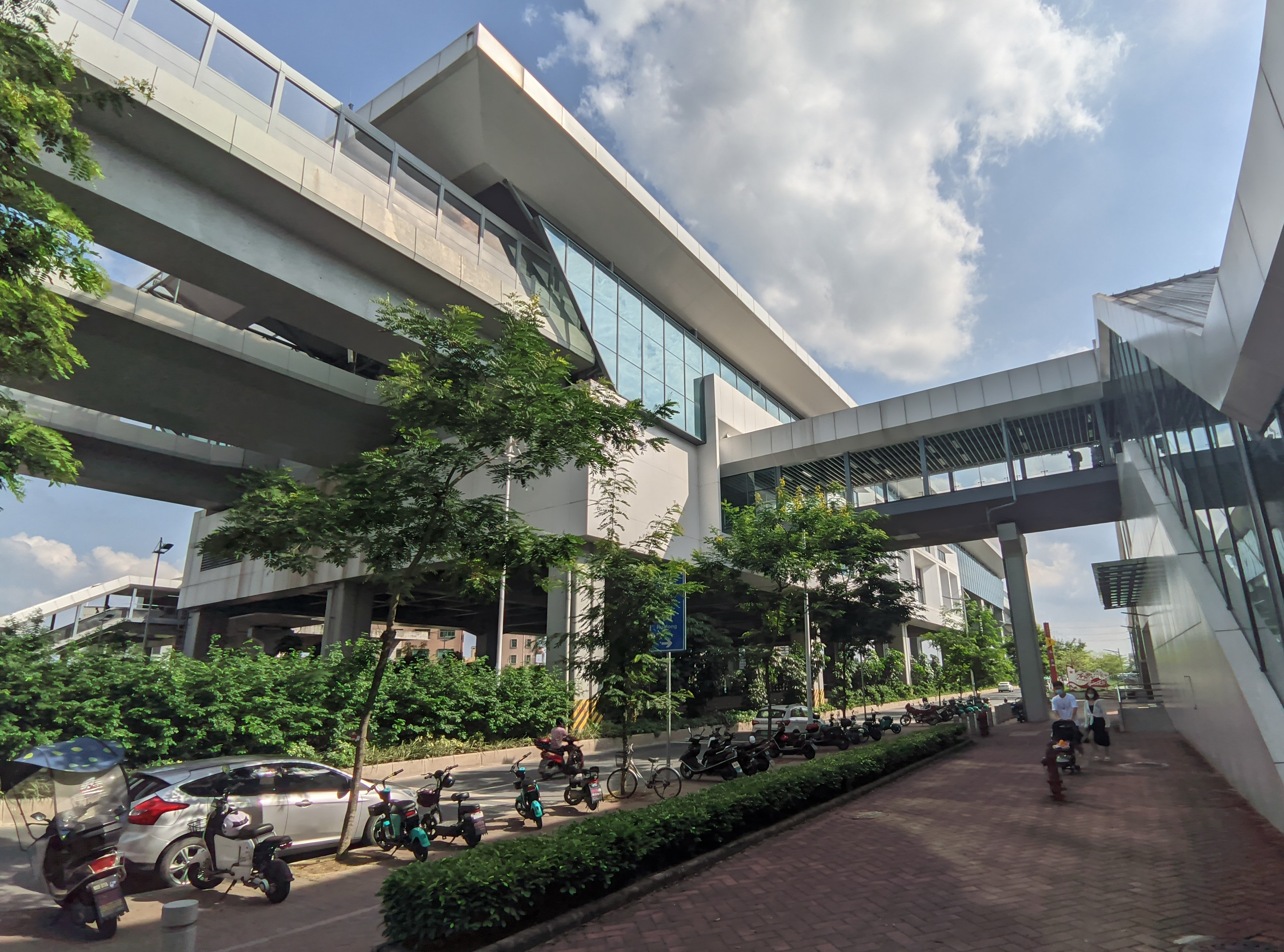
Exterior
