= Xinhe station (Guangzhou Metro) =

Guangzhou Metro station

Coordinates: 23°24′48″N 113°28′01″E

Xinhe 新和
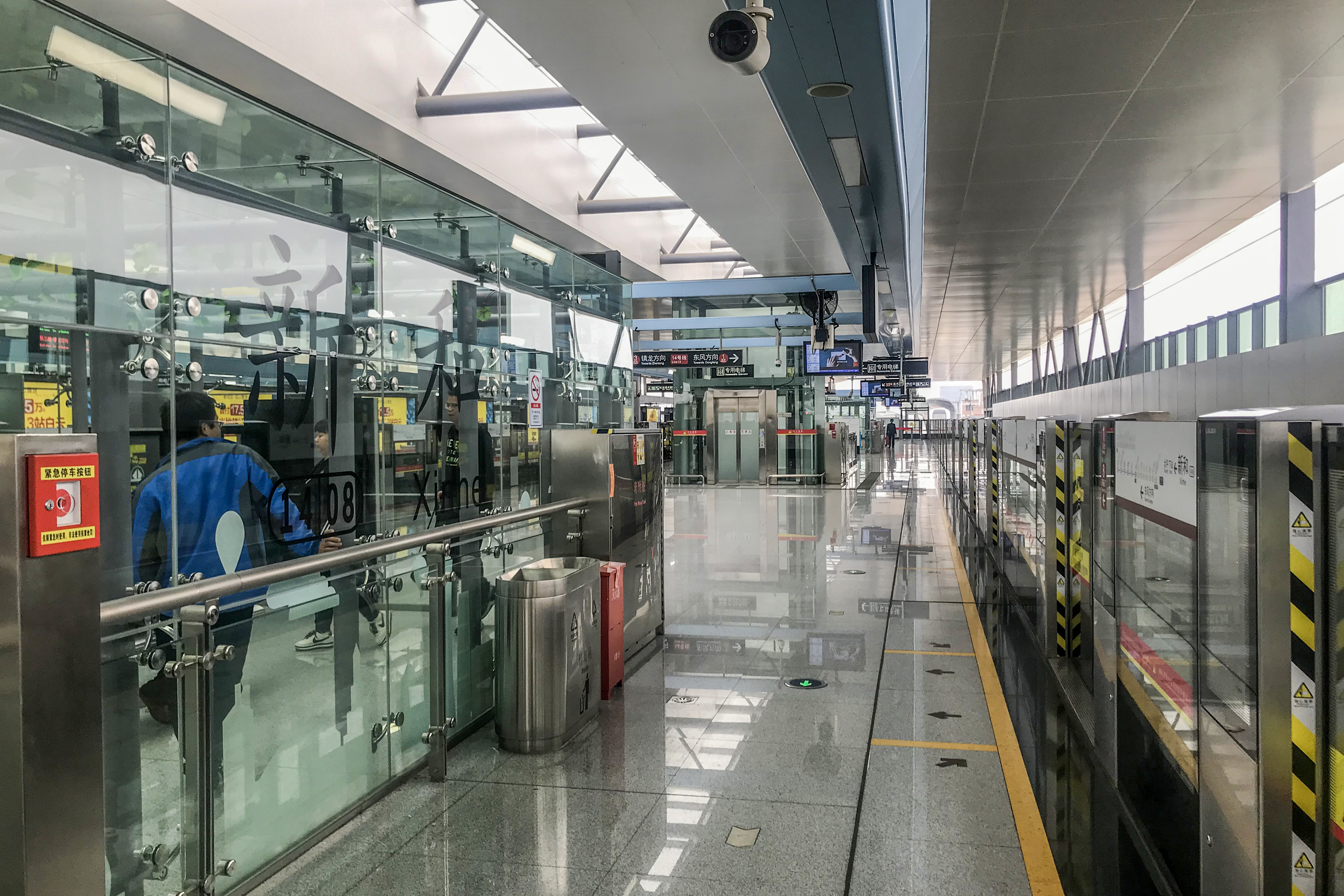
- Platform 1 (towards Dongfeng)

Chinese name
- Chinese: 新和站
Transcriptions
Standard Mandarin
- Hanyu Pinyin: Xīnhé Zhàn
Yue: Cantonese
- Jyutping: San^{1}wo^{4} Zaam^{6}
- Hong Kong Romanization: San Wo station

General information
- Location: Guangcong No. 9 Road (G105); Baiyun District, Guangzhou, Guangdong; China
- Operator: Guangzhou Metro Co. Ltd.
- Line: Line 14
- Platforms: 4 (2 island platforms)
- Tracks: 4

Construction
- Structure type: Elevated
- Accessible: Yes

Other information
- Station code: 1416

History
- Opened: 28 December 2017 (8 years ago)

Services
Preceding station	Guangzhou Metro	Following station
Mali towards Lejia Road	Line 14 Mainline	Taiping towards Dongfeng
Zhuliao towards Lejia Road	Line 14 Mainline express	Conghua Coach Terminal towards Dongfeng
Terminus	Line 14 Branch (Knowledge City Line)	Hongwei towards Zhenlong
Location

Xinhe station (Chinese: 新和站; pinyin: Xīnhé Zhàn; Jyutping: San^{1}wo^{4} Zaam^{6}) is an elevated station of Line 14 of the Guangzhou Metro. It is also the northwestern terminus of Line 14's Knowledge City branch line. It started operations on 28 December 2017.

== Station layout ==
F3; Platforms	Platform 2	14 towards Lejia Road (Mali / express: Zhuliao)
F3; Platforms	Island platform, doors will open on the left (mainline), right (branch)
F3; Platforms	Platform 4	14 termination platform
F3; Platforms	Platform 3	14 towards Zhenlong (Hongwei)
F3; Platforms	Island platform, doors will open on the left (mainline), right (branch)
F3; Platforms	Platform 1	14 towards Dongfeng (Taiping / express: Conghua Coach Terminal)
F2; Concourse	Lobby	Ticket Machines, Customer Service, Shops, Police Station, Safety Facilities, Baby Change, Toilets
G Equipment Area		Station equipment, Exits, Civil equipment

== Exits ==
There are 3 exits, lettered A, B and C. Exits A and C are accessible. All exits are located on Guangcong No. 9 Road.

Exit number	Exit location
Exit A	Guangcong Jiulu
Exit B	Guangcong Jiulu
Exit C	Guangcong Jiulu

== Gallery ==
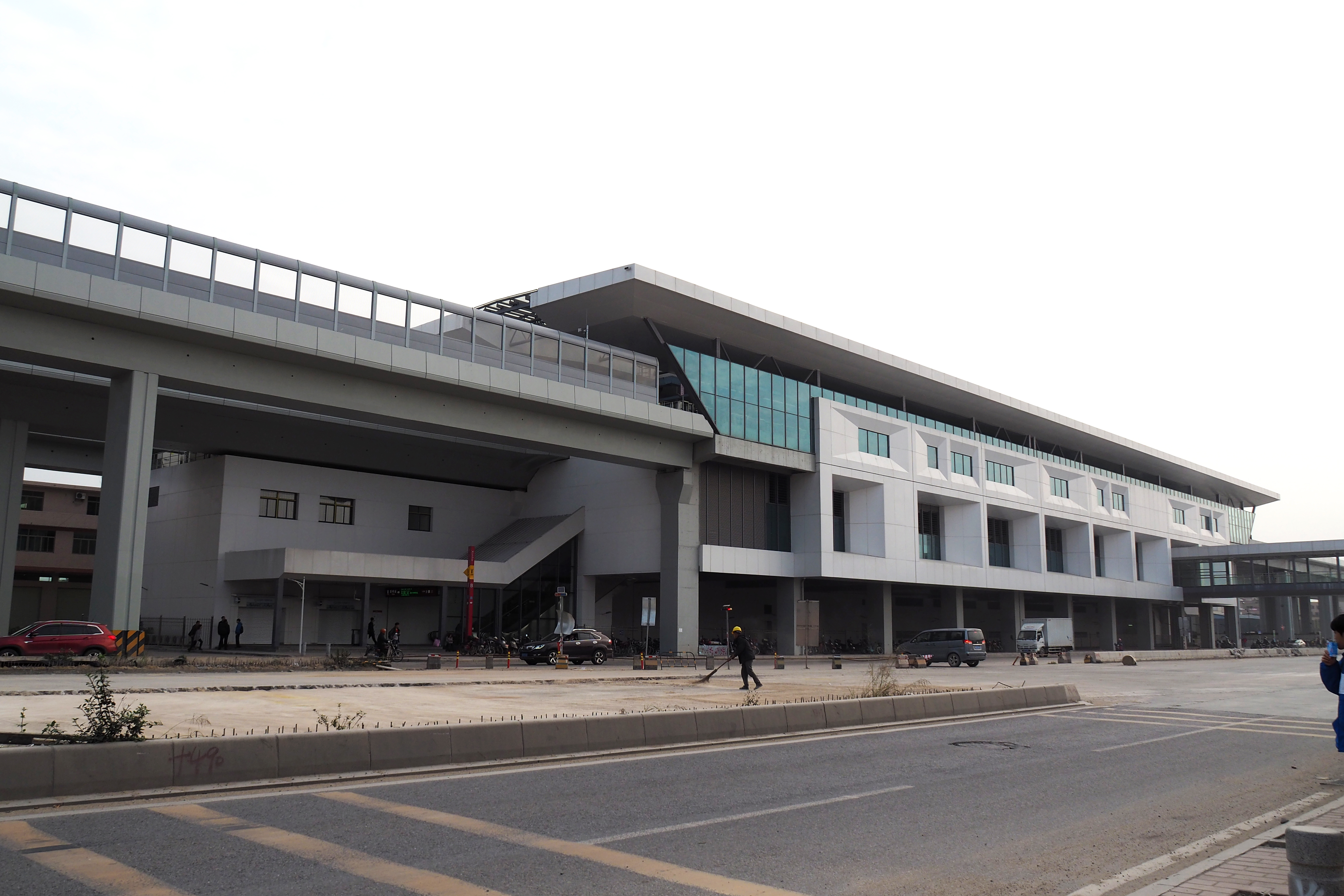
Exterior

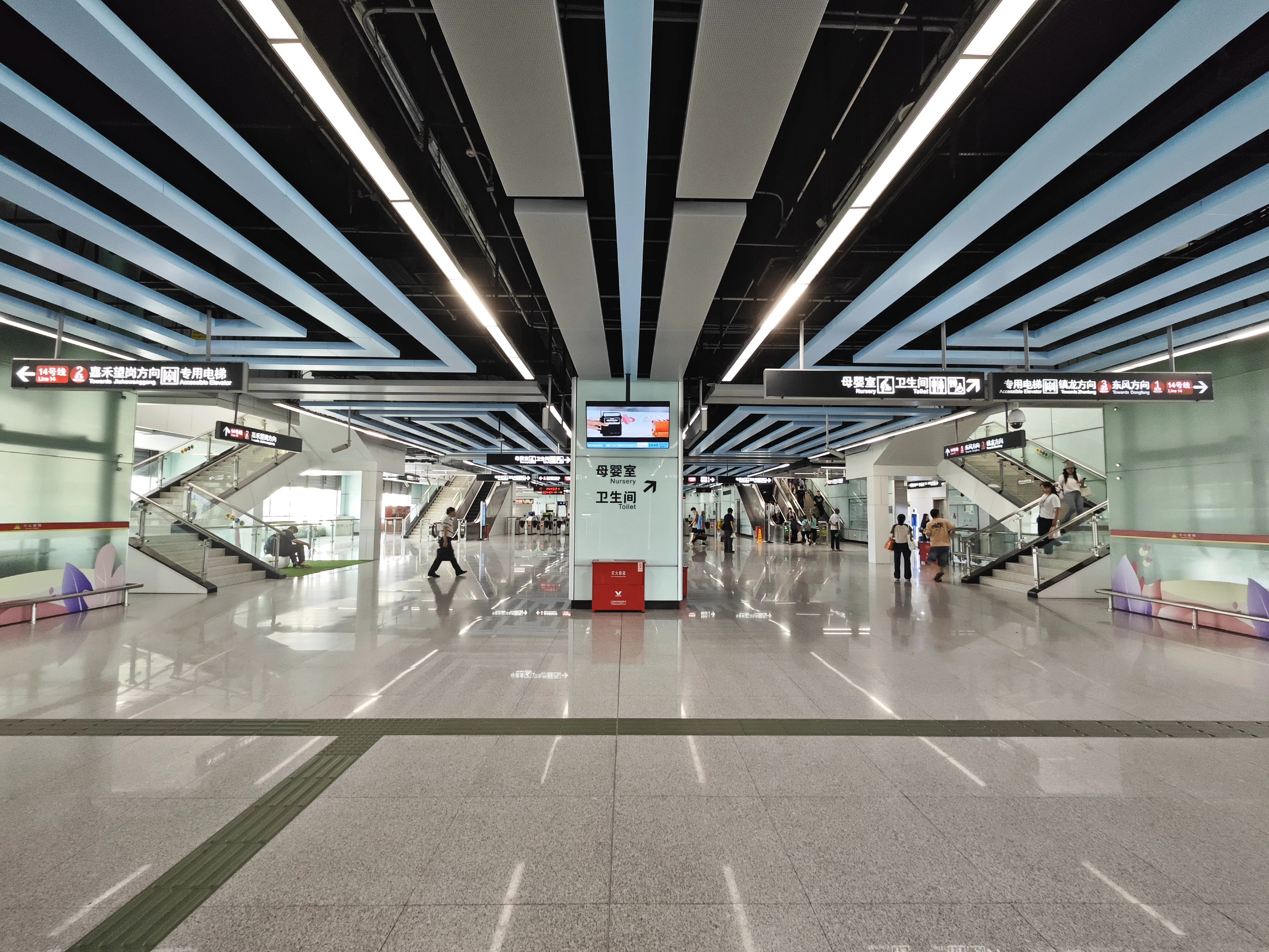
Concourse

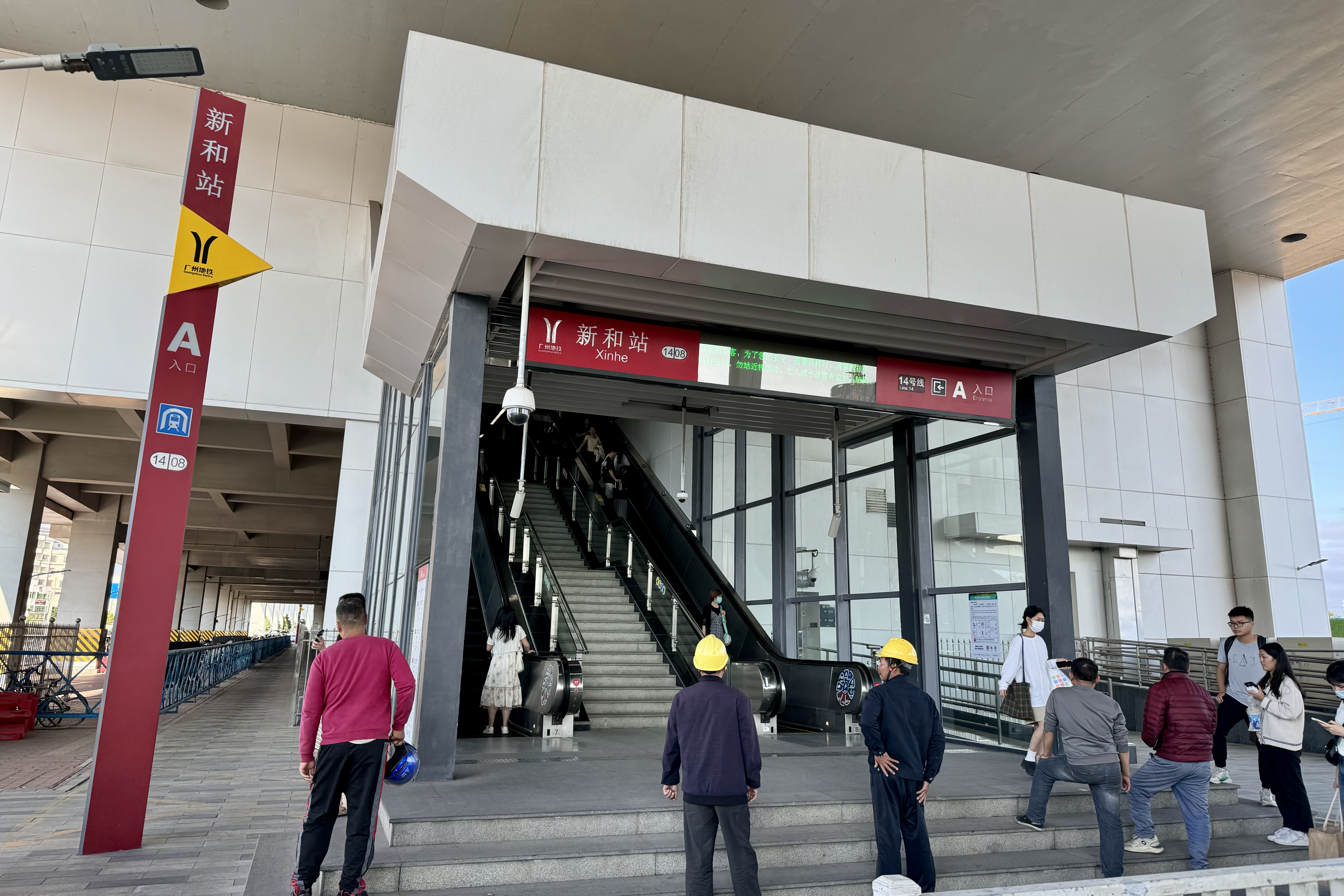
Exit A

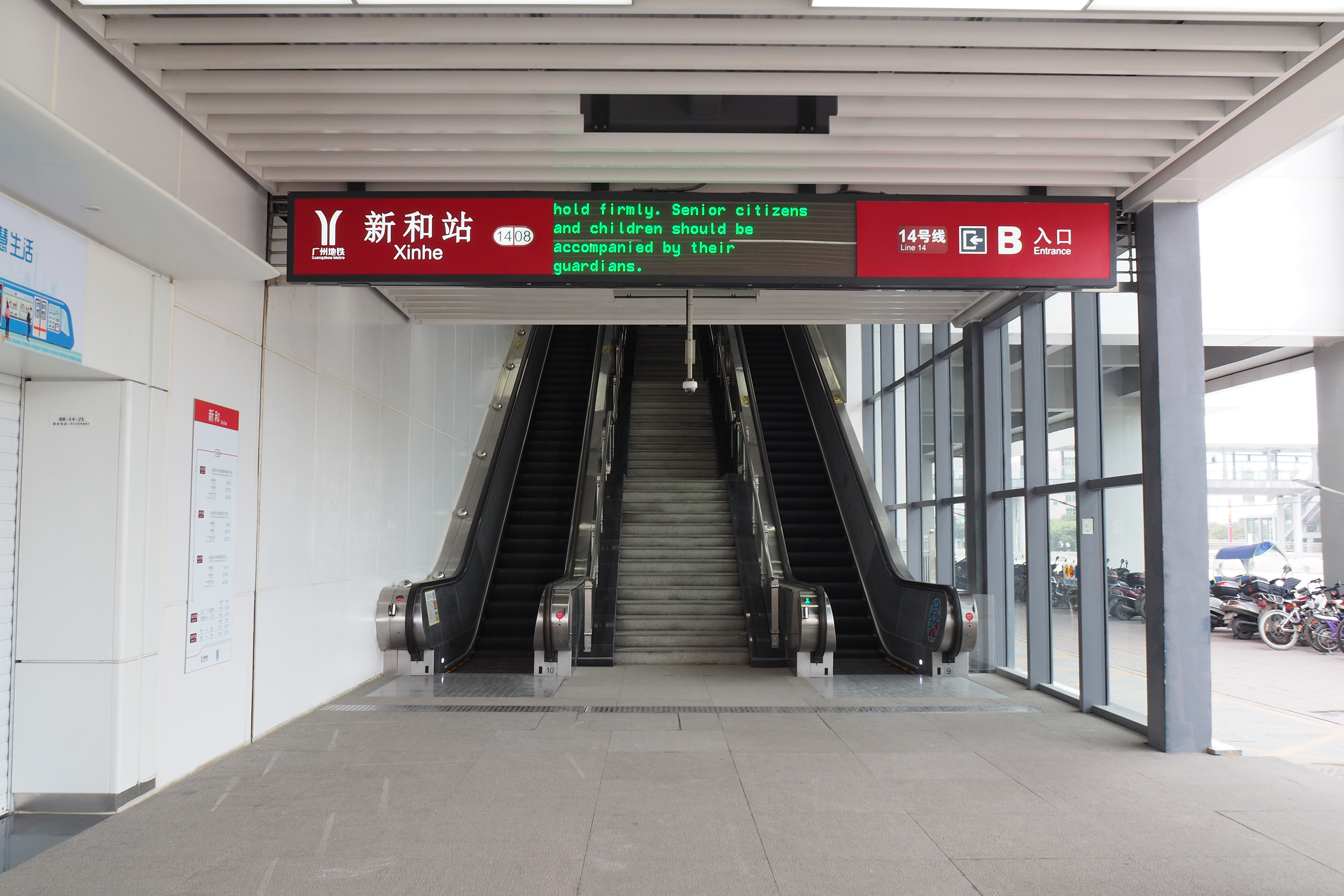
Exit B

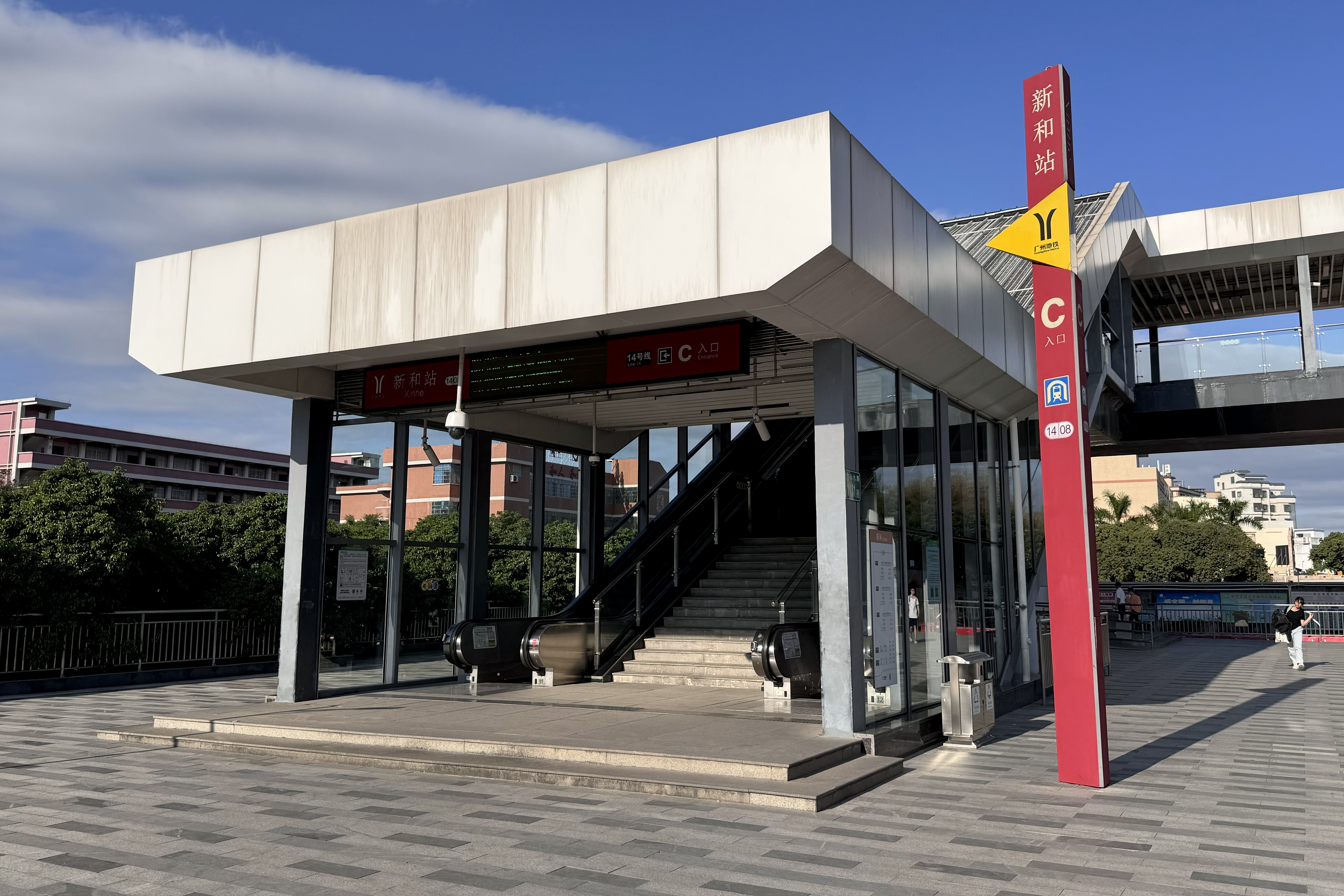
Exit C
