= Line 14 (Guangzhou Metro) =

Line of the Guangzhou Metro

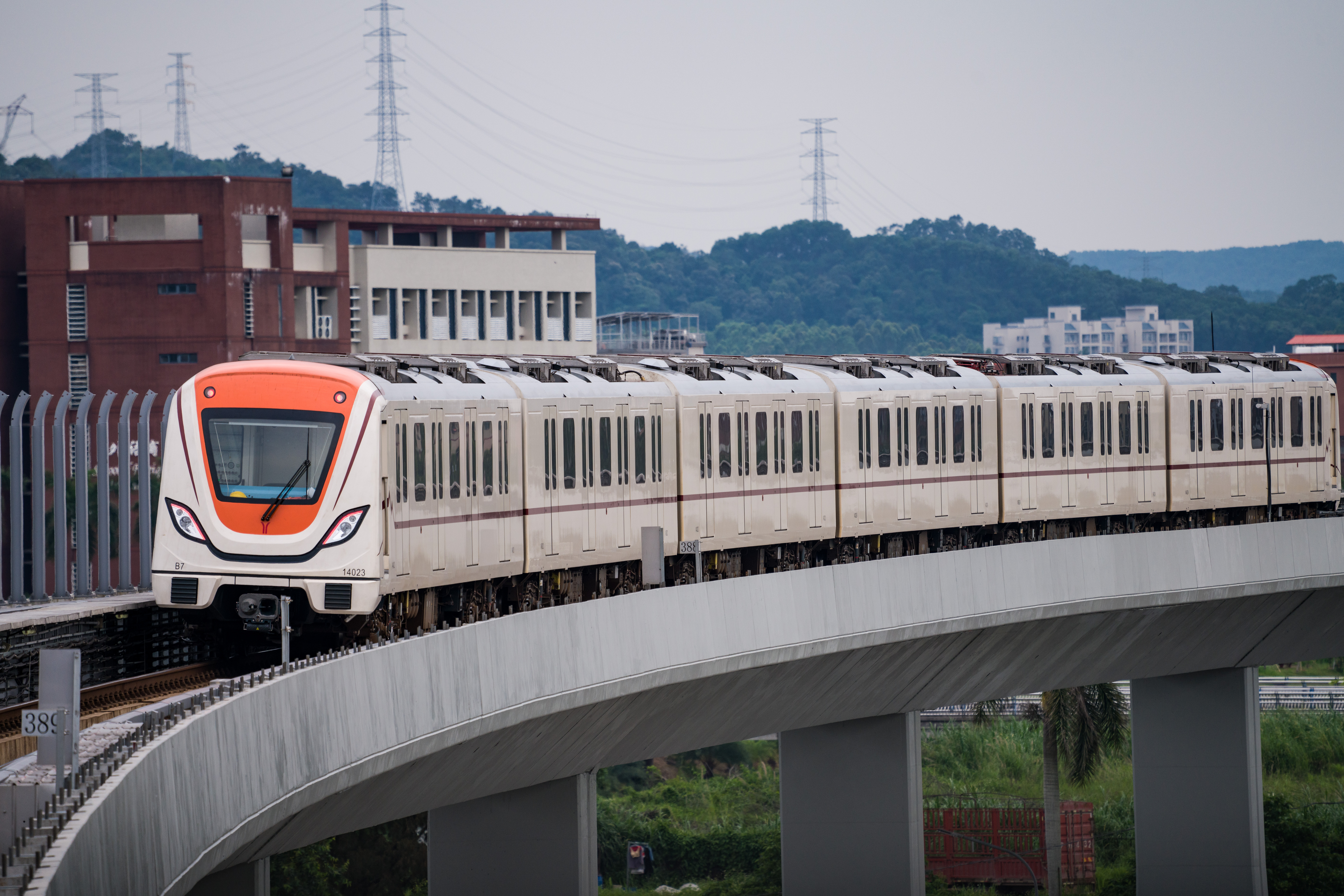
- Line 14 train near Mali

Overview
- Other name(s): M14 / M14b (plan name); Conghua line (Chinese: 从化线)
- Status: In Operation
- Owner: City of Guangzhou
- Locale: Baiyun, Huangpu and Conghua districts Guangzhou, Guangdong
- Termini: Mainline: Lejia Road—Dongfeng; Branch line: Xinhe—Zhenlong
- Stations: 29

Service
- Type: Rapid transit
- System: Guangzhou Metro
- Services: 3
- Operator: Guangzhou Metro Corporation
- Daily ridership: 251,200 (2025 daily average)

History
- Opened: 28 December 2017; 8 years ago

Technical
- Line length: 84.19 km (52.31 mi)
- Character: Underground and elevated
- Track gauge: 1,435 mm (4 ft 8 1/2 in)
- Electrification: Third rail, 1,500 V DC (Overhead lines with same voltage installed in depot)
- Operating speed: 120 km/h (75 mph)

Line 14
- Simplified Chinese: 广州地铁14号线
- Traditional Chinese: 廣州地鐵14號線
Transcriptions
Standard Mandarin
- Hanyu Pinyin: Guǎngzhōu Dìtiě Shísìhàoxiàn
Yue: Cantonese
- Jyutping: gwong^{2}zau^{1}dei^{6}tit^{3}sap^{6}sei^{3}hou^{6}sin^{3}

Line 14 of the Guangzhou Metro is a rapid transit line serving the city of Guangzhou. Like Line 21, Line 14 is a rapid suburban metro line envisioned to promote development in Guangzhou's northeast regions. Unlike other Guangzhou Metro lines, Line 14 contains passing loops at some stations to allow for express service between the city center and the outlying district of Conghua. Trains on Line 14 reach a maximum service speed of 120 km/h (75 mph), allowing for passengers to travel from outer Guangzhou to the city center in one hour. Line 14 actually consists of two independent services - a mainline which opened on 28 December 2018, connecting Lejia Road in Baiyun to Dongfeng in Conghua and a shuttle branch referred to as the Knowledge City Line, which runs from Xinhe in Baiyun to Zhenlong in Huangpu. Passengers can use a cross-platform interchange to transfer between the Line 14 mainline and the Knowledge City Line at Xinhe station. An extension south to Guangzhou railway station is currently under construction, with long-term plans to separate the Knowledge City branch into its own line as Line 27.

With a length of 84.19 km (52.31 mi), Line 14 is the longest line in Guangzhou Metro.

== History ==
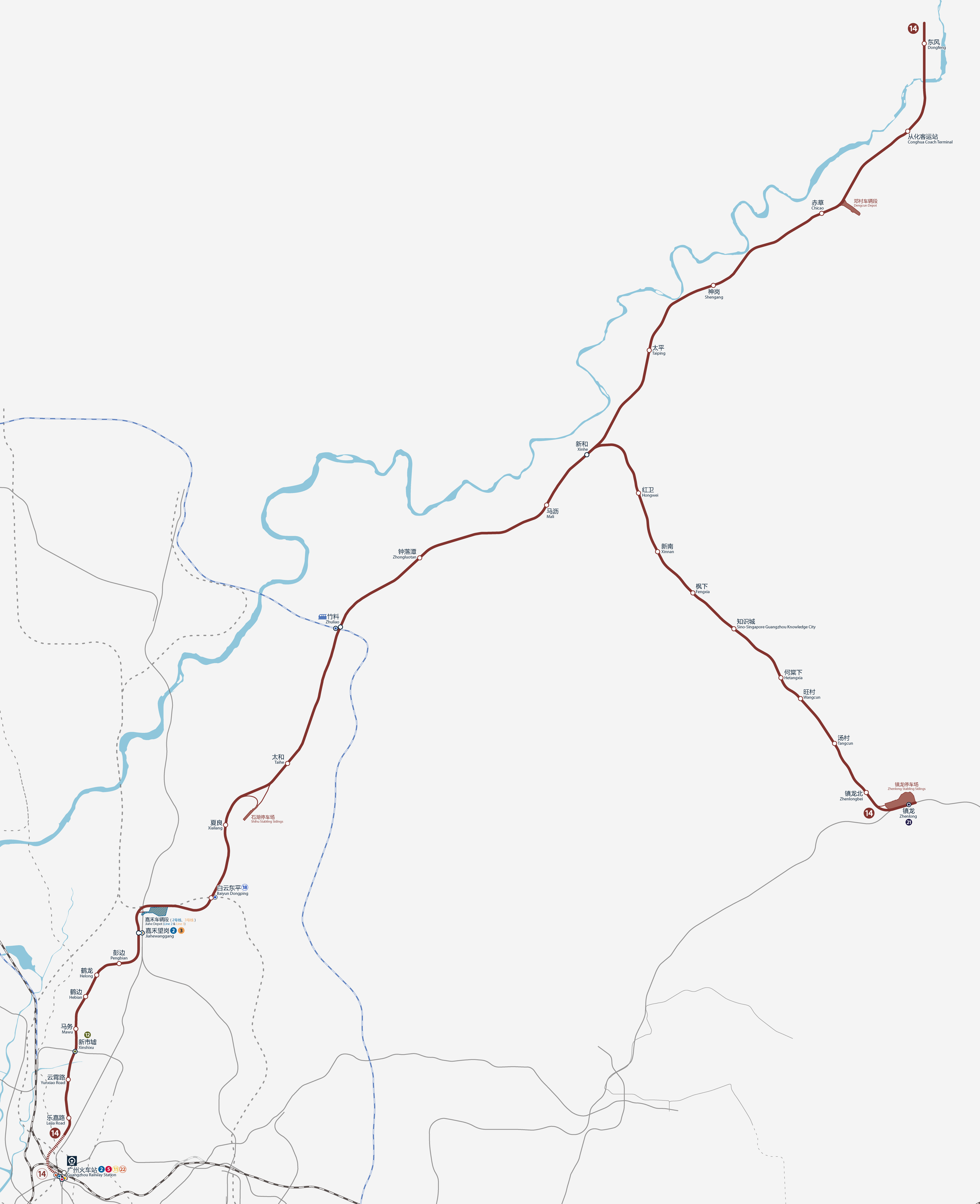
Line 14 drawn to scale.

=== Planning ===
The rough route now served by Line 14 was first proposed in the 1987 "Cross Line Network" plan as part of the then-proposed Line 2. Portions of the route were designated for subway lines in both the 1997 and 2003 plans as well. The current version of Line 14 was first proposed in the 2008 long term plan, following the Guangcong route of the old Line 9 and the airport route of the old Line 2. After Taihe, it continued southward, passing through Jiahe and Xinshi, ultimately terminating at Guangzhou Railway Station. The line was split in two phases for construction with Jiahewanggang as the dividing point, both of which were submitted for approval and built separately.

In 2010, in order to implement Guangzhou City's "Northern Excellence" development strategy and support the regional development of Conghua and Knowledge City, the "Guangzhou Rail Transit Construction Plan for 2011-2015 and the 2020 Planning Plan Announcement" proposed the construction of the first phase of Line 14 and branch lines. At that time, the Knowledge City branch line ran from Xinhe Station to Knowledge City South Station with three stations along the way, which was later extended to Zhenlong to facilitate a connection to Line 21. On August 13, 2012, the second environmental assessment of Line 14 Phase I was released with the main line serving 13 stations, including 6 underground stations and 7 elevated stations. Initially, the main line and branch lines of the first phase of Line 14 were planned to start construction in 2011 and be opened to traffic in 2015, however initial construction was delayed. According to the approval document from the National Development and Reform Commission, the main line was planned to start construction between 2013 and 2017, while the construction of the Knowledge City line would be dependent on the degree of surrounding development.

=== Construction ===
On August 13, 2012, the Ministry of Environmental Protection published the second environmental impact report. In April 2013, Taihe Station was changed from elevated to underground, and the parking lot originally located near Dongping Station was changed to be connected to Taihe Station. In March 2014, the first phase of Line 14 and the Knowledge City branch line were approved by the Guangdong Provincial Development and Reform Commission to start construction. Tunnel boring began in March 2015. In May 2017, the main structure of Zhenlong Station was finished, marking the completion of structural construction of all stations on the Knowledge City branch line. On May 28, tunnel boring from Xinnan Station to Fengxia Station was finished, marking the completion of the entire tunnel of the Knowledge City branch line. On August 22, all tracks of the Knowledge City Line were successfully completed. On November 2, the main structure of Jiekou (now Dongfeng Station), the largest station in the first phase of Line 14, was completed. On January 30, 2018, the main structure of Zhongluotan Station was finished, marking the completion of the main structure project of all stations in the first phase of the main line. On May 8, tunnel boring from Jiekou Station (now Dongfeng Station) to Jiangpu Station (now Conghua Passenger Terminal) was completed.

Line 14 was constructed alongside major works on Xinguangcong Road. Original plans had the construction of the metro occurring after completion of roadway reconstruction, however delays in starting the roadway project led to Line 14 being constructed first. Xinguangcong Road was fully open to traffic in June 2021, four years after completion of Line 14.

=== Chronology ===
Segment	Commencement	Length	Station(s)	Name
Xinhe — Zhenlong	28 December 2017	21.01 km (13.06 mi)	10	Knowledge City line
Jiahewanggang — Dongfeng	28 December 2018	54.38 km (33.79 mi)	12	Phase 1
Lejia Road — Jiahewanggang	29 September 2025	8.8 km (5.47 mi)	7	Phase 2
Guangzhou Railway Station — Lejia Road	To be determined	3.0 km (1.86 mi)	1	Phase 2

The first stage of Line 14 to begin service was the section between Xinhe and Zhenlong, now known as the Knowledge City Line (Chinese: 知识城线). It opened on December 28, 2017 as a standalone line separate from the rest of the system. The current mainline section between Jiahewanggang and Dongfeng opened a year later on December 28, 2018. Phase 2 opened between Jiahewanggang and Lejia Road on 29 September 2025.

=== Phase 2 Southern Extension ===
The second phase of Line 14 extends the mainline south to Guangzhou Railway Station from Jiahewanggang. The extension is about 11.74 km (7.29 mi) long, and is entirely underground with 8 new stations. It will have shorter station spacing than the rest of the mainline in order to better serve denser areas closer to the city center, with an average station spacing of 1.46 km (0.91 mi). The electrical substation at Baiyun Culture Square was expanded to meet the necessary power requirements.

This section received project approval by the National Development and Reform Commission in late March 2017, with the work feasibility report approved in early January 2018. A groundbreaking ceremony occurred on 19 November 2018, with official construction beginning shortly later. On June 30, 2019, the first tunnel boring machine departed south from the Jiahewanggang Station construction site.

Due to renovation requirements of the national rail station at Guangzhou railway station, construction for this station was postponed, therefore the section between Jiahewanggang and Lejia Road opened first on 29 September 2025.

== Future Expansion ==
=== Knowledge City Line ===
Current long-term plans have the Knowledge City Line splitting off from Line 14 to be its own standalone route, Line 27. These plans include a southeastern extension from Zhenlong down past Xinsha on Line 13 and crossing the Dongjiang river into Dongguan.

== Service Patterns ==
Line 14 currently hosts 3 separate service patterns:

- Lejia Road — Dongfeng Local: Mainline local services, stop at every stations on mainline
- Lejia Road — Dongfeng Express: Mainline limited express services, stop all stations between Lejia Road and Baiyun Dongping, then Zhuliao, Xinhe, Conghua Coach Terminal, Dongfeng
- Xinhe — Zhenlong: Knowledge City branch line service operating independently from mainline services

== Stations ==
- L - local services
- R - rapid express services
- BL - branch line local services

Section	L	R	B L	Station №	Station name		Connections	Future Connections	Distance km		Location
Section	L	R	B L	Station №	English	Chinese	Connections	Future Connections	Distance km		Location
Phase 2				1401	Guangzhou Railway Station (Note: To cooperate with the planned renovation of the respective national railway station, the Line 14 station at Guangzhou Railway Station will not be built until a later date.)	广州火车站	2 216; 5 506 GZQ	11 1114; 22			Yuexiu
Phase 2	●	●		1402	Lejia Road	乐嘉路					Baiyun
Phase 2	●	●		1403	Yunxiao Road	云霄路					Baiyun
Phase 2	●	●		1404	Xinshixu	新市墟	12 1207				Baiyun
Phase 2	●	●		1405	Mawu	马务					Baiyun
Phase 2	●	●		1406	Hebian	鹤边					Baiyun
Phase 2	●	●		1407	Helong	鹤龙					Baiyun
Phase 2	●	●		1408	Pengbian	彭边					Baiyun
Phase 1	●	●		1409	Jiahewanggang	嘉禾望岗	2 224 3 325		0.00	0.00	Baiyun
Phase 1	●	●		1410	Baiyun Dongping	白云东平		18	4.31	4.31	Baiyun
Phase 1	●	｜		1411	Xialiang	夏良			3.16	7.47	Baiyun
Phase 1	●	｜		1412	Taihe	太和			3.50	10.97	Baiyun
Phase 1	●	●		1413	Zhuliao	竹料	ZUA ER SS		6.18	17.15	Baiyun
Phase 1	●	｜		1414	Zhongluotan	钟落潭			4.70	21.85	Baiyun
Phase 1	●	｜		1415	Mali	马沥			6.11	27.96	Baiyun
Phase 1	●	●	●	1416	Xinhe	新和	14 (Knowledge City Branch)		2.02	29.98	Baiyun
Phase 1	●	｜	｜	1417	Taiping	太平			5.16	35.14	Conghua
Phase 1	●	｜	｜	1418	Shengang	神岗			3.90	39.04	Conghua
Phase 1	●	｜	｜	1419	Chicao	赤草			5.46	44.50	Conghua
Phase 1	●	●	｜	1420	Conghua Coach Terminal	从化客运站			5.03	49.53	Conghua
Phase 1	●	●	｜	1421	Dongfeng	东风			4.58	54.38	Conghua
Knowledge; City Branch			●	1422	Hongwei	红卫			3.66	58.04	Huangpu
Knowledge; City Branch			●	1423	Xinnan	新南	JFA SS		2.58	60.62	Huangpu
Knowledge; City Branch			●	1424	Fengxia	枫下			2.12	62.74	Huangpu
Knowledge; City Branch			●	1425	Sino-Singapore Guangzhou Knowledge City	知识城			2.41	65.15	Huangpu
Knowledge; City Branch			●	1426	Hetangxia	何棠下			2.74	67.89	Huangpu
Knowledge; City Branch			●	1427	Wangcun	旺村			1.19	69.08	Huangpu
Knowledge; City Branch			●	1428	Tangcun	汤村			2.24	71.32	Huangpu
Knowledge; City Branch			●	1429	Zhenlongbei	镇龙北			2.25	73.57	Huangpu
Knowledge; City Branch			●	1430	Zhenlong	镇龙	21 2114 ZEA SS		1.82	75.39	Huangpu
