= Dongfeng station (Guangzhou Metro) =

Metro station in Guangzhou, China

Dongfeng 东风
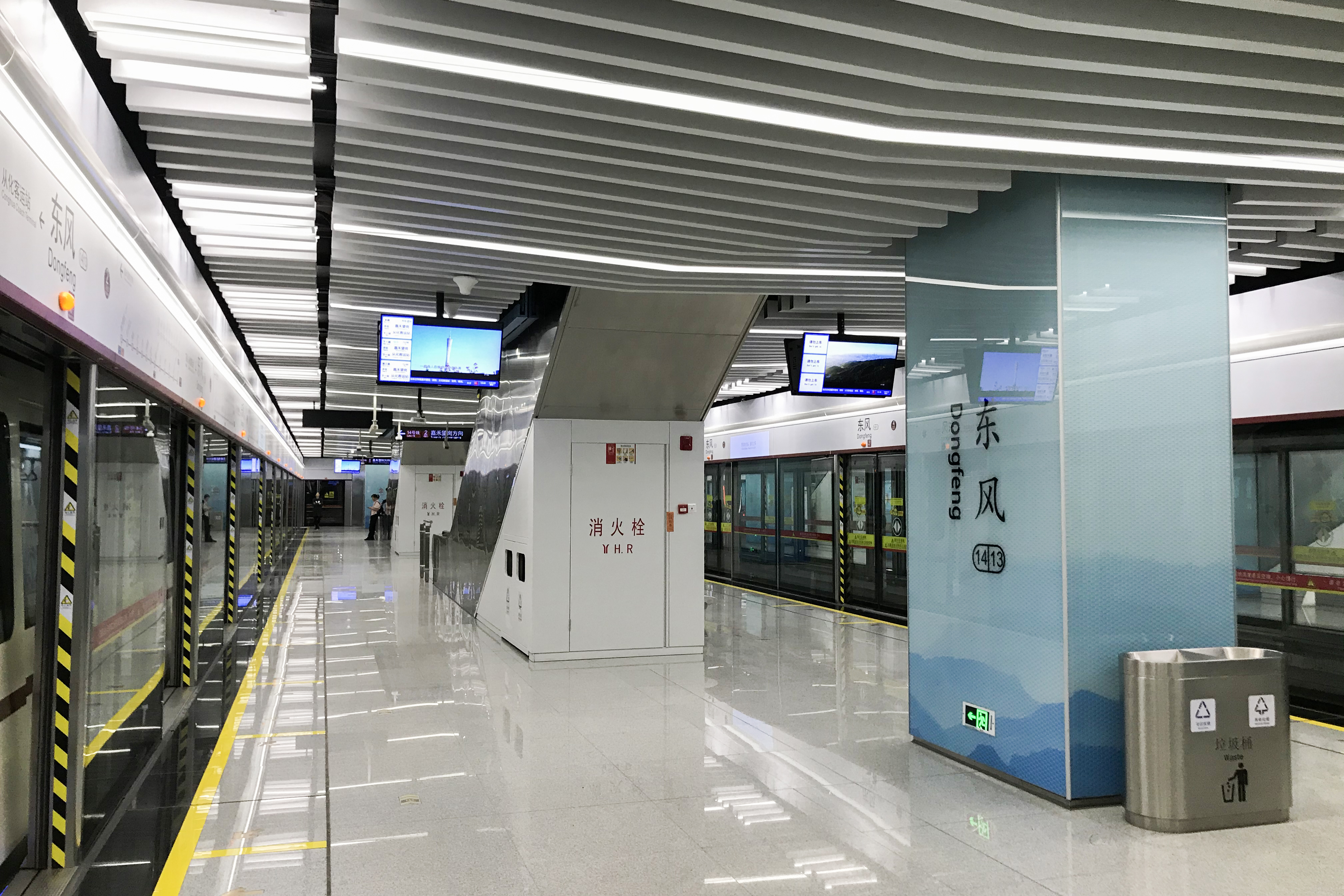
- Platform 2 (originating platform)

Chinese name
- Simplified Chinese: 东风站
- Traditional Chinese: 東風站
Transcriptions
Standard Mandarin
- Hanyu Pinyin: Dōngfēng Zhàn
Yue: Cantonese
- Jyutping: dung^{1}fung^{1} zaam^{6}

General information
- Location: Conghua Avenue (从化大道); Conghua District, Guangzhou, Guangdong; China
- Coordinates: 23°34′10″N 113°35′45″E
- Operated by: Guangzhou Metro Co. Ltd.
- Line: Line 14
- Platforms: 4 (2 island platforms)
- Tracks: 3

Construction
- Structure type: Underground
- Accessible: Yes

Other information
- Station code: 1421

History
- Opened: 28 December 2018; 7 years ago

Services
Preceding station	Guangzhou Metro	Following station
Conghua Coach Terminal towards Lejia Road	Line 14	Terminus
Location

Dongfeng station (simplified Chinese: 东风站; traditional Chinese: 東風站) is a station of Line 14 of the Guangzhou Metro. It is also the northern terminus of the mainline of Line 14, and the northernmost station of the Guangzhou Metro system. It started operations on 28 December 2018.

It is the only station on Line 14 to have a theme.

The station has 2 underground island platforms with 3 tracks. Trains usually stop at the outer 2 platforms. Platform 1 is a termination platform, whilst platform 2 is for trains heading to Lejia Road. Platforms 3 and 4 serve the middle track.

== Station layout ==
B1; Concourse	Lobby	Customer Service, Vending machines, ATMs, Exits
B2; Platforms	Platform 2	14 towards Lejia Road (Conghua Coach Terminal)
B2; Platforms	Island platform, doors will open on the left
B2; Platforms	Platform 4 ↑ Platform 3 ↓	14 reserved platform
B2; Platforms	Island platform, doors will open on the left
B2; Platforms	Platform 1	14 termination platform

== History ==
During construction, this station was referred to as Jiekou.

== Exits ==
There are 3 exits, lettered B, C and D. Exit D is accessible. All exits are located on Conghua Avenue.

== Gallery ==
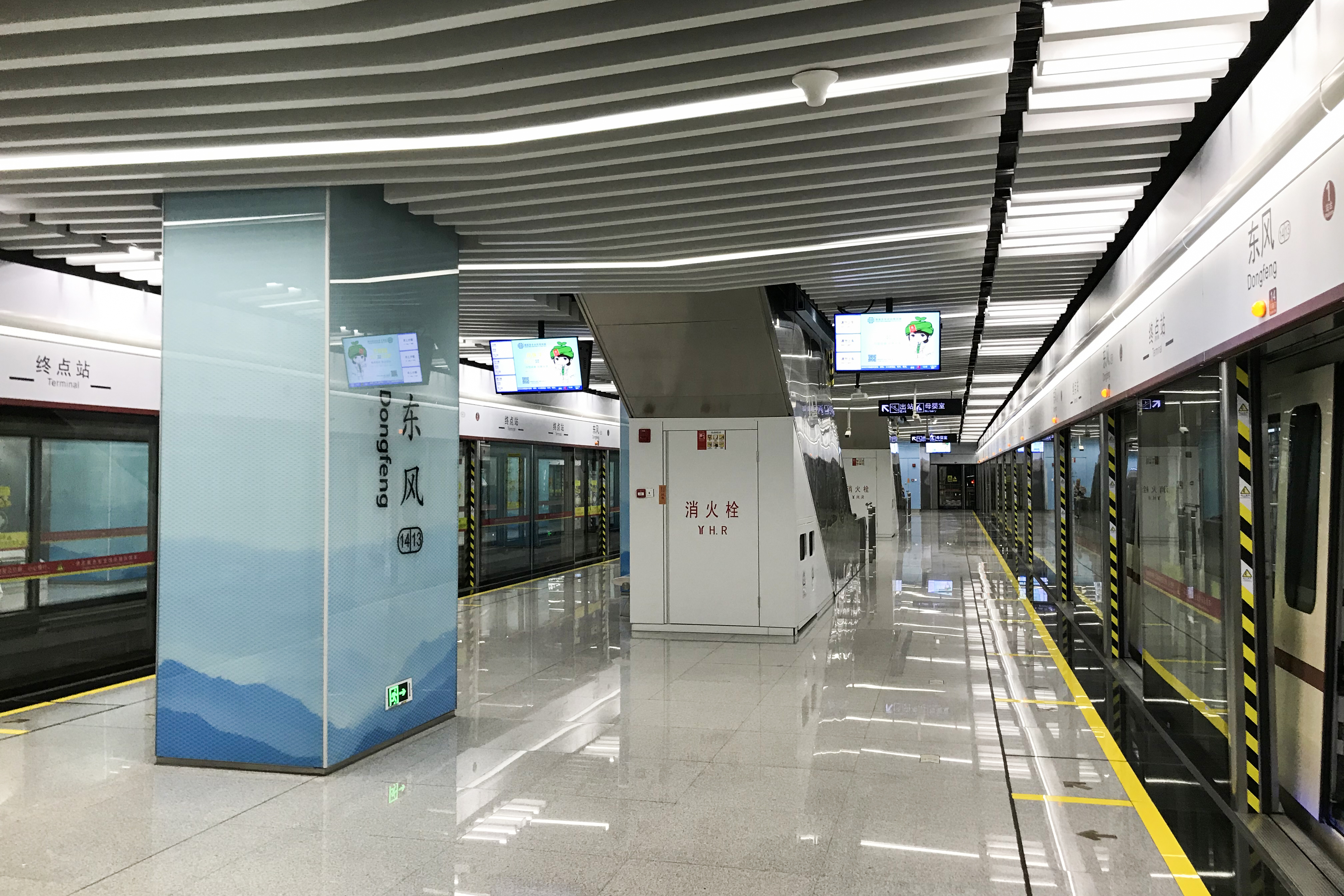
Platform 1

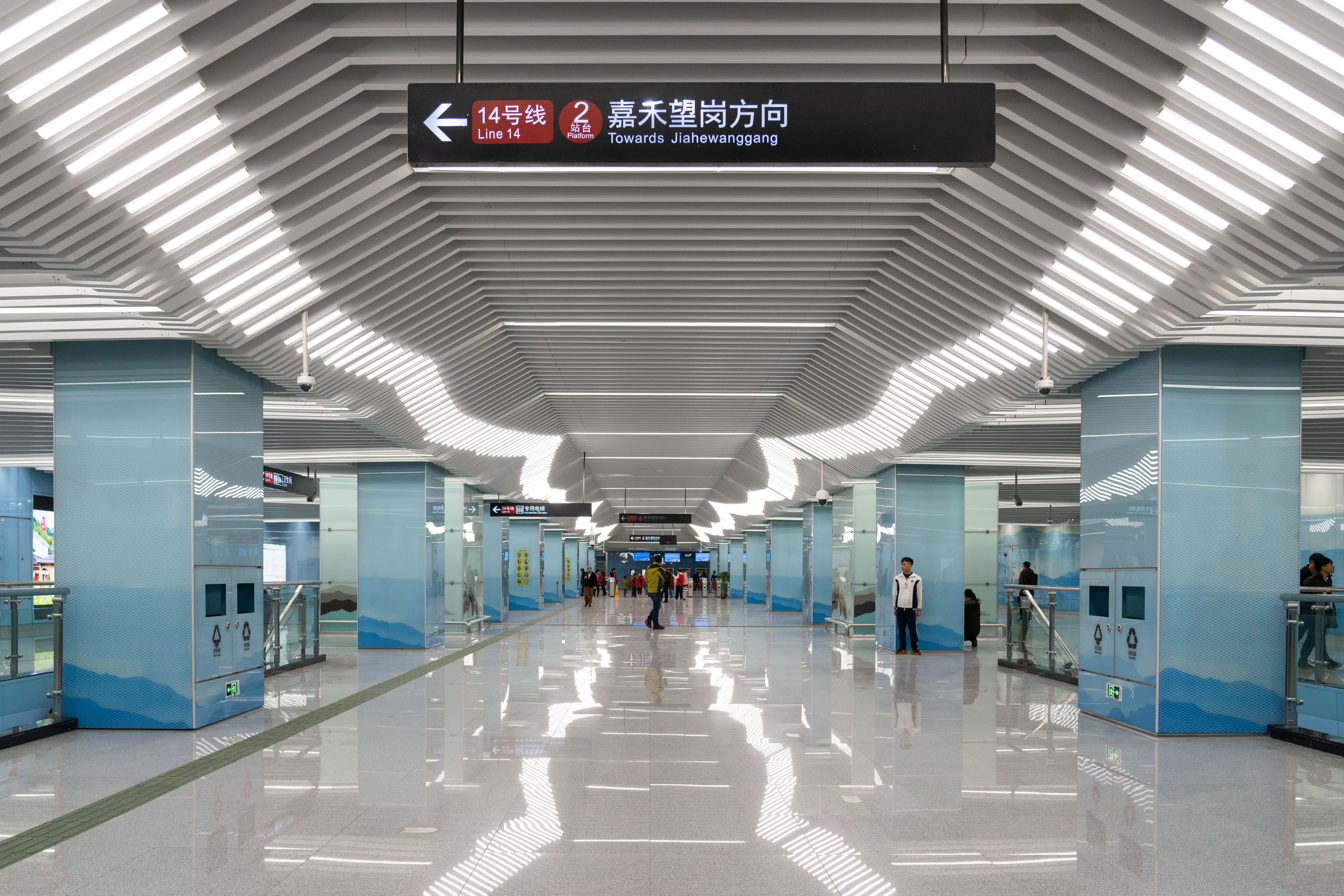
Concourse
