= Lejia Road station =

Guangzhou Metro Line 14 station

Lejia Road 乐嘉路
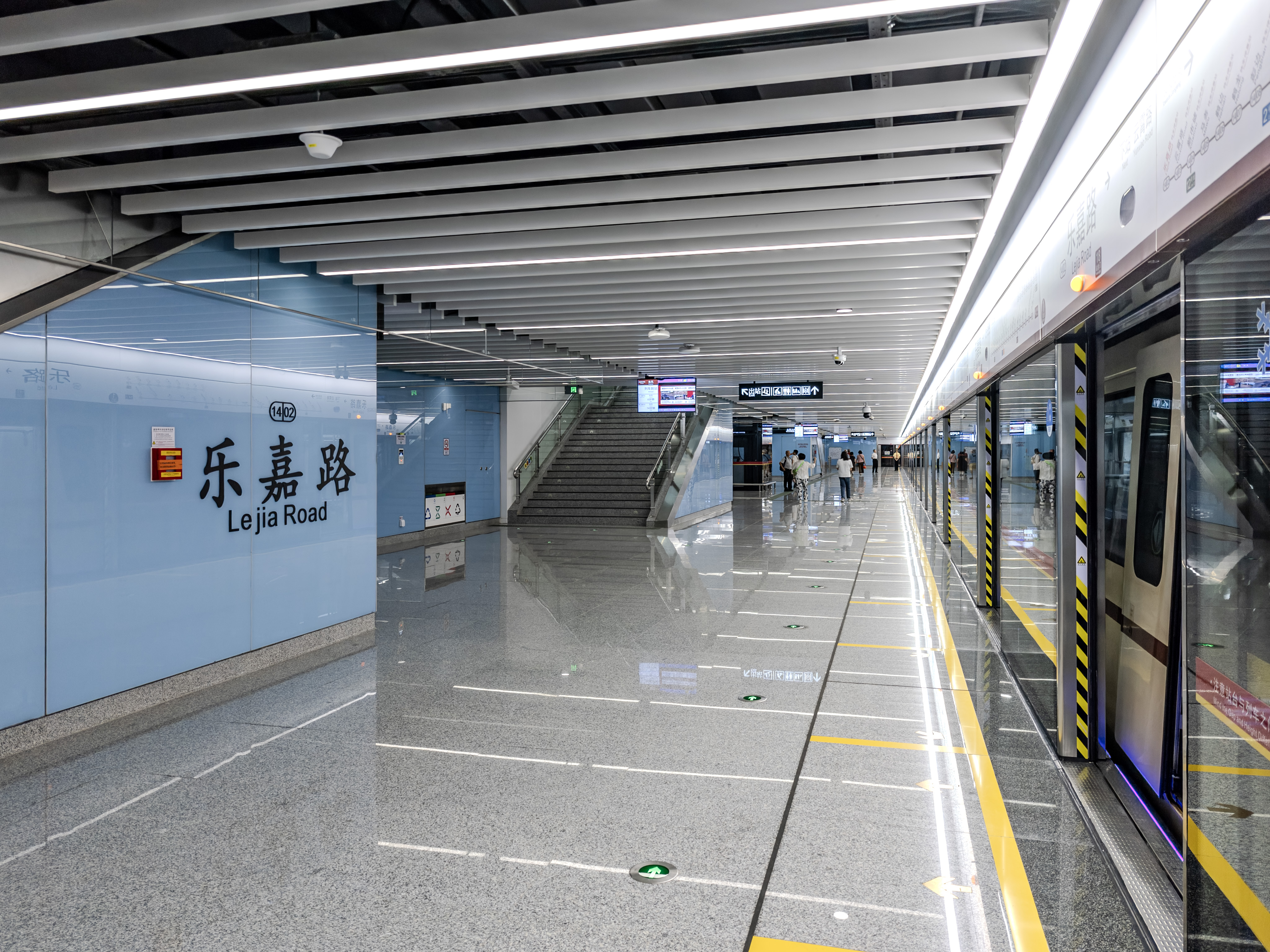
- Platform 1

Chinese name
- Simplified Chinese: 乐嘉路站
- Traditional Chinese: 樂嘉路站
Transcriptions
Standard Mandarin
- Hanyu Pinyin: Lèjiā Lù Zhàn
Yue: Cantonese
- Yale Romanization: Lohkgā Lǒu Jaahm
- Jyutping: lok6 gaa1 lou6 zaam6

General information
- Location: North of intersection between Airport Road (机场路) and Yuncheng West Road (云城西路); Sanyuanli Subdistrict, Baiyun District, Guangzhou, Guangdong; China
- Coordinates: 23°10′24.67″N 113°15′19.80″E
- Operator: Guangzhou Metro Co. Ltd.
- Line: Line 14
- Platforms: 2 (2 side platforms)
- Tracks: 2

Construction
- Structure type: Underground
- Accessible: Yes

Other information
- Station code: 1402

History
- Opened: 29 September 2025 (10 months ago)

Services
| Preceding station | Guangzhou Metro | Following station |
|---|---|---|
| Terminus | Line 14 | Yunxiao Road towards Dongfeng |
Future services
| Guangzhou Railway Station Terminus | Line 14 | Yunxiao Road towards Dongfeng |
Location

Lejia Road station (simplified Chinese: 乐嘉路站; traditional Chinese: 樂嘉路站; pinyin: Lèjiā Lù Zhàn; Cantonese Yale: Lohkgā Lǒu Jaahm) is a station on Line 14 of the Guangzhou Metro. It is located north of the junction between Airport Road and Yuncheng West Road in the Sanyuanli Subdistrict of Baiyun District in Guangzhou. It opened on 29 September 2025 and is the current southern terminus of the Line 14 mainline.

== Station Layout ==
=== Station Floorings ===
The station has three underground floors. It is 246.7 metres (809 ft) long, 31.5 metres (103 ft) wide, and about 22.8 metres (75 ft) deep. The ground level serves as the station's entrances and exits and is surrounded by Airport Road, Airport Expressway viaduct, Yuncheng West Road, Yuanjing Road, Baiyun District Government Service Center, Baiyun District Civil Aviation School Primary Campus, and adjacent buildings. The first underground floor serves as the mezzanine connecting the entrances/exits and the concourse, the second underground floor serves as the station concourse, and the third underground floor houses the platforms.

| G | Street level | Exits B, C, D |
| L1 | Mezzanine | Towards Exits B, C and Concourse; Security Facilities |
| L2; Concourse | Lobby | Ticket Machines, Customer Service, Shops, Police Station, Security Facilities |
| L3; Platforms | Reserved Side platform |
| L3; Platforms | Platform 2 | 14 reserved platform |
| L3; Platforms | Platform 1 | 14 towards Dongfeng (Yunxiao Road) |
| L3; Platforms | Side platform, doors will open on the left (Toilets, Nursery) |

=== Concourse ===
The station concourse is equipped with ticket vending machines and an intelligent customer service center.

To facilitate pedestrian access, the center of the concourse is designated as a paid area. Within this area, dedicated elevators, escalators, and stairs provide easy access to the platforms.

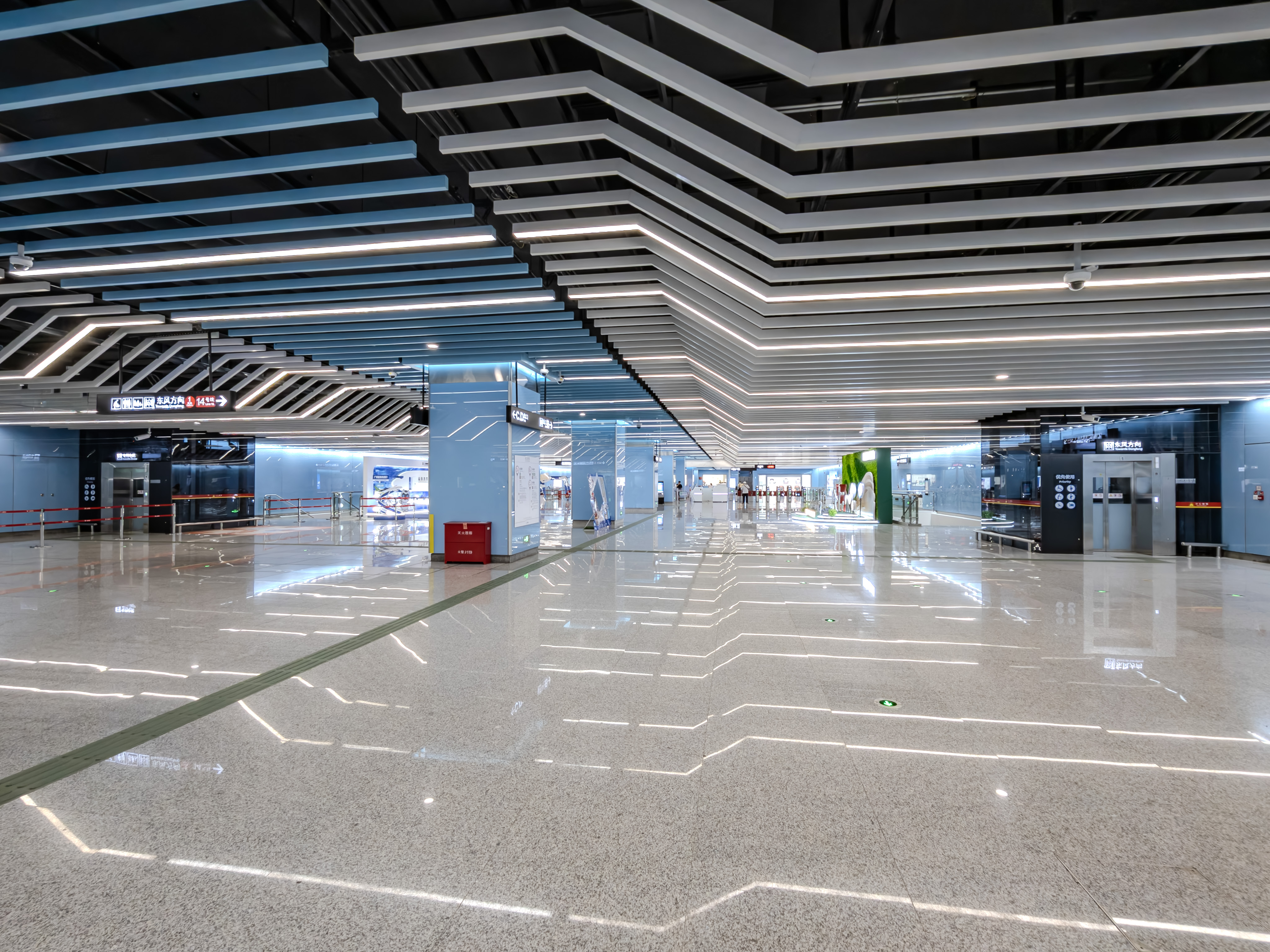
Concourse

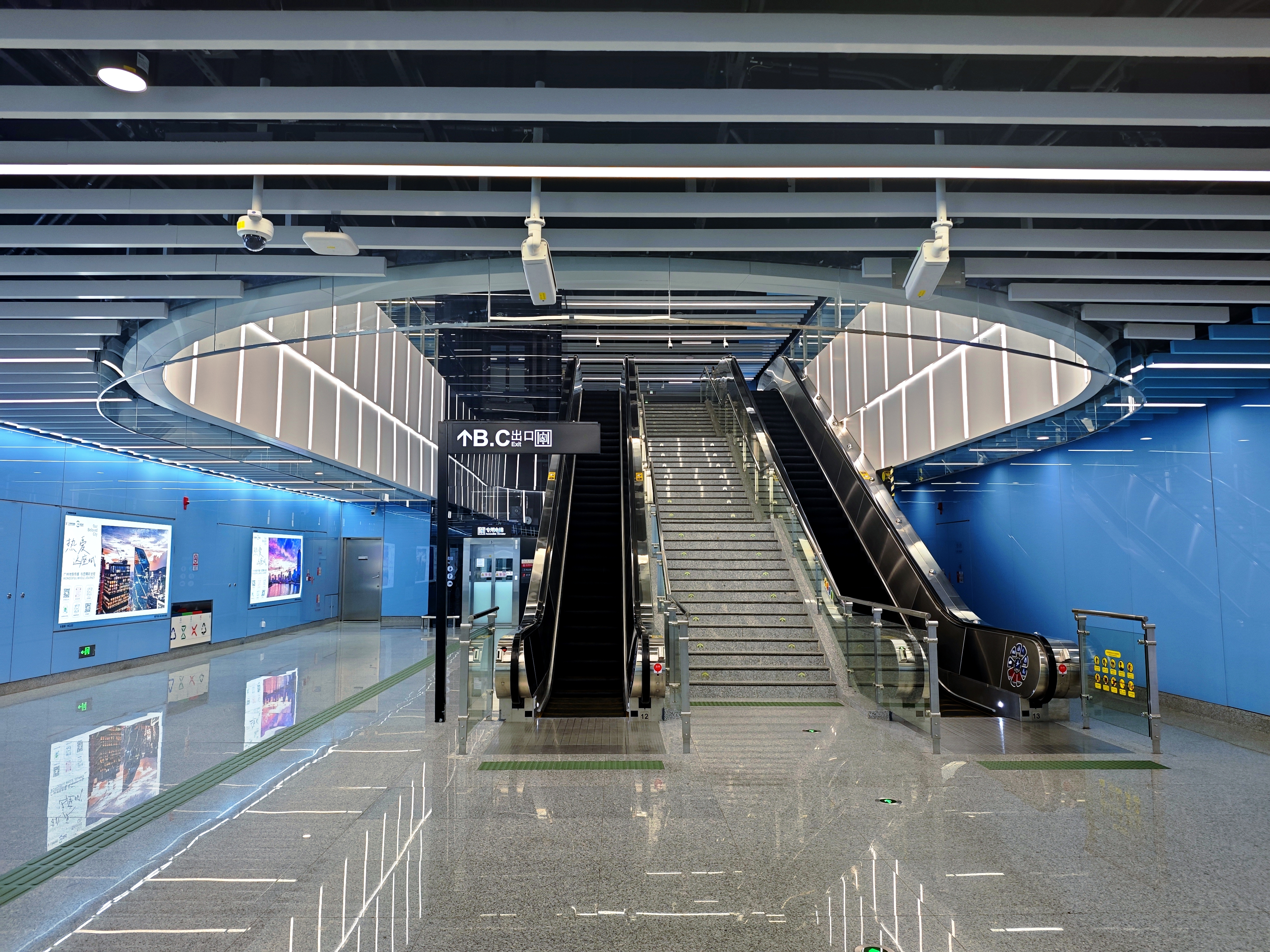
The northern atrium of the concourse

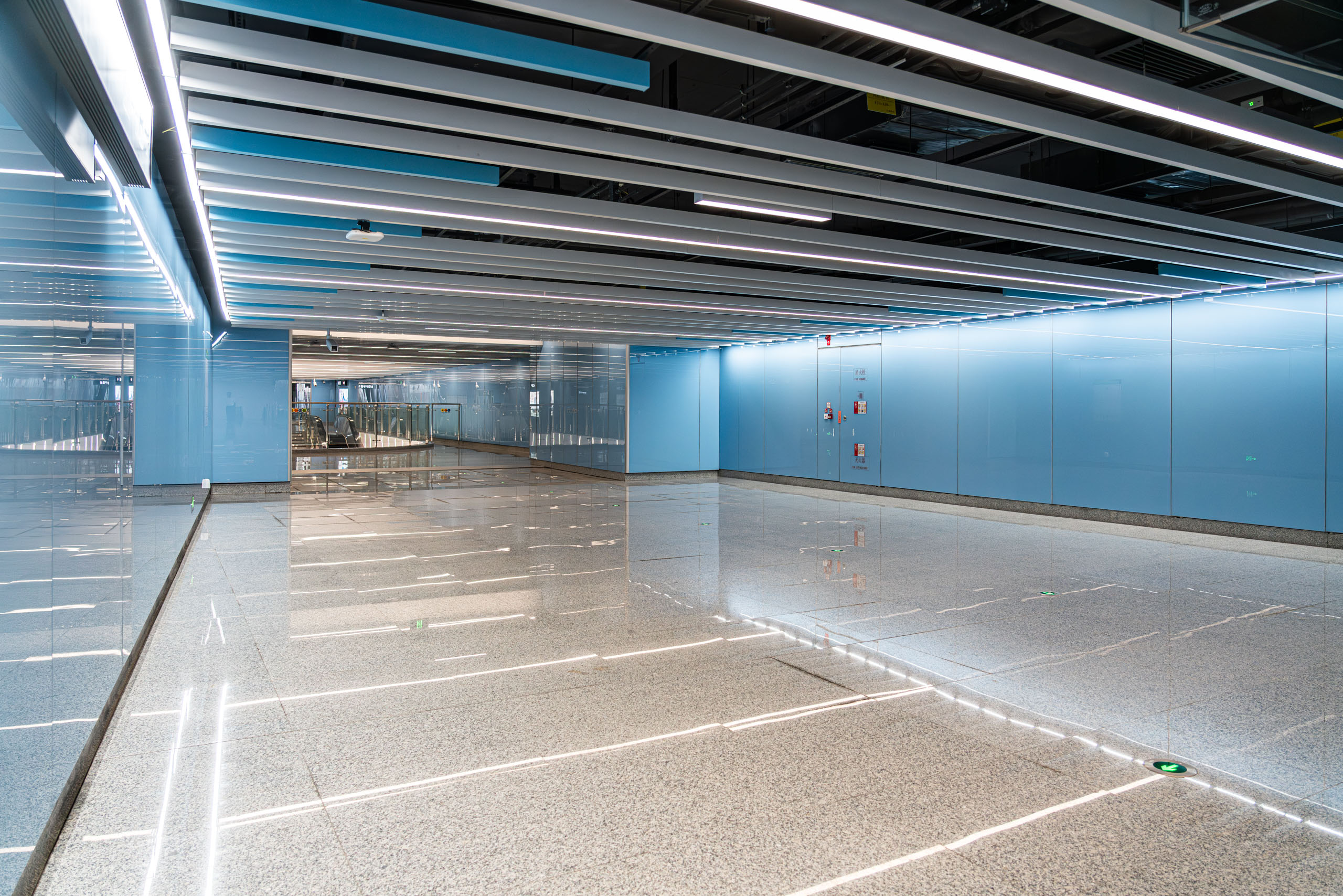
Mezzanine level

=== Platforms ===
The station has two side platforms located underground on the east side of Airport Road. Toilets and a nursing room are located at the southern end of Platform 1. Only Platform 1 is currently open to passengers.

In addition, there is a set of crossing lines at the north end of the station, and since the station is the temporary terminus of the second phase of Line 14, Line 14 will turnback before the station through this group of crossing lines. In addition, during the construction of this station, a tunnel of about 800 meters was dug to the south with track laid, and the end of the track is situated roughly near the Guangzhou Civil Aviation College. The two sections of track of the tunnel will be temporarily used as storage lines and can be used as temporary parking of faulty trains or backup trains when necessary.

=== Entrances/exits ===
The station has 3 points of entry/exit. Exit B is equipped with an elevator.

- B: Airport Road
- C: Airport Road, Yuncheng West Road, Feixiang Park station (Entrances A and C)
- D: Airport Road, Lejia Road, Yuanjing Road, Guangzhou Baiyun District Government Service Center
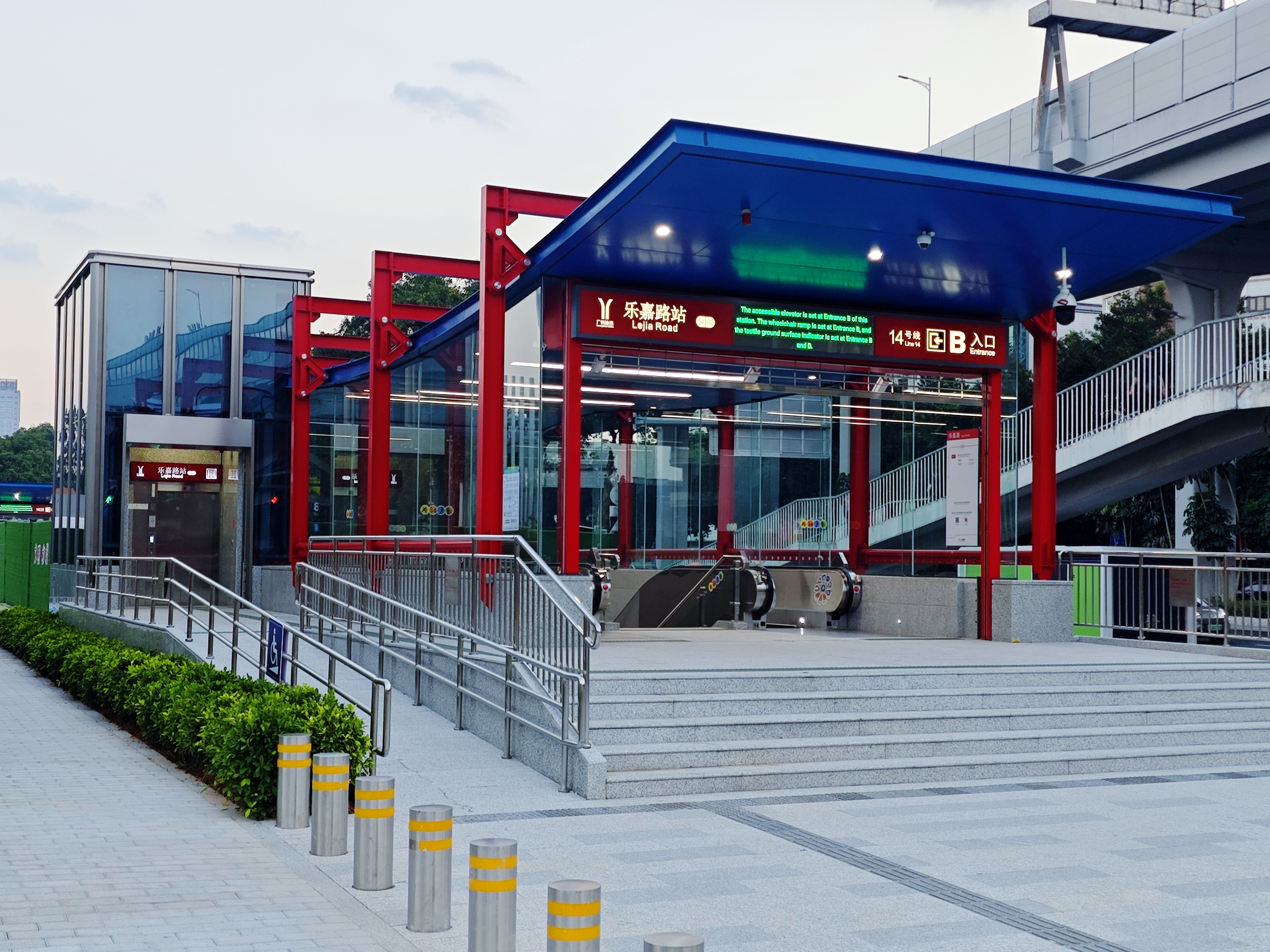
Entrance B

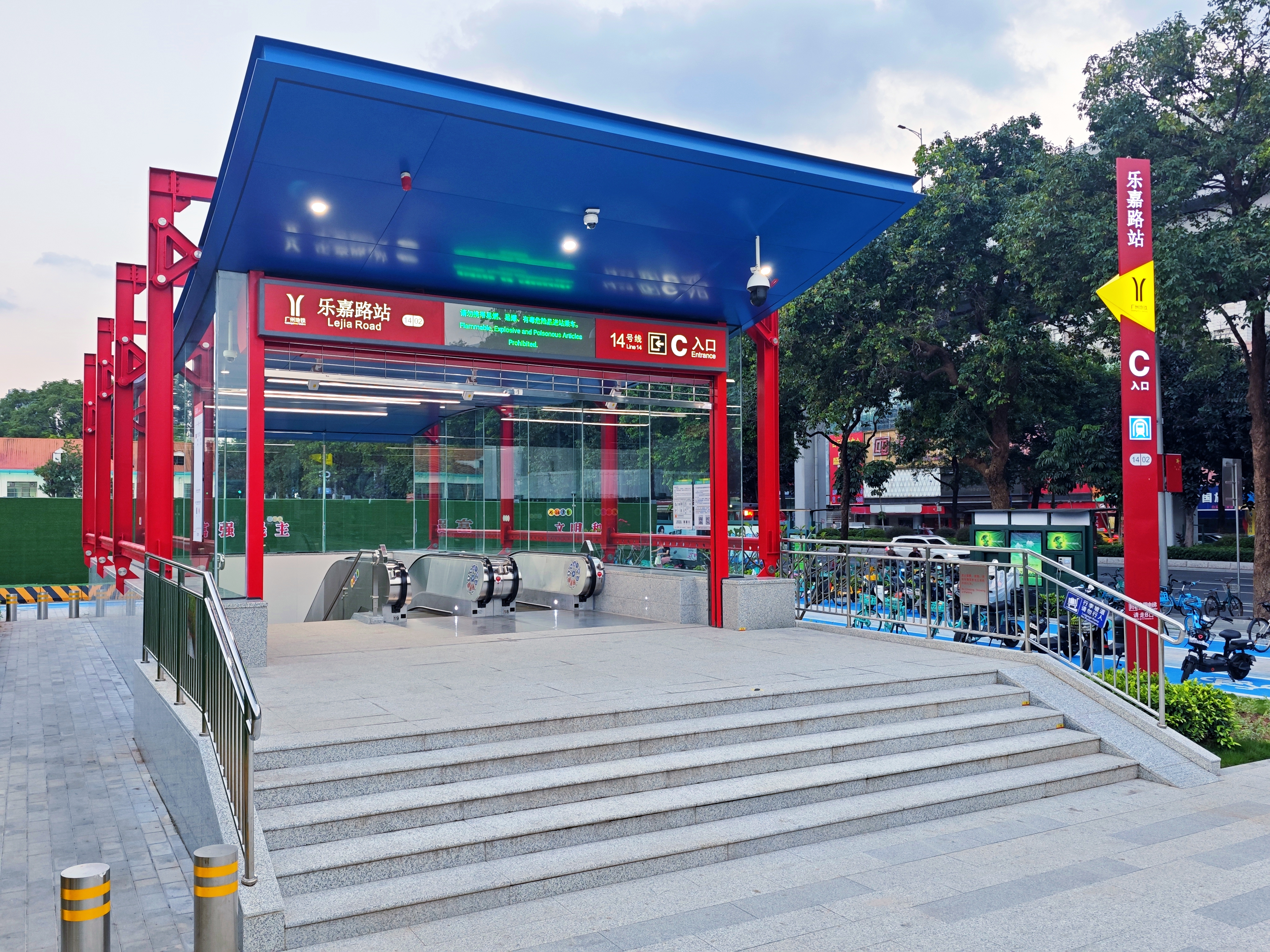
Entrance C

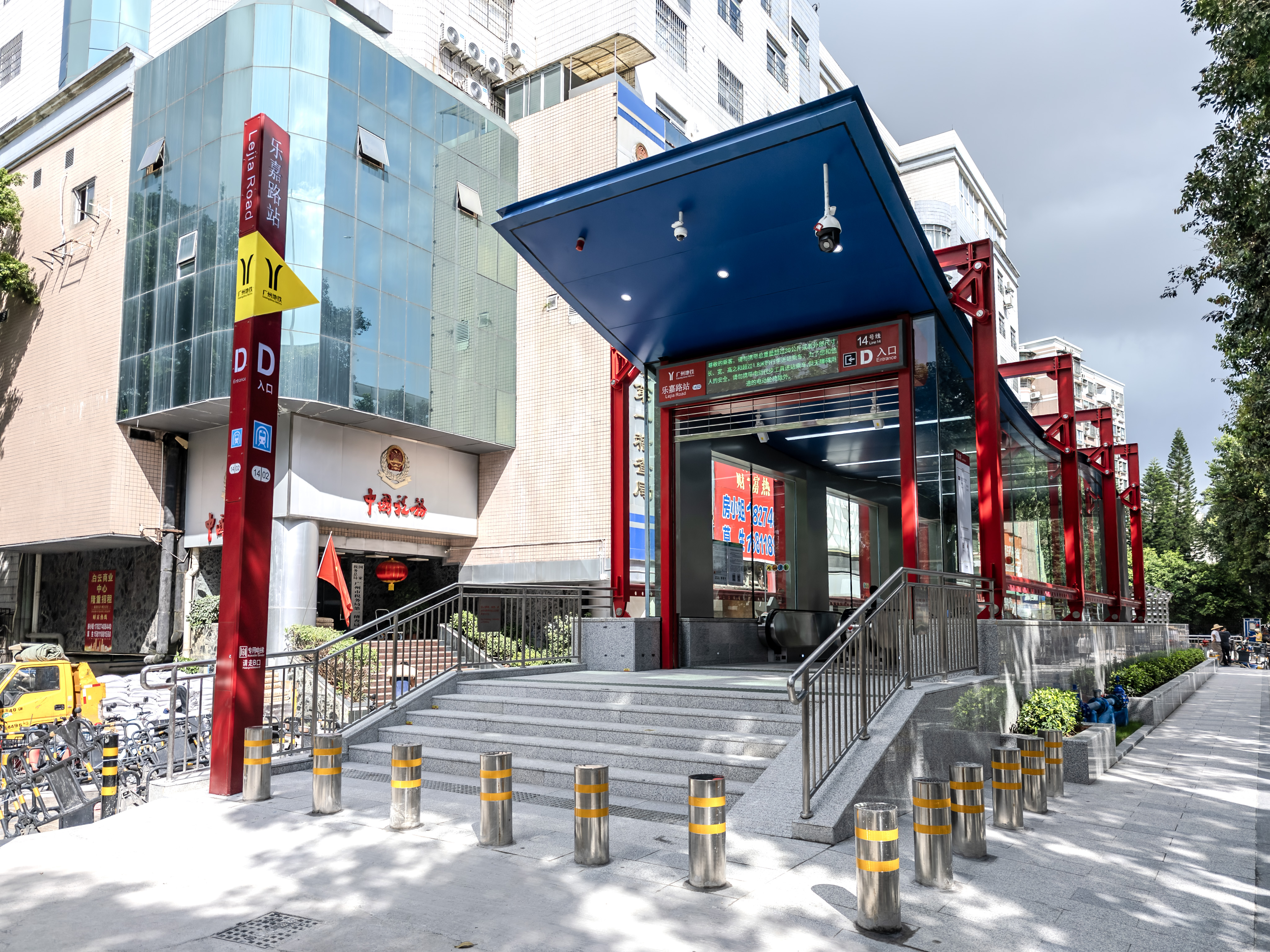
Escalator of Entrance D

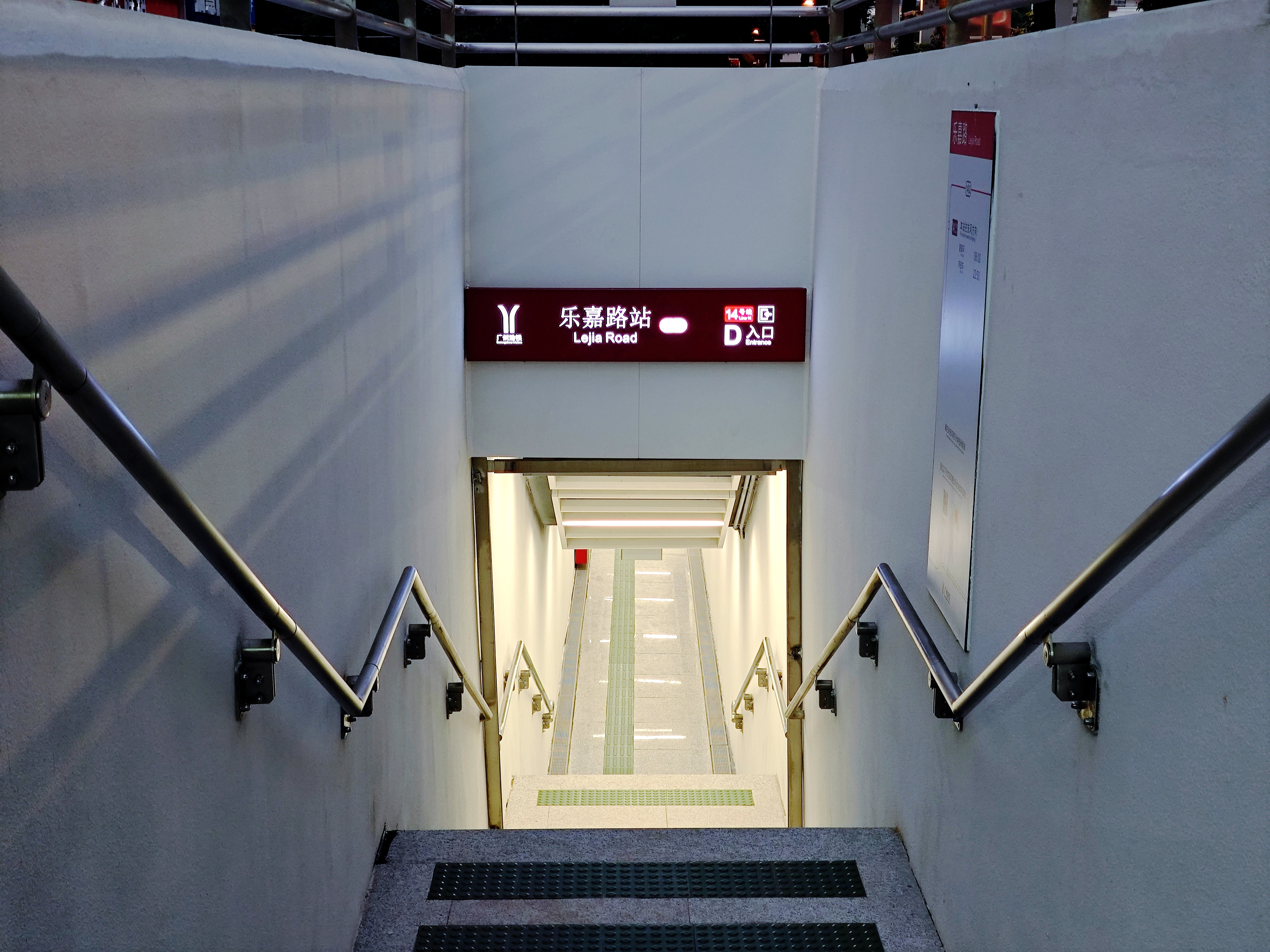
Stairs of Entrance D

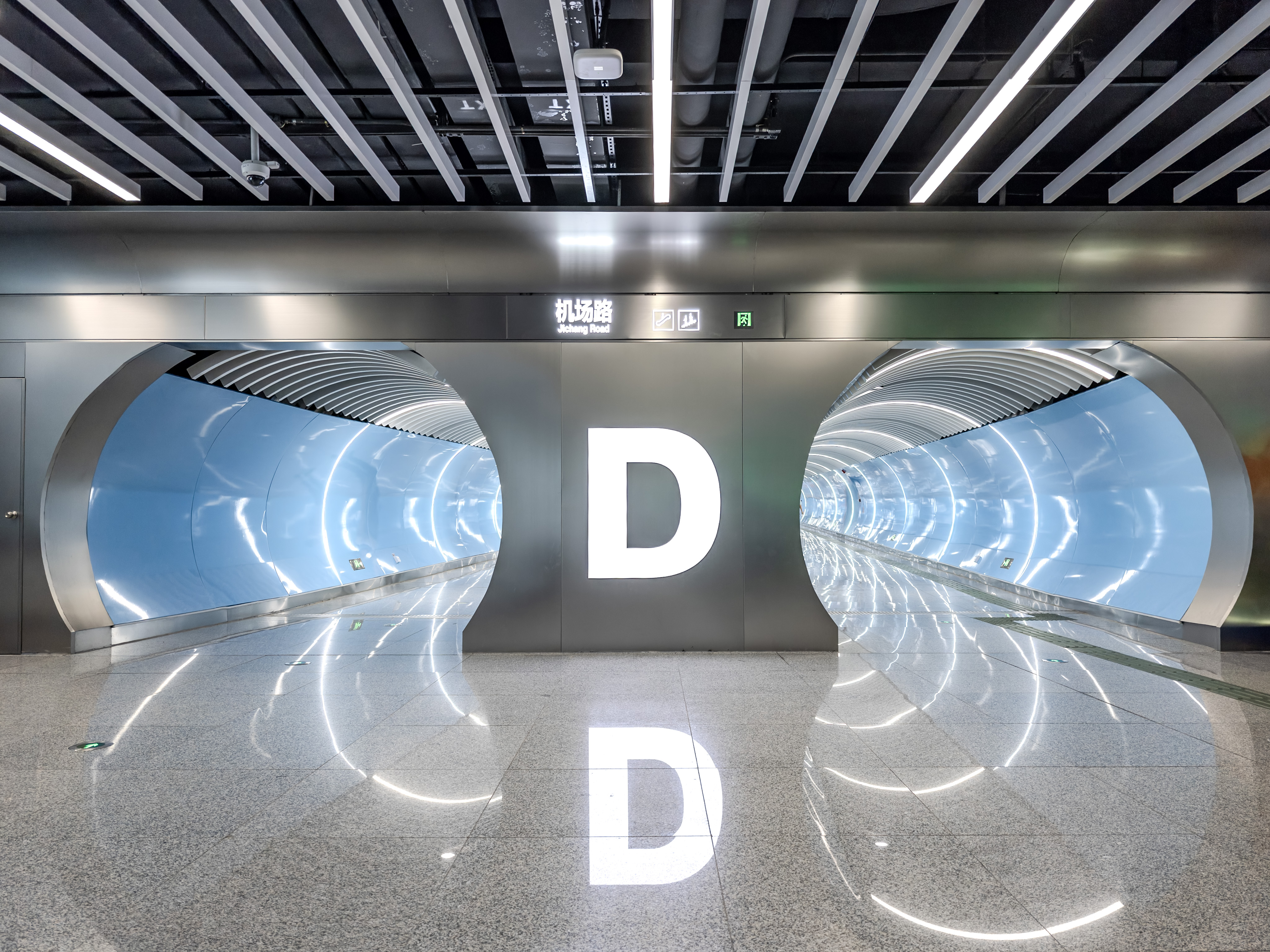
Exit D shield tunnel channel

== History ==
The original plan for the second phase of Line 14 did not include this station. Later, several stations were added to the line, with this station being one of them, before the second phase was approved and the station earmarked for construction. The station was named Lejia Road station during the construction period. In July 2025, the Guangzhou Municipal Transportation Bureau announced the preliminary station names for the second phase of Line 14, and this station retained its current name. During the consultation period some netizens suggested station names like "Yuanjing" and "Yuanjing Road". The Municipal Transportation Bureau issued a comment on the request of opinions two months later, believing that the entrance/exit of the station on the west side of Airport Road are about 180 meters away from Lejia Road on the south side and about 260 meters away from Yuanjing Road on the north side. The two entrances/exits on the east side of Airport Road need to cross Airport Road or detour south through the pedestrian bridge to get to Yuanjing Road, so it is more accurate to have the station be named "Lejia Road station". Finally, the station was officially named Lejia Road station in September 2025.

The original plan of this station is a conventional two-story underground island-style intermediate station. Due to the unstable renovation plan around Guangzhou railway station, the planned southern terminus of the second phase of Line 14, the station added a single crossover in the preliminary design stage in 2018, so that the second phase can be used as an interim terminus in the early stage of opening. After that, the design was adjusted, the island platform was changed to a side platform, and the single crossover was adjusted to a double-crossover.

Initial station construction was slow due to the involvement of multiple parties, resulting in a slow land acquisition process. In April 2021, China Southern Air Holding Company Ltd. handed over the site, and the construction unit was able to enter the site for construction. The station began construction of the base plate in August 2023, and the main structure topped out on 20 January 2024. The station completed the "three rights" transfer on 30 June 2025.

On 29 September 2025, the station opened for operation.
