= Zhuliao station =

Zhuliao station may refers to:

- Zhuliao railway station, station of Pearl River Delta intercity railway.
- Zhuliao station (Guangzhou Metro), station of Guangzhou Metro.
