= Zhuliao station (Guangzhou Metro) =

Guangzhou Metro Line 14 station

Zhuliao 竹料
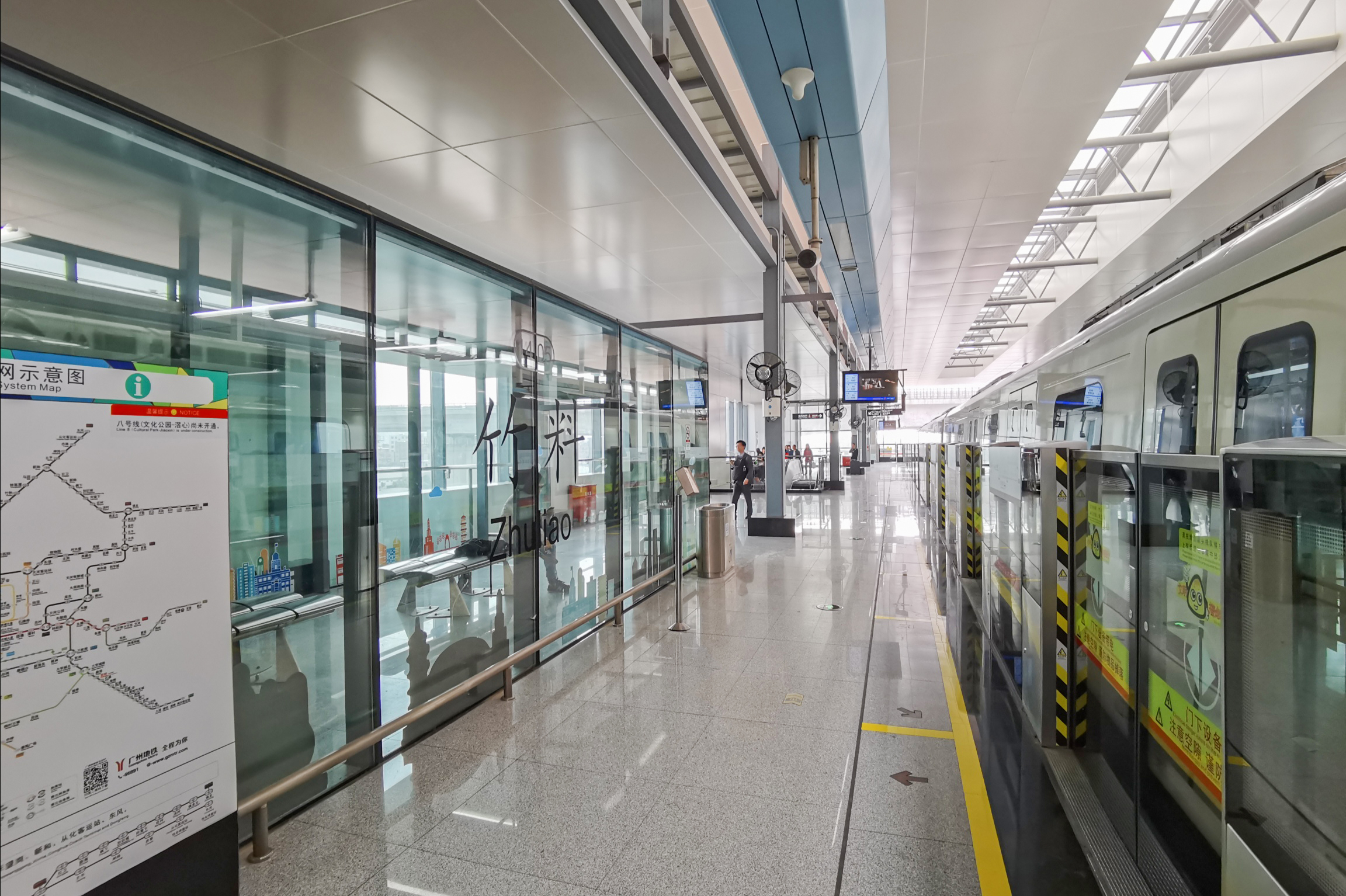
- Platform 1

Chinese name
- Simplified Chinese: 竹料站
- Traditional Chinese: 竹料站
Transcriptions

General information
- Location: Guangcong Highway (G105), Jiaolong Road, Baiyun District, Guangzhou, Guangdong; China
- Coordinates: 23.351247°N 113.362958°E
- Operated by: Guangzhou Metro Co. Ltd.
- Line: Line 14
- Platforms: 2 (2 side platforms)
- Tracks: 2
- Connections: Zhuliao

Construction
- Structure type: Elevated
- Accessible: Yes

Other information
- Station code: 1413

History
- Opened: Line 14: 28 December 2018; 7 years ago

Services
Preceding station	Guangzhou Metro	Following station
Taihe towards Lejia Road	Line 14	Zhongluotan towards Dongfeng
Baiyun Dongping towards Lejia Road	Line 14 Express	Xinhe towards Dongfeng
Transfer at Zhuliao
Preceding station	Pearl River Delta Metropolitan Region Intercity Railway	Following station
Baiyun Airport East towards Huadu	Guangzhou East Ring intercity railway transfer at Zhuliao	Maofengshan towards Panyu
Location

Zhuliao station (Chinese: 竹料站) is an elevated station of Line 14 of the Guangzhou Metro. It started operations on 28 December 2018. The station connects to the Guangzhou East Ring intercity railway.

== Gallery ==
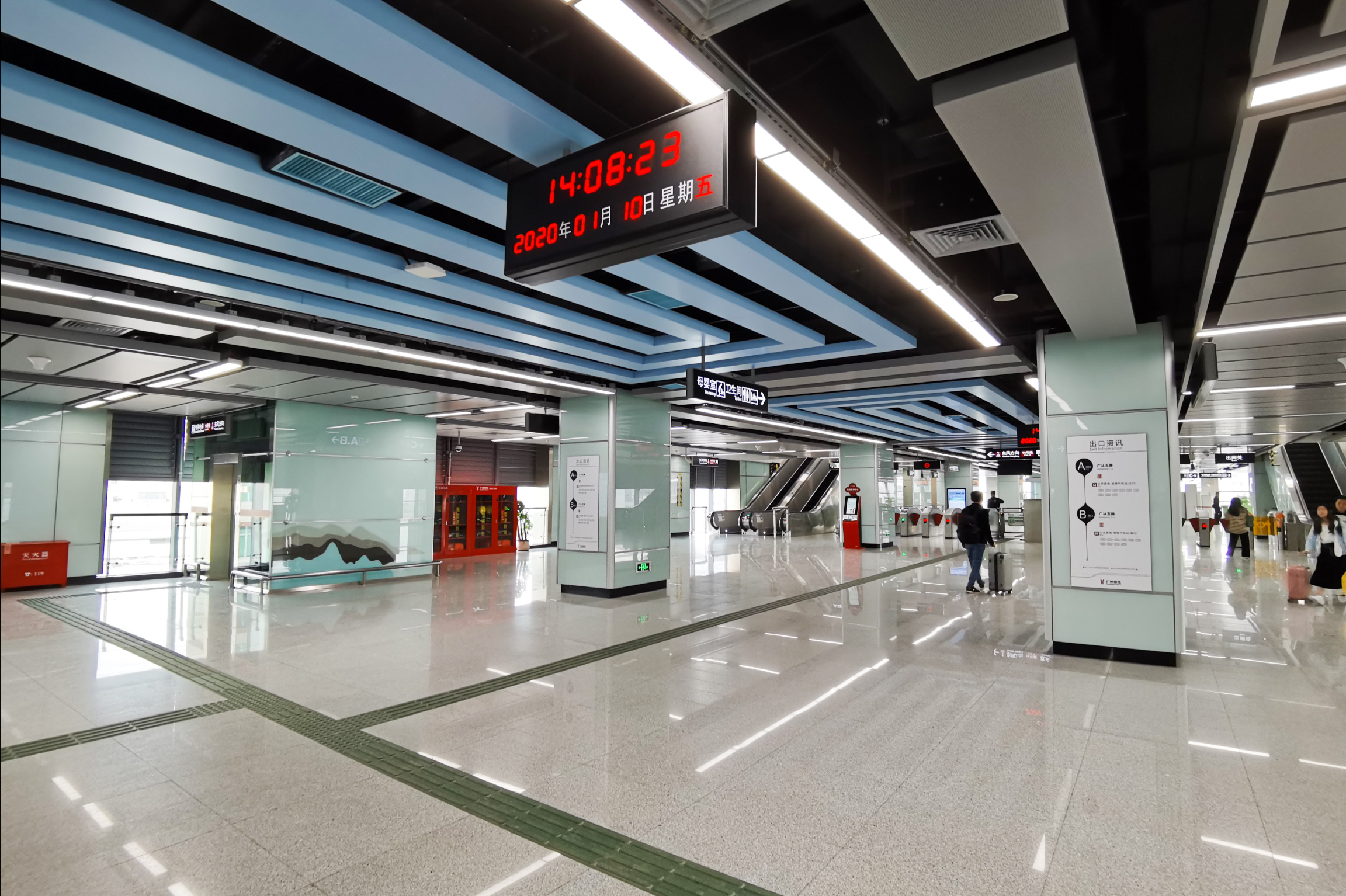
Concourse

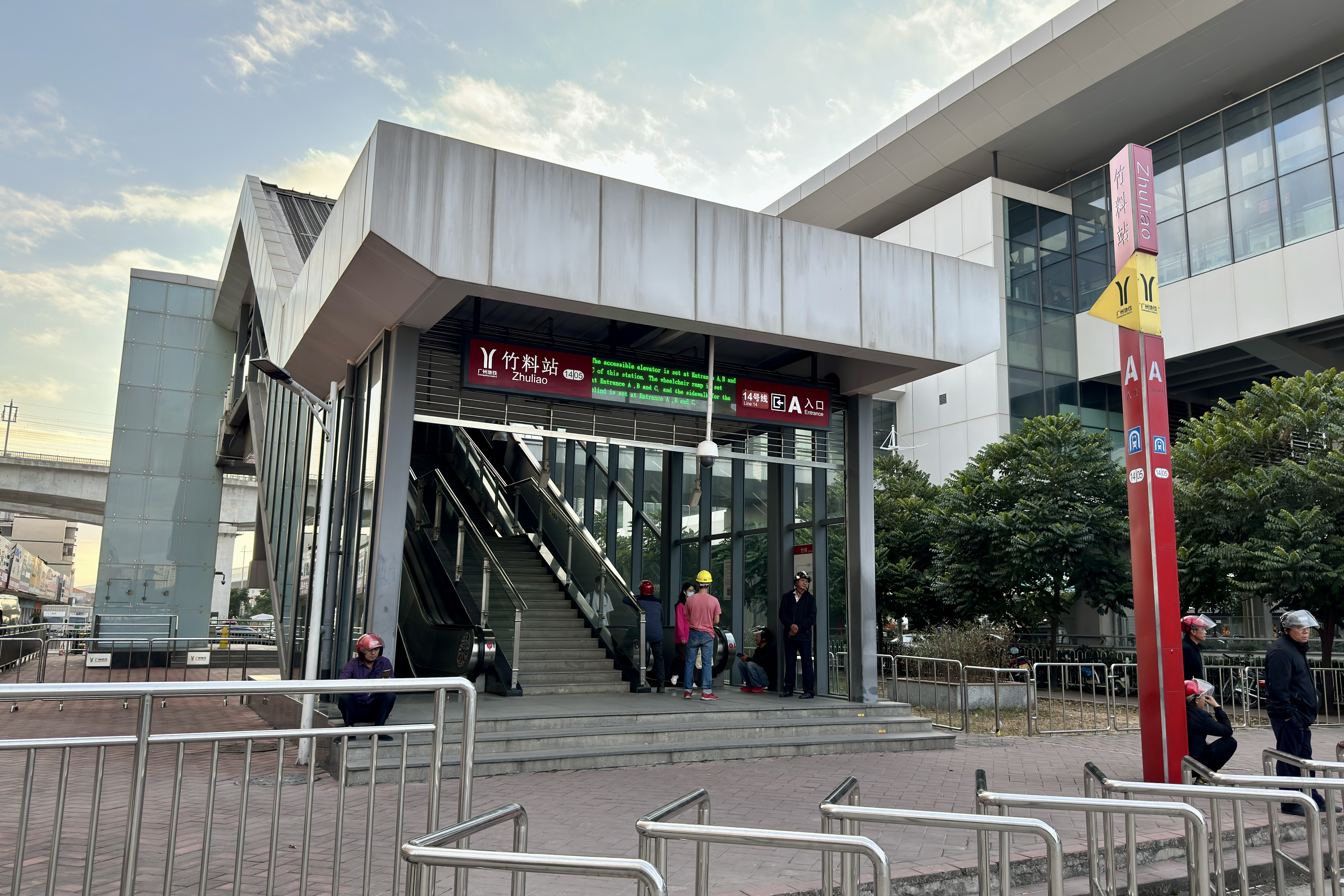
Exit A

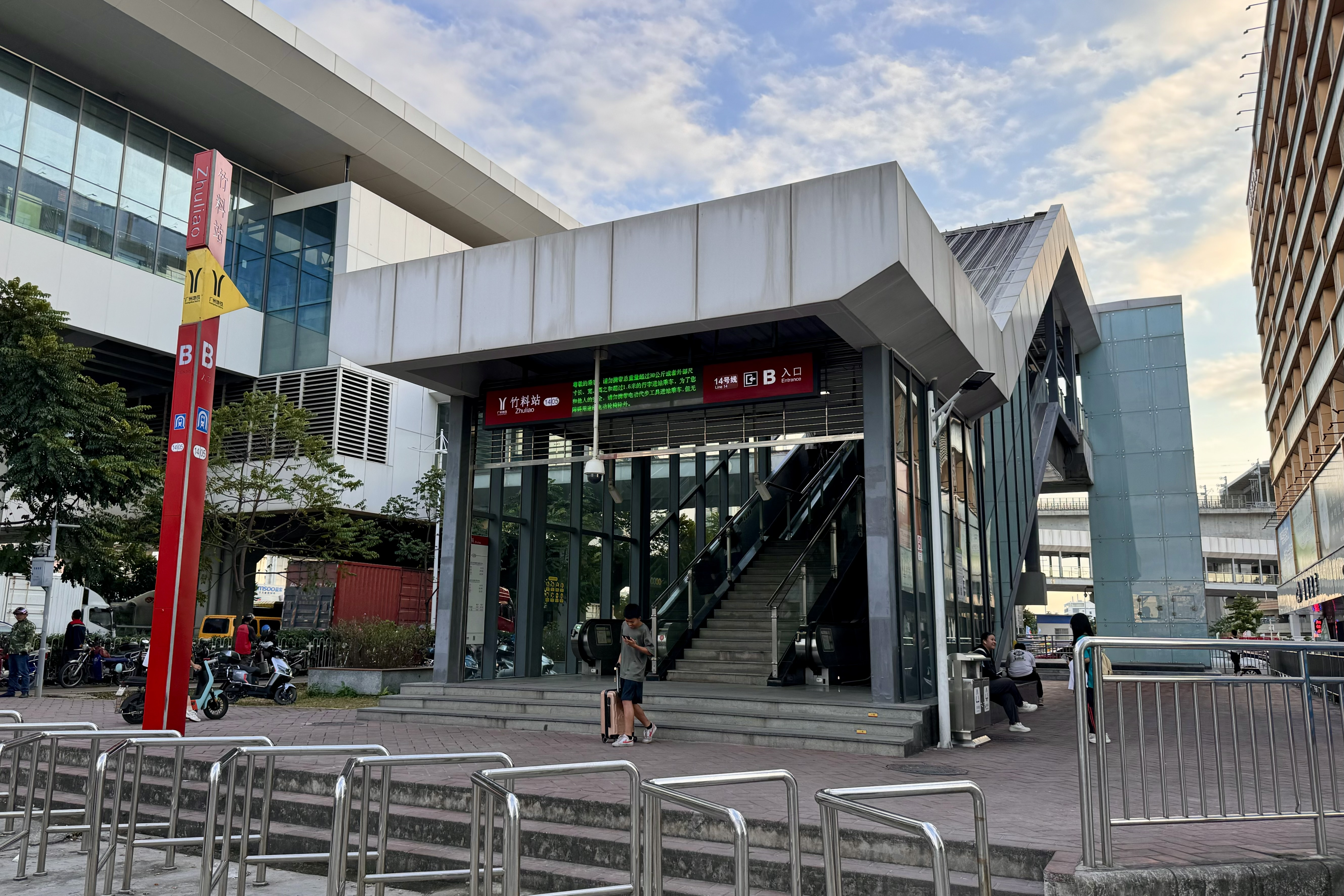
Exit B

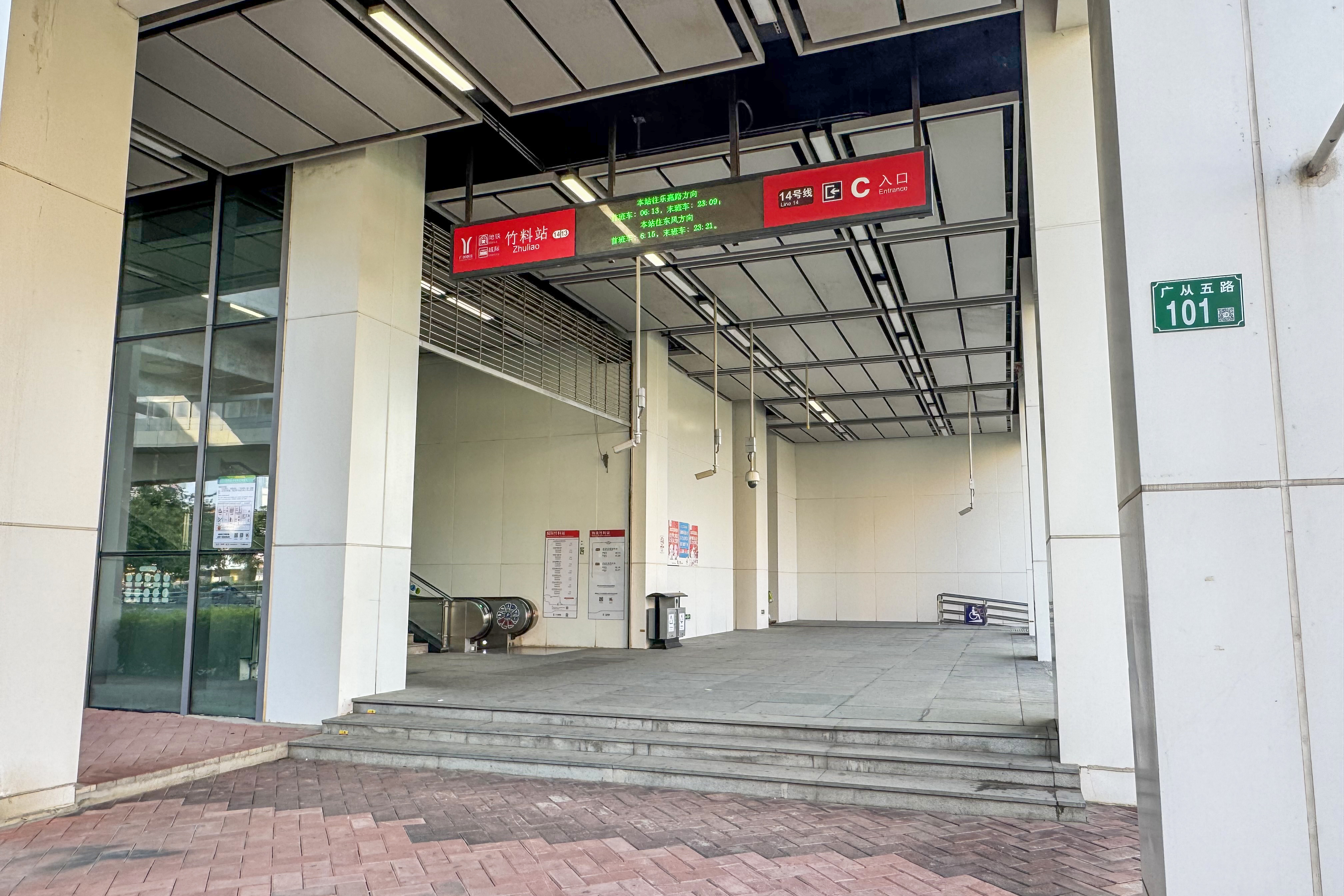
Exit C
