= Zhongluotan East railway station =

Guangdong Intercity railway station in Guangzhou, China

Zhongluotandong 钟落潭东
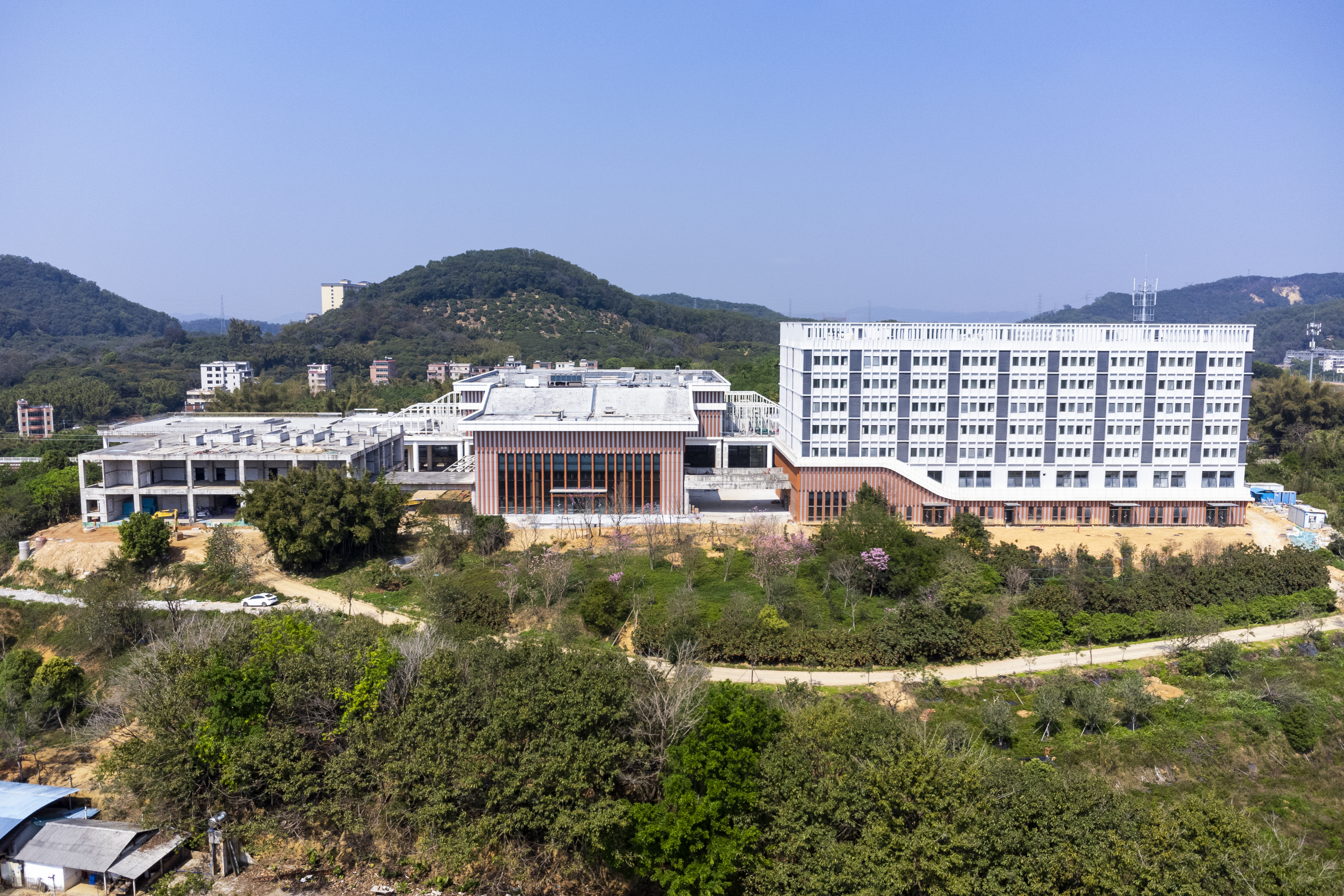
- Exterior (February 2023)

Chinese name
- Simplified Chinese: 钟落潭东站
- Traditional Chinese: 鐘落潭東站
Transcriptions
Standard Mandarin
- Hanyu Pinyin: Zhōngluòtán Dōng Zhàn
Yue: Cantonese
- Yale Romanization: Jūnglohktàahm Dūng Jaahm
- Jyutping: zung1 lok6 taam4 dung1 zaam6

General information
- Location: Border of Baitu Village (白土村) and Madong Village (马洞村), Planned Zhongtai Road (钟太路) Western Link; Zhongluotan, Baiyun District, Guangzhou, Guangdong; China
- Coordinates: 23°21′43.49″N 113°26′21.37″E
- Owner: Pearl River Delta Metropolitan Region intercity railway
- Operator: Guangdong Intercity
- Line: Guangzhou–Shenzhen intercity railway
- Platforms: 2 (2 side platforms)
- Tracks: 4

Construction
- Structure type: At-grade
- Accessible: Yes

Other information
- Station code: ZDA (Pinyin: ZLD)

History
- Opened: 31 July 2026 (3 months ago)

Services
Preceding station	Pearl River Delta Metropolitan Region Intercity Railway	Following station
Zhuliao Terminus	Guangzhou–Shenzhen intercity railway	Jiufo towards Shenzhen Airport
Location

Zhongluotan East railway station (Chinese: 钟落潭东站; pinyin: Zhōngluòtán Dōng Zhàn; Cantonese Yale: Jūnglohktàahm Dūng Jaahm) is a railway station on Suishen intercity railway located in Baiyun District, Guangzhou, Guangdong, China. It opened on 31 July 2026.

== Features ==
The station has two above-ground floors with a total area of approximately 23000 square meters. The station building's design theme is "A Single Tree Becomes a Forest", incorporating elements of banyan trees. A dormitory and public security complex was built on the southeast side of the station.

There are two at-grade side platforms with two passing tracks.

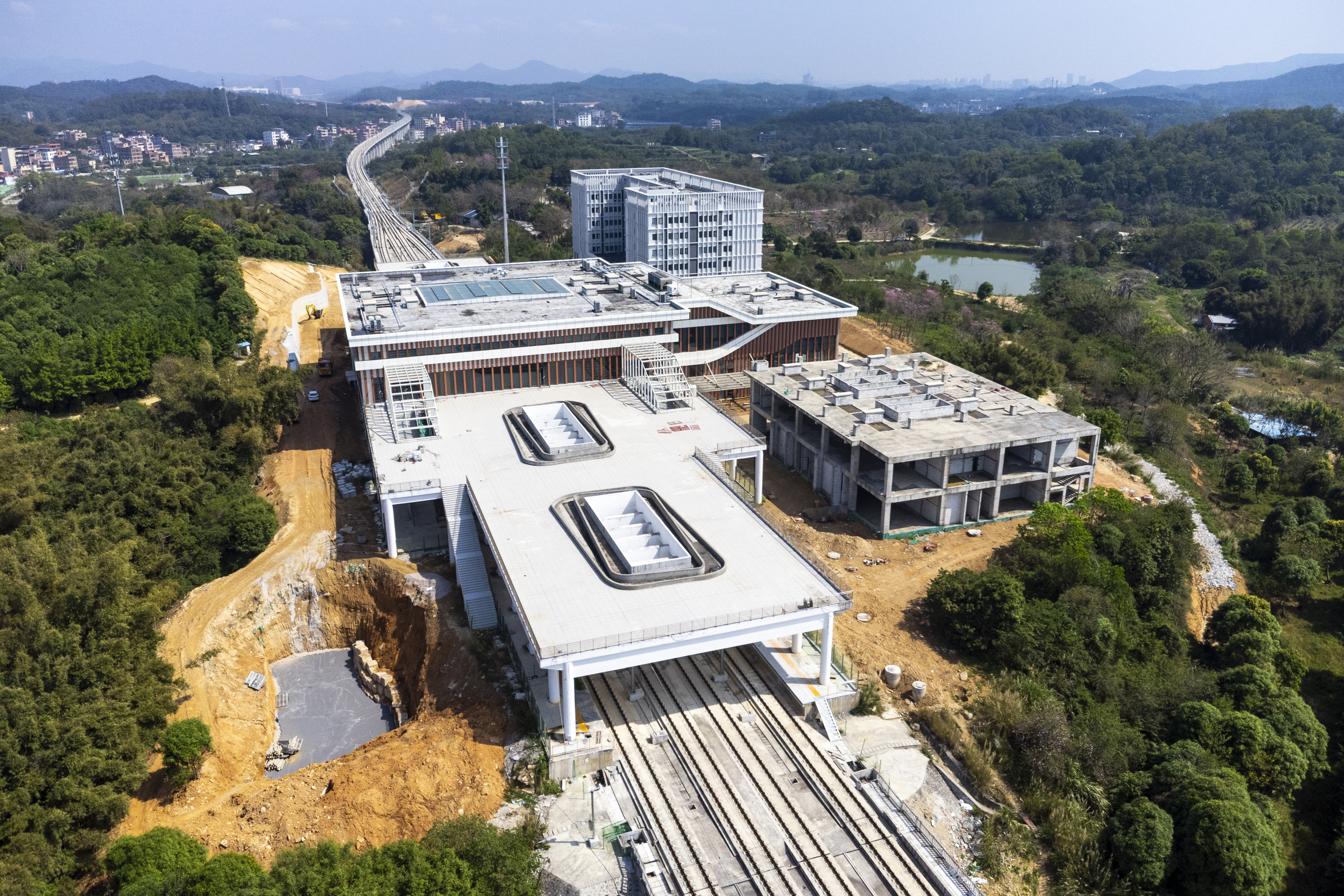
Station and track under construction (February 2023)

Concourse

Platform 2

=== Entrances/exits ===
The station has a single point of entry/exit.

- B: Zhanqian Road
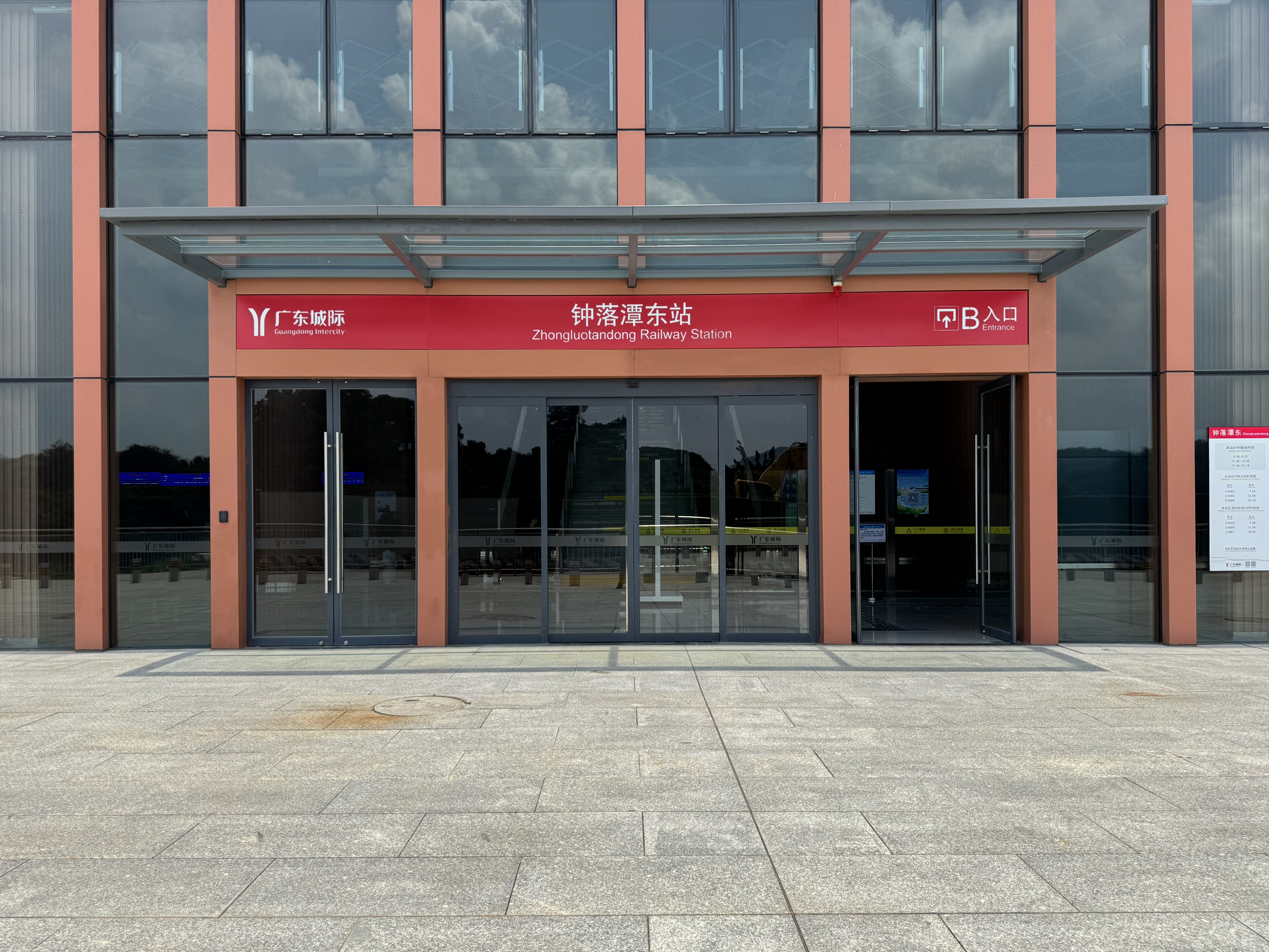
Entrance B

== Usage ==
Although the station is planned to serve the Beautiful Health Industry Park of the Guangzhou Private Science and Technology Park, and there are also many colleges and universities to the north, the location is not yet fully developed, and the connecting roads have not yet been completed. In the early days of operation, only one pair of trains stopped at each station in the morning, noon and evening. After the timetable was adjusted on 19 September 2026, it became two pairs of trains stopping at each station in the morning, noon and evening, and all other trains did not stop at the station.

== History ==
During planning and construction, the station was called Health and Industry City station (健康产业城). On 2 February 2021, it was officially named Zhongluotandong (East) station.

The station started construction in April 2019, and the station structure topped out in August 2020.

On 31 July 2026, the station opened with the northern extension of the Suishen intercity railway.
