= Maofengshan railway station =

Guangdong Intercity railway station in Guangzhou, China

Maofengshan 帽峰山
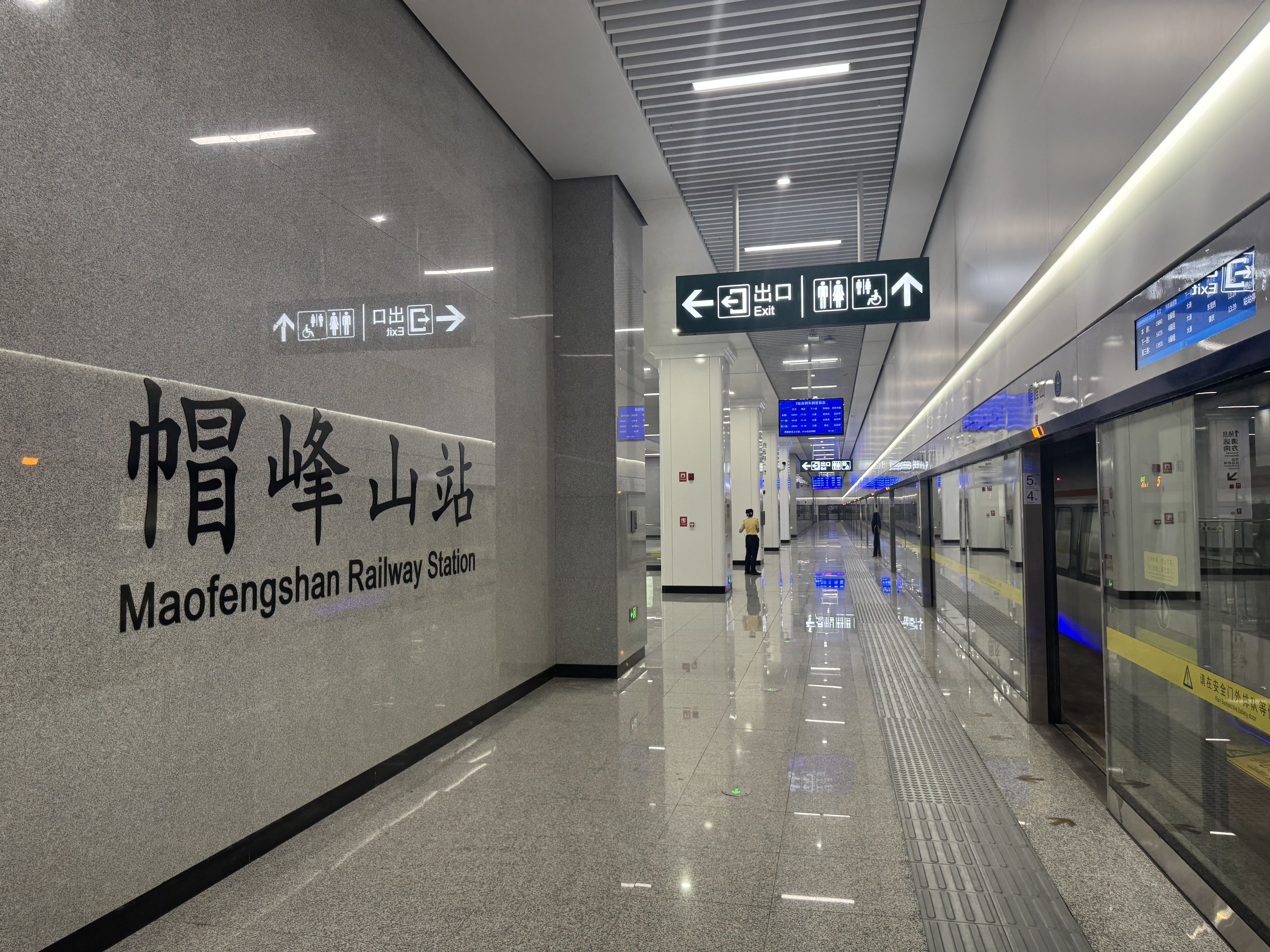
- Platform

Chinese name
- Chinese: 帽峰山站
Transcriptions
Standard Mandarin
- Hanyu Pinyin: Màofēngshān Zhàn
Yue: Cantonese
- Yale Romanization: Moufūngsāan Jaahm
- Jyutping: Mou^{6}fung^{1}saan^{1} Zaam^{6}

General information
- Location: Shating Village (沙亭村) on the south side of Shating West Road (沙亭西路) and west side of Chaoliang North Road (朝亮北路); Taihe Subdistrict, Baiyun District, Guangzhou, Guangdong; China
- Coordinates: 23°18′40.10″N 113°21′50.90″E
- Owner: Pearl River Delta Metropolitan Region intercity railway
- Operator: Guangdong Intercity
- Line: Guangzhou East Ring intercity railway
- Platforms: 2 (2 side platforms)
- Tracks: 2

Construction
- Structure type: Underground
- Accessible: Yes

Other information
- Station code: MTQ (Pinyin: MFS)

History
- Opened: 29 September 2025 (10 months ago)

Services
Preceding station	Pearl River Delta Metropolitan Region Intercity Railway	Following station
Zhuliao towards Huadu	Guangzhou East Ring intercity railway	Dayuan towards Panyu
Location

Maofengshan railway station (Chinese: 帽峰山站; pinyin: Màofēngshān Zhàn; Cantonese Yale: Moufūngsāan Jaahm) is an underground railway station on Guangzhou East Ring intercity railway located in Baiyun District, Guangzhou, Guangdong, China. It opened on 29 September 2025. The station name comes from the nearby Maofeng Mountain Forest Park.

== Features ==
The station has 2 underground side platforms. The station also has two wind shafts and a cooling tower. On the west side of the station, there is a sunken square.

=== Entrances/exits ===
The station has 4 points of entry/exit, of which Exits A and B are located in the sunken square and share a passage in and out of the concourse.

- A: Ziye Road Middle
- B: Ziye Road Middle
- ~~C~~: (Not open)
- ~~D~~: (Not open)
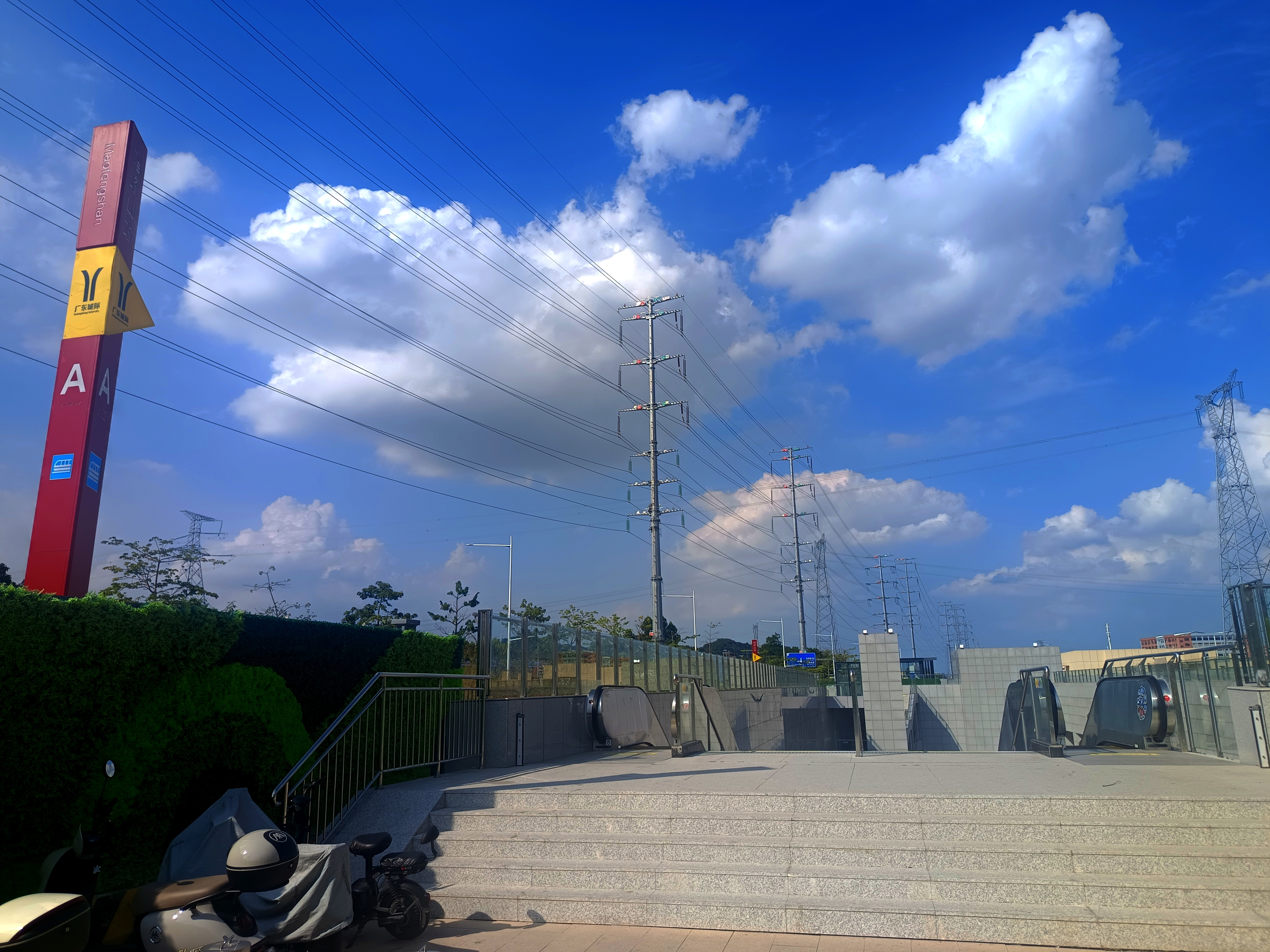
Entrance A

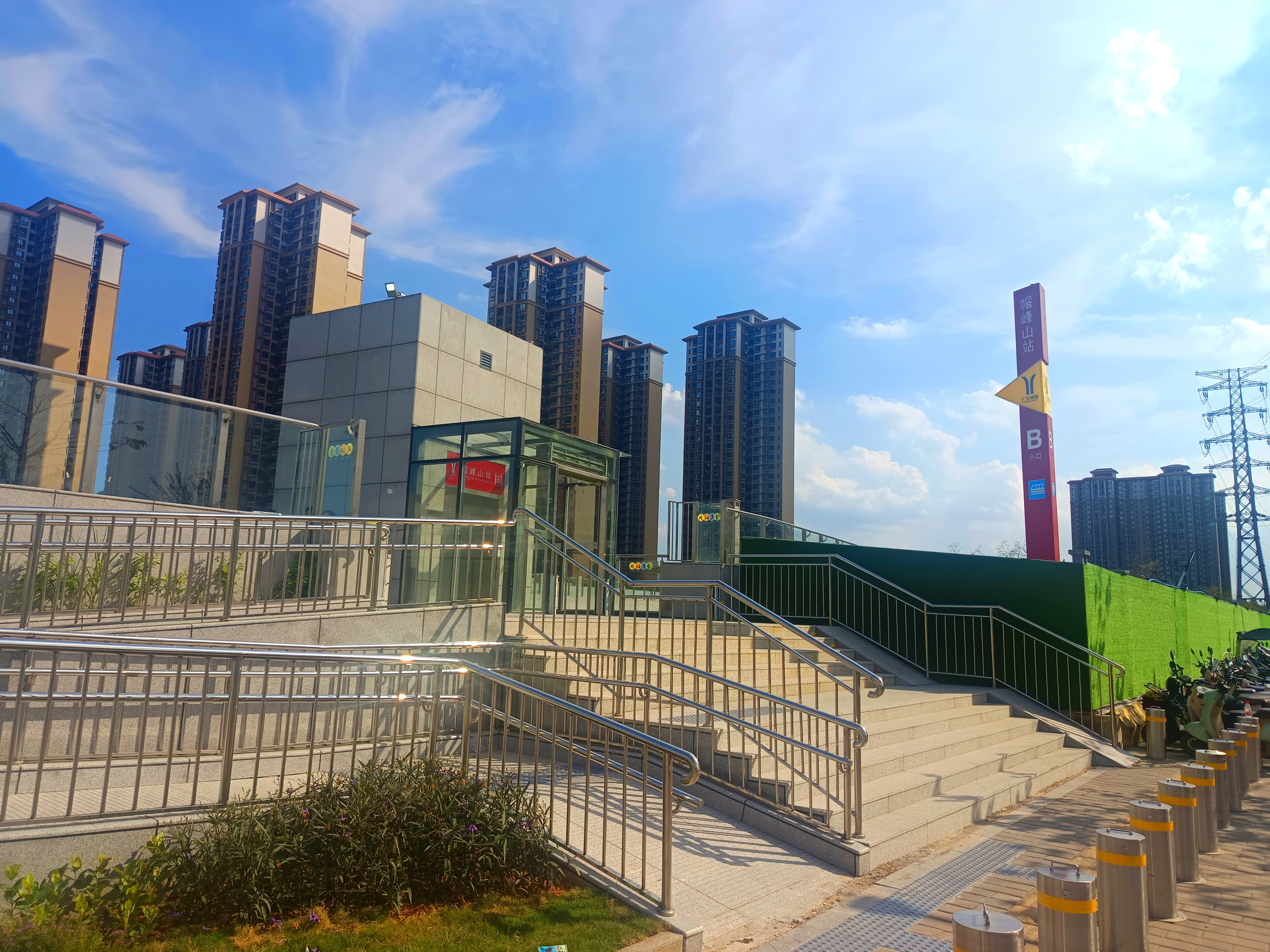
Entrance B

== Gallery ==
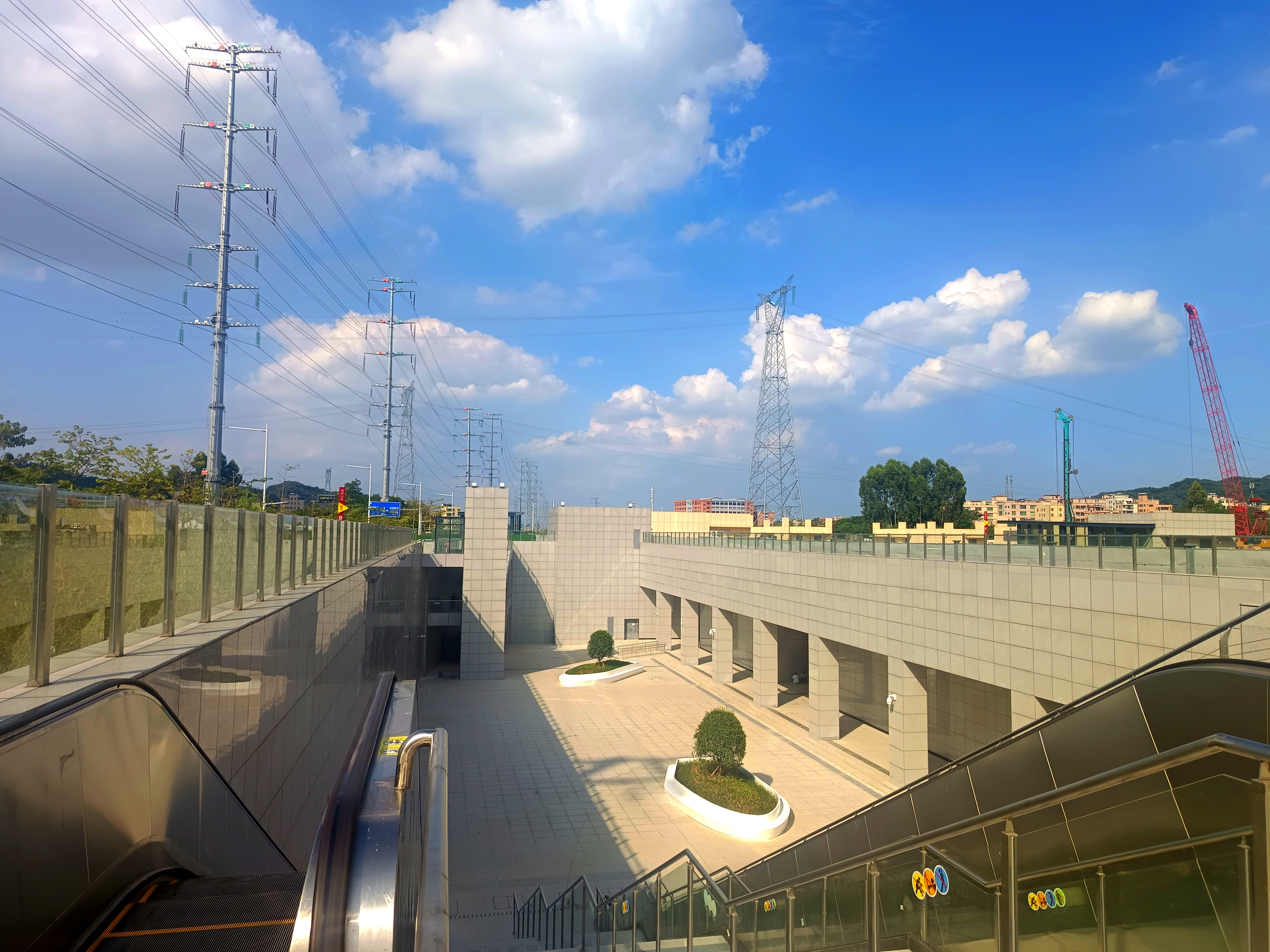
Sunken square

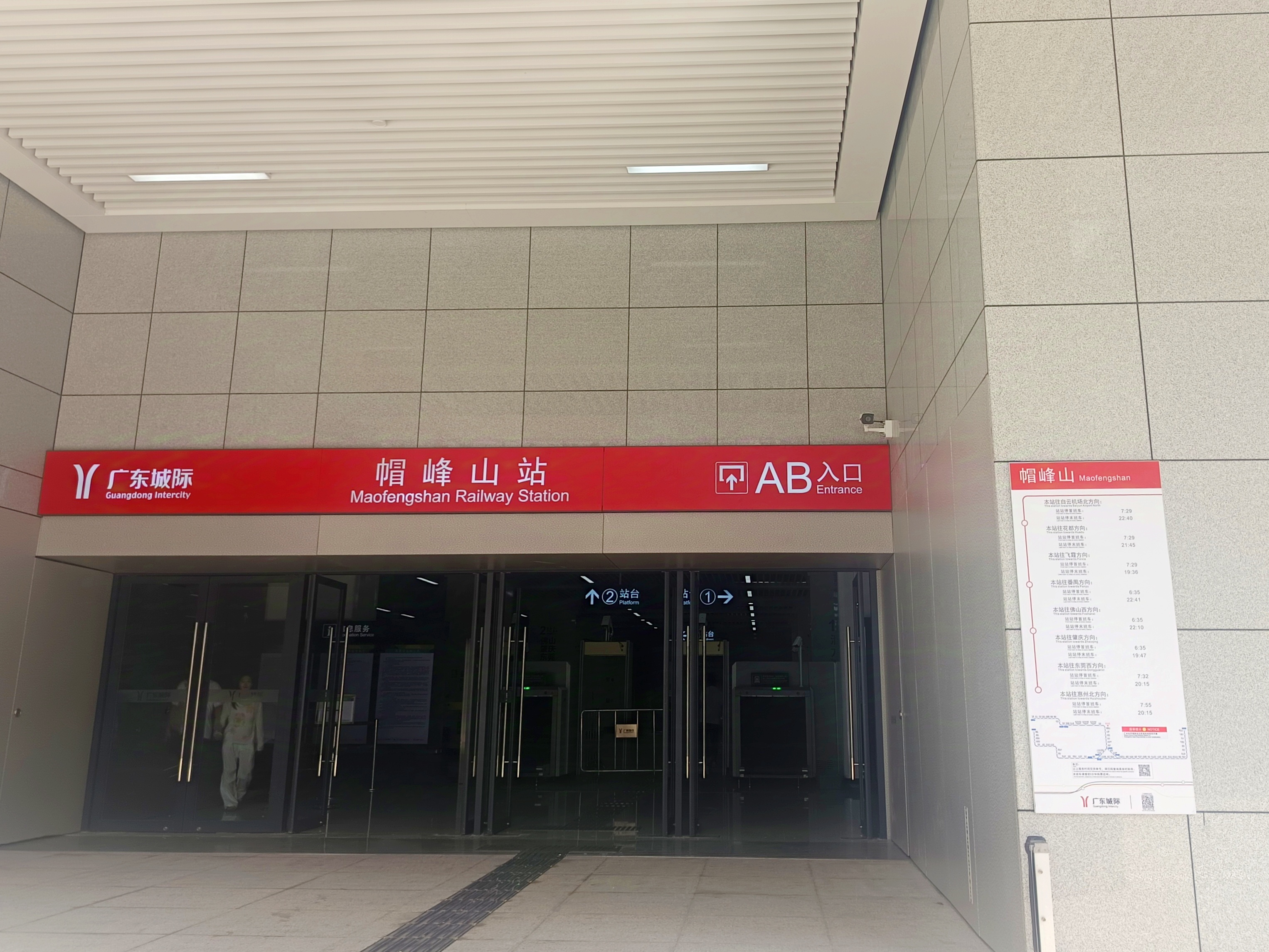
Exits A and B shared entry/exit passage

== History ==
In the EIA announcement of the Guangzhou East Ring intercity railway announced in 2015, there is a Taihe station set up in Taihe, which is an elevated station. Later, in the bidding documents approved by the Guangdong Provincial Development and Reform Commission in November 2016, all stations of the Guangzhou-Foshan East Ring elevated section were adjusted to underground stations, and thus the station was adjusted to an underground station.

On 24 April 2020, construction of the underground diaphragm wall was completed. On 10 November the same year, the first floor of the main structure was poured.

On 25 November 2024, the station successfully transmitted power.

Due to the existence of a station with the same name on the Chengdu–Kunming railway, the station was named Maofengshan station after the Maofeng Mountain Forest Park near the station before opening. In May 2025, the station completed the "three rights" transfer.

On 29 September 2025, the station opened.
