= Baiyun Airport East railway station =

Guangdong Intercity railway station in Guangzhou, China

Baiyun Airport East 白云机场东
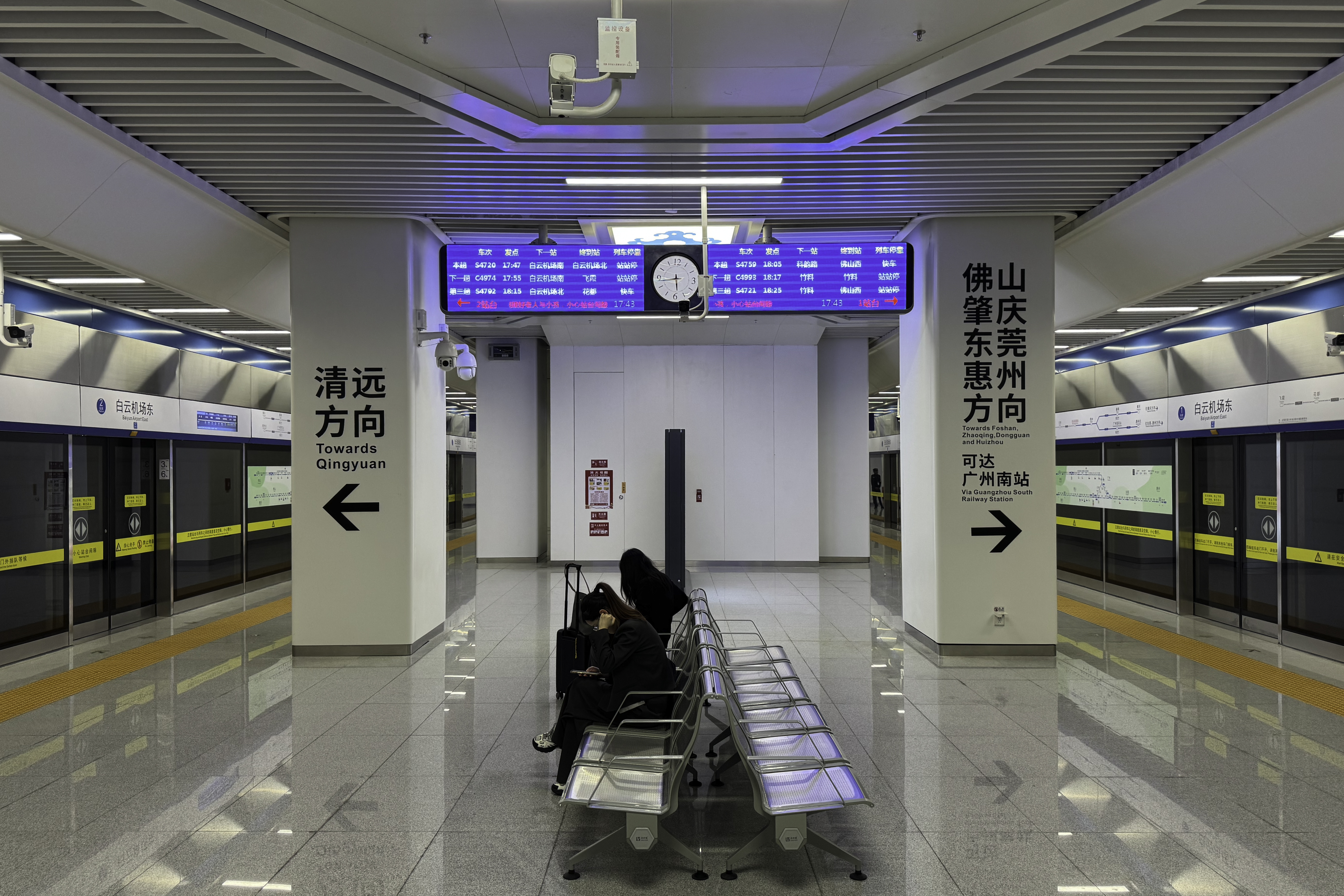
- Platform

Chinese name
- Simplified Chinese: 白云机场东站
- Traditional Chinese: 白雲機場東站
Transcriptions
Standard Mandarin
- Hanyu Pinyin: Báiyún Jīchǎng Dōng Zhàn
Yue: Cantonese
- Yale Romanization: Baahk'wàhn Gēichèuhng Dūng Jaahm
- Jyutping: Baak^{6}wan^{4} Gei^{1}coeng^{4} Dung^{1} Zaam^{6}

General information
- Location: Guangzhou Baiyun International Airport Terminal 3 Gound Transportation Center; Renhe, Baiyun District, Guangzhou, Guangdong; China
- Coordinates: 23°22′2.701″N 113°18′50.360″E
- Owner: Pearl River Delta Metropolitan Region intercity railway
- Operator: Guangdong Intercity
- Line: Guangzhou East Ring intercity railway
- Platforms: 2 (1 island platform)
- Tracks: 2
- Connections: Guangzhou Baiyun International Airport (Terminal 3)

Construction
- Structure type: Underground
- Accessible: Yes

Other information
- Station code: BDA (Pinyin: BYD)

History
- Opened: 30 October 2025 (9 months ago)

Services
Preceding station	Pearl River Delta Metropolitan Region Intercity Railway	Following station
Baiyun Airport North towards Huadu	Guangzhou East Ring intercity railway	Zhuliao towards Panyu
Location

Baiyun Airport East railway station (Chinese: 白云机场东站; pinyin: Báiyún Jīchǎng Dōng Zhàn; Cantonese Yale: Baahk'wàhn Gēichèuhng Dūng Jaahm) is an underground railway station on Guangzhou East Ring intercity railway located in Baiyun District, Guangzhou, Guangdong, China. It is located underneath the ground transportation center of Terminal 3 of Guangzhou Baiyun International Airport. It opened on 30 October 2025 in tandem with Terminal 3 of the Guangzhou Baiyun International Airport.

Because this station is connected to Baiyun Airport Terminal 3, "Terminal 3" is marked in parentheses on passenger interfaces such as route maps to remind passengers.

== Features ==
The station has an underground island platform. The public area of the concourse uses "Airplane Set Sail" as a dynamic image and is equipped with a dynamic streamlined ceiling design. The walls are decorated with golden waves, highlighting the characteristics of the "Silk Road Golden Tide". The ground paving is decorated with the Beijing Road Ancient Road site as a reference, and the landscape staircase creates a sense of spatial depth through LED dynamic display and color-changing light boxes.

=== Entrances/exits ===
The station has 2 points of entry/exit, both are located on the second floor of the transportation center of Terminal 3 of Guangzhou Baiyun International Airport.

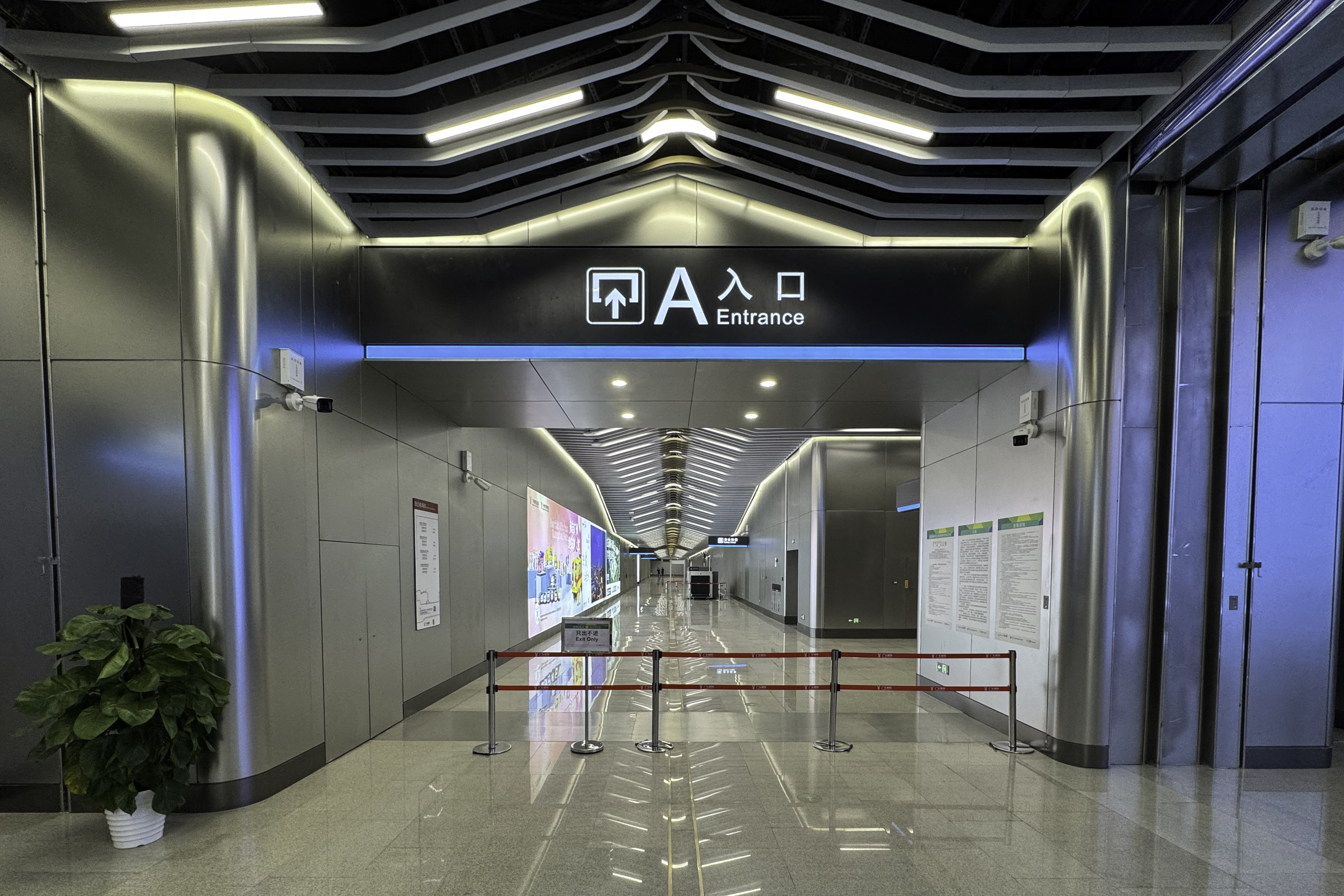
Entrance A

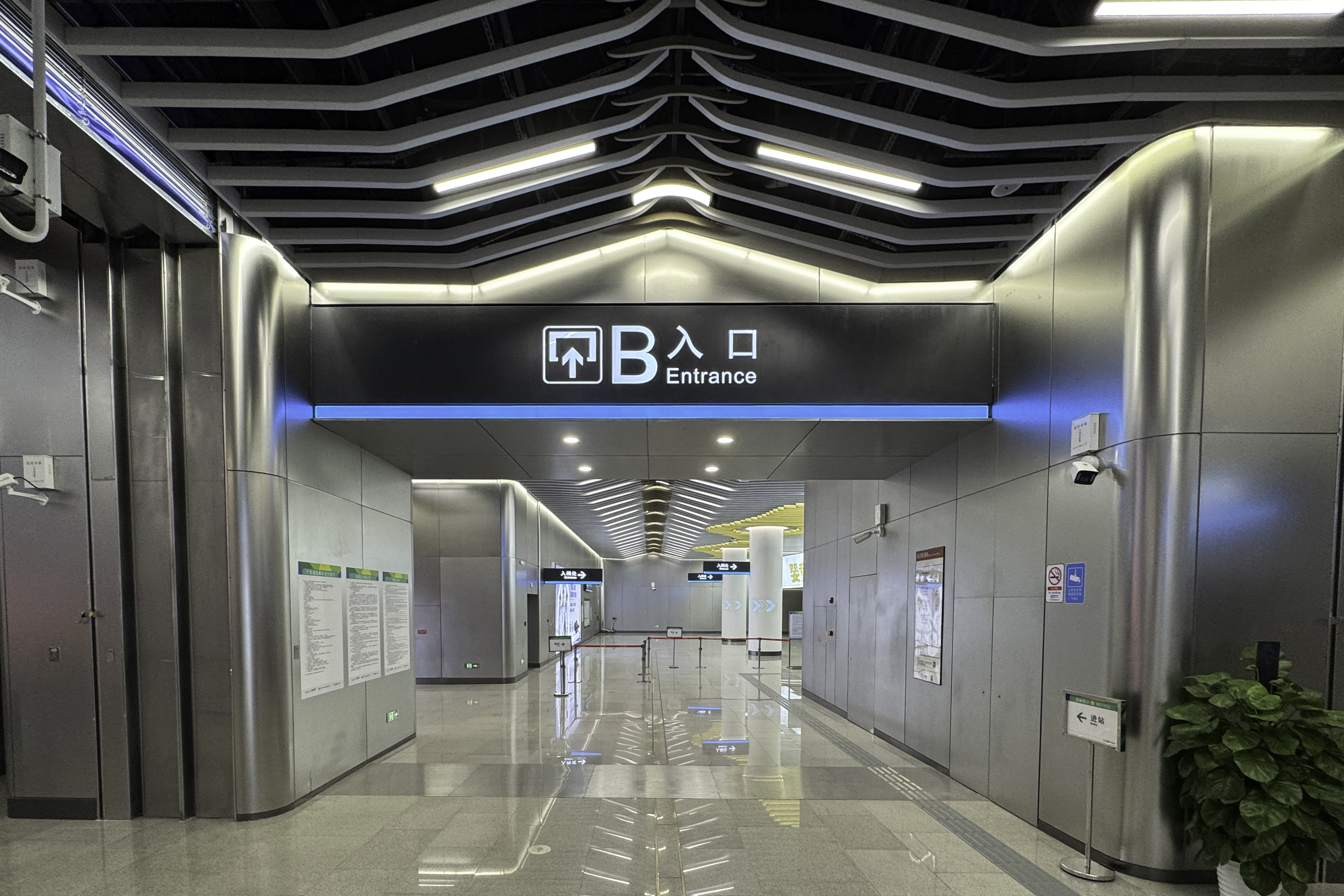
Entrance B

== History ==
The station was called Airport Terminal 3 station during the planning and construction phase. It was renamed to Baiyun Airport East station on 2 February 2021.

The main structure topped out on 12 October 2018.

At 12:00 on 30 October 2025, the station officially opened.

== Transfer ==
Other than the Xinbaiguang intercity railway, the station will incorporate the northern extension of Line 22, (Fangbai Intercity), and also the under planning Guangzhou–Zhuhai–Macao high speed railway and Guangzhou–Heyuan high-speed railway. In the future, passengers can not only go to the airport from this station, but also transfer to other metro lines to Guangzhou and even various parts of Guangdong Province. At present, this station, together with the Airport East station of Guangzhou Metro Line 22 and the Baiyun Airport High-speed Rail station, constitute the "Baiyun Airport T3 Transportation Hub Rail Transit Reserved Project".

== Gallery ==
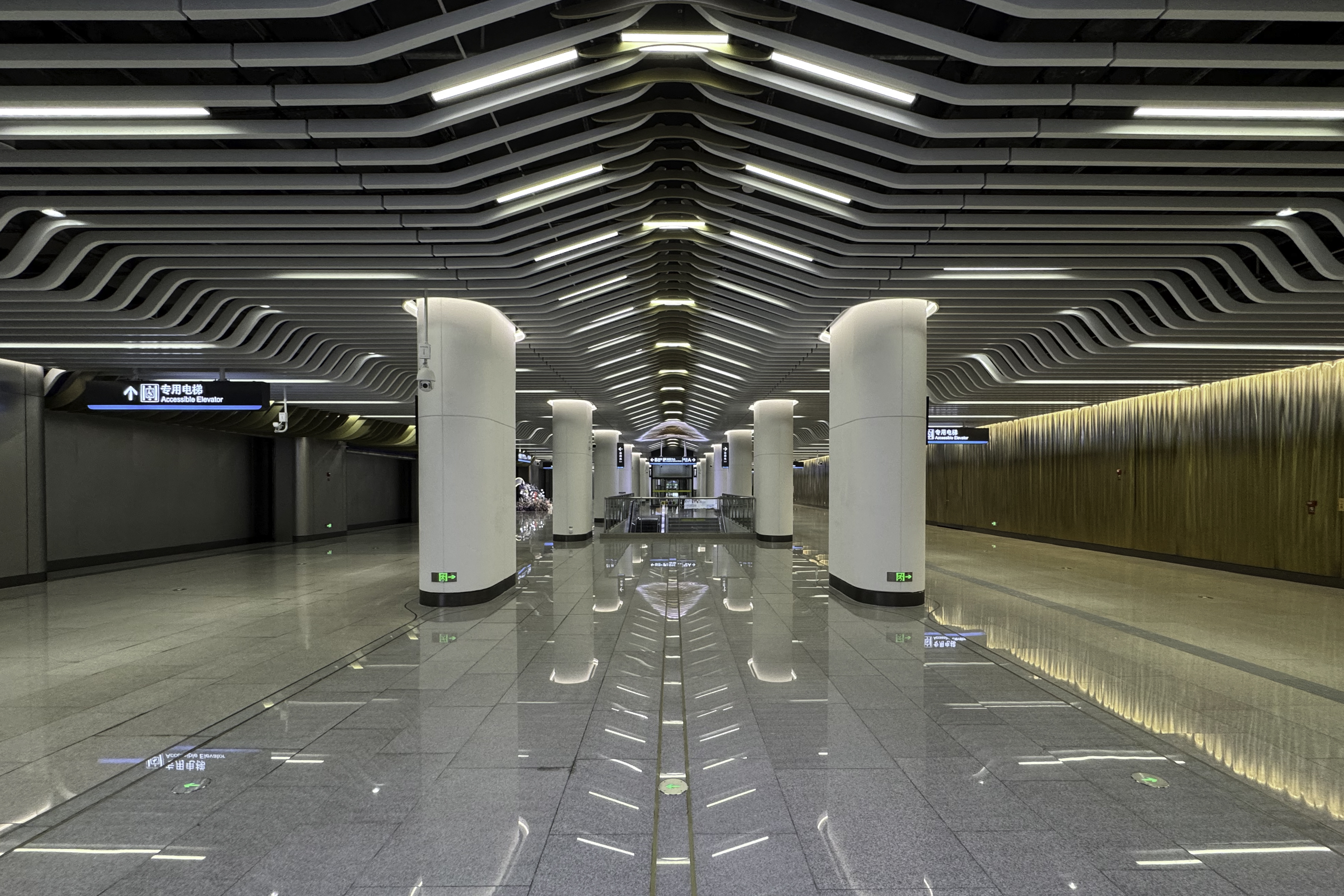
Concourse

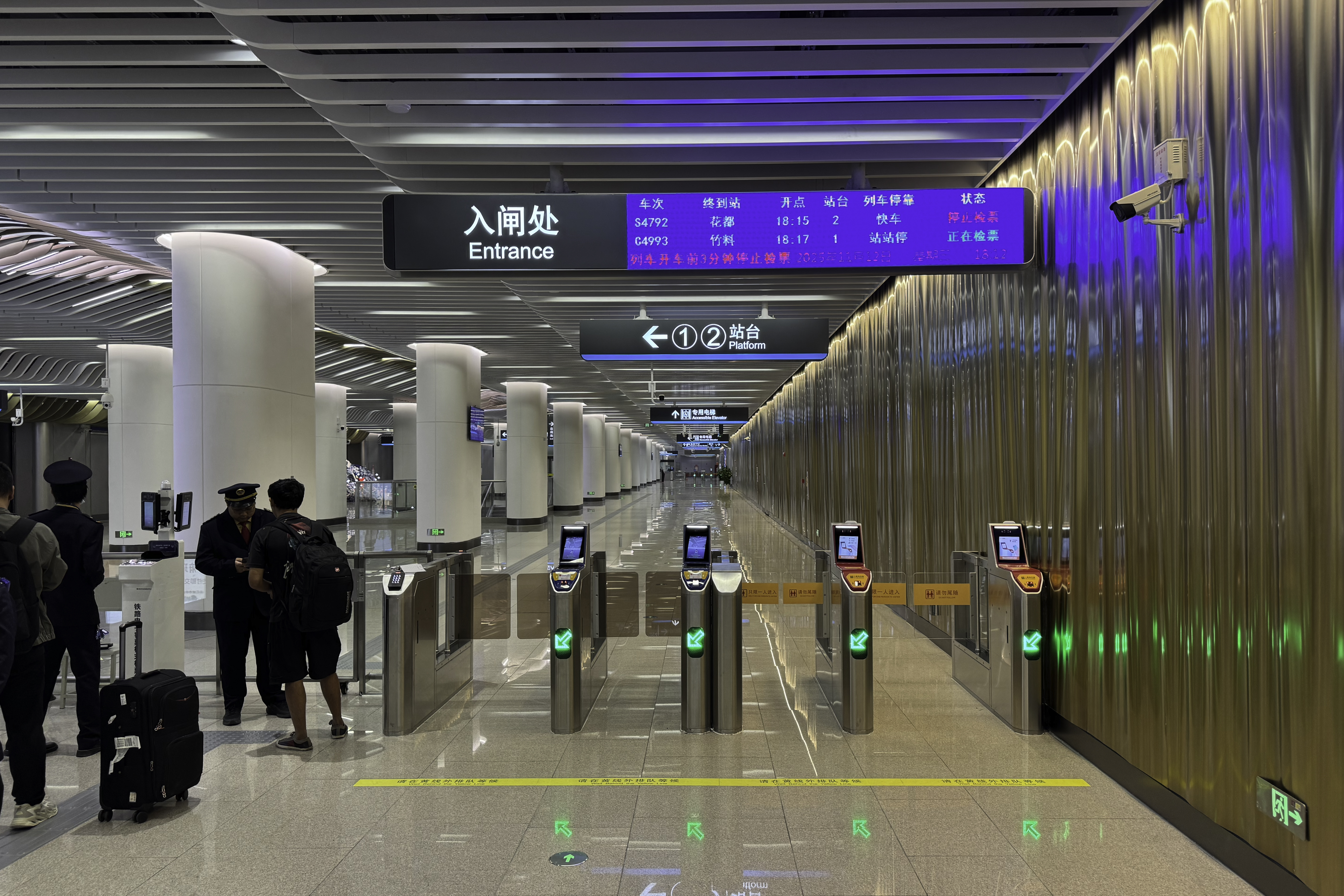
Entry faregates
