= Taihe, Guangzhou =

Taihe 太和镇
- Town
- Location in Guangdong
- Coordinates: 23°17′38″N 113°21′11″E
- Country: People's Republic of China
- Province: Guangdong
- Prefecture-level city: Guangzhou
- District: Baiyun District
- Time zone: UTC+8 (China Standard)

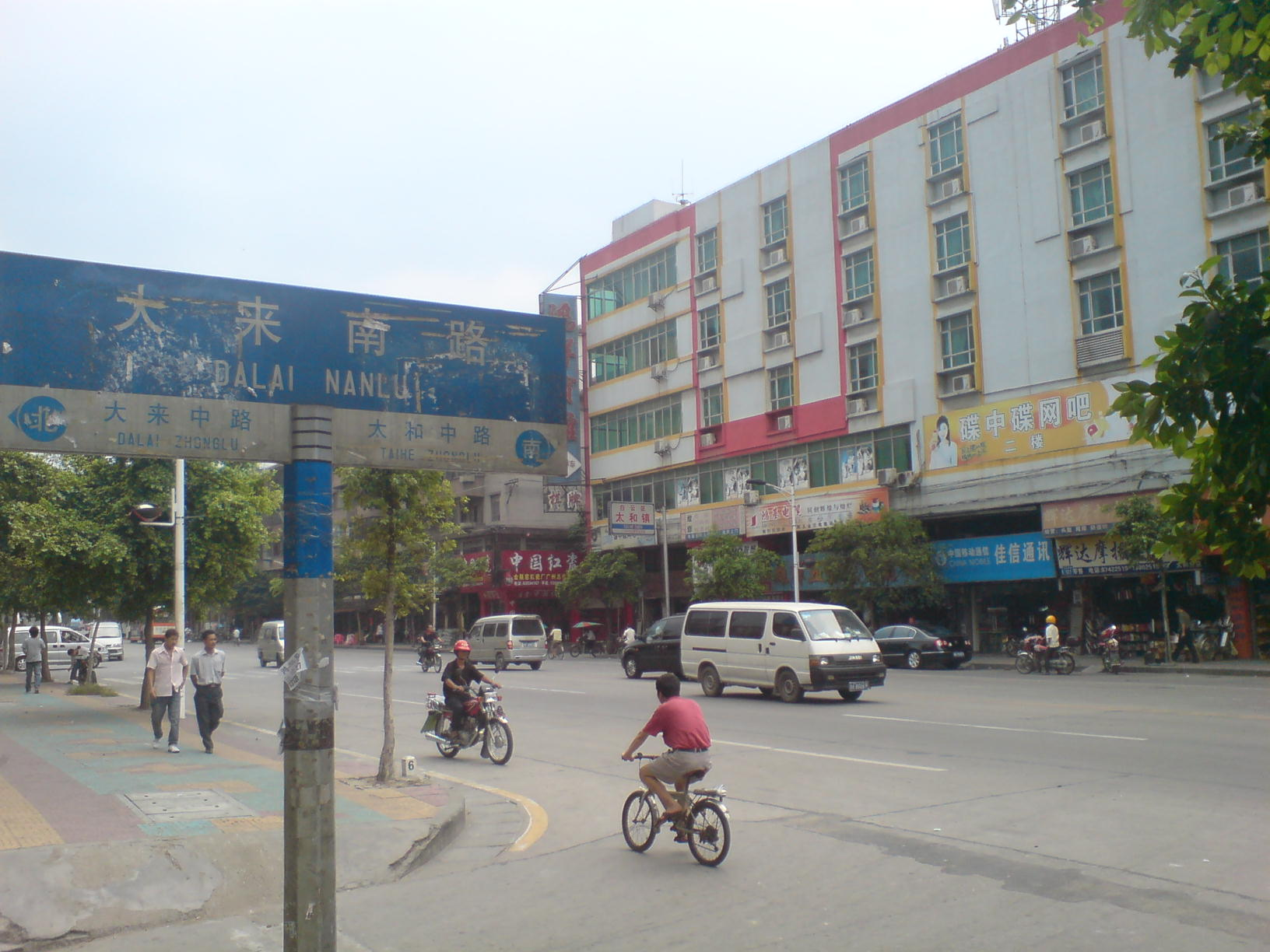
A scene of Taihe Town, Baiyun District, Guangzhou

Taihe (Chinese: 太和; pinyin: Tàihé) is a town under the administration of Baiyun District, Guangzhou, Guangdong, China. As of 2020, it administers the following three residential neighborhoods and 12 villages:

Neighborhoods

- Heshan Community (和珊社区)
- Liansheng Community (联升社区)
- Fengtai Community (丰泰社区)

Villages

- Xingfeng Village (兴丰村)
- Suifeng Village (穗丰村)
- Baishan Village (白山村)
- Helong Village (和龙村)
- Toubei Village (头陂村)
- Shating Village (沙亭村)
- Dali Village (大沥村)
- Xiejiazhuang Village (谢家庄村)
- Yingxi Village (营溪村)
- Caozhuang Village (草庄村)
- Tianxin Village (田心村)
