= Zhuliao railway station =

Guangdong Intercity railway station in Guangzhou, China

Zhuliao 竹料
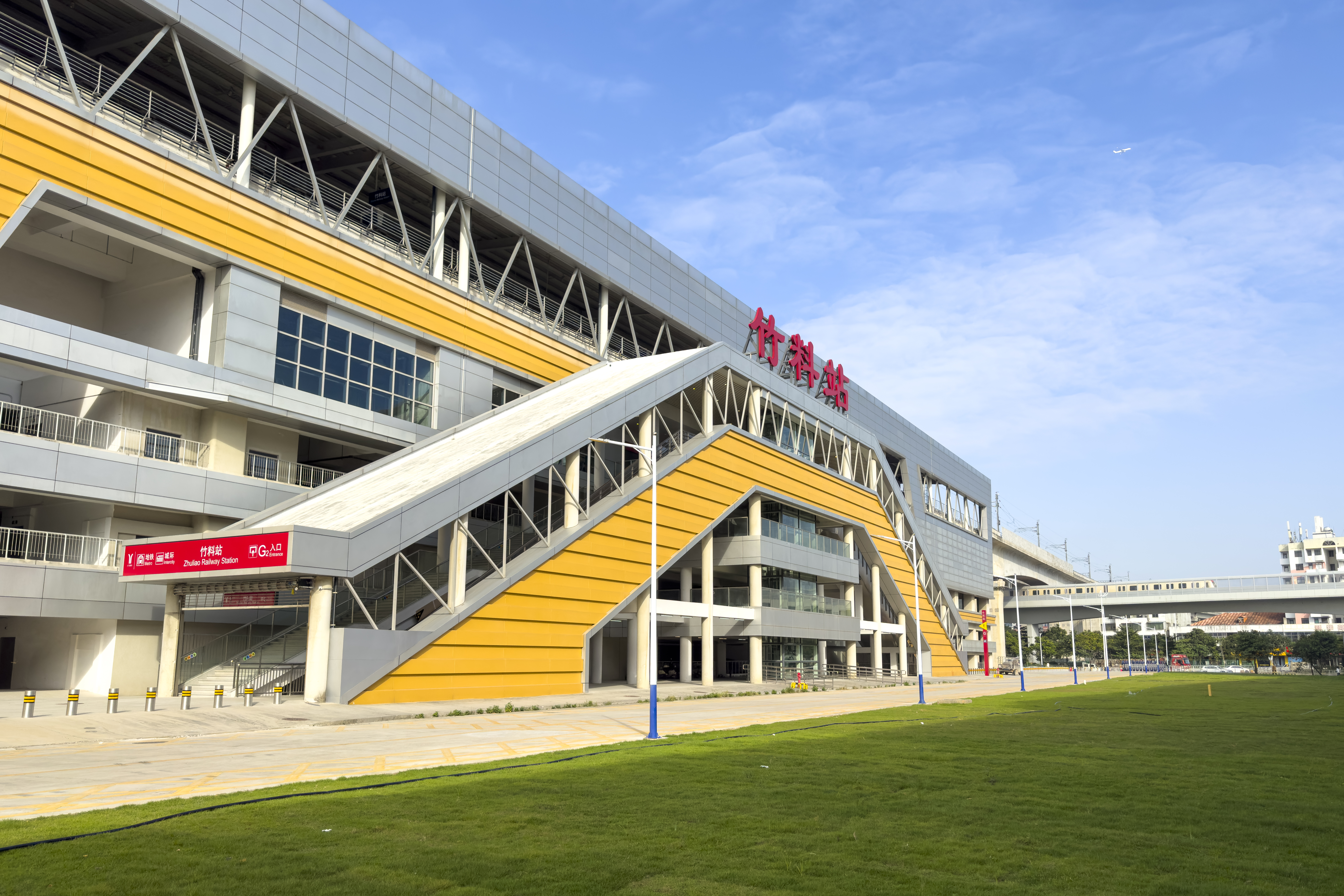
- Exterior

Chinese name
- Chinese: 竹料站
Transcriptions
Standard Mandarin
- Hanyu Pinyin: Zhúliào Zhàn
Yue: Cantonese
- Yale Romanization: Jūkliuh Jaahm
- Jyutping: Zuk^{1}liu^{2} Zaam^{6}

General information
- Location: Intersection of Dagangling Jiaolong Road (大纲领角隆路) and Guangcong Highway (广从公路); Zhongluotan, Baiyun District, Guangzhou, Guangdong; China
- Coordinates: 23°21′1.48″N 113°21′37.73″E
- Owner: Pearl River Delta Metropolitan Region intercity railway
- Operator: Guangdong Intercity
- Lines: Guangzhou East Ring intercity railway Guangzhou–Shenzhen intercity railway
- Platforms: 4 (2 island platforms)
- Tracks: 4
- Connections: 14 Zhuliao

Construction
- Structure type: Elevated
- Accessible: Yes

Other information
- Station code: ZUA (Pinyin: ZHL)

History
- Opened: 29 September 2025 (13 months ago)

Services
Preceding station	Pearl River Delta Metropolitan Region Intercity Railway	Following station
through to Guangzhou East Ring intercity railway	Guangzhou–Shenzhen intercity railway	Zhongluotan East towards Shenzhen Airport
Baiyun Airport East towards Huadu	Guangzhou East Ring intercity railway	Maofengshan towards Panyu
Transfer at Zhuliao
Preceding station	Guangzhou Metro	Following station
Taihe towards Lejia Road	Line 14 transfer at Zhuliao	Zhongluotan towards Dongfeng or Zhenlong
Location

Zhuliao railway station (Chinese: 竹料站; pinyin: Zhúliào Zhàn; Cantonese Yale: Jūkliuh Jaahm) is a railway interchange station between Guangzhou East Ring intercity railway and Suishen intercity railway located in Baiyun District, Guangzhou, Guangdong, China. It opened on 29 September 2025.

== Features ==
The station has a pair of elevated island platforms. There is also an interchange passage toward the nearby Line 14 station.

=== Layout ===
F5; Platforms	Platform 1	East Ring towards Foshan West, Dongguan West, Zhaoqing or Huizhou North (Maofengshan)
F5; Platforms	Island platform, doors will open on the left or right
F5; Platforms	Platform 2	East Ring towards Huadu, Baiyun Airport North or Feixia (Baiyun Airport East); SS towards Shenzhen Airport (Zhongluotan East)
F5; Platforms	Platform 3	SS towards Shenzhen Airport (Zhongluotan East)
F5; Platforms	Island platform, doors will open on the left or right
F5; Platforms	Platform 4	East Ring towards Huadu (Baiyun Airport East)
F4; Concourse	Lobby	Ticket Office, Waiting Area, Entrances, Exits; Towards 14 Zhuliao
F3		Parking Lot
F2		Parking Lot
G		Parking Lot

=== Entrances/exits ===
The station has 5 points of entry/exit. As this station is connected to the metro station, the entrances/exits of the intercity stations are lettered from D to distinguish from the entrances/exits of the metro station, which are lettered A-C. All exits are accessible via either ramps or elevators.

- D: Guangcong 5th Road
- ~~E~~: (Not open)
- ~~F~~: (Not open)
- G1: Guangcong 5th Road
- G2: Guangcong 5th Road
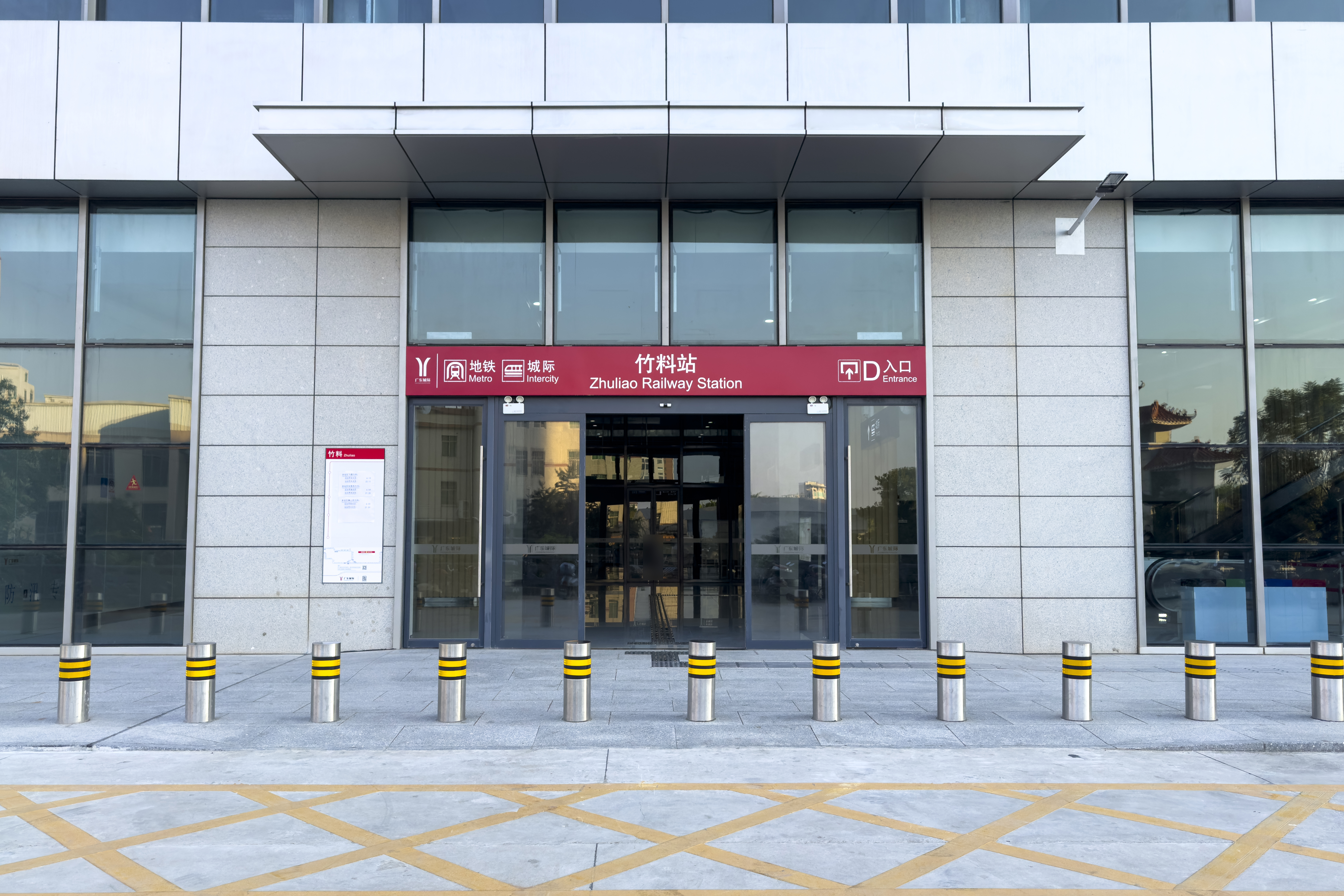
Entrance D

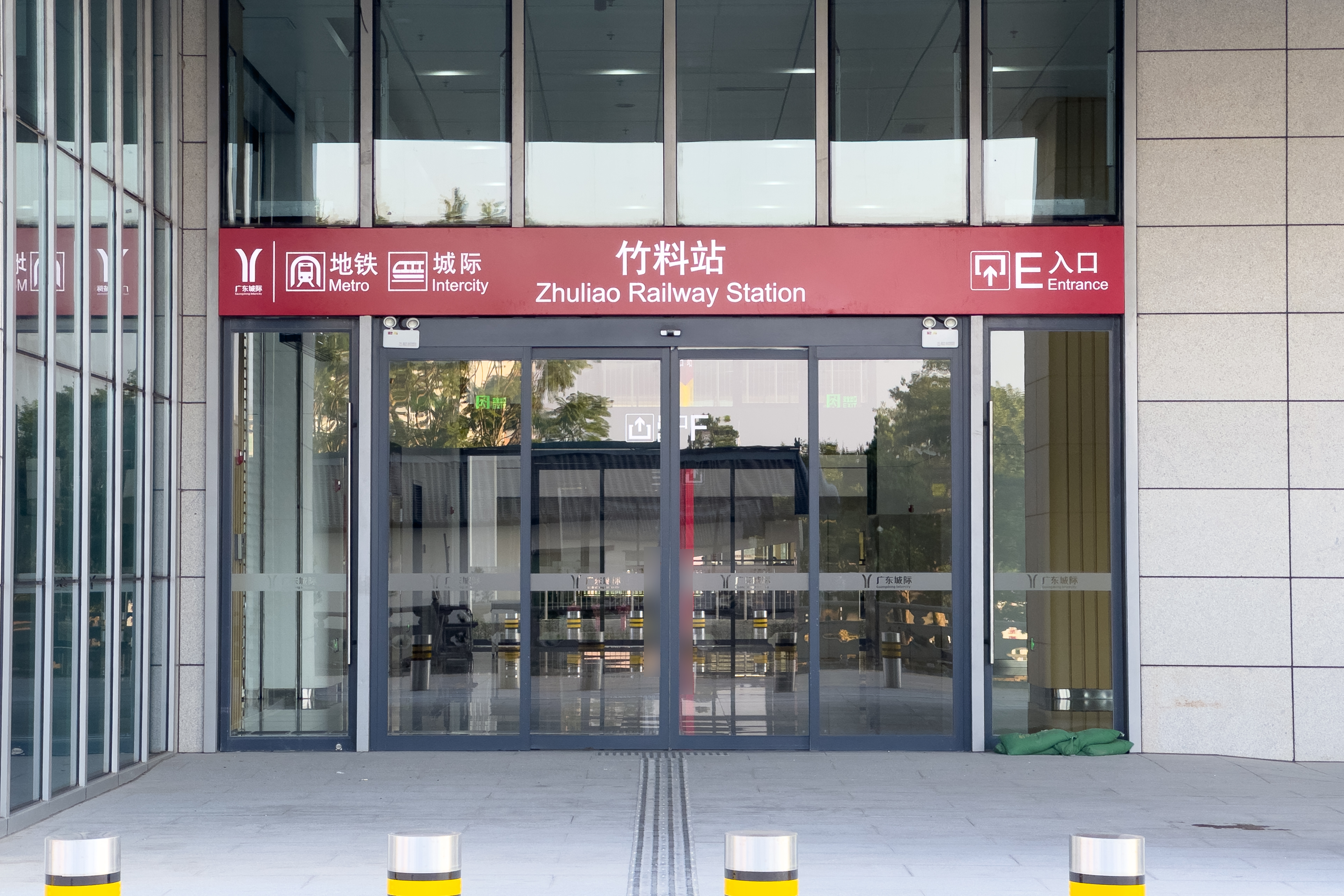
Entrance E

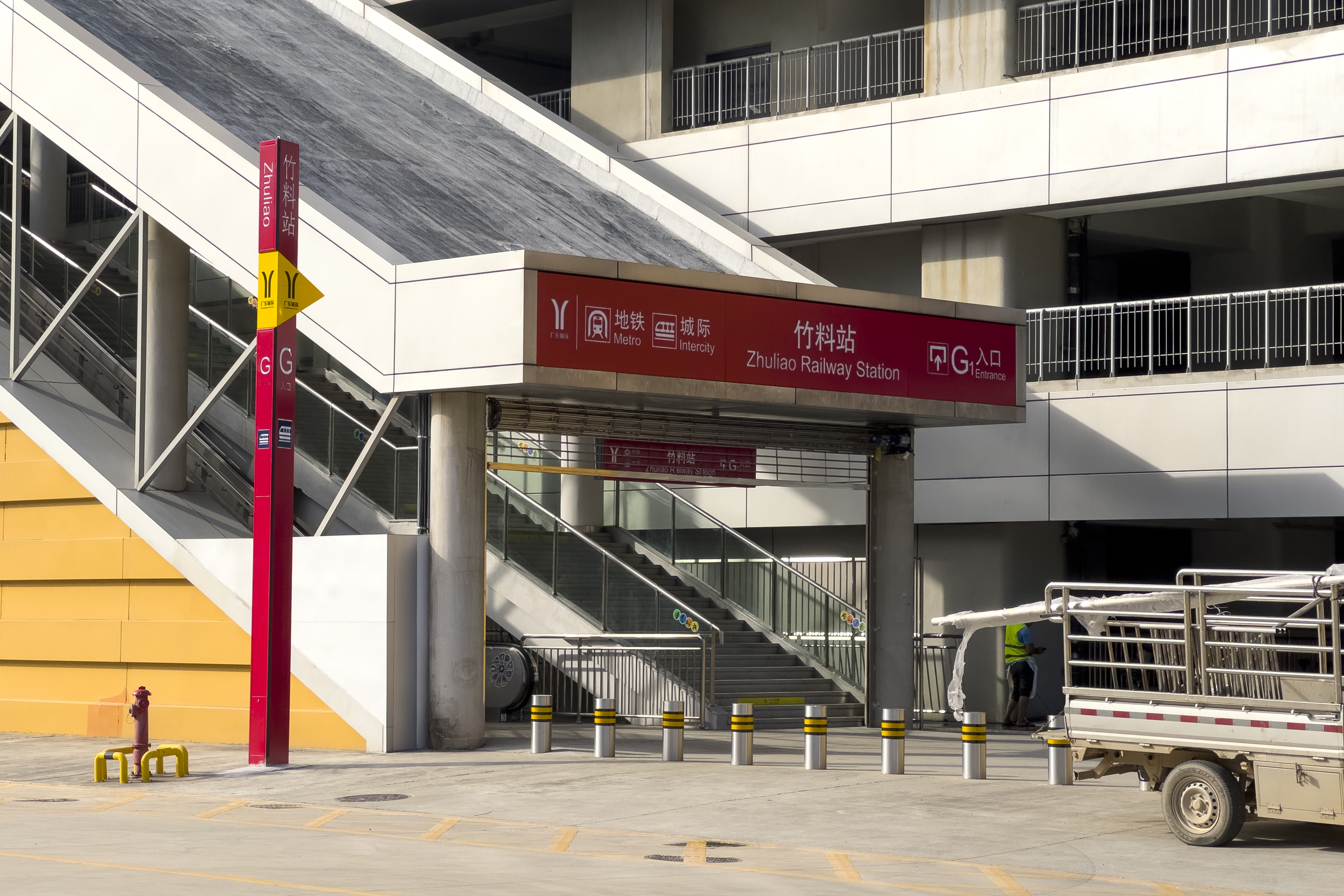
Entrance G1

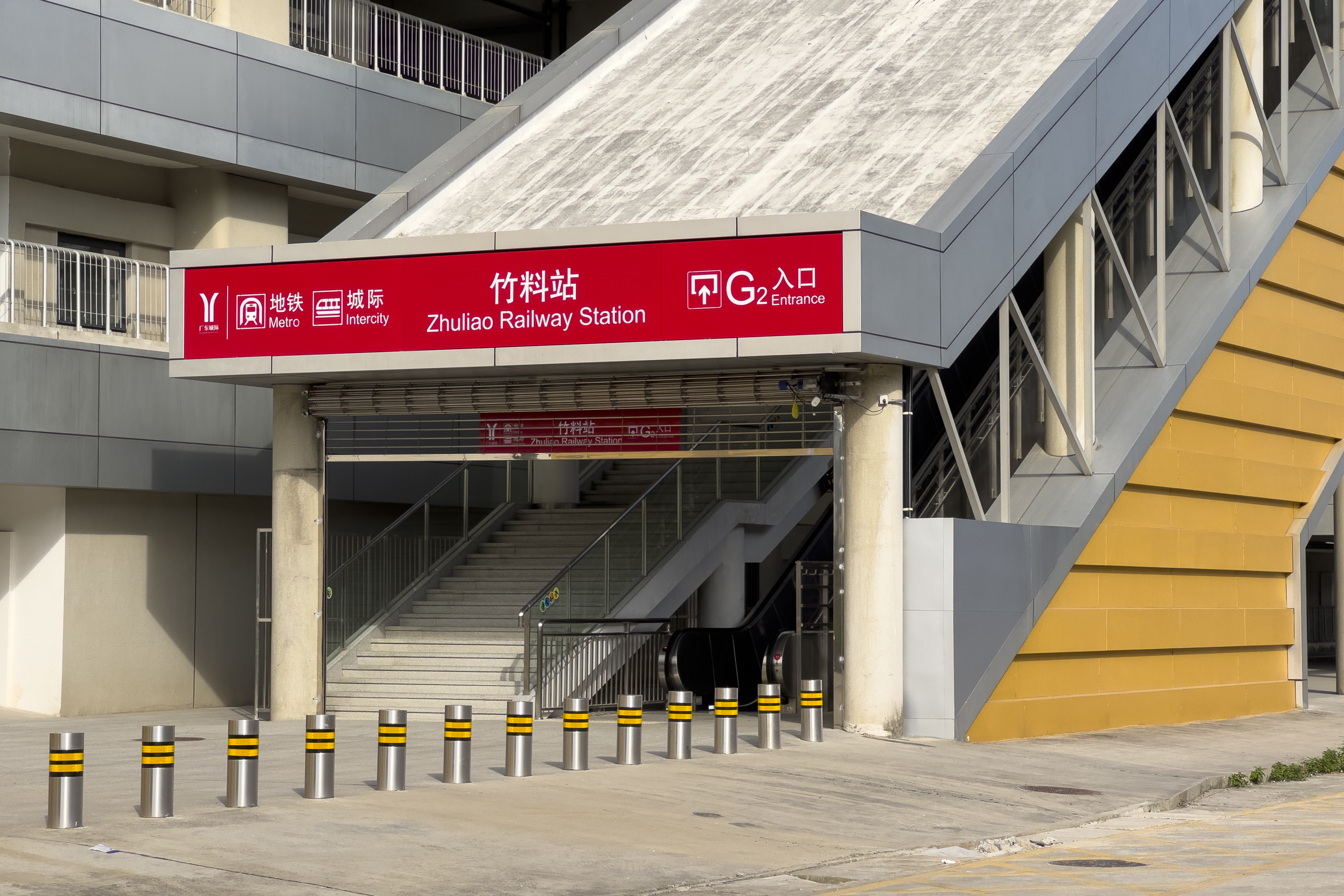
Entrance G2

== Gallery ==
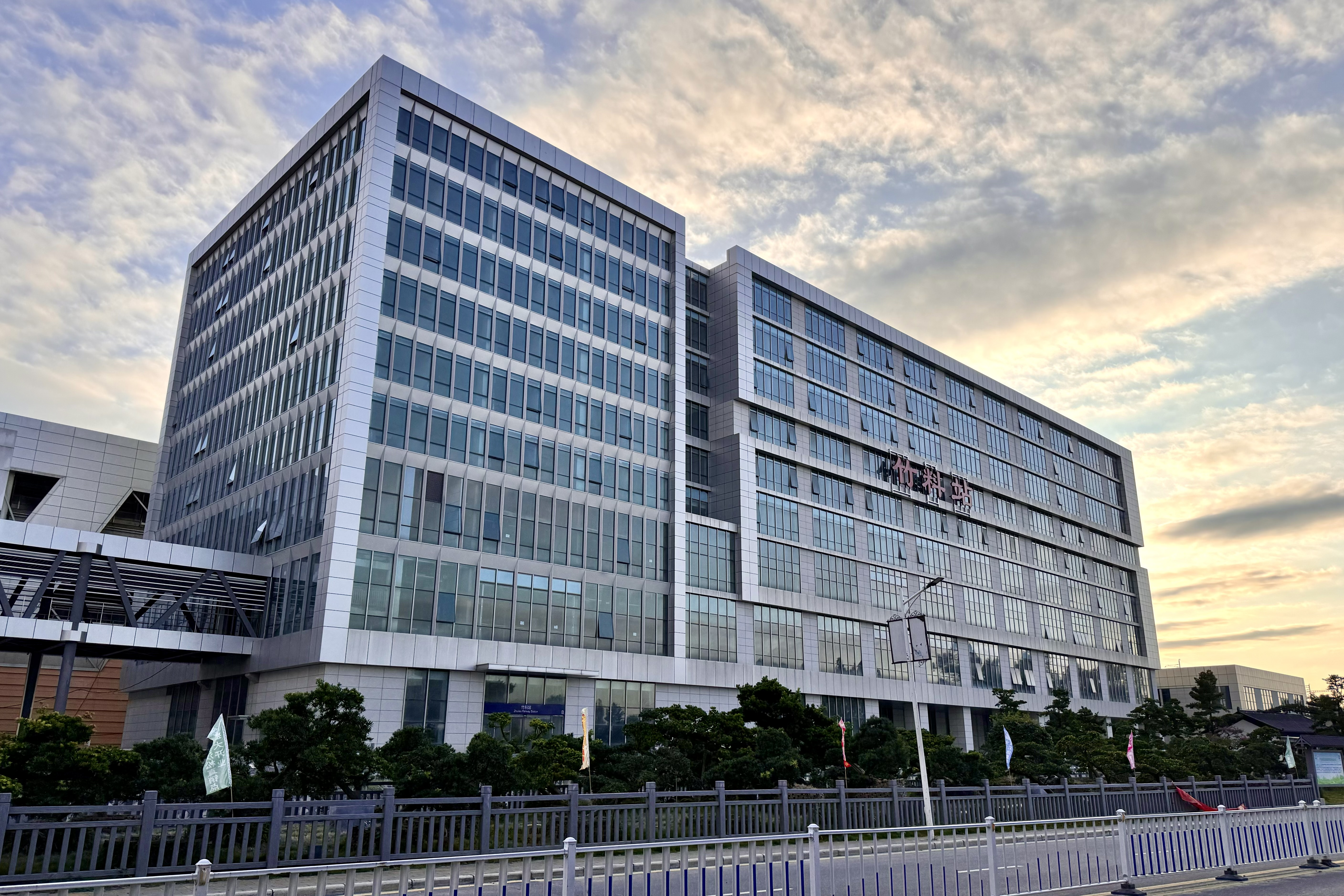
Side building exterior (November 2023)

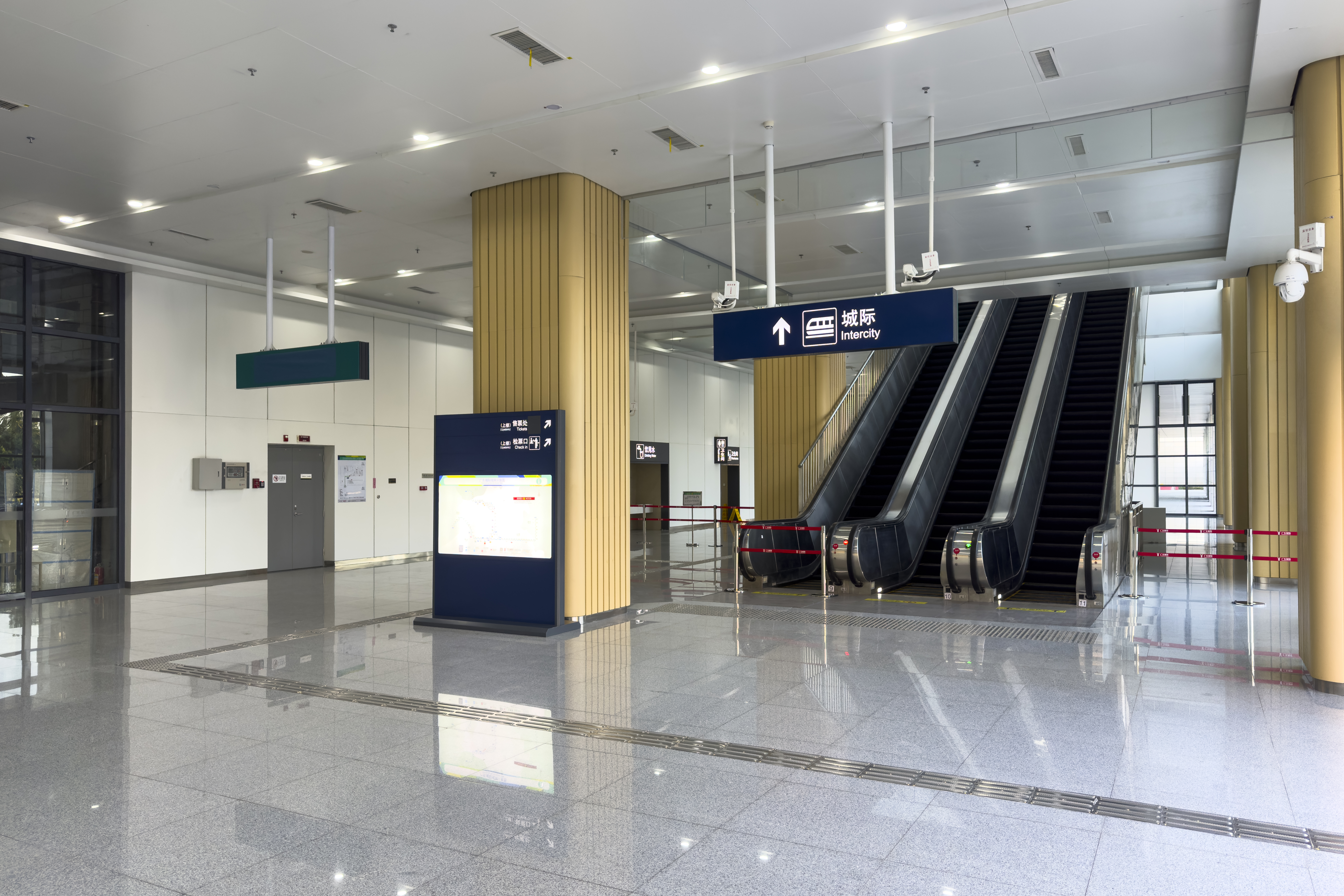
Side building ground floor

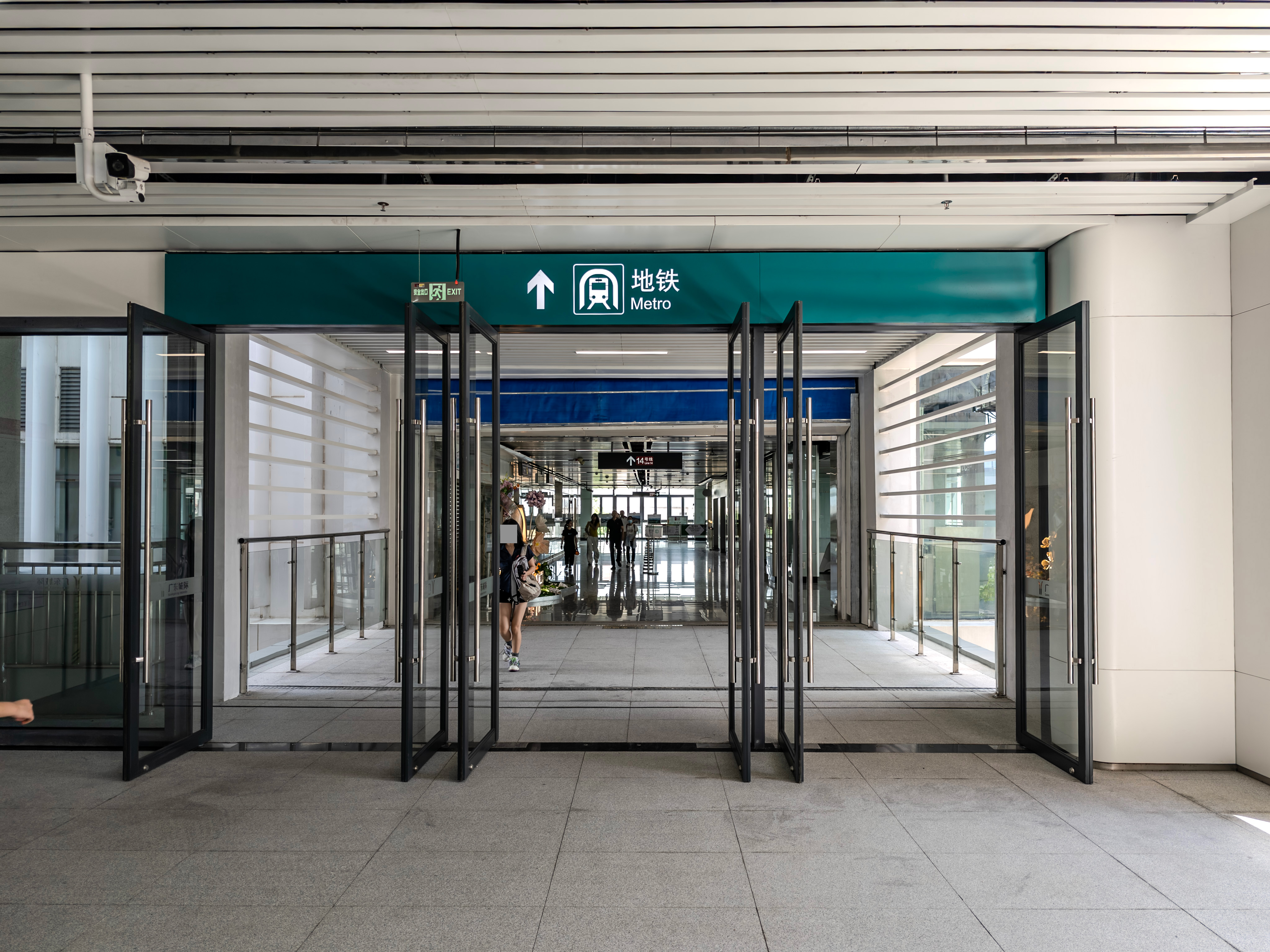
Entrance of transfer passage to metro station

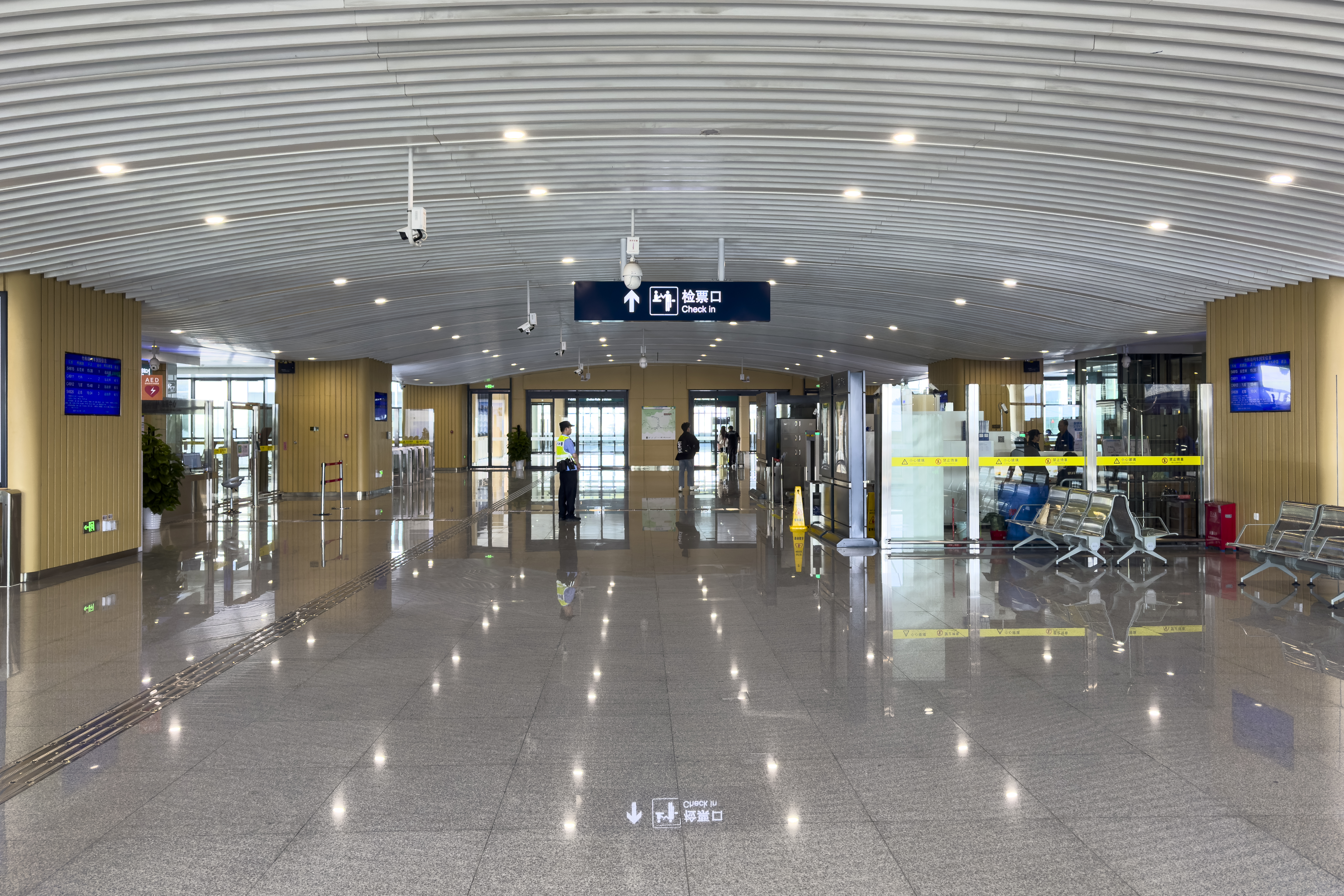
Concourse

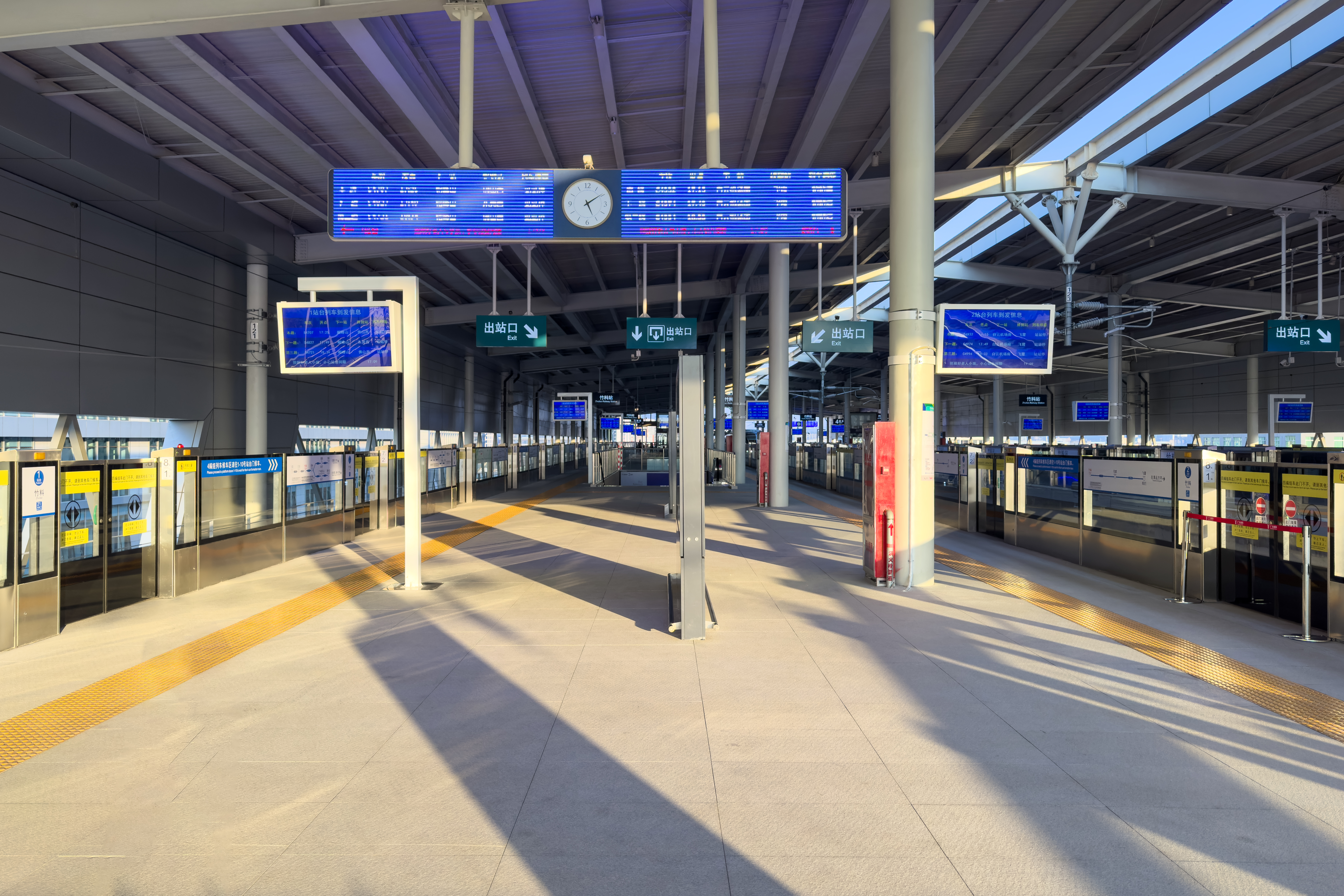
Platforms 1 and 2 (towards Panyu and Huadu respectively)

== History ==
The station structure topped out on 4 April 2019, and the main structure of the side building topped out on 5 December 2020. On 2 February 2021, the station was named Zhuliao station.

On 29 September 2025, the station opened.
