= Yunxiao Road station =

Guangzhou Metro Line 14 station

Yunxiao Road 云霄路
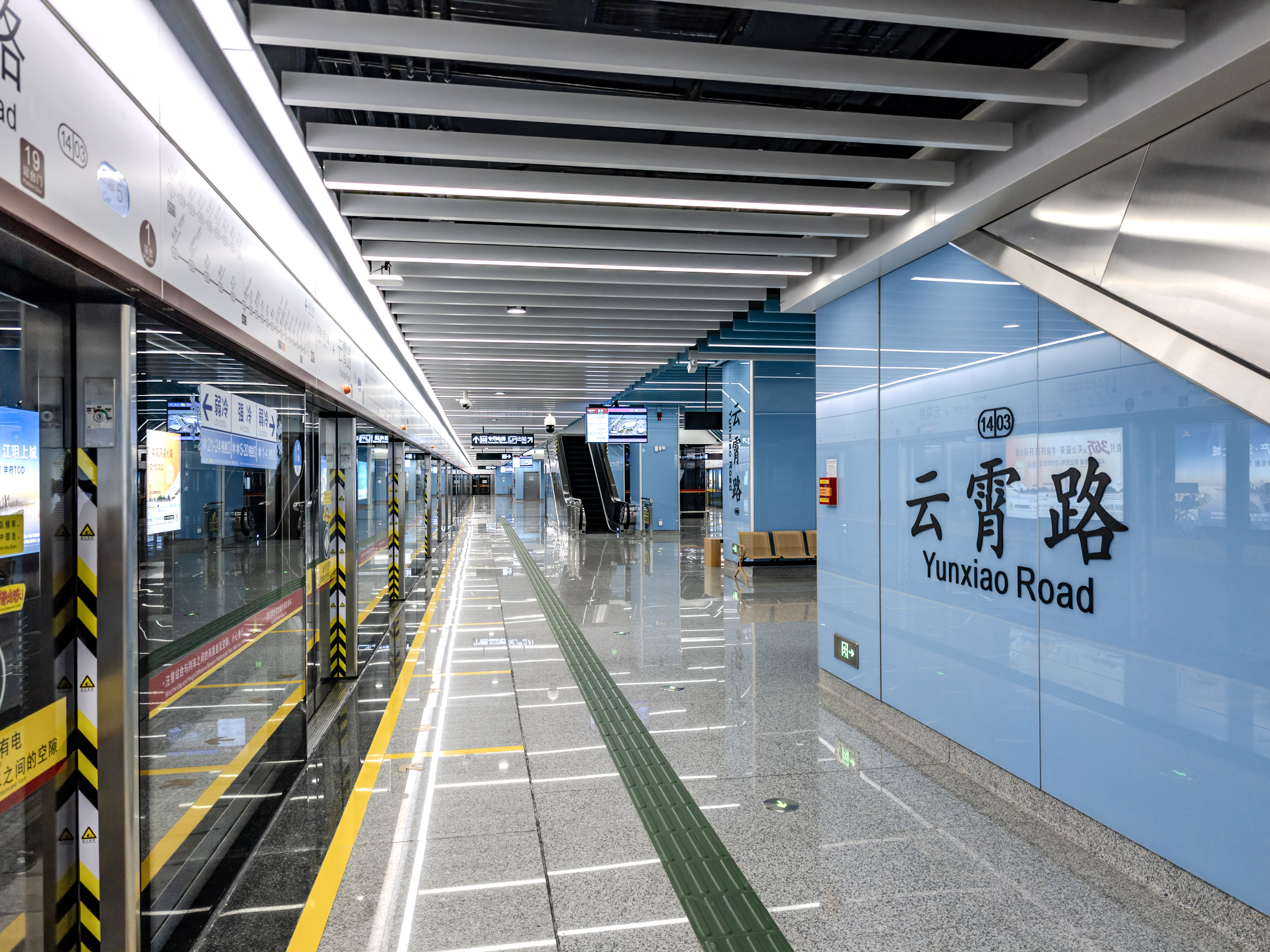
- Platform 1

Chinese name
- Simplified Chinese: 云霄路站
- Traditional Chinese: 雲霄路站
Transcriptions
Standard Mandarin
- Hanyu Pinyin: Yúnxiāo Lù Zhàn
Yue: Cantonese
- Yale Romanization: Wàhnsīu Lǒu Jaahm
- Jyutping: wan4 siu1 lou6 zaam6

General information
- Location: Intersection between Airport Road (机场路) and Xiaogang Avenue (萧岗大马路); Yuncheng Subdistrict, Baiyun District, Guangzhou, Guangdong; China
- Coordinates: 23°11′9.46″N 113°15′18.86″E
- Operator: Guangzhou Metro Co. Ltd.
- Line: Line 14
- Platforms: 2 (1 island platform)
- Tracks: 2

Construction
- Structure type: Underground
- Accessible: No (temporarily)

Other information
- Station code: 1403

History
- Opened: 29 September 2025 (13 months ago)

Services
Preceding station	Guangzhou Metro	Following station
Lejia Road Terminus	Line 14	Xinshixu towards Dongfeng
Location

Yunxiao Road station (simplified Chinese: 云霄路站; traditional Chinese: 雲霄路站; pinyin: Yúnxiāo Lù Zhàn; Cantonese Yale: Wàhnsīu Lǒu Jaahm) is a station on Line 14 of the Guangzhou Metro. It is located at the junction between Airport Road and Xiaogang Avenue in the Yuncheng Subdistrict of Baiyun District in Guangzhou. It opened on 29 September 2025.

== Station Layout ==
=== Station Floorings ===
The station has three underground floors. It is 140.6 metres (461 ft) long, 22.9 metres (75 ft) wide, and about 23.2 metres (76 ft) to 24.3 metres (80 ft) deep. The ground level serves as the station's entrances and exits and is surrounded by Airport Road, Yunxiao Road, Xiaogang Avenue, Airport Expressway viaduct and adjacent buildings. The first underground floor serves as the station concourse, the second underground floor is the station equipment floor, and the third underground floor houses the platform.

=== Concourse ===
The station concourse is equipped with ticket vending machines and an intelligent customer service center.

To facilitate pedestrian access, the west side of the concourse is designated as a paid area. Within this area, dedicated elevators, escalators, and stairs provide easy access to the platforms.

=== Platforms ===
The station has an island platform located underground on the east side of Airport Road. Toilets and a nursing room are located at the northern end in the direction of Xinshixu.

=== Entrances/exits ===
The station has 2 points of entry/exit. As Exit C on the west side of Airport Road is under construction, and the two existing entrances/exits do not feature elevators, there is currently no elevator access to the station.

- A: Airport Road, Yunxiao Road, Second People's Hospital of Guangdong Province Civil Aviation Campus
- B: Airport Road, Xiaogang Avenue, Guangzhou Baiyun District Federation of Trade Unions, The Third Affiliated Hospital of Guangzhou Medical University Baiyun Branch
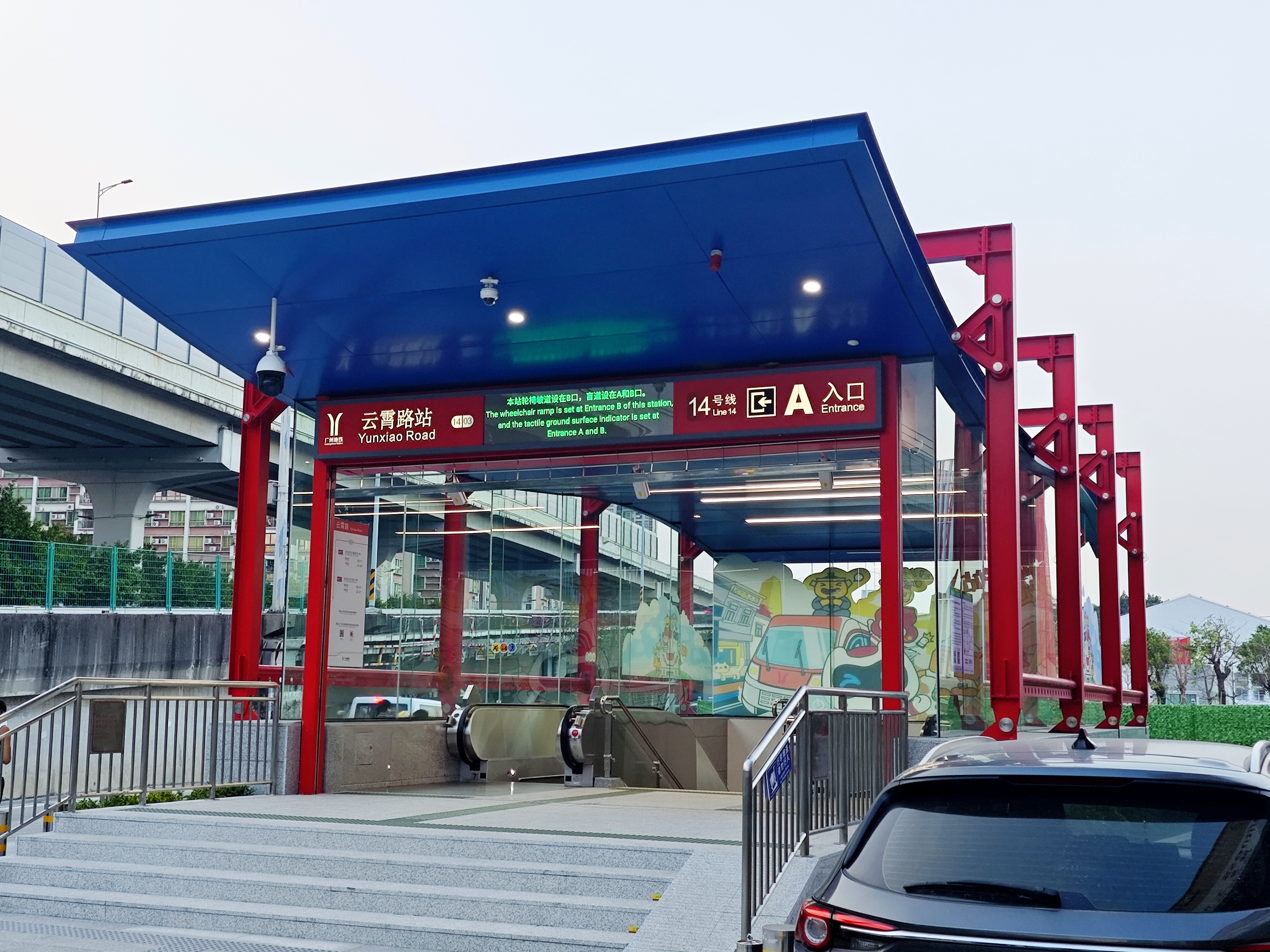
Entrance A

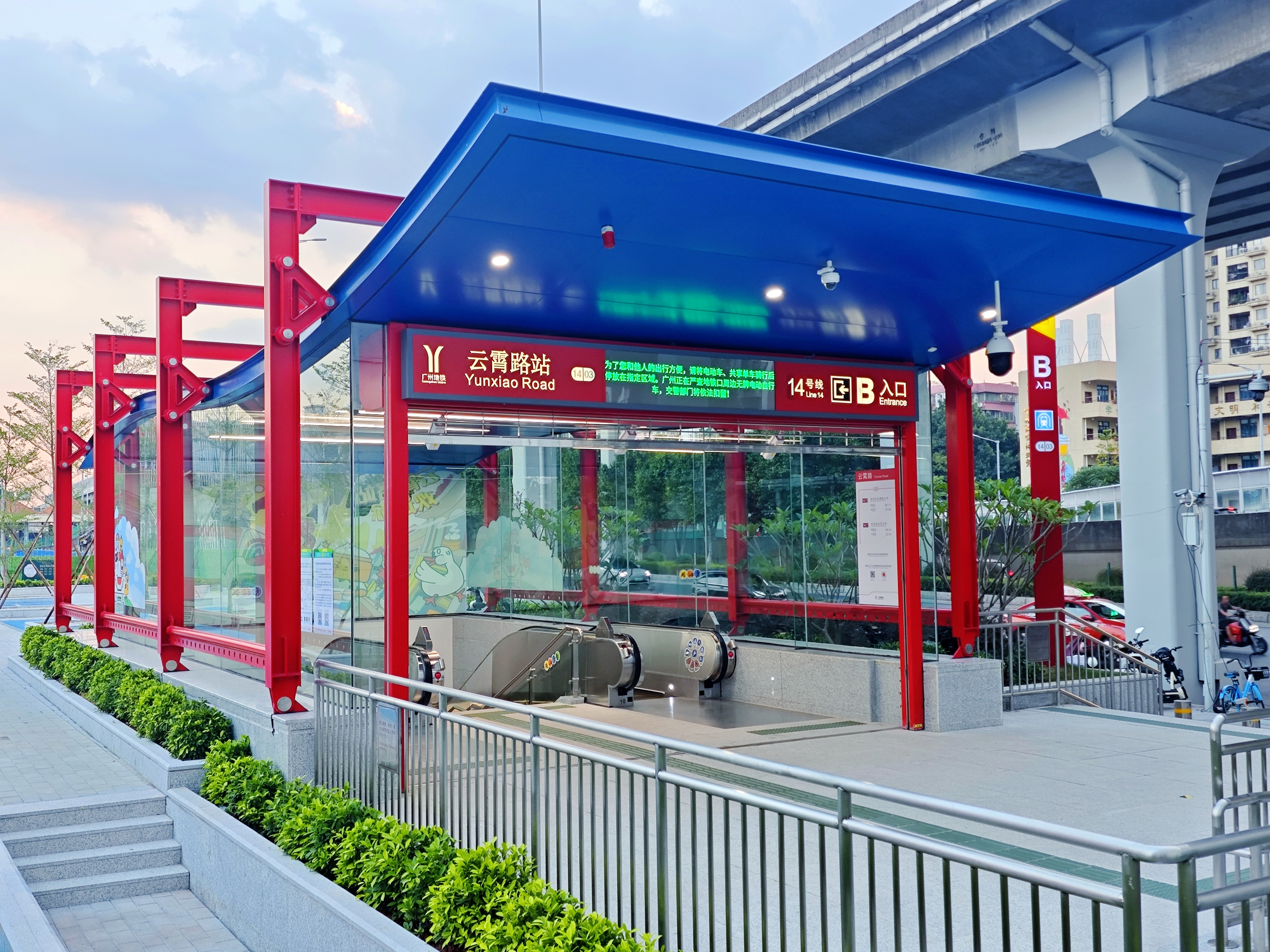
Entrance B

== Gallery ==
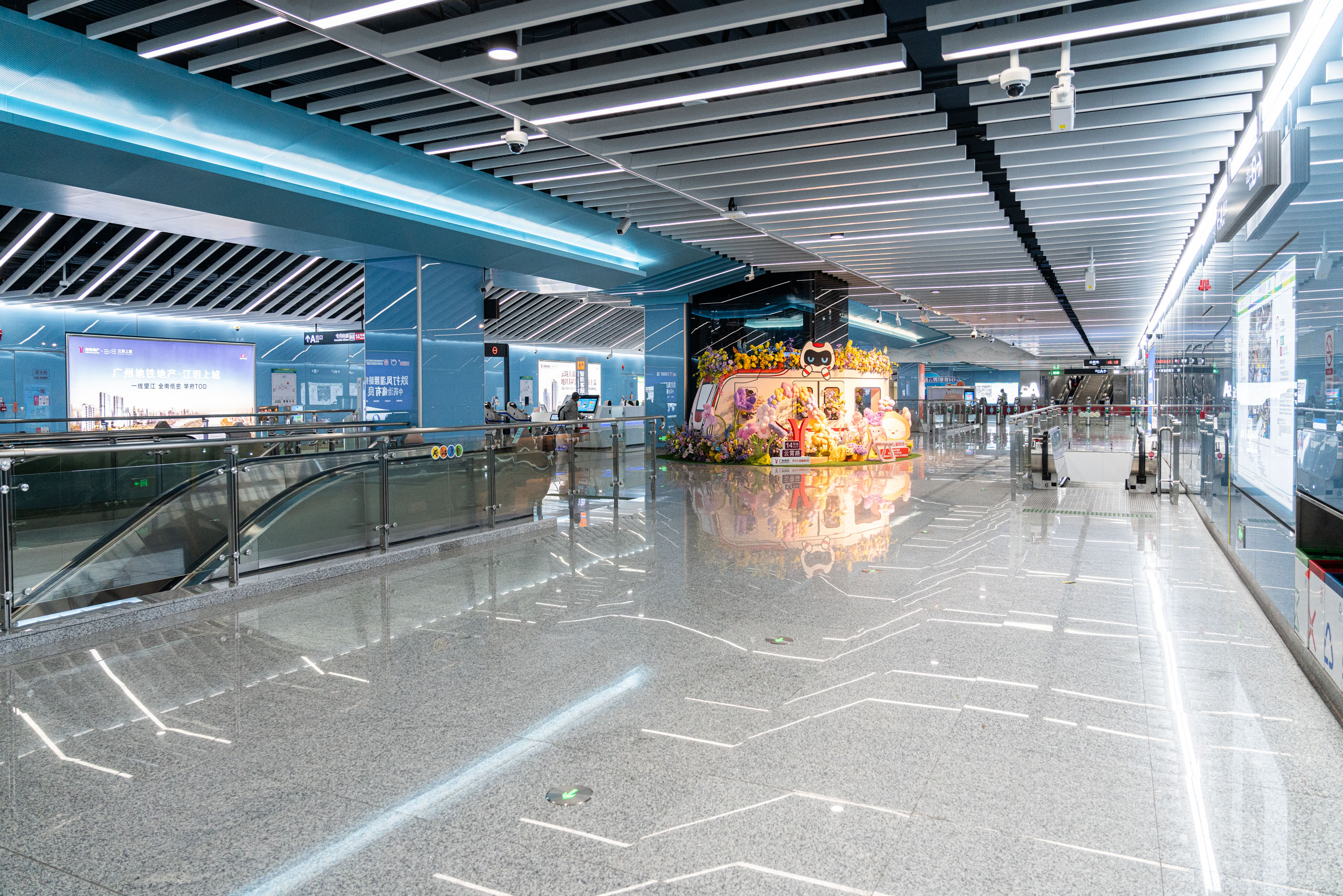
Concourse

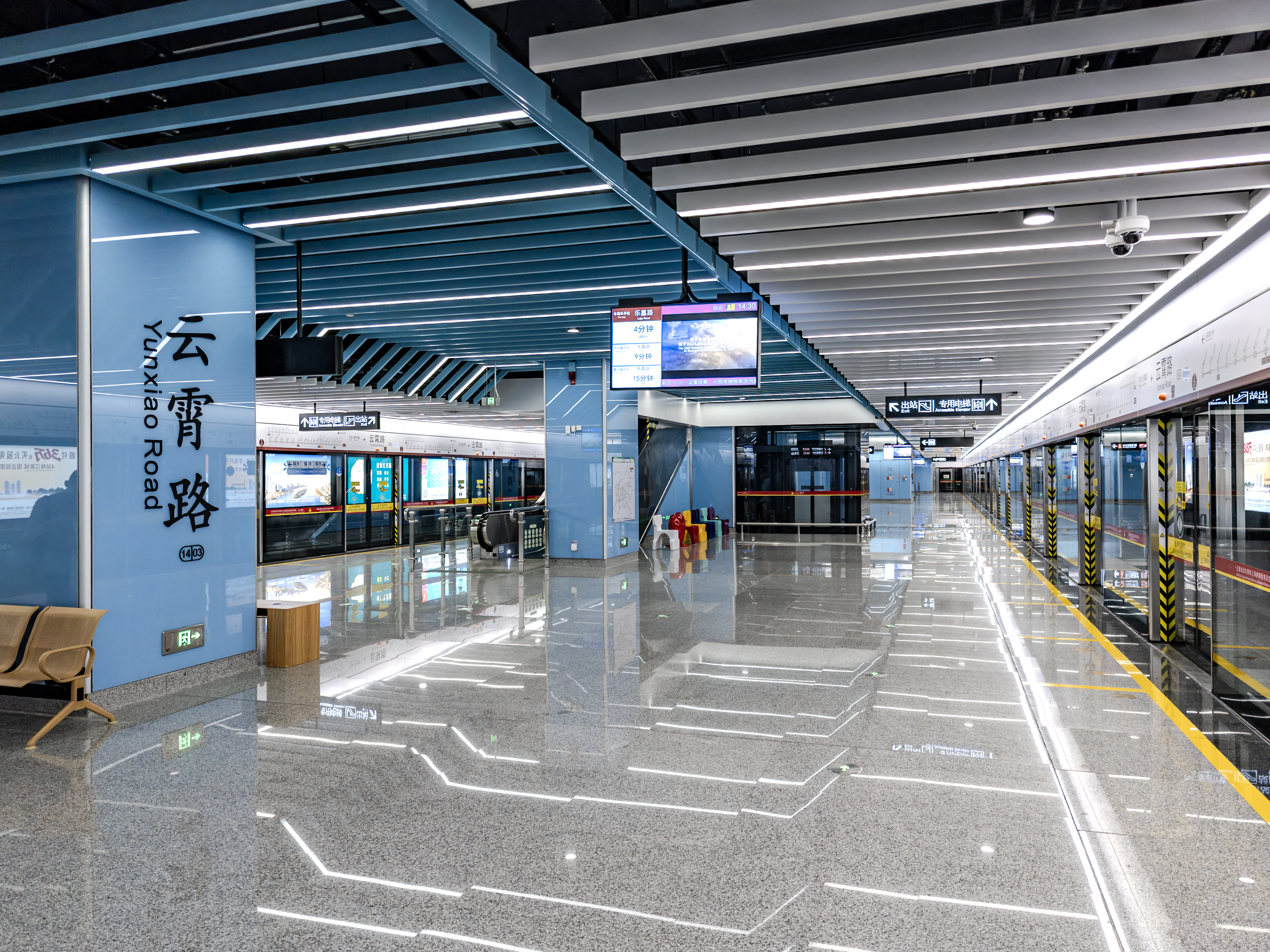
Platform 2

== History ==
The original plan for the second phase of Line 14 was to set up the station at the junction of Airport Road and Gangbei Road, and plan to have the station as an interchange with Line 12. Later, several stations were added to the line, with this station moved north to its current location. At the same time, in order for Line 12 to meet the planning requirements of connecting to the national railway Tangxi station (now Guangzhou Baiyun railway station), the western section of Line 12 was slightly modified to detour north and no longer pass through this station. Finally, the second phase of Line 14 was approved, and construction of this station was carried out. During this period, this station was named Gangbei station. In July 2025, the Guangzhou Municipal Transportation Bureau announced the preliminary station names for the second phase of Line 14. This station was proposed to be named Yunxiao Road station and was officially named in September 2025.

On 30 June 2019, the station started enclosure construction, making it the first station to start construction in the second phase of Line 14. In June 2022, the main structure topped out.

On 29 September 2025, the station opened for operation.

== Accident ==
On 3 August 2025, an object strike accident occurred at this station site, resulting in 1 death.
