= Xinshixu station =

Guangzhou Metro Line 12 and Line 14 station

Xinshixu 新市墟
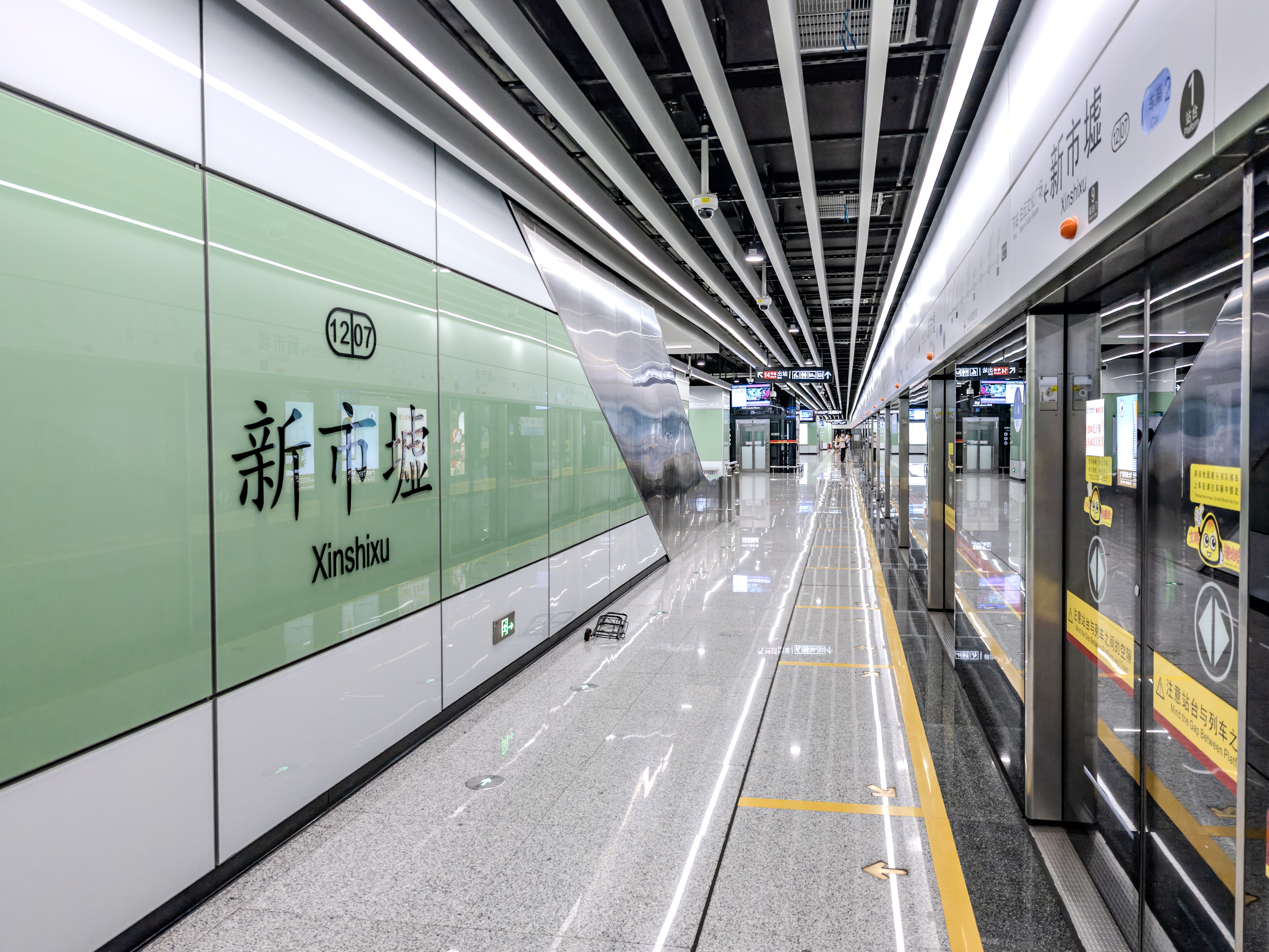
- Line 12 Platform 2 (towards Xunfenggang)

Chinese name
- Chinese: 新市墟站
Transcriptions
Standard Mandarin
- Hanyu Pinyin: Xīnshìxū Zhàn
Yue: Cantonese
- Yale Romanization: Sānsíhhēui Jaahm
- Jyutping: San^{1} si^{5} heoi^{1} Zaam^{6}

General information
- Location: Southeast side of the intersection of Airport Road (机场路) and Qifu Road (齐富路); Yuncheng Subdistrict, Baiyun District, Guangzhou, Guangdong; China
- Coordinates: 23°11′49.16″N 113°15′29.77″E
- Operator: Guangzhou Metro Co. Ltd.
- Lines: Line 12; Line 14
- Platforms: 4 (2 island platforms)
- Tracks: 4

Construction
- Structure type: Underground
- Accessible: Yes

Other information
- Station code: 1207 1404

History
- Opened: Line 12: 29 June 2025 (15 months ago); Line 14: 29 September 2025 (12 months ago)

Services
Preceding station	Guangzhou Metro	Following station
Tangchong towards Xunfenggang	Line 12 West section	Baiyun Culture Square towards Guangzhou Gymnasium
Yunxiao Road towards Lejia Road	Line 14	Mawu towards Dongfeng
Location

Xinshixu station (Chinese: 新市墟站; pinyin: Xīnshìxū Zhàn; Cantonese Yale: Sānsíhhēui Jaahm) is an interchange station between Line 12 and Line 14 of the Guangzhou Metro. It is located on the southeast side of the intersection of Airport Road and Qifu Road in the Baiyun District of Guangzhou. The station opened on 29 June 2025, and Line 14 platforms opened on 29 September 2025.

== Station layout ==
The station has four floors. The ground level is the exit, and is surrounded by Airport Road and the Airport Expressway Viaduct, Qifu Road, Huiqiao South Road, Baixin Plaza and surrounding buildings. The first floor is reserved for the Baiyun Second Line Tunnel Project, the second floor is the concourse, the third floor is the Line 12 platform and part of the Line 14 equipment area, and the fourth floor is the Line 14 platform.

G	-	Exits A, B, C, H
L1	-	(Reserved for Baiyun Second Line Tunnel Project)
L2; Concourse	Lobby	Ticket Machines, Customer Service, Shops, Police Station, Security Facilities
L3; 12 Platforms	Platform 2	12 towards Xunfenggang (Tangchong)
L3; 12 Platforms	Island platform, doors will open on the left (Toilets, Nursery)
L3; 12 Platforms	Platform 1	12 towards Guangzhou Gymnasium (Baiyun Culture Square)
L3; 12 Platforms	Line 14 Equipment Area	Station Equipment
	Transfer level	Towards Lines 12 and 14 platforms
L4; 14 Platforms	Platform 4	14 towards Lejia Road (Yunxiao Road)
L4; 14 Platforms	Island platform, doors will open on the left (Toilets, Nursery)
L4; 14 Platforms	Platform 3	14 towards Dongfeng (Mawu)

=== Concourse ===
There are automatic ticket machines and an AI customer service center in the concourse. The paid area is equipped with elevators, escalators, and stairs to allow passengers to transfer between lines. There are 8 escalators connecting the concourse and the Line 14 platform.

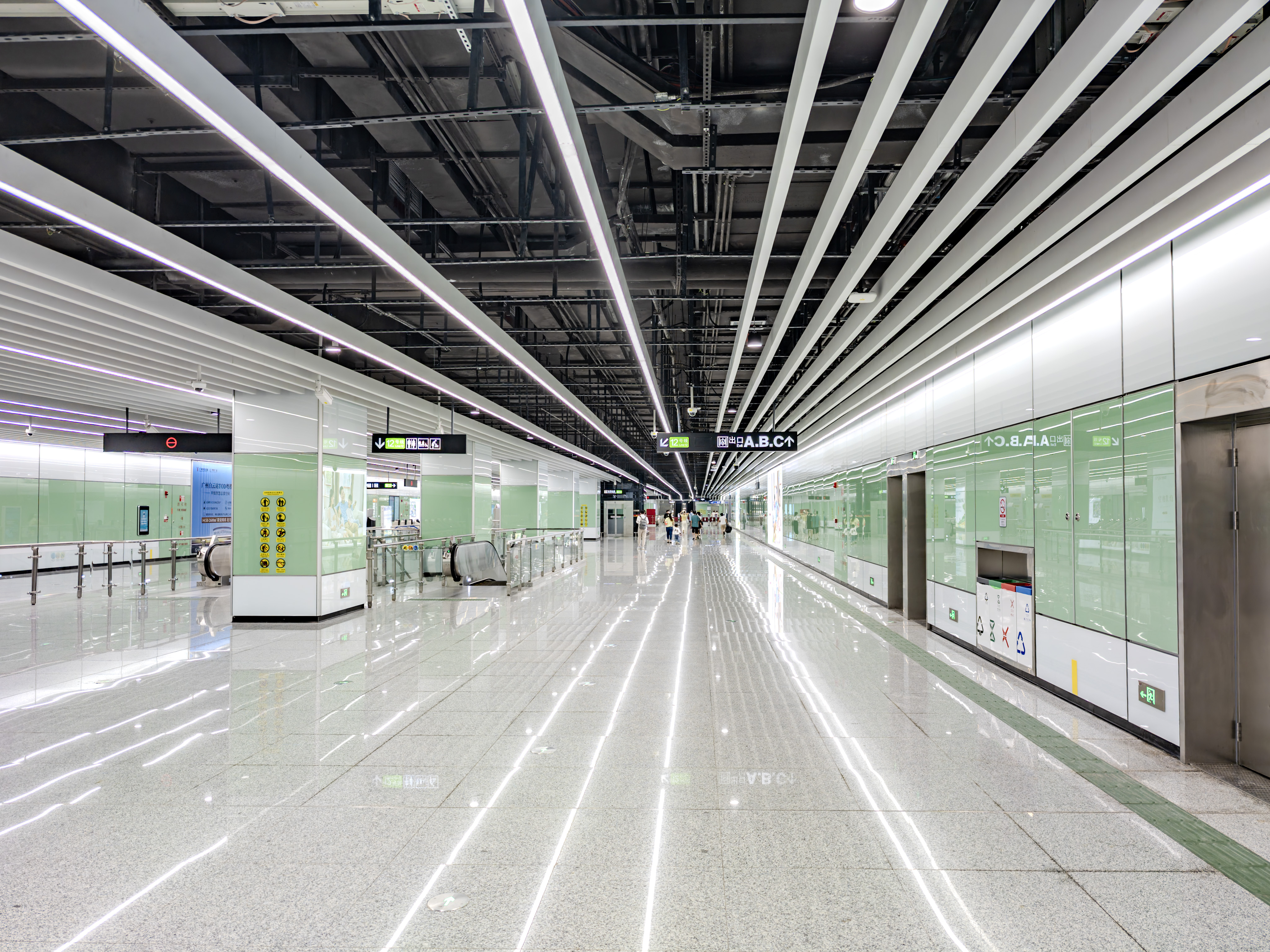
Line 12 concourse

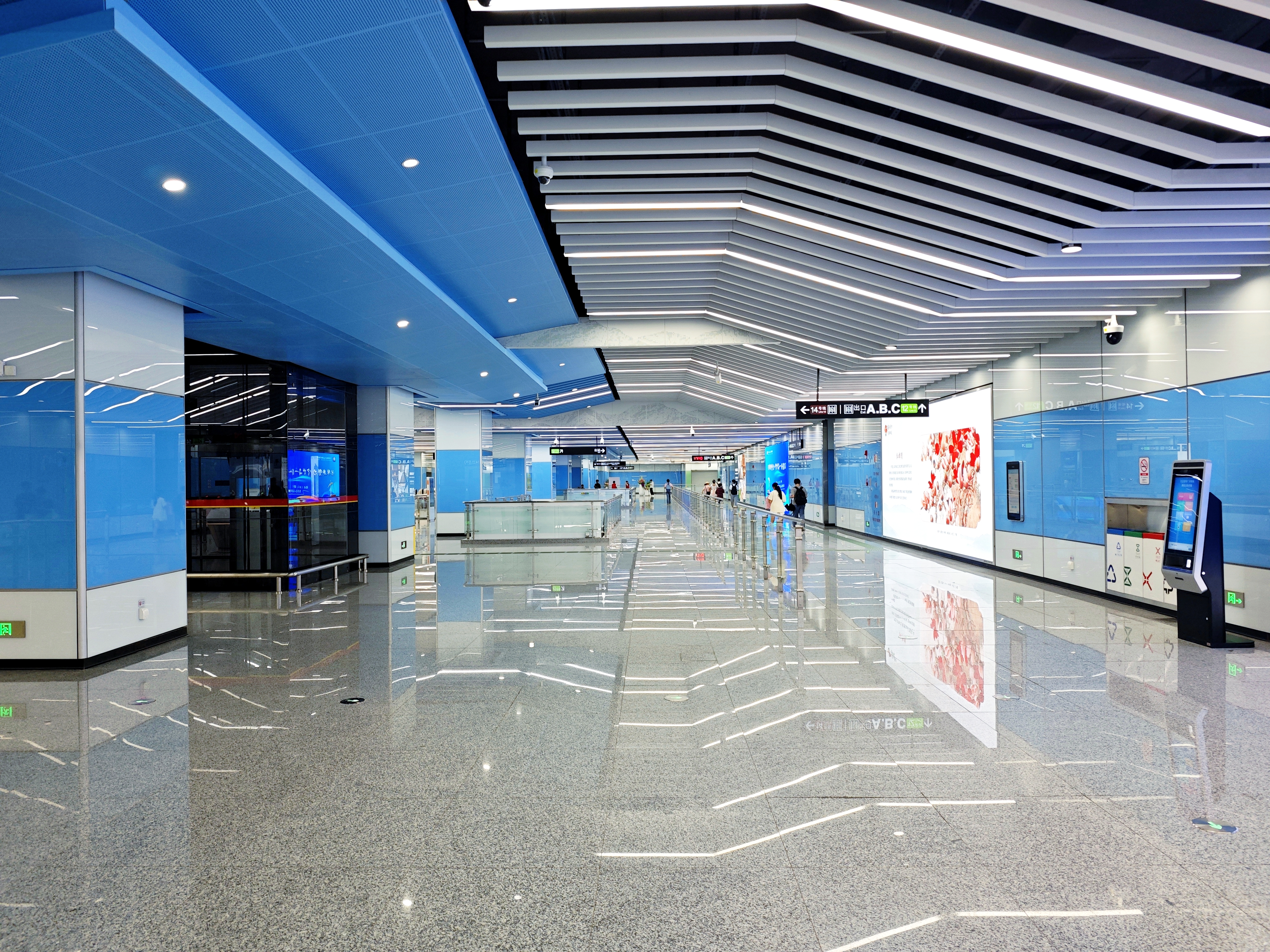
Line 14 concourse

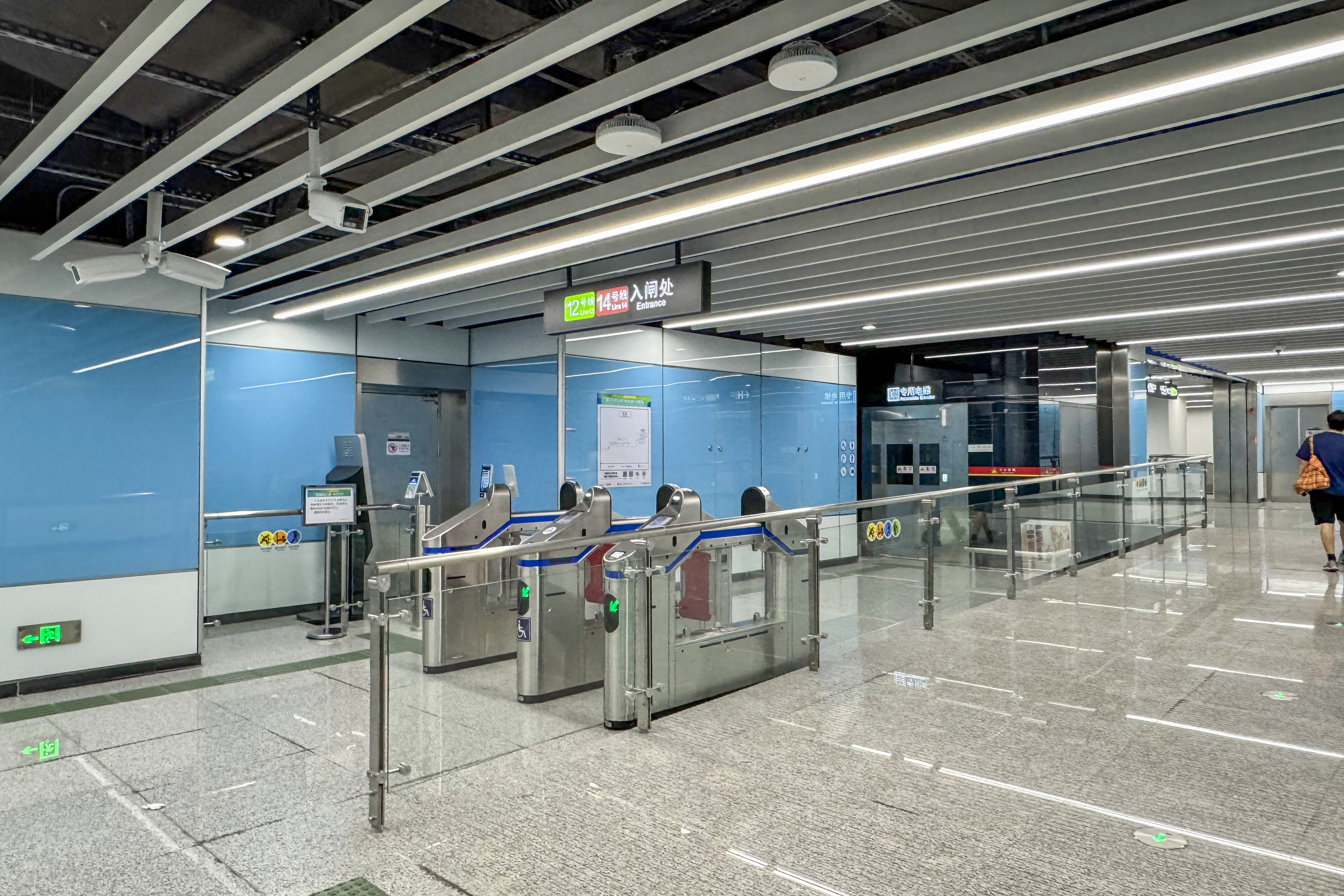
Entrance and exit gate at the elevator on the Line 14 equipment level

=== Platforms ===
The station has an island platform each for Line 12 and Line 14 respectively. The Line 12 platform is located under Qifu Road, and the Line 14 platform is located under the east side of Airport Road, with Line 12 on the upper level and Line 14 on the lower level. Both platforms have toilets and a nursery room, of which the Line 12 ones are at the western end towards Xunfenggang, and the Line 14 ones are at the southern end.

The two platforms are connected at the west end of the Line 12 platform and the north end of the Line 14 platform through the mezzanine transfer lobby, allowing passengers to transfer between the two lines. In addition, passengers can also transfer via the concourse.

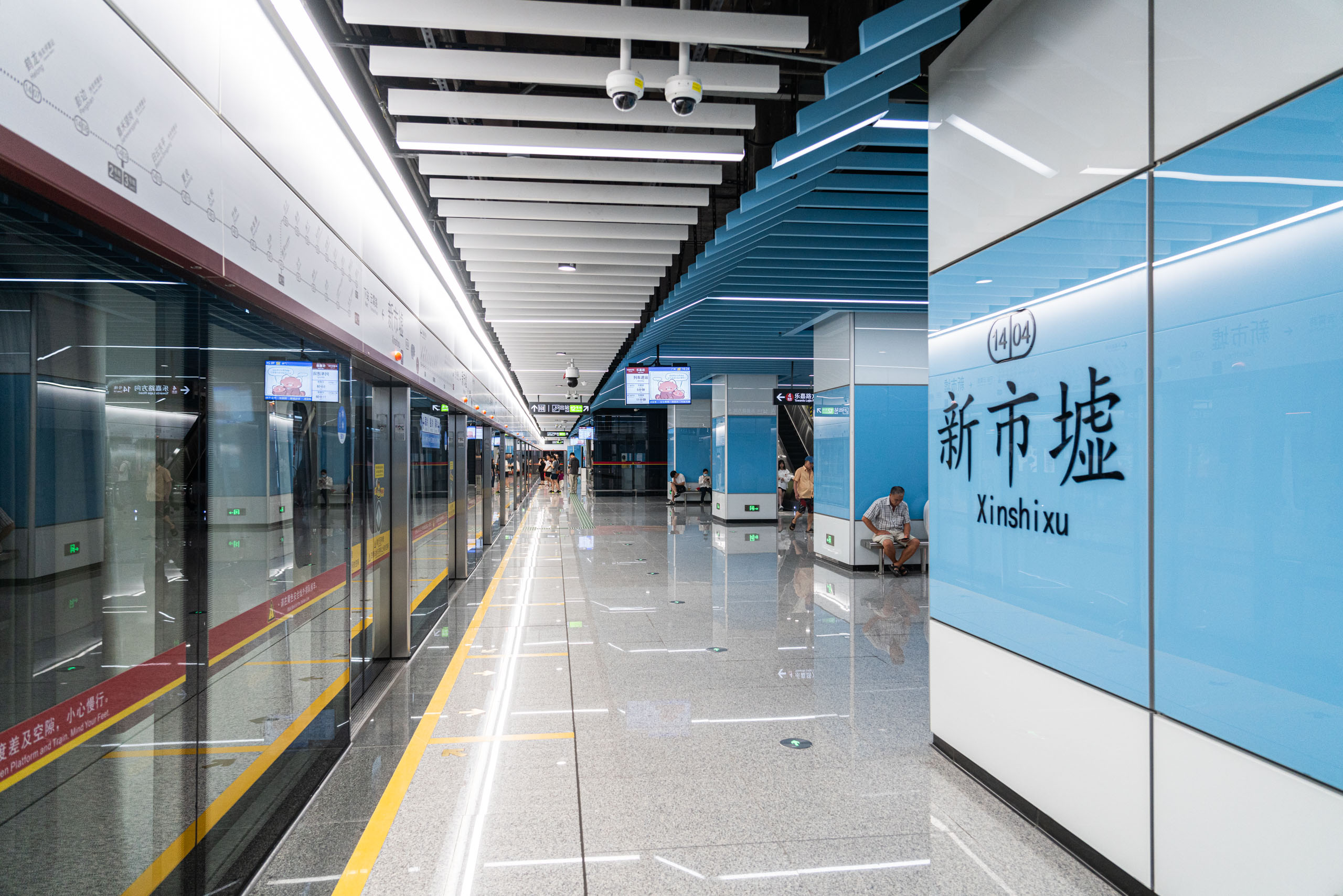
Line 14 Platform 4 (towards Lejia Road)

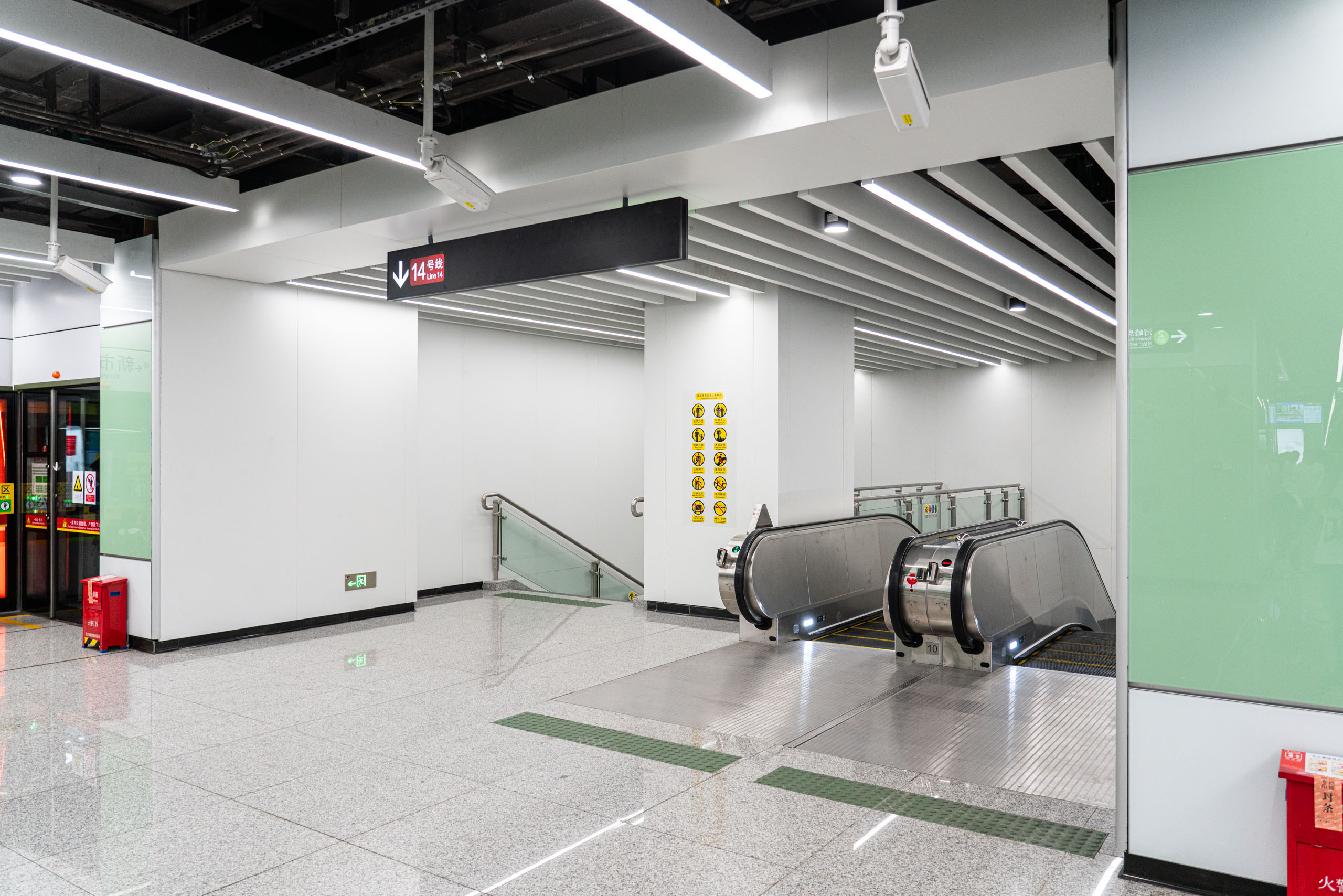
Transfer node from Line 12 to Line 14

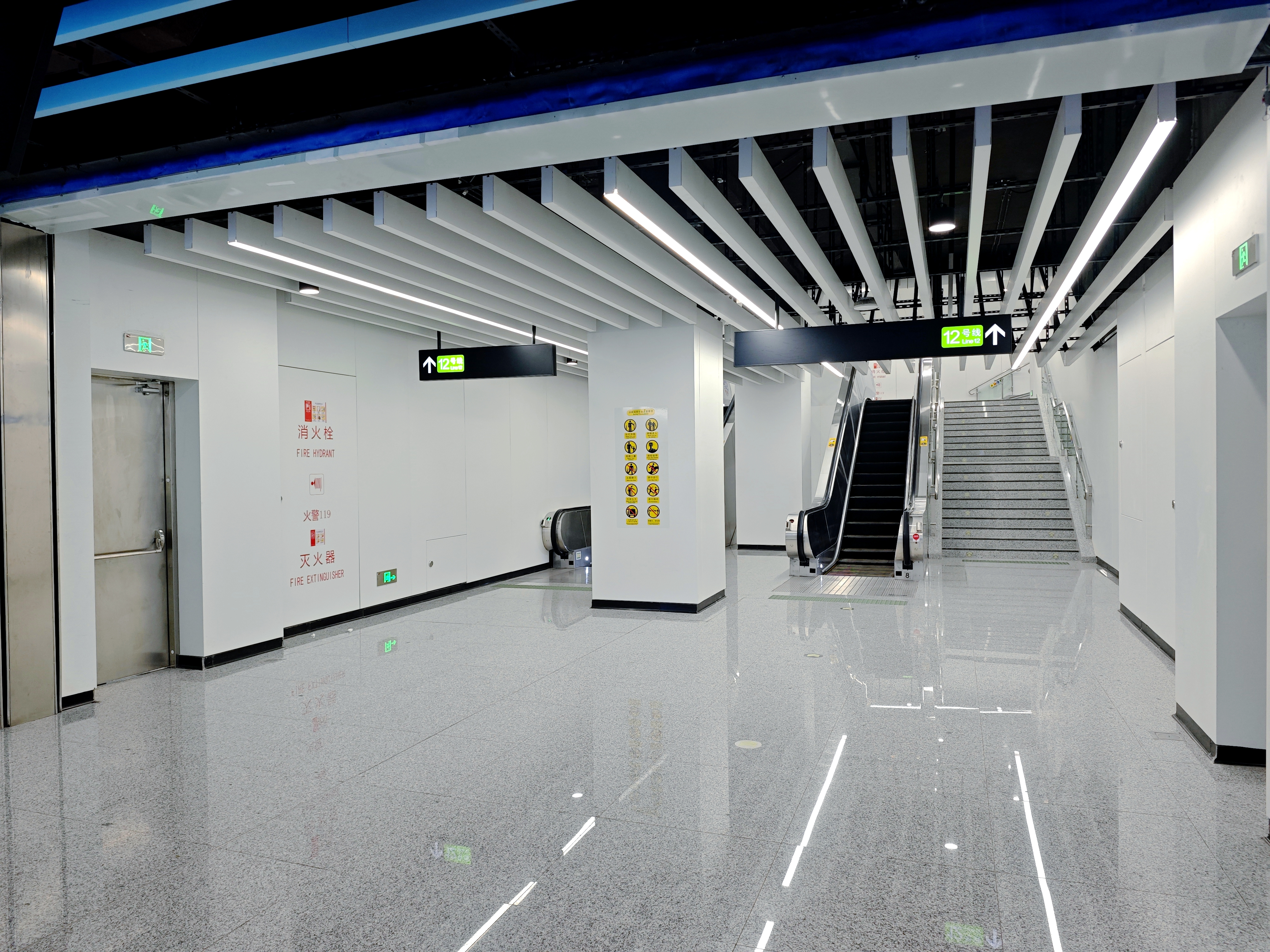
Transfer node from Line 14 to Line 12

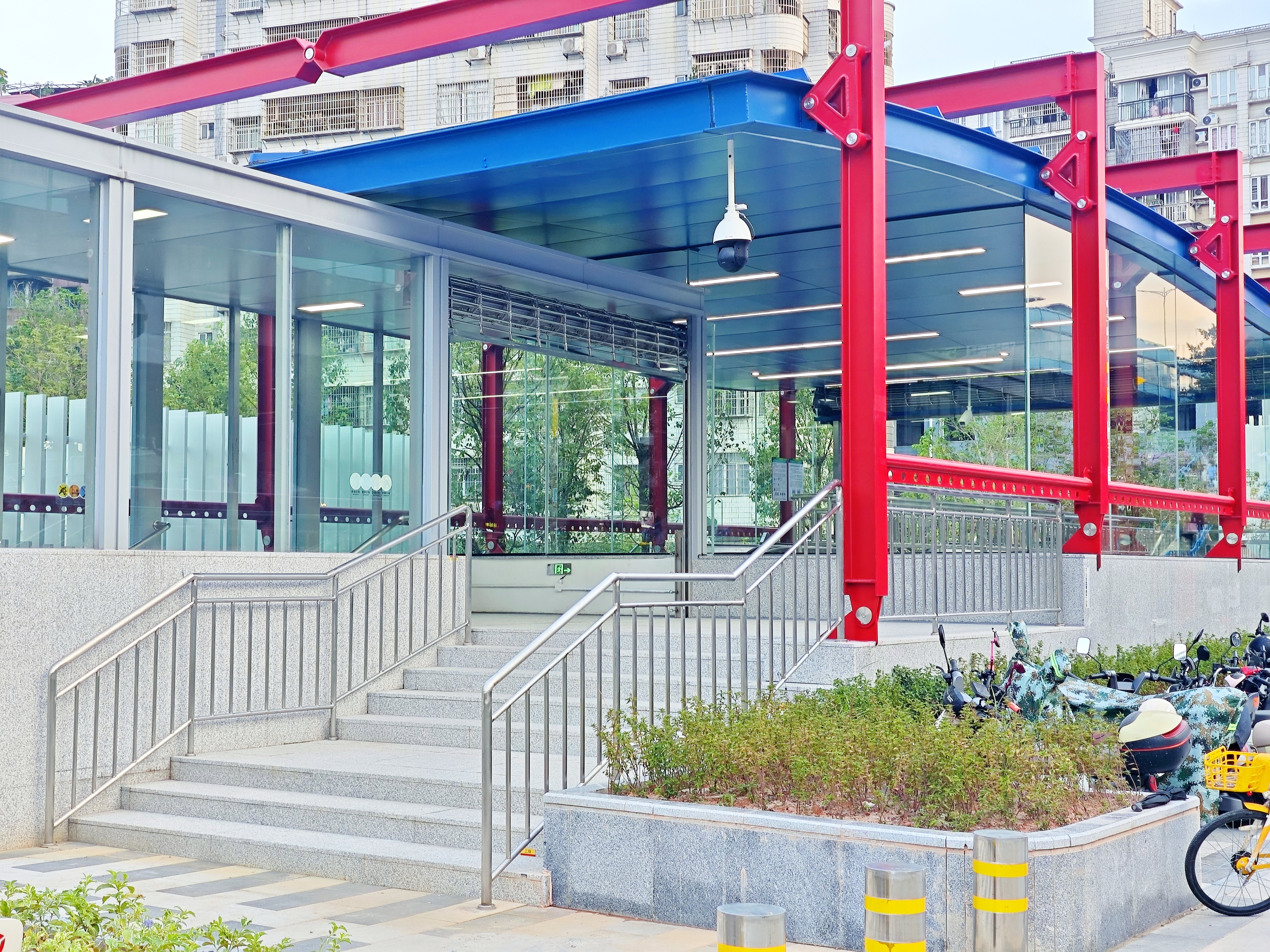
The emergency exit passage next to Exit H, currently opened

=== Entrances/exits ===
The station has 5 points of entry/exit. Exits A and F are equipped with elevators. Exit F opened on 21 September 2026.

==== Line 12 concourse ====
- A: Qifu Road, Airport Road
- B: Qifu Road, Yixin Road
- C: Qifu Road

==== Line 14 concourse ====
- F: Airport Road
- H: Airport Road
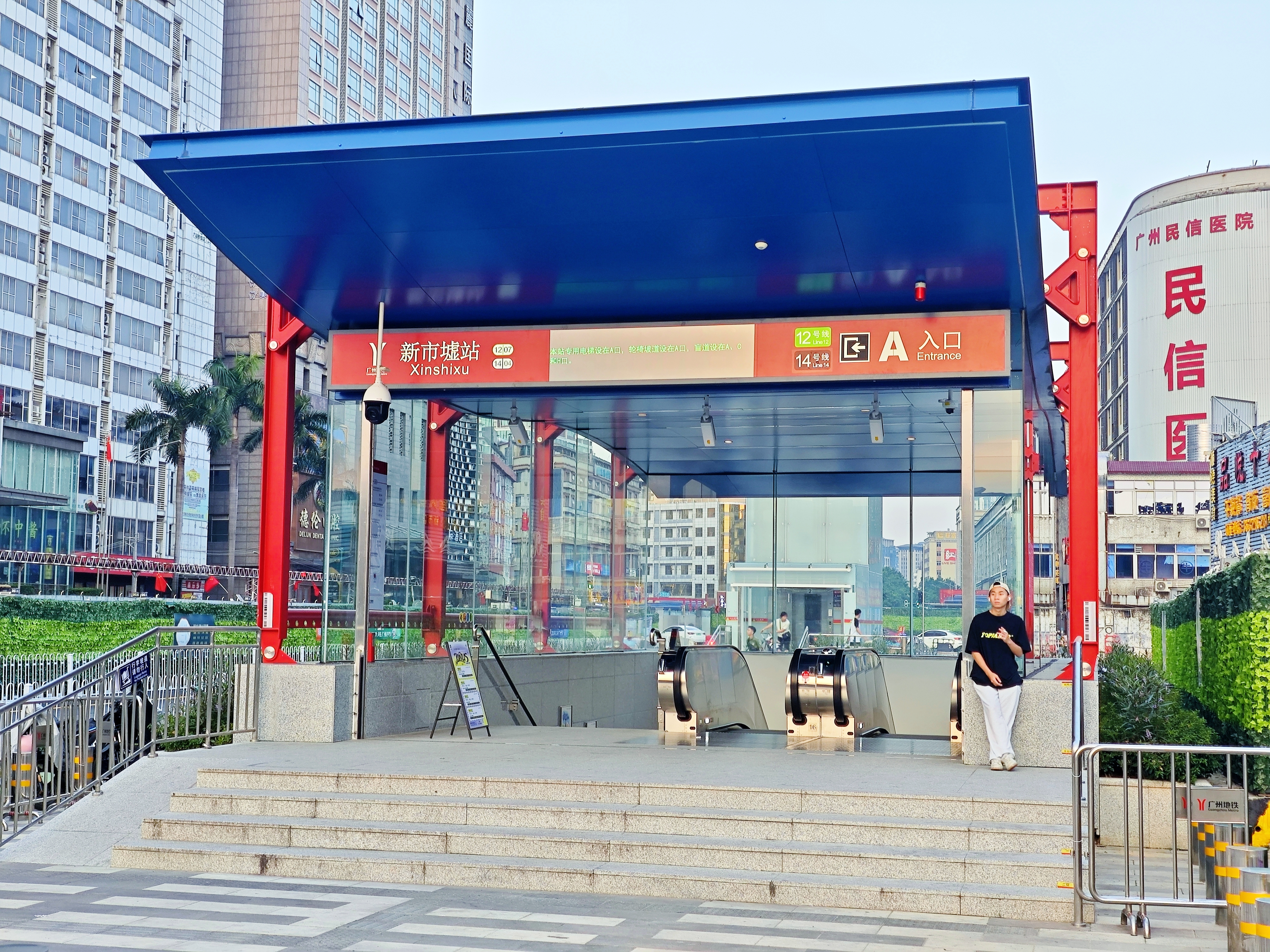
Entrance A

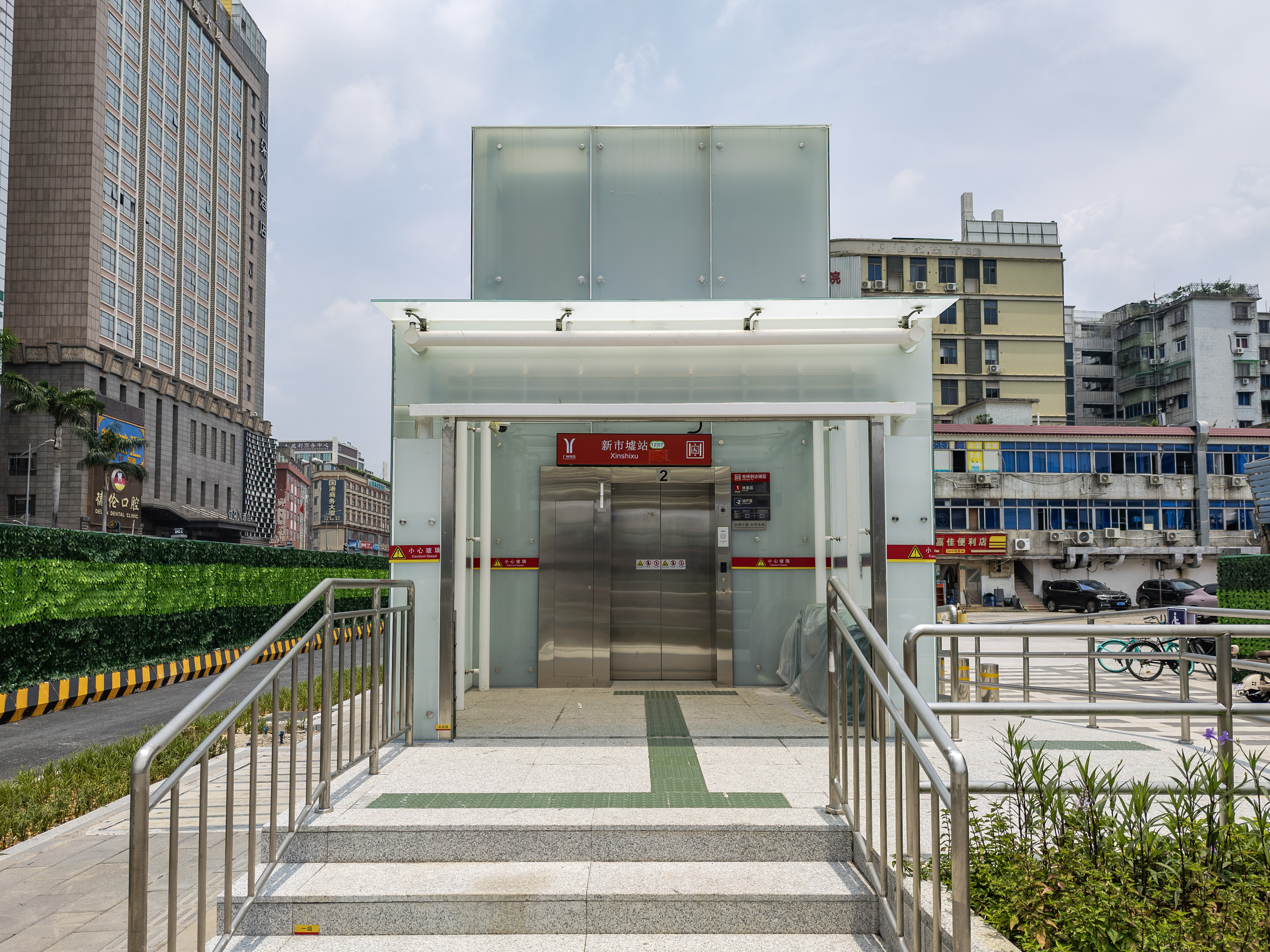
Elevator of Entrance A

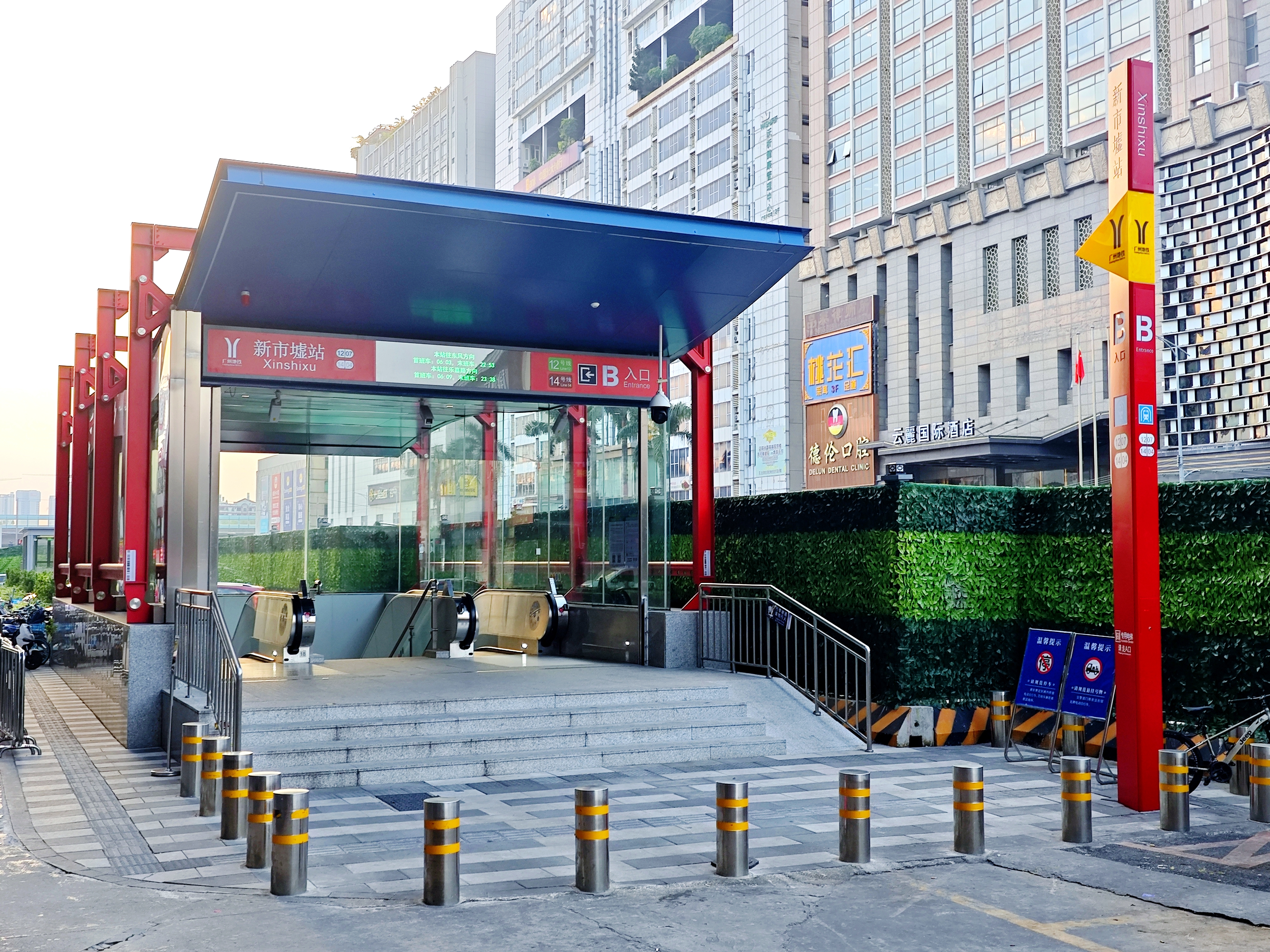
Entrance B

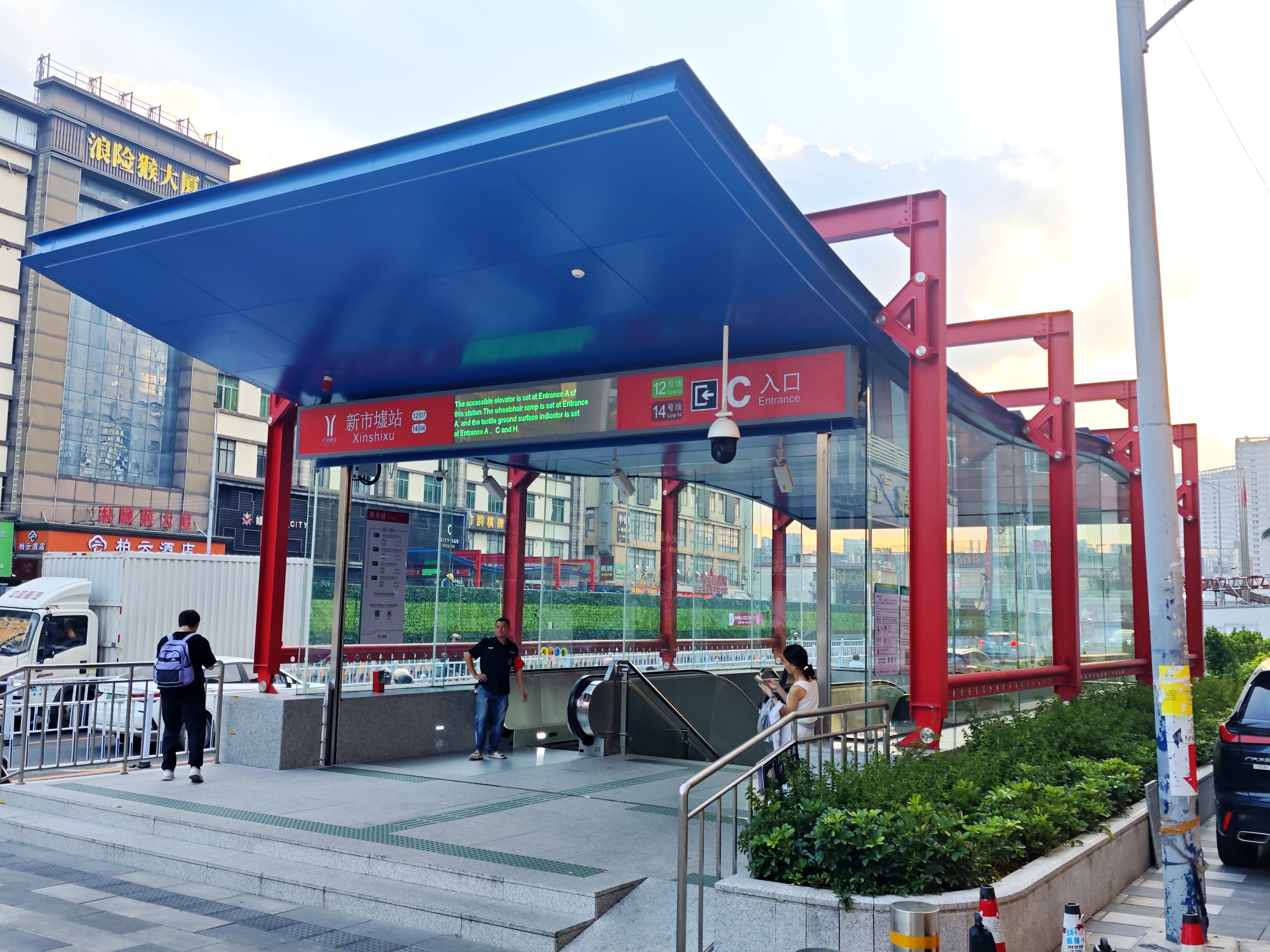
Entrance C

Entrance F

Entrance H

== History ==
The original plan for the second phase of Line 14 was to have Huangshi Road station at the intersection of the Airport Road and Huangshi Road. Later, several more stations were added to the line, and this station was moved south to its current location and renamed Xinshixu Station. Line 12 was originally planned to interchange with Line 14 at Gangbei Station (now Yunxiao Road) in the south. In order to meet the planning requirements of connecting to the Tangxi station (now Guangzhou Baiyun station), the western section of Line 12 was slightly modified to detour northward, so the interchange with Line 12 was moved to this station instead of Gangbei Station (Yunxiao Road).

On 17 May 2019, the construction site of the station began to be closed in phases for construction. The Line 12 section on Qifu Road was the first to be built; the Line 14 section on Airport Road was delayed until 2022 due to the demolition of houses. In February 2023, the houses on the construction site were demolished. The Line 12 section was the first to complete the "Three Rights" transfer on 24 April 2025.

On 8 April 2025, the preliminary names of the stations on the west section of Line 12 were announced. The authorities believed that the area referred to by "Xinshi" or "Xinshixu" had already developed into the two streets of Yuncheng and Xinshi, and continuing to use the project name might mislead passengers. Therefore, it was proposed to name it Qifu Road Station based on the road it is located on. However, many people suggested using the more well-known "Xinshixu". Finally, the authorities adopted the relevant suggestions the following month, and the station was to continue using the name of Xinshixu Station.

On 29 June 2025, the Line 12 station opened. On 29 September 2025, the Line 14 station opened.
