= Mawu station =

Guangzhou Metro Line 14 station

Mawu 马务
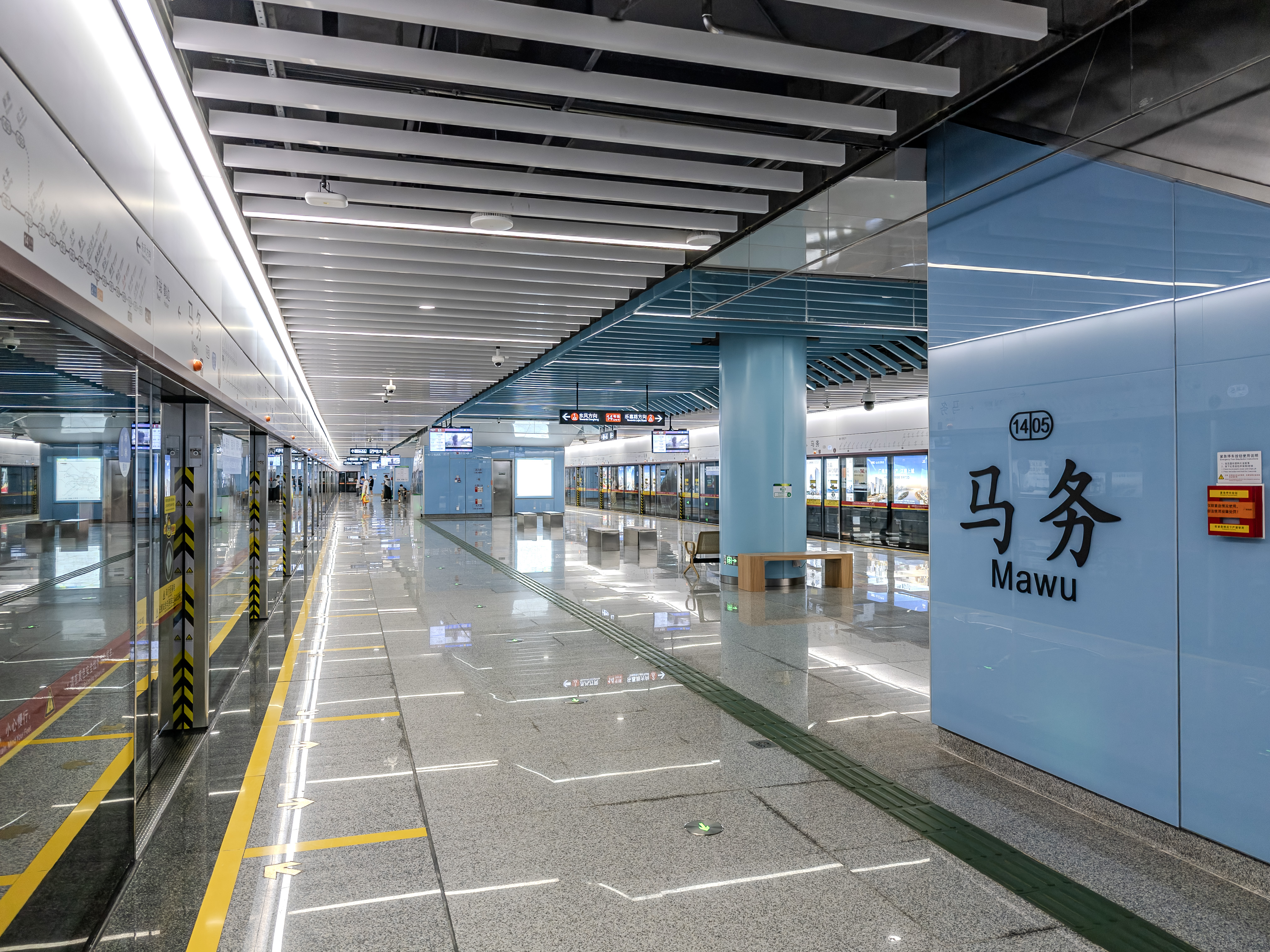
- Platform 1

Chinese name
- Simplified Chinese: 马务站
- Traditional Chinese: 馬務站
Transcriptions
Standard Mandarin
- Hanyu Pinyin: MǎWù Zhàn
Yue: Cantonese
- Yale Romanization: Máamou Jaahm
- Jyutping: maa5 mou6 zaam6

General information
- Location: Southeast of intersection between Huangshi East Road (黄石东路) and Airport Road (机场路） Yuncheng Subdistrict, Baiyun District, Guangzhou, Guangdong; China
- Coordinates: 23°12′15.08″N 113°15′30.20″E
- Operator: Guangzhou Metro Co. Ltd.
- Line: Line 14
- Platforms: 2 (1 island platform)
- Tracks: 2

Construction
- Structure type: Underground
- Accessible: Yes

Other information
- Station code: 1405

History
- Opened: 29 September 2025 (10 months ago)

Services
Preceding station	Guangzhou Metro	Following station
Xinshixu towards Lejia Road	Line 14	Hebian towards Dongfeng
Location

Mawu station (simplified Chinese: 马务站; traditional Chinese: 馬務站; pinyin: Mǎwù Zhàn; Cantonese Yale: Máamou Jaahm) is a station on Line 14 of the Guangzhou Metro. It is located on the southeast of the junction between Huangshi East Road and Airport Road in the Yuncheng Subdistrict of Baiyun District in Guangzhou. It opened on 29 September 2025.

== Station Layout ==
=== Station Floorings ===
The station has three floors and is 140 metres (460 ft) long. The ground level serves as the station's entrances and exits, and is surrounded by the Airport Road and Airport Expressway viaducts, the Huangshi Interchange, Huangshi Road, the Baiyun District People's Court, and adjacent buildings. The first underground floor serves as the station concourse, the second underground floor is the station equipment floor, and the third underground floor houses the Line 14 platform. Due to the complex surrounding environment, the main structure of the station was largely constructed using the cut-and-cover method.

=== Concourse ===
The concourse is equipped with ticket vending machines and an intelligent customer service center.

To facilitate pedestrian access, the east side of the concourse is designated as a paid area. Within this area, dedicated elevators, escalators, and stairs provide easy access to the platforms.

=== Platforms ===
The station has an island platform located underground on the east side of Airport Road. Toilets and a nursing room are located at the platform end heading towards Xinshixu.

=== Entrances/exits ===
The station has 2 points of entry/exit. Exit C is equipped with an elevator.

- A: Airport Road, Huangshi East Road, Caiyun Road, Guangzhou Baiyun District People’s Court
- C: Airport Road, Huangshi West Road
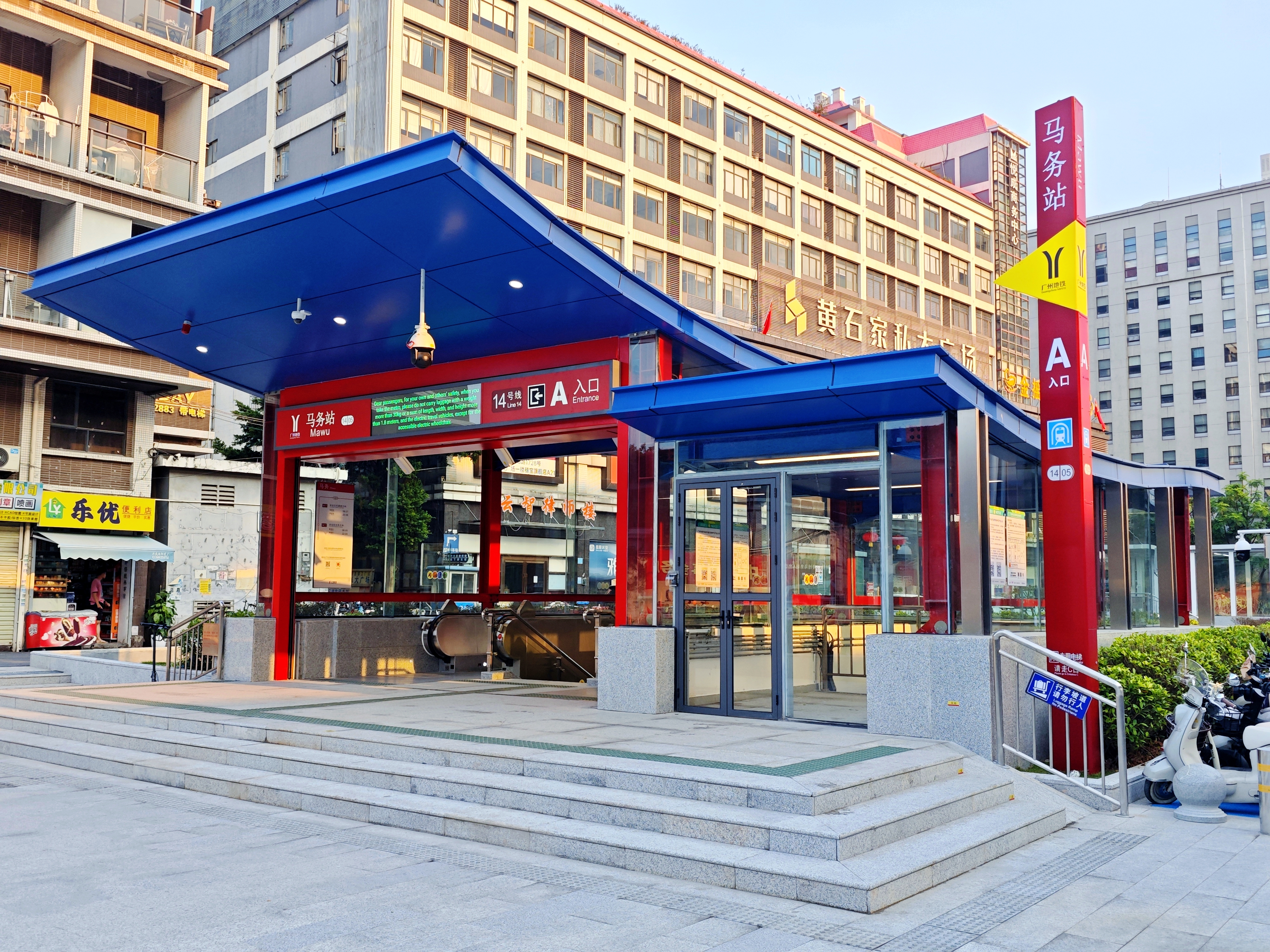
Entrance A

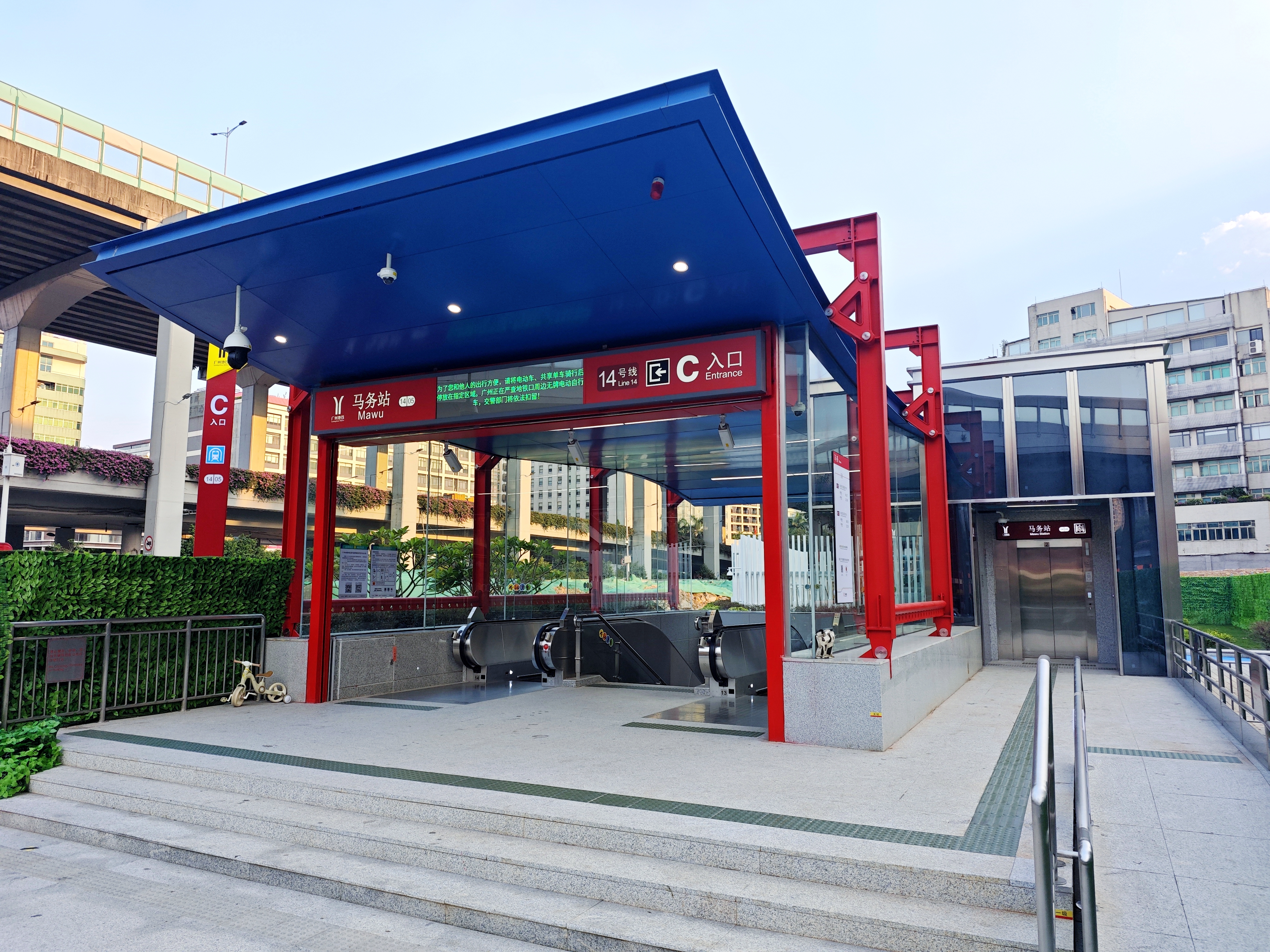
Entrance C

== Gallery ==
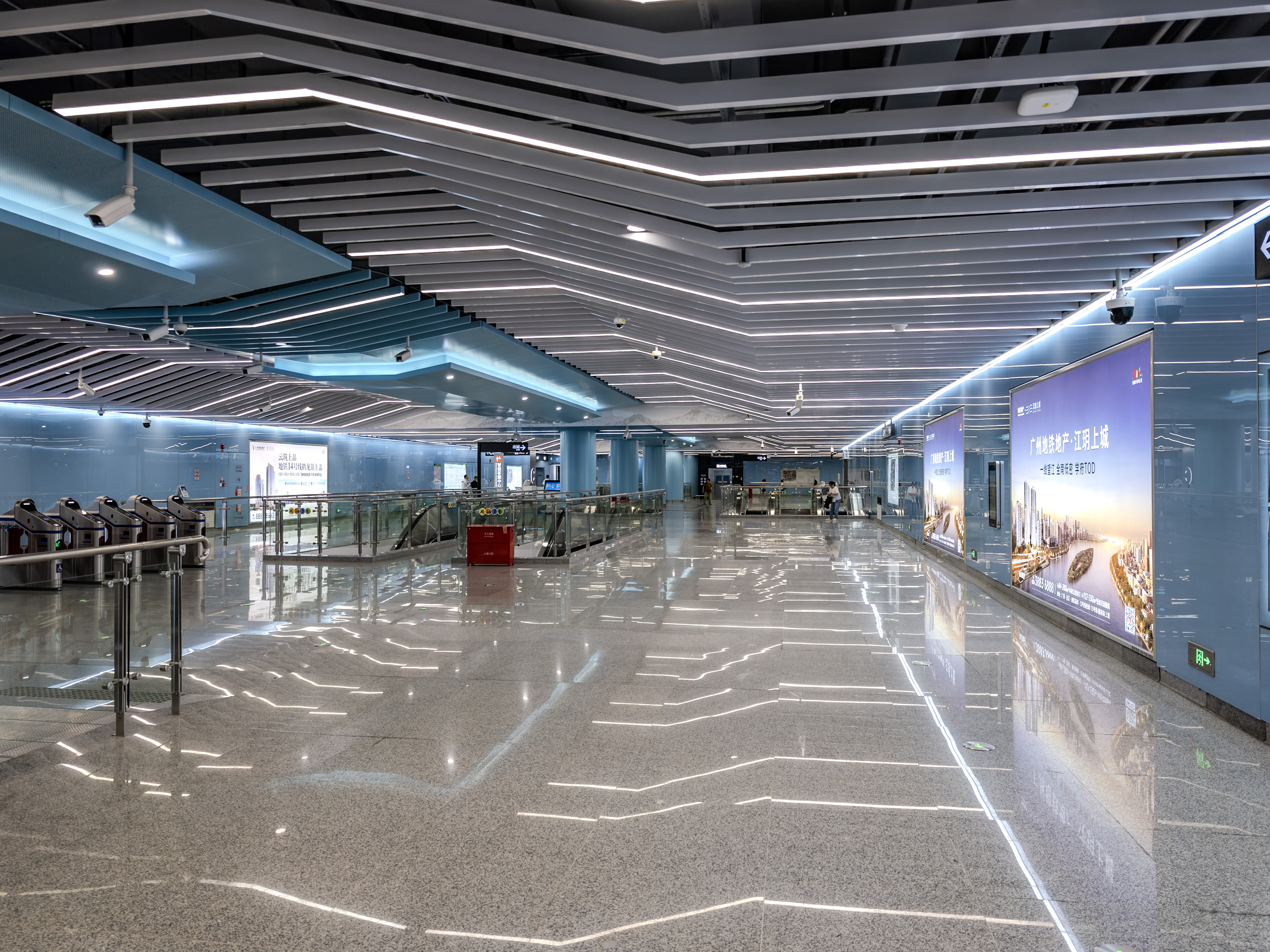
Concourse

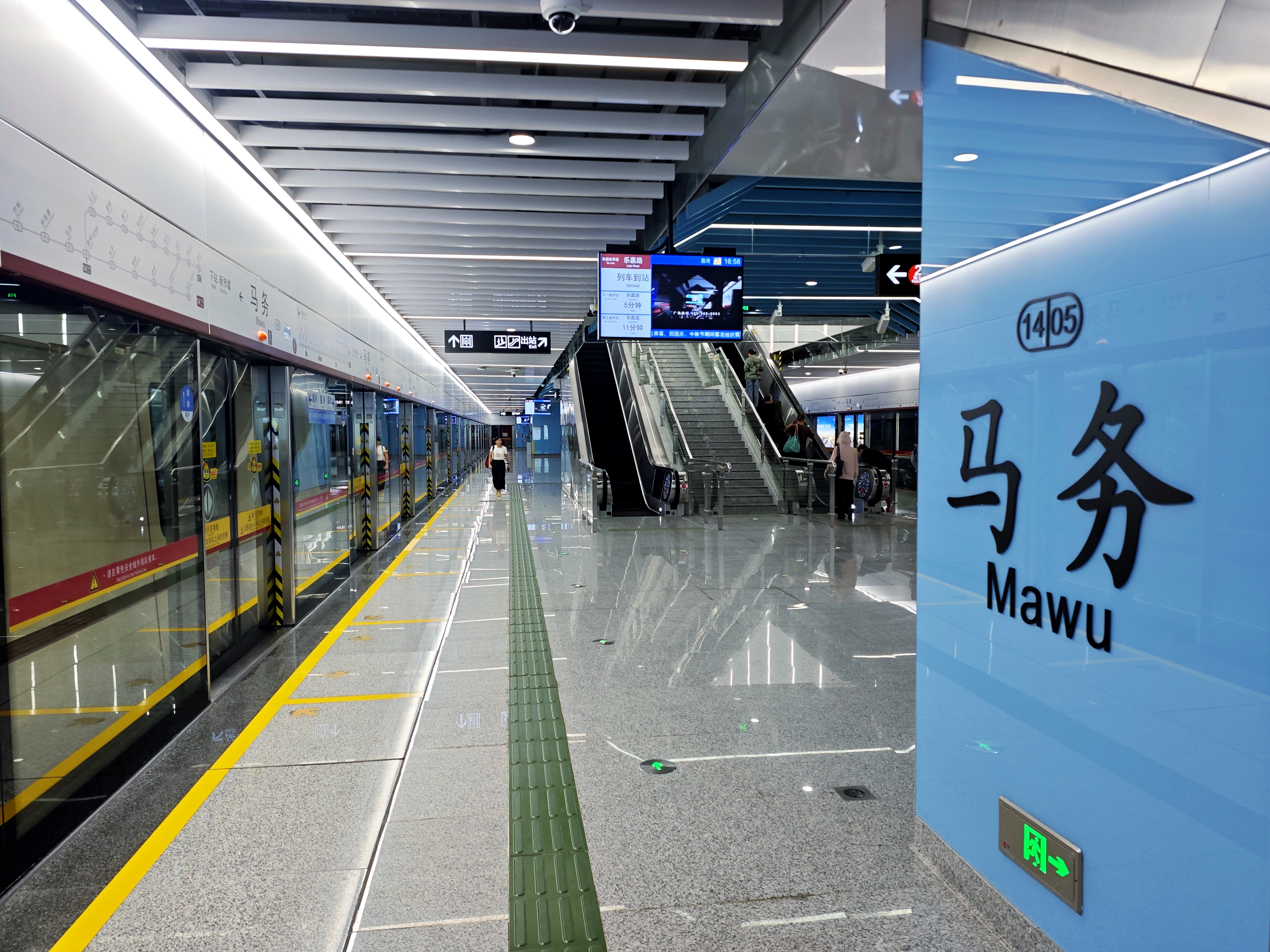
Platform 2

== History ==
The original plan for the second phase of Line 14 was to set up Huangshi Road station to the south of this station. Later, several stations were added to the line, with the original Huangshi Road Station moved south to become Xinshixu station, and this station was added to the north of the original Huangshi Road Station. Finally, the second phase of Line 14 was approved, and construction of the station was carried out. During this period, the station was named Mawu Station. In July 2025, the Guangzhou Municipal Transportation Bureau announced the preliminary station names for the second phase of Line 14, and this station retained its current name. However, this station is actually closer to a place called Huangshi, so some netizens suggested that this station be named Huangshi station and the name Mawu be reserved for the station on Line 24 to the east of this station, currently named Huangshi Station. This suggestion was ultimately not adopted by the relevant departments, and the station was officially named Mawu station in September 2025.

The station completed the bottom slab sealing in October 2023. The main structure topped out in March 2024, and the "three rights" transfer was completed in July 2025. The station was put into operation on 29 September 2025.

== Future development ==
The station is planned to be an interchange with Line 29, and a transfer node was reserved during construction.
