= Xinlong railway station =

Guangdong Intercity railway station in Guangzhou, China

Xinlong 新龙
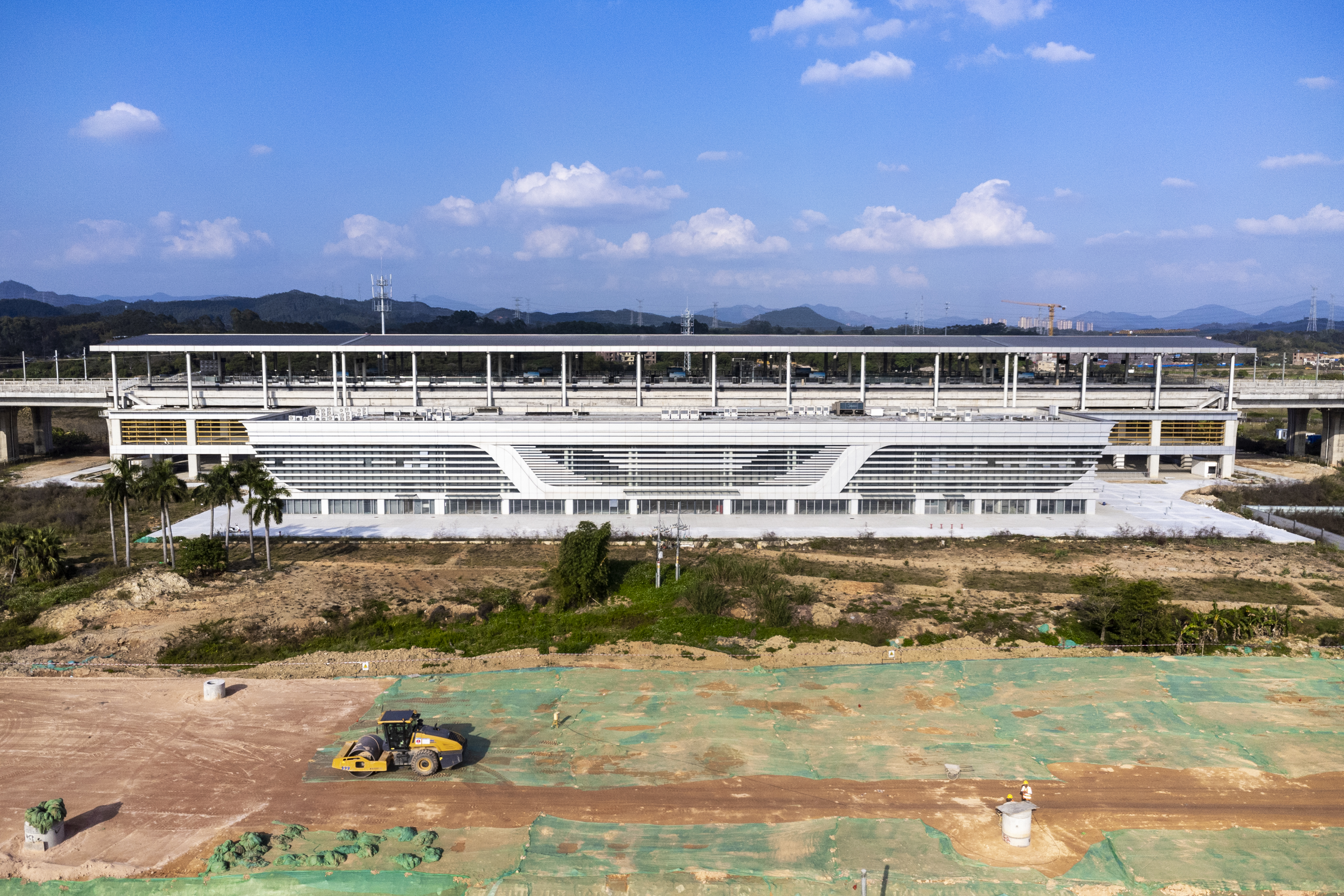
- Exterior (February 2023)

Chinese name
- Simplified Chinese: 新龙站
- Traditional Chinese: 新龍站
Transcriptions
Standard Mandarin
- Hanyu Pinyin: Xīnlóng Zhàn
Yue: Cantonese
- Yale Romanization: Sānlùng Jaahm
- Jyutping: san1 lung4 zaam6

General information
- Location: Border of Yangtian Village (洋田村) and Xintian Village (新田村); Xinlong, Huangpu District, Guangzhou, Guangdong; China
- Coordinates: 23°18′55.73″N 113°34′13.37″E
- Owner: Pearl River Delta Metropolitan Region intercity railway
- Operator: Guangdong Intercity
- Line: Guangzhou–Shenzhen intercity railway
- Platforms: 4 (2 island platforms)
- Tracks: 4

Construction
- Structure type: Elevated
- Accessible: Yes

Other information
- Station code: XLA (Pinyin: XLO)

History
- Opened: 31 July 2026 (3 months ago)

Services
Preceding station	Pearl River Delta Metropolitan Region Intercity Railway	Following station
Folang towards Zhuliao	Guangzhou–Shenzhen intercity railway	Zhenlong towards Shenzhen Airport
Location

Xinlong railway station (Chinese: 新龙站; pinyin: Xīnlóng Zhàn; Cantonese Yale: Sānlùng Jaahm) is a railway station on Suishen intercity railway located in Huangpu District, Guangzhou, Guangdong, China. It opened on 31 July 2026.

The station is located in the Sino-Singapore Guangzhou Knowledge City Science and Education Innovation Zone, surrounded by higher education institutions such as Guangzhou University Huangpu Campus and Xi'an University of Electronic Science and Technology Guangzhou Research Institute.

== Features ==
The station has a total construction area of approximately 19,000 square meters and is an elevated station located along the roadside. The side station building has two above-ground floors one underground floor, and its exterior incorporates design elements such as the ocean and waves.

There are two elevated island platforms. There is a single crossover line on each of the north and south sides of this station, allowing for train turnback.

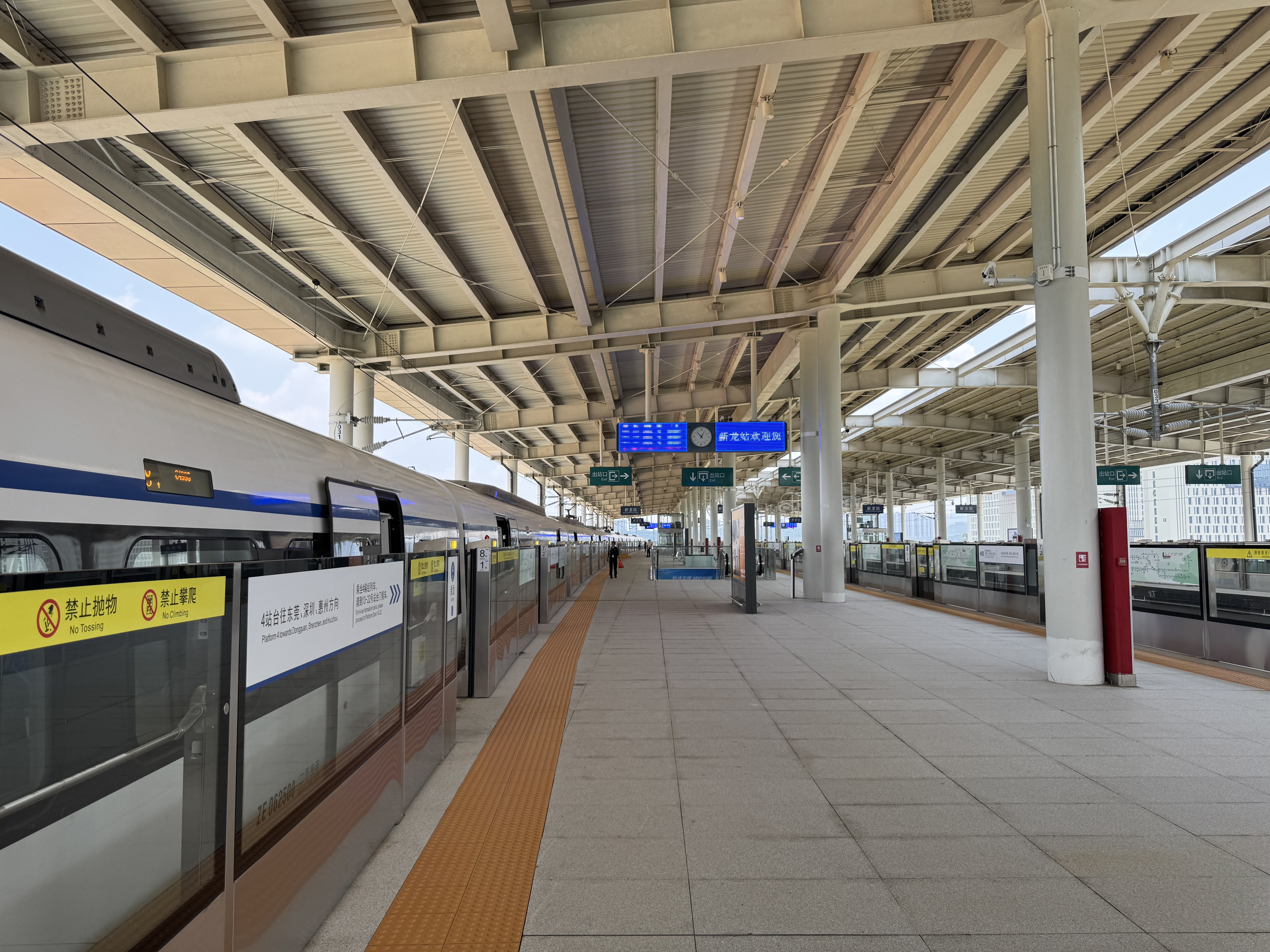
Platform 4

=== Entrances/exits ===
The station has 4 points of entry/exit, currently only 2 have been opened.

- A: Shuren Road (S)
- B: Shuren Road (S)
- ~~C1~~: (not open)
- ~~C2~~: (not open)

== Transfers ==
There are no regular bus stops near the station, but there are responsive ride-hailing bus stops to meet passengers' connection needs. Tangcun station on the Knowledge City branch of Line 14 is the closest metro station, which is about a 30-minute walk away.

== History ==
During planning and construction, the station was called Pinggang station (平岗). On 14 January 2020, the station topped out. On 2 February 2021, it was officially named Xinlong station.

On 31 July 2026, the station opened with the northern extension of the Suishen intercity railway.
