= Fengxia station =

Fengxia station may refer to the following stations:

- Fengxia station (Guangzhou Metro), a station on Line 14 of the Guangzhou Metro in China
- Fengxia station (Nanchang Metro), a station on Line 2 of the Nanchang Metro in China
