= Hongwei station =

Metro station in Guangzhou, China

Coordinates: 23°23′57″N 113°29′15″E

Hongwei 红卫
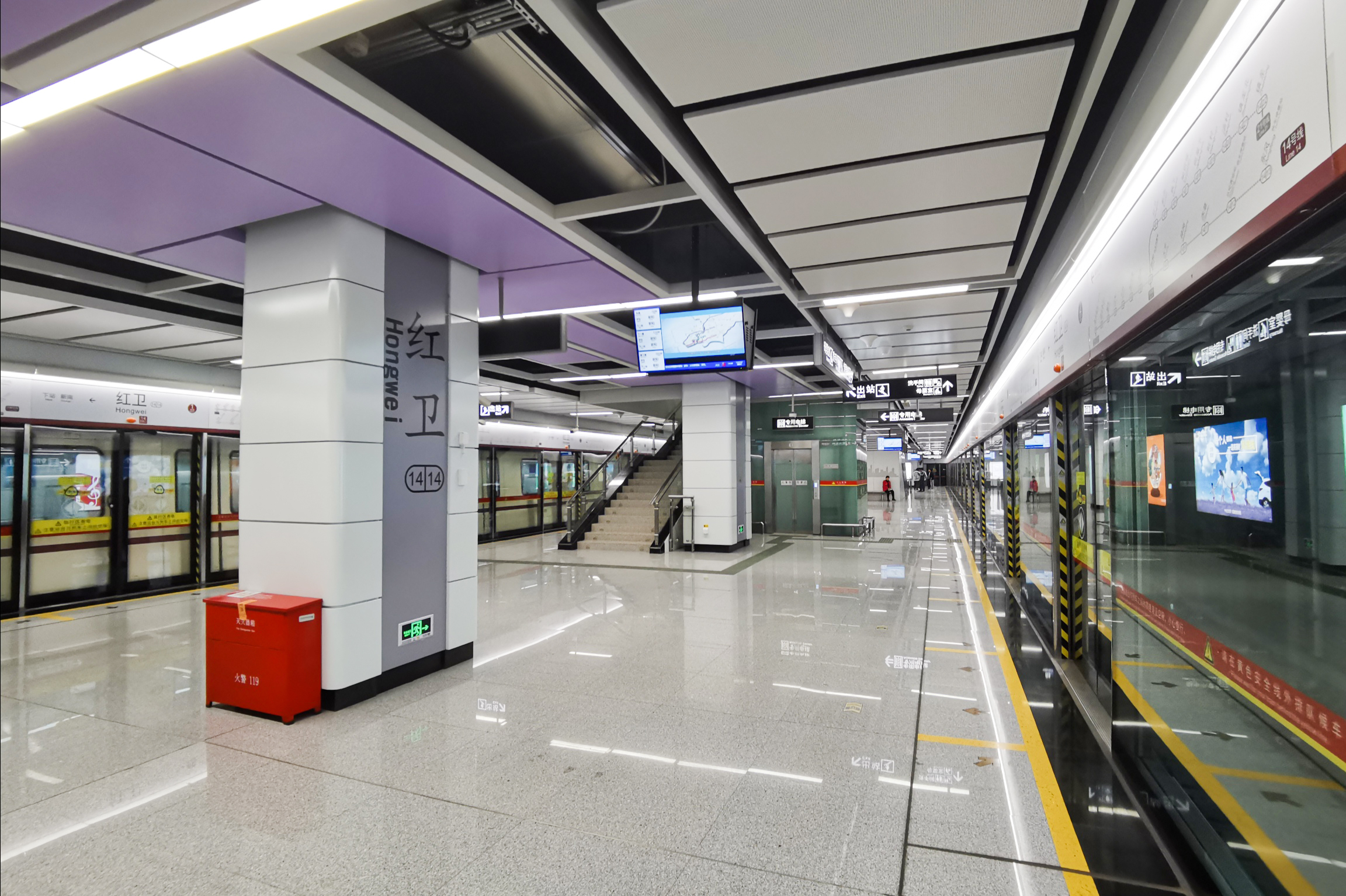
- Platform

Chinese name
- Simplified Chinese: 红卫站
- Traditional Chinese: 紅衛站
Transcriptions
Standard Mandarin
- Hanyu Pinyin: Hóngwèi Zhàn
Yue: Cantonese
- Jyutping: hung^{4}wai^{6} zaam^{6}

General information
- Location: Jiulong Avenue (九龙大道); Huangpu District, Guangzhou, Guangdong; China
- Operator: Guangzhou Metro Co. Ltd.
- Line: Line 14
- Platforms: 2 (1 island platform)
- Tracks: 2

Construction
- Structure type: Underground
- Accessible: Yes

Other information
- Station code: 1422

History
- Opened: 28 December 2017; 8 years ago

Services
Preceding station	Guangzhou Metro	Following station
Xinhe Terminus	Line 14 Branch (Knowledge City Line)	Xinnan towards Zhenlong
Location

Hongwei station (Chinese: 红卫站) is a station of Line 14 of the Guangzhou Metro. It started operations on 28 December 2017.

== Station layout ==
G	-	Exits
L1; Concourse	Lobby	Customer Service, Vending machines, ATMs
L2; Platforms	Platform 2	14 towards Xinhe (terminus)
L2; Platforms	Island platform, doors will open on the left
L2; Platforms	Platform 1	14 towards Zhenlong (Xinnan)

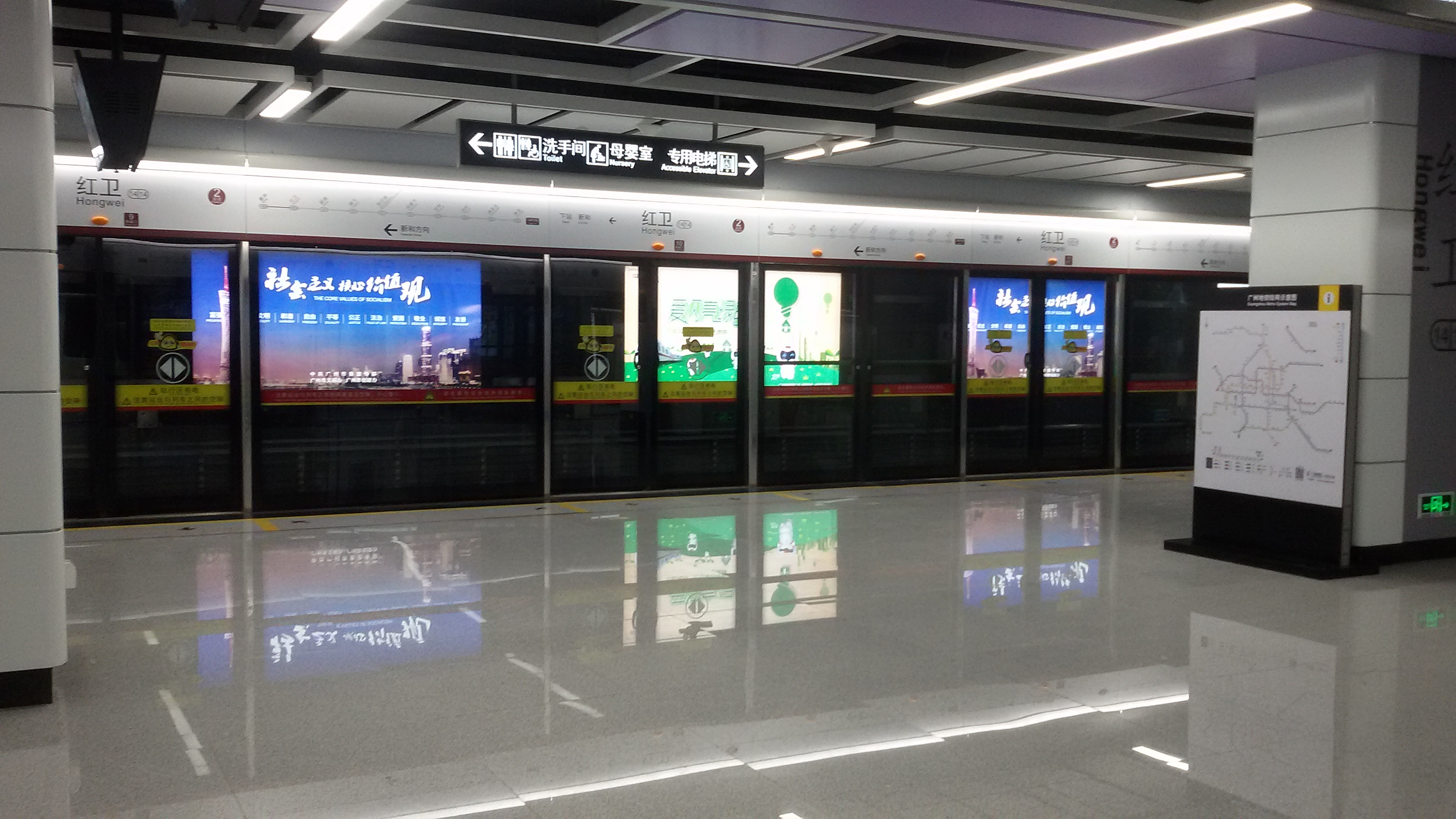
Platform of Hongwei

== Exits ==
Exit number		Exit location
Exit A		Jiulong Dadao
Exit B	B1	Jiulong Dadao
Exit B	B2	Jiulong Dadao
