= Jiufo railway station =

Guangdong Intercity railway station in Guangzhou, China

Jiufo 九佛
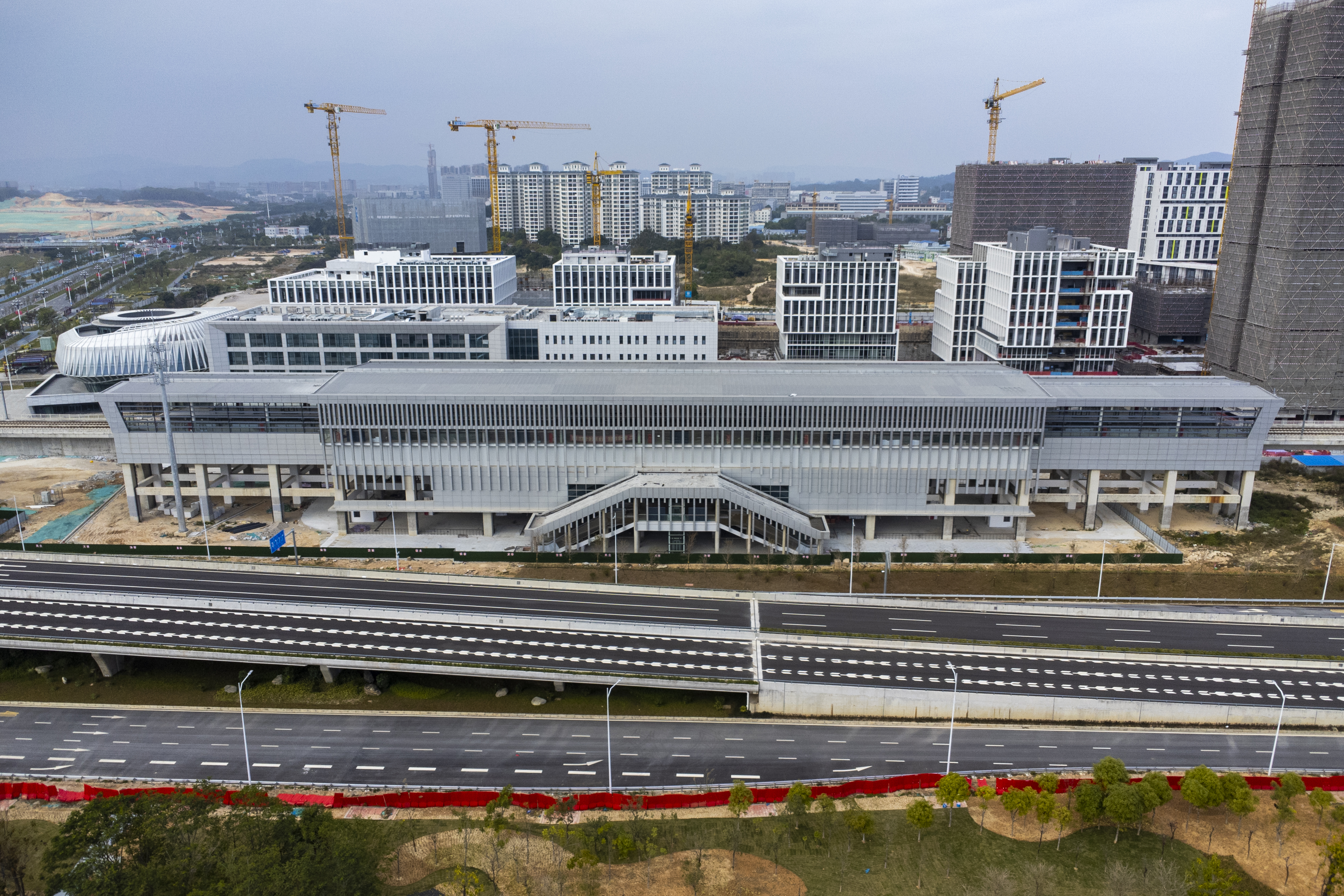
- Exterior (January 2023)

Chinese name
- Chinese: 九佛站
Transcriptions
Standard Mandarin
- Hanyu Pinyin: Jiǔfó Zhàn
Yue: Cantonese
- Yale Romanization: Gáufaht Jaahm
- Jyutping: gau2 fat6 zaam6

General information
- Location: Intersection of Knowledge Avenue (知识大道) and Zhongtai Expressway (钟太快速路); Jiufo Subdistrict, Huangpu District, Guangzhou, Guangdong; China
- Coordinates: 23°22′41.63″N 113°29′34.37″E
- Owner: Pearl River Delta Metropolitan Region intercity railway
- Operator: Guangdong Intercity
- Line: Guangzhou–Shenzhen intercity railway
- Platforms: 2 (2 side platforms)
- Tracks: 2
- Connections: 14 Xinnan

Construction
- Structure type: Elevated
- Accessible: Yes

Other information
- Station code: JFA (Pinyin: JFO)

History
- Opened: 31 July 2026 (3 months ago)

Services
Preceding station	Pearl River Delta Metropolitan Region Intercity Railway	Following station
Zhongluotan East towards Zhuliao	Guangzhou–Shenzhen intercity railway	Folang towards Shenzhen Airport
Location

Jiufo railway station (Chinese: 九佛站; pinyin: Jiǔfó Zhàn; Cantonese Yale: Gáufaht Jaahm) is a railway station on Suishen intercity railway located in Huangpu District, Guangzhou, Guangdong, China. It opened on 31 July 2026.

== Features ==
The station has a total construction area of approximately 50,000 square meters. Its exterior design incorporates elements of origami and papercutting, showcasing traditional folk culture.

There are two elevated side platforms.

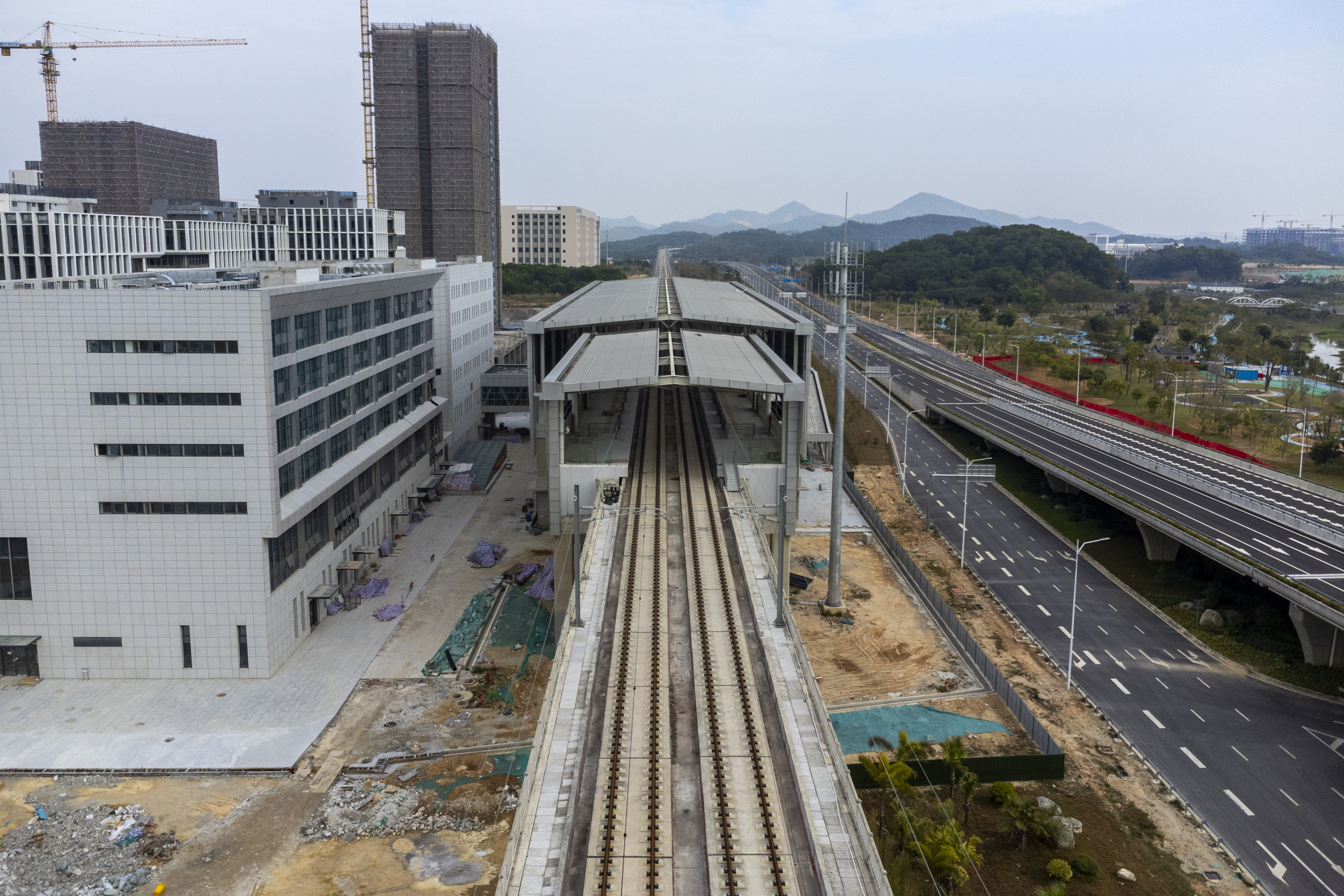
Station track (January 2023)

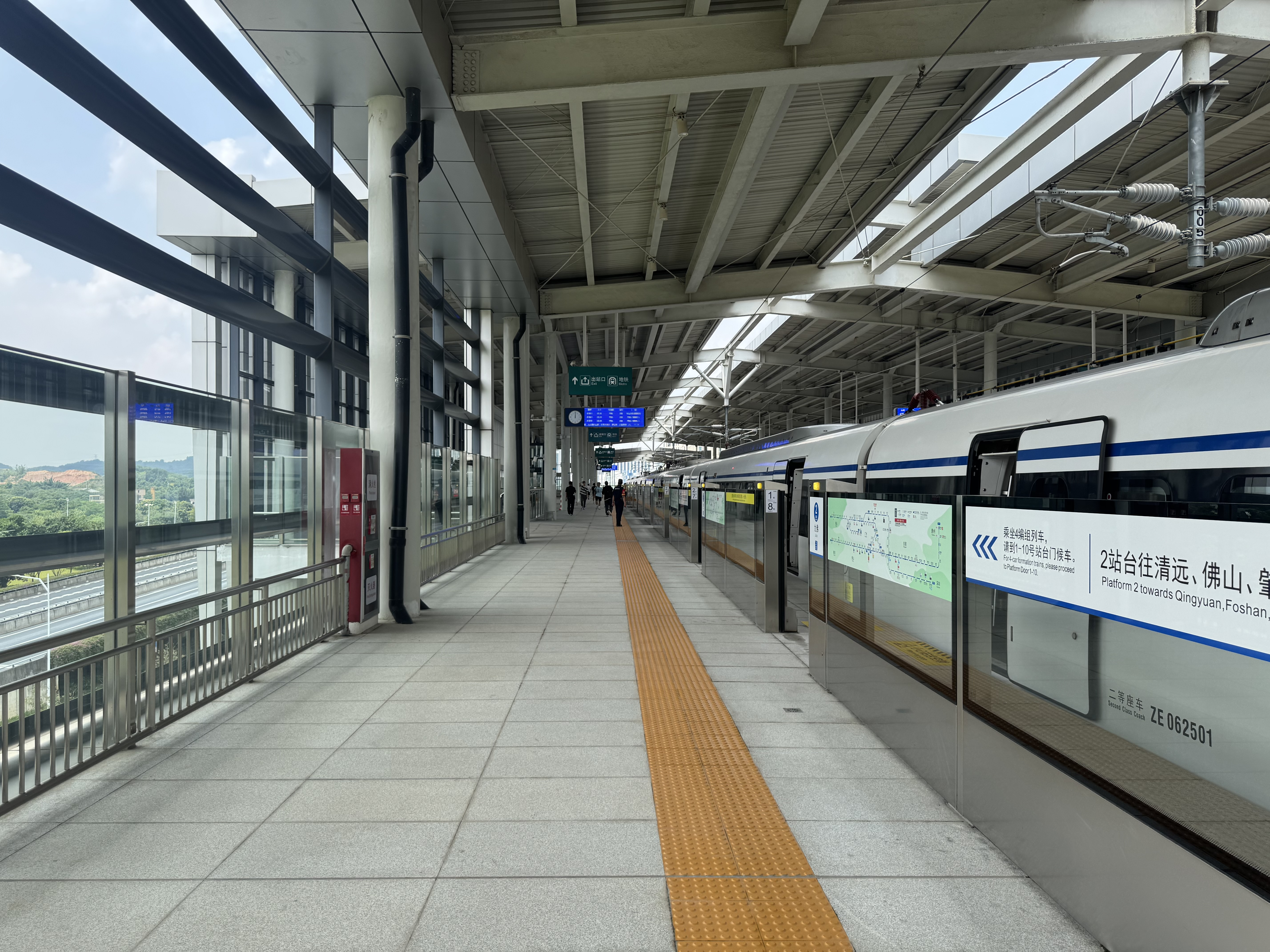
Platform 2

=== Entrances/exits ===
The station has 6 points of entry/exit, currently only 4 have been opened.

- ~~A~~: (not open)
- ~~B~~: (not open)
- C: Knowledge Avenue, 14 Xinnan
- D: Knowledge Avenue
- E1: Zhongtai Expressway
- E2: Zhongtai Expressway

== Transfer ==
The station provides an out-of-station interchange (OSI) at its northwestern side with Xinnan station on the Knowledge City Line of Line 14. Passengers can exit from Exit C of this station and then proceed to Entrance B via surface level to transfer. A covered walkway will be built along this section in the future. There is also a bus stop opposite Exit D.

== History ==
During planning and construction, the station was called Matouzhuang station (马头庄). On 2 February 2021, it was officially named Jiufo station.

Construction of the station commenced in early 2019, and on 26 June the same year, the drilling of the first pile foundation for the station successfully commenced. On 18 June 2021, the station topped out.

On 31 July 2026, the station opened with the northern extension of the Suishen intercity railway.
