= Wangcun station =

Guangzhou Metro station

Coordinates: 23°19′24″N 113°33′06″E

Wangcun 旺村
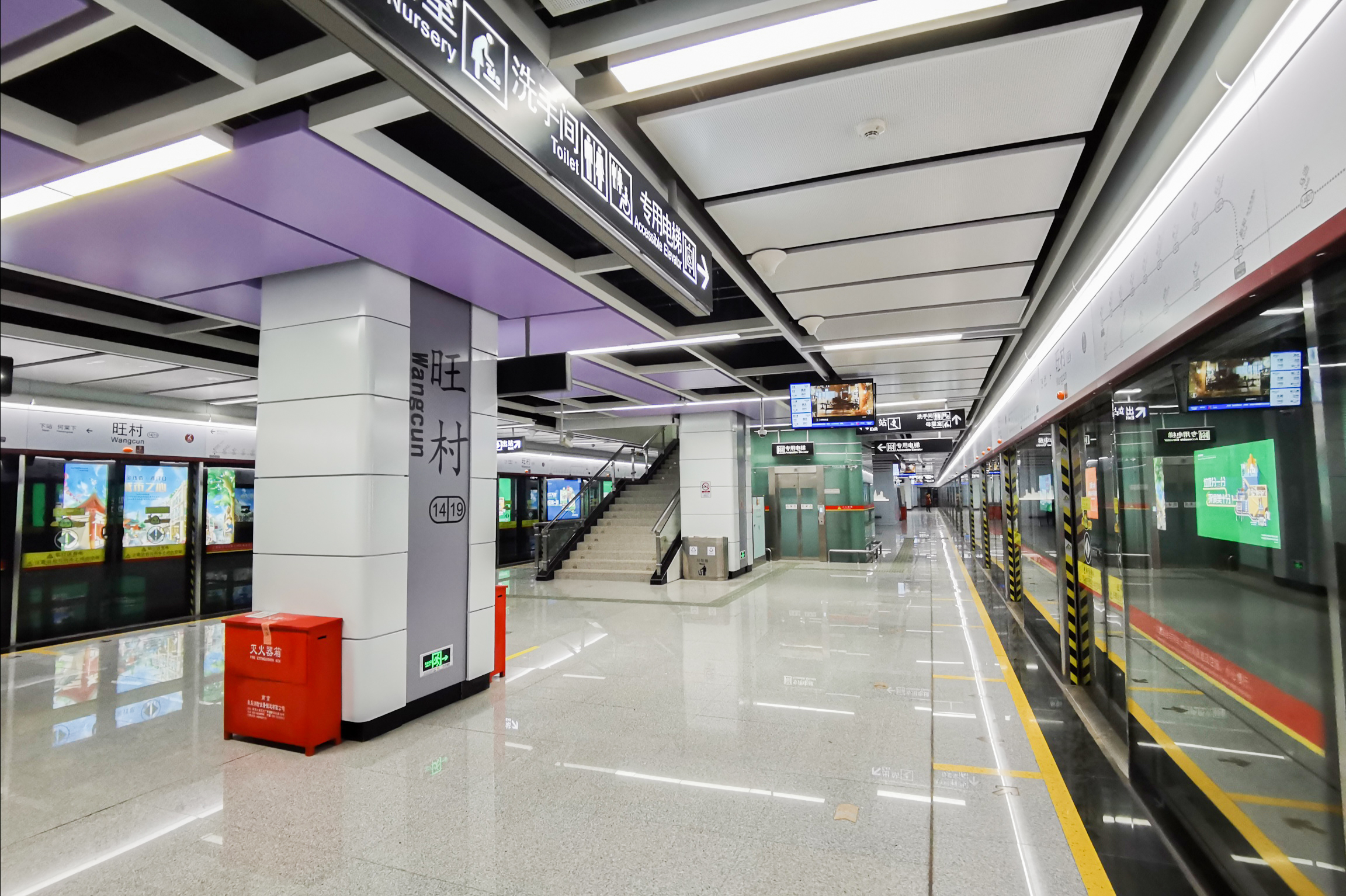
- Platform

General information
- Location: Jiulong Avenue (九龙大道) near Fenghu No. 1 Road (凤湖一路); Huangpu District, Guangzhou, Guangdong; China
- Operator: Guangzhou Metro Co. Ltd.
- Line: Line 14
- Platforms: 2 (1 island platform)
- Tracks: 2

Construction
- Structure type: Underground
- Accessible: Yes

Other information
- Station code: 1427

History
- Opened: 28 December 2017; 8 years ago

Services
Preceding station	Guangzhou Metro	Following station
Hetangxia towards Xinhe	Line 14 Branch (Knowledge City Line)	Tangcun towards Zhenlong
Location

Wangcun station (Chinese: 旺村站; pinyin: Wàngcūn Zhàn; Jyutping: wong^{6}cyun^{1} zaam^{6}) is a station of Line 14 of the Guangzhou Metro. It started operations on 28 December 2017.

== Station Layout ==
The station has an underground island platform.

== Exits ==
There are 3 exits, lettered A, B and C. Exit A is accessible. All exits are located on Jiulong Avenue.
