= Hetangxia station =

Guangzhou Metro station

Coordinates: 23°19′52″N 113°32′37″E

Hetangxia 何棠下
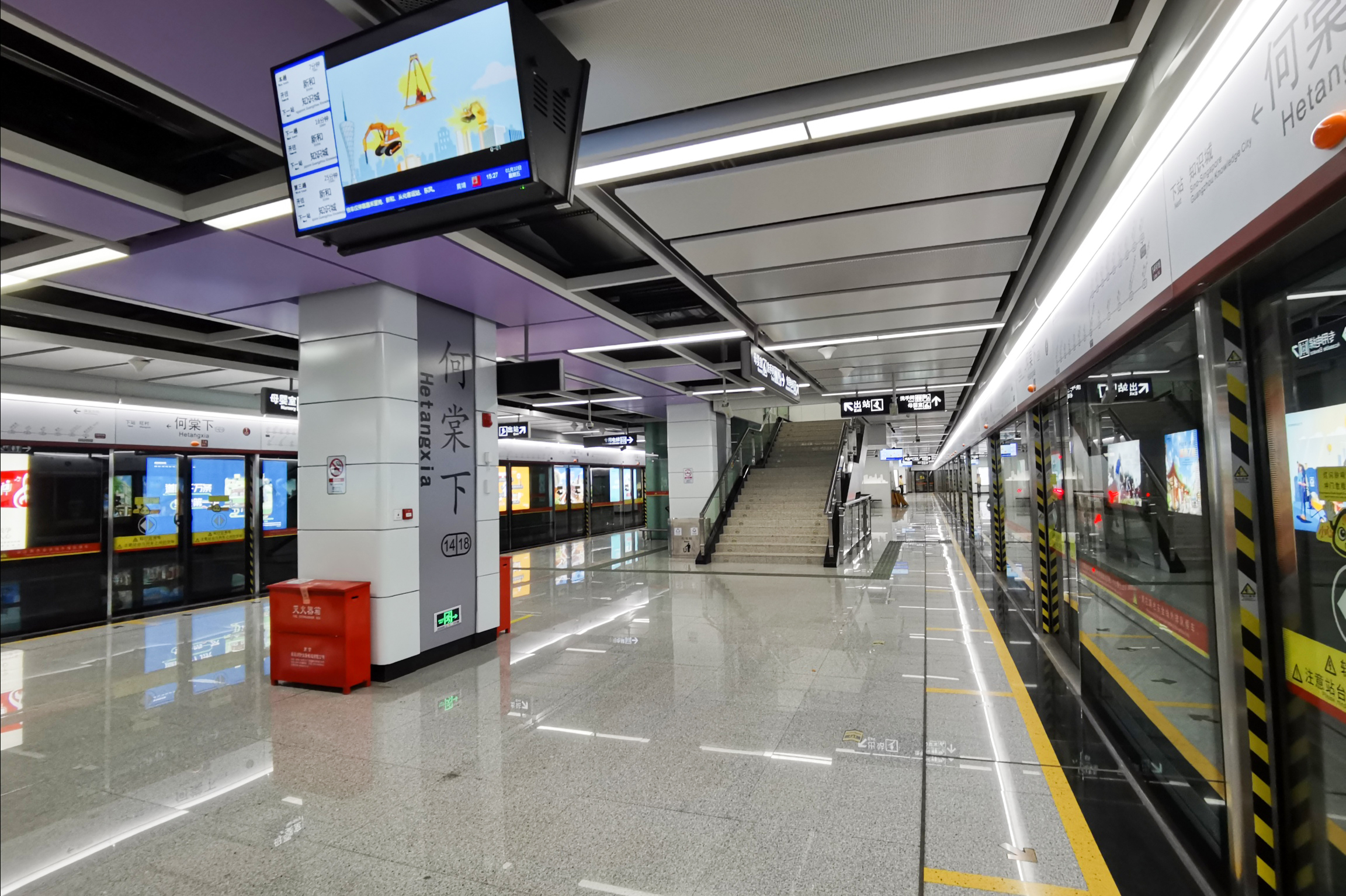
- Platform

General information
- Location: Jiulong Avenue (九龙大道); Huangpu District, Guangzhou, Guangdong; China
- Operator: Guangzhou Metro Co. Ltd.
- Line: Line 14
- Platforms: 2 (1 island platform)
- Tracks: 2

Construction
- Structure type: Underground
- Accessible: Yes

Other information
- Station code: 1426

History
- Opened: 28 December 2017; 8 years ago

Services
Preceding station	Guangzhou Metro	Following station
Sino-Singapore Guangzhou Knowledge City towards Xinhe	Line 14 Branch (Knowledge City Line)	Wangcun towards Zhenlong
Location

Hetangxia station (Chinese: 何棠下站; pinyin: Hétángxià Zhàn; Jyutping: ho^{4}tong^{4}haa^{6} zaam^{6}) is a station of Line 14 of the Guangzhou Metro. It started operations on 28 December 2017.

== Station Layout ==
The station has an underground island platform.

== Exits ==
There are 4 exits, lettered A, B, C and D. Exit D is accessible. All exits are located on Jiulong Avenue.
