= Folang railway station =

Guangdong Intercity railway station in Guangzhou, China

Folang 佛塱
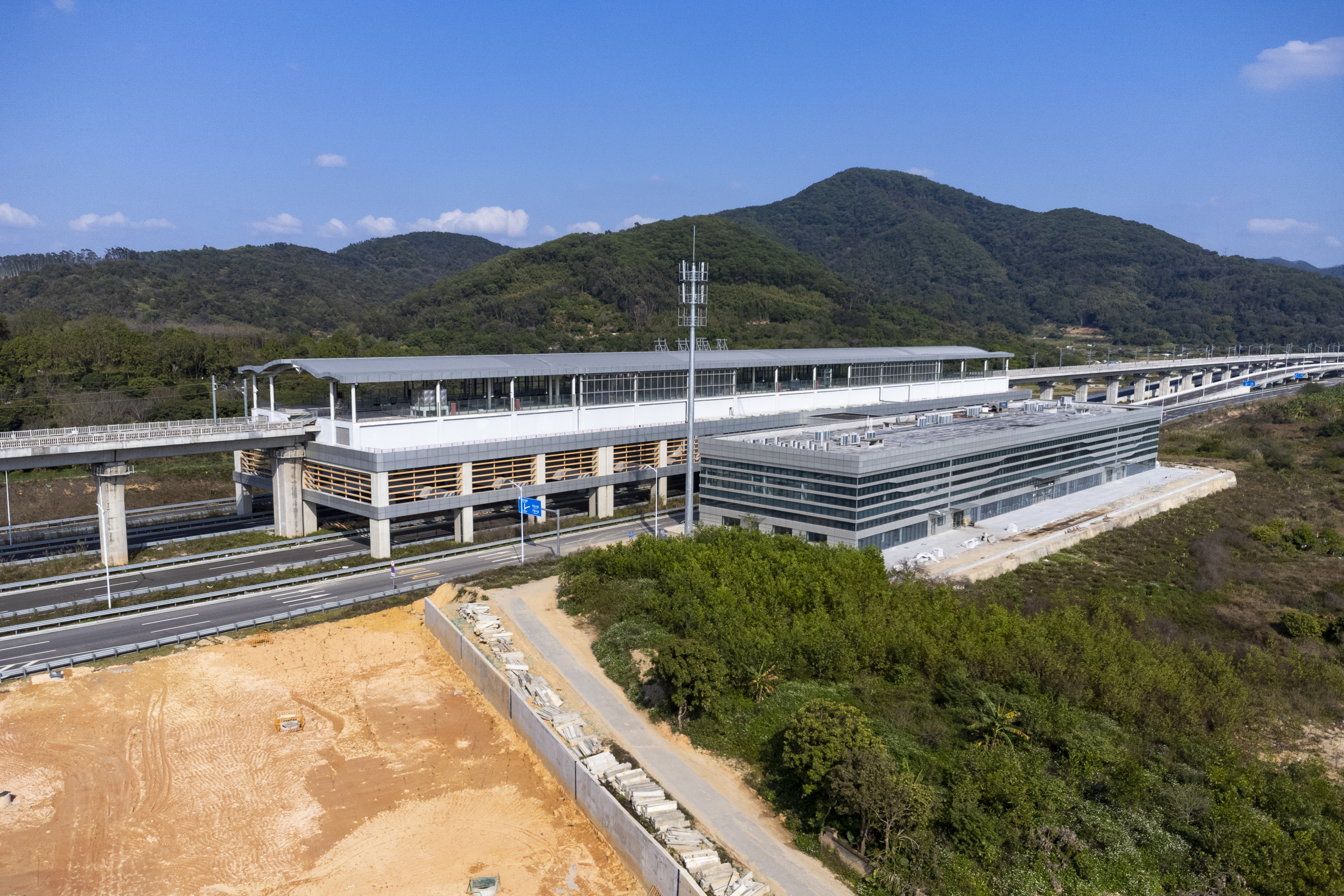
- Exterior (February 2023)

Chinese name
- Chinese: 佛塱站
Transcriptions
Standard Mandarin
- Hanyu Pinyin: Fólǎng Zhàn
Yue: Cantonese
- Yale Romanization: Fahtlóhng Jaahm
- Jyutping: fat6 long5 zaam6

General information
- Location: Folang Village, Jiufo Expressway; Jiufo Subdistrict, Huangpu District, Guangzhou, Guangdong; China
- Coordinates: 23°22′2.17″N 113°32′1.18″E
- Owner: Pearl River Delta Metropolitan Region intercity railway
- Operator: Guangdong Intercity
- Line: Guangzhou–Shenzhen intercity railway
- Platforms: 2 (2 side platforms)
- Tracks: 2

Construction
- Structure type: Elevated
- Accessible: Yes

Other information
- Station code: FLA

History
- Opened: 31 July 2026 (3 months ago)

Services
Preceding station	Pearl River Delta Metropolitan Region Intercity Railway	Following station
Jiufo towards Zhuliao	Guangzhou–Shenzhen intercity railway	Xinlong towards Shenzhen Airport
Location

Folang railway station (Chinese: 佛塱站; pinyin: Fólǎng Zhàn; Cantonese Yale: Fahtlóhng Jaahm) is a railway station on Suishen intercity railway located in Huangpu District, Guangzhou, Guangdong, China. It opened on 31 July 2026.

== Features ==
The station is an elevated station in the middle of the Jiufo Expressway. It has 3 floors with a total construction area of 10,000 square meters.

There are two elevated side platforms.

Station track (2023)

Concourse

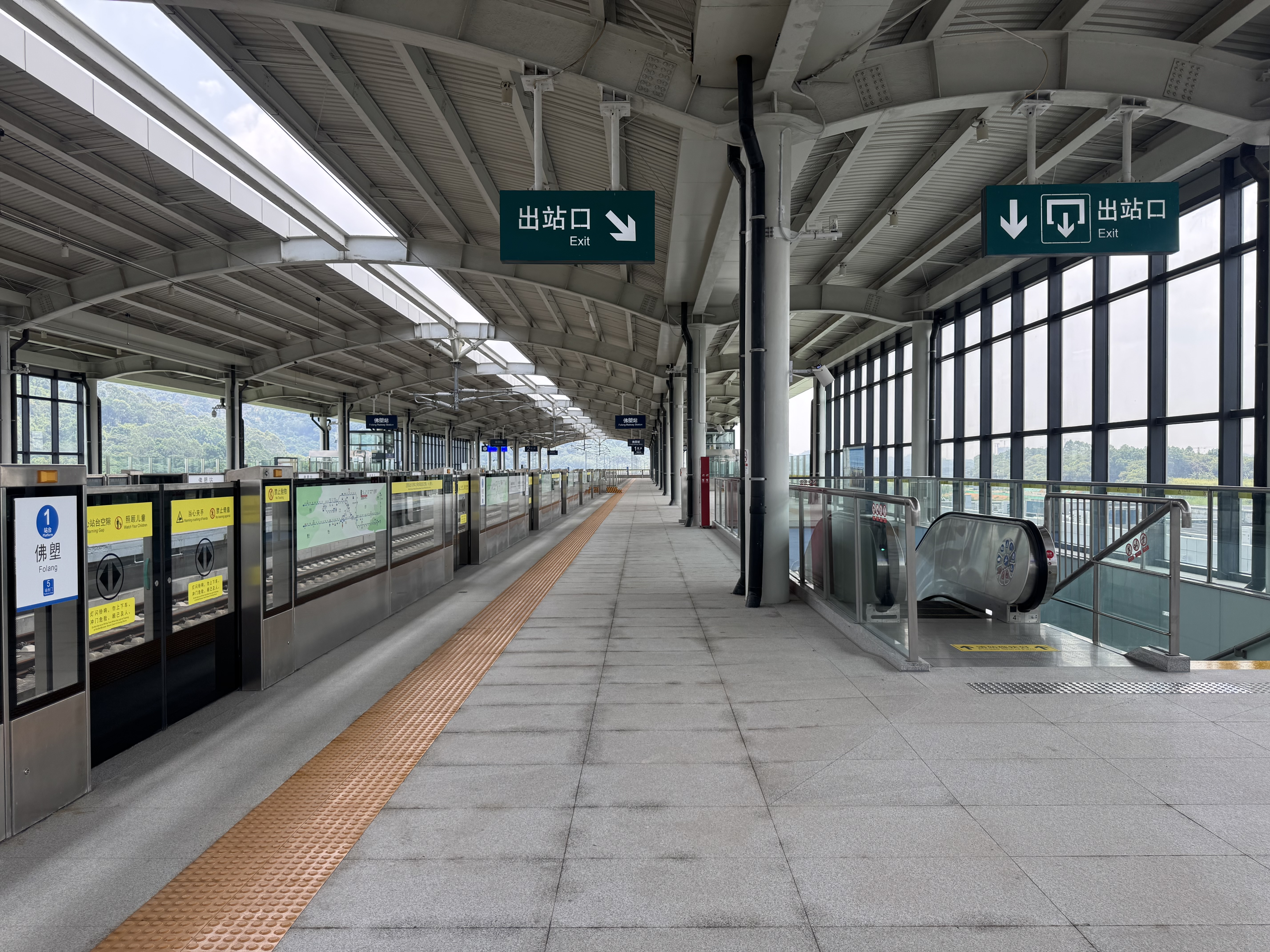
Platform 1

=== Entrances/exits ===
The station has 4 points of entry/exit, currently only 2 have been opened.

- A: Nanpu Road
- B: Jiufo Expressway
- ~~C1~~: (not open)
- ~~C2~~: (not open)
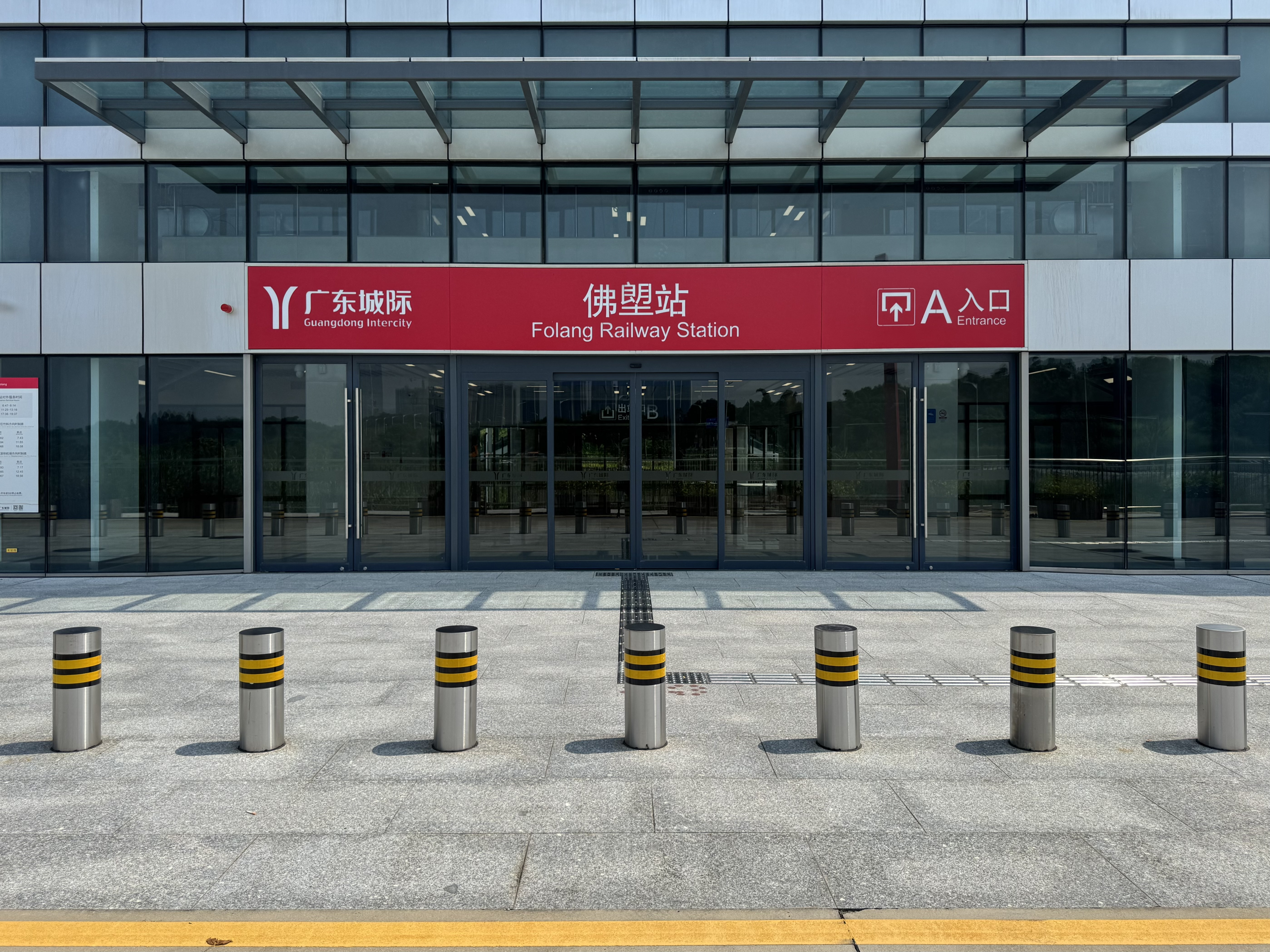
Entrance A

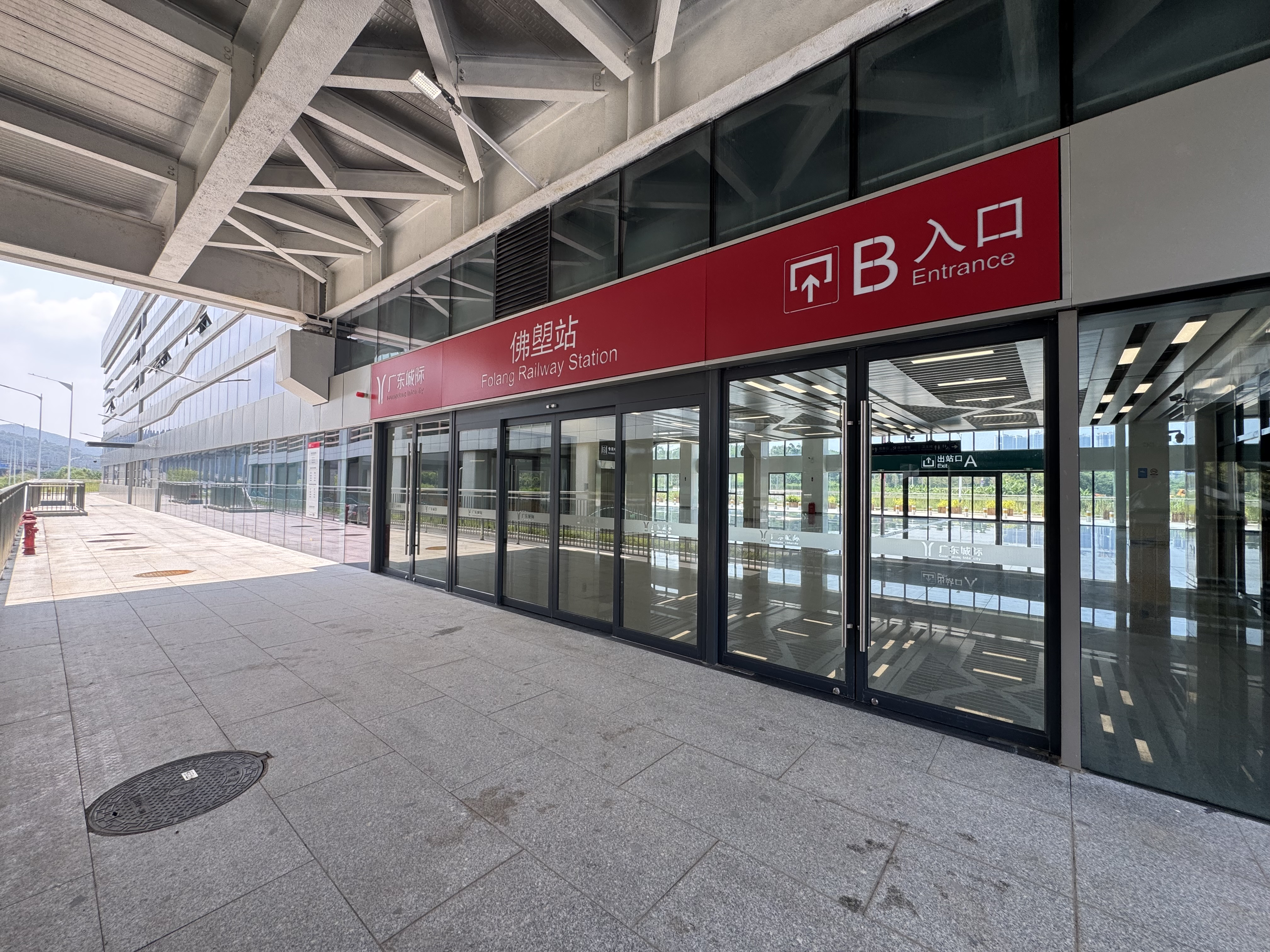
Entrance B

== Usage ==
The area around the station is not yet fully developed. In the early days of operation, only one pair of trains stopped at each station in the morning, noon, and evening. After the timetable was adjusted on 19 September 2026, it became two pairs of trains stopping at each station in the morning, noon and evening, and all other trains did not stop at the station.

== History ==
During planning and construction, the station was called Folangcun station (佛塱村). On 27 December 2019, the station topped out. On 2 February 2021, it was officially named Folang station.

On 31 July 2026, the station opened with the northern extension of the Suishen intercity railway.
