= Xinnan station =

Guangzhou Metro station

Coordinates: 23°22′38″N 113°29′43″E

Xinnan 新南
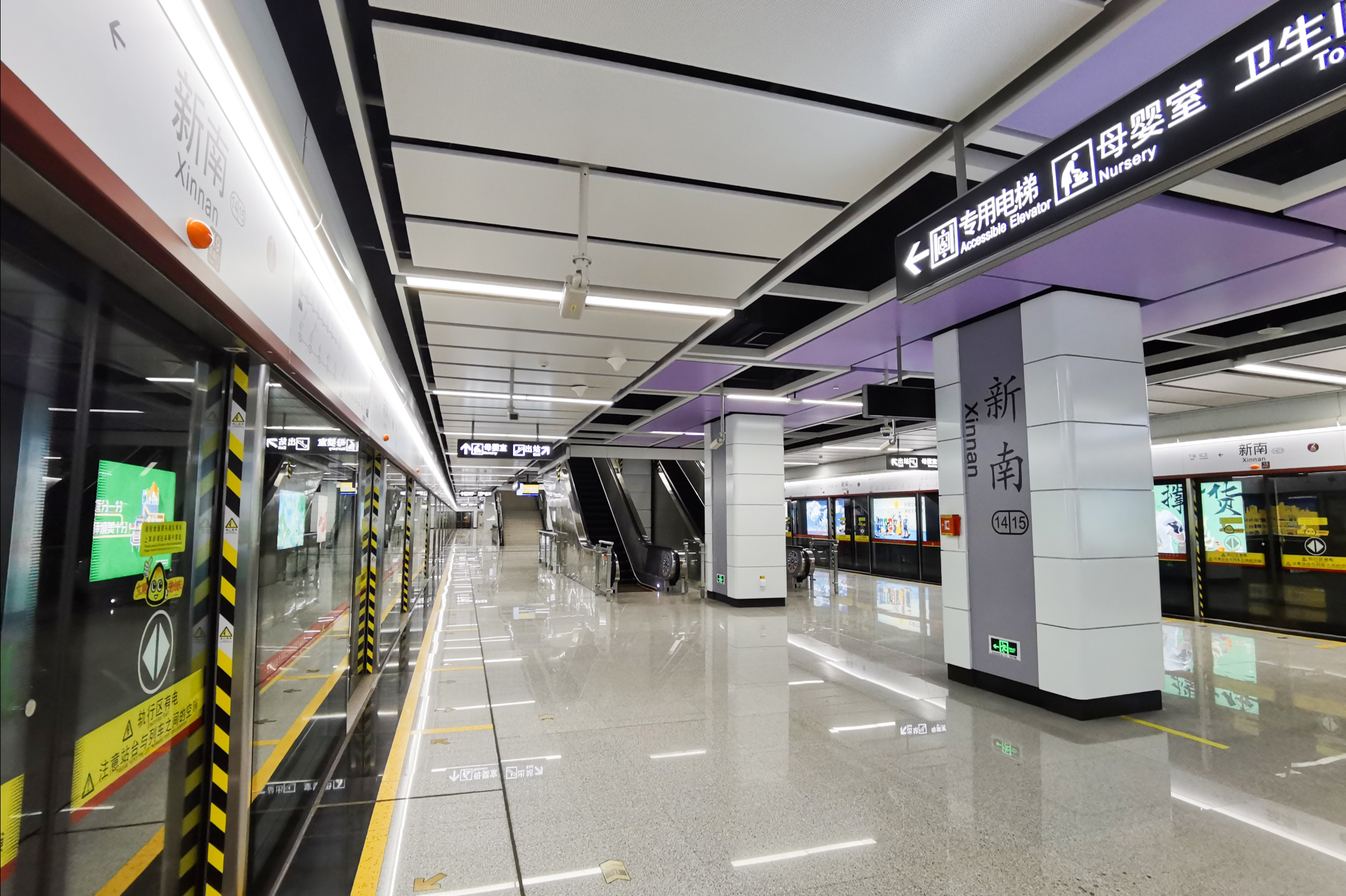
- Platform

General information
- Location: Jiulong Avenue (九龙大道); Huangpu District, Guangzhou, Guangdong; China
- Operator: Guangzhou Metro Co. Ltd.
- Line: Line 14
- Platforms: 2 (1 island platform)
- Tracks: 2
- Connections: Jiufo

Construction
- Structure type: Underground
- Accessible: Yes

Other information
- Station code: 1423

History
- Opened: 28 December 2017; 8 years ago

Services
Preceding station	Guangzhou Metro	Following station
Hongwei towards Xinhe	Line 14 Branch (Knowledge City Line)	Fengxia towards Zhenlong
Location

Xinnan station (Chinese: 新南站; pinyin: Xīnnán Zhàn; Jyutping: san^{1}naam^{4} zaam^{6}) is a station of Line 14 of the Guangzhou Metro. It started operations on 28 December 2017. The station connects to Jiufo station on the Suishen intercity railway.

== Station layout ==
G	-	Exits
L1; Concourse	Lobby	Customer Service, Vending machines, ATMs
L2; Platforms	Platform 2	14 towards Xinhe (Hongwei)
L2; Platforms	Island platform, doors will open on the left
L2; Platforms	Platform 1	14 towards Zhenlong (Fengxia)

== Exits ==
Exit number	Exit location
Exit B	Jiulong Dadao
Exit C	Jiulong Dadao
