= Tangcun station =

Guangzhou Metro station

Coordinates: 23°18′27″N 113°33′53″E

Tangcun 汤村
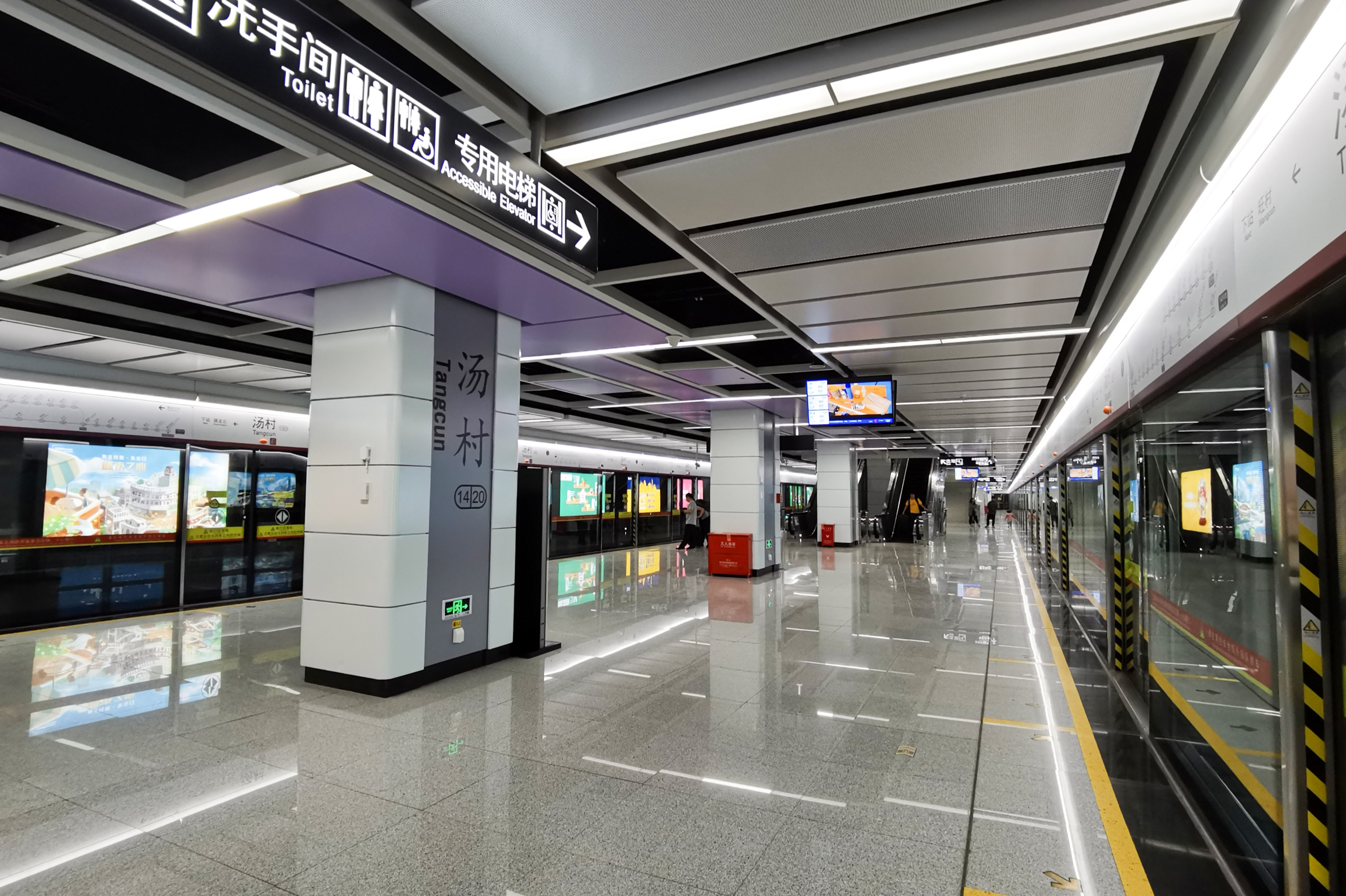
- Platform

Chinese name
- Simplified Chinese: 汤村站
- Traditional Chinese: 湯村站
Transcriptions
Standard Mandarin
- Hanyu Pinyin: Tāngcūn Zhàn
Yue: Cantonese
- Jyutping: tong^{1}cyun^{1} zaam^{6}

General information
- Location: Jiulong Avenue (九龙大道); Huangpu District, Guangzhou, Guangdong; China
- Operator: Guangzhou Metro Co. Ltd.
- Line: Line 14
- Platforms: 2 (1 island platform)
- Tracks: 2

Construction
- Structure type: Underground
- Accessible: Yes

Other information
- Station code: 1428

History
- Opened: 28 December 2017; 8 years ago

Services
Preceding station	Guangzhou Metro	Following station
Wangcun towards Xinhe	Line 14 Branch (Knowledge City Line)	Zhenlongbei towards Zhenlong
Location

Tangcun station (Chinese: 汤村站) is a station of Line 14 of the Guangzhou Metro. It started operations on 28 December 2017.

== Station Layout ==
The station has an underground island platform.

== Exits ==
There are 3 exits, lettered A, B and D. Exit A is accessible. All exits are located on Jiulong Avenue.
