= Fengxia station (Guangzhou Metro) =

Guangzhou Metro station

Coordinates: 23°21′47″N 113°30′30″E

Fengxia 枫下
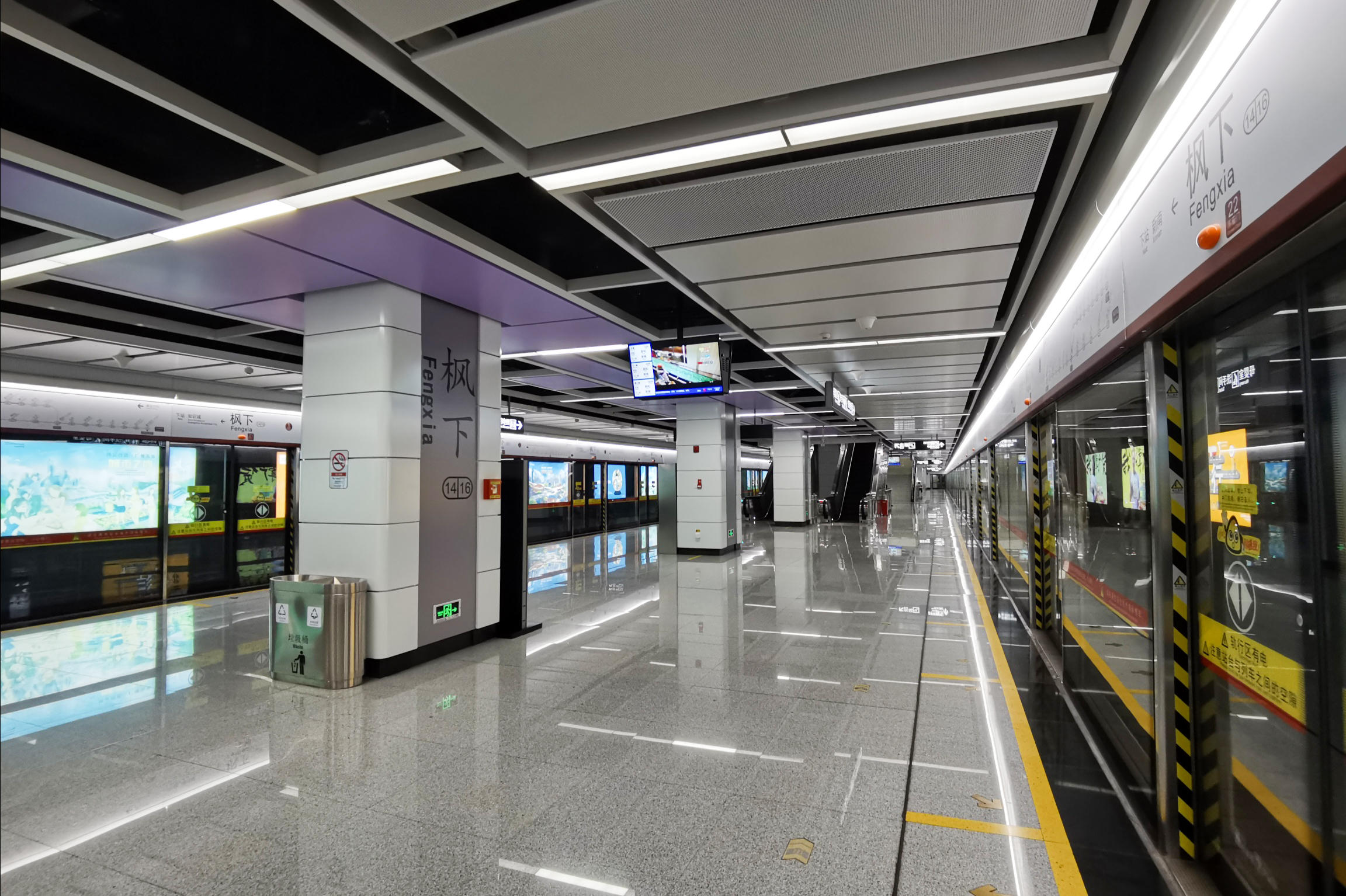
- Platform

Chinese name
- Simplified Chinese: 枫下站
- Traditional Chinese: 楓下站
Transcriptions
Standard Mandarin
- Hanyu Pinyin: Fēngxià Zhàn
Yue: Cantonese
- Jyutping: fung^{1}haa^{6} zaam^{6}

General information
- Location: Jiulong Avenue (九龙大道); Huangpu District, Guangzhou, Guangdong; China
- Operator: Guangzhou Metro Co. Ltd.
- Line: Line 14
- Platforms: 2 (1 island platform)
- Tracks: 2

Construction
- Structure type: Underground
- Accessible: Yes

Other information
- Station code: 1424

History
- Opened: 28 December 2017; 8 years ago

Services
Preceding station	Guangzhou Metro	Following station
Xinnan towards Xinhe	Line 14 Branch (Knowledge City Line)	Sino-Singapore Guangzhou Knowledge City towards Zhenlong
Location

Fengxia station (Chinese: 枫下站) is a station of Line 14 of the Guangzhou Metro. It started operations on 28 December 2017.

== Station Layout ==
The station has an underground island platform.

== Exits ==
There are 4 exits, lettered A, B, C (C1 and C2). Exit A is accessible. All exits are located on Jiulong Avenue.
