= Taihe station =

Metro station in Guangzhou, China

Taihe 太和
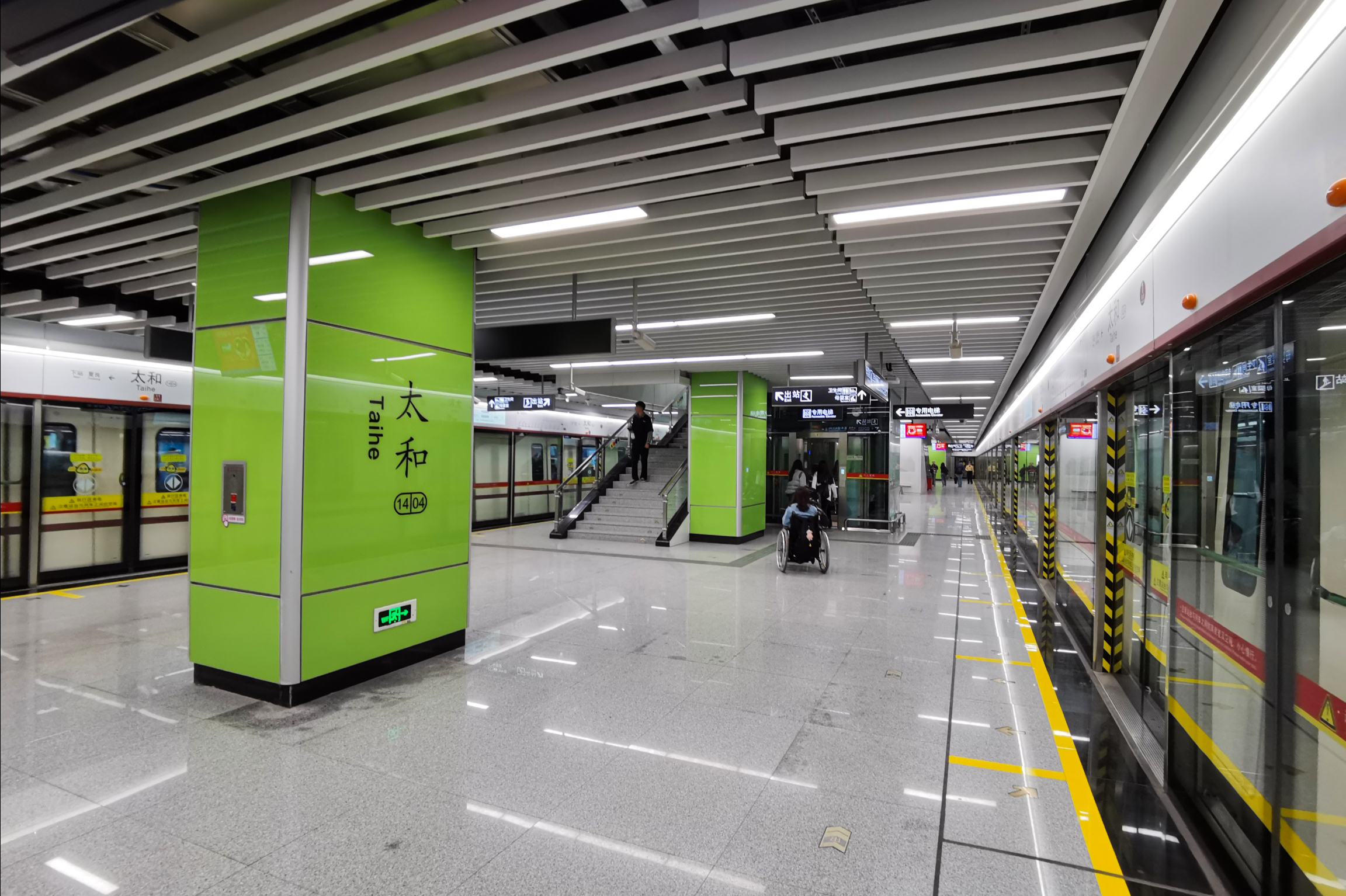
- Platform

Chinese name
- Simplified Chinese: 太和站
- Traditional Chinese: 太和站
Transcriptions

General information
- Location: Guangcong Highway (G105) × Dali Road; Baiyun District, Guangzhou, Guangdong; China
- Coordinates: 23°18′N 113°20′E
- Operated by: Guangzhou Metro Co. Ltd.
- Line: Line 14
- Platforms: 2 (1 island platform)
- Tracks: 4

Construction
- Structure type: Underground
- Accessible: Yes

Other information
- Station code: 1412

History
- Opened: 28 December 2018; 7 years ago

Services
Preceding station	Guangzhou Metro	Following station
Xialiang towards Lejia Road	Line 14	Zhuliao towards Dongfeng
Location

Taihe station (Chinese: 太和站) is a station of Line 14 of the Guangzhou Metro. It started operations on 28 December 2018.

The station has an underground island platform. Platform 1 is for trains heading to Dongfeng, whilst platform 2 is for trains heading to Lejia Road, along with 2 bypass tracks next to the stopping tracks.

== Exits ==
There are 4 exits, lettered A, C, D and E. Exit E is accessible. All exits are located on Guangcong No. 3 Road.

== Gallery ==
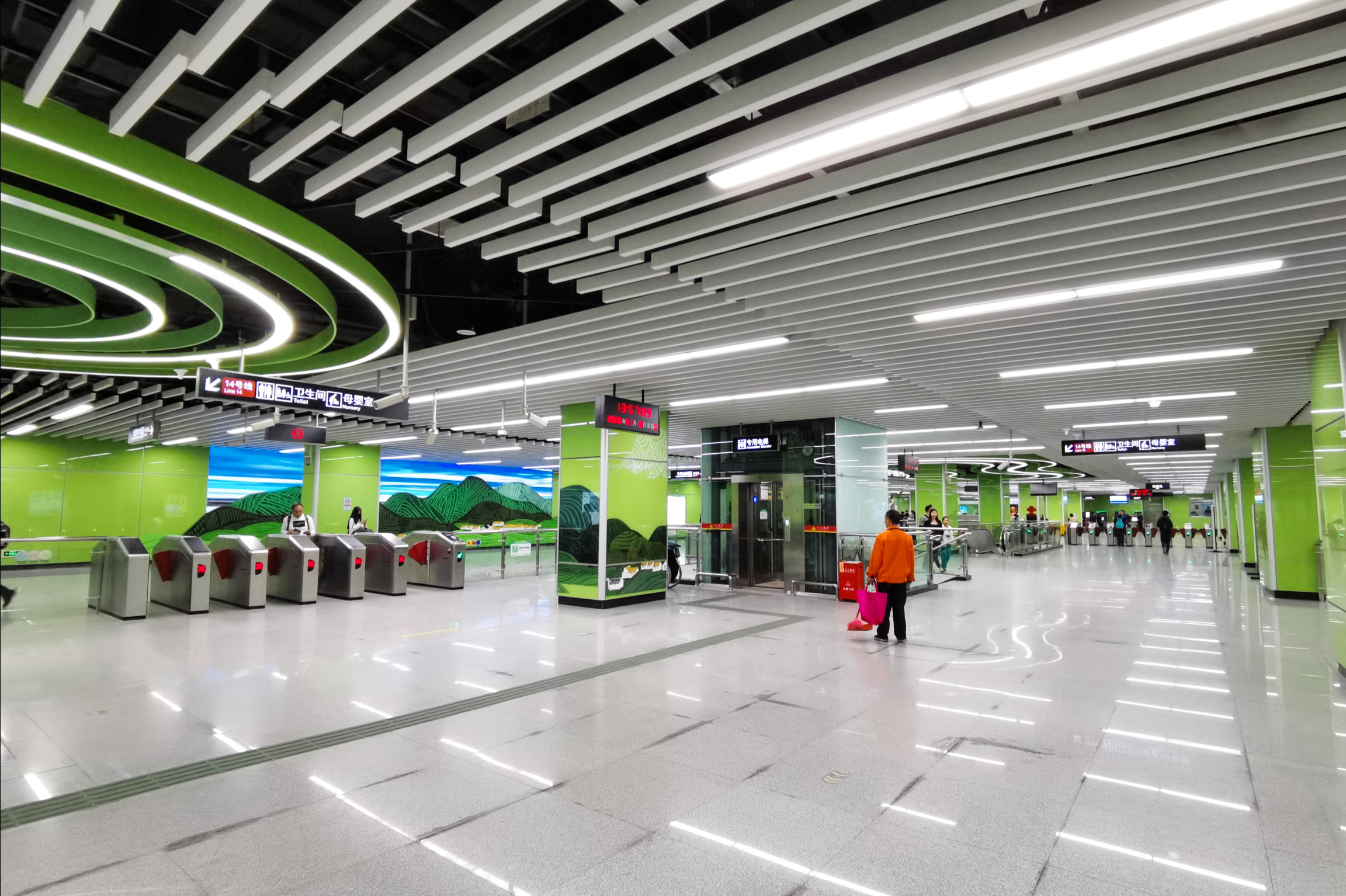
Concourse

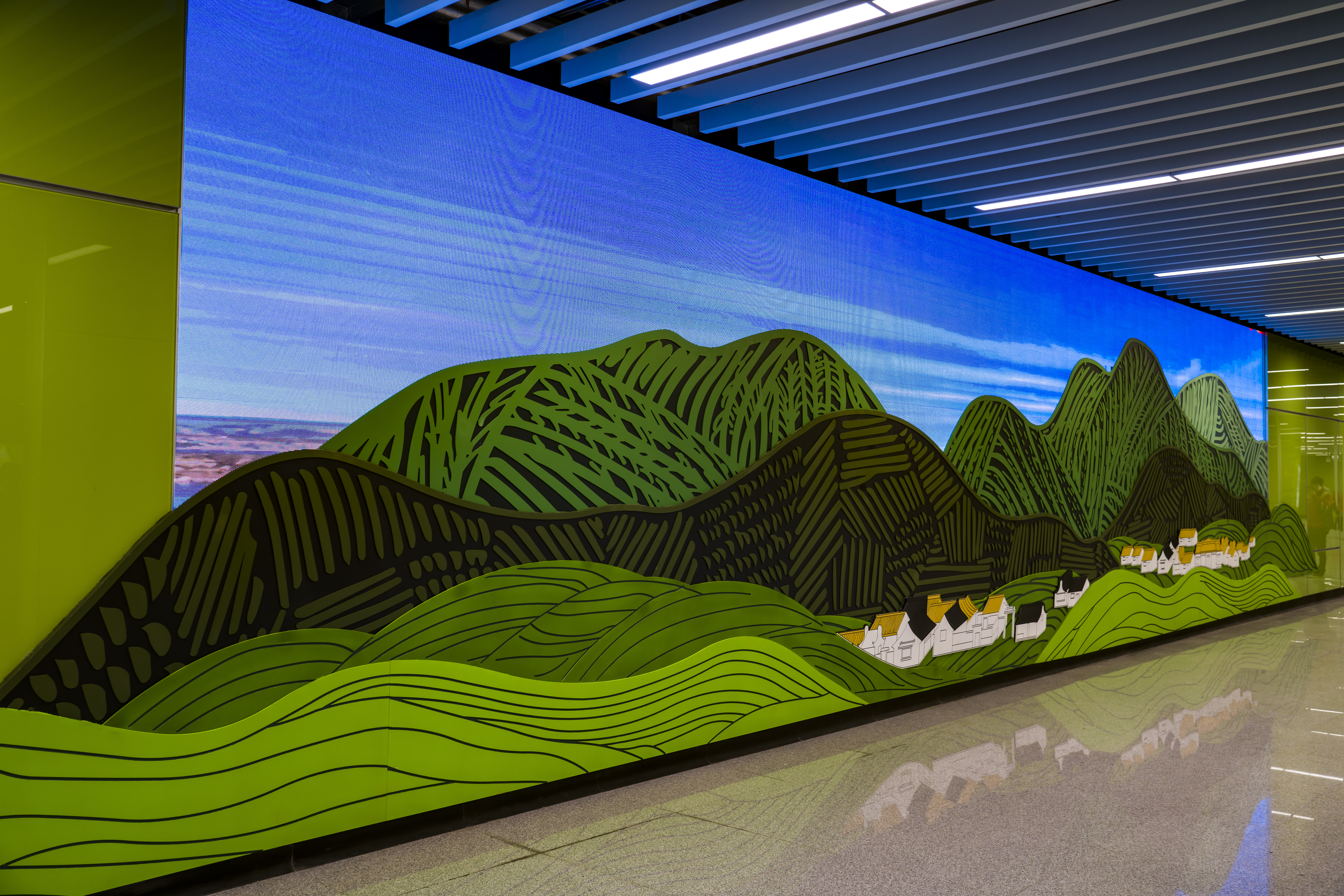
Concourse culture wall artwork

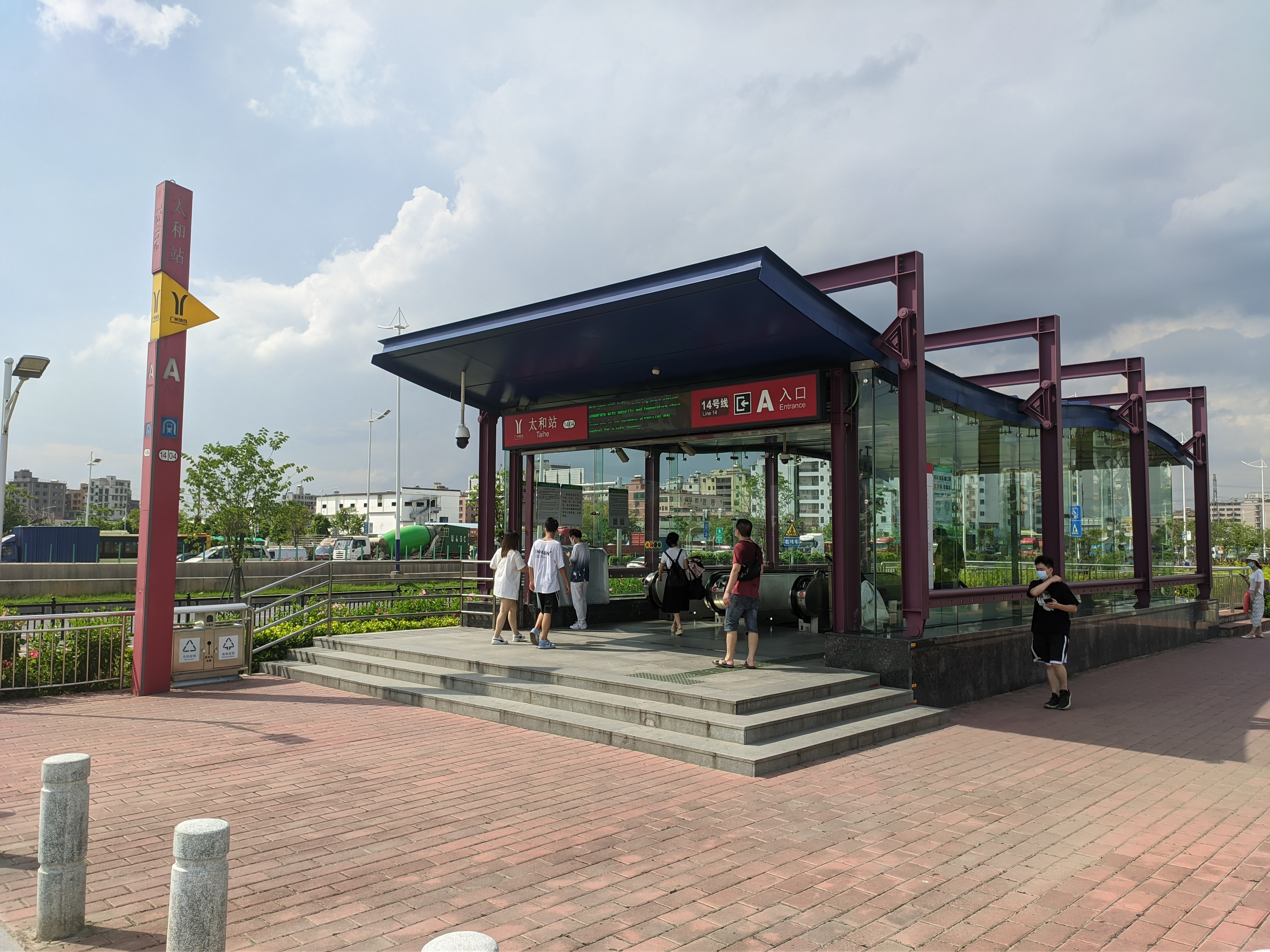
Exit A

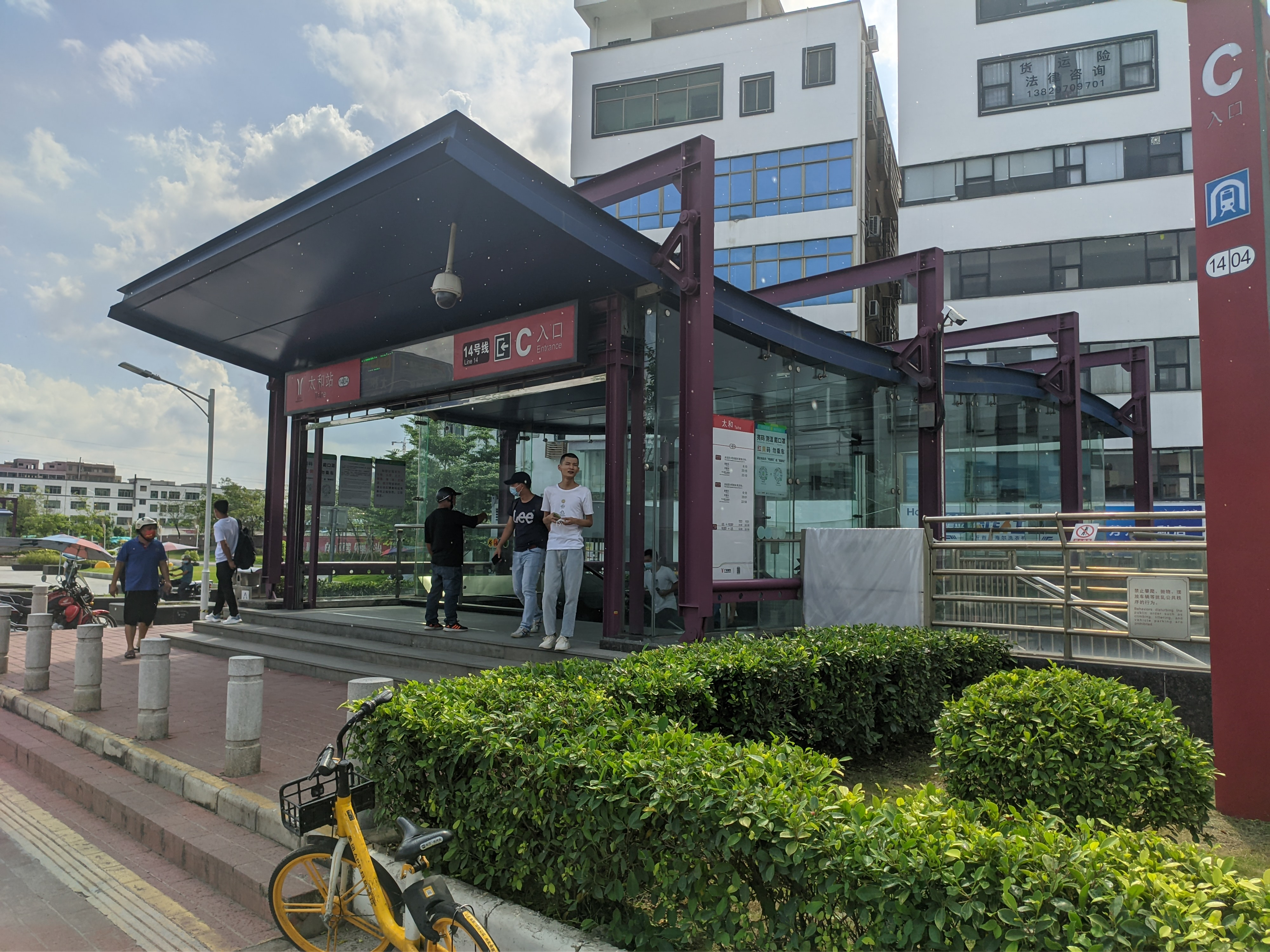
Exit C

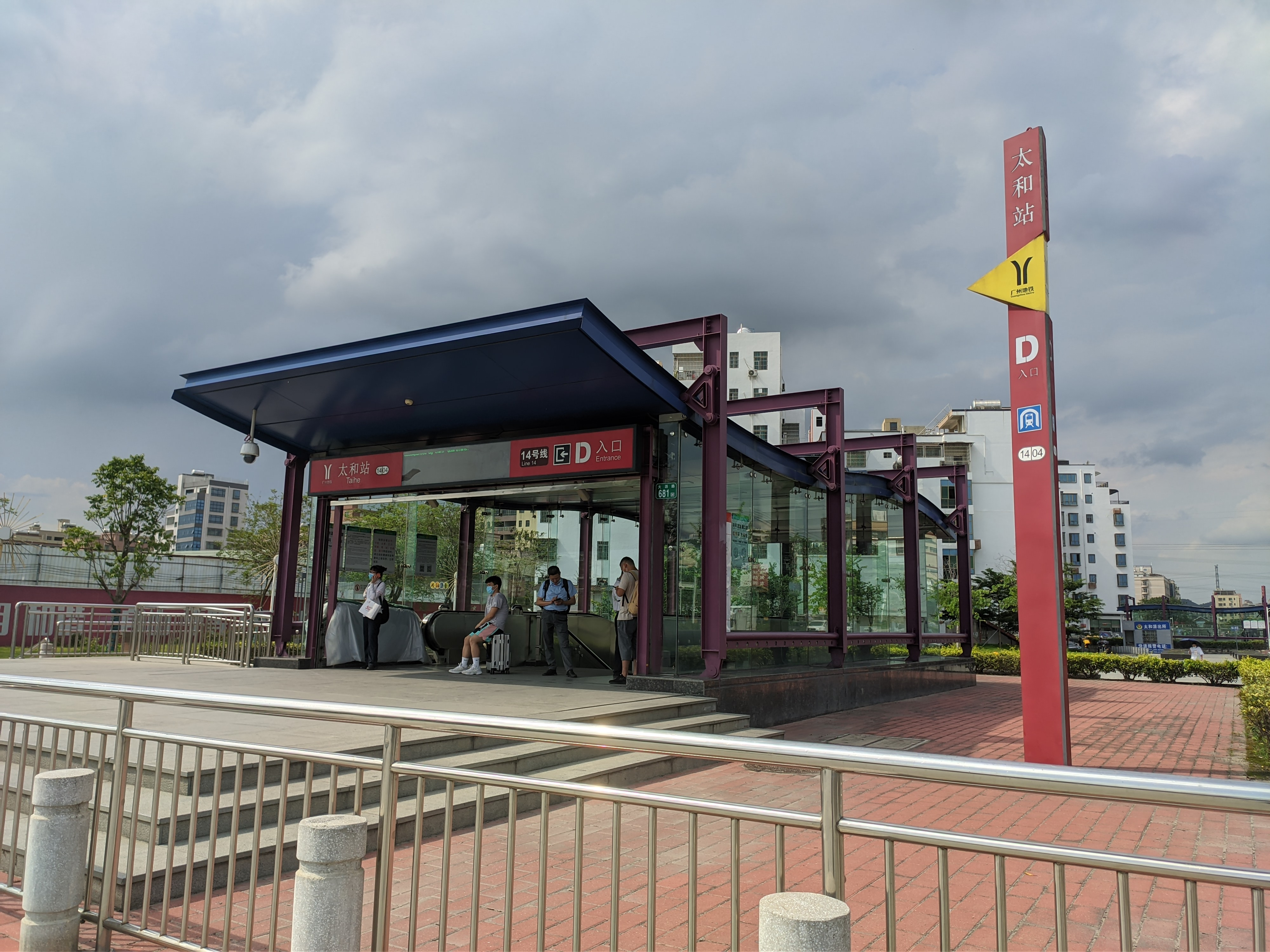
Exit D

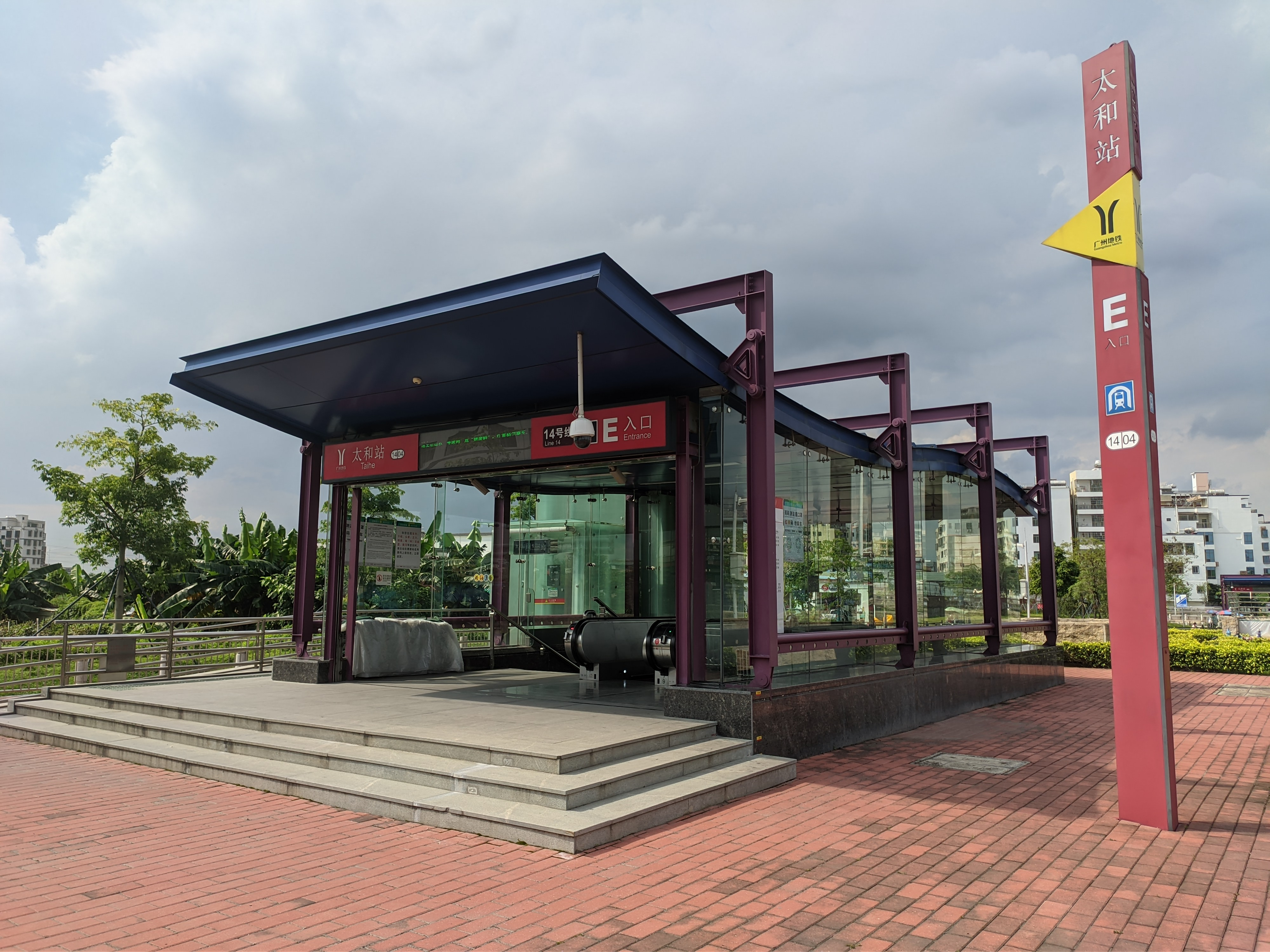
Exit E
