= Xialiang station =

Metro station in Guangzhou, China

Xialiang 夏良
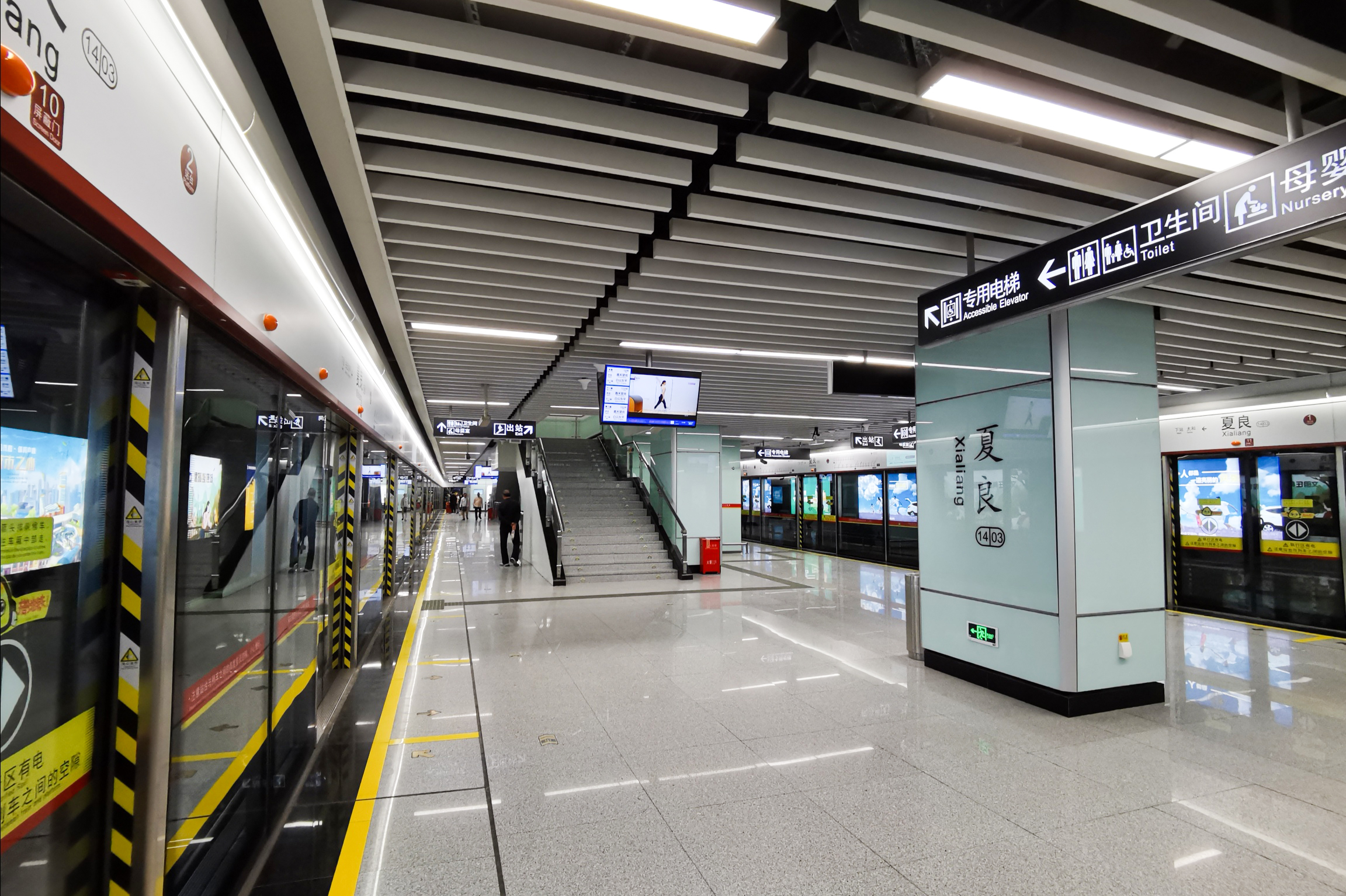
- Platform

Chinese name
- Simplified Chinese: 夏良站
- Traditional Chinese: 夏良站
Transcriptions

General information
- Location: Baiyun District, Guangzhou, Guangdong; China
- Coordinates: 23.28°N 113.32°E
- Operated by: Guangzhou Metro Co. Ltd.
- Line: Line 14
- Platforms: 2 (1 island platform)
- Tracks: 2

Construction
- Structure type: Underground
- Accessible: Yes

Other information
- Station code: 1411

History
- Opened: 28 December 2018; 7 years ago

Services
| Preceding station | Guangzhou Metro | Following station |
|---|---|---|
| Baiyun Dongping towards Lejia Road | Line 14 | Taihe towards Dongfeng |
Location

Xialiang station (Chinese: 夏良站) is a station of Line 14 of the Guangzhou Metro. It started operations on 28 December 2018.

The station has an underground island platform. Platform 1 is for trains heading to Dongfeng, whilst platform 2 is for trains heading to Lejia Road.

== Exits ==
There are 3 exits, lettered B, C and D. Exit C is accessible. All exits are located on Longhe West Road.

== Gallery ==
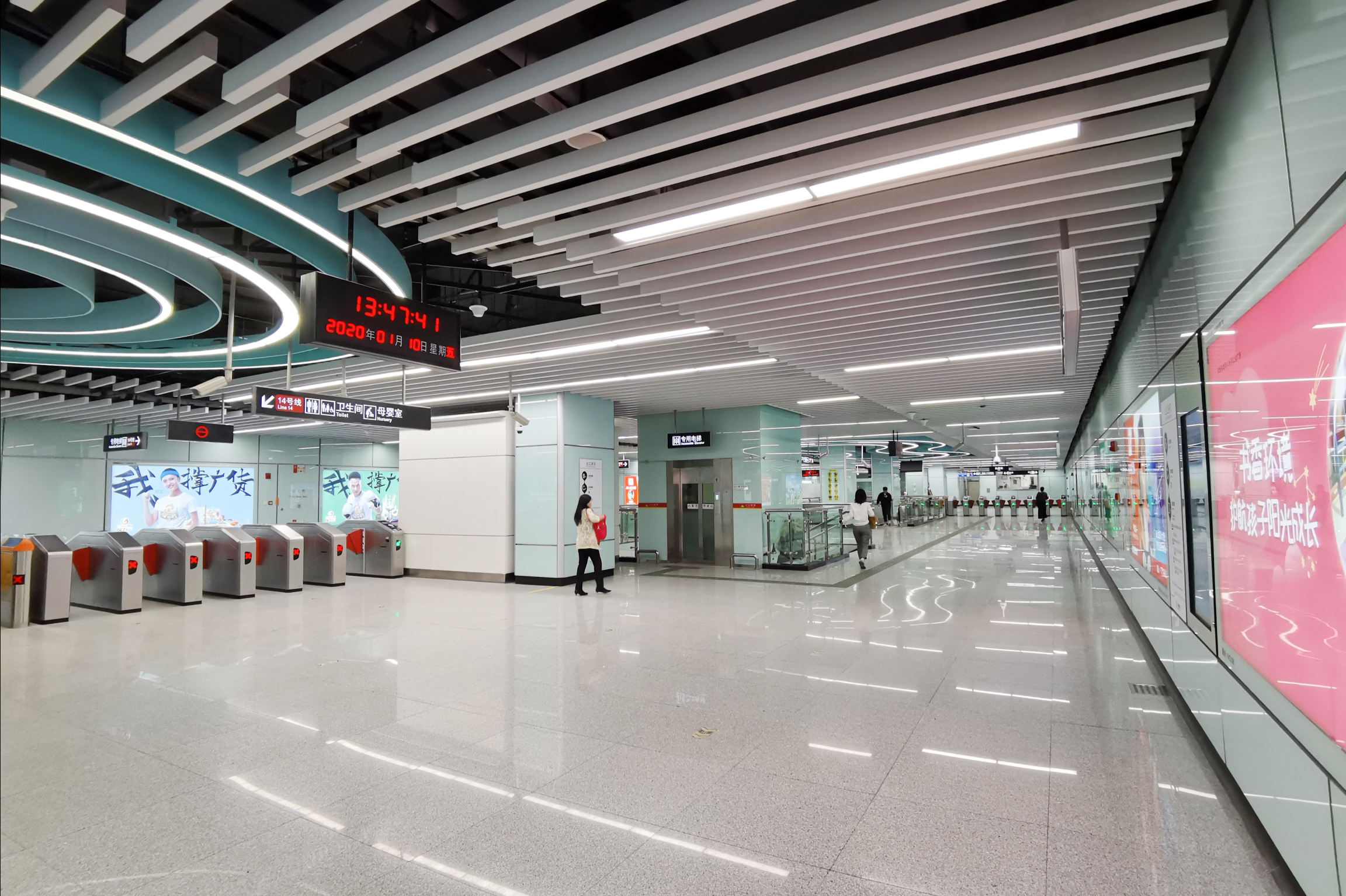
Concourse

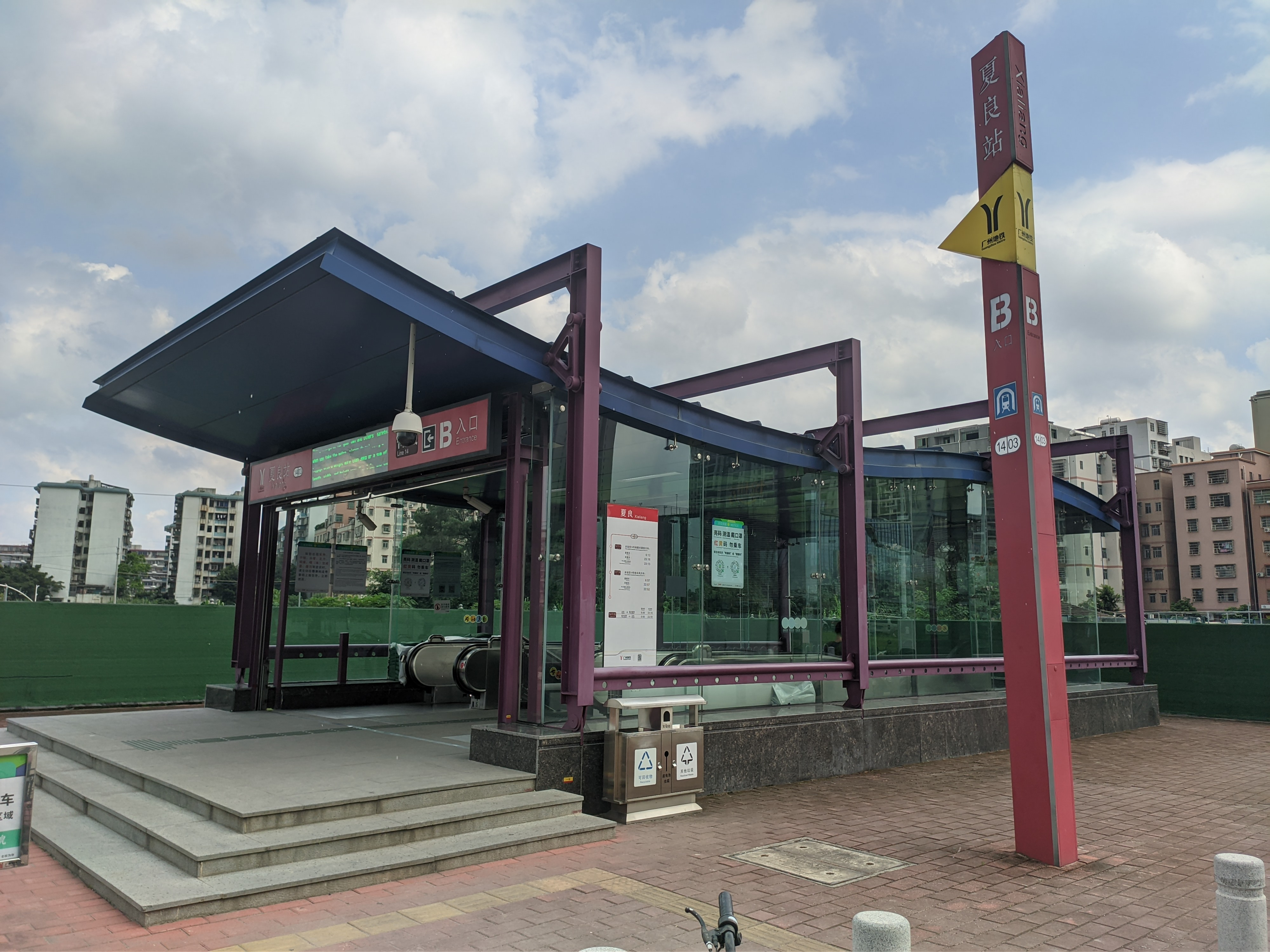
Exit B

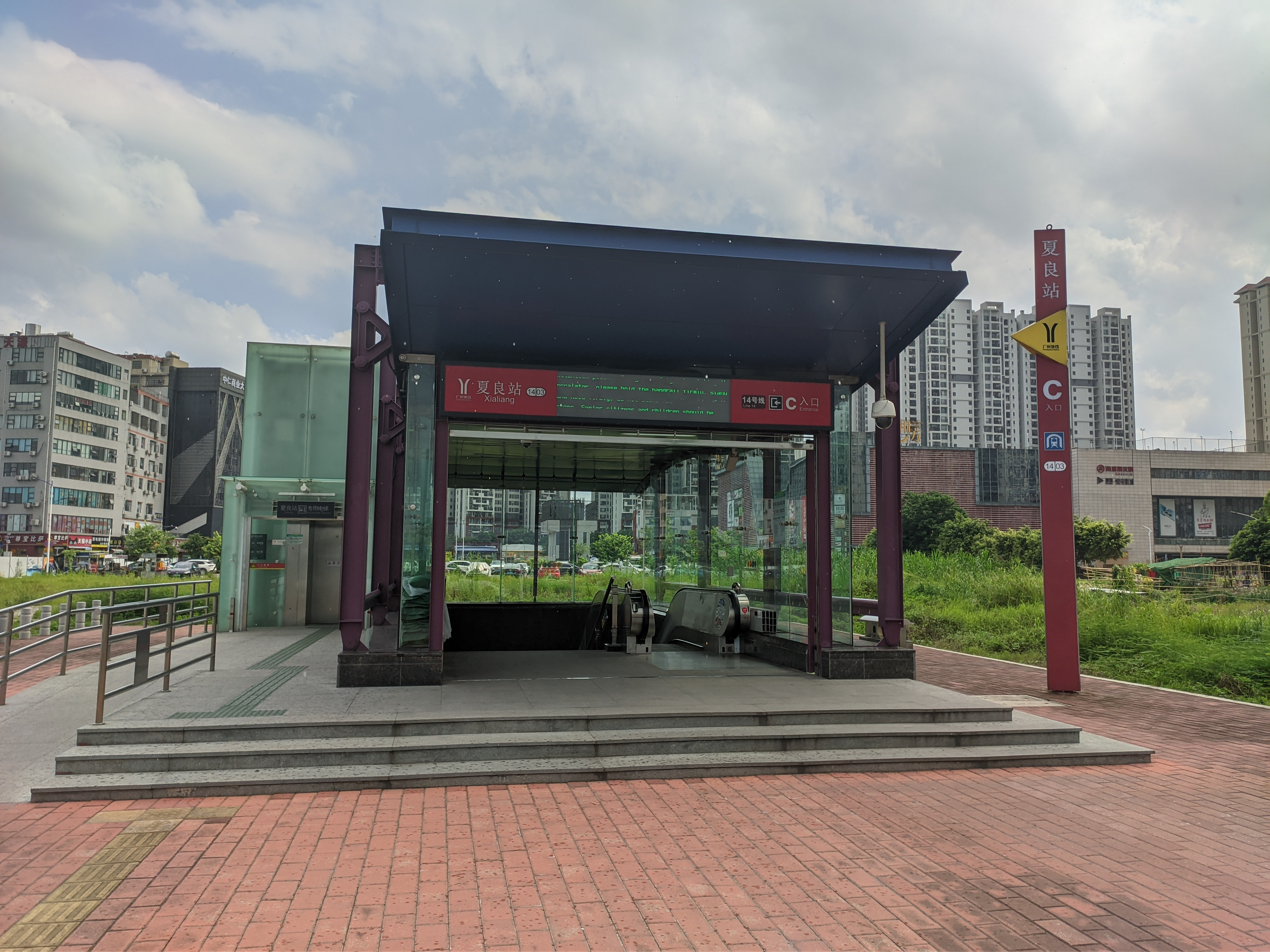
Exit C

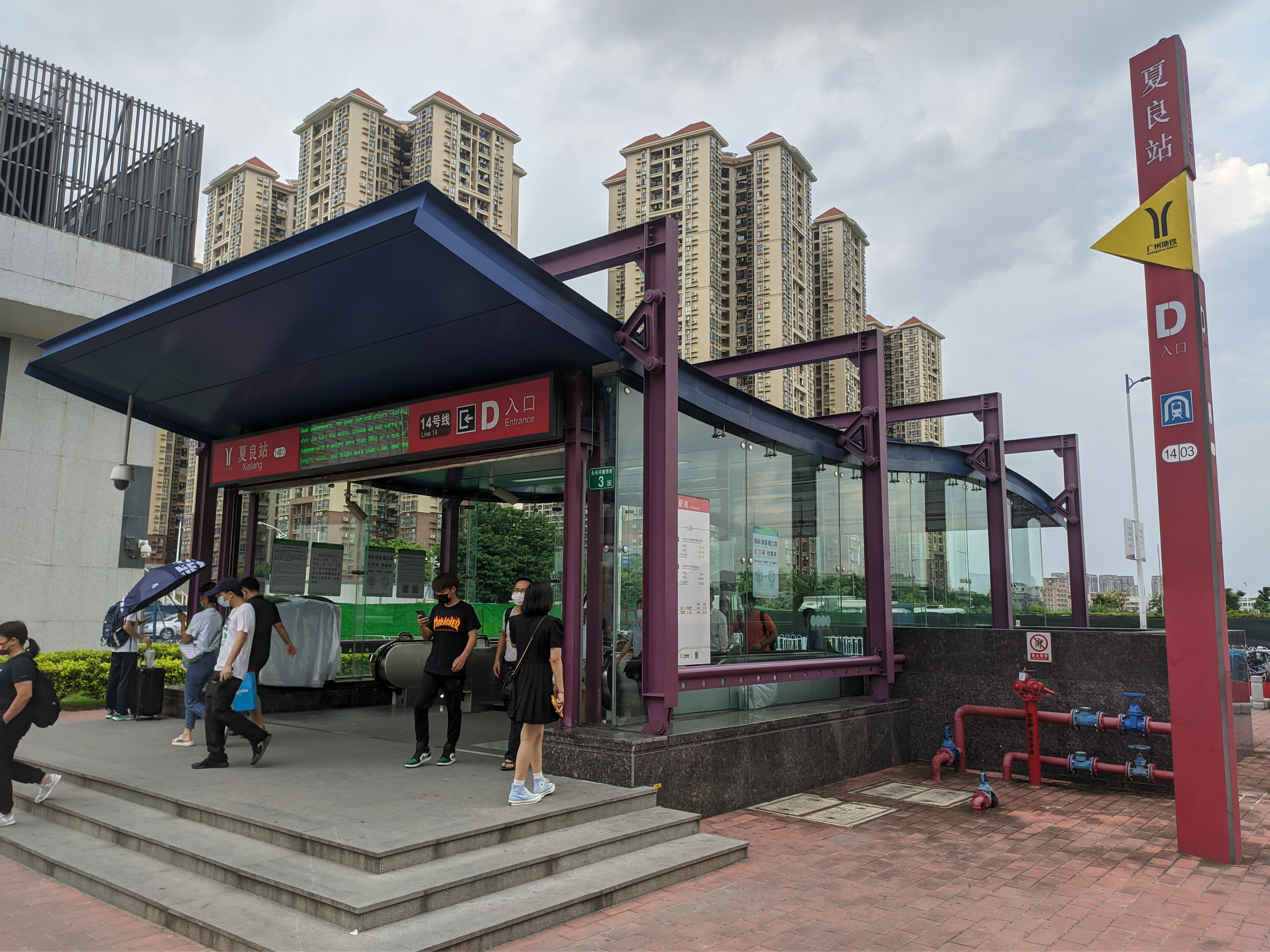
Exit D
